= Virginia State Route 83 =

State highway in western Virginia, US

State Route 83

Route information
- Maintained by VDOT
- Length: 61.71 mi (99.31 km)
- Existed: 1940–present
- Tourist routes: Virginia Byway

Major junctions
- West end: US 23 Bus. in Pound
- SR 72 in Clintwood; SR 63 in Clinchco; SR 80 in Haysi; US 460 in Grundy
- East end: WV 83 in Paynesville

Location
- Country: United States
- State: Virginia
- Counties: Wise, Dickenson, Buchanan

Highway system
- Virginia Routes; Interstate; US; Primary; Secondary; Byways; History; HOT lanes
← SR 82	→ SR 84

State Route 83 (SR 83) is a primary state highway in the U.S. state of Virginia. The state highway runs 61.71 miles (99.31 km) from U.S. Route 23 Business (US 23 Business) in Pound east to the West Virginia state line in Paynesville, where the highway continues as West Virginia Route 83 (WV 83). SR 83 is the main highway of Dickenson County, where it connects the county's three towns of Clintwood, Clinchco, and Haysi. The state highway connects those towns with Pound in Wise County and Grundy in Buchanan County, and connects Grundy with McDowell County, West Virginia.

== Route description ==
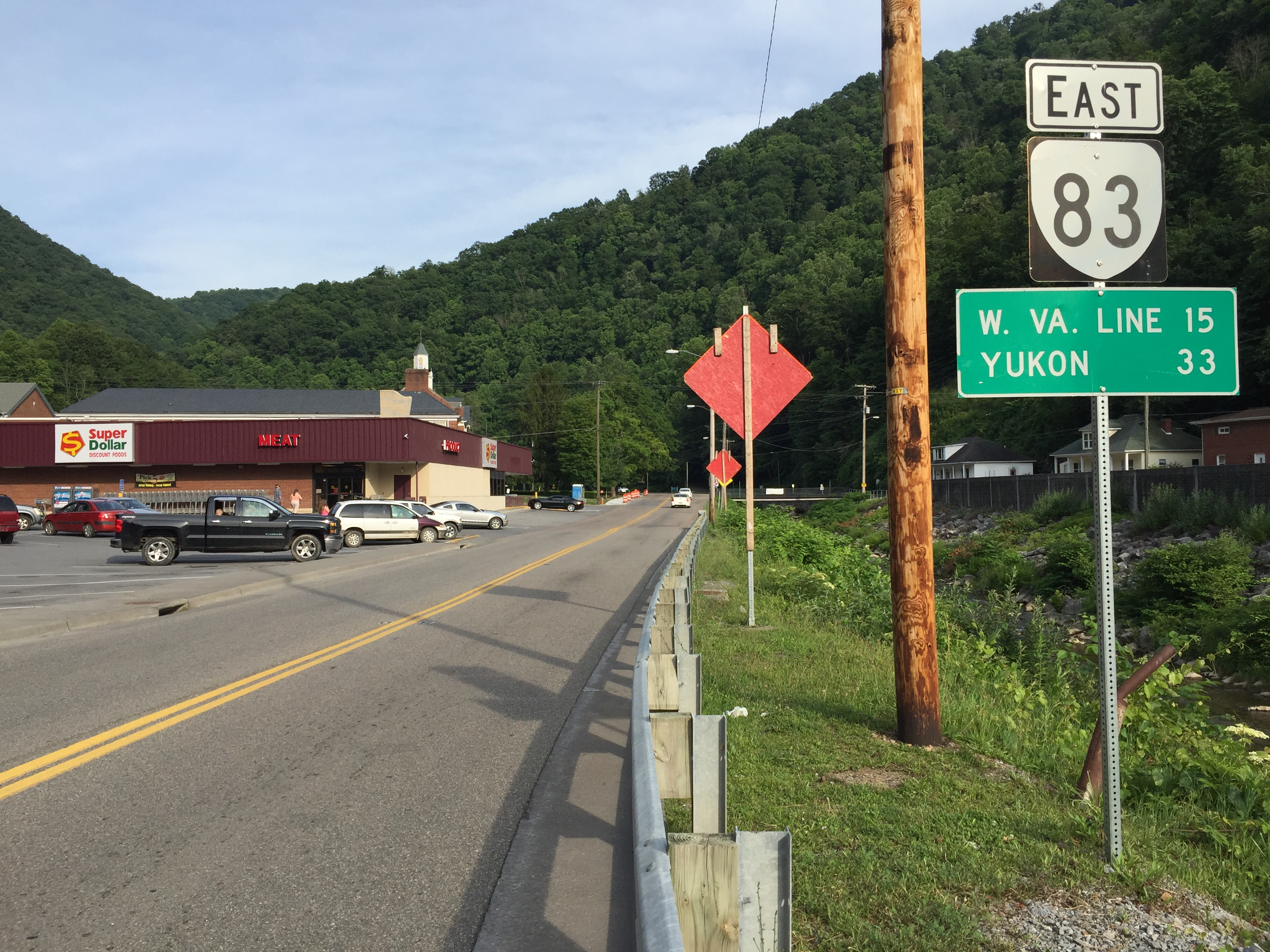
View east along SR 83 east of US 460 in Grundy

SR 83 begins at an intersection with US 23 Business (Main Street) in the town of Pound. The state highway heads northeast as Clintwood Highway, a two-lane undivided road that crosses the Pound River and exits the town. SR 83 passes through the hamlet of Meade before reaching the Wise–Dickenson county line at Georges Fork Gap, just east of which the highway intersects SR 361, the access road to Red Onion State Prison. The state highway continues as Dickenson Highway through an intersection with SR 72 (Coeburn Road) to Clintwood, the county seat of Dickenson County. SR 83 enters the town on Main Street, turns onto Mullins Avenue, then continues on Fremont Avenue, which has a sharp curve as it ascends Baker Ridge and leaves the town. The state highway re-assumes the name Dickenson Highway and descends to and crosses the Cranes Nest River. SR 83 summits Hill Ridge at Bearpen Gap before descending to the hamlet of Fremont, where the highway crosses over CSX's Kingsport Subdivision and the McClure River and intersects SR 63 (Dante Mountain Road).

SR 83 runs concurrently with SR 63 and parallels the river and railroad to the town of Clinchco. At the north end of the town, the two state highways diverge for separate routes to Haysi. SR 63 ascends onto and follows Big Ridge to the town while SR 83 follows the Kingsport Subdivision and the McClure River to the town. On arriving in the town of Haysi, SR 83 veers east away from the river and railroad and crosses Russell Fork to intersect SR 80 (Helen Henderson Highway). The two highways head north into the center of town on Sandlick Drive, which crosses Russell Prater Creek at its confluence with Russell Fork and meets the northern end of SR 63 (Main Street). SR 83 and SR 80 turn east onto Main Street and follow Russell Prater Creek to the north end of town, where SR 80 heads north as Breaks Park Road. SR 83 continues east as Dickenson Highway along the creek into Buchanan County.

SR 83 follows Russell Prater Creek to the hamlet of Prater, then follows War Fork to its source at Lovers Gap. The state highway follows Big Lick Branch and Big Prater Creek and passes to the south of Grundy Municipal Airport on its way to Vansant. There, SR 83 crosses Levisa Fork and joins US 460 on a four-lane undivided highway through Tookland and Royal City to the town of Grundy, which the two highways enter on Riverside Drive. In the center of the Buchanan County seat, SR 83 turns east onto two-lane undivided Edgewater Drive and passes by the Buchanan County Courthouse and the Appalachian School of Law. The state highway exits Grundy on Slate Creek Road, which follows Slate Creek through the hamlet of Stacy. Near the source of Slate Creek, SR 83 veers north and ascends to the top of State Line Ridge, where the highway reaches its eastern terminus at the West Virginia state line in Paynesville. The road continues as WV 83, which parallels the state line through the West Virginia section of Paynesville before descending from the ridge to Bradshaw.

== Major intersections ==
County	Location	mi	km	Destinations	Notes
Wise	Pound	0.00	0.00	US 23 Bus. (Main Street) – Norton, Jenkins, North Fork of Pound Lake	Western terminus
Dickenson	Georges Fork Gap	3.57	5.75	SR 361 south – Red Onion State Prison	
Dickenson	Georges Fork	7.48	12.04	SR 72 south (Coeburn Road) – Coeburn	Northern terminus of SR 72
Dickenson	Fremont	15.52	24.98	SR 63 south (Dante Mountain Road) – McClure, St. Paul	West end of concurrency with SR 63
Dickenson	Clinchco	20.46	32.93	SR 63 north (Big Ridge Road) – John W. Flannagan Dam & Reservoir	East end of concurrency with SR 63
Dickenson	Haysi	26.69	42.95	SR 80 east (Sandlick Drive) – Honaker	West end of concurrency with SR 80
Dickenson	Haysi	27.03	43.50	SR 63 south (Haysi Main Street) – John Flannagan Dam	Northern terminus of SR 63
Dickenson	Haysi	28.12	45.25	SR 80 west (Breaks Park Road) – Breaks Interstate Park, Elkhorn City	East end of concurrency with SR 80
Buchanan	Vansant	41.96	67.53	US 460 east (Riverside Drive) – Richlands	West end of concurrency with US 460
Buchanan	Grundy	45.91	73.88	US 460 west (Riverside Drive) – Pikeville	East end of concurrency with US 460
Buchanan	Paynesville	61.71	99.31	WV 83 east – Yukon	West Virginia state line; eastern terminus
1.000 mi = 1.609 km; 1.000 km = 0.621 mi

< SR 120	District 1 State Routes; 1928–1933	SR 122 >
