= List of lakes of Virginia =

This is a list of lakes in the Commonwealth of Virginia in the United States. Virginia has two natural lakes, and several man-made lakes and reservoirs. Swimming, fishing, and/or boating are permitted in some of these lakes, but not all.

== Natural lakes ==
- Lake Drummond
- Mountain Lake

== Other lakes and reservoirs ==
- Abel Reservoir
- Lake Accotink
- Amelia Lake
- Lake Anna
- Lake Anne
- Lake Audubon (Virginia)
- Lake Barcroft
- Bear Creek Lake (Virginia)
- Beaver Creek Reservoir
- Beaverdam Creek Reservoir
- Beaverdam Swamp Reservoir
- Briery Creek Lake
- Buggs Island Lake (Kerr Lake (officially John H. Kerr Reservoir))
- Burke Lake
- Burnt Mills Reservoir
- Lake Chesdin
- Claytor Lake
- Lake Conner
- Curtis Lake
- Diascund Reservoir
- Emporia Reservoir
- Lake Fairfax
- Fairy Stone Lake
- Flannagan Reservoir
- Lake Frederick
- Lake Gaston (Also extends into North Carolina).
- Gatewood Reservoir
- Germantown Lake
- Lake Gordon (Virginia)
- Great Creek Watershed Lake
- Harwoods Mill Reservoir
- Holiday Lake
- Hungry Mother Lake
- Lake Kilby
- Loch Lothian
- Keokee Lake
- Laurel Bed Lake
- Lee Hall Reservoir (Newport News City Reservoir)
- Leesville Reservoir
- Lake Manassas
- The Mariners' Lake
- Martinsville Reservoir
- Lake Meade (Virginia)
- Lake Mercer
- Mill Creek Lake
- Lake Monocan
- Lake Moomaw
- Motts Run Reservoir
- Lake Nelson
- Lake Newport
- Ni Reservoir
- North Fork Pound Reservoir (Pound Lake)
- Nottoway Lake
- Occoquan Reservoir
- Lake Orange
- Pelham Reservoir
- Philpott Reservoir
- Lake Prince
- Rivanna Reservoir
- Sandy Bottom Park Pond
- Sandy River Reservoir
- Skidmore Reservoir
- Lake Smith
- Smith Mountain Lake
- South Holston Lake
- The South Lakes
- Swift Creek Lake
- Waller Mill Reservoir
- Western Branch Reservoir
- Lake Whitehurst
- Lake Jackson
- Lake of the Woods, Virginia
- Woodglen Lake
- Lake Thoreau
