= West Virginia Route 635 =

State highway in West Virginia, United States

West Virginia Route 635

Route information
- Maintained by WVDOH
- Length: 3.71 mi (5.97 km)

Major junctions
- South end: SR 616 / SR 635 at Wimmer Gap
- North end: WV 83 in Jolo

Location
- Country: United States
- State: West Virginia
- Counties: McDowell

Highway system
- West Virginia State Highway System; Interstate; US; State
← WV 622	→ WV 705

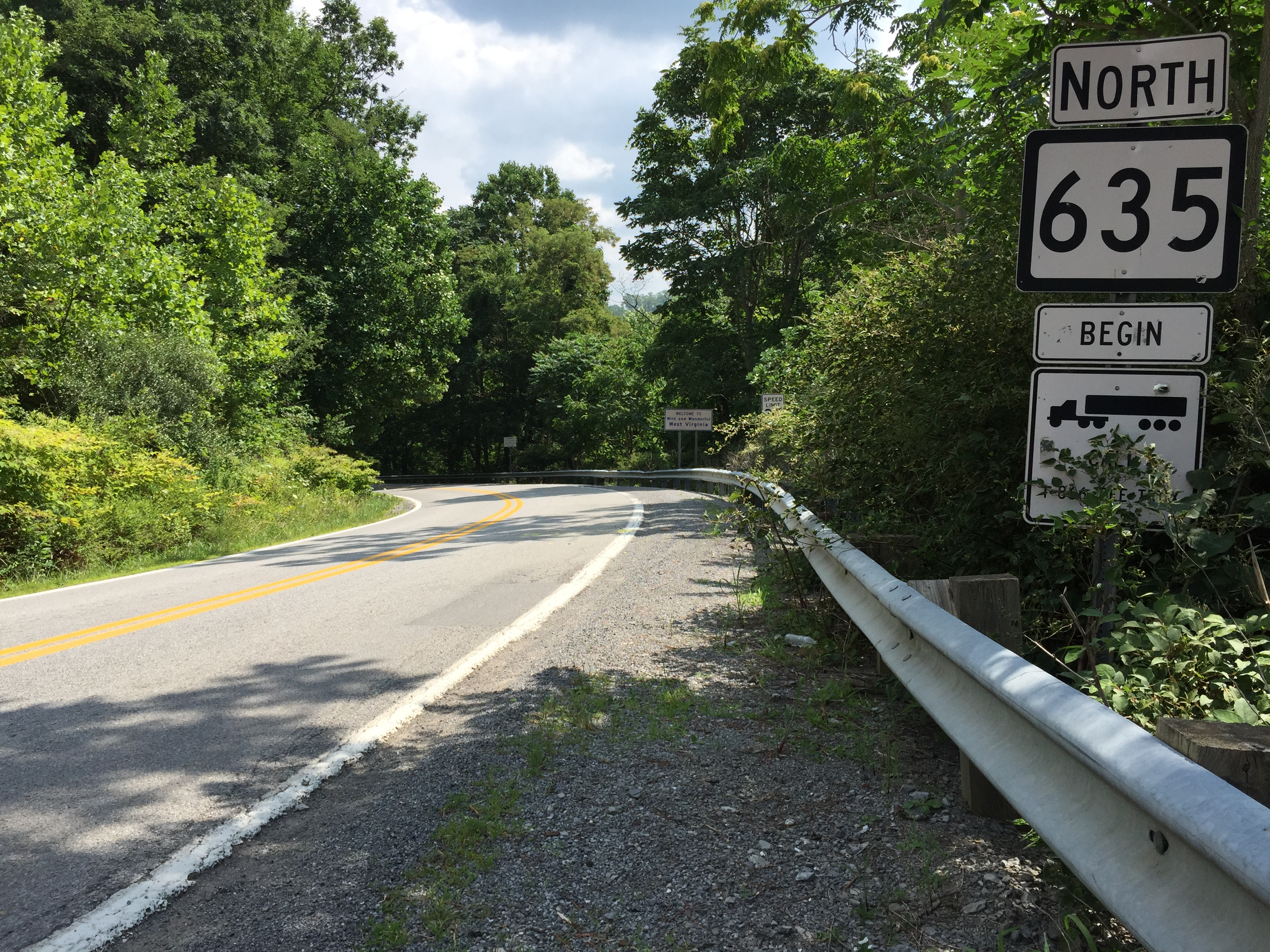
View north at the south end of WV 635 at SR 616 and SR 635 at the Virginia state line at Wimmer Gap

West Virginia Route 635 is a north–south state highway located in McDowell County, West Virginia. The southern terminus is at the Virginia state line south of Jolo, where the road continues south as State Route 635, a secondary state highway. The northern terminus of the route is at West Virginia Route 83 in Jolo.

== Major intersections ==
The entire route is in McDowell County.

Location	mi	km	Destinations	Notes
Wimmer Gap	0.00	0.00	SR 616 / SR 635 (Wimmer Gap Road)	Virginia state line (State Line Ridge)
Jolo	3.71	5.97	WV 83	
1.000 mi = 1.609 km; 1.000 km = 0.621 mi
