= John Pelham (soldier) =

American Confederate cavalry officer of the American Civil War (1838–1863)

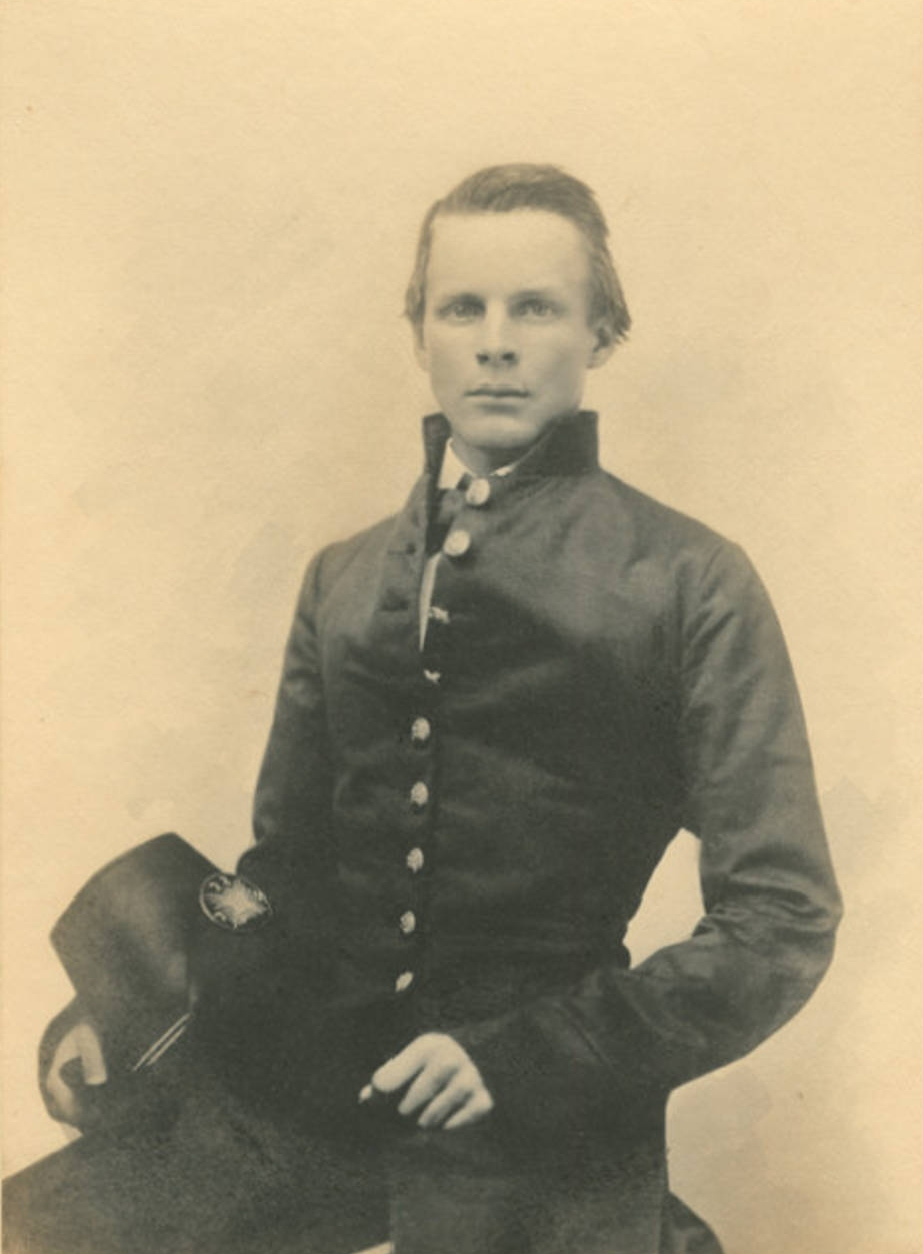
- John Pelham in his West Point uniform in 1858
- Born: September 7, 1838; Near Alexandria, Alabama
- Died: March 17, 1863 (aged 24); Culpeper, Virginia
- Burial place: City Cemetery in Jacksonville, Alabama
- Military career
- Allegiance: Confederate States of America
- Branch: Confederate States Army
- Service years: 1861–1863
- Rank: Major (posthumously promoted to lieutenant colonel)
- Conflicts: American Civil War: First Battle of Bull Run; Battle of Antietam; Battle of Fredericksburg; Battle of Kelly's Ford †

John Pelham (September 7, 1838 – March 17, 1863) was a Confederate cavalry soldier under J. E. B. Stuart during the American Civil War. Robert E. Lee called Pelham "The Gallant Pelham" for his use of light artillery at the Battle of Fredericksburg to delay U.S. soldiers.

== Early life ==
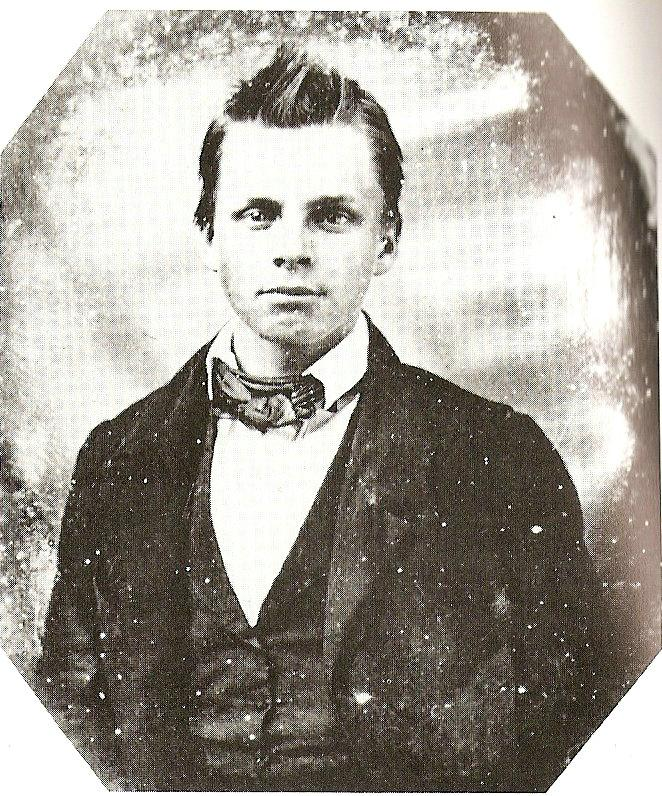
Pelham at the age of sixteen.

Pelham was the third of seven children, with five brothers and a sister Betty, born to Dr. Atkinson and Martha Pelham (née McGehee) at his grandparents' home along Cane Creek near Alexandria, Alabama. He grew up on the family's 1,000-acre (400 ha) plantation and learned to raise horses at a young age.

In 1856, Sampson Willis Harris secured an appointment for Pelham to the United States Military Academy at the request of A. J. Walker.

== Civil War ==
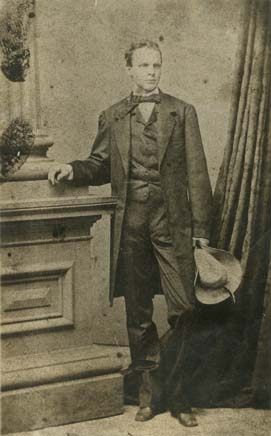
Pelham in 1860.

In 1860, rumblings of Southern secession were affecting Pelham, and he expressed concerns that he would not be able to graduate in letters he wrote home.

In 1861, with graduation approaching and war breaking out, Pelham wrote to Jefferson Davis inquiring whether he should leave West Point. Ultimately, Pelham resigned from West Point just a few weeks before his planned graduation to accept a commission in the militia of his home state of Alabama. He soon went to Virginia, where he joined the army of Joseph E. Johnston as a lieutenant in the artillery. Pelham's well-drilled and disciplined battery caught the eye of J.E.B. Stuart, who provided horses for the men and transformed the battery into "horse artillery", more mobile than conventional artillery.

Pelham was involved in every significant military engagement of Stuart's cavalry from the First Battle of Bull Run to Kelly's Ford, more than 60 encounters. He is noted as the Chief of Stuart's Artillery in the Battle of Antietam (Sharpsburg) and Battle of Fredericksburg. At Sharpsburg, Pelham's guns, positioned on a rise known as Nicodemus Hill, repeatedly harassed the flanks of oncoming Union lines, causing numerous casualties and breaking up battle formations.

At Fredericksburg, Pelham's guns, positioned well in advance of the main Confederate lines, held up the entire flank of the Union Army of the Potomac for several hours, enabling the Confederates to repel a series of strong attacks. General Robert E. Lee commended Pelham in his official report for "unflinching courage" while under direct fire from multiple Union batteries. Pelham was, at the time, commanding only two guns that were in service, but with those batteries for a time was able to enfilade the entire advancing Federal lines of battle.

At the Battle of Kelly's Ford on March 17, 1863, Pelham participated in a cavalry charge, his artillery not being engaged. Not long afterward, an exploding U.S. artillery shell fragment struck him in the head. He was carried six miles (10 km) from the battlefield to Culpeper Courthouse and died the following morning without having regained consciousness.

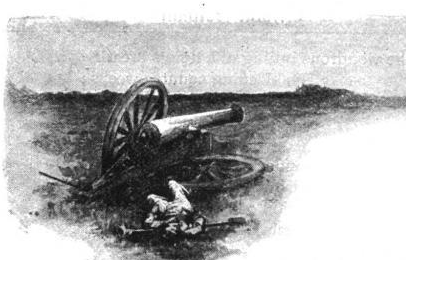
An 1889 illustration of Pelham's death at Kelly's Ford.

== Legacy ==
The Confederate Senate approved Lee's recommendation that Pelham receive a posthumous promotion to lieutenant colonel. Pelham's body was returned home and buried at City Cemetery in Jacksonville, Alabama, where a statue erected downtown in 1909 commemorates the fallen Confederate officer. A stone obelisk monument honoring Pelham, which contained an inscription on the base referring to him as "gallant" and beloved and which had stood in the grassy median of a busy avenue in Anniston, Alabama since 1905, was removed late at night on September 27, 2020. However, there were still plans to relocate it to a Confederate history park.

In 1894, poet James R. Randall wrote the poem John Pelham.

In 1901, a portrait of Pelham was hung with other Confederate officers in Alexandria, Virginia, and General Joseph Wheeler gave the speech on the ascension of his portrait, referring to him as the "Gallant Pelham".

In 1907, one of his spurs was among the artifacts melted down to create the Pokahuntas Bell for the Jamestown Exposition.

The John Pelham Historical Association preserves an archive of his papers and memorabilia. In 1955, the Alabama Hall of Fame honored Pelham, inducting him into the honorific organization. The cities of Pelham, Alabama and Pelham, North Carolina, and Pelham, Georgia are named in his honor. In 2004, against protests by some citizens, the state of Georgia designated the section of State Highway 300 that passes through Pelham as the John Pelham Memorial Parkway.

The United States Field Artillery named artillery camps for him, such as the former Camp Pelham, which housed artillery battalions of first the 1st Cavalry Division and then later the 2nd Infantry Division in Korea.

In the 1970s, The County of Culpeper, Virginia, built Lake Pelham to memorialize Pelham. In October 2022, the lake was renamed Lake Culpeper.

During and after the war, Pelham's 1858 photograph, taken in the Mathew Brady studio, was well known by white Southerners still honoring the purposes of the Confederacy. While many copies were made, the original was long thought lost. It was held by Pelham's sister, Betty, and kept by her descendants at home in a fireproof safe. In 2010, Pelham's great-great grand-nephew consigned the piece for auction. It sold for $41,825.

In March 2013, the city of Jacksonville, Alabama celebrated Pelham with a weekend of living history campsites and a sesquicentennial recreation of Pelham's funeral procession to City Cemetery.
