= Final Theory =

Final Theory may refer to:

- Theory of everything, a hypothetical coherent theoretical framework of physics containing all physical principles
- Final Theory (novel), a 2008 science fiction novel by Mark Alpert
