= Paynesville, Virginia =

Unincorporated community in Virginia, United States

- Unincorporated community
- Location within Virginia Location within the United States
- Coordinates: 37°19′54″N 81°53′26″W
- Country: United States
- State: Virginia
- County: Buchanan
- Elevation: 2,336 ft (712 m)
- Time zone: UTC-5 (Eastern (EST))
  - Summer (DST): UTC-4 (EDT)
- Area code: 276
- GNIS feature ID: 1497078

Paynesville is an unincorporated community in Buchanan County, Virginia, United States.

Paynesville is located on the West Virginia state line across from Paynesville, West Virginia; it is served by Virginia State Route 83.
