= West Virginia Route 83 =

State highway in West Virginia, United States

West Virginia Route 83

Route information
- Maintained by WVDOH
- Length: 17.7 mi (28.5 km)

Major junctions
- West end: SR 83 near Jolo
- East end: WV 16 in War

Location
- Country: United States
- State: West Virginia
- Counties: McDowell

Highway system
- West Virginia State Highway System; Interstate; US; State
← WV 82	→ WV 84

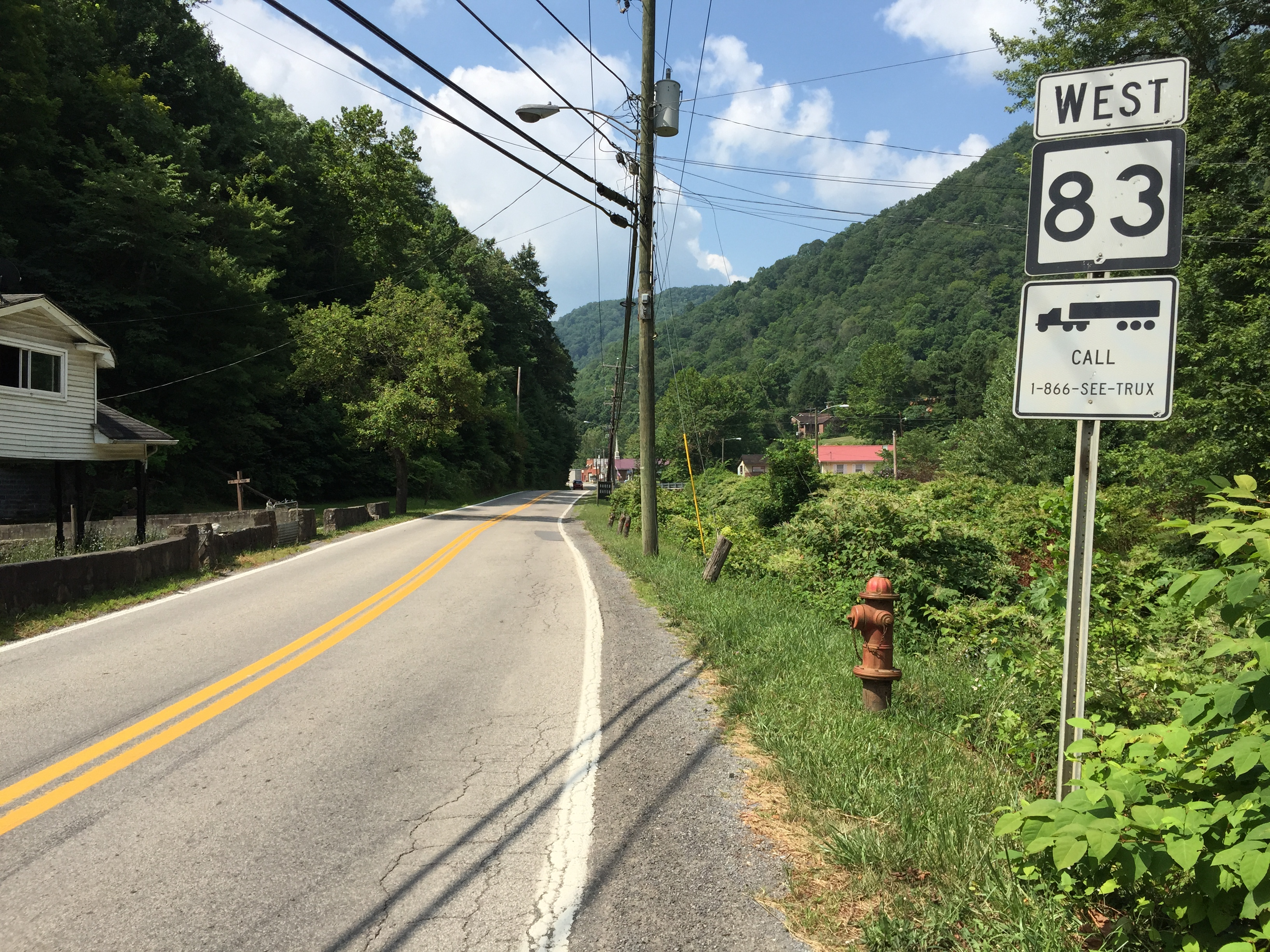
View west along WV 83 in Bradshaw

West Virginia Route 83 is an east–west state highway located within McDowell County, West Virginia. The western terminus is at the Virginia state line six miles (10 km) west of Jolo, where WV 83 continues west as Virginia State Route 83. The eastern terminus is at West Virginia Route 16 in War.

WV 83 is slated to be replaced by the Coalfields Expressway.

== Major intersections ==
The entire route is in McDowell County.

Location	mi	km	Destinations	Notes
Paynesville			SR 83 west – Grundy	
Jolo			WV 635 south	
Bradshaw			WV 80 north – Iaeger	
			WV 16 – Welch, Coalwood, War	
1.000 mi = 1.609 km; 1.000 km = 0.621 mi
