= Nathan Brown (West Virginia politician) =

American politician

Member of the West Virginia House of Delegates from the 20th district
- In office December 1, 2018 – December 1, 2022
- Preceded by: Justin Marcum
- Succeeded by: Geoff Foster

Personal details
- Born: Nathan Duane Brown; May 4, 1979 (age 47) South Williamson, Kentucky, U.S.
- Party: Democratic
- Education: University of Pikeville; University of Charleston (MBA); Appalachian School of Law (JD)

Nathan Duane Brown (born May 4, 1979) is an American politician from West Virginia.

== Early life and education ==
Nathan Brown was born on May 4, 1979, in South Williamson, Kentucky, to parents Brock and Kelly Brown. Nathan graduated from Burch High School. Nathan earned an Accounting degree from the University of Pikeville, an MBA from the University of Charleston, and a J.D. from Appalachian School of Law.

== Career ==
Brown is a private attorney as well as an assistant prosecuting attorney and the attorney of Williamson, West Virginia. In 2012, Brown ran for the West Virginia House of Delegates seat representing the 20th district, but was defeated in the Democratic primary. On November 6, 2018, Brown was elected to the West Virginia House of Delegates, where he represented the 20th district from December 1, 2018, to December 1, 2022.

== Personal life ==
Brown is married to Brandy, and together they have three children. Brown is Christian.
