= Justin Marcum =

American politician

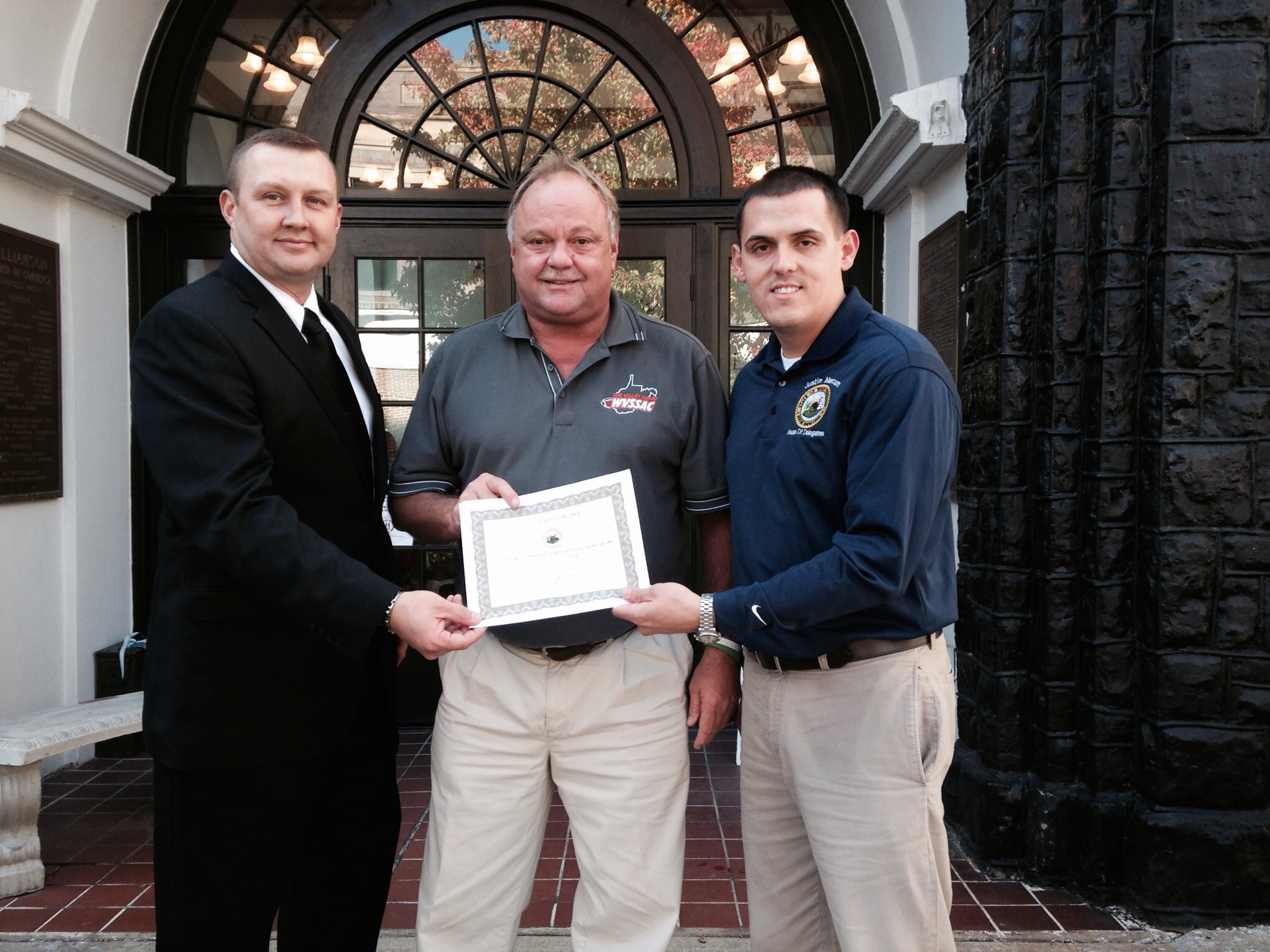
- Justin Marcum (right)

Member of the West Virginia House of Delegates from the 20th district
- In office January 4, 2012 – January 1, 2019
- Succeeded by: Nathan Brown

Personal details
- Born: February 24, 1984 (age 42) West Virginia, U.S.
- Party: Democratic
- Spouse: Tish Marcum
- Children: Tenley Marcum, Kiptyn Marcum
- Education: Marshall University (B.B.A.); Appalachian School of Law (J.D.)
- Occupation: Attorney
- Profession: Business owner
- Committees: Judiciary, Government Organization, Banking, Insurance, Energy, Roads & Transportation
- Website: marcumlawoffice.com

Justin J. Marcum is a former member of the West Virginia House of Delegates, representing Mingo and Logan Counties. Marcum also worked in the coal mines before becoming an attorney. He owns Marcum Law Office, PLLC in Williamson, West Virginia.
