= Tookland, Virginia =

Unincorporated community in Virginia, United States

- Unincorporated community
- Location within Virginia Location within the United States
- Coordinates: 37°15′01″N 82°06′30″W
- Country: United States
- State: Virginia
- County: Buchanan
- Elevation: 1,083 ft (330 m)
- Time zone: UTC−5 (Eastern (EST))
  - Summer (DST): UTC−4 (EDT)
- Area code: 276
- GNIS feature ID: 1496319

Tookland is an unincorporated community in Buchanan County, Virginia, United States. It is located on U.S. Route 460 and Virginia State Route 83, 2 miles (3.2 km) south of Grundy.
