= Jolo, West Virginia =

Jolo
- Unincorporated community
- Location within the state of West Virginia Jolo (the United States)
- Coordinates: 37°19′45″N 81°48′53″W
- Country: United States
- State: West Virginia
- County: McDowell
- Time zone: UTC-5 (Eastern (EST))
  - Summer (DST): UTC-4 (EDT)
- ZIP codes: 24850
- GNIS feature ID: 1554825

Jolo (pronounced "Joe-Lowe") is an unincorporated community on West Virginia Route 83 in McDowell County in the U.S. state of West Virginia. The community was mentioned in the book Salvation on Sand Mountain by Dennis Covington for being the home of the Church of the Lord Jesus with Signs Following, a renowned snake handling church. Services at the church have been filmed and widely shown on television.

The name, according to a grandson of the postmaster, derives from the name of the son of the first postmaster, John Crockett Lowe. Crockett was the postmaster of a substation of the Bradshaw Post Office two miles from Jolo. Because the mail went first to Bradshaw, it frequently got mixed up. To prevent this mixup the US Post Office decided the substation needed to have its own name. The USPO then asked Crockett to recommend names. As Crockett watched his son, Joe, and a friend, Bogle Day, play in the yard he wrote down their names and came up with the names Jolo and Boda. He submitted these two names and the USPO chose the name Jolo for the post office. Their post office is still active.

The community is mentioned in the 2008 novel Final Theory.

== Notable people ==
- Cliff Waldron, bluegrass musician
