= Vansant, Virginia =

- Census-designated place (CDP)
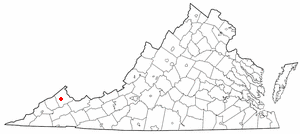
- Location of Vansant, Virginia
- Coordinates: 37°13′36″N 82°5′56″W
- Country: United States
- State: Virginia
- County: Buchanan

Area
  - Total: 7.8 sq mi (20.3 km^{2})
  - Land: 7.8 sq mi (20.3 km^{2})
  - Water: 0 sq mi (0.0 km^{2})
- Elevation: 1,129 ft (344 m)

Population (2010)
  - Total: 470
  - Density: 60/sq mi (23/km^{2})
- Time zone: UTC−5 (Eastern (EST))
  - Summer (DST): UTC−4 (EDT)
- ZIP code: 24656
- Area code: 276
- FIPS code: 51-80608
- GNIS feature ID: 1500252

Vansant is a census-designated place (CDP) in Buchanan County, Virginia, United States. As of the 2020 census, Vansant had a population of 442. Vansant is located just south of the town of Grundy.

== Geography ==
Vansant is located at 37°13′36″N 82°5′56″W (37.226587, −82.098787). The town is located at the intersection of U.S. Route 460 and State Route 83, directly on the banks of the Levisa Fork. Vansant is located in the coalfields of the Appalachian Mountains.

According to the United States Census Bureau, the CDP has a total area of 7.8 square miles (20.3 km^{2}), all land.

== Demographics ==
At the 2000 census, there were 989 people, 436 households and 309 families residing in the CDP. The population density was 125.9 per square mile (48.6/km^{2}). There were 500 housing units at an average density of 63.7/sq mi (24.6/km^{2}). The racial makeup of the CDP was 98.89% White, 0.61% Asian, and 0.51% from two or more races. Hispanic or Latino of any race were 0.30% of the population.

There were 436 households, of which 24.3% had children under the age of 18 living with them, 54.8% were married couples living together, 12.4% had a female householder with no husband present, and 29.1% were non-families. 25.9% of all households were made up of individuals, and 11.0% had someone living alone who was 65 years of age or older. The average household size was 2.27 and the average family size was 2.73.

Age distribution was 19.0% under the age of 18, 6.6% from 18 to 24, 27.8% from 25 to 44, 31.9% from 45 to 64, and 14.8% who were 65 years of age or older. The median age was 43 years. For every 100 females, there were 89.1 males. For every 100 females age 18 and over, there were 85.8 males.

The median household income was $26,250, and the median family income was $30,104. Males had a median income of $28,068 versus $20,714 for females. The per capita income for the CDP was $13,743. About 14.7% of families and 17.1% of the population were below the poverty line, including 30.0% of those under age 18 and 10.6% of those age 65 or over.
