= North Fork Pound Reservoir =

North Fork of Pound Lake
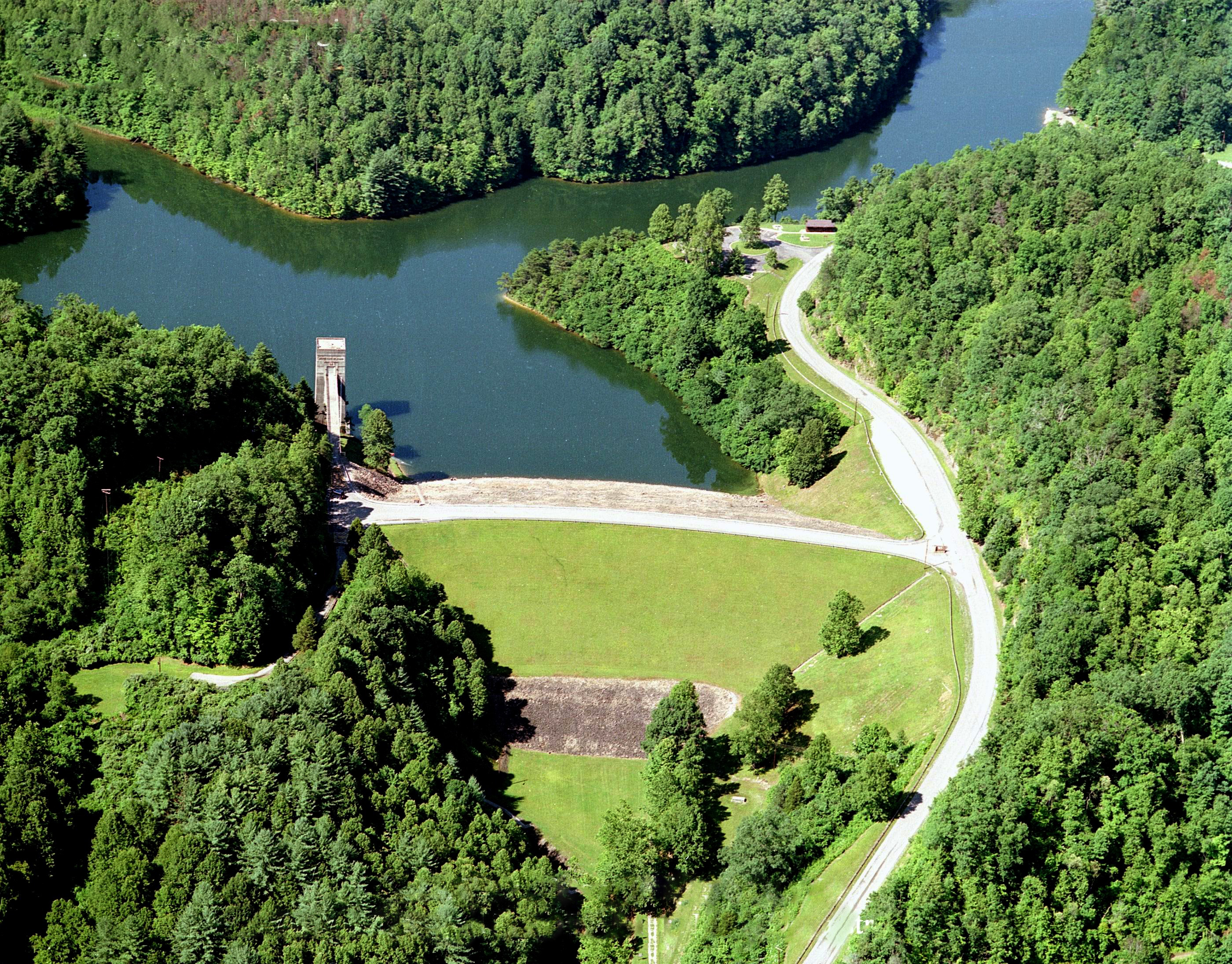

- Location within Virginia Location within the United States
- Location: Wise County, Virginia, United States
- Coordinates: 37°07′29″N 82°37′50″W
- Type: reservoir
- Primary inflows: North Fork Pound River
- Primary outflows: North Fork Pound River
- Basin countries: United States
- Surface area: 154 acres (62 ha)
- Average depth: 19 feet (6 m)
- Max. depth: 55 feet (17 m)
- Shore length^{1}: 13.5 miles (21.7 m)
- Surface elevation: 1,601 feet (488 m)
- ^{1} Shore length is not a well-defined measure.

North Fork Pound Reservoir (also known as North Fork of Pound Lake) is a reservoir in Wise County, Virginia. It was built in 1966 as authorised by the Flood Control Act of 1960 and managed by the United States Army Corps of Engineers.

== General ==
The North Fork of Pound River is a part of the upper reaches of the Big Sandy system. On its way to the Ohio River, the waters from North Fork flow northeast and meet the South Fork River to form the Pound River. The Pound River then flows into the John W. Flannagan Dam which empties into the Russell Fork River near Haysi, Virginia. The Russell Fork cuts through the Allegheny Mountain range to join the Levisa Fork then meets the Tug Fork at Louisa and forms the Big Sandy River.

== History ==
Construction began in 1966 by the U.S. Army Corps of Engineers under the Flood Control Act of 1960. The rock fill dam was completed in 1963 at a cost of $6.2 million. The dam is 122 feet (37 m) high and 600 feet (180 m) long. Water releases from the dam are controlled by three gates (3 feet wide, 6 feet (1.8 m) high) located in the intake structure. Lake elevation is maintained at 1,611 feet (491 m) above sea level. During the fall the lake elevation is lowered 10 feet (3.0 m) to hold water from fall and spring runoff. The lake covers 154 acres (0.62 km^{2}) and includes 13.5 miles (21.7 km) of wooded shoreline. The U.S. Forest Service obtained ownership of the lands surrounding the lake in 1983.

== See also ==
- Lakes of Virginia
- US Army Corps of Engineers
- Pound, Virginia
- John W. Flanagan Dam and Reservoir
