= Pokahuntas Bell =

Bell made for the 1907 Jamestown Exposition

Named for the Indian chief's daughter Pocahontas, the Pokahuntas Bell was created in 1907 to hang in the Kentucky Building, a recreation of Fort Boonesborough, at the Jamestown Exposition.

The push to create the bell was led by the Pocahontas Bell Association, created by Anna S. Green of Culpeper, Virginia. The author Livia Nye Simpson Poffenbarger was a lifetime member of the group.

Crafted in the McShane Foundry in Baltimore, Maryland, it contained a melted-down spur from Confederate Major John Pelham, a bracelet from Chief Pugallop, an armour plate from the CSS Virginia warship and nails from Libby prison. Edith Wilson, the future First Lady of the United States, gave a key to her New Jersey home to include in the cast. The plating was donated by the United States Navy, in a joint resolution.

Scheduled for presentation for May 18, the bell was formally presented on June 15, at a ceremony hosted by Virginia governor Claude A. Swanson. The Exposition's general counsel T. J. Wool and Major Hunter were both present.

It was intended for the Bell to be given to the University of Virginia after the close of the Exposition. However shortly after the Governor announced this fact, there was dispute about where it should ultimately be sent.
