= West Virginia Route 705 =

State highway in West Virginia, United States

West Virginia Route 705
- WV 705 highlighted in red

Route information
- Maintained by WVDOH
- Length: 3.5 mi (5.6 km)

Major junctions
- West end: US 19 / WV 7 in Morgantown
- East end: US 119 in Morgantown

Location
- Country: United States
- State: West Virginia
- Counties: Monongalia

Highway system
- West Virginia State Highway System; Interstate; US; State
← WV 635	→ WV 807

West Virginia Route 705 is a short east–west state highway partially located within the Monongalia County city of Morgantown in the U.S. state of West Virginia. The western terminus of the route is at U.S. Route 19 and West Virginia Route 7, directly in front of the WVU Coliseum. The eastern terminus is at U.S. Route 119 near the Morgantown Municipal Airport. The route is major road in northern Morgantown. It is maintained by the West Virginia Department of Transportation.

== Route description ==
=== Patteson Drive (mileposts 0.0 to 0.7) ===
WV 705 begins as Patteson Drive in front of the WVU Coliseum entrance. Patteson Drive is named after former West Virginia governor Okey L. Patteson. It travels to the east-northeast toward WVU's Ruby Memorial Hospital. Patteson Drive carries two lanes in each direction and has left turn lanes for its entire length. Located on this segment of the road are several restaurants, churches, and other businesses. This section of road ends at University Avenue, past which the road continues as Van Voorhis Road.

=== Van Voorhis Road (mileposts 0.7 to 1.2) ===
Van Voorhis Road is a short segment of WV 705 in the Suncrest neighborhood of Morgantown. Still four lanes with a shared left turn lane, Van Voorhis Road begins at University Avenue and then turns sharply north at Elmer Prince Drive as it skirts the western edge of the West Virginia University Health Sciences Campus. As Van Voorhis Road continues to the north, WV 705 turns to the right onto Chestnut Ridge Road at a four-way intersection with that road and Burroughs Street

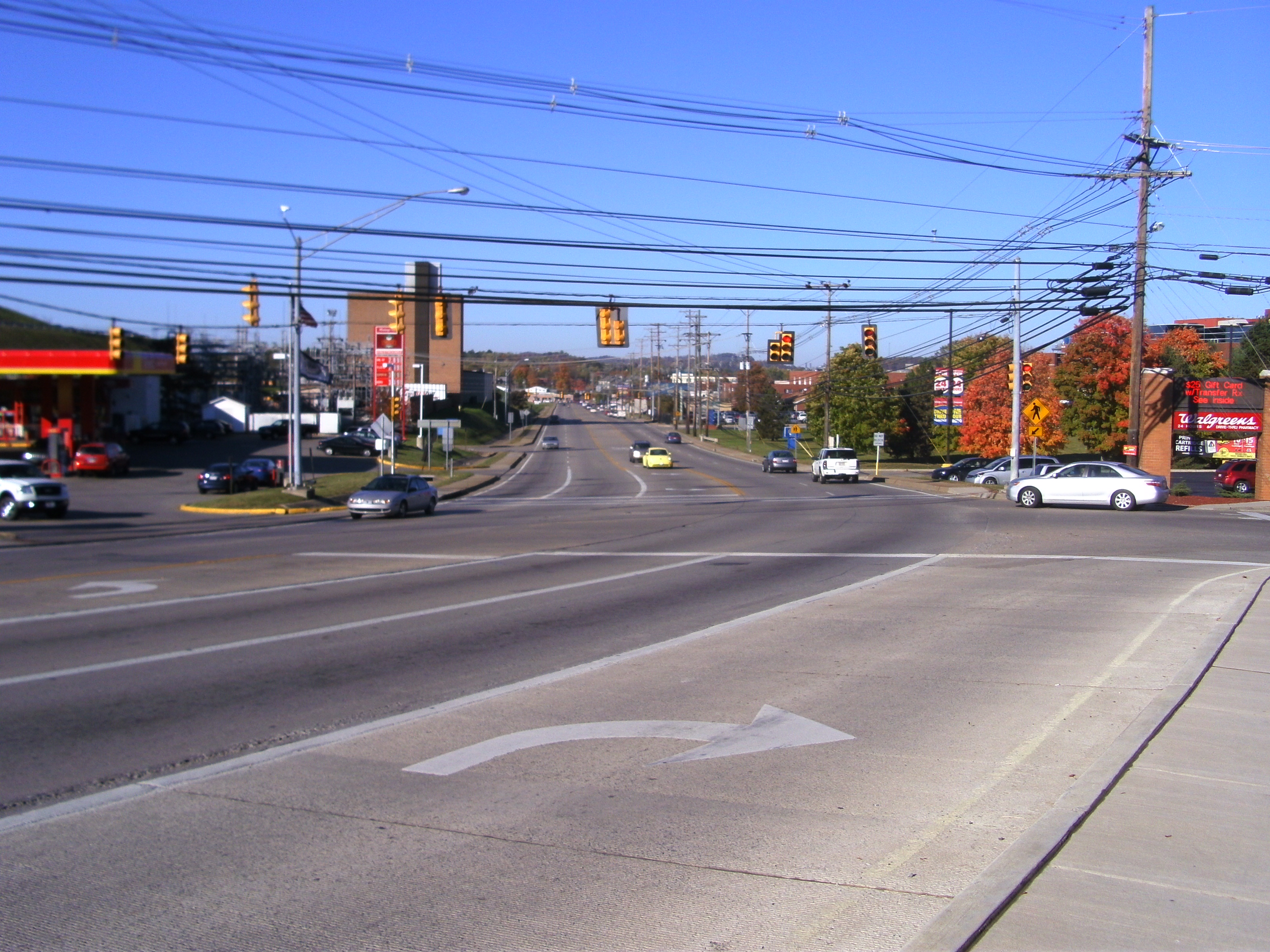
WV 705 travels west as Chestnut Ridge Rd. in Morgantown after an intersection with Pineview Dr.

=== Chestnut Ridge Road (mileposts 1.2 to 1.8) ===
Now on the northern edge of the WVU Health Sciences Campus, WV 705 heads east as Chestnut Ridge Road. Chestnut Ridge Road passes the Suburban Center, a small shopping center, Mylan Pharmaceuticals, and North Elementary School. It then intersects Pineview Drive, which provides access to Monongalia General Hospital, turns to the southeast, and ends one block later at Willowdale Road, which provides access to Ruby Memorial Hospital.

=== Route 705 (mileposts 1.8 to 3.5) ===
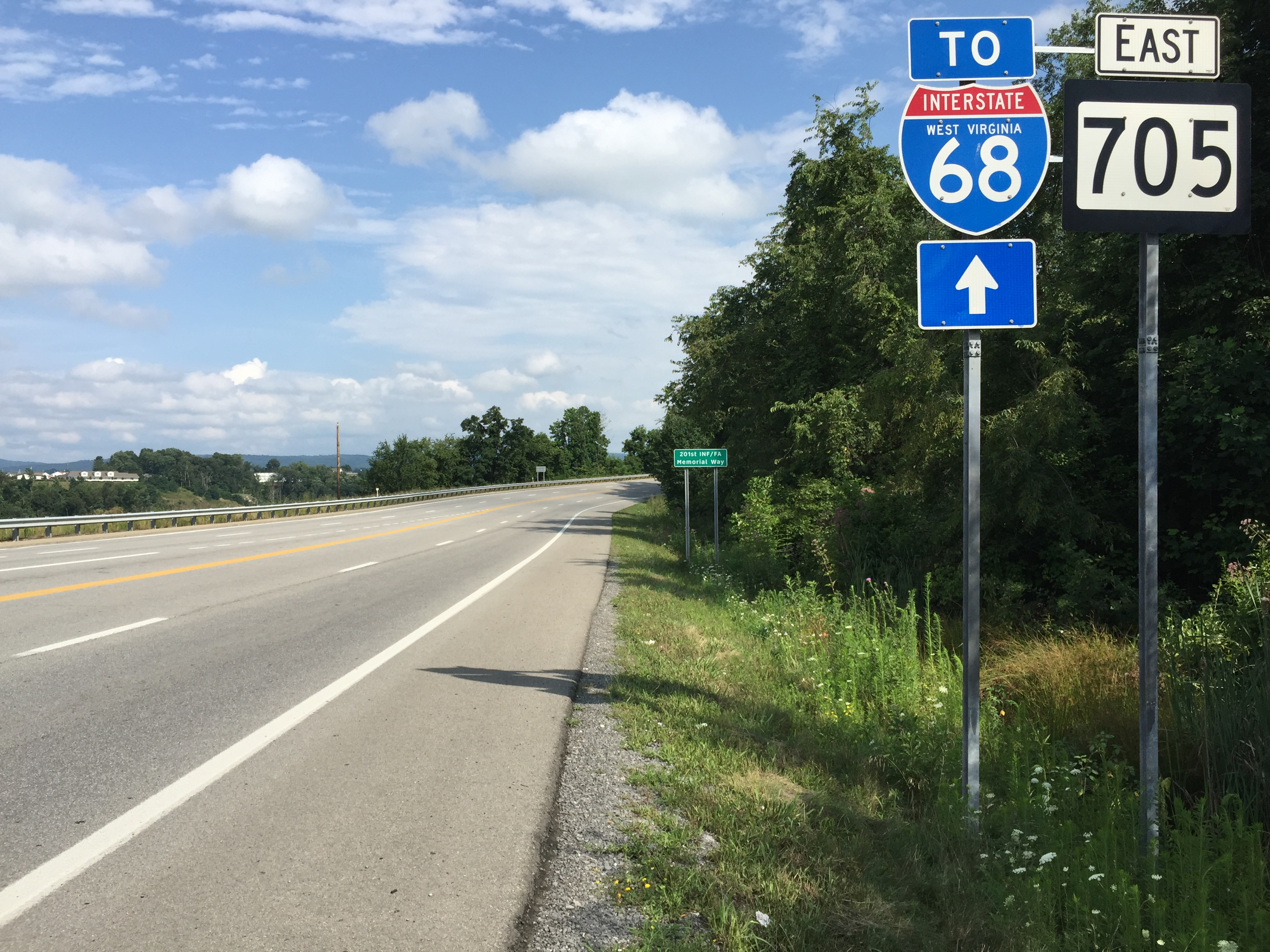
View east along WV 705 at CR 67 (Stewartstown Road) in Chestnut Ridge

The rest of 705 is simply known as "705". Officially, it is named the 201st Memorial Highway. Between Willowdale Rd. and Stewartstown Road, The area to the south of Route 705 is known as the "Big Dig" due to several recent development projects in the area. Several apartment complexes surround this segment of the highway also. After Stewartstown Rd., Route 705 becomes a two-lane road with left-turn lanes for the first time. As of October 2009, 705 was widened to three lanes from Stewartstown Road to the Mileground. Once at the Mileground US 119, the right lane becomes a right-turn lane and the left a left-turn lane. As for the other direction, it originates with only one lane towards Stewartstown Road, until midway between Mileground and Stewartstown Road, then it widens to a full 4-lane highway. Other upgrades, such as an acceleration lane from Stewartstown Road, and a new left-turn lane onto Stewartstown Road were also added, alone with new stoplights to accommodate the new Suncrest Towne Center.

== Major intersections ==
The entire route is in Monongalia County.

Location	mi	km	Destinations	Notes
Morgantown	0.0	0.0	US 19 / WV 7 (Monongahela Boulevard) to I-79	
Morgantown			Burroughs Street / Van Voorhis Road	
	2.7	4.3	CR 67 (Stewartstown Road)	
	3.5	5.6	US 119 (Mileground Road) to I-68	roundabout
1.000 mi = 1.609 km; 1.000 km = 0.621 mi
