= Sandy River Reservoir =

- Location within Virginia
- Interactive map of Sandy River Reservoir
- Location: Prince Edward County, Virginia
- Coordinates: 37.2415°N 78.3149°W
- Type: Reservoir
- River sources: Sandy River
- Basin countries: United States
- Managing agency: Virginia Department of Game and Inland Fisheries
- Built: 1994
- Surface area: 740 acres (300 ha)
- Max. depth: 30 feet (9.1 m)
- Shore length^{1}: 21.25 miles (34.20 km)
- Surface elevation: 960 feet (290 m)
- Settlements: Farmville, Virginia
- Website: Virginia DWR
- ^{1} Shore length is not a well-defined measure.

Sandy River Reservoir is a 740-acre (300 ha) water supply reservoir located slightly east of the town of Farmville (and South of Rice) in Prince Edward County. The Sandy River Reservoir is one of the newest lakes in Virginia with construction completed in 1994 and fishing opened in 1996. The reservoir was built in and is owned by the county of Prince Edward with fisheries management responsibilities belonging to the Virginia Department of Game and Inland Fisheries.
