= Lake Orange =

Reservoir in North Carolina

Coordinates: 36°09′09″N 79°08′50″W

- Location: Cedar Grove, Orange County, North Carolina
- Type: Reservoir
- Surface area: 150 acres (61 ha)

Lake Orange is a freshwater reservoir in Cedar Grove, Orange County, North Carolina, located on the east fork of the Eno River. It is fed by Lick Creek. The lake was created in the 1960s, when five local farmers donated 205 acres of land to the county for the creation of a reservoir. It has an area of 150 acres. The invasive Hydrilla plant is thought to have gotten into the Eno via Lake Orange, where it was first discovered in the 1990s. It provides the town of Hillsborough, North Carolina with water. Lake Orange began to run low on water by 1993, and West Fork Eno Reservoir was constructed to provide additional water to the community.
