= John W. Flannagan Dam =

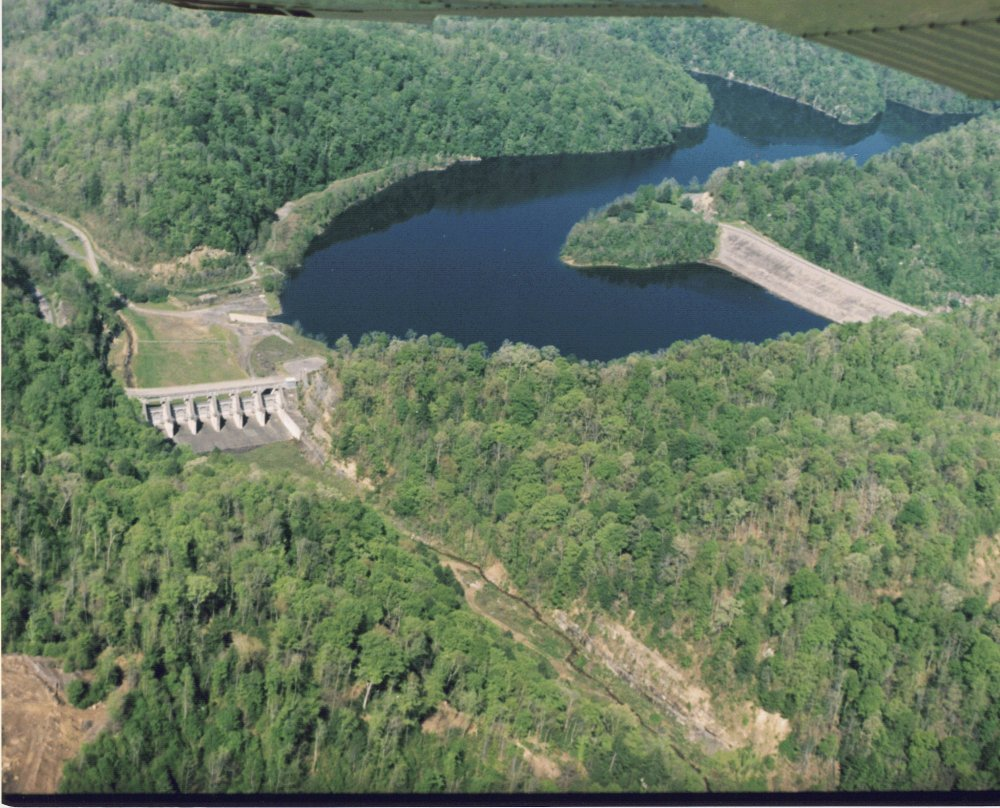
- Interactive map of John W. Flannagan Dam
- Country: United States
- Location: Dickenson County, Virginia
- Coordinates: 37°14′00″N 82°20′41″W
- Purpose: Flood control
- Status: Operational
- Construction began: 1960
- Opening date: 1964
- Owner: U.S. Army Corps of Engineers

Dam and spillways
- Type of dam: Earth fill
- Impounds: Pound River
- Height: 250 ft (76 m)
- Length: 916 ft (279 m)

Reservoir
- Creates: John W. Flannagan Reservoir
- Catchment area: 221 sq mi (570 km^{2})
- Surface area: 1,145 acres (463 ha)
- Normal elevation: 1,396 ft (426 m)

John W. Flannagan Dam is a flood control dam located in the Cumberland Mountains of Dickenson County, Virginia. It forms the John W. Flannagan Reservoir behind it. It was named after Congressman John Williams Flannagan Jr.

== History ==
The Russell Fork river, which is a tributary of the Levisa River (which long constituted the boundary between Kentucky and what became West Virginia during the American Civil War), was notorious for it nearly impassable whitewater and old growth forests as well as flooding. In 1900, slightly downstream where the Russell Fork crosses the Virginia/Kentucky border at the Breaks canyon, a sign warned travellers "Proceed Further at Your Own Risk". Between 1906 and 1910, the Yellow Poplar Lumber Company of Coal Grove, Ohio undertook one of the most ambitious logging operations in Appalachia, employing over 525 men and more than 22,500 pounds of dynamite and a million pounds of concrete to build roads and a splashdam as well, as log the massive yellow poplar trees. In 1909, a 500-pound dynamite charge blasted Jerry's Rock, which obstructed the Russell Fork at the Breaks, and on December 4, 1909, other charges destroyed the splashdam, sending a wave of water and 36,000 logs downriver through the gorge. The construction massively altered hydroilogy in the area, but enabled logs to be floated downriver to the lumber company's sawmills for further processing. After the splashdam event, rafts of 60 logs would be floated over the still twisty whitewater thee days to Catlettsburg, Kentucky, where they were assembled into larger fleets for further travel downstream to the mills.

The lumber company owned land later used for railroad construction and coal and gas extraction, but nearly went bankrupt before the Great Depression, by which time some of the land had reforested. Area politicians proposed creating a national park during the Great Depression, and Civilian Conservation Corps crews worked in the Jefferson National Forest nearby, but financial accommodations could not be made with the lumber company and a railroad, so instead many acres became Breaks Interstate Park in 1954. In 1938 Congress passed the Flood Control Act of 1938, but dam construction upstream of the Breaks was only funded more than two decades later, by the Federal Water Pollution Control Act Amendments of 1961. John W. Flannagan Jr. represented the area from 1931 until 1949, and lobbied for construction of the dam and reservoir now named for him and part of the Big Sandy flood protection system. The U.S. Army Corps of Engineers designed and supervised construction of the dam and now operates it for public benefits.

== Construction ==
Construction of the dam, spillway, and outlet works began in 1960, and was completed by 1964. The dam is 250 feet (76 m) high and 916 feet (279 m) long. The earth-filled dam is constructed of rock with a central clay core, which prevents water from passing through the dam. A 1,145-acre (463 ha) lake is formed behind the dam with almost 40 miles (64 km) of shoreline. South of the dam is the emergency spillway. The spillway contains six 42-by-38-foot (13 by 12 m) gates used to control high water and prevent the lake from flowing over the top of the dam. The outlet works consist of an intake structure and an outlet tunnel. The 262-foot (80 m)-high intake structure is located north of the dam, and contains 8-by-4-foot (2.4 by 1.2 m) gates which control the amount of water released into Russell Fork River.

== General information ==
Built primarily for flood control, the lake surface is kept at an elevation of 1,396 feet (426 m) above sea level for recreation during the summer. During the fall, the lake is lowered 16 feet (4.9 m) to hold additional water from winter and spring runoff. When flooding occurs, the gates in the intake structure are closed to the minimum level. The water, which runs off from the 221-square-mile (570 km^{2}) drainage basin behind the dam, is stored in the reservoir to protect life and property downstream. When the danger of downstream flooding has passed, the intake structure gates are opened to lower the reservoir. Opening the gates is coordinated with other dams on the Big Sandy River and Ohio Rivers as a part of a larger flood control system. The dam has prevented millions of dollars of damage in excess of the $20 million it cost to build.

Restrooms are located at the Project Office, Below Dam Area, Junction Area, Cranesnest Area #1, and #3, Lower Twin Area, Spillway Area, and Pound River Area. During the first four full weekends in October Flannagan has whitewater releases to achieve winter pool. From the dam, the first two miles (3 km) are class II rapids which progresses downstream reaching Class V + rapids. Some of the most challenging rapids in the eastern U.S. can be found while traveling through Breaks Interstate Park with names like 20 Stitches, Broken Nose and Triple Drop.

John W. Flannagan Boat Dock (marina) is located at the Junction Area and provides visitors with docking facilities, a gas station, fishing supplies, and a snack bar.

== See also ==
- North Fork Pound Reservoir
- Pound River
