= Lake Culpeper =

Reservoir in Culpeper, Virginia

- Location in Virginia
- Location: Culpeper, Culpeper County, Virginia, United States
- Coordinates: 38.4654°N 78.0279°W
- Type: Reservoir
- Primary inflows: Mountain Run
- Primary outflows: Mountain Run
- Basin countries: United States
- Surface area: 255 acres (103 ha)
- Water volume: 3,720 acre-feet (4,590,000 m^{3})
- Surface elevation: 342 feet (104 m)

Lake Culpeper (formerly Lake Pelham) is a 255 acres (103 ha) reservoir in Culpeper, Virginia. The reservoir was completed in 1972 as part of the Mountain Run watershed project to provide municipal water supply, sediment control, and downstream flood control.

== History ==
The reservoir was constructed in cooperation with the Natural Resources Conservation Service and the Culpeper Soil and Water Conservation District as part of a broader watershed program addressing erosion, flooding, and rural water-supply needs.

In 2018, the Mountain Run Dam underwent a major rehabilitation project, including spillway improvements and structural upgrades, to meet contemporary dam-safety standards and extend the service life of the reservoir.

In 2023, the Virginia Board on Geographic Names approved changing the official name of the reservoir from Lake Pelham to Lake Culpeper.

== Hydrology and management ==
Mountain Run serves as the inflow and outflow for the reservoir, which is impounded by the Mountain Run Dam (Dam No. 50). The dam forms part of a regional watershed system that reduces downstream flooding risk and stabilizes sediment transport in the basin.

The Town of Culpeper manages the reservoir as a primary component of its drinking-water system.

== Ecology ==
The Virginia Department of Wildlife Resources identifies several warm-water fish species in the lake, including largemouth bass, bluegill, channel catfish, black crappie, and yellow perch.

Water-quality conditions in the reservoir have been documented in academic research, including a Virginia Tech study examining nutrient concentrations, sedimentation, and seasonal mixing patterns.

== Recreation ==
Lake Culpeper is open for public recreation, including boating and shoreline fishing. Electric motors are permitted, and public access is available at designated areas managed with local authorities.

== See also ==
- List of lakes in Virginia
