= Buchanan County Courthouse (Virginia) =

- U.S. National Register of Historic Places
- Virginia Landmarks Register
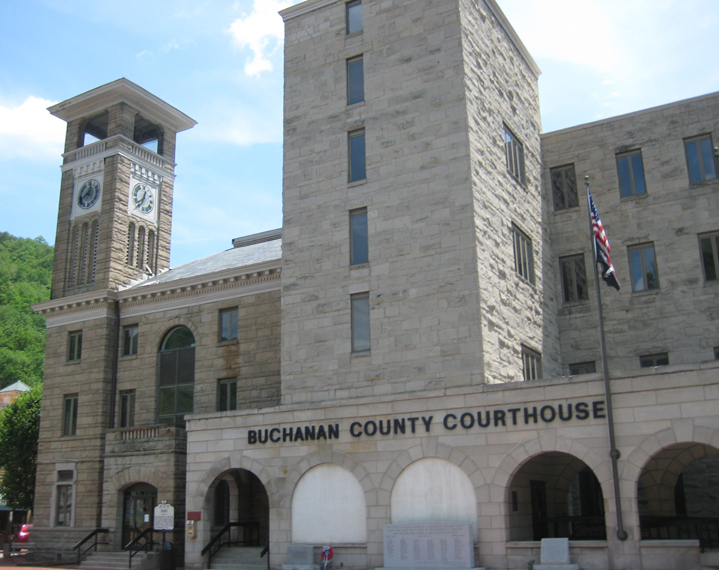
- Buchanan County Courthouse, May 2009

- Location within Virginia Location within the United States
- Interactive map showing the location of Buchanan County Courthouse
- Location: Walnut and Main Sts., Grundy, Virginia
- Coordinates: 37°16′40″N 82°5′57″W
- Built: 1905
- Architect: Milburn, Franklin Pierce
- Architectural style: Renaissance
- NRHP reference No.: 82004545
- VLR No.: 229-0001

Significant dates
- Added to NRHP: September 16, 1982
- Designated VLR: July 20, 1982

The Buchanan County Courthouse is a historic courthouse building located at Grundy, Buchanan County, Virginia. It was built in 1905–06. The Renaissance Revival style building is the only building in the downtown with pretensions to architectural sophistication. Designed by architect Frank Pierce Milburn, the design employs local stone, emphasized with a corner clock tower topped with a belvedere. A 1915 fire gutted most of the downtown, including the courthouse, which was rebuilt and expanded by 1917.

It was listed on the National Register of Historic Places in 1982.
