= Paynesville, Virginia and West Virginia =

Paynesville
- Unincorporated community
- Location within the state of West Virginia Paynesville (the United States)
- Coordinates: 37°19′53″N 81°53′29″W
- Country: United States
- States: Virginia, West Virginia
- Counties: Buchanan (VA), McDowell (WV)
- Elevation: 2,346 ft (715 m)
- Time zone: UTC-5 (Eastern (EST))
  - Summer (DST): UTC-4 (EDT)
- ZIP code: 24873
- Area codes: 304 & 681
- GNIS feature ID: 1549869

Paynesville is an unincorporated community in McDowell County, West Virginia and Buchanan County, Virginia, United States. Paynesville is located along West Virginia Route 83, encompassing both states. Paynesville has a post office with ZIP code 24873.

On May 29, 1961, Paynesville residents Mr. and Mrs. Alderson Muncy were the first people in the United States to receive food stamps under the modern food stamp program. They received $95 for their 15-person household.

== Climate ==
The climate in this area is characterized by hot, humid summers and generally mild to cool winters. According to the Köppen Climate Classification system, Paynesville has a humid subtropical climate, abbreviated "Cfa" on climate maps.
