= Grundy, Virginia =

- Town
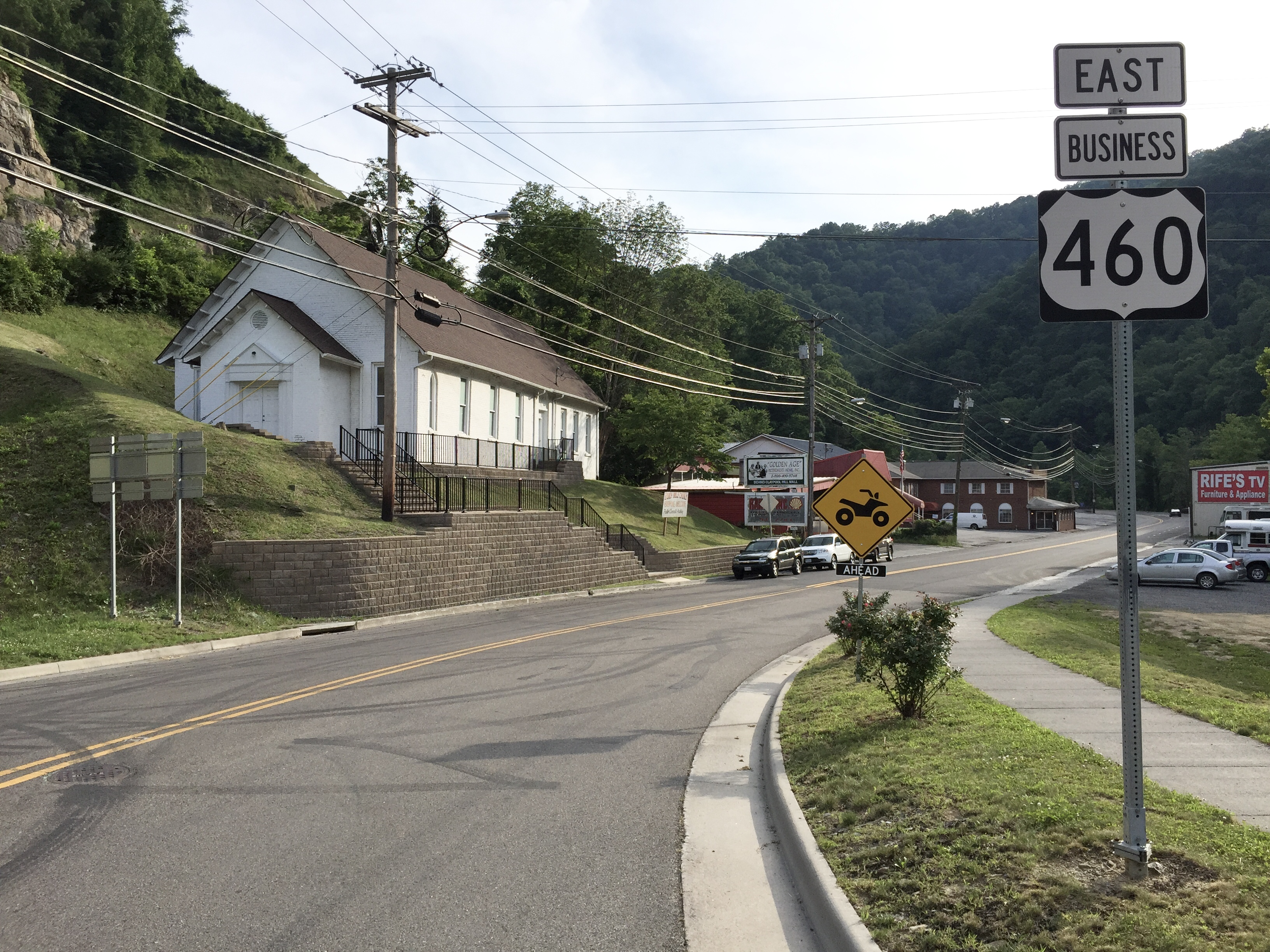
- U.S. Route 460 Business in Grundy

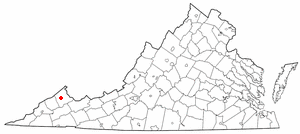
- Location of Grundy in Buchanan County, Virginia
- Coordinates: 37°16′40.40″N 82°05′56.48″W
- Country: United States
- State: Virginia
- County: Buchanan
- Founded: 1858
- Incorporated: 1876

Government
  - Mayor: Chris Mitchell

Area
  - Total: 5.040 sq mi (13.053 km^{2})
  - Land: 4.986 sq mi (12.913 km^{2})
  - Water: 0.054 sq mi (0.139 km^{2})
- Elevation: 1,060 ft (323 m)

Population (2020)
  - Total: 875
  - Estimate (2023): 837
  - Density: 167.9/sq mi (64.82/km^{2})
- Time zone: UTC−5 (Eastern (EST))
  - Summer (DST): UTC−4 (EDT)
- ZIP Code: 24614
- Area code: 276
- FIPS code: 51-33648
- GNIS feature ID: 1498485
- Sales tax: 5.3%
- Website: townofgrundy.com

Grundy is a town in Buchanan County, Virginia, United States, an area located within the Appalachian Mountains region. It is the county seat of Buchanan County. The town is home to the Appalachian School of Law. The population was 875 at the 2020 census.

Legislation establishing Buchanan County in 1858 designated a plot of land at the confluence of the Levisa Fork River and Slate Creek as the seat of government for the county and directed the erection of the county courthouse on the plot, which marked the beginnings of what would be Grundy.

Although originally developed along the Levisa Fork River, which provided a transportation and power waterway, the town suffered from nine major floods since 1929 that have caused extensive damage, the last of which occurred in 1977. It is notable for having major businesses relocated in the 21st century to higher ground to prevent such damage in the future. A mountain opposite the historic town was blasted to provide a kind of plateau where much of the town was relocated and redeveloped. The federal project included construction of bridges and a flood wall, as well as the relocation of some roadways.

During the American Civil War, the town served as a stop-over for Union troops on their way to the Battle of Saltville.

== History ==
The town, founded in 1858 upon the formation of Buchanan County, was named for Felix Grundy, United States Attorney General (1838–1839) and United States Senator from Tennessee (1839–1840). It was incorporated in 1876. The present courthouse dates from 1905 and has been listed on the National Register of Historic Places since 1982. Since the late 19th century, this area depended on coal mining as the basis of its economy. The decline in mining resulted in a loss of jobs and population.

=== Civil War events ===
In October 1864, Union raiders under Brigadier General Stephen G. Burbridge passed through Grundy on their way to destroy the saltworks near Saltville in Smyth County. There they were met by Confederate troops commanded by Brigadier General Alfred E. Jackson at the Battle of Saltville. The Union troops were defeated in the battle, but returned later and succeeded in destroying the saltworks.

=== Red Jacket Mine explosion ===
On April 25, 1938, a catastrophic mine explosion happened in the Keen Mountain Coal Mine. Forty-five were killed and three injured. This is widely regarded as one of the worst mining disasters in Virginia's history. The disaster was reported in the Charleston Gazette.

=== Grundy Flood-Control Project ===
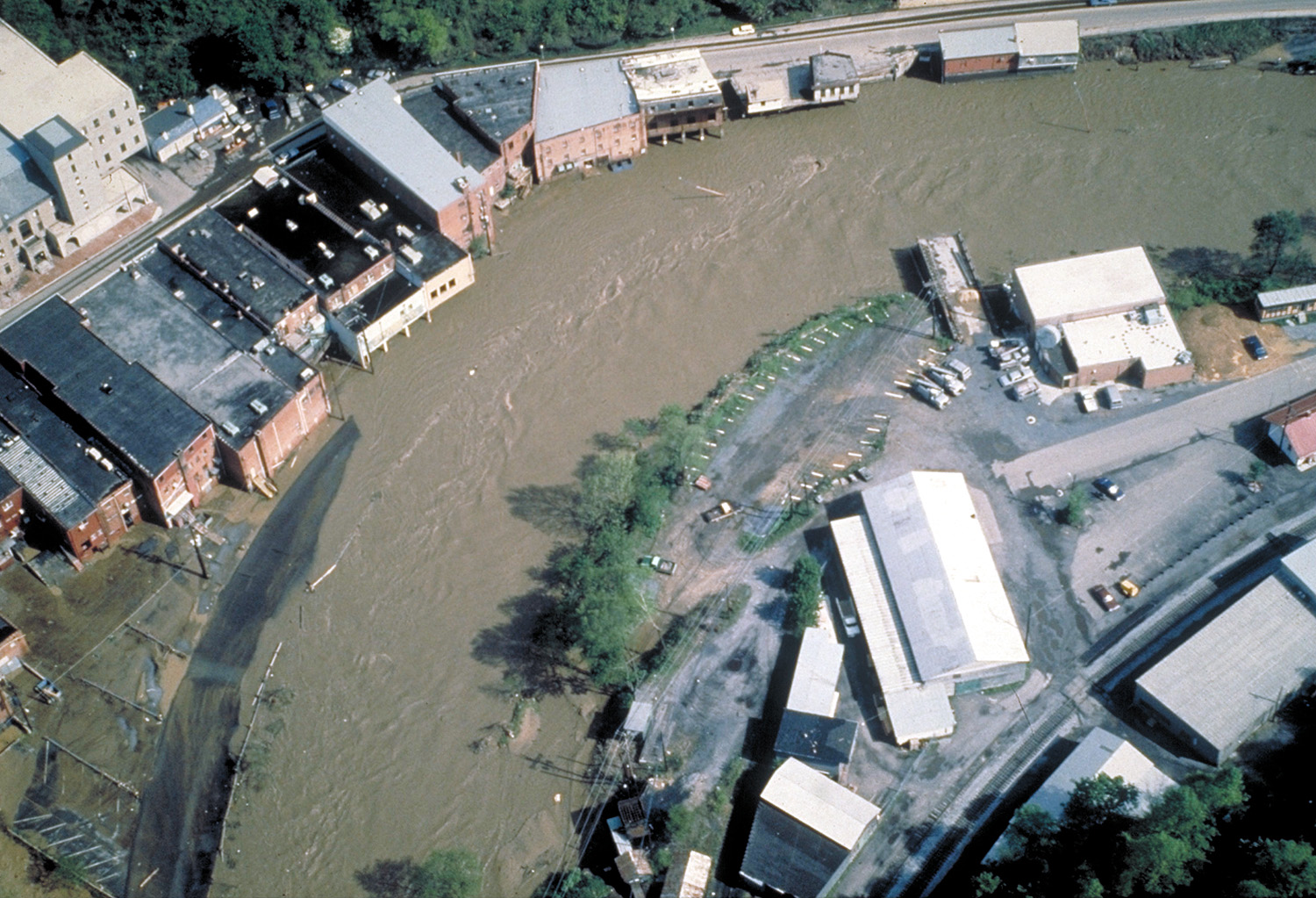
Aerial view of flooding on the Levisa Fork River in Grundy, Virginia in 1984

Since 1929, Grundy has suffered nine major floods of the adjoining Levisa Fork River. After the inundation of April 4, 1977, many businesses did not reopen, and owners abandoned the buildings that housed them. In 1984, another flood again damaged many of the local businesses.

A 21st-century project to relocate much of the town to higher ground has been completed. The project started in 2001. The mountain on the other side of the Levisa Fork was blasted to create 13 acres (53,000 m^{2}) of relatively level land. After a few years of blasting, utilities were placed and new bridges were built across the river. A new town center on the west bank features a multi-level Walmart with a parking deck.

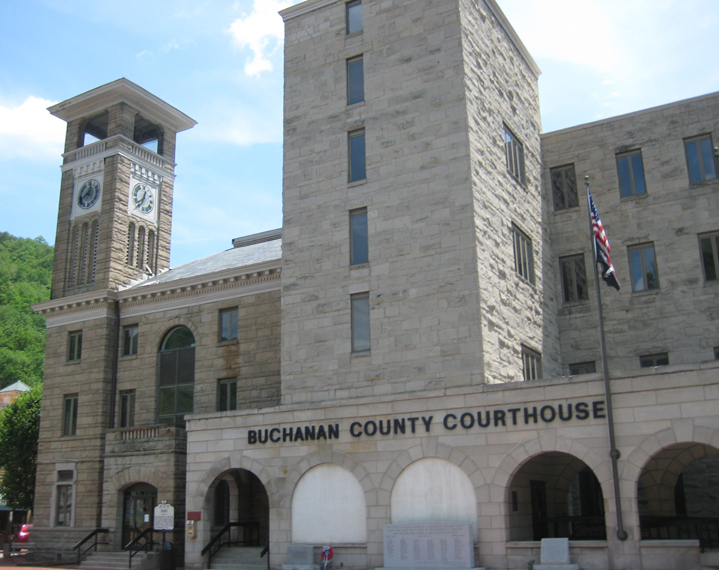
Buchanan County Courthouse in 2009

Buildings backing on the river have been demolished, and a new flood wall protects the county courthouse. U.S. Route 460 was relocated to the top of the flood wall. Businesses formerly located downtown were relocated to an industrial building located just outside town. State Route 83 will be rerouted to meet U.S. Route 460 down the street where U.S. Route 460 originally took a directional split to go through downtown Grundy. Additional work upriver is under study to reroute U.S. Route 460 inland from its current path.

=== Base of a regional grocery store chain ===
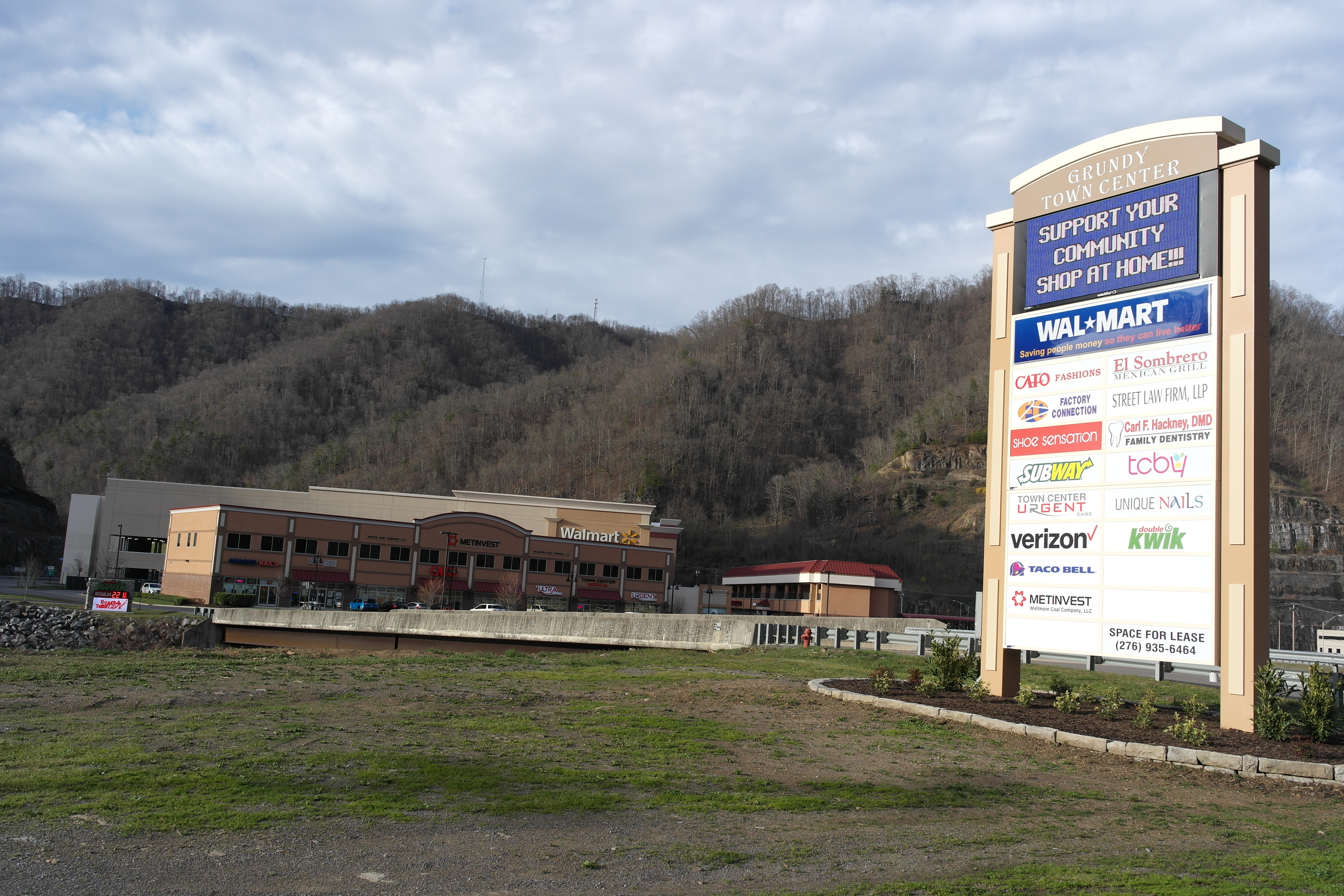
Grundy Town Center was built as part of a $200 million redevelopment which included a Walmart store built on top of a two-story parking garage, the only one of its kind in the United States.

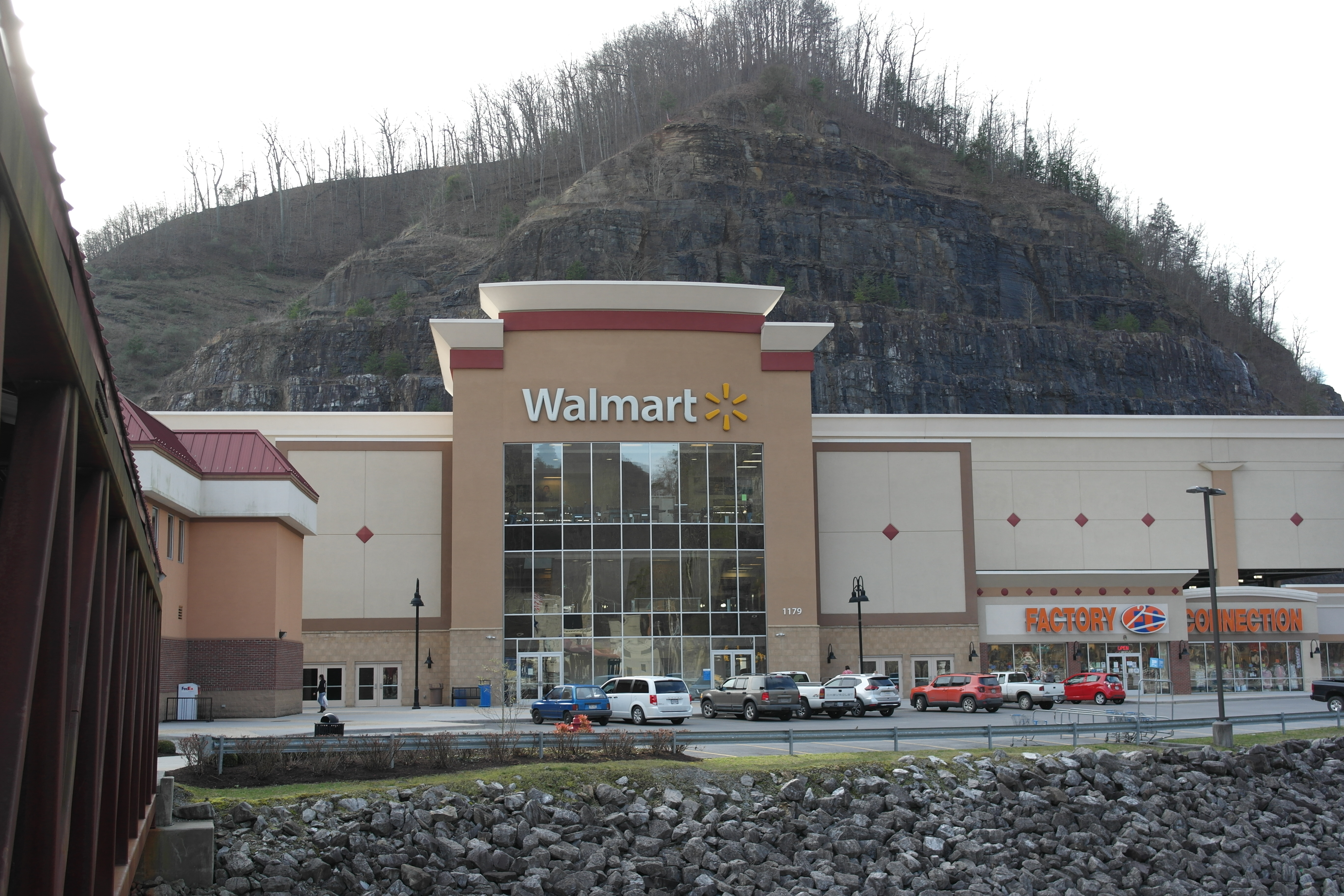
Walmart in Grundy

Grundy was the home of the predecessor to the Food City Stores, when Jack Smith opened a Piggly Wiggly franchise in 1955. The store was Smith's first and the chain has now grown to 150 stores, primarily located in Virginia, Kentucky, Tennessee Georgia and Alabama. The chain is known for sponsoring the Food City 500 NASCAR race at Bristol Motor Speedway. The Grundy store remained open one day short of 50 years. It closed in November 2005. A new store opened up just outside the town limits in Vansant. The Grundy store was re-opened on June 29, 2011, as one of the KVAT Food City Stores. It is a Super Dollar Foods Center location.

=== Education as a new sustaining industry ===
Grundy is home to the Appalachian School of Law, which opened in 1997, and the Appalachian College of Pharmacy, which opened in 2005. Buchanan County chose Grundy as the site for the ASL to revitalize the town, which had been in a steady economic decline since the Flood of 1977. The ASL has generated $12 million for the local economy. Its presence has increased demand for construction of rental homes and stimulated the opening of additional businesses in the area. Additionally, ASL has successfully demonstrated the concept of creating institutions of higher education as an economic development tool.

This success contributed to the founding of the Appalachian College of Pharmacy, located in Oakwood. Like the Appalachian School of Law, it was created as part of a continuing economic redevelopment effort in the region. ACP is forecast to add $20 million per year to the local economy.

=== Appalachian School of Law shooting ===
On January 16, 2002, Dean Anthony Sutin, Professor Thomas Blackwell and 1L student Angela Dales were shot and killed on the campus of the Appalachian School of Law by student Peter Odighizuwa, 43, of Nigeria. Odighizuwa was found to be mentally competent at his trial. He pleaded guilty to the murders to avoid the death penalty, and was sentenced to multiple life terms in prison.

== Geography ==
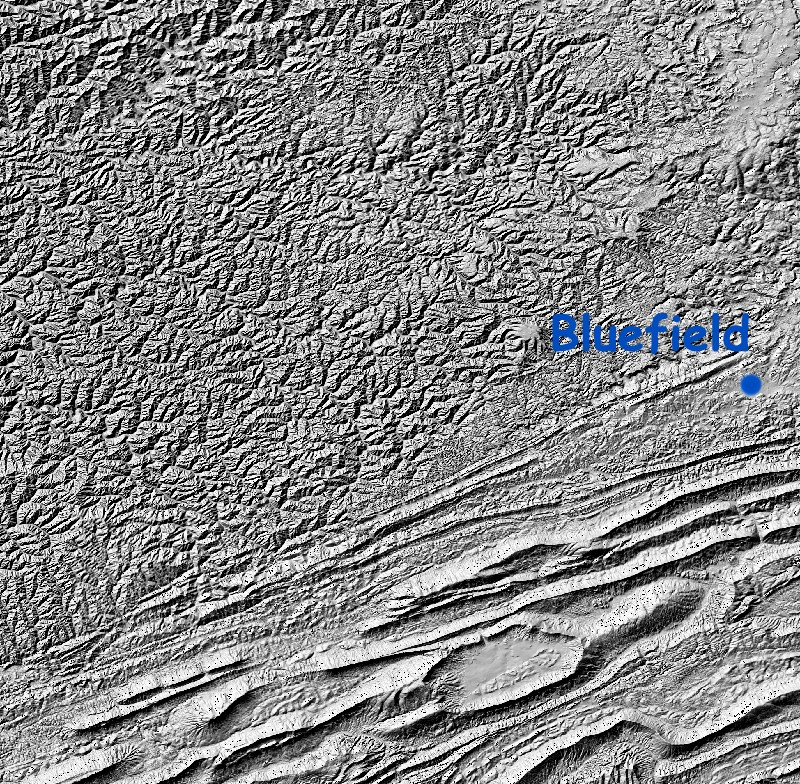
Grundy is located in the Cumberland Mountains portion of the Appalachian range, just east of the Cumberland Plateau. The town is located towards the center left portion of the map.

Grundy is located at 37°16′40.40″N 82°05′56.48″W (37.2778886, -82.0990223). The town is located at intersection of U.S. Route 460 and State Route 83, directly on the banks of the Levisa Fork River. Grundy is located in the coalfields of the Appalachian Mountains.

According to the United States Census Bureau, the town has a total area of 5.040 square miles (13.05 km^{2}), of which 4.986 square miles (12.91 km^{2}) is land and 0.054 square miles (0.14 km^{2}) is water.

Grundy is located in the Cumberland Plateau Region.

=== Transportation ===
Grundy is served by the Grundy Municipal Airport located in Vansant, which serves general aviation traffic. Commercial traffic can be found at Beckley Raleigh County Memorial Airport in West Virginia and at the Tri-Cities Regional Airport in Tennessee.

Four County Transit maintains a local trolley system that services downtown locations. Stops include the Grundy courthouse, Grundy Church of Christ, the former Food City parking lot, the Grundy Community Center, the Appalachian School of Law, and the former downtown parking lot.

The Norfolk Southern Railway maintains tracks and runs trains through the town. However, there are no passenger rail services or stops currently in Grundy.

Grundy is served by U.S. Route 460. The Coalfields Expressway will be built just to the north and east of town. State Route 83 is also a major highway in the area.

== Demographics ==
Historical population
| Census | Pop. | Note | %± |
|---|---|---|---|
| 1880 | 123 | | — |
| 1900 | 200 | | — |
| 1910 | 264 | | 32.0% |
| 1920 | 394 | | 49.2% |
| 1930 | 815 | | 106.9% |
| 1940 | 1,476 | | 81.1% |
| 1950 | 1,947 | | 31.9% |
| 1960 | 2,287 | | 17.5% |
| 1970 | 2,054 | | −10.2% |
| 1980 | 1,699 | | −17.3% |
| 1990 | 1,305 | | −23.2% |
| 2000 | 1,105 | | −15.3% |
| 2010 | 1,021 | | −7.6% |
| 2020 | 875 | | −14.3% |
| 2025 (est.) | 815 | ▼ | −6.9% |
U.S. Decennial Census; 2020 Census

Age distribution of Buchanan County, Virginia

=== 2020 census ===
As of the 2020 census, there were 875 people, 326 households, 186 families residing in the town.

=== 2010 census ===
As of the 2010 census, there were 1,021 people, 392 households, _ families residing in the town.

=== 2000 census ===
As of the 2000 census, there were 1,105 people, 405 households, and 249 families residing in the town. The population density was 219.3 people per square mile (84.7/km^{2}). There were 519 housing units at an average density of 103.0 per square mile (39.8/km^{2}). The racial makeup of the town was 79.19% White, 17.92% African American, 0.45% Asian, 0.09% Pacific Islander, 1.81% from other races, and 0.54% from two or more races. Hispanic or Latino of any race were 2.81% of the population.

There were 405 households, out of which 22.2% had children under the age of 18 living with them, 51.9% were married couples living together, 7.7% had a female householder with no husband present, and 38.3% were non-families. 36.3% of all households were made up of individuals, and 17.5% had someone living alone who was 65 years of age or older. The average household size was 2.28 and the average family size was 2.72.

In the town, the population was spread out, with 32.2% under the age of 18, 7.1% from 18 to 24, 21.4% from 25 to 44, 22.6% from 45 to 64, and 16.7% who were 65 years of age or older. The median age was 37 years. For every 100 females, there were 89.9 males. For every 100 females aged 18 and over, there were 92.5 males.

The median income for a household in the town was $37,411, and the median income for a family was $47,143. Males had a median income of $40,236 compared to $24,821 for females. The per capita income for the town was $19,531. About 10.5% of families and 17.3% of the population were below the poverty line, including 12.8% of those under the age of 18 and 14.0% of those age 65 or over.

== Education ==
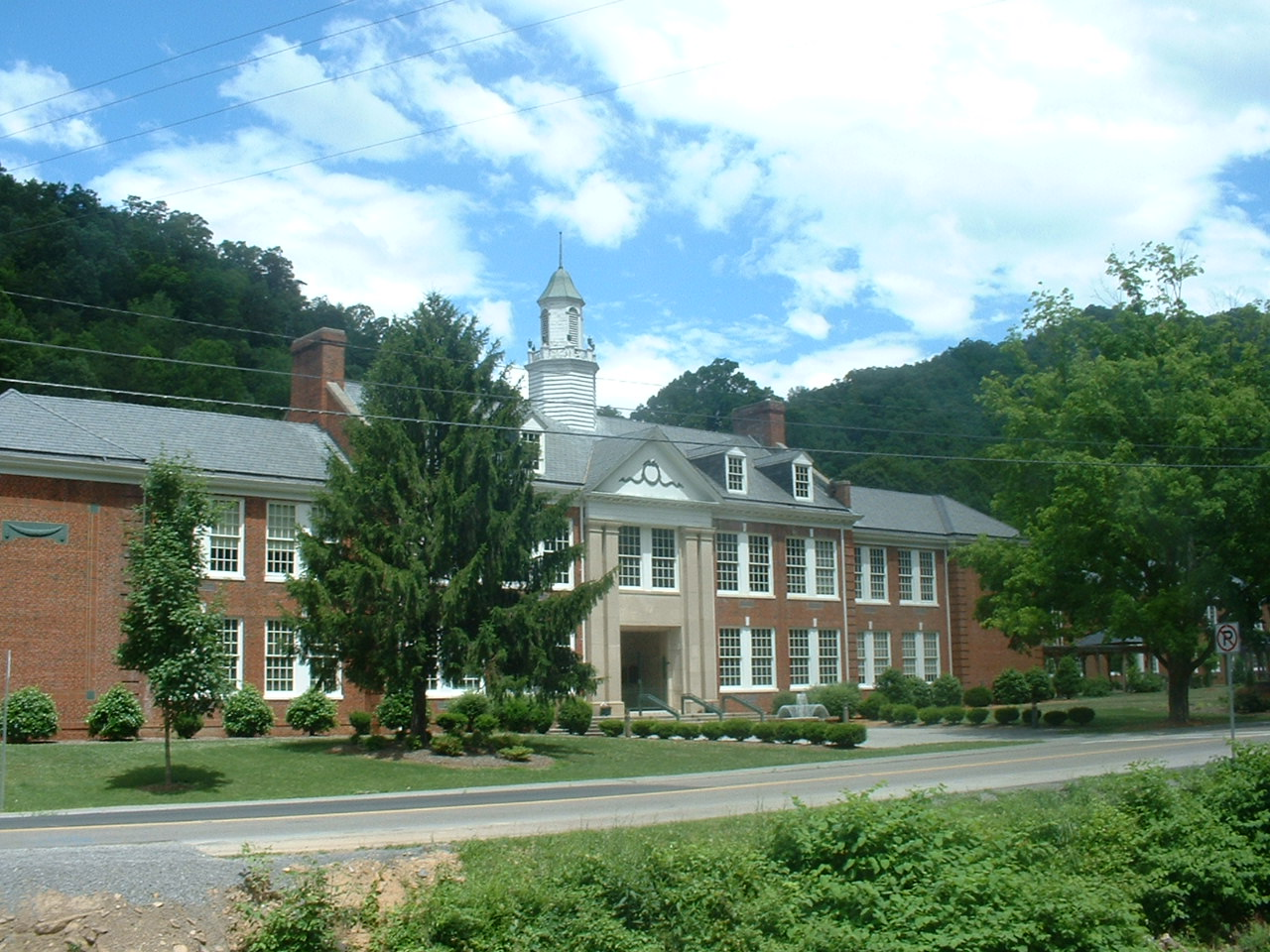
The Appalachian School of Law is located in Grundy. The school opened its doors to students in 1997.

Grundy is home to several public schools, including several elementary schools and one, consolidated high school that began taking students in 2026 for all students in the county. In addition to its public education facilities, Grundy also hosts a private Christian academy, Mountain Mission School, which also provides boarding and care for children in need from infancy onward.

Regarding higher learning, Grundy proper is also the home of one professional institution: the Appalachian School of Law.

=== Public Schools ===
- Southern Gap High School
- Riverview Elementary/Middle School
- Twin Valley Elementary Middle School
- Hurley Elementary Middle School
- Council Elementary School
- Buchanan County Career, Technology & Higher Learning Center

=== Private Schools ===
- Mountain Mission School

=== Post-Secondary Education ===
- Appalachian School of Law

== Notable people ==
- Heath Calhoun – U.S. Paralympian, spokesperson for Wounded Warrior Project
- Roger Keith Coleman – convicted of murder-rape of sister-in-law and cause célèbre; executed in 1992. He was the second man in the US to have post-execution analysis of DNA; in 2006 this conclusively proved that he was guilty.
- Jayma Mays – actress
- Ryan O'Quinn – actor, writer
- Bev Perdue – Former Governor of North Carolina
- Francis Gary Powers - Lived in Grundy for a time and graduated from Grundy High School
- Lee Smith – writer
- Steven C. Smith - President & CEO of Food City
- Vernon C. Smith (1892–1963) – member of the Virginia House of Delegates
- Mel Street – country music singer

== Climate ==
The climate in this area is characterized by hot, humid summers and mild to cool winters. According to the Köppen Climate Classification system, Grundy has a humid subtropical climate, abbreviated "Cfa" on climate maps. The Trewartha climate classification is temperate oceanic due to five months of winter chill (monthly means below 10 °C (50 °F)), abbreviated "Do" on climate maps.

Climate data for Grundy, Virginia (1991–2020 normals, extremes 1960–present)
| Month | Jan | Feb | Mar | Apr | May | Jun | Jul | Aug | Sep | Oct | Nov | Dec | Year |
|---|---|---|---|---|---|---|---|---|---|---|---|---|---|
| Record high °F (°C) | 78 (26) | 83 (28) | 89 (32) | 94 (34) | 98 (37) | 100 (38) | 101 (38) | 100 (38) | 102 (39) | 93 (34) | 85 (29) | 80 (27) | 102 (39) |
| Mean daily maximum °F (°C) | 42.9 (6.1) | 47.1 (8.4) | 55.8 (13.2) | 67.1 (19.5) | 73.8 (23.2) | 79.8 (26.6) | 82.6 (28.1) | 81.6 (27.6) | 77.1 (25.1) | 67.4 (19.7) | 56.2 (13.4) | 46.0 (7.8) | 64.8 (18.2) |
| Daily mean °F (°C) | 33.7 (0.9) | 36.9 (2.7) | 43.8 (6.6) | 53.6 (12.0) | 62.0 (16.7) | 69.3 (20.7) | 72.9 (22.7) | 72.1 (22.3) | 66.6 (19.2) | 55.5 (13.1) | 44.3 (6.8) | 36.9 (2.7) | 54.0 (12.2) |
| Mean daily minimum °F (°C) | 24.4 (−4.2) | 26.6 (−3.0) | 31.8 (−0.1) | 40.1 (4.5) | 50.1 (10.1) | 58.8 (14.9) | 63.3 (17.4) | 62.5 (16.9) | 56.1 (13.4) | 43.6 (6.4) | 32.5 (0.3) | 27.9 (−2.3) | 43.1 (6.2) |
| Record low °F (°C) | −14 (−26) | −17 (−27) | −3 (−19) | 21 (−6) | 25 (−4) | 40 (4) | 40 (4) | 45 (7) | 30 (−1) | 19 (−7) | 9 (−13) | −11 (−24) | −17 (−27) |
| Average precipitation inches (mm) | 3.31 (84) | 3.28 (83) | 4.03 (102) | 4.30 (109) | 4.81 (122) | 4.76 (121) | 5.69 (145) | 4.19 (106) | 3.16 (80) | 3.02 (77) | 2.61 (66) | 3.70 (94) | 46.86 (1,190) |
| Average snowfall inches (cm) | 6.2 (16) | 4.2 (11) | 2.6 (6.6) | 0.2 (0.51) | 0.0 (0.0) | 0.0 (0.0) | 0.0 (0.0) | 0.0 (0.0) | 0.0 (0.0) | 0.0 (0.0) | 0.4 (1.0) | 2.4 (6.1) | 16.0 (41) |
| Average precipitation days (≥ 0.01 in) | 13.1 | 11.9 | 13.1 | 12.8 | 14.1 | 13.9 | 13.2 | 11.3 | 9.3 | 9.9 | 9.6 | 13.1 | 145.3 |
| Average snowy days (≥ 0.1 in) | 5.0 | 3.8 | 2.3 | 0.2 | 0.0 | 0.0 | 0.0 | 0.0 | 0.0 | 0.0 | 0.6 | 3.0 | 14.9 |
Source: NOAA

== See also ==
- The Virginia Mountaineer
