= Final Theory (novel) =

2008 science fiction novel by Mark Alpert

Final Theory: A Novel
- Author: Mark Alpert
- Original title: Final Theory: A Novel
- Language: English
- Genre: Science fiction, Techno-thriller
- Publisher: Touchstone
- Publication date: June 3, 2008
- Publication place: United States
- Media type: Print (Paperback, Hardcover)
- Pages: 368 pp
- ISBN: 1-4165-7287-2 (first edition, hardcover)

Final Theory is a 2008 techno-thriller novel written by Scientific American contributing editor Mark Alpert and published by Touchstone Books. The novel fictitiously posits that Albert Einstein actually achieved his life's ambition of discovering a unified field theory. If he had been successful in developing this theory, it would have large consequences for the world, including the development of a weapon of mass destruction. Final Theory is Alpert's debut novel.

== Plot ==
The narrative begins with a brutal attack on the aged theoretical physicist Hans Walther Kleinman. Kleinman is rushed to the hospital and summons his former student David Swift, now a professor at Columbia University. Just before dying, Kleinman pulls Swift close and wheezes two words in German: "Einheitliche Feldtheorie" and a sequence of numbers. It is revealed that the German phrase refers to the unified field theory developed by Einstein during his later years. Swift is intimidated by Lucille Parker, a sixtyish FBI Agent who is also after the theory.

Swift meets with his old friend Monique Reynolds, a string theorist at Princeton University. Swift learns of the deaths of two close students of Einstein. The sequence of numbers points to The Robotics Institute at Carnegie Mellon University where another close student of Einstein, Amil Gupta, worked.

At CMU they meet Gupta. Knowing that the FBI has been following them, they head for a hunting cabin in West Virginia, where Kleinman spent some time a few years ago. They are followed by FBI Agent Brock and by Simon, the assassin who killed Kleinman. Simon soon arrives and takes the weak Gupta and Brock. It is revealed that Simon is in fact working for Gupta.

Swift's company escapes and meets with Gupta's daughter, Elizabeth Gupta. She tells them that Kleinman worked for a while at Fort Benning. At Fort Benning, they search for the theory in a combat training simulation called Warfighter. They escape into the mountains nearby, with the theory saved to a flash drive.

In reading the contents of the flash drive, Swift and Reynolds discover why Einstein concealed his discovery: the theory, if put into practice, can trigger a violent warping of the local spacetime, leading to release of huge amounts of energy which can be used as a weapon. They destroy the flash drive before discovering that Gupta's son Michael, who has autism, has memorized the whole theory. The FBI soon arrives and they escape. Monique is caught by Gupta and Simon and they are all taken to Fermilab, where Gupta plans to use the Tevatron to create a particle beam and put the theory into action. Brock is left with David, Monique, Karen and Jonah. In a fight between David and Brock, Brock falls into burning mineral oil and dies.

It is revealed that Simon's wife and children were murdered by the US troops and he intends to use the technology against the United States as revenge. He locks Gupta in a room and takes control of the experiment. David shuts down the Tevatron by smashing the beam pipe and in the process kills Simon. Gupta becomes hysterical and kills people near him with an Uzi. The FBI agents kill Gupta. Michael is left to the custody of Monique, who gets engaged to David.

== Characters ==
- David Swift : A professor of the History of Science at Columbia University.
- Monique Reynolds: A string theorist at Princeton University and friend of Swift.
- Amil Gupta/Henry Cobb: A close student of Einstein and chief antagonist of the story.
- Hans Kleinman: A close student of Einstein and Swift's former mentor.
- Michael: Gupta's autistic grandson.
- Simon: The assassin and shtarker employed by Gupta.
- Elizabeth Gupta: Gupta's daughter.
- Karen: ex-wife of Swift.
- Jonah: son of Swift.
- Agent Brock: FBI Agent who also works for Gupta.
- Lucille Parker: FBI Agent in charge.

== Reception ==
The novel received mixed reviews. Janet Maslin of The New York Times criticized the novel by saying "Though its dialogue sometimes name-drops quarks and geons, nobody in "Final Theory" sounds so smart once the running begins ... And the book's scientific expertise is eventually neutralized by that blunt, overall style". The Sunday Times spoke of the book as "an entertaining, if fairly predictable, chase, laced with murder and mayhem...a lightspeed read with not too much mass". Douglas Preston described the book as "One of the finest science-based thrillers to appear in a long time".

== See also ==
- Theory of everything
- Grand Unified Theory
