= Pound River =

Coordinates: 37.24289°N 82.32126°W

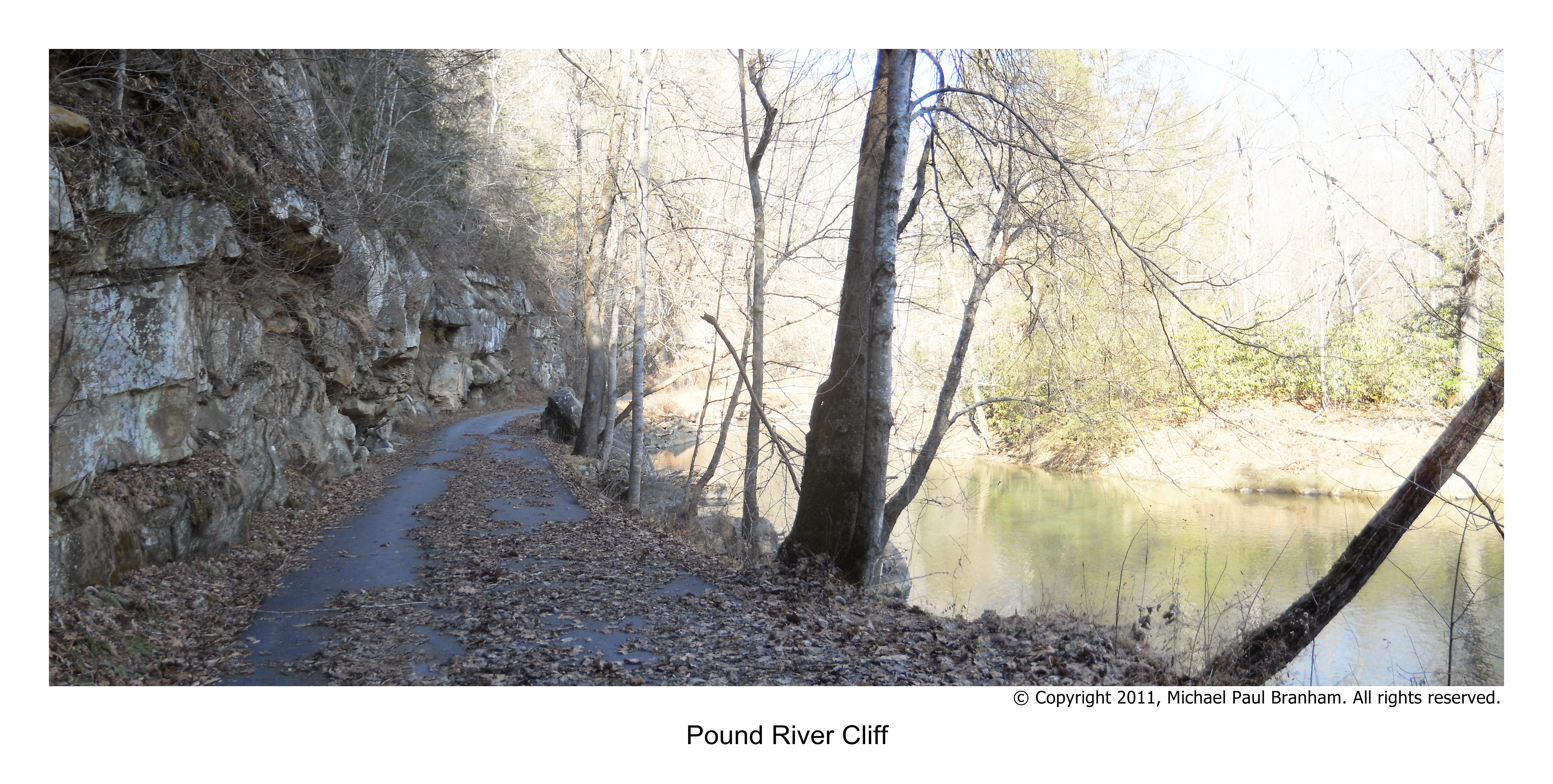
A section of Pound River in Dickenson County VA. Above Pound River Campground

The Pound River is a river in the U.S. state of Virginia, running through part of Wise County and through Dickenson County. Its North and South forks join in the town of Pound and flow northeast into the reservoir impounded by the John W. Flannagan Dam, where it is joined by the waters of the Cranes Nest River. About a mile and a half downstream from the dam the Pound flows into the Russell Fork of the Big Sandy River, which flows into the Ohio River.

A section of the Pound River below Pound Virginia has been designated as a Virginia Scenic River.

== See also ==
- List of rivers of Virginia
- Pound River Recreational Area

== Additional References ==
- U.S. Geological Survey Geographic Names Information System: Pound River
- USGS Hydrologic Unit Map - State of Virginia (1974)
- Salmon, Emily J.; Edward D. C. Campbell, Jr., eds. (1994). The Hornbook of Virginia History (4th ed.). Richmond, VA: Virginia Office of Graphic Communications. ISBN 0-88490-177-7.
