= Appalachian School of Law =

Private law school in Grundy, Virginia, US

- Seal of the school
- Motto: Ex petra veritatis justitia exsurgit
- Established: 1994
- School type: Private law school
- Dean: David Western
- Location: Grundy, Virginia, United States; 37°16′40″N 82°05′47″W
- Enrollment: 182
- USNWR ranking: 175-194
- Bar pass rate: 71.4% (July 2025 Virginia bar first-time takers)
- Website: www.asl.edu
- ABA profile: ABA Profile

The Appalachian School of Law (ASL) is a private law school in Grundy, Virginia. It is accredited by the American Bar Association and offers a three-year Juris Doctor degree to approximately 128 full-time students. The school was founded in 1994 and admitted its first class of students in August 1997. ASL was started and brought to Buchanan County, Virginia, as a tool of economic development for the region. ASL emphasizes professional responsibility and alternative dispute resolution in its curriculum.

== History ==
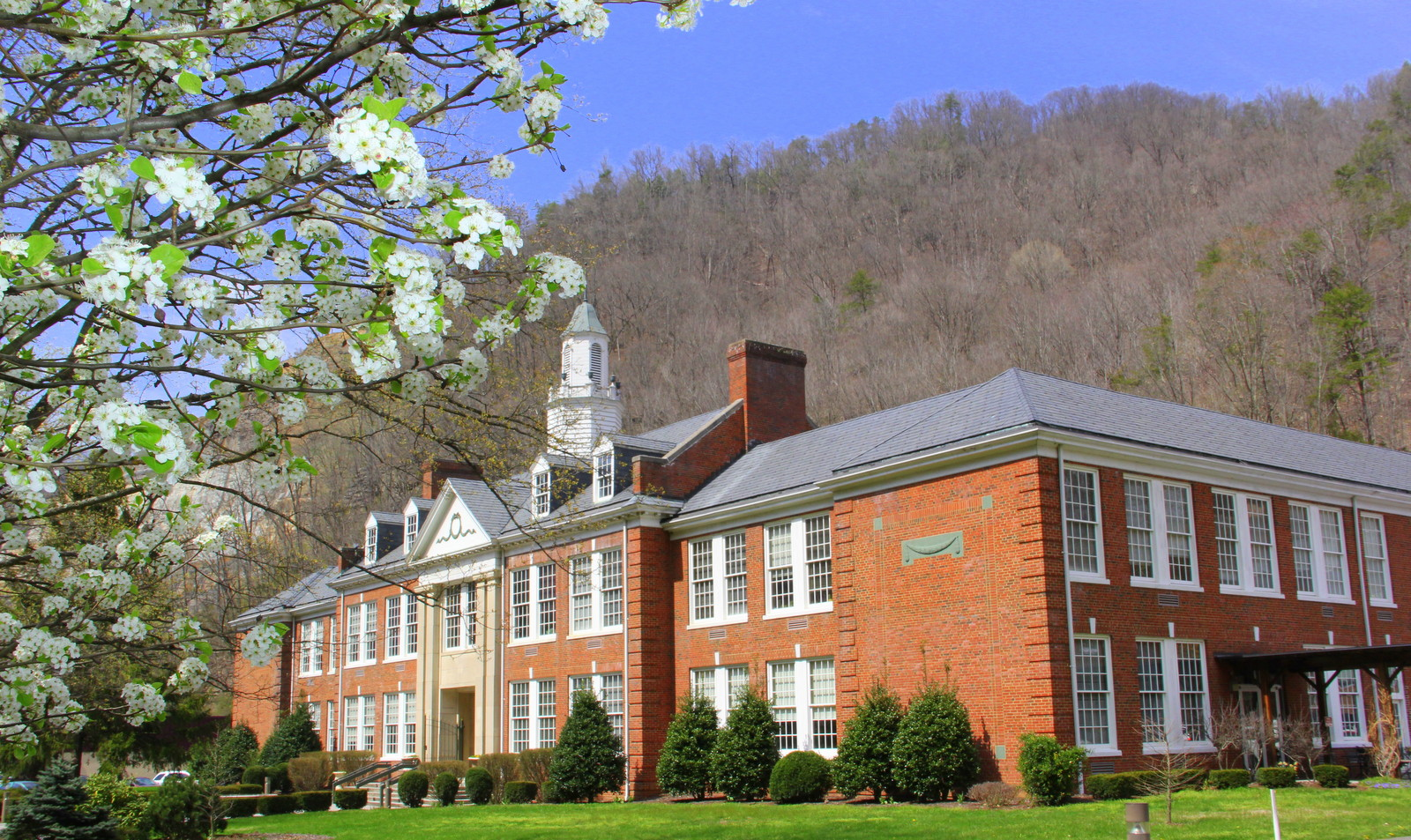
Academic building

ASL traces its roots back to 1993 when Norton, Virginia lawyer Joe Wolfe came up with the idea to create a law school in Central Appalachia. His idea was well received by local business leaders and a steering committee was founded in 1994 and grew to eighty members. The committee surveyed lawyers and found that legal education needed to emphasize professional responsibility and alternative dispute resolution as these pillars of law school were becoming more important in today's law practice. The committee gained permission from the Virginia General Assembly to start a law school in 1995 and continued to secure endorsements from local civic associations and industrial development authorities. Buchanan County, Virginia approached the committee in 1996 and offered the grounds and buildings of the former P.V. Dennis Elementary and Grundy Jr. High Schools to which the steering committee accepted.

The motto of the school, Ex petra veritatis justitia exsurgit, in English translates as, From the rock of truth, justice arises.

A $1 million loan (which was later converted into a grant) financed the buildings' renovations.

The State Council of Higher Education in Virginia granted the school the ability to enroll students studying for the Juris Doctor Degree in 1997. The charter class of 71 students first attended classes on August 12, 1997.

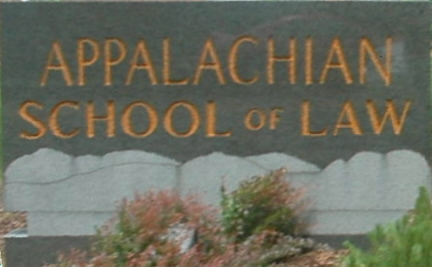
Sign at the entrance to the school

Buchanan County brought ASL to Grundy in order to revitalize a town that had been in a steady economic decline since the town's flood of 1977. ASL has brought a positive economic impact on its home town, including spurring construction of rental homes and the opening of additional businesses in the area. ASL has become a success story for the concept of higher education as an economic development tool. The school has brought in $12 million per year to the local economy. ASL's economic success spurred the conception and implementation of the Appalachian College of Pharmacy (formerly University of Appalachia College of Pharmacy), which was founded in 2003 and opened its doors in 2005.

=== 2002 mass shooting ===
On January 16, 2002, ASL Dean Anthony Sutin, Professor Thomas Blackwell, and first-year student Angela Dales were shot and killed by disgruntled student Peter Odighizuwa, 43, of Nigeria. When Odighizuwa exited the building, he was subdued by two students armed with personal firearms. At his trial, Odighizuwa was found mentally competent, pleaded guilty to the murders, and was sentenced to multiple life terms in prison.

== Employment ==
According to ASL's official 2025 ABA-required disclosures, 53% of the Class of 2025 obtained full-time, long-term, JD-required employment nine months after graduation.

ABA Employment Summary for 2025 Graduates
Employment Status	Percentage
Employed - Bar Passage Required	58.1%
Employed - J.D. Advantage	14.0%
Employed - Non-Professional Position	2.3%
Unemployed - Not Seeking	7.0%
Unemployed - Seeking	9.3%
Employment Status Unknown	7.0%
Total of 43 Graduates

== Profile ==
According to the schools' required 2025 disclosures, ASL's student body demographic was as follows: 65% White, 11% African American, 10% Hispanic, 8% Asian American, 3% Native American, and 3% unknown or not reporting. For the fall 2024 entering class, 732 applied for admission, of which 446 (61%) were granted admission and 88 (20% of those accepted) matriculated into the first year class. The 25-75 percentile range for LSAT scores and undergraduate GPA were 145-151 and 2.72-3.53. Of the Appalachian graduates taking the Virginia bar for the first time in July 2025, 71% passed, vs. an 85% average rate.

The student body size declined from 332 total students in 2011 to 96 in 2016, before rebounding to 128 in 2017 and 182 in 2024.

Appalachian School of Law was granted full accreditation by the American Bar Association in 2006. In 2017, Appalachian School of Law was one of several law schools sanctioned by the American Bar Association due to lax admissions standards and other defects. Three years later, the Council of the Section on Legal Accreditation lifted the sanctions, stating that the school had demonstrated compliance with accreditation standards.

== Campus ==
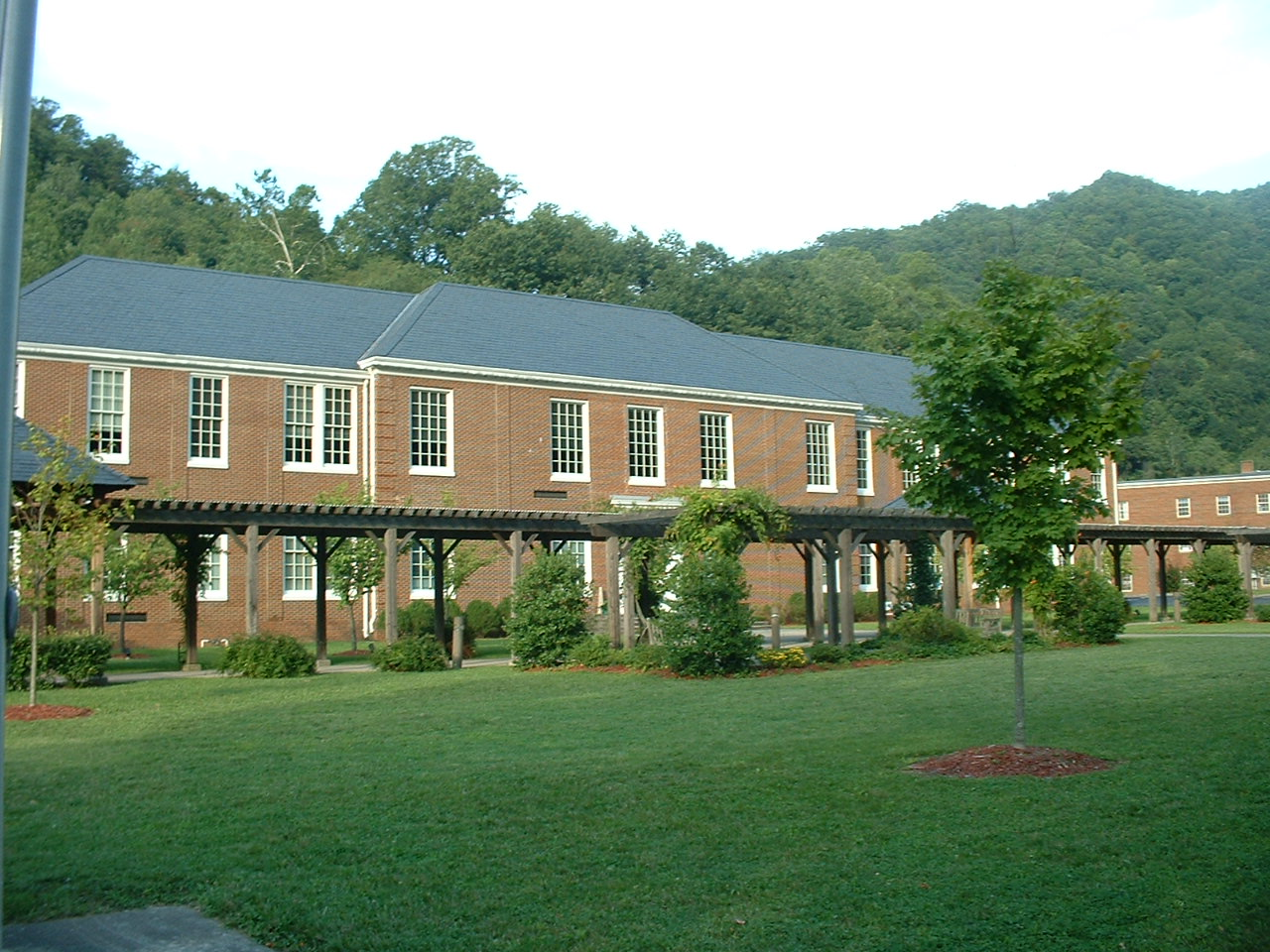
The Law Library, 2008

The ASL campus consists of three buildings, the main academic building, the Booth Center and the law library. The law school also uses the Booth Hall reception room as a classroom, as the Southwest Virginia Community College occupies all the classrooms.

The main academic building was created from the town's former high school (and junior high school) and gymnasium complex; these buildings were joined and extensively remodeled and expanded as part of a $1 million award-winning architectural project. The main building contains an appellate courtroom (which doubles as the auditorium for large events), a trial courtroom, five seminar rooms, student mailroom, the Lion's Lounge, and faculty and staff offices. Most rooms are wired for internet access. The two-story law library is adjacent to the main building. The building has 24,780 square feet (2,302 m^{2}) and has facilities for seminar classes and group study rooms. The library contains almost 227,000 volumes. Once the former Grundy Elementary School, this building has also been extensively remodeled and features individual and group study areas, a computer lab, and both wireless and wired internet access.

A third campus building, Booth Hall, was opened in 2008. Booth Hall is situated behind and to the rear of the main academic building and law library. The building has 58,000 square feet (5,400 m^{2}) of space on three floors. Thirty three parking spaces are situated on the first floor. Additional classrooms, including one that seats 150 students, computer lab, student lounges, and a conference room are included in the building. The building houses the school's Business Office and President's Office. The building also houses facilities for Southwest Virginia Community College, which shares classroom space with ASL.

== Academic program ==
Students at Appalachian complete the traditional law school curriculum as required by the American Bar Association (ABA); however, the school distinguishes itself from almost all of the other 192 ABA accredited law schools in the country, as its students are required to spend 25 hours each semester on community service projects, ranging from dispute resolution training to humane society management. Only 11 other law schools have similar mandatory programs.

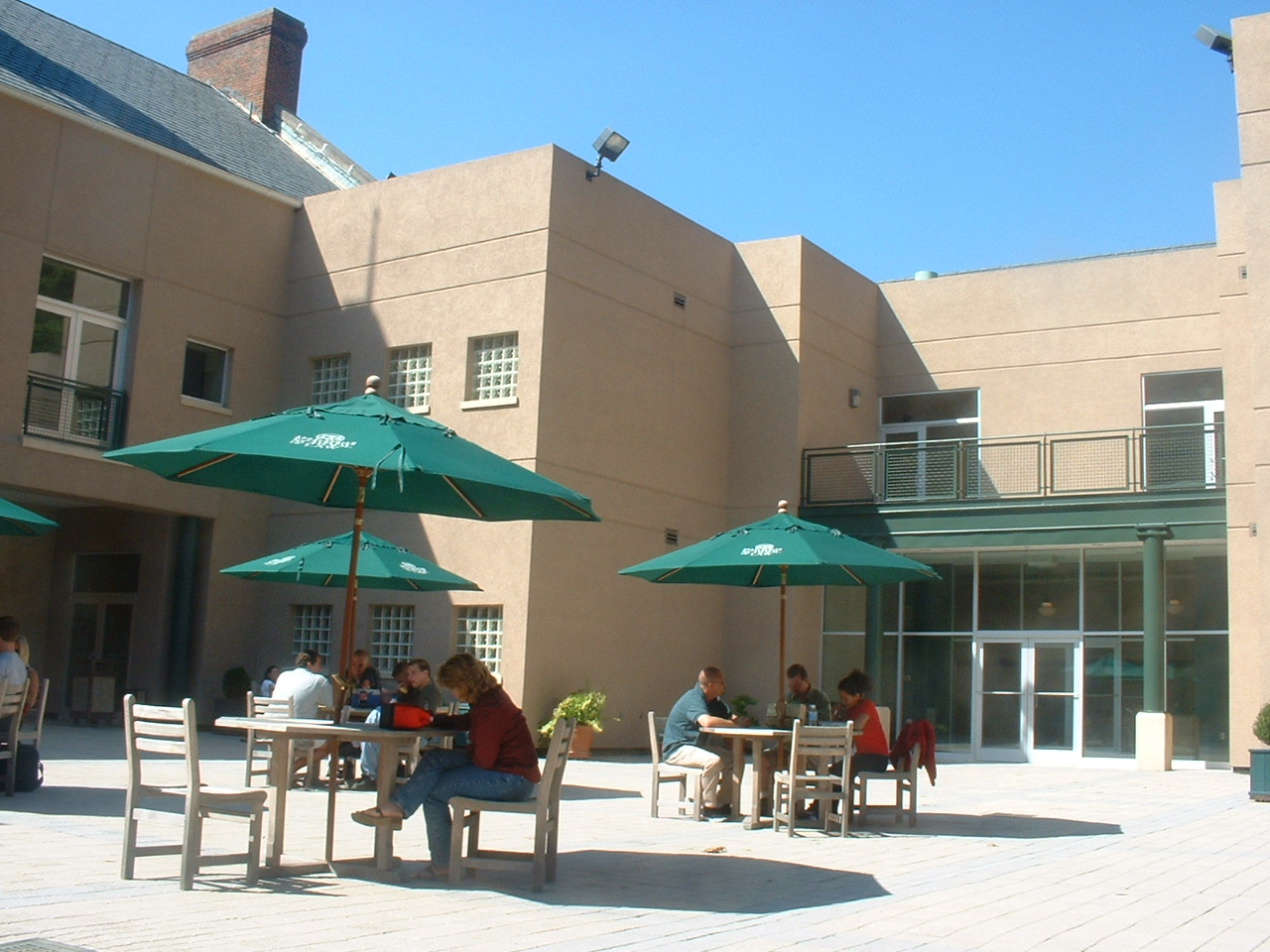
The Atrium, c. 2002

ASL offers a Pre-Admission Summer Opportunity (PASO) programs for students who have the potential to become good lawyers and law students but whose LSAT's and GPA's do not necessarily reflect their skills and talents. The program lasts four weeks, three of which are independent home study, the final week is the on-campus lecture and final exam. The top scorers on the final exam may be offered admission to the fall's first year class.

First year students arrive one week before the academic year starts to partake in a one credit course called Introduction to Law which covers the basic skills needed in order to succeed in law school. Students also register for classes and finalize their financial aid needs then.

First year students cover legal foundation courses: Torts (4 credits), Contracts (6 credits), Property (6 credits), Civil Procedure (5 credits), Criminal Law (3 credits) and Legal Process (6 credits). Legal Process teaches students legal research and writing. First-year students also take an orientation course to the community service program in the first semester and an additional legal research course in the second semester. First-year students may not take any electives. Additionally, all first-year students are required to complete a 200-hour unpaid externship over the summer before their second-year. This requirement is usually met by students working as judicial clerks, interns in prosecutor and defense offices, state and federal governmental agencies, and private practices. Placements have included state supreme courts, the Environmental Protection Agency, and the United States Department of Justice. The school provides assistance in locating and obtaining these positions. Second year students cover additional legal foundation courses: Constitutional Law (6 credits), Evidence (4 credits), Professional Responsibility (3 credits), and Criminal Procedure (3 credits). Students also cover Trusts and Estates (4 credits) and Business Associations (4 credits), and are allowed to take electives, such as Appellate Advocacy. Students also fulfill their alternative dispute resolution requirement in the second year.

Students in their third year have the most options when it comes to electives. Third year students are required to take Family Law (3 credits), Secured transactions (3 credits), Payment Systems (3 credits), and a Practicum (4 credits), which include: Trial Advocacy, Criminal Practice, Estate Planning, Pre-Trial Practice, Real Estate Transactions, Insurance Law, or Employment Law. Additionally, students have their capstone experience in a writing-intensive seminar. Each student takes two practicums focusing on the practical aspects of legal practice.

The school publishes the Appalachian Journal of Law.

=== Alternative dispute resolution ===
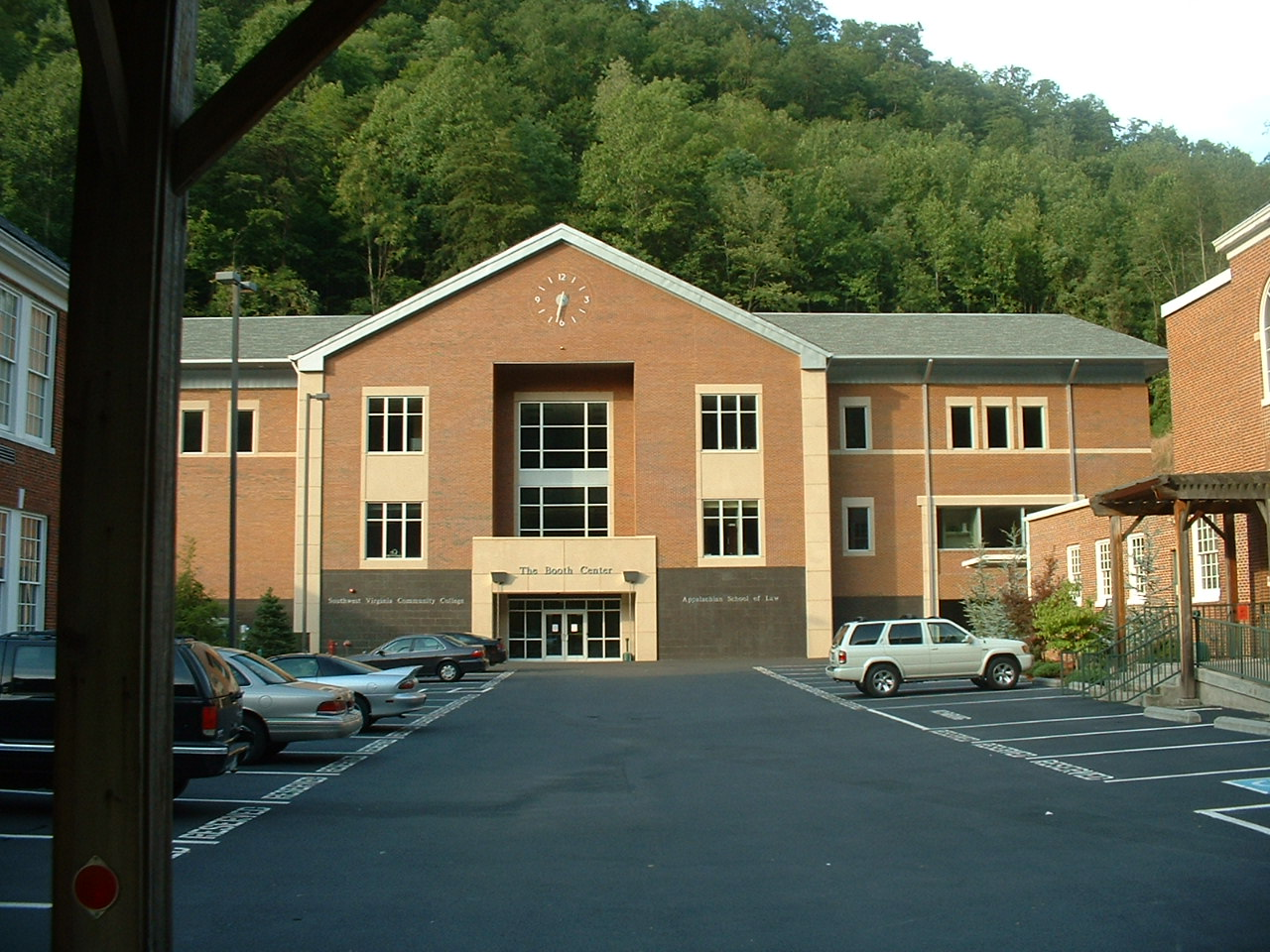
Booth Center, 2008

ASL is distinguished by its requirement that all second-year students complete a mandatory Alternative Dispute Resolution (ADR) class. The school has also held ADR training in local schools; this program drew national attention, particularly from former U.S. Attorney General Janet Reno, who has publicly congratulated the school on this effort. Students are given an overview of different types of conflict resolutions, particularly mediation, negotiation, and arbitration. Ethical issues are explored in addition to legal and policy ramifications. Students learn the strengths and weaknesses of each method of dispute resolution and learn which methods are appropriate for certain situations. Students also have the option of taking additional courses in their second and third years to earn certification for mediation under the "Lawyer as a Problem Solver" Certificate Program. Students must complete basic law school procedure courses, two ADR focused courses, and an additional problem solving skills course. ASL offers two courses to fulfill this requirement: certified civil mediation, and advanced negotiation. The school has two faculty members who solely teach alternative dispute resolution related courses.

== Student life ==
ASL has an active student body involved in activities not only on campus but within the local community and the legal profession as well.

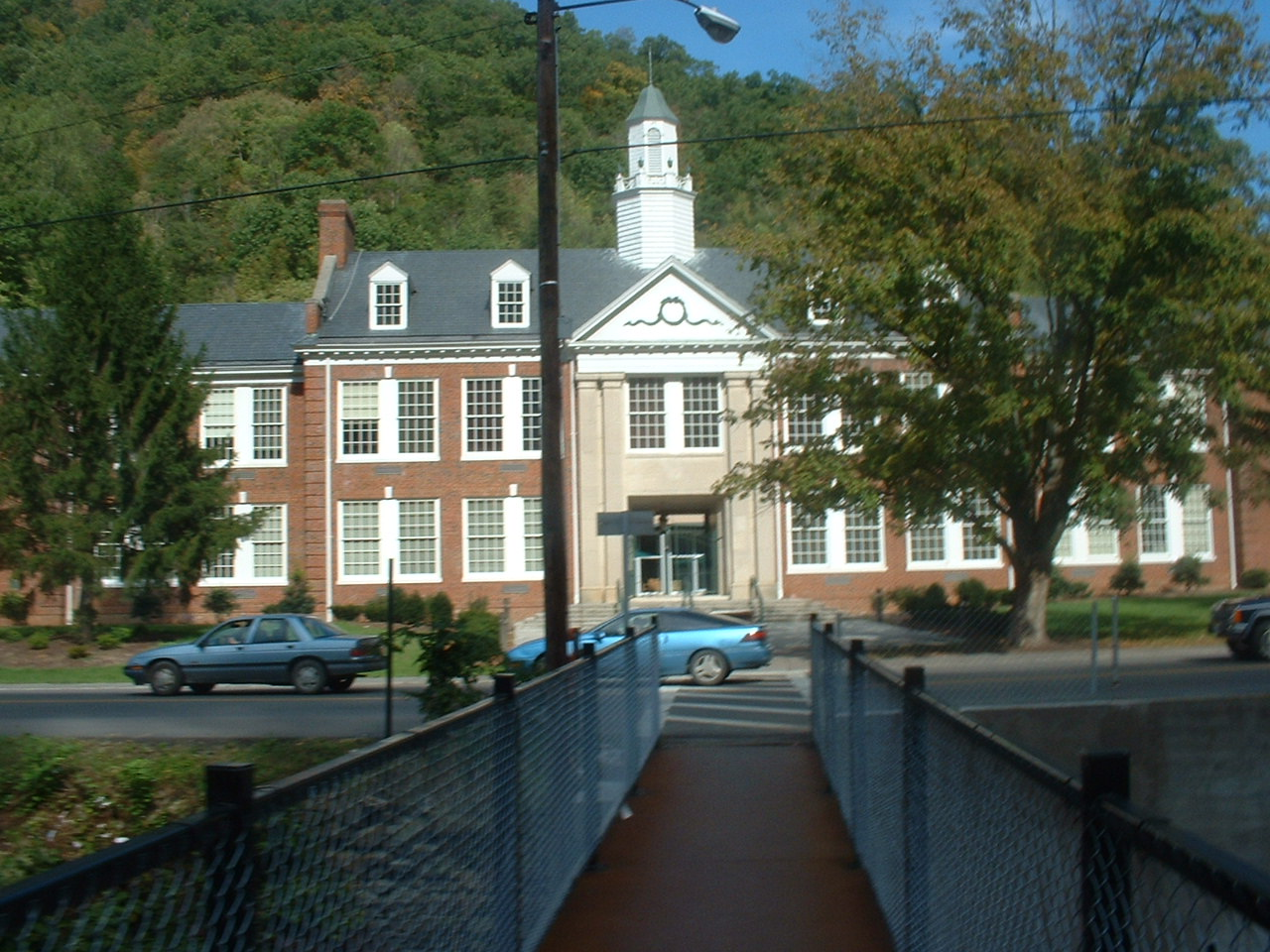
View of main academic building from the footbridge above Slate Creek

Officially recognized student organizations on campus:

- American Bar Association - Law Student Division
- American Constitution Society
- American Trial Lawyers Association
- Association of Women in Law
- Black Law Students Association
- Christian Legal Society
- Criminal Law Society
- Democratic Society
- Energy and Mineral Law Society
- Federalist Society
- Gay and Straight Legal Alliance
- Libertarian Society
- Phi Alpha Delta
- Phi Delta Phi
- Republican Law Students Association
- Sports and Entertainment Law Society
- Sutin Public Interest Association

ASL's student body governs itself through the Student Bar Association. The SBA is divided into three branches, the Senate, Executive, and the Honor Court. The Senate consists of three elected senators for the first year, second year, and third year classes. The Executive Branch consists of the Student Body President, Vice President, Secretary, and Treasurer, plus any committees that the President appoints to assist in his or her endeavors. The Honor Court consists of six elected judges, two for the first year class and two per upper class.

ASL also fields moot court teams that compete in national competitions. Students can audition for the team through an annual intra-school tournament that is composed of the Appellate Advocacy class in fall of the second year.
