= Virginia State Route 63 =

State highway in western Virginia, US

State Route 63

Route information
- Maintained by VDOT
- Length: 39.28 mi (63.22 km)
- Existed: 1958–present
- Tourist routes: Virginia Byway

Major junctions
- South end: US 58 Alt. in St. Paul
- SR 83 in Clinchco
- North end: SR 80 / SR 83 in Haysi

Location
- Country: United States
- State: Virginia
- Counties: Wise, Russell, Dickenson

Highway system
- Virginia Routes; Interstate; US; Primary; Secondary; Byways; History; HOT lanes
← SR 62	→ I-64

State Route 63 (SR 63) is a primary state highway in the U.S. state of Virginia. The state highway runs 39.28 miles (63.22 km) from U.S. Route 58 Alternate (US 58 Alternate) in St. Paul north to SR 80 and SR 83 in Haysi.

== Route description ==
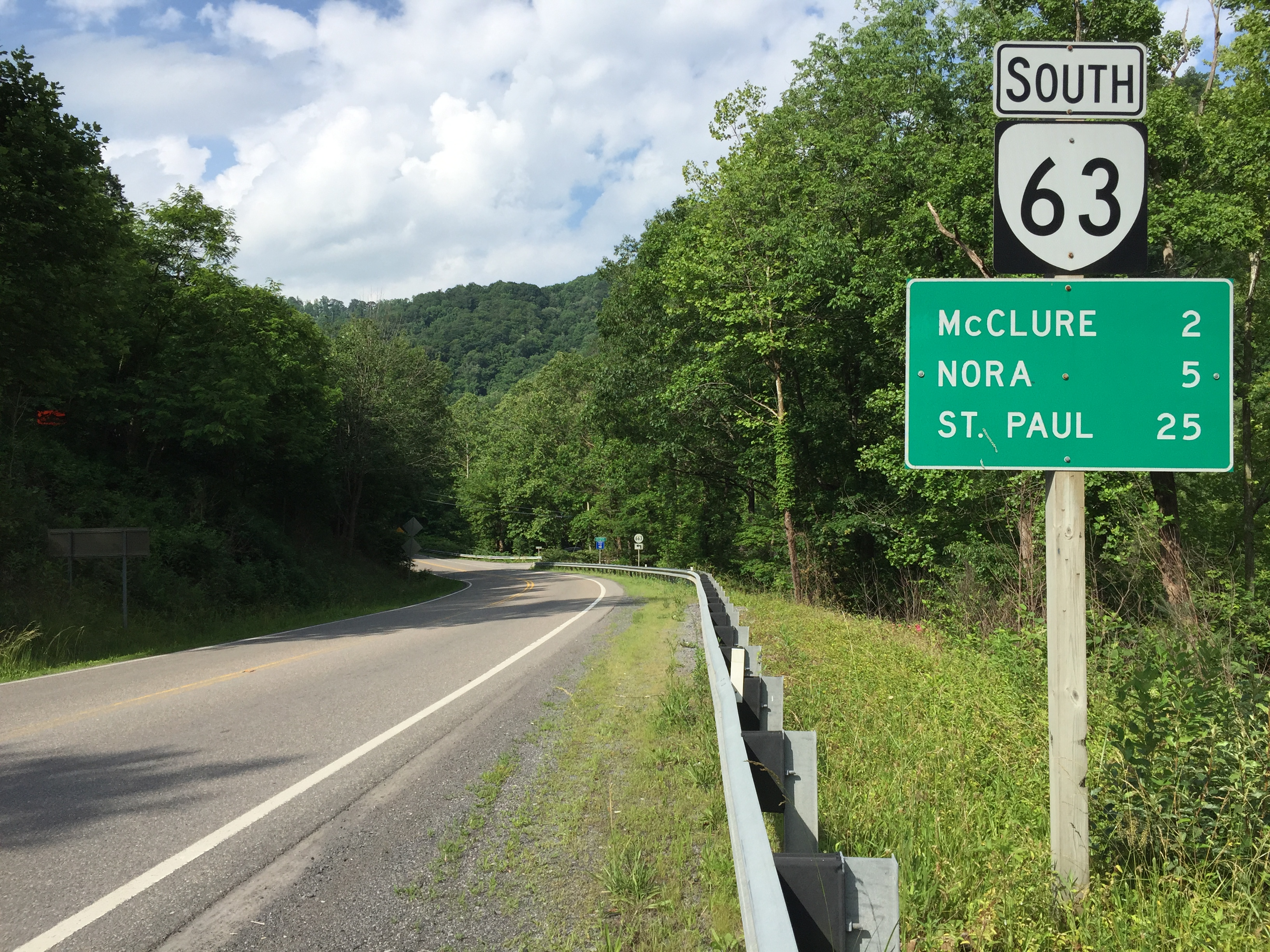
View south along SR 63 at SR 83 in Fremont

SR 63 begins at an intersection with US 58 Alternate (Bull Run Road) in the town of St. Paul. The state highway heads east through town as Wise Street, which passes under Norfolk Southern Railway's Clinch Valley District. The highway intersects SR 270 (4th Street) in the center of town. SR 63 parallels the Clinch River and CSX's Kingsport Subdivision, formerly the Clinchfield Railroad, east to Lick Creek. The highway and railroad turn north to follow Lick Creek out of St. Paul and cross the Wise–Russell county line. The state highway heads north as Dante Road to Dante, where the rail line diverges to pass through the Sandy Ridge Tunnel. SR 63 crosses Sandy Ridge and the Tennessee Valley Divide at Flint Gap and enters Dickenson County. SR 63 descends as Dante Mountain Road into the valley of McClure Creek and rejoins the Kingsport Subdivision at Trammel. The state highway heads northwest through the village of Nora, where McClure Creek merges with Open Fork to become the McClure River.

SR 63 begins to run concurrently with SR 83 (Dickenson Highway) at Fremont; SR 83 heads west toward Clintwood, the county seat of Dickenson County. The two highways diverge after passing through the town of Clinchco. SR 83 and the railroad continue to follow the river to Haysi while SR 63 turns onto Big Ridge Road. The state highway ascends and has a winding path atop Big Ridge. SR 63 leaves the ridge to descend to the town of Haysi. The state highway passes over the Kingsport Subdivision at the south end of the railroad's short tunnel and crosses Russell Fork of the Big Sandy River just north of its confluence with the McClure River. SR 63 turns east and becomes the town's Main Street before the highway reaches its northern terminus in the center of town at its three-way intersection with SR 80 and SR 83, which follow Main Street east and Sandlick Drive south to cross Russell Prater Fork at its confluence with Russell Fork.

== Major intersections ==
County	Location	mi	km	Destinations	Notes
Russell	St. Paul	0.00	0.00	US 58 Alt. (Bull Run Road) – Norton, Abingdon	Southern terminus
Wise	St. Paul			SR 270 south (4th Avenue)	Northern terminus of SR 270
Russell	No major junctions				
Dickenson	Fremont	24.33	39.16	SR 83 west (Dickenson Highway) – Clintwood	Southern end of SR 83 concurrency
Dickenson	Clinchco	29.27	47.11	SR 83 east (Dickenson Highway) – Haysi, Breaks Interstate Park, Grundy	Northern end of SR 83 concurrency
Dickenson	Haysi	39.28	63.22	SR 80 / SR 83 (Dickenson Highway) – Breaks Interstate Park, Grundy, Honaker	Northern terminus
1.000 mi = 1.609 km; 1.000 km = 0.621 mi: Concurrency terminus

< SR 112	Spurs of SR 11; 1923–1928	SR 114 >
< SR 122	District 1 State Routes; 1928–1933	SR 124 >
