= Kingsport Subdivision =

Railway line in Kentucky, Virginia, and Tennessee

The Kingsport Subdivision (also KP Subdivision) is a 133.2-mile (214.4 km) railroad line owned and operated by CSX Transportation in the U.S. states of Kentucky, Virginia, and Tennessee. It was formerly part of the Huntington West Division. It became part of the CSX Florence Division on June 20, 2016. Running from Elkhorn City, Kentucky, south to Erwin, Tennessee, it forms the north half of the former Clinchfield Railroad; the south half, from Erwin to Spartanburg, South Carolina, is now the Blue Ridge Subdivision. From Elkhorn City, the line continues north as the Big Sandy Subdivision to Catlettsburg, Kentucky, on the Ohio River; trains can then continue to Ohio and other Midwest points. From Spartanburg, trains can continue to Georgia, Florida, or other Southeast states.

== Route description ==
The line begins at Elkhorn City, Kentucky, at the south end of the Big Sandy Subdivision. It continues southeast alongside the Russell Fork of the Big Sandy River through Breaks Interstate Park to Haysi, Virginia. The line uses the valley of the McClure River from Haysi to Nora and McClure Creek from Nora to Trammel. Between Trammel and Dante, the line crosses under the Sandy Ridge (Tennessee Valley Divide) using the Sandy Ridge Tunnel.

At Dante, the line follows Lick Creek southerly to St. Paul, where it interchanges with the Norfolk Southern Railway (NS) Clinch Valley Division. Then it heads southwesterly along the Clinch River to Speers Ferry, heading south through Clinch Mountain in the Clinch Mountain Tunnel to Kermit. From Kermit east-southeasterly to the Tennessee state line, the railroad generally heads cross-country and alongside small creeks, most notably Possum Creek.

After crossing into Tennessee, the line crosses the NS Appalachia Division at Frisco. This junction allows CSX trains to use NS trackage rights to reach their Cumberland Valley Subdivision at Big Stone Gap, Virginia and NS trains to use CSX trackage between Frisco and St. Paul. The Kingsport Subdivision continues southeast from Frisco, picking up the valley of the North Fork Holston River and then the South Fork Holston River into downtown Kingsport. The line continues generally southeasterly through the South Fork valley, but also cross-country, to Johnson City. Then it heads south-southeast to Okolona and south-southwesterly near Buffalo Creek to Unicoi and North Indian Creek to its end at Erwin, where the Blue Ridge Subdivision continues.

On October 15, 2015 CSX Transportation announced it was closing the Erwin yard facility, with a loss of 300 jobs. All through traffic trains would cease using the Clinchfield Route, a.k.a. Kingsport Subdivision. Industries around Kingsport and Johnson City, TN would still be serviced by trains coming North from Spartanburg, SC and Bostic, NC, as would the Alpha Natural Resources (now part of Contura Energy) coal preparation facility in McClure, VA by trains coming south from Shelbiana, Ky. Norfolk Southern would still use the line from St. Paul to Frisco, VA via a trackage rights arrangement with the CSX. The line between St. Paul and McClure (19.4 miles) would be idled immediately, effectively ending the use of the Kingsport Subdivision as a functioning bridge route between Spartanburg and Elkhorn City. It has been reported, however, that there have been instances of equipment running between Shelbiana, Ky and Dante, Va.

The line officially retains its mothballed status as of Spring 2017, even though several through freights have used the line in recent weeks running from Shelbiana, KY to Kingsport, TN and points south. The "Santa Claus Special," a decades-long CSX-Clinchfield Railroad tradition of distributing toys, candy and gifts to the residents along the line during the Christmas season, continues to this day from Shelbiana and Elkhorn City to the yard at Kingsport. The ""Santa Claus Train" normally runs the Saturday before Thanksgiving every year.
