= Clinchco, Virginia =

- Town
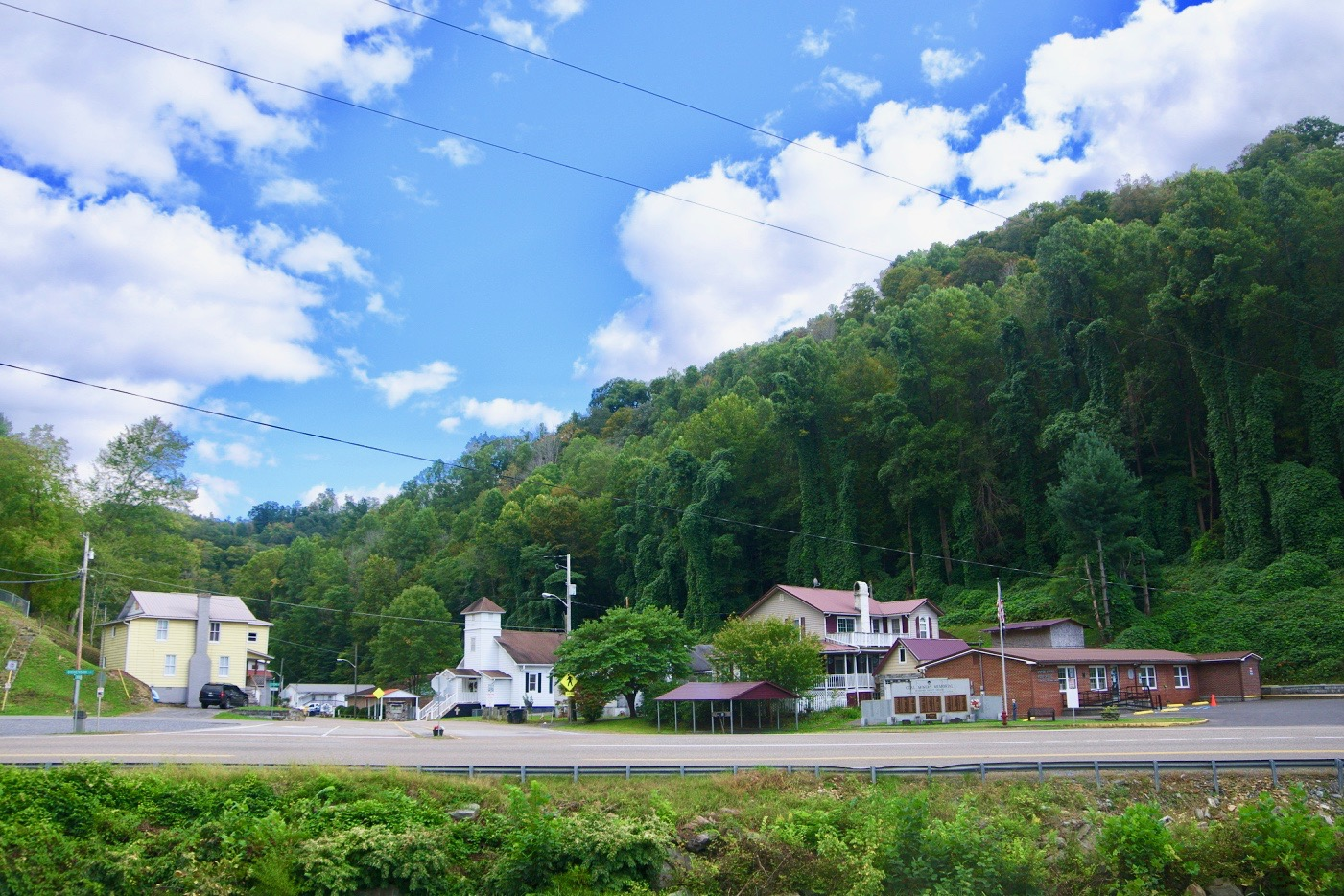
- Clinchco

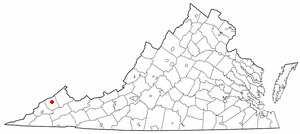
- Location of Clinchco, Virginia
- Coordinates: 37°9′45″N 82°21′36″W
- Country: United States
- State: Virginia
- County: Dickenson

Area
  - Total: 2.83 sq mi (7.32 km^{2})
  - Land: 2.79 sq mi (7.23 km^{2})
  - Water: 0.031 sq mi (0.08 km^{2})
- Elevation: 1,398 ft (426 m)

Population (2020)
  - Total: 244
  - Estimate (2019): 294
  - Density: 105.3/sq mi (40.64/km^{2})
- Time zone: UTC−5 (Eastern (EST))
  - Summer (DST): UTC−4 (EDT)
- ZIP code: 24226
- Area code: 276
- FIPS code: 51-17504
- GNIS feature ID: 1502782
- Website: https://clinchcova.net/

Clinchco is a town in Dickenson County, Virginia, in the United States. The town, formerly known as Moss, was named for both the Clinchfield Railroad and the Clinchfield Coal Corporation. As of the 2020 census, Clinchco had a population of 244. The Clinchco post office was established in 1917.

== Geography ==
Clinchco is located in north-central Dickenson County at 37°9′45″N 82°21′36″W (37.162466, −82.359951). The town is situated in the valley of the McClure River, a northeast-flowing tributary of the Russell Fork, part of the Levisa Fork/Big Sandy River system leading north to the Ohio River. Virginia State Routes 63 and 83 run through the center of town. VA 83 leads northeast (downriver) 7 miles (11 km) to Haysi, while VA 63 follows a ridge route that takes 10 miles (16 km) to reach Haysi. The two highways run south (upriver) together 5 miles (8 km) to Fremont. St. Paul is 29 miles (47 km) south of Clinchco via VA 63, and Pound is 20 miles (32 km) west via VA 83.

According to the United States Census Bureau, Clinchco has a total area of 2.84 square miles (7.35 km^{2}), of which 2.80 square miles (7.26 km^{2}) is land and 0.03 square miles (0.08 km^{2}), or 1.15%, is water.

== Demographics ==
Historical population
Census	Pop.	Note	%±
2000	424		—
2010	337		−20.5%
2020	244		−27.6%
2025 (est.)	227	▼	−7.0%
U.S. Decennial Census

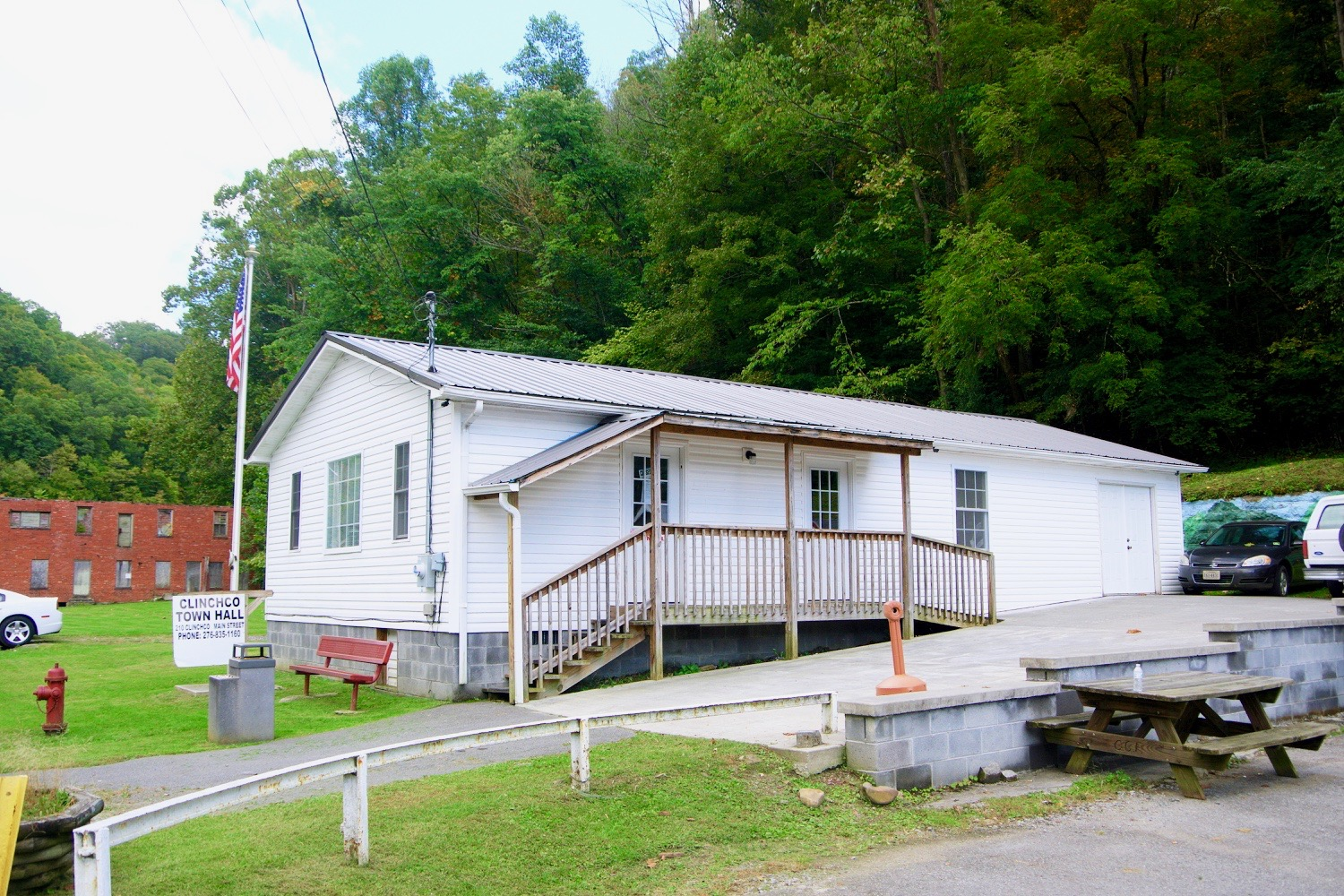
Clinchco Town Hall

At the 2000 census, there were 424 people, 189 households, and 113 families in the town. The population density was 153.8 people per square mile (59.3/km^{2}). There were 226 housing units at an average density of 82.0 per square mile (31.6/km^{2}). The racial makeup of the town was 90.57% White, 8.96% African American, 0.24% from other races, and 0.24% from two or more races. Hispanic or Latino of any race were 1.42%.

Of the 189 households, 30.2% had children under the age of 18 living with them; 45.5% were married couples living together; 10.6% had a female householder with no husband present; and 39.7% were non-families. Of all households, 37.0% were one person, and 18.0% were one person aged 65 or older. The average household size was 2.24, and the average family size was 3.00.

The age distribution was 23.6% under the age of 18, 7.1% from 18 to 24, 26.9% from 25 to 44, 25.7% from 45 to 64, and 16.7% aged 65 or older. The median age was 39 years. For every 100 females, there were 86.0 males. For every 100 females aged 18 and over, there were 86.2 males.

The median household income was $18,393, and the median family income was $23,750. Males had a median income of $30,313, versus $19,688 for females. The per capita income for the town was $12,257. About 26.0% of families and 30.1% of the population were below the poverty line, including 40.0% of those under age 18 and 23.6% of those aged 65 or older.

== Notable person ==
- Darrell "Shifty" Powers, World War II (D-Day) veteran, Company E ("Easy Company"), 506th Parachute Infantry Regiment, U.S. 101st Airborne Division (portrayed in the HBO miniseries Band of Brothers). Powers described his hometown thus:

"Picture a bunch of mountains all grouped together with narrow, winding roads lacing through them. Clinchco's a little speck by the side of one of those roads, far in the southwest tip of the triangle of Virginia."

== Climate ==
The climate in this area is characterized by relatively high temperatures and evenly distributed precipitation throughout the year. The Köppen Climate System describes the weather as humid subtropical and uses the abbreviation Cfa.
