= Dante, Virginia =

- Census-designated place
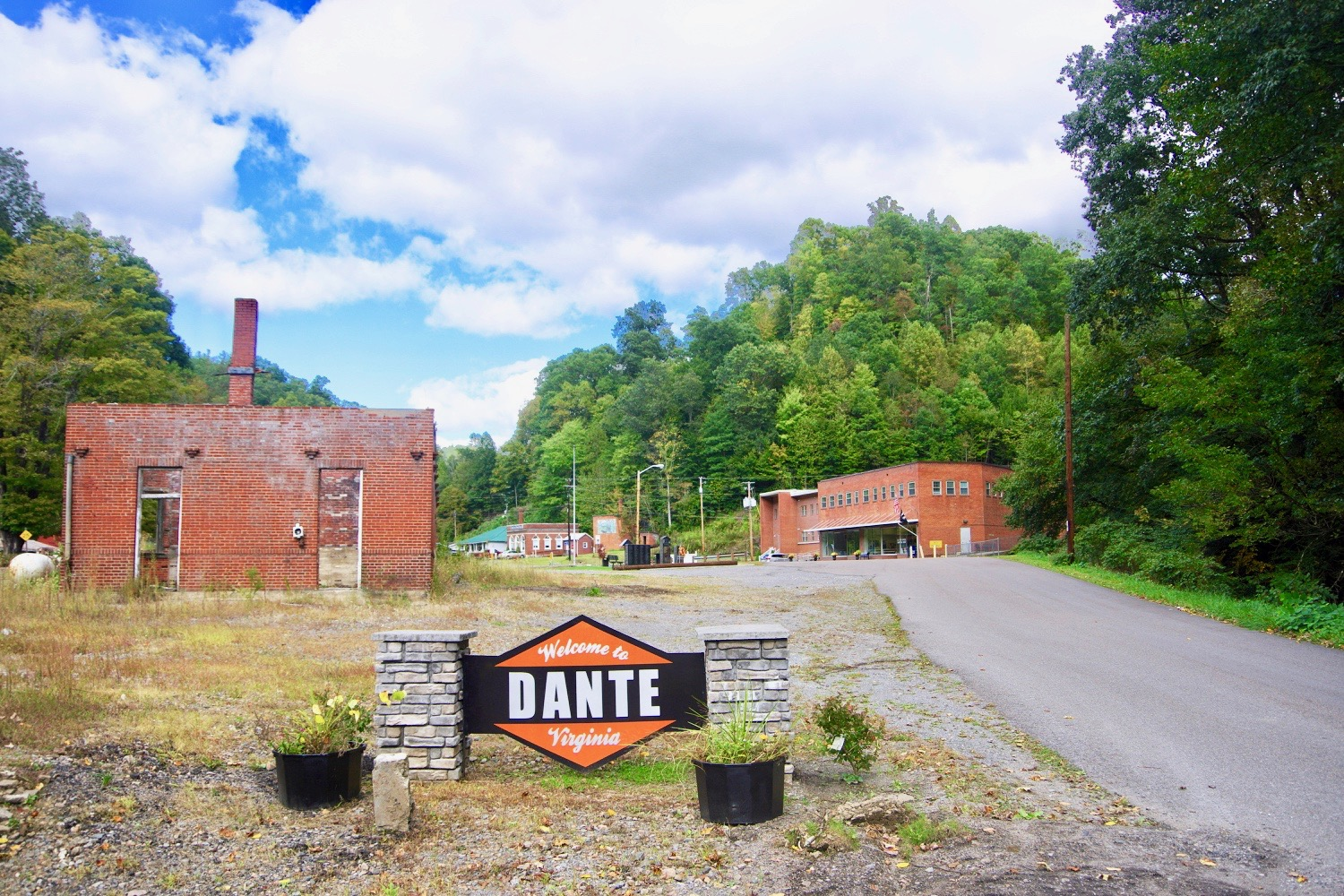
- Welcome sign along Bunch Town Road

- Location within the Commonwealth of Virginia
- Coordinates: 36°58′44″N 82°17′29″W
- Country: United States
- State: Virginia
- County: Russell

Area
  - Total: 7.02 sq mi (18.17 km^{2})
  - Land: 7.01 sq mi (18.15 km^{2})
  - Water: 0.0077 sq mi (0.02 km^{2})
- Elevation: 1,765 ft (538 m)

Population (2010)
  - Total: 649
  - Density: 93/sq mi (35.8/km^{2})
- Time zone: UTC−5 (Eastern (EST))
  - Summer (DST): UTC−4 (EDT)
- ZIP code: 24237
- FIPS code: 51-21312
- GNIS feature ID: 2630763
- Website: http://danteva.org/

Dante is a census-designated place in Russell and Dickenson counties, Virginia, United States. As of the 2020 census, Dante had a population of 572.

== History ==
Dante (rhymed with "paint", sometimes rhymed with "pant", but never rhymed with "Dante Alighieri") was originally called "Turkeyfoot" due to the confluence of hollows. It was originally settled in the late 1700s and early 1800s by western frontiersmen.

Explosive growth occurred in the early 1900s with the discovery and exploitation of numerous bituminous coal seams. Southern industrialist George L. Carter made it the northern terminus of the Clinchfield Railroad and the headquarters of the Clinchfield Coal Company, which began to mine the nearby hollows (mainly Bear Wallow and Straight Hollow) during the early part of the 20th century. As a result, immigrants from Germany, Hungary, Greece, Poland and other central European countries flocked to the area. In 1912, the construction of the Sandy Ridge Tunnel just north of Dante allowed the Clinchfield Railroad to extend all the way to Elkhorn City, Kentucky. The coal seams surrounding the community were largely exhausted by the mid-1960s and were closed in favor of new mines such as Moss #3 (A, B, C and D mines) in Duty, Virginia.

Dante was mostly a decaying coal town until 2016, when a renewed interest from its residents prompted community organizations to begin discussions on a path to revitalization. This plan has included reestablishment of a general store and redevelopment of the many abandoned Clinchfield Railroad grades and mine tramways into ATV trails. CSX Transportation terminated rail crew operations at Dante Yard in 2015, and the Clinchfield Coal Company offices are now apartments.

== Revitalization ==
In early 2016 the Dante Community Association was formed with citizens of Dante and representatives from Russell County. The goal of the organization is to promote the revitalization of Dante and the surrounding area by investing in infrastructure, economic development, and the community at large, they are currently in the process of applying for a planning grant.

== Geography ==
Dante is located in northwestern Russell County. The Dante CDP extends west into Dickenson County to include the settlement of West Dante. The communities are located in the valley of Lick Creek, which flows south to the Clinch River at St. Paul, and is thus part of the Tennessee River watershed. Sandy Ridge, overlooking Dante to the north, lies along the Tennessee Valley Divide, with waters on the opposite side flowing north via the McClure River to the Russell Fork/Levisa Fork/Big Sandy River system, reaching the Ohio River near Huntington, West Virginia.

Dante is 7.5 miles (12.1 km) north of St. Paul and 21 miles (34 km) south of Clinchco via Virginia State Route 63.

== Demographics ==
Historical population
Census	Pop.	Note	%±
1950	2,405		—
1960	1,436		−40.3%
1970	1,153		−19.7%
1980	1,083		−6.1%
2010	649		—
2020	572		−11.9%
U.S. Decennial Census; 1940 1950 1960 1970; 1980 1990 2000 2010

Dante was first listed as an unincorprated community in the 1950 U.S. census; and as a census designated place in the 1980 U.S. census. The CDP was deleted prior to the 1990 U.S. census and reappeared as a CDP in the 2010 U.S. census.

== Climate ==
The climate in this area is characterized by hot, humid summers and generally mild to cool winters. According to the Köppen Climate Classification system, Dante has a humid subtropical climate, abbreviated "Cfa" on climate maps.
