= McClure, Virginia =

Unincorporated community in Virginia, United States

- Unincorporated community
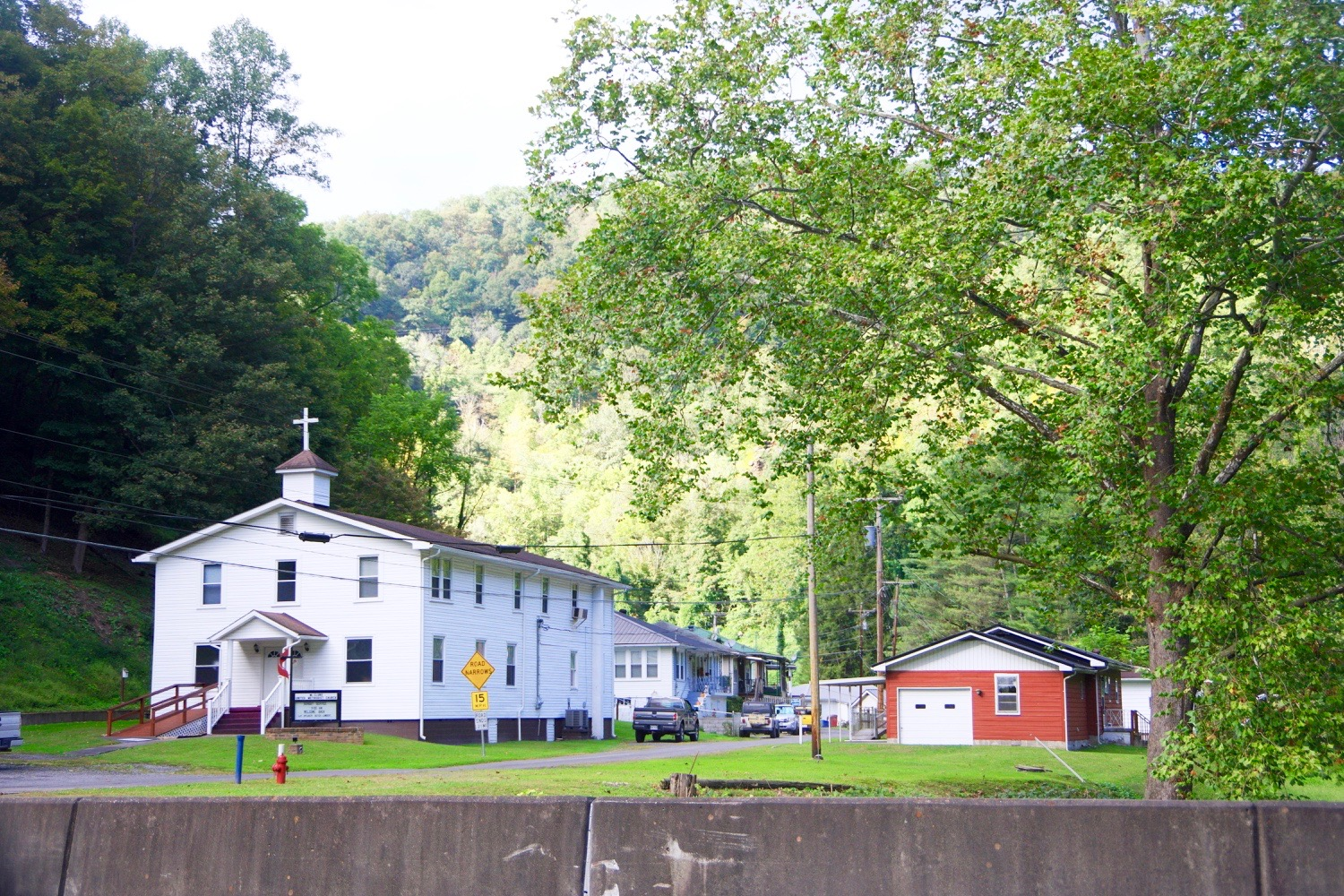
- McClure in 2020

- Location within Virginia Location within the United States
- Coordinates: 37°06′09″N 82°22′35″W
- Country: United States
- State: Virginia
- County: Dickenson
- Elevation: 1,476 ft (450 m)
- Time zone: UTC-5 (Eastern (EST))
  - Summer (DST): UTC-4 (EDT)
- ZIP code: 24269
- Area code: 276
- GNIS feature ID: 1493267

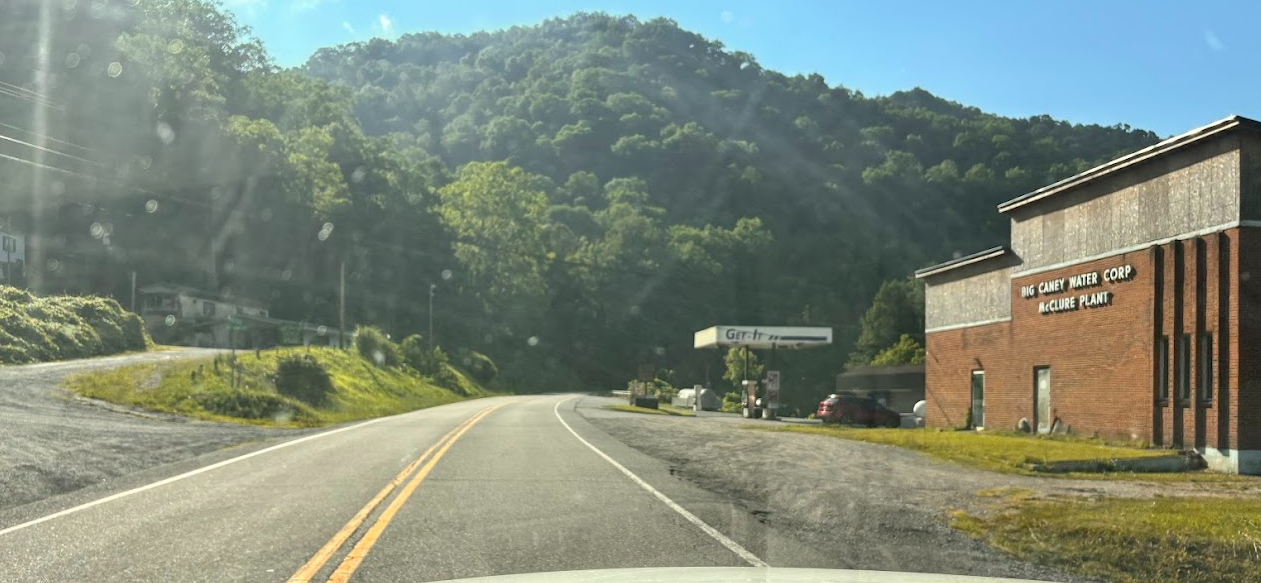
Entering McClure on SR 63, southbound

McClure is an unincorporated community in Dickenson County, Virginia, United States. McClure is located along the McClure River and Virginia State Route 63, 5.5 miles (8.9 km) southeast of Clintwood. McClure had a post office from 1919 until it closed on July 6, 2011; it still has its own ZIP code, 24269.

The population of McClure is around 300.

According to legend, McClure was named for an Anglo-Scottish pioneer settler who was killed by Indians. McClure is known as the birthplace of legendary bluegrass singer Ralph Stanley.
