= West Dante, Virginia =

Unincorporated community in Virginia, United States

Coordinates: 36°58′44″N 82°19′18″W

West Dante is an unincorporated community in Dickenson County, Virginia, United States.

== History ==
A post office was established at West Dante in 1936, and remained in operation until it was discontinued in 1947. West Dante lies west of Dante, hence the name.
