= Longfork, Virginia =

Unincorporated community in Virginia, United States

Coordinates: 37°07′23″N 82°29′36″W

Longfork is an unincorporated community in Dickenson County, Virginia, United States.

== History ==
A post office was established at Longfork in 1924, and remained in operation until it was discontinued in 1949. Longfork was named from the nearby Long Fork Creek.
