= Tivis, Virginia =

Unincorporated community in Virginia, United States

Coordinates: 37°14′48″N 82°22′21″W

Tivis is an unincorporated community in Dickenson County, Virginia, United States.

== History ==
A post office was established at Tivis in 1916, and remained in operation until it was discontinued in 1958. The community was named for Tivis Colley, an early postmaster's father.
