= Bucu, Virginia =

Unincorporated community in Virginia, United States

Coordinates: 37°04′07″N 82°12′48″W

Bucu is an unincorporated community in Dickenson County, Virginia, United States.

== History ==
A post office was established at Bucu in 1883, and remained in operation until it was discontinued in 1957. Bucu took its name from the brand of a popular medication.
