= Birchleaf, Virginia =

Unincorporated community in Virginia, United States

- Unincorporated community
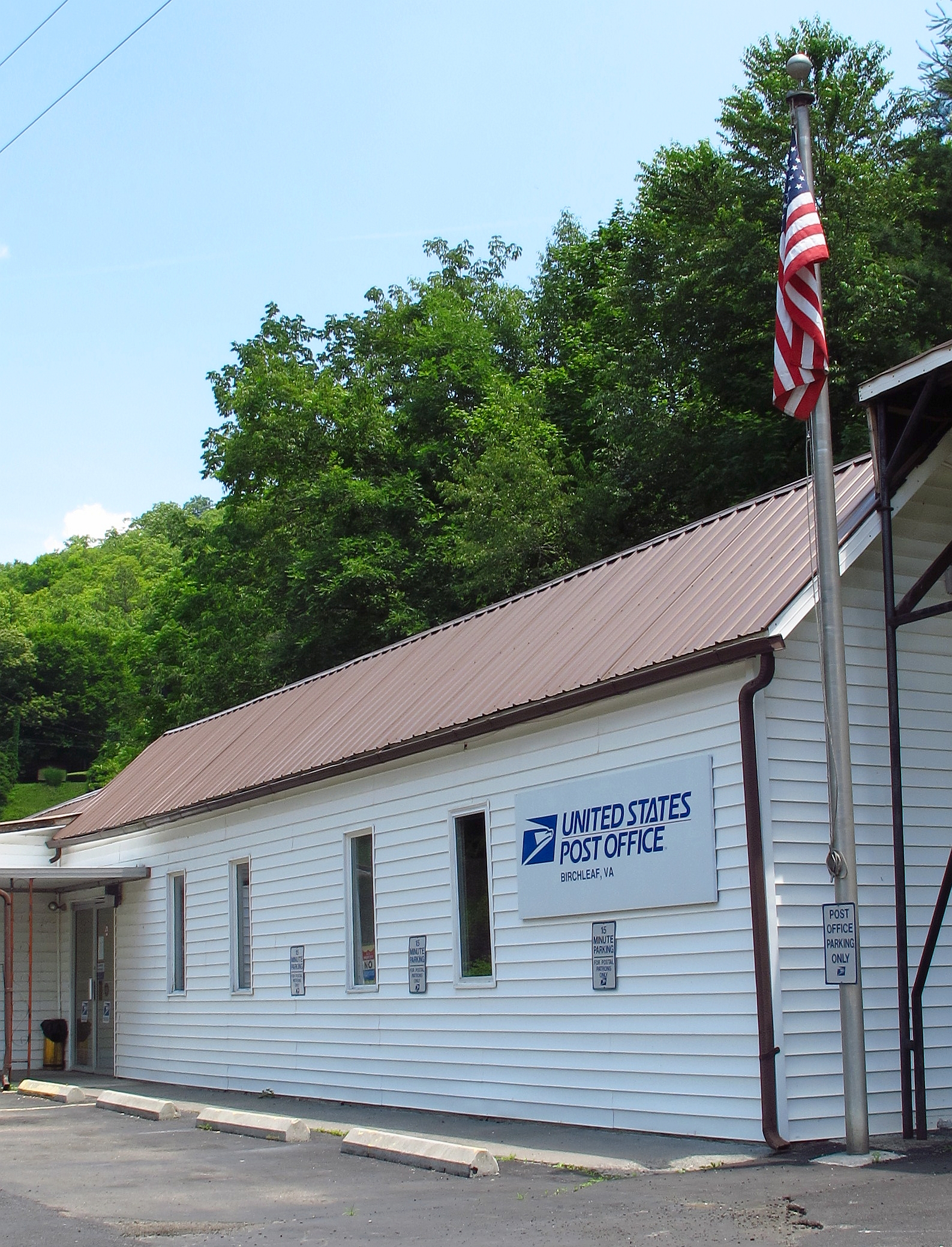
- Post Office in Birchleaf

- Location within Virginia Location within the United States
- Coordinates: 37°10′38″N 82°16′20″W
- Country: United States
- State: Virginia
- County: Dickenson
- Elevation: 1,299 ft (396 m)
- Time zone: UTC-5 (Eastern (EST))
  - Summer (DST): UTC-4 (EDT)
- Zip Code: 24220
- GNIS feature ID: 1495271

Birchleaf is an unincorporated community in Dickenson County, Virginia, United States. The population was 761 at the 2000 census.

Birchleaf was likely named for the birch timber in the area.

== Geography ==
Birchleaf is located approximately five miles southeast of the town of Haysi. The Russell Fork of the Levisa River runs through the center of the community. Frequent flooding of this river has resulted in a floodplain in which most of the community is located.

One of the most destructive floods occurred in 1977, the infamous "Flood of '77" as referred to by local residents. Over $20 million in damage occurred to this and other small communities along the Russell Fork River in April of that year.

== Education ==
Birchleaf is served by Sandlick Elementary School and Ridgeview High School. Southwest Virginia Community College also runs a bus to nearby Richlands.
