= Flemingtown, Virginia =

Unincorporated community in Virginia, United States

Coordinates: 37°10′31″N 82°25′31″W

Flemingtown is an unincorporated community in Dickenson County, Virginia, United States.

== History ==
Flemingtown was named for the Fleming family of pioneer settlers.
