= Trammel, Virginia =

Unincorporated community in Virginia, United States

- Unincorporated community
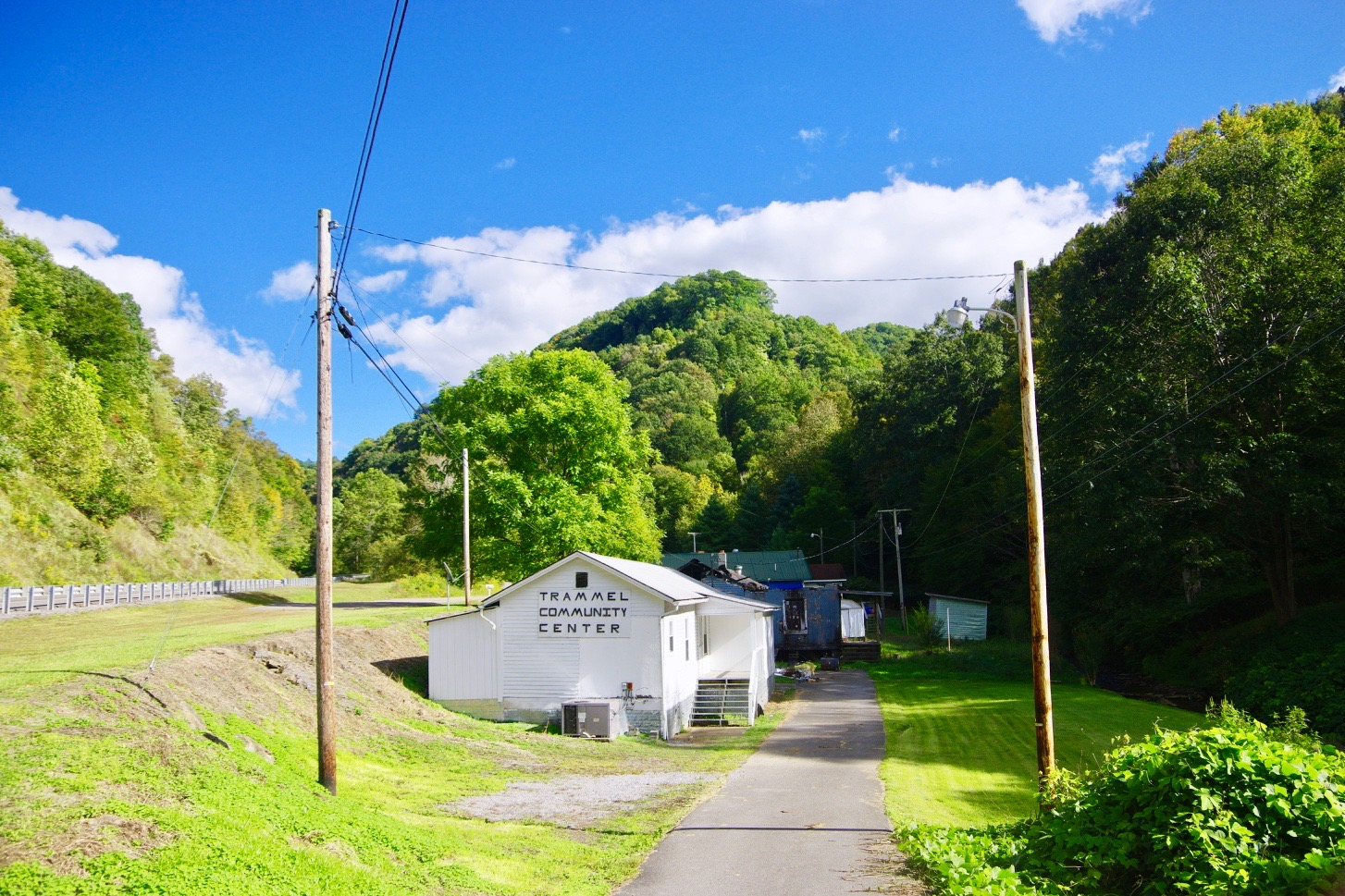
- Trammel Community Center in 2020

- Location within Virginia Location within the United States
- Coordinates: 37°00′52″N 82°17′38″W
- Country: United States
- State: Virginia
- County: Dickenson
- Elevation: 1,749 ft (533 m)
- Time zone: UTC−5 (Eastern (EST))
  - Summer (DST): UTC−4 (EDT)
- ZIP code: 24237
- Area code: 276
- GNIS feature ID: 1477119

Trammel is an unincorporated community in Dickenson County, Virginia, United States. Trammel is located along Virginia State Route 63, 7.6 miles (12.2 km) north of St. Paul. Trammel had a post office with ZIP code 24289 from October 8, 1919, to November 16, 2002; the community is now part of ZIP code 24237.

Trammel was initially settled by a farmer named Hiram Keith. The first school in Trammel, known as the Delphia School, opened in 1898. A new schoolhouse was constructed for the Delphia School in 1924. The Carolina, Clinchfield and Ohio Railway began building a line through Dickenson County in 1913 and drove the last spike in Trammel in 1915; service to the community began in 1916.

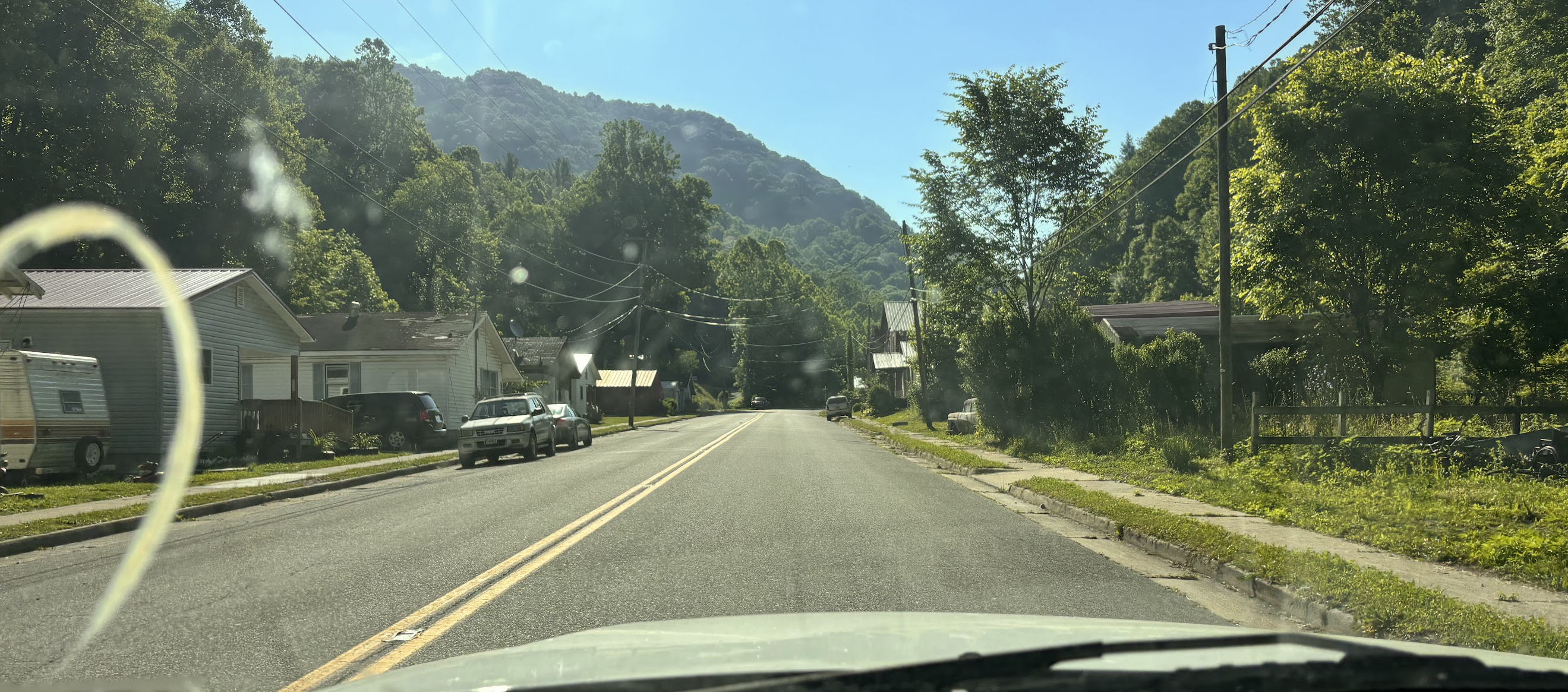
The main area of Trammel, VA, along Virginia State Route 63

Coal mining was the primary industry at Trammel in the 1920s.
