= Skeetrock, Virginia =

Unincorporated community in Virginia, United States

Coordinates: 37°13′19″N 82°24′50″W

Skeetrock is an unincorporated community in Dickenson County, Virginia, United States, situated along the mountainous terrain of the Appalachian region near the Kentucky border.

== History ==
A post office was established at Skeetrock in 1901, and remained in operation until it was discontinued in 1958. Skeetrock was so named because locals would skate, or skeet, on the slippery creek bed.
