= Breaks Interstate Park =

State park in Kentucky and Virginia, US

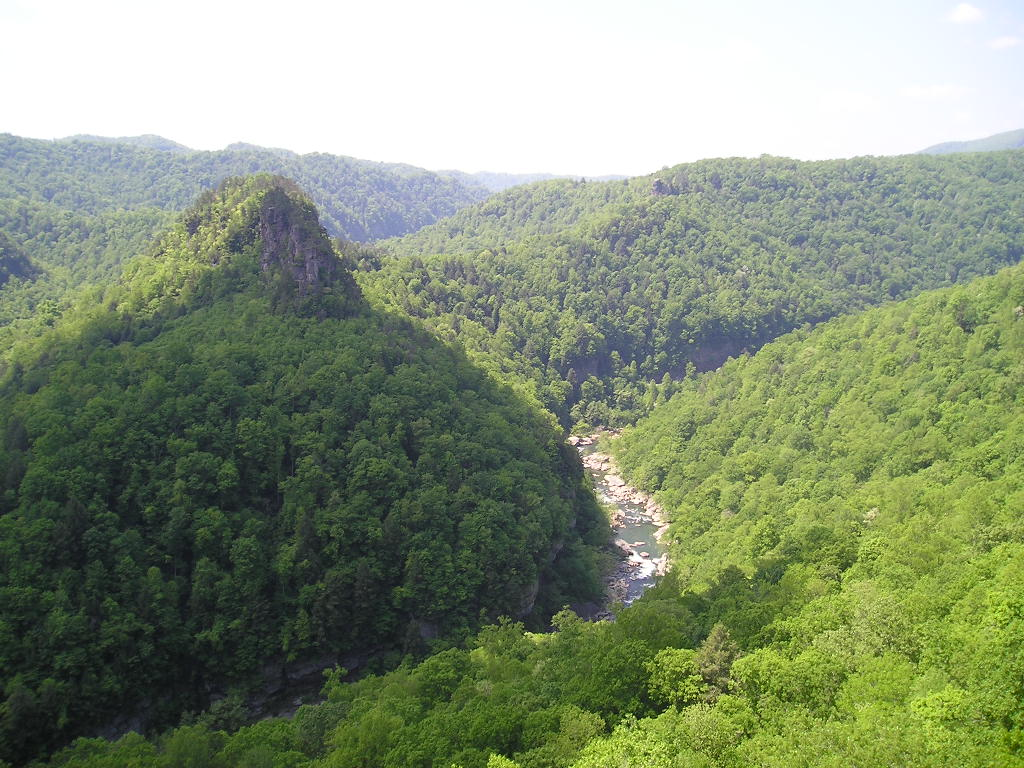
- Breaks Canyon, May 2003

- Location within Kentucky Location within Virginia Location within the United States
- Location: Kentucky and Virginia, United States
- Nearest city: Elkhorn City, Kentucky
- Coordinates: 37°17′47″N 82°17′49″W
- Area: 4,500 acres (1,800 ha)
- Established: 1954
- Visitors: 286,401 (in 2014)
- Governing body: Breaks Interstate Park Compact
- Administrator: Austin Bradley
- Website: Official website

Breaks Interstate Park, also known as "the Breaks," is a bi-state state park located partly in southeastern Kentucky and southwestern Virginia in the Jefferson National Forest, at the northeastern terminus of Pine Mountain. The land is managed by an interstate compact between the states of Virginia and Kentucky. It is one of two interstate parks in the United States operated jointly under a compact rather than as two separate state park units. The Virginia Department of Conservation and Recreation and the Kentucky Department of Parks are still major partner organizations.

Breaks Interstate Park has been called the "Grand Canyon of the South". Russell Fork river and Clinchfield Railroad (now the CSX Transportation Kingsport Subdivision) both pass through it. It is accessed via Virginia 80 and Kentucky 80 between Haysi, Virginia, and Elkhorn City, Kentucky, and passes through the community of Breaks, Virginia, east of the park.

== History ==
This area was previously covered by a vast inland sea around 180 million years ago. Over subsequent millennia, the Russell Fork gradually carved through the rock to form the spectacular valleys. Early human activity saw the area serve as hunting grounds for Shawnee and Cherokee people. In 1767, American frontiersman Daniel Boone passed through the area looking for an easier westward passage through Pine Mountain. Boone subsequently gave the area its current name, The Breaks.

Preparations have been made to provide elk viewing areas. Elk were seen near the park in 2023 for the first time since the 1800s.

== Geography ==
Breaks Interstate Park is located about 5 miles (8 km) east of Elkhorn City, Kentucky. The park covers 4,500 acres (1,800 ha). The park's main feature, Breaks Canyon, is five miles long and ranges from 830 to 1,600 feet (250 to 490 m) deep. The canyon was formed by the Russell Fork river through millions of years of erosion.

=== Climate ===
The climate in this area is characterized by hot, humid summers and generally mild to cool winters. According to the Köppen Climate Classification system, nearby Elkhorn City has a humid subtropical climate, abbreviated "Cfa" on climate maps.

Climate data for Elkhorn City, Kentucky
Month	Jan	Feb	Mar	Apr	May	Jun	Jul	Aug	Sep	Oct	Nov	Dec	Year
Record high °F (°C)	78 (26)	83 (28)	89 (32)	92 (33)	98 (37)	100 (38)	101 (38)	100 (38)	102 (39)	90 (32)	85 (29)	80 (27)	102 (39)
Mean daily maximum °F (°C)	42 (6)	47 (8)	56 (13)	66 (19)	73 (23)	80 (27)	83 (28)	82 (28)	77 (25)	67 (19)	57 (14)	45 (7)	65 (18)
Mean daily minimum °F (°C)	23 (−5)	26 (−3)	32 (0)	40 (4)	49 (9)	59 (15)	63 (17)	62 (17)	55 (13)	43 (6)	33 (1)	26 (−3)	43 (6)
Record low °F (°C)	−14 (−26)	−12 (−24)	−3 (−19)	21 (−6)	25 (−4)	40 (4)	40 (4)	45 (7)	34 (1)	19 (−7)	9 (−13)	−11 (−24)	−14 (−26)
Average precipitation inches (mm)	3.19 (81)	3.20 (81)	3.43 (87)	4.06 (103)	4.89 (124)	4.50 (114)	5.20 (132)	3.86 (98)	3.14 (80)	2.82 (72)	2.91 (74)	3.27 (83)	44.47 (1,129)
Source: The Weather Channel.

== Activities ==
The park provides hiking trails, as well as fishing, paddle boating, canoeing, and hydro biking on Laurel Lake, and white-water rafting on the Russell Fork. Rock climbers encounter sandstone similar to the nearby New River Gorge. A lodge, cottages, and a campground are available. The park has a visitor center with exhibits on the area's historical and natural features, a conference center with restaurant, and an amphitheater. Elk viewing opportunities are available through seasonal guided bus tours of the areas where the Rocky Mountain elk was introduced as a replacement for the extinct Eastern elk.

== Gallery ==
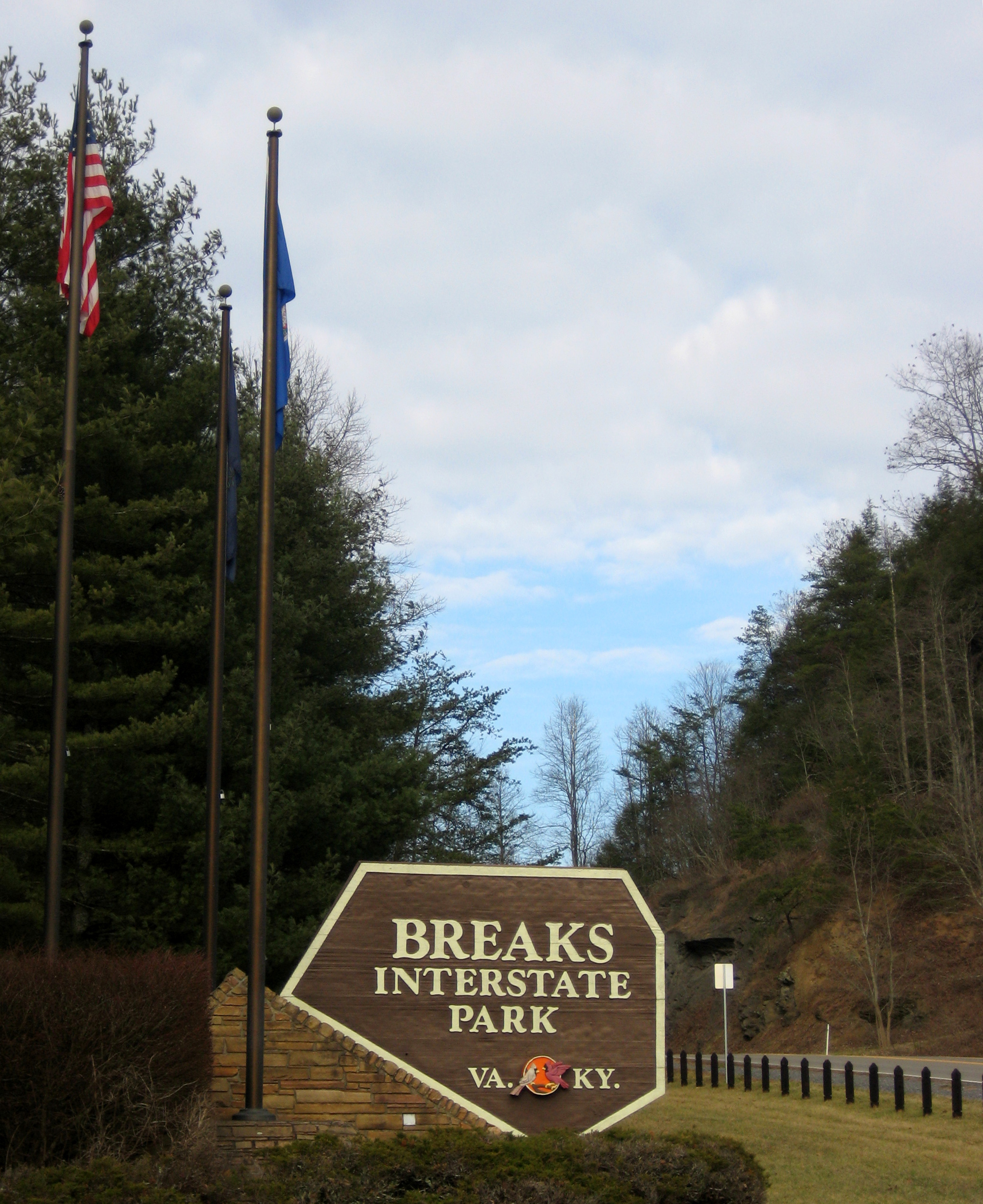

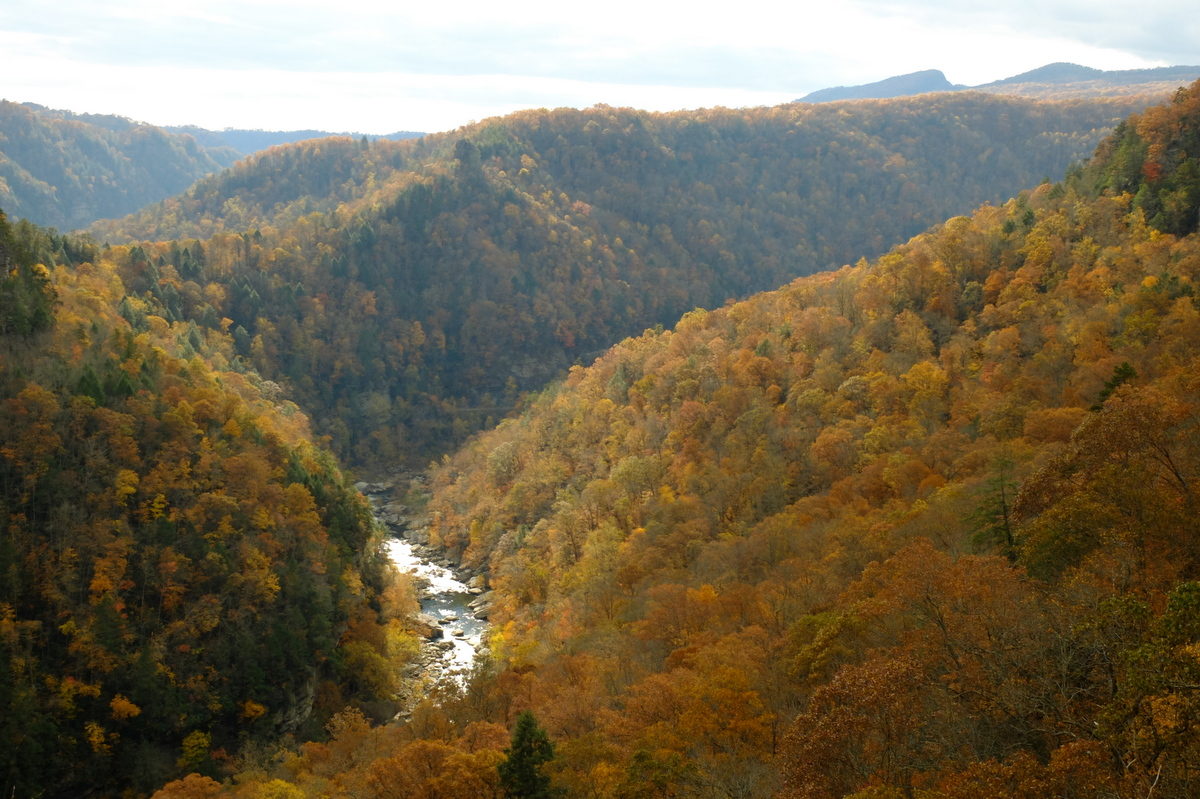

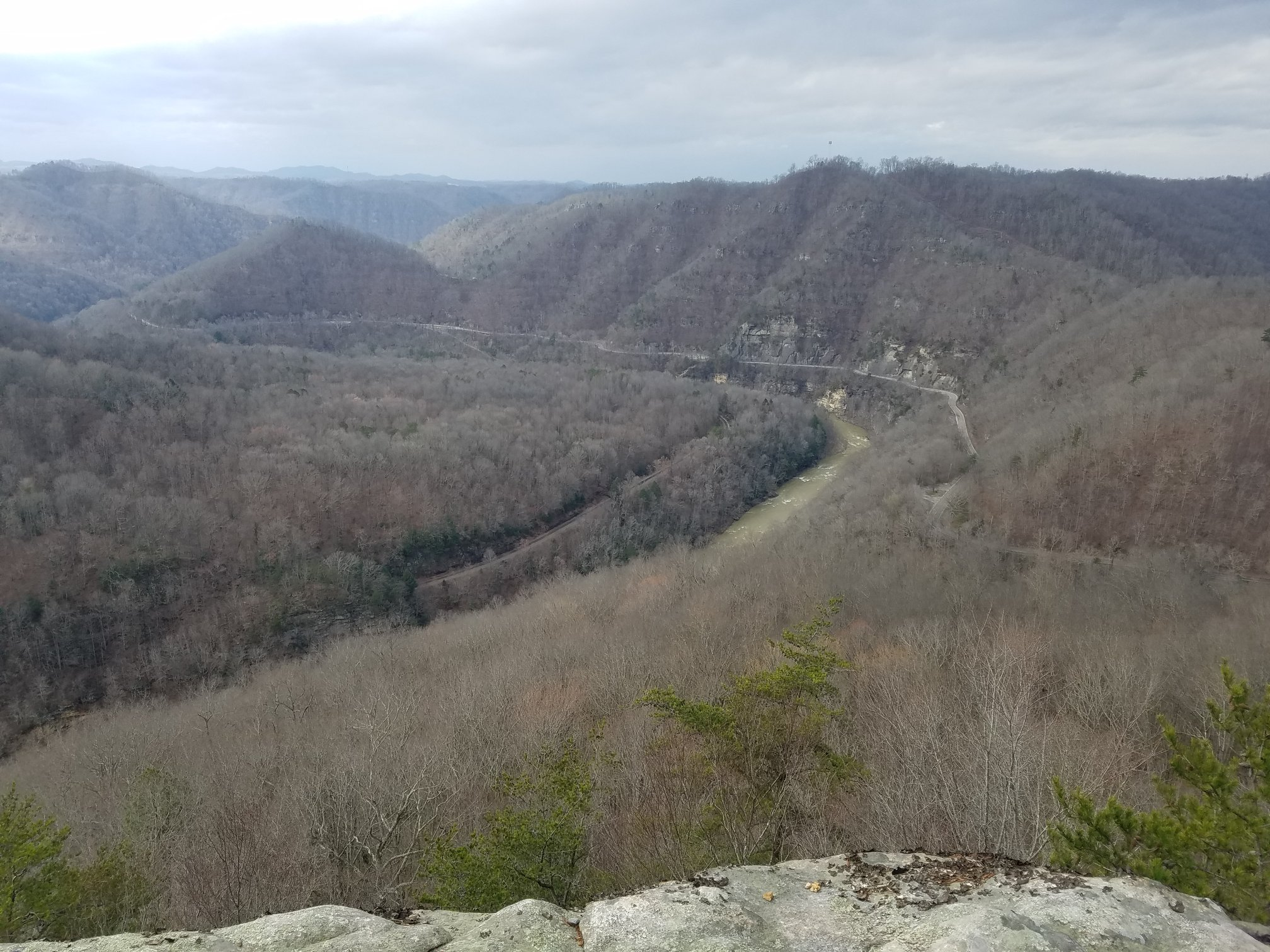

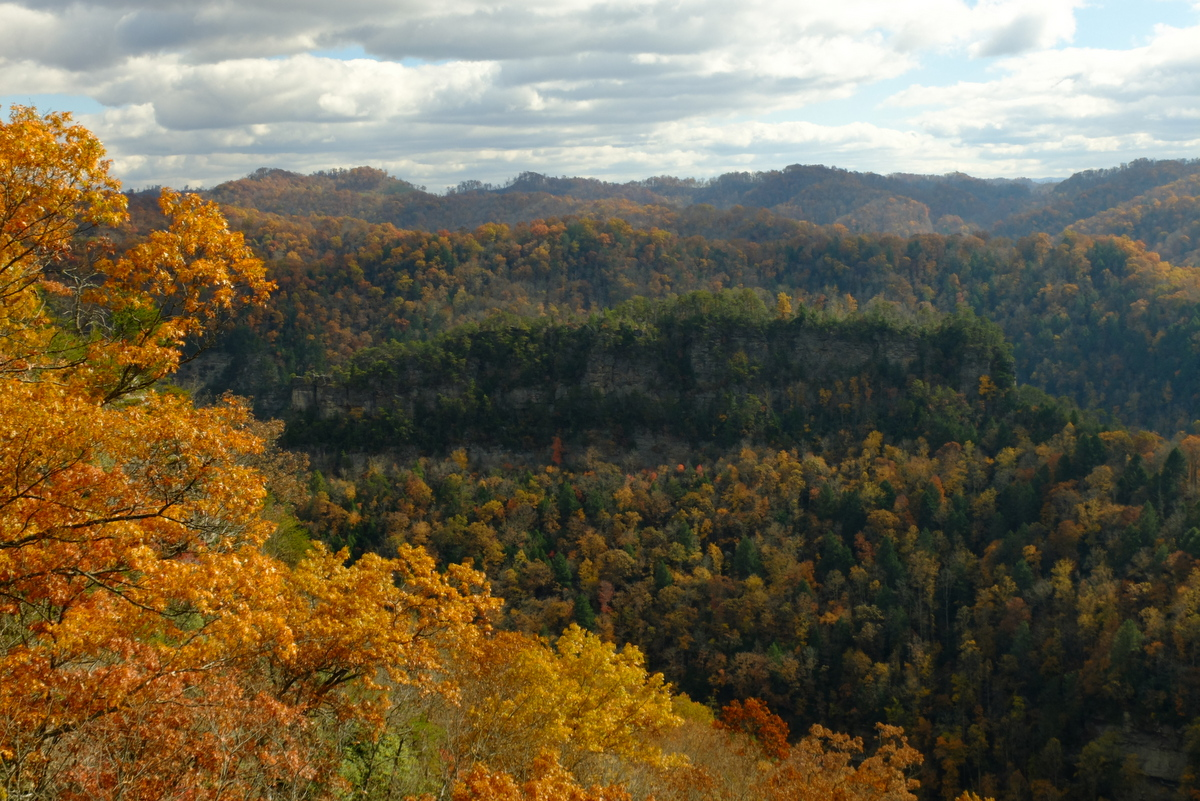

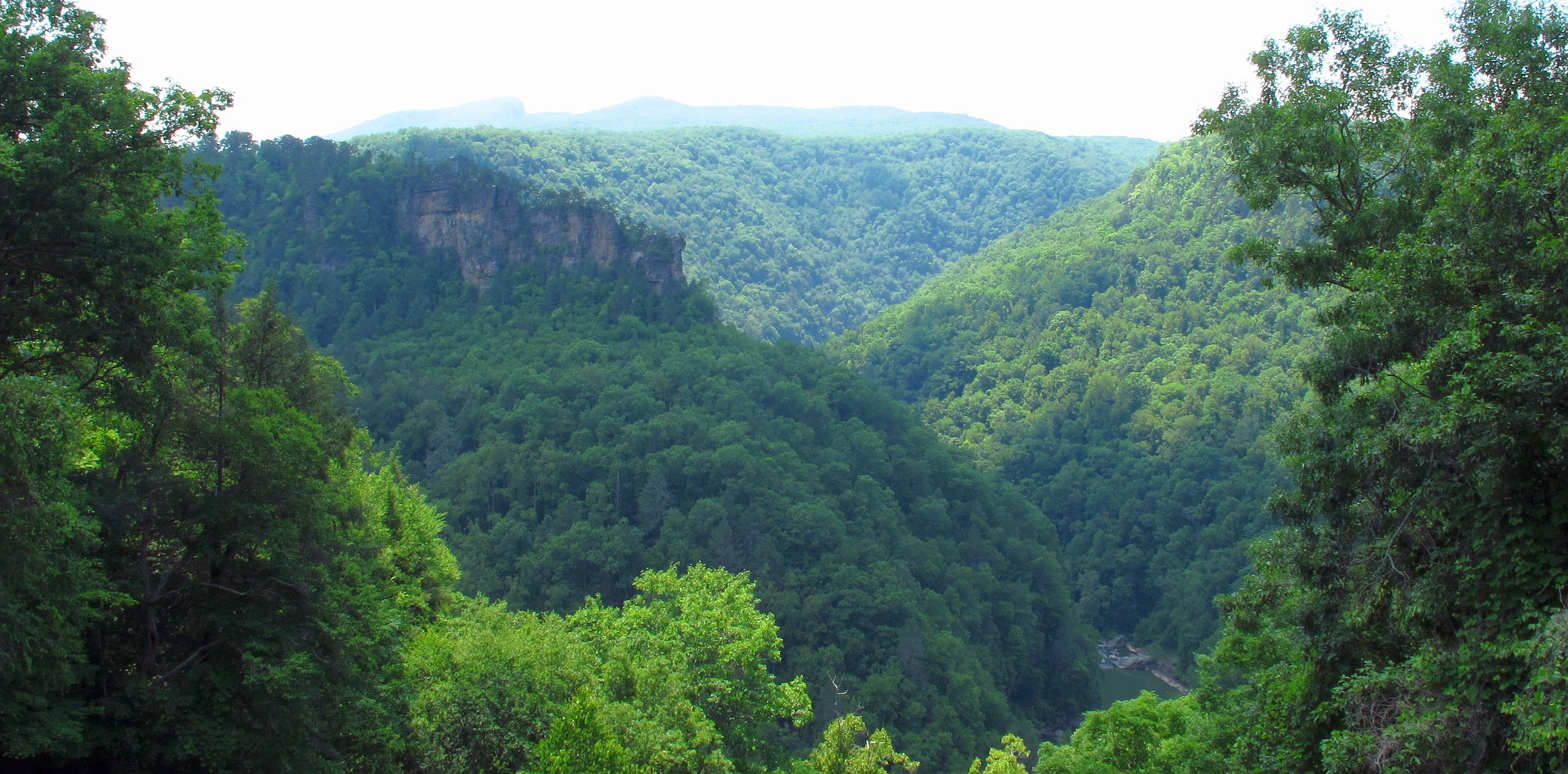
A view of Russell Fork

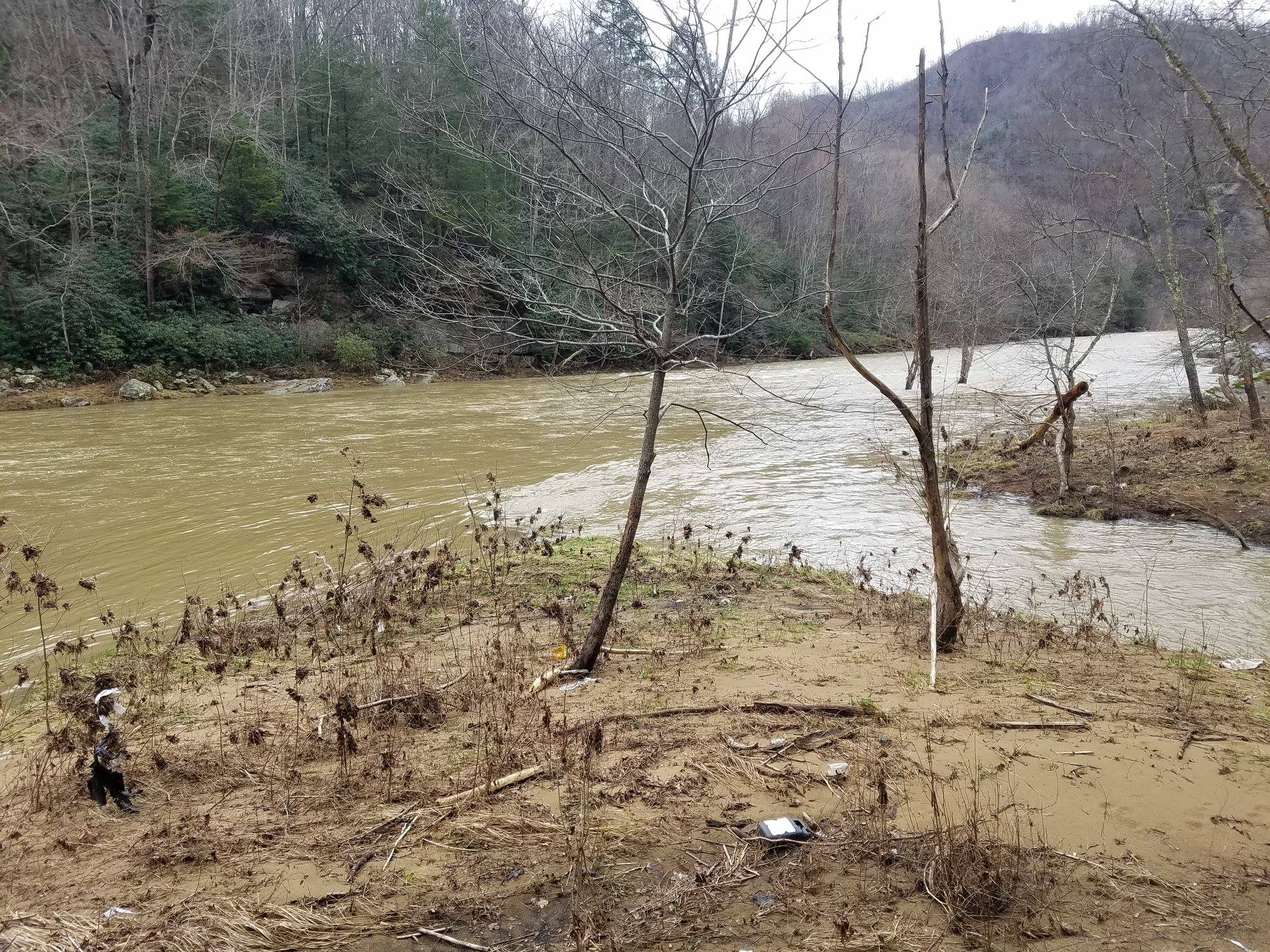
Russell Fork while flooded

== See also ==
- List of Virginia state parks
- List of Kentucky state parks
