= Wakenva, Virginia =

Unincorporated community in Virginia, United States

Coordinates: 37°02′30″N 82°18′48″W

Wakenva is an unincorporated community in Dickenson County, Virginia, United States.

== History ==
A post office was established at Wakenva in 1926, and remained in operation until it was discontinued in 1957. The name of the community is a portmanteau of West Virginia, Kentucky, and Virginia.
