= Duty, Virginia =

Unincorporated community in Virginia, United States

Coordinates: 37°04′53″N 82°09′06″W

Location of Duty within the state of Virginia.

Duty is an unincorporated community in Dickenson County, Virginia, United States.

== History ==
A post office was established at Duty in 1888, and remained in operation until it was discontinued in 1958. An early postmaster gave the community his last name. Duty was home to one of the largest coal mines in the world at the time, Clinchfield Coal Company's Moss #3 complex. The mine produced bituminous coal from a geological anomaly where the Jawbone and Tiller seams came together and produced a single seam of coal anywhere from 25 to 30 ft (7.6 to 9.1 m) thick.
