= Darwin, Virginia =

Unincorporated community in Virginia, United States

Coordinates: 37°06′01″N 82°29′28″W

Darwin is an unincorporated community in Dickenson County, Virginia, United States.

== History ==
Darwin was named for the son of a postal official.
