= Aily, Virginia =

Unincorporated community in Virginia, United States

Coordinates: 37°05′13″N 82°17′08″W

Aily is an unincorporated community in Dickenson County, Virginia, United States.

== History ==
A post office was established at Aily in 1890, and remained in operation until it was discontinued in 1963. Aily Counts was an early postmaster.
