= Nora, Virginia =

Unincorporated community in Virginia, United States

- Unincorporated community
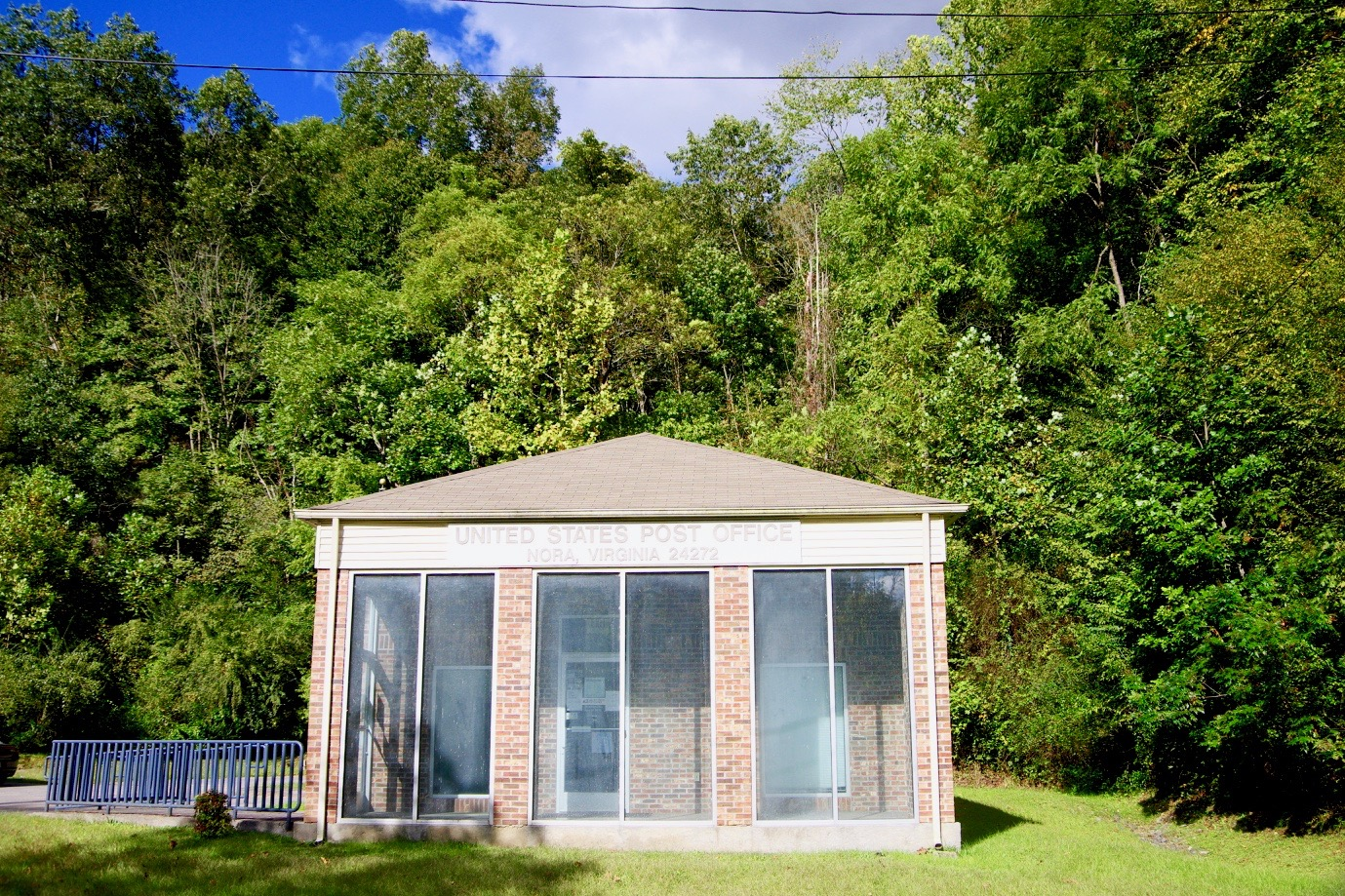
- Post office in Nora (2020)

- Location within Virginia Location within the United States
- Coordinates: 37°04′15″N 82°20′50″W
- Country: United States
- State: Virginia
- County: Dickenson
- Elevation: 1,532 ft (467 m)
- Time zone: UTC-5 (Eastern (EST))
  - Summer (DST): UTC-4 (EDT)
- ZIP code: 24272
- Area code: 276
- GNIS feature ID: 1497048

Nora is an unincorporated community in Dickenson County in the southern U.S. state of Virginia. In the 2000 US census, its population is listed as 566. Nora is situated along the McClure River.

Coal mining has always been the primary business for the community and county. However, in recent years natural gas production has increased sharply because it has become possible to extract gas from the underlying Huron Shale formation. The Huron Shale deposit in this part of Virginia is called the Nora Field.

== History ==
The site of what is now Nora was originally called "Mouth of Open Fork", and in 1882 it was briefly the county seat of the newly formed Dickenson County.

In 1904, a post office was built at Mouth of Open Fork, and the first postmaster, W. A. Dorton, arranged for the community and post office to be named for his wife Nora.

The Clinchfield Railroad, which was built to haul coal from the area, passes through Nora. Construction of the railroad was completed in 1915, when the last track was laid near Nora.

Up through the 1960s, Nora was known locally as "Tiger Town", because the tiny village had three taverns, resulting in frequent alcohol-induced brawls.

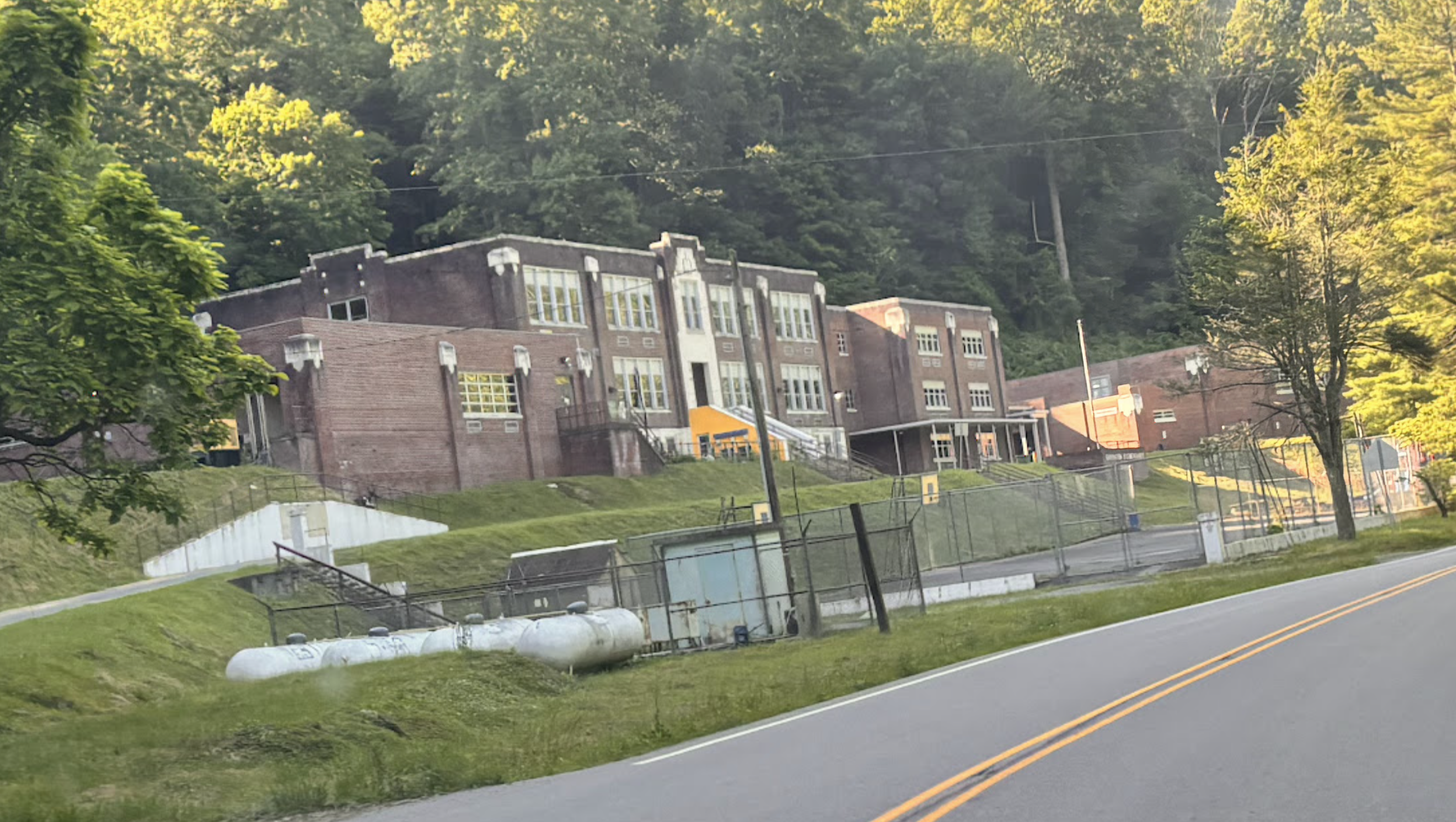
Ervinton Elementary School in Nora

In 1977, the McClure River flooded and destroyed much of Nora.

== Notable people ==
People associated with Nora include:

- Margaret Binns (1884-1968). A native of Brooklyn and a graduate of Vassar, she came to Nora in 1915 on the first train to reach the town. She worked for 50 years as deaconess of the small Episcopal Church in Nora. Her home was a gathering place and recreation center for the children of the town.
- Ralph Stanley, bluegrass musician, grew up in the nearby town of McClure, and he attended high school at Nora.
- Kathleen Counts (1932 - 1983). Counts was a coal miner from Nora. In 1983 she was killed, along with six others, in a mine explosion at McClure. She is believed to be the first woman miner killed in the US.
- Trazel Silvers was a basketball player at Ervinton High School, and he later played professionally, first for the Harlem Globetrotters, and then for several teams in Europe.
