= Haysi, Virginia =

- Town
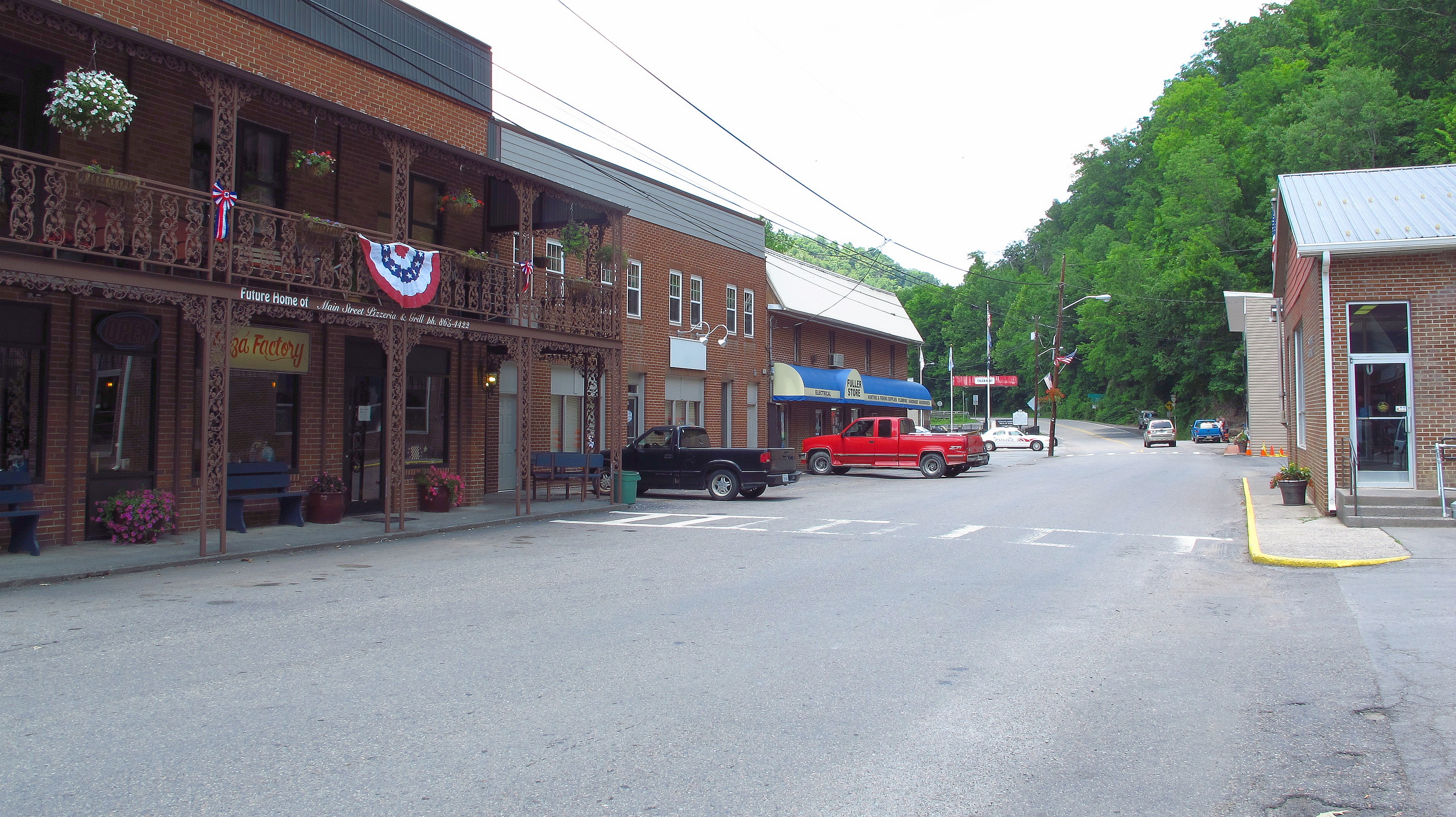
- Main Street in Haysi

- Seal
- Motto: "Where Your Break Begins"
- Location within Virginia Location within the United States
- Coordinates: 37°12′20″N 82°17′41″W
- Country: United States
- State: Virginia
- County: Dickenson
- Incorporated: February 17, 1936

Government
  - Mayor: Larry Yates

Area
  - Total: 3.77 sq mi (9.76 km^{2})
  - Land: 3.66 sq mi (9.48 km^{2})
  - Water: 0.11 sq mi (0.28 km^{2})
- Elevation: 1,270 ft (390 m)

Population (2020)
  - Total: 484
  - Estimate (2019): 465
  - Density: 127.1/sq mi (49.06/km^{2})
- Time zone: UTC−5 (Eastern (EST))
  - Summer (DST): UTC−4 (EDT)
- ZIP code: 24256
- Area code: 276
- FIPS code: 51-36008
- GNIS feature ID: 1483995
- Website: www.haysivirginia.gov

Haysi ( /ˈheɪsaɪ/ HAY-sye) is a town in Dickenson County, Virginia, United States. As of the 2020 census, Haysi had a population of 484.

== History ==
Haysi, once known as "Turkey Foot" or "The Mouth of McClure", is at the confluence of Russell Prater Creek, the McClure River, and the Russell Fork river. The hilly terrain is subject to severe floods, but was occupied at least seasonally for centuries. As English settlers moved into the Appalachians, David Musick and his family settled near New Garden Fort on the Clinch River, but Shawnee raiders burned the house, killed him and abducted his wife and five children on August 12, 1792. The following day, fellow settlers encountered the raiders near here, freed the rest of the family and killed an Indian in the skirmish. About two miles away, in the hamlet known as Birchleaf a historical marker remembers John Colley, who settled nearby and supervised lands claimed by a wealthy landowner before further settlement began in the Sandy Basin area in the 1830s (and which became Dickenson County in 1880). As late as 1911, Haysi was only sparsely populated and was often referred to as a laurel bed.

Local folklore says that in the pioneer days, prior to the establishment of bridges, a ferry boat operator named Si (Silas) shuttled people across the water in that area. Supposedly, travellers arriving at the river and seeing the ferry on the opposite bank, would shout "Hey Si!" to capture his attention and request passage. Thus, the town which grew around the location of this ferry service became known as "Haysi". The myth concerning the town's origins is popular and widely accepted among area residents, but local historians dispute this explanation. Alternately, Haysi is said to have originated from a post office established at a general store owned by Charles M. Hayter and Otis L. Sifers (1878–1921). The owners chose Haysi as a blend of their own surnames when it was necessary to provide a name to the U.S. Post Office.

The first store was constructed within the present town limits of Haysi by Paris Charles for workers of the Yellow Poplar Lumber Company. Haysi began to grow with the construction of the Clinchfield Railroad between 1912 and 1915, as stores sprang up to serve the railroad workers. The railroad was constructed to export natural resources such as timber and coal from the area, and thus later growth of the town centered on workers for the coal mines which began operating around 1916. However, businesses in the town also accommodated travelers, as the rail system was a popular form of transportation at the time, and Haysi was located on a line of the Clinchfield that linked eastern Kentucky with northeast Tennessee, western North Carolina, and South Carolina. Notable early businesses included the McClure Bottling Company, Inc. (established 1914) and the Haysi Supply Company (established 1916). By 1920 Haysi businesses included a hotel, bank, hardware store, and various other retail merchants. By 1930 Main Street was lined with businesses, and the town was incorporated on February 17, 1936.

During the Great Depression, Civilian Conservation Corps crews worked in the Jefferson National Forest nearby, helping to revitalize Main Street. Local politicians attempted to create a new national park at the Breaks, a spectacular gorge of the Russell Fork at the Virginia-Kentucky line that some promoted as the "Grand Canyon of the South", which would help create a tourism sector. However, unlike with Shenandoah National Park to the north, financial accommodations could not be made with the lumber company and railroad, so instead Breaks Interstate Park (operated by state park commissions for Virginia and Kentucky) was created in 1954, and a conference center was added in 1997. In addition, the U.S. Army Corps of Engineers designed and supervised construction of the John W. Flannagan Dam beginning in 1960, which controls area flooding as part of the Big Sandy flood protection system. It remains open to public day use, including fishing and boating.

== Geography ==
Haysi is located in northeastern Dickenson County.

According to the United States Census Bureau, the town has a total area of 3.7 square miles (9.5 km^{2}), of which 3.6 square miles (9.2 km^{2}) is land and 0.1 square miles (0.3 km^{2}), or 3.10%, is water. The town's area was 0.89 square miles (2.3 km^{2}) in 2000.

=== Climate ===
The climate in this area is characterized by relatively high temperatures and evenly distributed precipitation throughout the year. The Köppen Climate System describes the weather as humid subtropical, and uses the abbreviation Cfa.

Climate data for Haysi, Virginia
Month	Jan	Feb	Mar	Apr	May	Jun	Jul	Aug	Sep	Oct	Nov	Dec	Year
Mean daily maximum °C (°F)	34 (1)	47 (8)	61 (16)	70 (21)	80 (27)	85 (29)	87 (31)	84 (29)	78 (26)	69 (21)	55 (13)	46 (8)	66 (19)
Mean daily minimum °C (°F)	13 (−11)	20 (−7)	30 (−1)	39 (4)	50 (10)	58 (14)	61 (16)	60 (16)	54 (12)	43 (6)	30 (−1)	23 (−5)	40 (4)
Average precipitation mm (inches)	3.4 (86)	3.3 (84)	3.7 (94)	3.8 (97)	4.6 (120)	4.5 (110)	4.3 (110)	4 (100)	3.4 (86)	3 (76)	3.2 (81)	3.1 (79)	44.2 (1,120)
Source: Weatherbase

== Demographics ==
Historical population
Census	Pop.	Note	%±
1940	623		—
1950	476		−23.6%
1960	485		1.9%
1970	428		−11.8%
1980	371		−13.3%
1990	222		−40.2%
2000	186		−16.2%
2010	498		167.7%
2020	484		−2.8%
2025 (est.)	472	▼	−2.5%
U.S. Decennial Census

As of the census of 2000, there were 186 people, 80 households, and 56 families residing in the town. The population density was 210.4 people per square mile (81.2 people/km^{2}). There were 99 housing units at an average density of 112.0 per square mile (43.2/km^{2}). The racial makeup of the town was 97.85% White, and 2.15% African American.

There were 80 households, out of which 26.3% had children under the age of 18 living with them, 48.8% were married couples living together, 16.3% had a female householder with no husband present, and 30.0% were non-families. 30.0% of all households were made up of individuals, and 17.5% had someone living alone who was 65 years of age or older. The average household size was 2.33 and the average family size was 2.84.

In the town, the population was spread out, with 18.8% under the age of 18, 10.2% from 18 to 24, 24.7% from 25 to 44, 26.9% from 45 to 64, and 19.4% who were 65 years of age or older. The median age was 42 years. For every 100 females, there were 80.6 males. For every 100 females aged 18 and over, there were 77.6 males.

The median income for a household in the town was $25,781, and the median income for a family was $31,750. Males had a median income of $25,000 versus $15,625 for females. The per capita income for the town was $13,155. About 3.6% of families and 10.9% of the population were below the poverty line, including 10.3% of those under the age of eighteen and 10.8% of those 65 or over.

== Tourist attractions ==
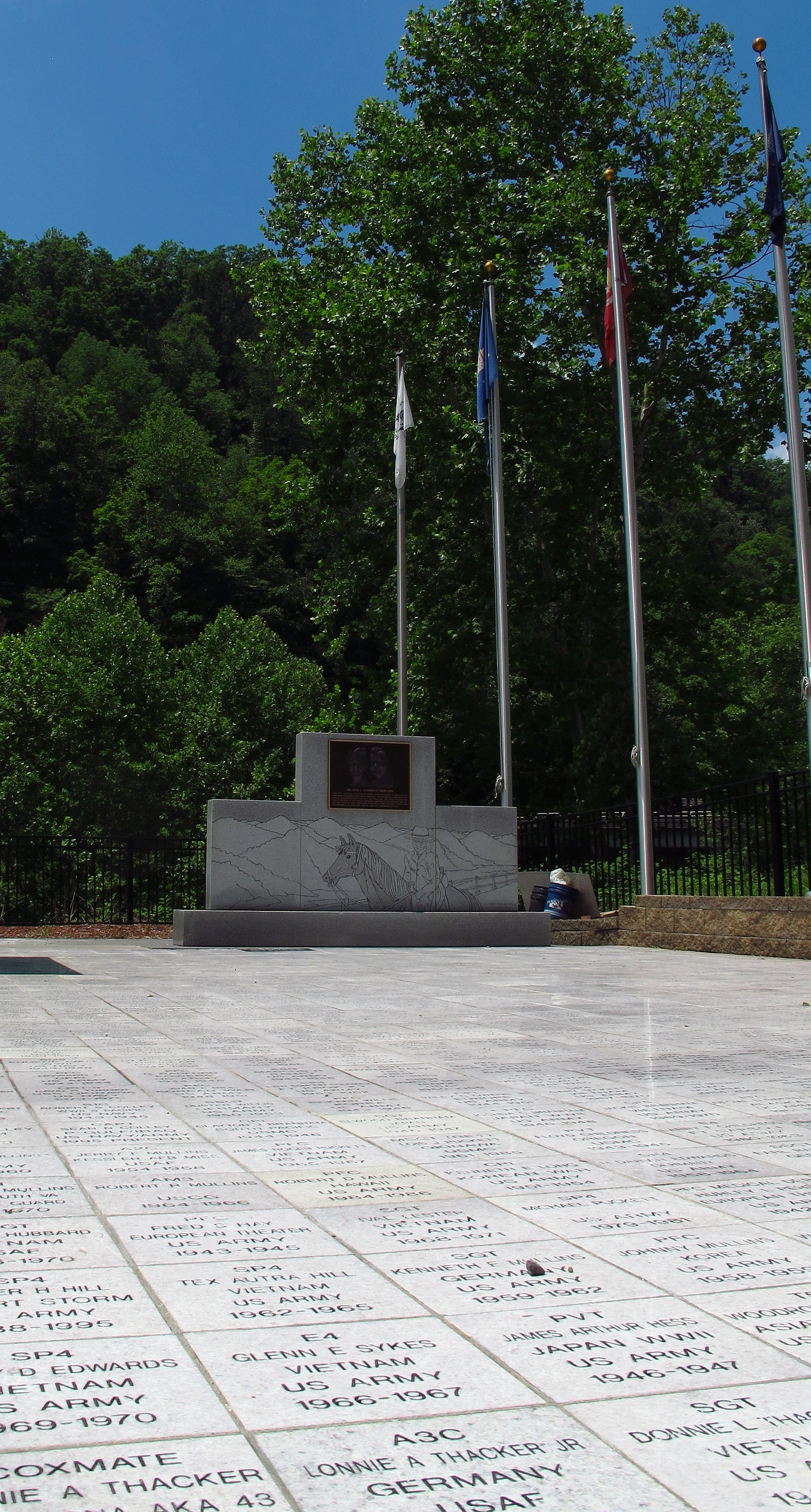
Veterans Memorial Walk of Honor in Haysi

- Birch Knob
- Breaks Interstate Park
- John W. Flannagan Dam
- Russell Fork River
- The Ralph Stanley Museum
- Veterans Memorial Walk of Honor
- Haysi Kiwanis Park

== Education ==
The Haysi area is served by Ridgeview High School and Sandlick Elementary School in the nearby community of Birchleaf, Virginia.

== Infrastructure ==
=== Public transportation ===
Bus service is provided to various locations in Buchanan, Dickenson, Russell, and Tazewell counties by Four County Transit.

== Notable person ==
- William Henry McFarland (born 1890), member of the Virginia House of Delegates
