= Fremont, Virginia =

Unincorporated community in Virginia, United States

Coordinates: 37°07′32″N 82°23′07″W

Fremont is an unincorporated community in Dickenson County, Virginia, United States.

== History ==
A post office was established at Fremont in 1917, and remained in operation until it was discontinued in 1962. The community was named for John C. Frémont, an American explorer.
