= Elkhorn City, Kentucky =

- City
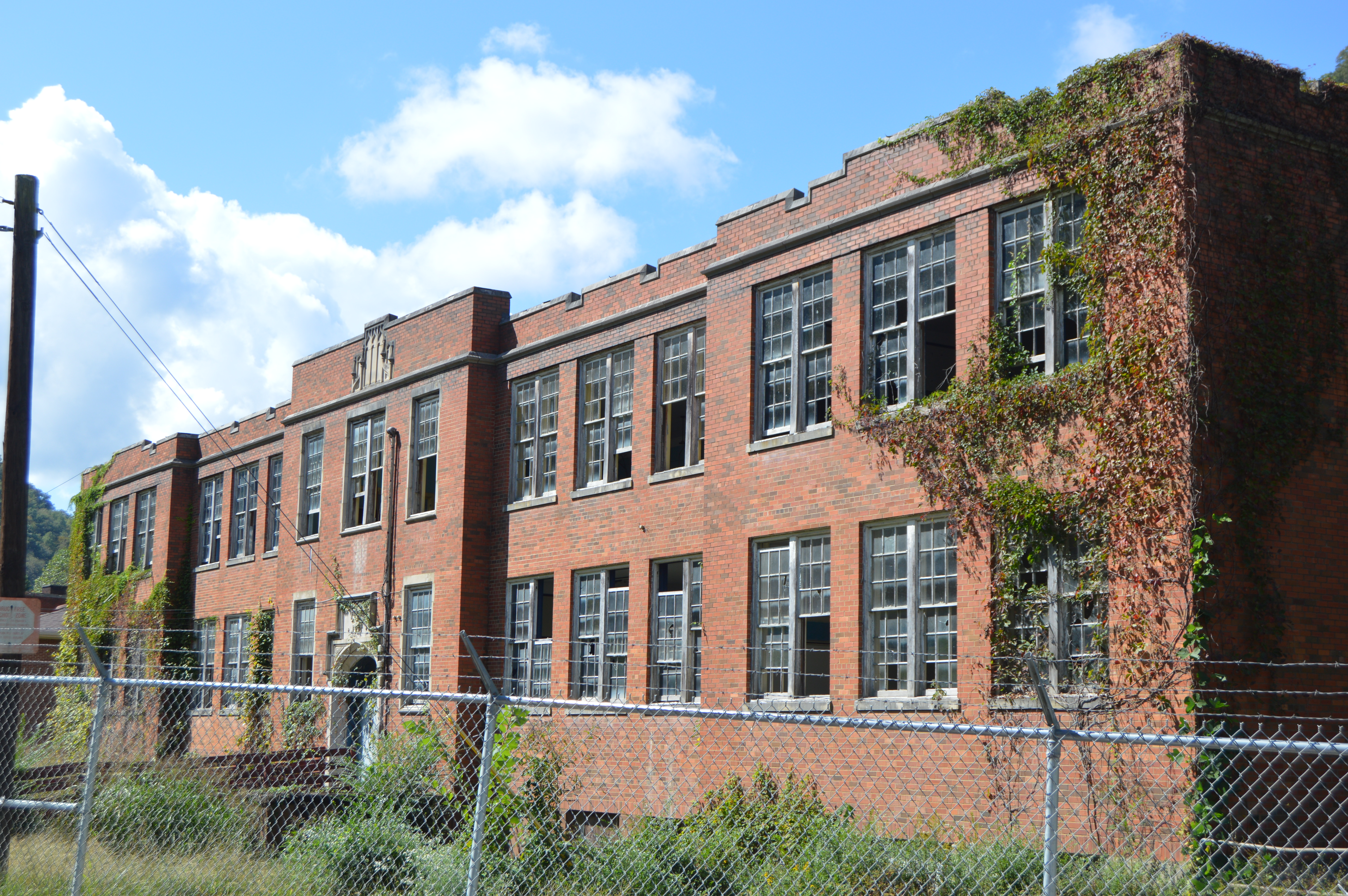
- Former high school
- Nickname: "Gateway to the Breaks"
- Location of Elkhorn City in Pike County, Kentucky.
- Coordinates: 37°19′13″N 82°21′08″W
- Country: United States
- State: Kentucky
- County: Pike
- Incorporated: November 4, 1912

Government
  - Type: Mayor-Council
  - Current Mayor: Nathan Bryant
  - Former Mayor: Mike Taylor

Area
  - Total: 7.72 sq mi (19.99 km^{2})
  - Land: 7.72 sq mi (19.99 km^{2})
  - Water: 0 sq mi (0.00 km^{2})
- Elevation: 1,693 ft (516 m)

Population (2020)
  - Total: 1,035
  - Density: 134.1/sq mi (51.76/km^{2})
- Time zone: UTC-5 (Eastern (EST))
  - Summer (DST): UTC-4 (EDT)
- ZIP code: 41522
- Area code: 606
- FIPS code: 21-24382
- GNIS feature ID: 2403554
- Website: https://www.cityofelkhorncity.com/

Elkhorn City is a home rule-class city in Pike County, Kentucky, in the United States. The population was 1,035 at the 2020 census. The city is located in proximity to the Breaks Interstate Park.

== History ==
Elkhorn City was first settled by William Ramey of North Carolina c. 1810. However, in 1767–1768, Daniel Boone took his first steps in what is now Kentucky near present-day Elkhorn City on a hunting expedition.

It was originally named "Elkhorn", after an elk's horn that was found on the banks of the nearby creek (also named Elkhorn.) Because there was already a town named "Elk Horn" in Taylor County, the town had to be renamed in order to avoid confusion. On October 16, 1882, the post office was renamed "Praise" for "Camp Praise-the-Lord", a tent colony that was established by evangelist George O. Barnes for a revival there in August 1881. In 1907, the Chesapeake and Ohio Railway established a station in Praise that was named "Elkhorn City". Although Elkhorn City was incorporated as a city on November 4, 1912, the local post office was not renamed Elkhorn City until September 1, 1952, after local pressure for a uniform name.

The neighboring settlement of Cedarville merged with Elkhorn City in 2009.

== Geography ==
According to the United States Census Bureau, the city has a total area of 2.0 square miles (5.2 km^{2}), all land.

Elkhorn City lies in the foothills of the Appalachian Mountains of Eastern Kentucky. The Russell Fork of the Big Sandy River flows through the center of the city. It is well known for as a whitewater rafting destination, featuring Class II-VI rapids.

Elkhorn City is also geographically located at the northernmost point of the Pine Mountain along with the northern terminus of Pine Mountain Trail. Once completed, the trail will extend from the Breaks Interstate Park to Cumberland Gap National Historical Park along the ridge of Pine Mountain.

Elkhorn City is the easternmost incorporated municipality in Kentucky. Freeburn and Phelps are technically farther east, but both are considered CDPs.

=== Climate ===
The climate in this area is characterized by hot, humid summers and generally mild to cool winters. According to the Köppen Climate Classification system, Elkhorn City has a humid subtropical climate, abbreviated "Cfa" on climate maps.

Climate data for Elkhorn City, Kentucky
Month	Jan	Feb	Mar	Apr	May	Jun	Jul	Aug	Sep	Oct	Nov	Dec	Year
Record high °F (°C)	78 (26)	83 (28)	89 (32)	92 (33)	98 (37)	100 (38)	101 (38)	100 (38)	102 (39)	90 (32)	85 (29)	80 (27)	102 (39)
Mean daily maximum °F (°C)	42 (6)	47 (8)	56 (13)	66 (19)	73 (23)	80 (27)	83 (28)	82 (28)	77 (25)	67 (19)	57 (14)	45 (7)	65 (18)
Mean daily minimum °F (°C)	23 (−5)	26 (−3)	32 (0)	40 (4)	49 (9)	59 (15)	63 (17)	62 (17)	55 (13)	43 (6)	33 (1)	26 (−3)	43 (6)
Record low °F (°C)	−14 (−26)	−12 (−24)	−3 (−19)	21 (−6)	25 (−4)	40 (4)	40 (4)	45 (7)	34 (1)	19 (−7)	9 (−13)	−11 (−24)	−14 (−26)
Average precipitation inches (mm)	3.19 (81)	3.20 (81)	3.43 (87)	4.06 (103)	4.89 (124)	4.50 (114)	5.20 (132)	3.86 (98)	3.14 (80)	2.82 (72)	2.91 (74)	3.27 (83)	44.47 (1,129)
Source: The Weather Channel.

== Demographics ==
Historical population
Census	Pop.	Note	%±
1890	100		—
1900	87		−13.0%
1910	94		8.0%
1920	821		773.4%
1930	996		21.3%
1940	1,030		3.4%
1950	1,349		31.0%
1960	1,085		−19.6%
1970	1,081		−0.4%
1980	1,446		33.8%
1990	813		−43.8%
2000	1,060		30.4%
2010	982		−7.4%
2020	1,035		5.4%
U.S. Decennial Census

As of the 2010 United States census, there were 982 people living in the city. The racial makeup of the city was 99.0% White, 0.3% Black, 0.2% from some other race and 0.3% from two or more races. 0.2% were Hispanic or Latino of any race.

As of the census of 2000, there were 1,060 people, 437 households, and 295 families living in the city. The population density was 525.5 inhabitants per square mile (202.9/km^{2}). There were 506 housing units at an average density of 250.8 per square mile (96.8/km^{2}). The racial makeup of the city was 99.34% White, 0.09% African American, 0.28% Native American, 0.09% Pacific Islander, 0.19% from other races. Hispanic or Latino of any race were 0.75% of the population.

There were 437 households, out of which 26.1% had children under the age of 18 living with them, 49.2% were married couples living together, 15.3% had a female householder with no husband present, and 32.3% were non-families. 31.4% of all households were made up of individuals, and 16.0% had someone living alone who was 65 years of age or older. The average household size was 2.22 and the average family size was 2.75.

In the city, the population was spread out, with 18.6% under the age of 18, 7.8% from 18 to 24, 24.2% from 25 to 44, 24.6% from 45 to 64, and 24.8% who were 65 years of age or older. The median age was 45 years. For every 100 females, there were 81.2 males. For every 100 females age 18 and over, there were 77.9 males.

The median income for a household in the city was $22,963, and the median income for a family was $27,237. Males had a median income of $30,139 versus $18,750 for females. The per capita income for the city was $14,323. About 18.0% of families and 19.7% of the population were below the poverty line, including 27.9% of those under age 18 and 11.8% of those age 65 or over.

== Education ==
Elkhorn City has a lending library, a branch of the Pike County Public Library.

== Notable people ==
- Patty Loveless, country music singer
- Robert H. Reed, United States Air Force

== See also ==
- Elkhorn City Railroad Museum
