= Russell Fork =

Coordinates: 37.40677°N 82.44015°W

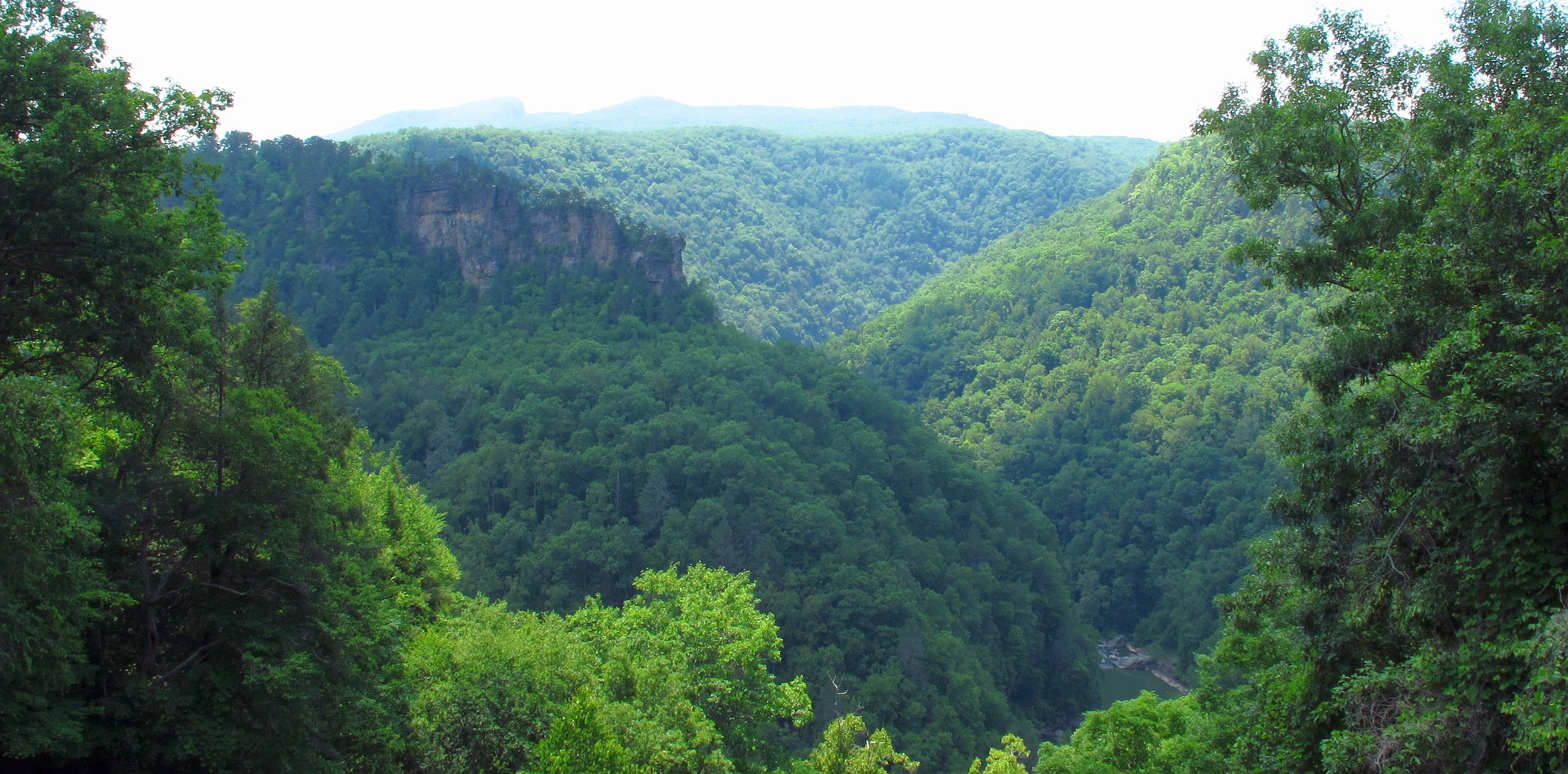
- Russell Fork flowing through Breaks Interstate Park

Location
- Country: United States

Physical characteristics
- Source
  - location: Virginia
- Mouth
  - location: Kentucky

The Russell Fork is a 51.9-mile-long (83.5 km) tributary of the Levisa Fork in southwestern Virginia and southeastern Kentucky in the United States. Known for its whitewater, it rises in the Appalachian Mountains of southwest Virginia, in southern Buchanan County at the base of Big A Mountain, and flows northwest into Dickenson County. The Russell Fork continues to flow through the town of Haysi, Virginia, the Breaks Interstate Park, and the town of Elkhorn City, Kentucky, in Pike County, to the community of Millard, Kentucky where it flows into the Levisa Fork which, together with the Tug Fork, form the Big Sandy River.

== See also ==
- List of rivers of Kentucky
- List of rivers of Virginia
- Breaks Interstate Park
