= McClure River =

Coordinates: 37.20511°N 82.29542°W

Location
- Country: United States

Physical characteristics
- Source
  - location: Virginia
- Length: 17.9 mi (28.8 km)

The McClure River is a 17.9-mile-long (28.8 km) tributary of the Russell Fork in the U.S. state of Virginia. It is located in Dickenson County in the southwestern part of the state. Via the Russell Fork, the Levisa Fork, the Big Sandy River, and the Ohio River, it is part of the Mississippi River watershed.

== See also ==
- List of rivers of Virginia
