= Clinchfield Railroad =

US railroad operating and holding company

- Clinchfield SD40 in Spartanburg, South Carolina in 1968

Overview
- Headquarters: Erwin, Tennessee
- Reporting mark: CCO; CRR
- Locale: Spartanburg, South Carolina to Elkhorn City, Kentucky, U.S.
- Dates of operation: 1902–1983
- Successor: Seaboard System (later CSX)

Technical
- Track gauge: 4 ft 8 1/2 in (1,435 mm) standard gauge

The Clinchfield Railroad (reporting mark CRR) was an operating and holding company for the Carolina, Clinchfield and Ohio Railway (reporting mark CCO). The line ran from the coalfields of Virginia and Elkhorn City, Kentucky, to the textile mills of South Carolina. The 35-mile segment from Dante, Virginia, to Elkhorn City, opened up the coal lands north of the Sandy Ridge Mountains in Virginia's Appalachian region and connected with the Chesapeake and Ohio Railway at Elkhorn City, was completed in 1915.

The Clinchfield was the last Class I railroad built in the U.S. east of the Rocky Mountains.

The Clinchfield Railroad began operating the line on December 1, 1924, and for many years it was leased jointly by the Atlantic Coast Line Railroad and the Louisville and Nashville Railroad. When the L&N merged with the ACL's successor, the Seaboard Coast Line Railroad, effective January 1, 1983, forming the Seaboard System Railroad, the separate operating company was unnecessary and was merged into the Seaboard. The line is now owned and operated by CSX Transportation as their Blue Ridge Subdivision (Spartanburg to Erwin, Tennessee) and Kingsport Subdivision (Erwin to Elkhorn City).

At the end of 1925 the railroad operated 309 miles of road and 467 miles of track; mileages in 1970 were 312 and 501.

== History ==
Revenue freight traffic, in millions of net ton-miles
Year	Traffic
1925	1044
1933	640
1944	1740
1960	1904
1970	4102

The conceptual beginnings of the Clinchfield Railroad predates the railroad era, leading back to the period of westward movement after the Revolutionary War where turnpikes and other ground transportation routes were considered. A transportation route from the Ohio River to the South Atlantic was discussed in a convention held at Estillville, Virginia in 1831. The Estill plan closely resembles the route followed by much of the Clinchfield construction.

Revenue passenger traffic, in millions of passenger-miles
Year	Traffic
1925	10
1933	1
1944	7
1960	0.05
1970	1

=== The Charleston, Cincinnati and Chicago Railroad (1886–1893) ===
In 1886 ex-Union Gen. John T. Wilder received a charter for the Charleston, Cincinnati and Chicago Railroad, commonly referred to as the "Triple C" Railroad. This was the beginning of the modern Clinchfield. The promoters proposed a 625-mile line from Ironton, Ohio, to Charleston, South Carolina, with an extension down the Ohio River to Cincinnati. It would serve the rich agricultural lands of the Piedmont, the summer resorts of the North Carolina mountains, the rich timber and mineral deposits and coal fields of Virginia and Kentucky, with terminals on both the Ohio River and the Atlantic seacoast at an estimated cost of $21 million. Johnson City, Tennessee, was to be established as the headquarters for the Triple C Railroad and a division point.

Wilder succeeded in financing the project which included support from the London-based banking firm of Baring Brothers. Construction progressed at three different locations, from both termination points and the middle. The middle section, built north and south from Johnson City, tracks reached Erwin, Tennessee, in 1890, and grading was 90% complete from Johnson City to Dante, Virginia. Financial issues were reported as early as the third quarter of 1889, when it was reported that contractors were not being paid on time. As early as December, 1890, financial issues started to impact the railroad with the failure of Barker Brothers and Company, of Philadelphia, that had been handling bonds for the railroad. By 1893, the Triple C financial problems were aggravated by the failure of the Baring Brothers, of London, England, and the national panic of 1893.

=== The Ohio River and Charleston Railroad (1893–1902) ===
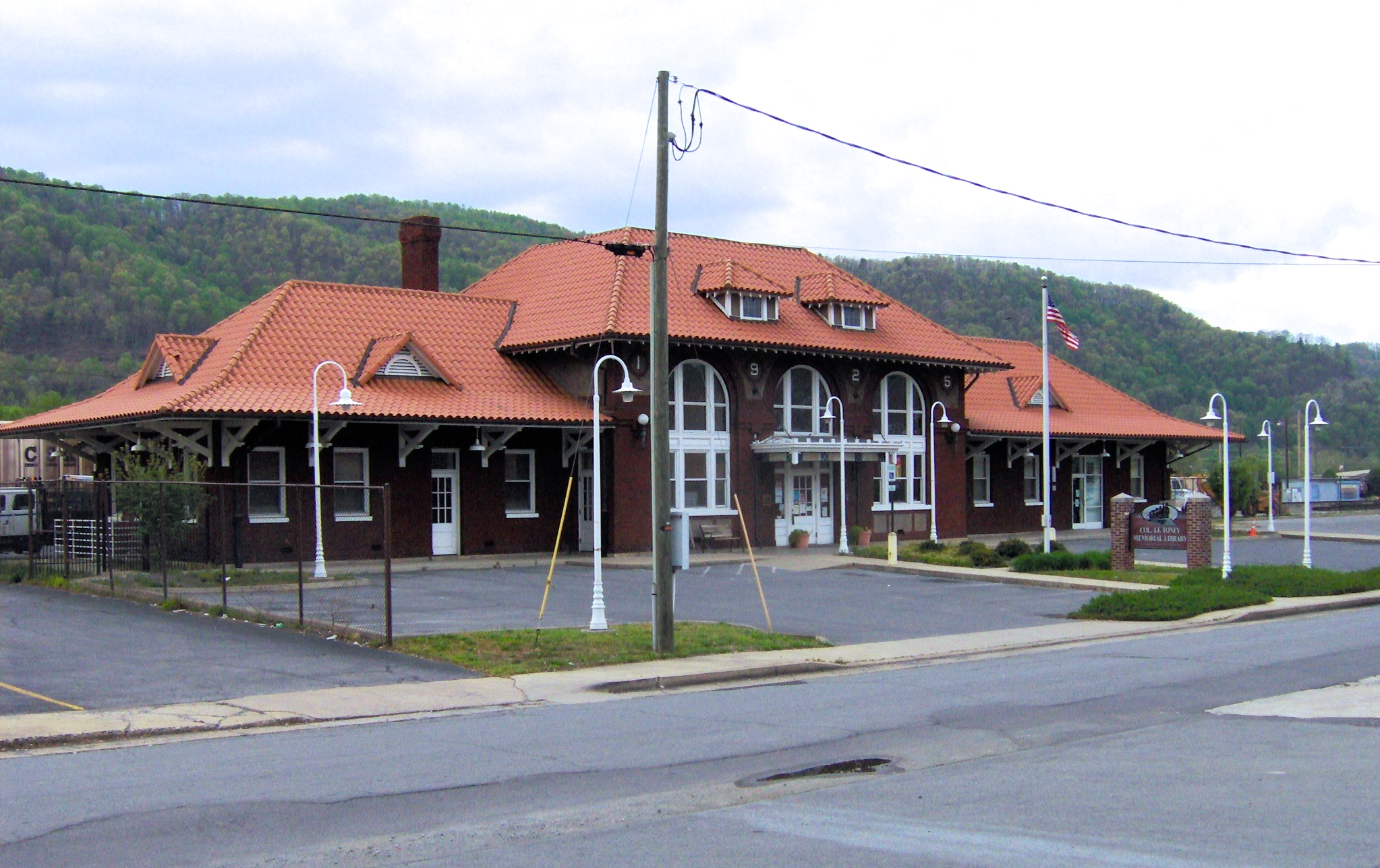
Former Clinchfield depot in Erwin, Tennessee

On July 17, 1893, the assets of the Triple C Railroad held by Baring Brothers were sold at a foreclosure for $550,000 to Charles E. Heller. This included 171 completed and operational miles between Camden, South Carolina, and Marion, North Carolina; 20 completed and operational miles between Chestoa and Johnson City, Tennessee; 60 miles completed but not yet operational miles; and 85 miles between Johnson City and Dante, Virginia, that was still under construction. The new owners renamed it the "Ohio River and Charleston Railroad." The construction continued halfheartedly and in 1897 owners sold the entire Camden to Marion segment to the South Carolina and Georgia Railroad. The last segment to be sold was from Johnson City to Boonford, North Carolina, to George L. Carter in 1902.

=== The South and Western Railway (1902–1908) ===
At the time an enterprising entrepreneur, George Lafayette Carter, was involved in developing the coal fields of southwestern Virginia and needed a railroad to transport his coal to a seaport. In 1902, he purchased the Ohio River and Charleston Railroad, renamed it the South and Western Railway.

Initially it appeared that the railroad construction would continue using the original construction standards of the previous railroad, but new construction standards were developed to which the Clinchfield would ultimately be built. In 1905, M.J. Caples became General Manager and Chief Engineer. He proposed that the railroad that would be hauling heavy cargo, coal, through mountainous terrain should be built to higher standards that would provide for accelerated schedules and lower maintenance and operational costs. With heavy-grade viaducts and bridges, and 55 tunnels (4% of the line), "in constant-value dollars, the five-state CC&O was the most expensive railroad ever built in the U.S." On January 1, 1907, the general offices were moved from Bristol to the Wilder Building in the Carnegie section of Johnson City.

=== Carolina, Clinchfield and Ohio (1908–1983) ===
The charter was granted and the railroad was renamed the Carolina, Clinchfield and Ohio on March 31, 1908. The line from Dante, Virginia to Johnson City was completed in early February 1909 and the line was completed into Spartanburg, South Carolina's Union Depot (affording connections with the Southern Railway's Washington – New Orleans mainline) with the first train, with Mr. Carter on board, arriving on October 29, 1909. Mr. Carter's plans to create the offices, yard and facilities did not come to fruition, reportedly due to the exorbitant price demanded by the land owners. The idea was abandoned and instead land was purchased in Erwin, Tennessee, and operations were located there.

A station was built in 1910 near Little Switzerland, North Carolina, for visitors to the resort. The resort built Etchoe Pass Road, a 4-mile long toll road, connecting to it. The tolls were lifted and the road is now North Carolina Highway 226A. The toll booths are still visible. The station's original name was Mount Mitchell Station but it was subsequently changed to Little Switzerland. In 1954, the railroad retired its last steam locomotive in favor of diesel power.

Passenger service, which began in 1909, ended in 1954. In the latter years of passenger service, trains ran only three times a week in each direction. The end of passenger service left the Southern Railway's Carolina Special as the only remaining passenger train option for traversing the Appalachian range between Tennessee and North Carolina. Freight service continued until 1982, when the Seaboard System Railroad bought all the remaining shares and continued freight operations without the Clinchfield name.

== The Family Lines and CSX ==
In 1972, the Clinchfield was included in the "Family Lines System", a marketing name for Seaboard Coast Line, L&N, and several smaller railroads, which all continued to operate independently. The Clinchfield ceased to exist as a railroad on 1 January 1983 when the Family Lines railroads were merged into a single operating company, the Seaboard System, which merged with the Chessie System to form CSX in 1986.

The Clinchfield is remembered for is its famous "Santa Claus Special" that debuted in 1943 from encouragement from several Kingsport businessmen and ran the length of the Clinchfield's main line between Elkhorn City and Kingsport, Tennessee, handing out gifts to the children along the route. Today, it is operated by CSX Transportation (Seaboard's successor) with the Kingsport Area Chamber of Commerce and is now known as the "Santa Train".
