= Dickenson County, Virginia =

County in Virginia, United States

- County
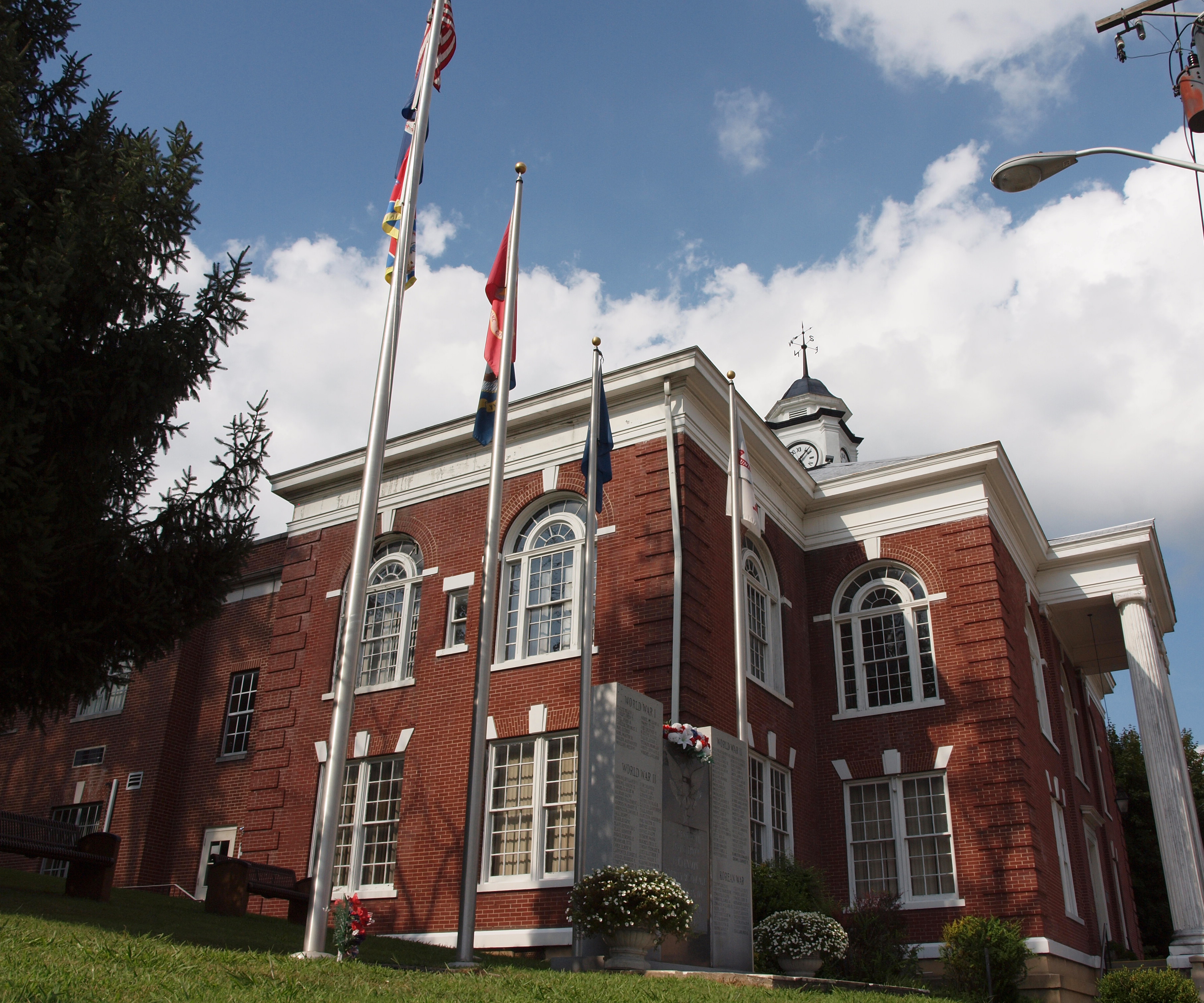
- Dickenson County Courthouse in Clintwood

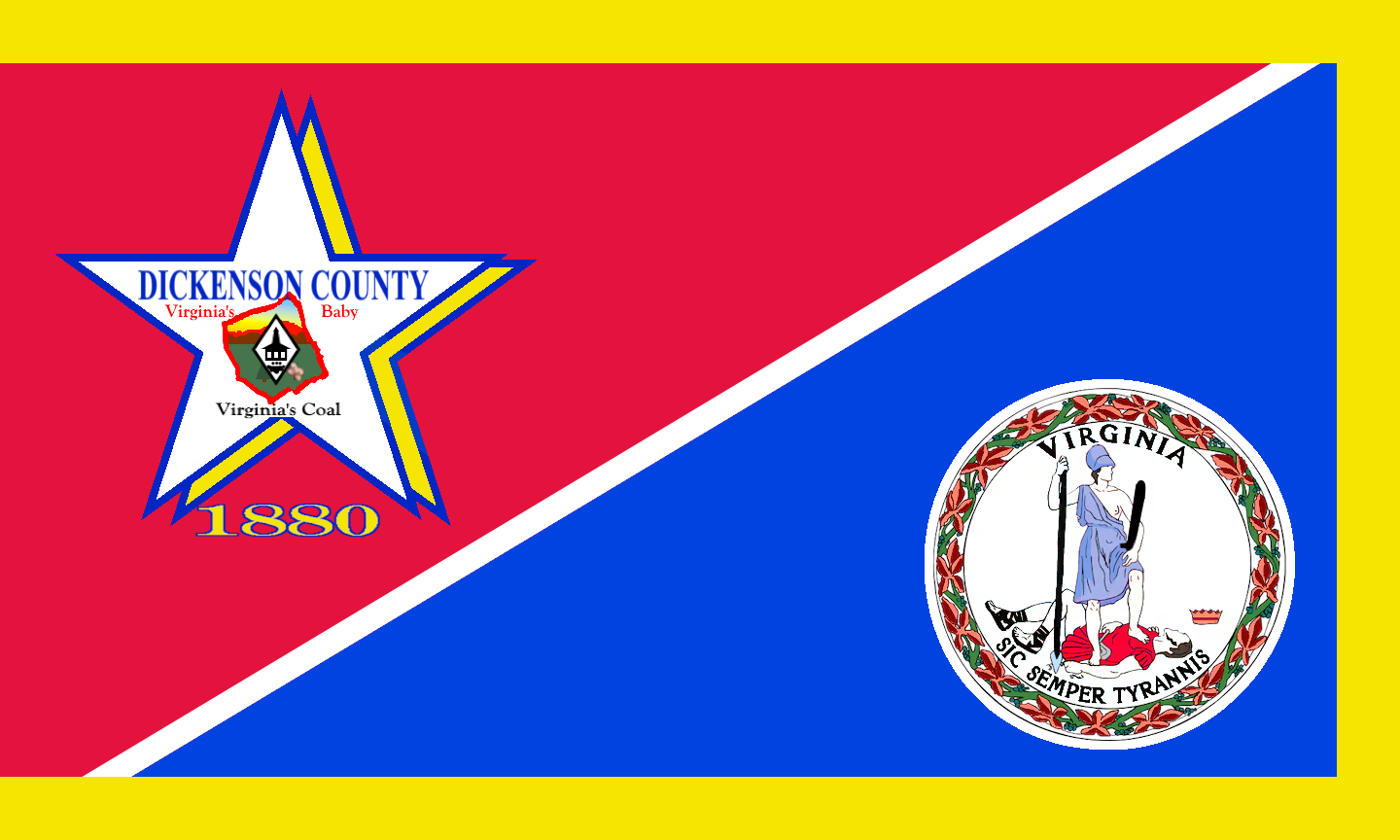
- Flag Seal

- Location within the U.S. state of Virginia
- Coordinates: 37°07′N 82°21′W
- Country: United States
- State: Virginia
- Founded: 1880
- Named for: William J. Dickenson
- Seat: Clintwood
- Largest town: Clintwood

Area
  - Total: 334 sq mi (870 km^{2})
  - Land: 331 sq mi (860 km^{2})
  - Water: 3.1 sq mi (8.0 km^{2}) 0.9%

Population (2020)
  - Total: 14,124
  - Estimate (2025): 13,236 ▼
  - Density: 42.7/sq mi (16.5/km^{2})
- Time zone: UTC−5 (Eastern)
  - Summer (DST): UTC−4 (EDT)
- Congressional district: 9th
- Website: www.dickensonva.org

Dickenson County is a mountainous United States county located in the Commonwealth of Virginia on the Appalachian Plateau. Bordering Kentucky, Dickenson is situated near the far western point of Virginia. Its county seat is Clintwood, and, as of the 2020 census, the county population was 14,124.

Formed in 1880 from parts of several western Virginia counties, Dickenson is the most recently created county in the state. The county was named in honor of William J. Dickenson, a long serving local member of the Virginia General Assembly, who sponsored the creation of the new county.

== History ==
Dickenson County, formed in 1880 from parts of Buchanan County, Russell County, and Wise County, is Virginia's youngest county. It was named for William J. Dickenson (1827-1907), delegate to the Virginia General Assembly from Russell County, 1859–1861, 1865–1867, and 1877–1882. This formation came as a result of demands from the inhabitants that they be represented by a county government closer to the people. In 1880, Delegate Dickenson sponsored the bill in the House of Delegates to establish Dickenson County as the one-hundredth county in Virginia. Dickenson County has since become known as "Virginia's Baby." On June 13, 1932, 10 people were killed when the Splashdam Mine exploded.

== Geography ==
According to the U.S. Census Bureau, the county has a total area of 334 square miles (870 km^{2}), of which 331 square miles (860 km^{2}) is land and 3.1 square miles (8.0 km^{2}) (0.9%) is water.

=== Districts ===
The county is divided into five magisterial districts with a supervisor elected from each district every four years. The districts are: Clintwood, Ervinton, Sandlick, Kenady, and Willis.

=== Adjacent counties ===
- Buchanan County – northeast
- Russell County – southeast
- Wise County – southwest
- Pike County, Kentucky – northwest

=== National protected area ===
- Jefferson National Forest (part)

=== Major highways ===
- SR 63
- SR 72
- SR 80 (U.S. Bicycle Route 76)
- SR 83

== Demographics ==
Historical population
Census	Pop.	Note	%±
1890	5,077		—
1900	7,747		52.6%
1910	9,199		18.7%
1920	13,542		47.2%
1930	16,163		19.4%
1940	21,266		31.6%
1950	23,393		10.0%
1960	20,211		−13.6%
1970	16,077		−20.5%
1980	19,806		23.2%
1990	17,620		−11.0%
2000	16,395		−7.0%
2010	15,903		−3.0%
2020	14,124		−11.2%
2025 (est.)	13,236	▼	−6.3%
U.S. Decennial Census; 1790–1960 1900–1990; 1990–2000 2010 2020

=== Racial and ethnic composition ===
Dickenson County, Virginia – Racial and ethnic composition Note: the US Census treats Hispanic/Latino as an ethnic category. This table excludes Latinos from the racial categories and assigns them to a separate category. Hispanics/Latinos may be of any race.
Race / Ethnicity (NH = Non-Hispanic)	Pop 1980	Pop 1990	Pop 2000	Pop 2010	Pop 2020	% 1980	% 1990	% 2000	% 2010	% 2020
White alone (NH)	19,542	17,467	16,163	15,650	13,691	98.67%	99.13%	98.58%	98.41%	96.93%
Black or African American alone (NH)	92	68	58	51	48	0.46%	0.39%	0.35%	0.32%	0.34%
Native American or Alaska Native alone (NH)	4	13	18	23	22	0.02%	0.07%	0.11%	0.14%	0.16%
Asian alone (NH)	17	14	12	17	12	0.09%	0.08%	0.07%	0.11%	0.08%
Native Hawaiian or Pacific Islander alone (NH)	x	x	0	0	2	x	x	0.00%	0.00%	0.01%
Other race alone (NH)	8	0	4	9	12	0.04%	0.00%	0.02%	0.06%	0.08%
Mixed race or Multiracial (NH)	x	x	70	67	254	x	x	0.43%	0.42%	1.80%
Hispanic or Latino (any race)	143	58	70	86	83	0.72%	0.33%	0.43%	0.54%	0.59%
Total	19,806	17,620	16,395	15,903	14,124	100.00%	100.00%	100.00%	100.00%	100.00%

=== 2020 census ===
As of the 2020 census, the county had a population of 14,124. The median age was 46.3 years. 19.5% of residents were under the age of 18 and 22.7% of residents were 65 years of age or older. For every 100 females there were 101.4 males, and for every 100 females age 18 and over there were 99.0 males age 18 and over.

0.0% of residents lived in urban areas, while 100.0% lived in rural areas.

There were 6,054 households in the county, of which 24.9% had children under the age of 18 living with them and 26.4% had a female householder with no spouse or partner present. About 30.9% of all households were made up of individuals and 15.8% had someone living alone who was 65 years of age or older.

There were 7,344 housing units, of which 17.6% were vacant. Among occupied housing units, 77.4% were owner-occupied and 22.6% were renter-occupied. The homeowner vacancy rate was 1.7% and the rental vacancy rate was 11.1%.

=== 2000 census ===
As of the census of 2000, there were 16,395 people, 6,732 households, and 4,887 families residing in the county. The population density was 49 people per square mile (19 people/km^{2}). There were 7,684 housing units at an average density of 23 units per square mile (8.9 units/km^{2}). The racial makeup of the county was 98.96% White, 0.35% Black or African American, 0.12% Native American, 0.07% Asian, 0.05% from other races, and 0.45% from two or more races. 0.43% of the population were Hispanic or Latino of any race.

There were 6,732 households, out of which 30.40% had children under the age of 18 living with them, 58.00% were married couples living together, 10.60% had a female householder with no husband present, and 27.40% were non-families. 25.30% of all households were made up of individuals, and 11.30% had someone living alone who was 65 years of age or older. The average household size was 2.42 and the average family size was 2.88.

In the county, the population was spread out, with 22.10% under the age of 18, 8.90% from 18 to 24, 27.60% from 25 to 44, 26.90% from 45 to 64, and 14.50% who were 65 years of age or older. The median age was 40 years. For every 100 females there were 95.70 males. For every 100 females age 18 and over, there were 93.60 males.

The median income for a household in the county was $23,431, and the median income for a family was $27,986. Males had a median income of $27,281 versus $17,695 for females. The per capita income for the county was $12,822. About 16.90% of families and 21.30% of the population were below the poverty line, including 26.80% of those under age 18 and 17.30% of those age 65 or over.

== Education ==
=== Public high schools ===
- Ridgeview High School

=== Public middle schools ===
- Ridgeview Middle School

=== Public elementary schools ===
- Ridgeview Elementary School

== Media ==
=== Radio station ===
- WDIC-FM

== Law enforcement ==
Dickenson County Sheriff's Office
- Abbreviation: DCSO

Agency overview
- Formed: 1880

Jurisdictional structure
- Constituting instrument: Yes
- General nature: Local civilian police

Operational structure
- Headquarters: Clintwood, Virginia
- Deputies: 35
- Civilians: 15
- Agency executive: Jeremy Fleming, Sheriff

Website
- Official Website

The Dickenson County Sheriff's Office (DCSO) is the primary law enforcement agency in Dickenson County, Virginia. When the office was formed in 1880, one person was appointed as the Election Supervisor, Tax Collector, and the Chief Law Enforcement Officer. Now the sheriff is an elected official.

== Politics ==
United States presidential election results for Dickenson County, Virginia
Year	Republican		Democratic		Third party(ies)	
Year	No.	%	No.	%	No.	%
1912	398	36.55%	529	48.58%	162	14.88%
1916	753	52.62%	650	45.42%	28	1.96%
1920	1,067	53.62%	903	45.38%	20	1.01%
1924	1,294	42.47%	1,618	53.10%	135	4.43%
1928	1,868	49.85%	1,879	50.15%	0	0.00%
1932	1,228	31.67%	2,635	67.95%	15	0.39%
1936	1,146	29.92%	2,683	70.05%	1	0.03%
1940	1,785	41.10%	2,551	58.74%	7	0.16%
1944	1,762	38.69%	2,786	61.18%	6	0.13%
1948	2,197	42.48%	2,945	56.94%	30	0.58%
1952	2,913	47.41%	3,210	52.25%	21	0.34%
1956	3,444	48.15%	3,695	51.66%	14	0.20%
1960	2,203	44.42%	2,756	55.56%	1	0.02%
1964	2,143	38.00%	3,485	61.80%	11	0.20%
1968	3,412	46.01%	3,355	45.25%	648	8.74%
1972	3,633	56.22%	2,711	41.95%	118	1.83%
1976	3,471	42.28%	4,583	55.83%	155	1.89%
1980	3,687	46.12%	4,177	52.25%	131	1.64%
1984	3,921	44.34%	4,848	54.82%	75	0.85%
1988	3,091	40.65%	4,461	58.67%	52	0.68%
1992	2,574	31.61%	4,839	59.43%	730	8.96%
1996	2,229	32.45%	3,913	56.97%	726	10.57%
2000	3,122	43.21%	3,951	54.68%	153	2.12%
2004	3,591	48.49%	3,761	50.78%	54	0.73%
2008	3,324	49.22%	3,278	48.54%	151	2.24%
2012	4,274	61.91%	2,473	35.82%	157	2.27%
2016	4,932	76.58%	1,335	20.73%	173	2.69%
2020	5,748	78.71%	1,503	20.58%	52	0.71%
2024	5,701	80.75%	1,316	18.64%	43	0.61%

== Communities ==
=== Towns ===
- Clinchco
- Clintwood
- Haysi

=== Census-designated place ===
- Dante (mostly in Russell County)

=== Other unincorporated communities ===
- Aily
- Bee
- Caney Ridge
- Darwin
- Lick Fork
- McClure
- Nora
- Sandlick
- Trammel
- Wakenva

== Notable people ==
- Brig. Gen. Gerald Childress (1930-2022), Army officer including 82nd Airborne, then superintendent of the New Mexico Military Institute
- Justin Hamilton, former NFL player for Washington Commanders, grew up in Clintwood.
- Darrell "Shifty" Powers, World War II (D-Day) veteran, Company E ("Easy Company") 506th Parachute Infantry Regiment, U.S. 101st Airborne Division, portrayed in the HBO miniseries Band of Brothers
- Trazel Silvers, former professional basketball player for the Harlem Globetrotters and in Europe.
- Ralph Stanley and Carter Stanley, The Stanley Brothers, bluegrass musicians

== See also ==
- Dickenson County Courthouse
- Dickenson County Sheriff's Office
- National Register of Historic Places listings in Dickenson County, Virginia
