= National Register of Historic Places listings in Russell County, Virginia =

Location of Russell County in Virginia

This is a list of the National Register of Historic Places listings in Russell County, Virginia.

This is intended to be a complete list of the properties and districts on the National Register of Historic Places in Russell County, Virginia, United States. The locations of National Register properties and districts for which the latitude and longitude coordinates are included below, may be seen in a Google map.

There are 11 properties and districts listed on the National Register in the county.

This National Park Service list is complete through NPS recent listings posted May 1, 2026.

== Current listings ==
	Name on the Register	Image	Date listed	Location	City or town	Description
1	Blackford Bridge	Blackford Bridge	June 24, 2010 (#10000381)	Chestnut Rd. 36°57′52″N 82°00′38″W	Lebanon	
2	Carter Hill	Carter Hill	January 28, 2000 (#00000023)	Fincastle Rd. 36°52′42″N 82°09′34″W	Lebanon	
3	Castlerun Historic District	Castlerun Historic District	January 28, 2000 (#00000024)	Castle Run Rd. 36°51′03″N 82°18′51″W	Castlewood	
4	Daugherty's Cave and Breeding Site		June 23, 1978 (#78003044)	Address Restricted	Lebanon	
5	Samuel Gilmer House	Samuel Gilmer House	February 17, 2015 (#15000019)	2410 E. Main St. 36°54′31″N 82°02′17″W	Lebanon	
6	Honaker Commercial Historic District	Honaker Commercial Historic District	December 23, 2009 (#09001159)	State Route 80; 37°00′58″N 81°58′29″W	Honaker	
7	Jessees Mill	Jessees Mill	January 20, 2005 (#04001543)	Jessees Mill, 2.5 miles (4.0 km) north of State Route 71; 36°54′50″N 82°10′04″W	Cleveland	
8	Mason-Dorton School	Mason-Dorton School	May 3, 2002 (#02000450)	State Route 71 at its junction with Moccasin Ridge Rd. 36°48′11″N 82°17′14″W	Castlewood	
9	Old Russell County Courthouse	Old Russell County Courthouse	July 16, 1973 (#73002059)	West of Dickensonville on U.S. Route 58 Alternate; 36°50′21″N 82°14′34″W	Dickensonville	
10	Stephen B. Quillen House	Stephen B. Quillen House	October 23, 2003 (#03001096)	149 Church St. 36°54′10″N 82°04′51″W	Lebanon	
11	Smithfield	Smithfield	August 16, 1994 (#94000988)	Northwestern side of U.S. Route 19, 3 miles (4.8 km) southwest of Rosedale; 36°56′31″N 81°57′48″W	Rosedale	

== See also ==
- List of National Historic Landmarks in Virginia
- National Register of Historic Places listings in Virginia
