= Virginia State Route 82 =

State highway in Russell County, Virginia, US

State Route 82
- SR 82 highlighted in red

Route information
- Maintained by VDOT
- Length: 6.84 mi (11.01 km)
- Existed: 1933–present

Major junctions
- West end: SR 600 / SR 661 in Cleveland
- East end: US 19 Bus. in Lebanon

Location
- Country: United States
- State: Virginia
- Counties: Russell

Highway system
- Virginia Routes; Interstate; US; Primary; Secondary; Byways; History; HOT lanes
← I-81	→ SR 83

State Route 82 (SR 82) is a primary state highway in central Russell County, Virginia, United States. Known as Cleveland Road for most of its length, the route runs 6.84 miles (11.01 km) from SR 600 (SR 600) and SR 661 (SR 661) in Cleveland to U.S. Route 19 Business (US 19 Business) in Lebanon, providing a mountain crossing connecting the two towns.

== Route description ==
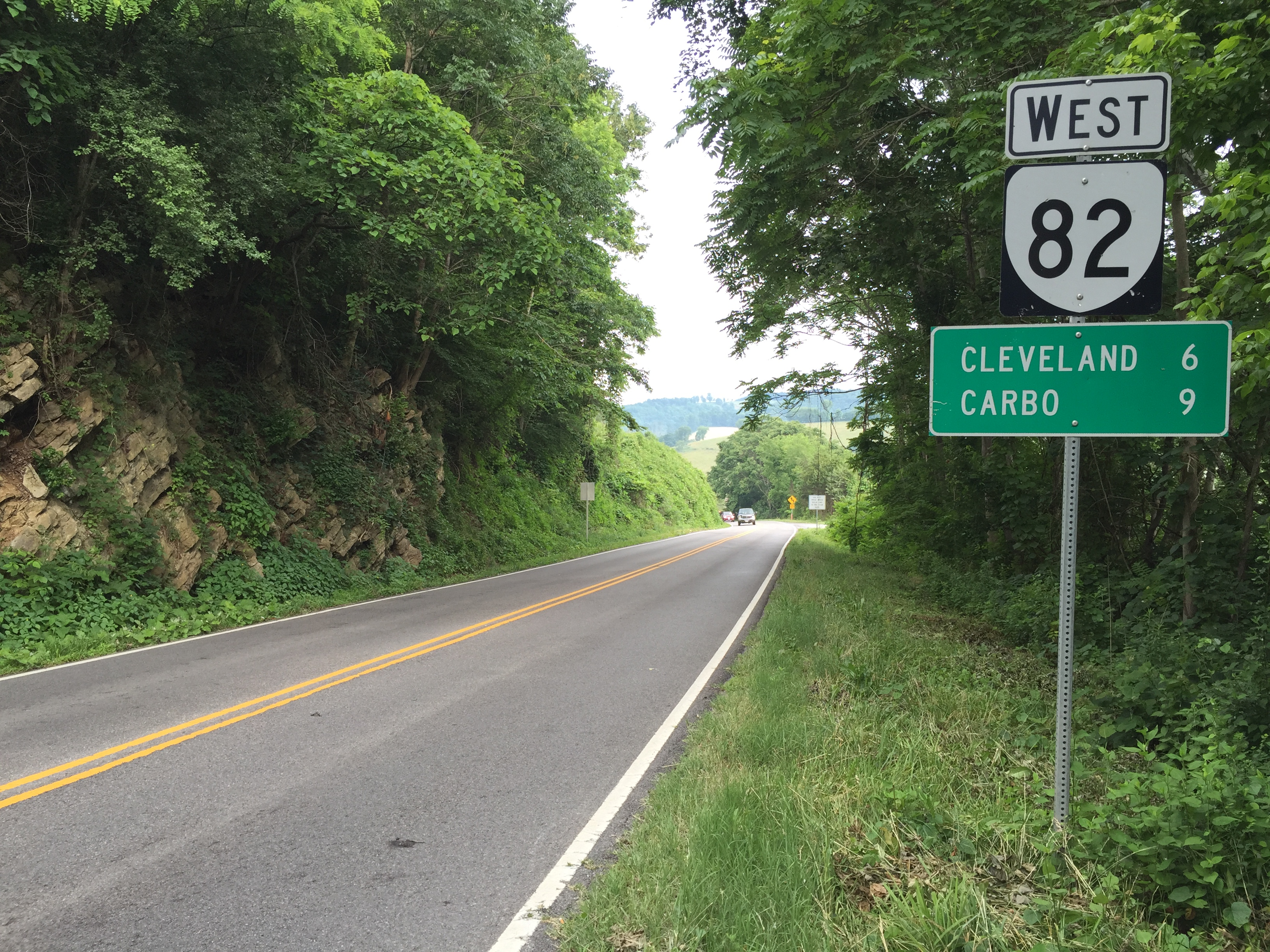
View west along SR 82 immediately northwest of Lebanon in June 2017

SR 82 begins at the junction of SR 600 (Ivy Ridge Road) and SR 661 (Ivy Ridge Road) on the west bank of the Clinch River in Cleaveland. From its western terminus SR 82 heads easterly (as a two-lane undivided road for its duration) on 1st Street to immediately cross over the river and then promptly turns northeast until it reaches Lebanon Avenue. The route then turns southeast on Lebanon Avenue and instantly crosses the Norfolk Southern Railway's Clinch Valley District tracks before passing through the central part of town. After leaving Cleveland the route follows an unnamed stream as it passes through the Cleveland Barrens Natural Area Preserve.

Continuing southeasterly as Cleveland Road, SR 82 crosses Reeds Valley before connecting with the north end of Jessees Mill Road (SR 645) and then west end of New Garden Road (also SR 645), both on the southeast edge of the valley. The route then begins its winding ascent of Copper Ridge, with several hairpin turns along the way. After reaching the crest of Copper Ridge (at just over 2,440 feet [740 m]), SR 82 begins its descent to Glade Hollow.

Before passing through the unincorporated community of Spring City, the route has a few more hairpin turns on its way down. Once in Spring City SR 82 connects with the west end of a section of SR 662. Halfway between Spring City and Glade Hollow, SR 82 connects with the east end of a section of SR 640 (which terminates at Jessees Road [SR 645]). Near its low point in Glade Hollow the route connects with the west end of another section of SR 645. On the southeast side of Glade Hollow, SR 82 climbs another, lower pass (less than 200 feet [61 m]) before dropping down into Lebanon. Once in town the route continues southerly (still as Cleveland Road) until it reaches its southern terminus at a T-intersection with Main Street (US 19 Business).

== History ==
All of SR 82 was added to the state highway system in 1932, and the number 82 was assigned in the 1933 renumbering.

== Major intersections ==
The entire route is in Russell County.

Location	mi	km	Destinations	Notes
Cleveland	0.00	0.00	SR 600 (Ivy Ridge Road) / SR 661 (Artrip Road) – Carbo	Western terminus
Cleveland			Bridge over the Clinch River	
			SR 645 south (Jessees Mill Road) – SR 71	
			SR 645 north (New Garden Road) – Honaker	
Spring City			SR 662 east – SR 742	
			SR 640 west – SR 636, Jessees Mill Road (SR 645)	
			SR 640 east – SR 652, SR 740	
Lebanon	6.84	11.01	US 19 Bus. (Main Street) – Bluefield, Bristol	Eastern terminus
1.000 mi = 1.609 km; 1.000 km = 0.621 mi

== See also ==
- List of state highways in Virginia
- List of highways numbered 82
