= WXLZ =

WXLZ may refer to:

- WXLZ-FM, a radio station (107.3 FM) licensed to serve Lebanon, Virginia, United States
- WHNQ (AM), a radio station (1140 AM) licensed to serve St. Paul, Virginia, which held the call sign WXLZ from 1992 to 2024
