= WHNQ (AM) =

Currently silent
- St. Paul, Virginia; United States
- Broadcast area: Lebanon, Virginia; Norton, Virginia; Castlewood, Virginia; Nickelsville, Virginia
- Frequency: 1140 kHz

Programming
- Affiliations: CBS Radio News; Mainstream Country (Westwood One)

Ownership
- Owner: Roger Bouldin; (Bouldin Radio, LLC)
- Sister stations: WXLZ-FM

History
- First air date: 1981
- Former call signs: WSPC (1980–1992); WXLZ (1992–2024)

Technical information
- Licensing authority: FCC
- Facility ID: 74348
- Class: D
- Power: 250 watts day
- Transmitter coordinates: 36°52′7.9″N 82°18′51.7″W

Links
- Public license information: Public file; LMS

WHNQ is a silent broadcast radio station licensed to St. Paul, Virginia, serving the Lebanon/Norton/Castlewood/Nickelsville area. WHNQ is owned and operated by Roger Bouldin, through licensee Bouldin Radio, LLC. On May 12, 2023, the FCC approved an application for the station to go silent due to financial reasons.
