= WXLZ-FM =

- Lebanon, Virginia; United States
- Broadcast area: Lebanon, Virginia; Abingdon, Virginia; Castlewood, Virginia
- Frequency: 107.3 MHz
- Branding: 107.3 WXLZ

Programming
- Format: Country
- Affiliations: ABC News Radio; Mainstream Country (Westwood One)

Ownership
- Owner: Roger Bouldin; (Bouldin Radio, LLC)
- Sister stations: WHNQ

History
- First air date: 1993

Technical information
- Licensing authority: FCC
- Facility ID: 74349
- Class: A
- Power: 1,000 watts
- HAAT: 236 meters (774 ft)
- Transmitter coordinates: 36°50′38.0″N 82°11′4.0″W

Links
- Public license information: Public file; LMS
- Webcast: WXLZ Webstream
- Website: WXLZ Online

WXLZ-FM is a Country-formatted broadcast radio station licensed to Lebanon, Virginia, serving the Lebanon/Abingdon/Castlewood area. WXLZ-FM is owned and operated by Roger Bouldin, through licensee Bouldin Radio, LLC.
