= Honaker Commercial Historic District =

Historic district in Virginia, United States

- U.S. National Register of Historic Places
- U.S. Historic district
- Virginia Landmarks Register
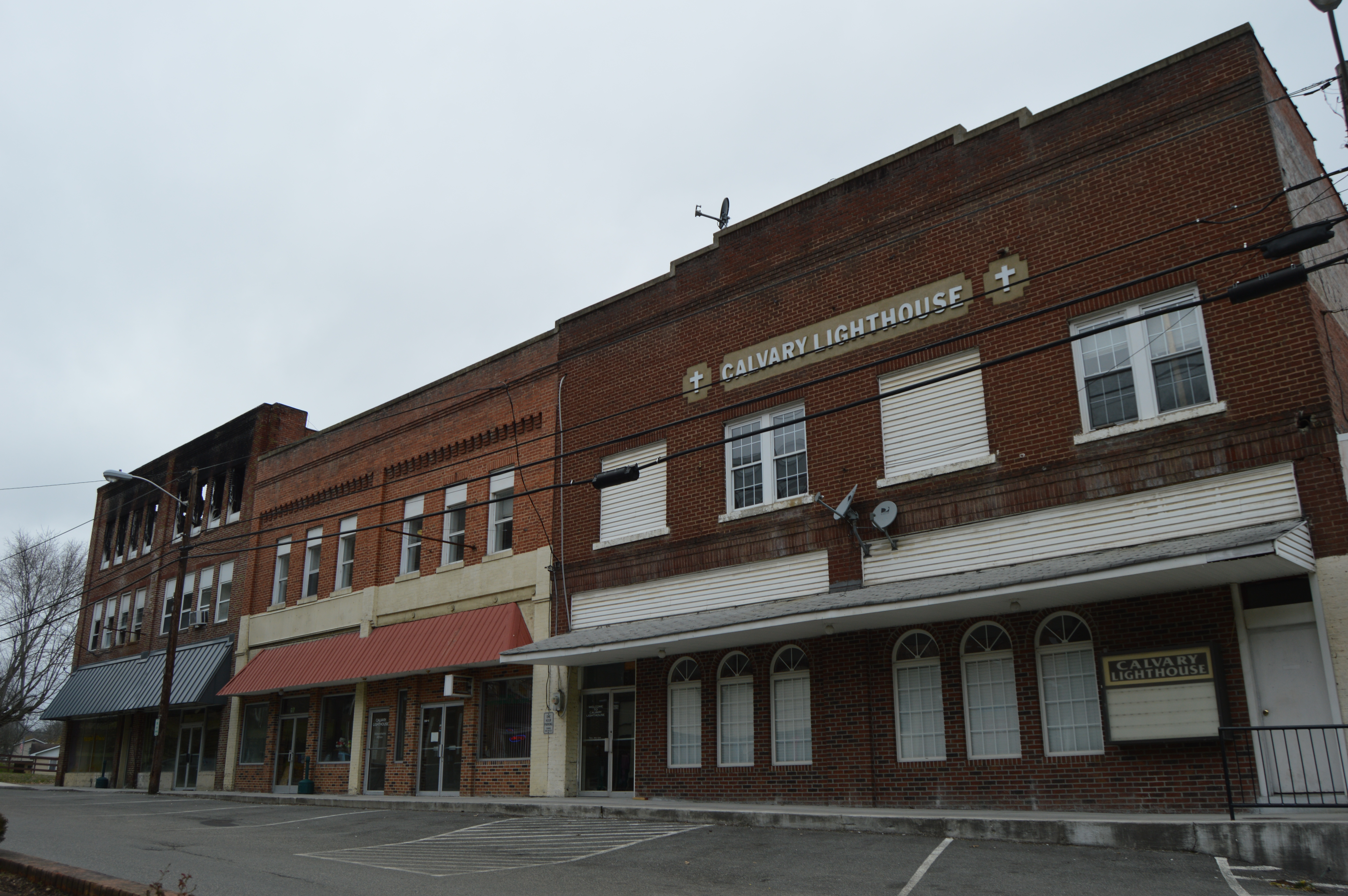
- Railroad Avenue

- Location within Virginia Location within the United States
- Location: State Route 80
- Coordinates: 37°0′58″N 81°58′31″W
- Area: 6.2 acres (2.5 ha)
- Built: 1895
- Architect: William Henry Haire; Ramey & Cross; Clayton Davis
- Architectural style: Late 19th And 20th Century Revivals, Late 19th And Early 20th Century American Movements
- NRHP reference No.: 09001159
- VLR No.: 239-5001

Significant dates
- Added to NRHP: December 23, 2009
- Designated VLR: September 17, 2009

The Honaker Commercial Historic District is a national historic district located at Honaker, Russell County, Virginia. The district encompasses 21 contributing buildings in the central business district of Honaker. Notable buildings include the Zed Slaughter Building (c. 1895), First National Bank (1915), Fuller Building (c. 1915), Honaker Harness and Saddle Shop and Commercial Hotel (c. 1908), E.J. Boyd, Sr. Building (c. 1915), Countiss Rebekah Masonic Lodge #31 (c. 1900), and the Hillman Professional Building (c. 1910).

It was listed on the National Register of Historic Places in 2009.
