= Honaker High School =

Public high school in Virginia, US

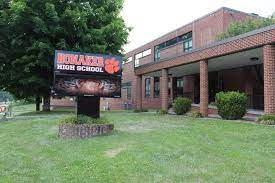

Location
- P.O. Box 764; 1795 Thompson Creek Road; Honaker, Virginia 24260; United States
- Coordinates: 37°1′7.18″N 81°59′11.96″W

Information
- School type: Public high school
- School district: Russell County School Division
- Superintendent: Gregory Brown
- Principal: Tony Bush
- Grades: 8–12
- Enrollment: 456 (2022-23)
- Language: English
- Colors: Orange, Black, White, Gray
- Athletics conference: VHSL Class 1 VHSL Region D VHSL Hogoheegee District
- Mascot: Tigers
- Rivals: Richlands High School, Lebanon High School
- Website: www.russell.k12.va.us/o/hhs

Honaker High School is a public high school located in Honaker, Virginia in Russell County, Virginia. Athletic teams compete in the Virginia High School League's Class 1 Black Diamond District in Region 1D.

== Extracurricular activities ==
As a member school of the Virginia High School League, all of Honaker High's extracurricular athletic and academic activities generally fall under the Region D's Hogoheegee District in the smallest public school size, "A" or "1A," depending on the activity.

=== Academic Team / Quiz Bowl ===
Since the creation of VHSL's Scholastic Bowl program, Honaker High's Academic Team has been a dominating force in Virginia's far western counties, winning 4 state championships, including back-to-back state titles in 2016 and 2017—a first in HHS and Russell County history for any VHSL-sanctioned team sport or activity. The team also finished as state runner-up in 2010, 2012, 2013, and 2018.

The Scholastic Bowl team won the Black Diamond District regular season and/or tournament seventeen consecutive times from 1998 to 2014. That streak also included over ten Region D Championships. They have never failed to qualify for a VHSL regional tournament in Scholastic Bowl's 22 year history, and have qualified for the VHSL State Tournament 17 times—more than any school in Class 1.

In 2014, the Scholastic Bowl team brought home its first 1A State Championship. Team captain Jacob Mitchell was also named to the All-State Team after laying claim to the program's single-season and career scoring records. The 2014 State Championship team posted a perfect 38-0 record, averaging more than 300 points per game, an average not reached by any of the teams prior or since.

The program won back-to-back state championships in 2016 and 2017, finished state runner-up in 2018, and as state champion again in 2019 while posting an undefeated 27-0 season record.

The 2017 team finished 41st out of 96 teams in the public school division of the NAQT Small School National Championship Tournament, with team captain Caleb Perkins finishing 19th individually out of the tournament's 533 players—the first top 20 individual finish at the national level for any Virginia high school player west of the New River Valley.

=== Baseball ===
The Honaker Tigers hosted the Virginia State quarterfinals baseball game for 2008. The team won over J.J. Kelly High School in the Region D Championship.

In 2011, Honaker won the Single-A Division II State Championship over J.J. Kelly High School by a score of 16-9.

=== Basketball ===
In 1924, Honaker won the state championship for boys basketball, defeating Dayton High 30-14. The championship, which came in the short-lived "C" division of the VHSL, is also the earliest recorded state title in VHSL boys basketball history.

In 2014, the Honaker Girls' Varsity Basketball team finished the season as VHSL Class 1 State Runner-up with a 60-34 loss to Chilhowie. The Varsity Girls' basketball team won VHSL Class 1 State Championships in 2020 (Co-Champions), 2021 and 2022. Declared Co-Champions (Surry County) in 2020 due to Covid-19, defeated Riverheads in 2021 and Buffalo Gap in 2022.

=== Football ===
The football team recorded state runner-up finishes in 2000 (a loss to King William High School 25-15) and 2012 (against George Wythe High School, 17-10).

The 2000 finish came on the back of Senior QB Heath Miller, who broke numerous school records as a passer but was also a formidable defensive back. Miller later won the 2004 John Mackey Award as the best TE in the nation while playing for the Virginia Cavaliers, followed by being drafted 30th overall by the Pittsburgh Steelers and immediately promoted to their starting position.

=== Forensics ===
In 1953, Honaker won the state championship for Girls' Public Speaking.

=== Softball ===
Honaker has won the VHSL state championship for softball twice. The first, in the former "A" division, came in 1988 with a 7-2 win over Northumberland High School. Two years earlier, the Tiger fastpitch finished runner-up in the championship game to William Monroe High School, 17-2. In 2013, the Tigers took the title to Russell County once again by securing a 3-1 victory in the 1-A state championship match against Madison County High School.

=== Theater ===
For the 1951-1952 school year, Honaker's theater program was awarded a superior rating by the VHSL.

== Notable alumni ==
- Heath Miller, Former American football tight end for the Virginia Cavaliers and the NFL Pittsburgh Steelers
- Jordan Stout, NFL punter, played for Penn State, drafted in the 4th round, 130th overall in the 2022 NFL Draft by the Baltimore Ravens
