= Virginia State Route 80 =

State highway in western Virginia, US

State Route 80

- SR 80 highlighted in red

Route information
- Maintained by VDOT
- Length: 67.37 mi (108.42 km)
- Existed: July 1, 1933–present
- Tourist routes: Virginia Byway

Major junctions
- West end: KY 80 near Elkhorn City, KY
- SR 83 in Haysi; US 19 at Rosedale; I-81 near Meadowview
- East end: US 11 / SR 803 near Meadowview

Location
- Country: United States
- State: Virginia
- Counties: Buchanan, Dickenson, Russell, Washington

Highway system
- Virginia Routes; Interstate; US; Primary; Secondary; Byways; History; HOT lanes
← SR 79	→ I-81

State Route 80 is a primary state highway in the southwest part of the U.S. state of Virginia. It runs from the Kentucky state line at Breaks Interstate Park east to U.S. Route 11 near Meadowview. Kentucky Route 80 and Missouri's Route 80 continue the number west to Matthews, Missouri. The entire length of SR 80 is part of U.S. Bicycle Route 76.

== Route description ==
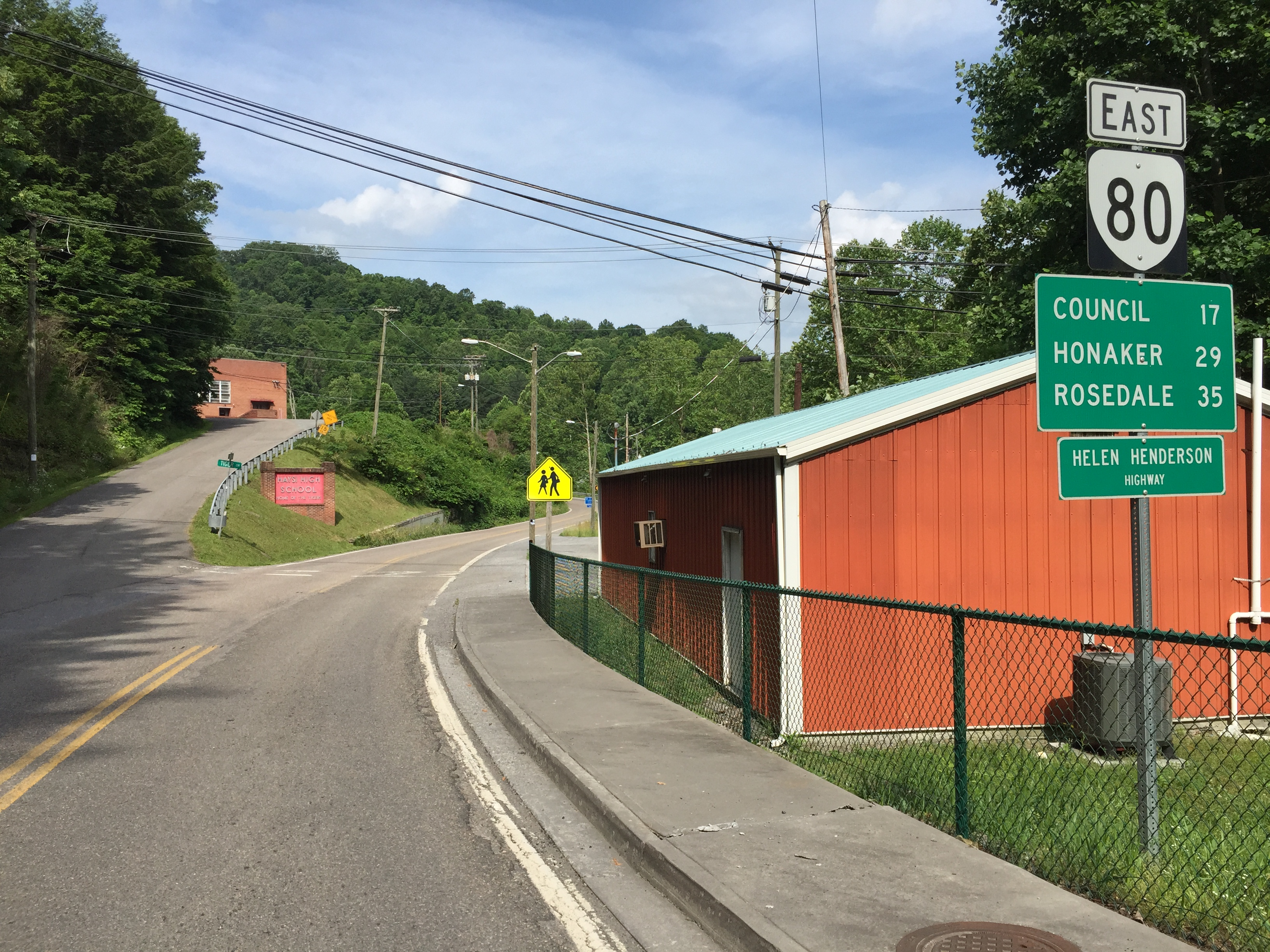
View east along SR 80 at SR 83 in Haysi

=== Buchanan and Dickenson counties ===
Kentucky Route 80 runs alongside the Russell Fork from Millard to just shy of the Virginia state line. There it turns northeasterly along the west bank of Grassy Creek, which lies inside Virginia and forms the line between Buchanan and Dickenson Counties, in order to avoid the deep gorge through Breaks Interstate Park. Route 80 soon crosses into Virginia, and continues to parallel Grassy Creek until the split with Hunts Creek, where it (and the county line) turns southeast to follow that creek. About halfway to the community of Breaks, SR 80 crosses the creek and county line.

SR 80 passes the community of Breaks, leaving Hunts Creek there and running past the entrance to Breaks Interstate Park. It runs south through Camp Branch Gap, and then continues in a general southerly direction alongside small creeks and over two summits to State Route 83 east of Haysi. SR 80 and SR 83 overlap west alongside Russell Prater Creek into Haysi, where they meet State Route 63 at the point where Russell Prater Creek empties into the Russell Fork. The two routes turn south, but SR 83 soon splits to the west to follow the McClure River. SR 80 continues southeasterly along the Russell Fork past Martha Gap and Birchleaf to the point where the Russell Fork turns east; SR 80 continues next to Fryingpan Creek past Colley, then alongside Priest Fork to Sportsman Lake and through Abner Gap to the Abner Branch, rejoining the Russell Fork at Bee.

SR 80 and the Russell Fork continue past Davenport and Council. The fork ends as the road approaches Sandy Ridge and the Tennessee Valley Divide, which it climbs Big A Mountain via a series of hairpin curves.

=== Russell County ===
SR 80 descends from Big A Mountain into a relatively flat area, where it runs cross-country and next to small creeks via Honaker, the junction with State Route 67, and a bridge over the Clinch River at Blackford to U.S. Route 19 at Rosedale. There it turns southwest with US 19, alongside Elk Garden Creek, to Smithfield, where it splits to the south. SR 80 again runs cross-country past Rockdell, where it begins to climb Clinch Mountain, which it crosses (into Washington County) at Hayters Gap.

=== Washington County ===
SR 80 descends from Hayters Gap to the East Fork Wolf Creek. There it turns southwest, following the creek to the community of Hayters Gap, and then following Wolf Creek through a gap in Little Mountain to the North Fork Holston River at the community of River Bridge. It crosses the river and follows Logan Creek uphill to Lindell, where the land levels out. It continues to follow Logan Creek past Yellow Springs and Giesley Mill, then crossing a low summit to Meadow View. SR 80 crosses Interstate 81 at a Diamond interchange southeast of Meadowview, providing access on I-81, and then ends at U.S. Route 11 at Cedarville. State Route 803, formerly part of SR 80, continues southeast from Cedarville to Lodi.

== History ==
The road from Lodi to Cedarville, now State Route 803, was planned as part of State Route 12, the predecessor to U.S. Route 58, in 1923. The next year, however, SR 12 was realigned to pass through Damascus, and the road from State Route 10 (now U.S. Route 11) at Cedarville towards Lodi for five miles (8 km) was added to the state highway system as State Route 125, a spur of SR 12. The next year it was extended southeast the rest of the way to SR 12 at Lodi and northwest 1.1 miles (1.8 km) to Meadowview.

Five miles (8 km) of road northwest from Meadowview and three miles (5 km) southeast from State Route 11 (now U.S. Route 19) near Rosedale were added to the state highway system in 1928 as State Route 111, and SR 125 was renumbered as part of SR 111 that same year. The gap was closed in 1930 and 1931.

== Major intersections ==
County	Location	mi	km	Destinations	Notes
Buchanan	Breaks Interstate Park	0.00	0.00	KY 80 west – Elkhorn City	Kentucky state line; western terminus
Dickenson				US 121 (Coalfields Expressway)	Proposed junction
Dickenson	Haysi	10.09	16.24	SR 83 east (Dickenson Highway) – Vansant, Grundy	West end of concurrency with SR 83
Dickenson	Haysi	11.18	17.99	SR 63 south (Haysi Main Street) – John Flannagan Dam	Northern terminus of SR 63
Dickenson	Haysi	11.52	18.54	SR 83 west (Dickenson Highway) – Clintwood, Pound	East end of concurrency with SR 83
Russell	Honaker	39.09	62.91	SR 67 north (Swords Creek Road) – Swords Creek	Southern terminus of SR 67
Russell	Rosedale	43.59	70.15	US 19 north – Tazewell, Bluefield	West end of concurrency with US 19
Russell	Smithfield	46.16	74.29	US 19 south – Lebanon, Bristol	East end of concurrency with US 19
Washington	Meadowview	66.54	107.09	I-81 – Roanoke, Bristol	I-81 exit 24
Washington	Cedarville	67.37	108.42	US 11 (Lee Highway) / SR 803 (Cedar Creek Road) – Chilhowie, Abingdon	Eastern terminus
1.000 mi = 1.609 km; 1.000 km = 0.621 mi: Concurrency terminus; Unopened

< SR 117	Spurs of SR 11; 1923–1928	SR 119 >
< SR 124	Spurs of SR 12; 1923–1928	none
< SR 110	District 1 State Routes; 1928–1933	SR 112 >
< SR 124	District 1 State Routes; 1928–1933	SR 126 >
