= Daugherty's Cave and Breeding Site =

Archaeological site in Virginia, United States

- U.S. National Register of Historic Places
- Nearest city: Lebanon, Virginia
- Area: 7 acres (2.8 ha)
- NRHP reference No.: 78003044
- Added to NRHP: June 23, 1978

Daugherty's Cave and Breeding Site are two adjacent Native American archaeological sites in Russell County, Virginia, near Lebanon. The Breeding Site includes materials dating from the Early Archaic Period (8000 to 6000 BC) while Daugherty's Cave contains artifacts dating from the late Archaid Period to the time of European contact. Digs at Daugherty's Cave have recovered large numbers of animal bones dating from the Middle Archaic Period including those of the Ivory-billed Woodpecker as well as stone tools, ceramic potsherds, charred plant matter, and features from a hearth.

The site was listed on the National Register of Historic Places in 1978.

== See also ==
- National Register of Historic Places listings in Russell County, Virginia
