= Willis, Virginia =

Willis, Virginia can refer to:

- Willis, Floyd County, Virginia
- Willis, Russell County, Virginia
