= Samuel Gilmer House =

Historic house in Virginia, United States

- U.S. National Register of Historic Places
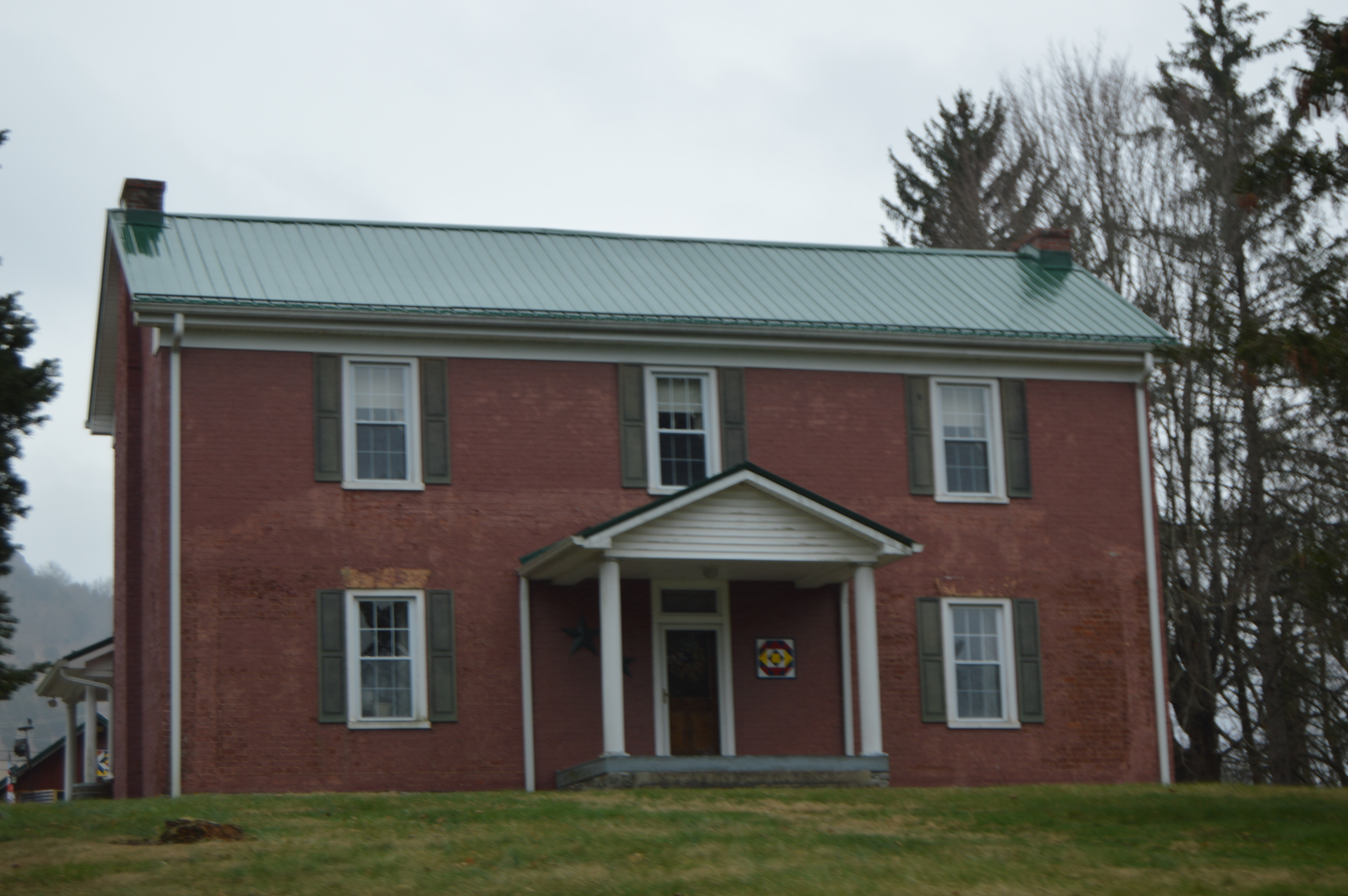
- Front of the house

- Location within Virginia Location within the United States
- Location: 2410 E. Main St., near Lebanon, Virginia
- Coordinates: 36°54′31″N 82°2′17″W
- Area: 1.57 acres (0.64 ha)
- Built: 1820
- Architectural style: Federal
- NRHP reference No.: 15000019
- Added to NRHP: February 17, 2015

The Samuel Gilmer House is a historic house and farm property at 2410 East Main Street, just outside the Lebanon town limits in Russell County, Virginia, United States. It is a two-story brick building, set on a limestone foundation, with a side gable roof. A single-story porch extends across the front, supported by round columns. The front is three bays wide, with a center entrance topped by a transom window. The interior follows a typical center-hall plan, and has much original Federal-period finish, including the staircase and fireplace mantels. The property includes the ruins of an 1848 covered bridge that once spanned Big Cedar Creek. Built about 1820, it is one of the few Federal period houses to survive in southwestern Virginia.

The house was listed on the National Register of Historic Places in 2015.

== See also ==
- National Register of Historic Places listings in Russell County, Virginia
