= VA82 =

VA-82 has the following meanings:

- Attack Squadron 82 (U.S. Navy)
- State Route 82 (Virginia)
