= Jordan Stout =

American football player (born 1998)

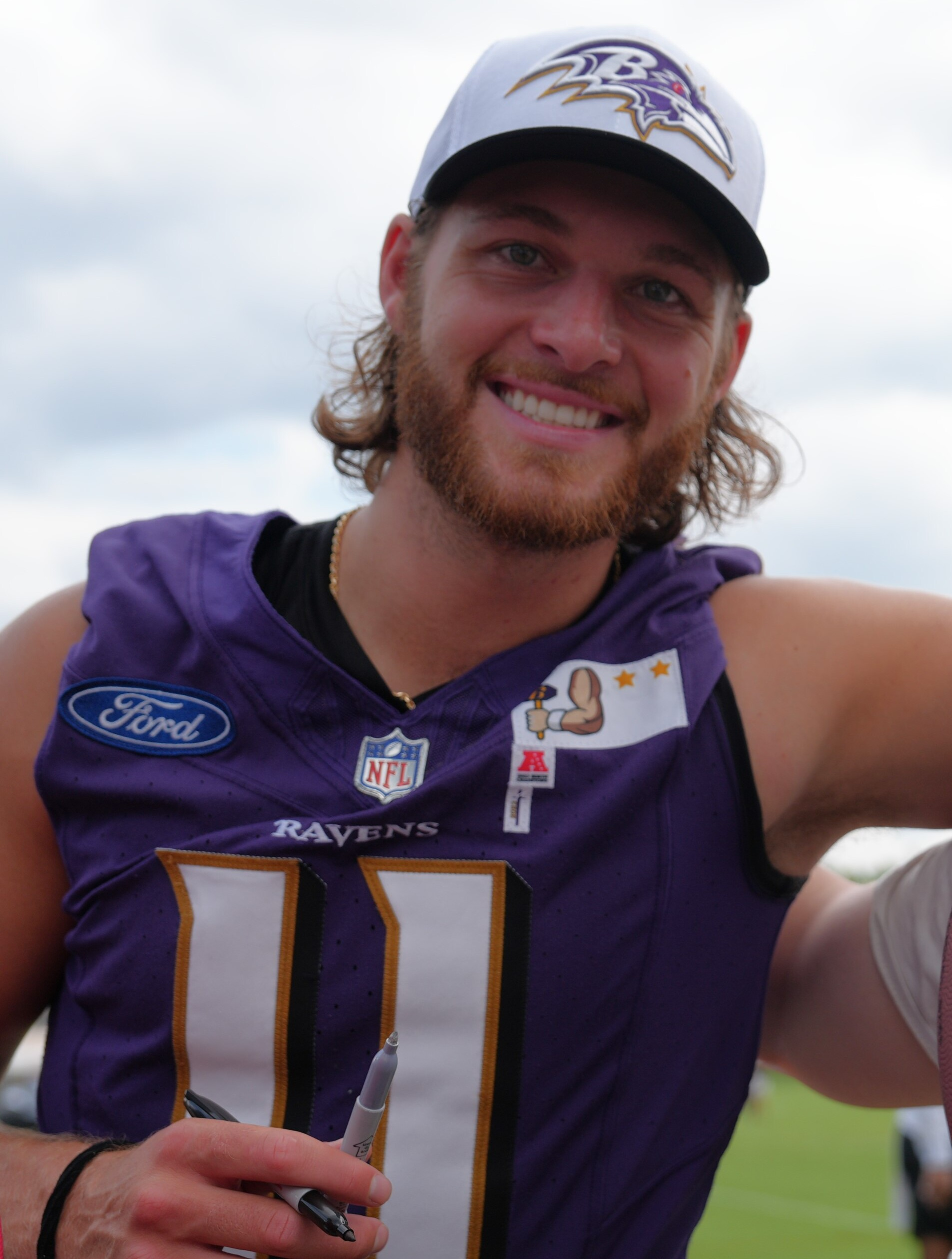
- Stout with the Baltimore Ravens in 2024

No. 15 – New York Giants
- Position: Punter
- Roster status: Active

Personal information
- Born: August 4, 1998 (age 28); Abingdon, Virginia, U.S.
- Listed height: 6 ft 3 in (1.91 m)
- Listed weight: 214 lb (97 kg)

Career information
- High school: Honaker (Honaker, Virginia)
- College: Virginia Tech (2017–2018); Penn State (2019–2021)
- NFL draft: 2022: 4th round, 130th overall pick

Career history
- Baltimore Ravens (2022–2025); New York Giants (2026–present)

Awards and highlights
- First-team All-Pro (2025); Pro Bowl (2025); Big Ten Punter of the Year (2021); First-team All-Big Ten (2021)

Career NFL statistics as of Week 10, 2026
- Punts: 269
- Punting yards: 12,916
- Average punt: 48.0
- Longest punt: 78
- Inside 20: 119
- Stats at Pro Football Reference

Jordan Connor Stout (born August 4, 1998) is an American professional football punter for the New York Giants of the National Football League (NFL). He played college football for the Virginia Tech Hokies and Penn State Nittany Lions.

== Early life ==
Stout grew up in Honaker, Virginia and attended Honaker High School. He was a three time All-State selection at kicker. Stout was named the Tigers' team MVP as a senior after making all nine of his field goal attempts and averaging 47 yards per punt.

== College career ==
=== Virginia Tech ===
Stout began his college career at Virginia Tech and redshirted his true freshman season after joining the team as a walk-on. As a redshirt freshman, Stout served as a kickoff specialist for the Hokies and recorded 60 touchbacks on 71 kickoff attempts. After the end of the season, Stout entered the NCAA transfer portal.

=== Penn State ===
Stout committed to transfer to Penn State, who offered him an athletic scholarship.

Stout was eligible to play immediately at Penn State because he was not a scholarship player at Virginia Tech. He served primarily as the Nittany Lions kickoff specialist in his first season with the team and finished fourth in the FBS with 66 touchbacks and made two of three field goal attempts, including a school record 57-yard field goal against Pittsburgh. As a redshirt junior, Stout was named Penn State's punter in addition to kickoffs and averaged 41.5 yards per punt. He was named Penn State's kicker entering his redshirt senior season and became the first player to handle kickoffs, field goals, and punts for the team since Chris Bahr in 1975. Stout punted 67 times for 3,083 yards with a 46.0 yard average and was named first-team All-Big Ten Conference and the Eddleman–Fields Punter of the Year. He also made 16 of 23 field goal attempts and 34 of 36 extra point attempts. Following the end of the season, Stout declared that he would enter the 2022 NFL draft.

== Professional career ==
Pre-draft measurables
Height	Weight	Arm length	Hand span	Wingspan	40-yard dash	10-yard split	20-yard split
6 ft 3 1/4 in (1.91 m)	209 lb (95 kg)	31 3/8 in (0.80 m)	9 3/8 in (0.24 m)	6 ft 3 1/2 in (1.92 m)	4.65 s	1.54 s	2.71 s
All values from NFL Combine

=== Baltimore Ravens ===
Stout was selected by the Baltimore Ravens in the fourth round, 130th overall, of the 2022 NFL draft. He was slated to be the new starter after the retirement of long time punter Sam Koch.

On November 23, 2025, in a game against the New York Jets, Stout delivered a 74-yard punt, matching the franchise record, also held by Sam Koch. He also posted a 61.5-yard average across four punts, marking the sixth-highest single-game average in NFL history since 1960.

=== New York Giants ===
On March 13, 2026, Stout signed a three-year, $12.3 million contract with the New York Giants, making him the highest-paid punter in the NFL.

== NFL career statistics ==
Legend
	Led the league
**Bold**	Career high

=== Regular season ===
Year	Team	GP	Punting							
Year	Team	GP	Punts	Yds	Lng	Avg	Net Avg	Blk	Ins20	RetY
2022	BAL	17	57	2,618	69	45.9	40.1	0	26	155
2023	BAL	17	**66**	**3,158**	67	47.8	39.1	**1**	**28**	**436**
2024	BAL	17	55	2,551	70	46.4	41.2	0	22	164
2025	BAL	17	53	2,657	**74**	**50.1**	**44.9**	0	24	159
2026	NYG	9	38	1,932	78	50.8	43.7	0	19	212
Career		77	269	12,916	78	48.0	41.5	1	119	1,126

=== Postseason ===
Year	Team	GP	Punting							
Year	Team	GP	Punts	Yds	Lng	Avg	Net Avg	Blk	Ins20	RetY
2022	BAL	1	3	142	53	**47.3**	**44.3**	0	2	9
2023	BAL	2	**9**	**420**	**66**	46.7	37.2	0	**4**	**85**
2024	BAL	2	4	183	49	45.8	37.3	0	1	14
Career		5	16	745	66	46.6	38.6	0	7	108
