= Old Russell County Courthouse =

Historic courthouse in Virginia, US

- U.S. National Register of Historic Places
- Virginia Landmarks Register
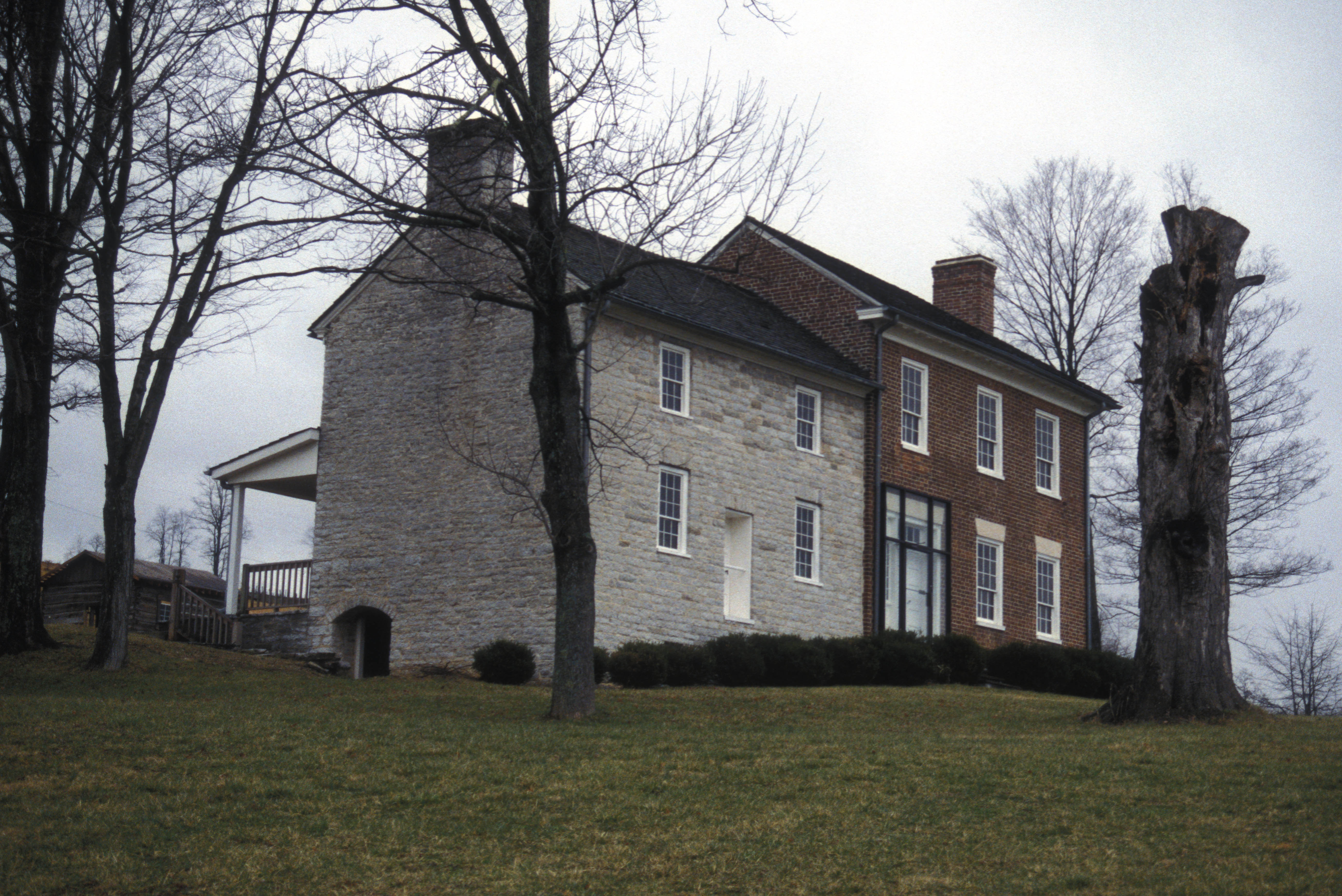
- Old Russell County Courthouse, April 1971

- Location within Virginia Location within the United States
- Interactive map showing the location of Old Russell County Courthouse
- Location: W of Dickensonville on U.S. 58A, near Dickensonville, Virginia
- Coordinates: 36°50′26″N 82°14′16″W
- Area: 9.9 acres (4.0 ha)
- Built: c. 1799
- NRHP reference No.: 73002059
- VLR No.: 083-0001

Significant dates
- Added to NRHP: July 16, 1973
- Designated VLR: June 19, 1973

Old Russell County Courthouse, also known as the Dickenson-Fugate House, is a historic courthouse building located near Dickensonville, Russell County, Virginia. It consists of a simple stone court house built about 1799, attached to the side of a more sophisticated brick farmhouse, which probably dates from the second quarter of the 19th century. Both sections are two stories and three bays wide and the brick section has a rear ell. It served as the second location for the Russell County courthouse, until the county seat moved to Lebanon in 1818.

It was listed on the National Register of Historic Places in 1973.
