= Bee, Virginia =

Unincorporated community in Virginia, United States

- Unincorporated community
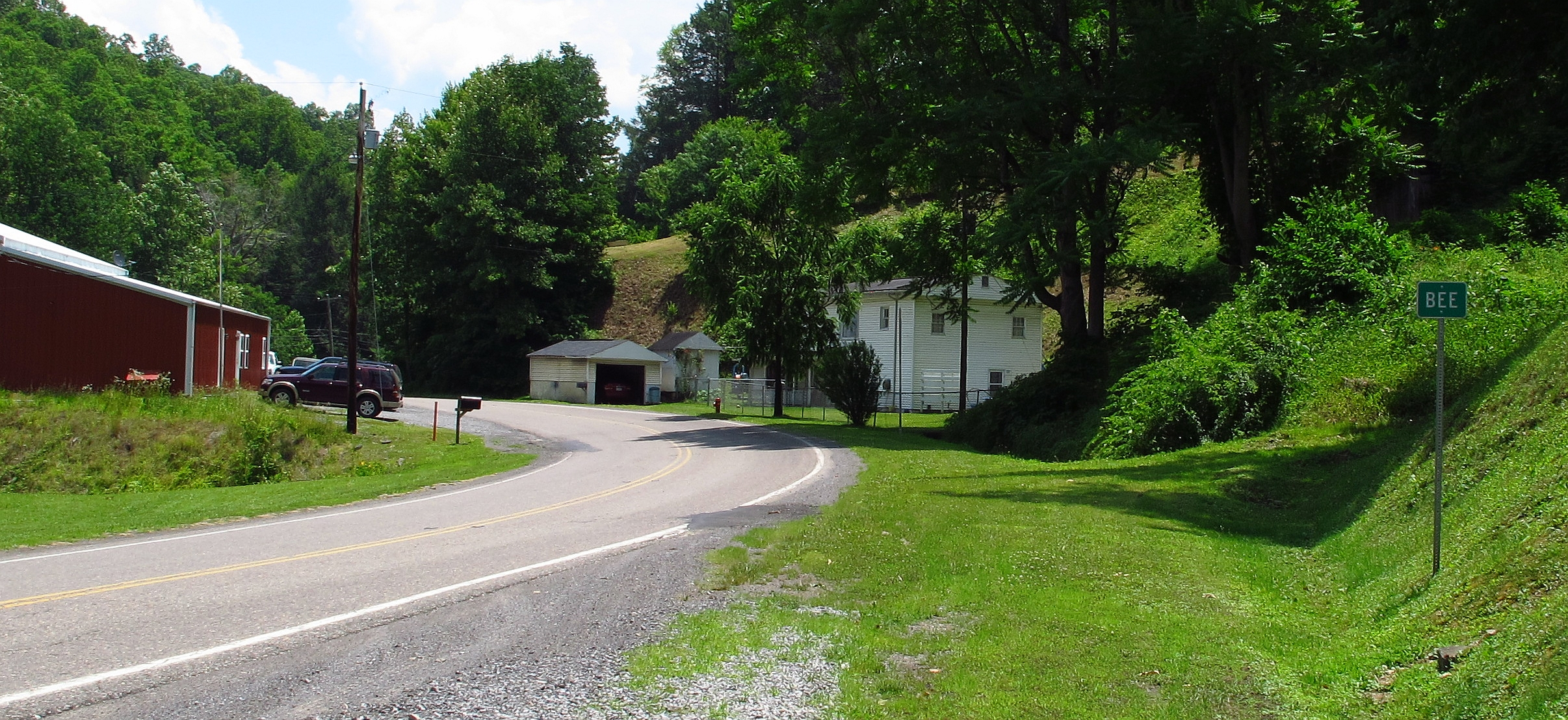
- Bee, Virginia, in 2014

- Location within Virginia Location within the United States
- Coordinates: 37°06′54″N 82°10′19″W
- Country: United States
- State: Virginia
- County: Dickenson
- Elevation: 1,444 ft (440 m)
- Time zone: UTC-5 (Eastern (EST))
  - Summer (DST): UTC-4 (EDT)
- ZIP code: 24217
- Area code: 276
- GNIS feature ID: 1492538

Bee is an unincorporated community in Dickenson County, Virginia, United States. Bee is located along the Russell Fork and Virginia State Route 80, 9.2 miles (14.8 km) southeast of Haysi. Bee had a post office until it closed on October 1, 2005; it still has its own ZIP code, 24217.

Bee was named for Beatrice Owens.
