= Drill, Virginia =

Unincorporated community in Virginia, United States

Coordinates: 37.0970553°N 81.9992939°W

Drill is an unincorporated community in Russell and Buchanan counties, Virginia, United States.

== History ==
A post office called Drill was established in 1908, and remained in operation until 1963. The origin of the name "Drill" is obscure.
