= Mason-Dorton School =

- Mason–Dorton School
- U.S. National Register of Historic Places
- Virginia Landmarks Register
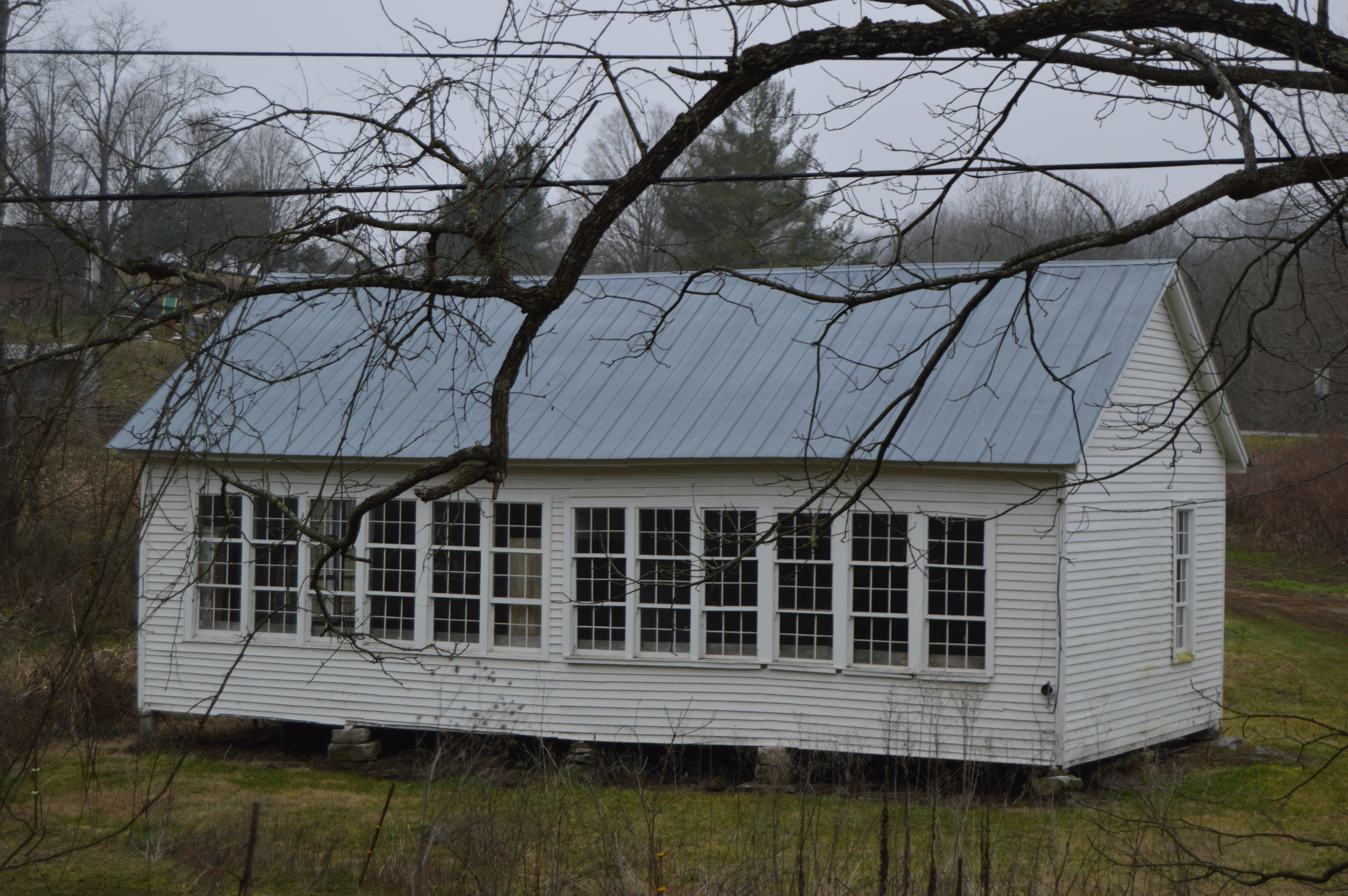
- Roadside view of the school

- Location within Virginia Location within the United States
- Location: State Route 71 at its junction with Moccasin Ridge Road, south of Castlewood, Virginia
- Coordinates: 36°48′10″N 82°17′14″W
- Area: 5.5 acres (2.2 ha)
- Built: 1885
- NRHP reference No.: 02000450
- VLR No.: 083-5019

Significant dates
- Added to NRHP: May 3, 2002
- Designated VLR: June 13, 2001

Mason–Dorton School, also known as Mason's Store School and Dorton School, is a historic school building located at Castlewood, Russell County, Virginia. It was built in 1885, and is a one-story, two-room, frame building. It measures approximately 46 feet by 24 feet. The school has a gable roof and is sheathed in weatherboard. The school closed in 1958.

It was listed on the National Register of Historic Places in 2002.
