= Davenport, Virginia =

Unincorporated community in Virginia, United States

- Unincorporated community
- Location within Virginia Location within the United States
- Coordinates: 37°06′02″N 82°08′12″W
- Country: United States
- State: Virginia
- County: Buchanan
- Elevation: 1,453 ft (443 m)
- Time zone: UTC-5 (Eastern (EST))
  - Summer (DST): UTC-4 (EDT)
- ZIP code: 24239
- Area code: 276
- GNIS feature ID: 1492840

Davenport is an unincorporated community in Buchanan County, Virginia, United States. Davenport is located along Virginia State Route 80, 12.5 miles (20.1 km) south of Grundy. Davenport has a post office with ZIP code 24239.

The Davenport post office was established in 1881. William Davenport was an early postmaster, for whom the town was named.
