= Carter Hill (Lebanon, Virginia) =

Historic house in Virginia, United States

- U.S. National Register of Historic Places
- Virginia Landmarks Register
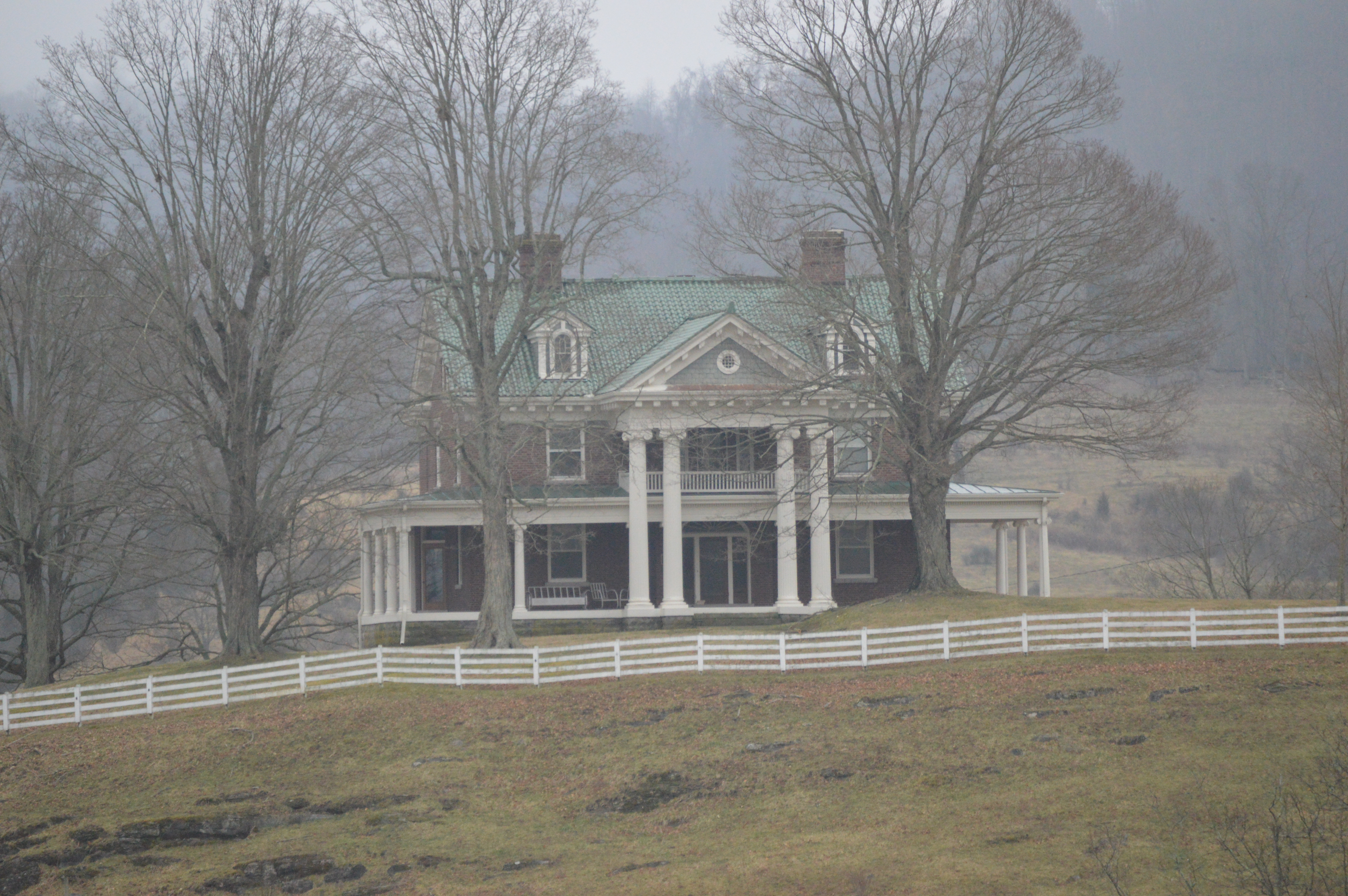
- Distant view from the north

- Location within Virginia Location within the United States
- Location: State Route 71 near Lebanon, Virginia
- Coordinates: 36°52′41″N 82°09′33″W
- Area: 246.2 acres (99.6 ha)
- Built: 1921-1922
- Built by: W.H. Musser and Son
- Architectural style: Colonial Revival
- NRHP reference No.: 00000023
- VLR No.: 083-5012

Significant dates
- Added to NRHP: January 28, 2000
- Designated VLR: December 1, 1999

Carter Hill is a historic home located near Lebanon, Russell County, Virginia. It was built in 1921–1922 for Dale Carter Lampkin and his widowed brother-in-law William Wallace Bird. The hilltop manor house was initially the seat of a 1,000 acre farm, now reduced to about 250 acres. The tall two-story, brick sheathed frame includes three bays and was built in the Colonial Revival style with Flemish bond brick veneer.

The side gable roof features green-glazed terra cotta tiles and pedimented and hipped dormer windows. It also has a projecting temple-fronted center bay, a hipped ell and several rear shed wings.

The front facade features a two-story pedimented portico supported by monumental cast iron columns with fluted shafts and Ionic order capitals. Also on the property is a contributing family cemetery. It was listed on the National Register of Historic Places in 2000.
