= Rosedale, Virginia =

- Unincorporated community
- Location within Virginia Location within the United States
- Coordinates: 36°57′33″N 81°55′52″W
- Country: United States
- State: Virginia
- County: Russell
- Elevation: 2,267 ft (691 m)
- Time zone: UTC-5 (Eastern (EST))
  - Summer (DST): UTC-4 (EDT)
- ZIP code: 24280
- Area code: 276
- GNIS feature ID: 1494263

Rosedale is an unincorporated community in Russell County, Virginia, United States. Rosedale is located at the junction of U.S. Route 19 and Virginia State Route 80, 4.6 miles (7.4 km) south-southeast of Honaker. The community was founded in 1819. Rosedale has a post office with ZIP code 24280, which opened on February 26, 1897. Rosedale was named for the area's Rosedale Plantation; the plantation was either named after the couple who owned the property or named for a "rose valley". The community has also been known as Elway and Oaks Garage, the latter name coming from a service station in the settlement.

Smithfield was listed on the National Register of Historic Places in 1994.
