= Stephen B. Quillen House =

Historic house in Virginia, United States

- U.S. National Register of Historic Places
- Virginia Landmarks Register
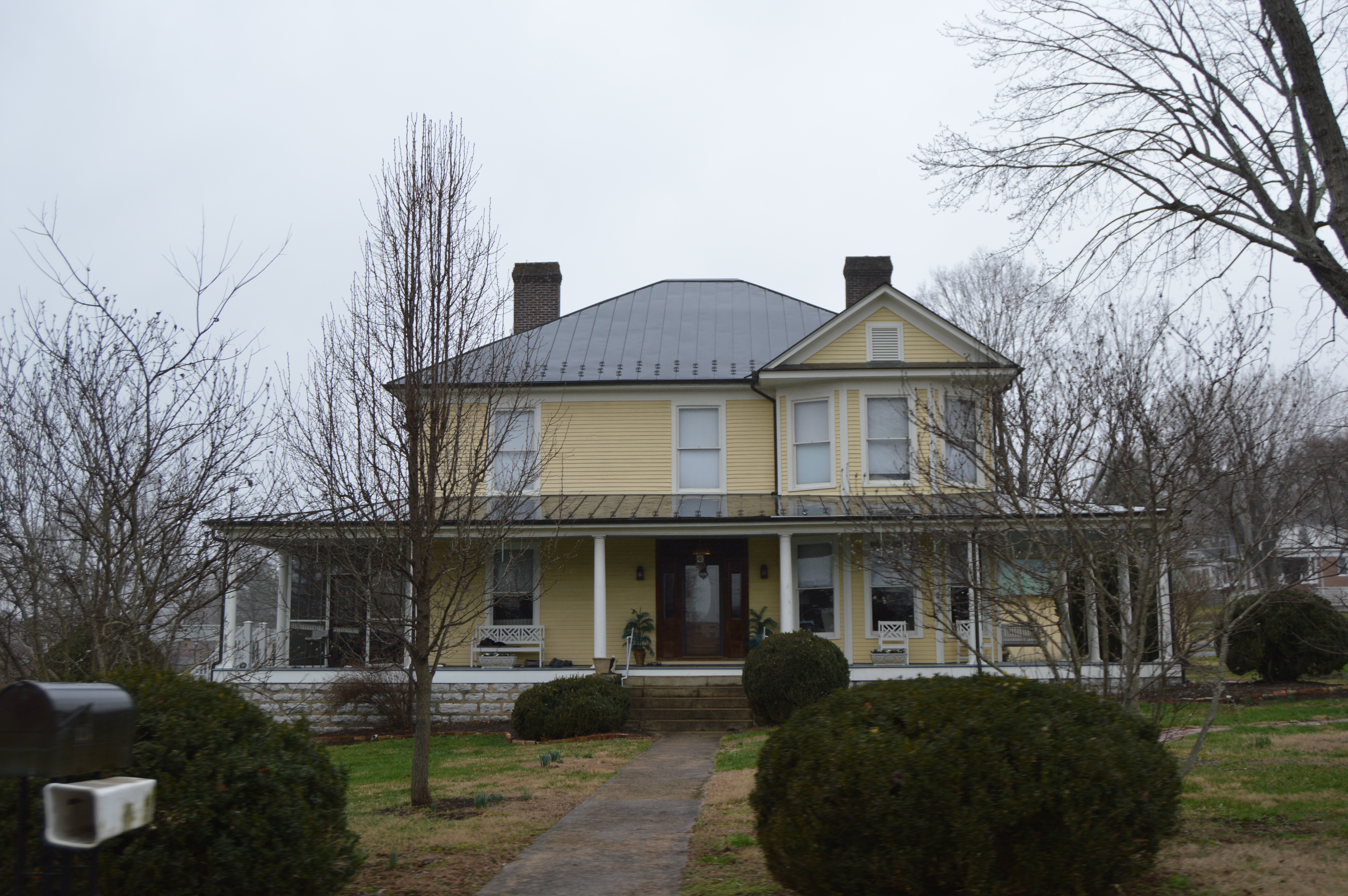
- Front of the house

- Location within Virginia Location within the United States
- Location: 149 Church St., Lebanon, Virginia
- Coordinates: 36°54′10″N 82°4′51″W
- Area: Less than 1 acre (0.40 ha)
- Built: 1912
- Architect: Nathan W. Easterly
- Architectural style: Queen Anne
- NRHP reference No.: 03001096
- VLR No.: 252-5016

Significant dates
- Added to NRHP: October 23, 2003
- Designated VLR: June 18, 2003

The Stephen B. Quillen House is a historic home located at Lebanon, Russell County, Virginia. It was built in 1912, and is a two-story, frame Queen Anne style dwelling. It has a steep hipped roof with lower cross gables, a wraparound first floor porch, and simple door and window treatment.

It was listed on the National Register of Historic Places in 2003.
