= Blackford Bridge =

- U.S. National Register of Historic Places
- Virginia Landmarks Register
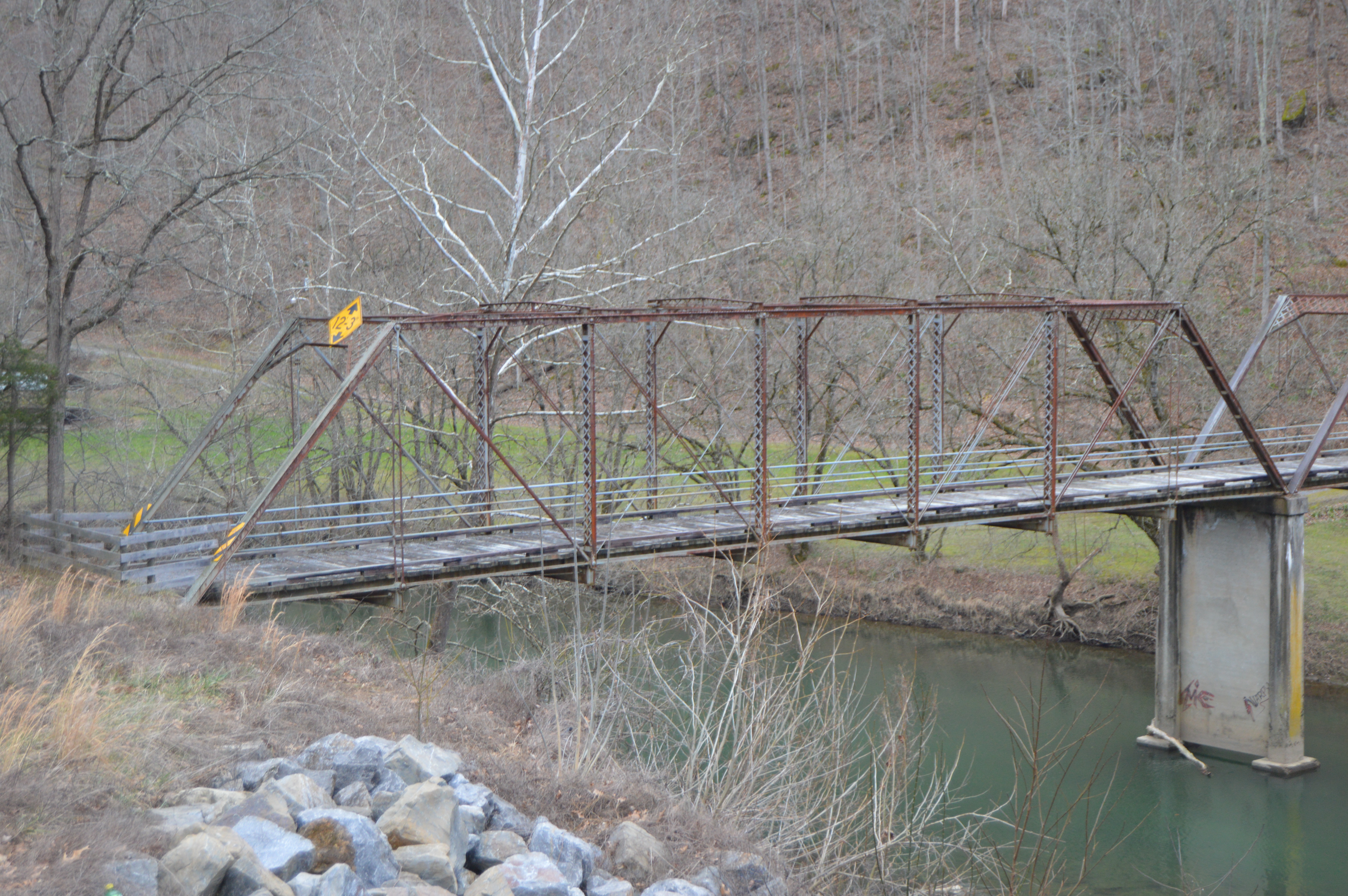
- Northern section of the bridge

- Location within Virginia Location within the United States
- Location: Chestnut Rd. (County Road 652), near Lebanon, Virginia
- Coordinates: 36°57′52″N 82°00′38″W
- Area: less than one acre
- Built: 1889
- Architect: Groton Bridge and Manufacturing Company
- Architectural style: Pratt through truss
- NRHP reference No.: 10000381
- VLR No.: 083-0060

Significant dates
- Added to NRHP: June 24, 2010
- Designated VLR: March 18, 2010

Blackford Bridge, also known as Pucketts Hole Bridge, is a historic Pratt through truss bridge located near Lebanon, Russell County, Virginia. It was built by the Groton Bridge Company in 1889. It crosses the Clinch River and is a two-span bridge, measuring over 220 feet (67 m) long.

The bridge was listed on the National Register of Historic Places in 2010.

== See also ==
- List of bridges on the National Register of Historic Places in Virginia
