= Castlerun Historic District =

Historic church in Virginia, United States

- U.S. National Register of Historic Places
- U.S. Historic district
- Virginia Landmarks Register
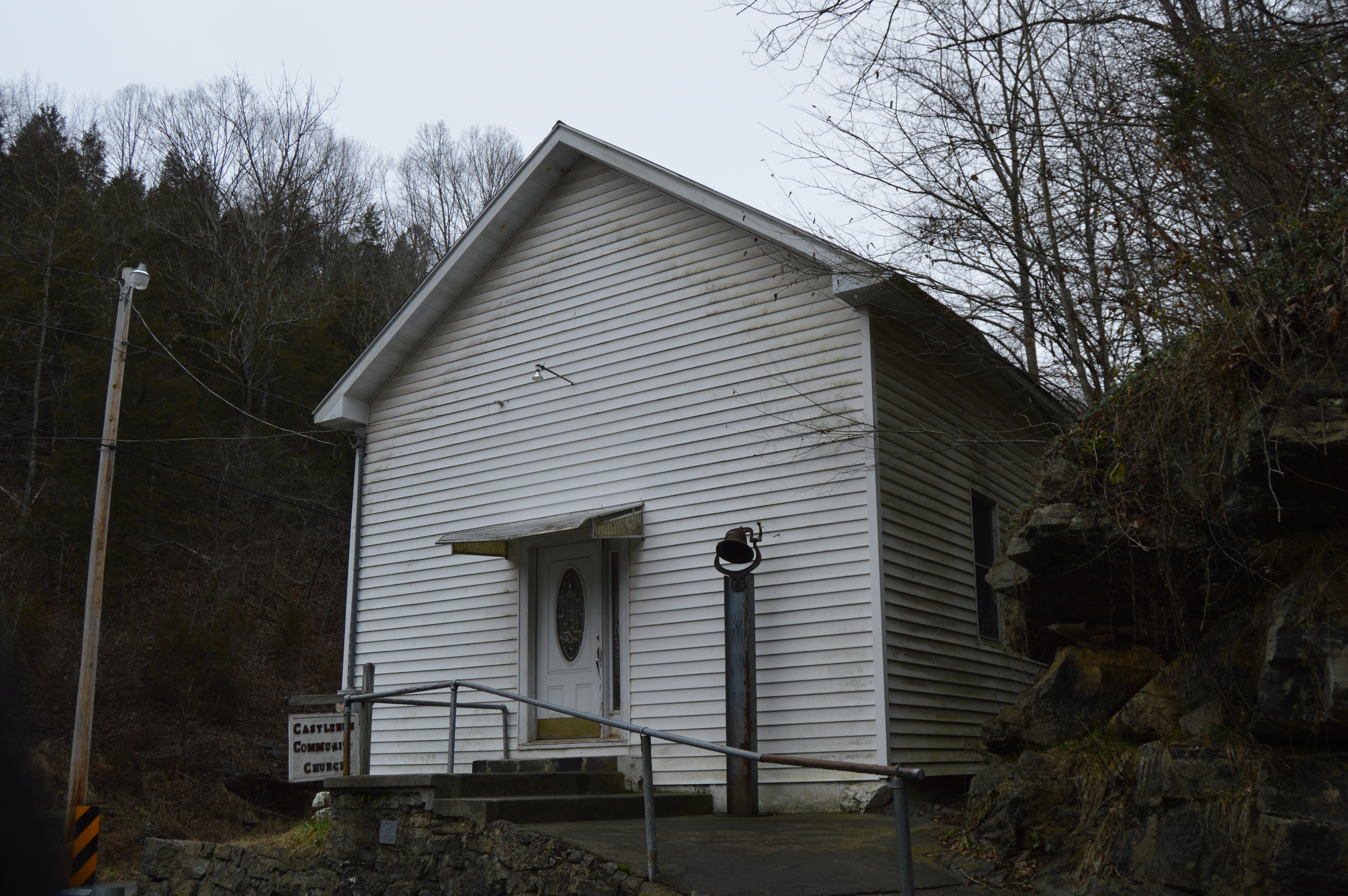
- Church

- Location within Virginia Location within the United States
- Location: Rte. 682, near Castlewood, Virginia
- Coordinates: 36°51′3″N 82°18′52″W
- Area: less than one acre
- Built: 1895
- NRHP reference No.: 00000024
- VLR No.: 083-5017

Significant dates
- Added to NRHP: January 28, 2000
- Designated VLR: December 1, 1999

Castlerun Historic District is a national historic district located at Castlerun near Castlewood, Russell County, Virginia, United States. The district encompasses three contributing buildings that served the spiritual, educational, and social needs of this isolated far southwest Virginia community. They are the Castlerun School (c. 1895), the Castle Run Missionary Baptist Church (1924), and a frame privy (1926). The one-room school and church are frame, weatherboarded, rectangular buildings with a steep gable roofs. The school closed in 1951.

It was listed on the National Register of Historic Places in 2000.
