= Dickensonville, Virginia =

Unincorporated community in Virginia, US

Coordinates: 36°50′30″N 82°13′25″W

Dickensonville is a small unincorporated community at the junction of U.S. Route 58 Alternate and State Route 71 in Russell County, Virginia, United States. Located approximately midway between Lebanon and Saint Paul, Dickensonville was locally known as Old Court House, since it is the location of the Old Russell County Courthouse. This name also found its way into the 1918 law describing state highways in Virginia. The community served as the county seat from 1786 until 1818 when it moved to Lebanon.
