= Jessees Mill =

- Jessee’s Mill
- U.S. National Register of Historic Places
- Virginia Landmarks Register
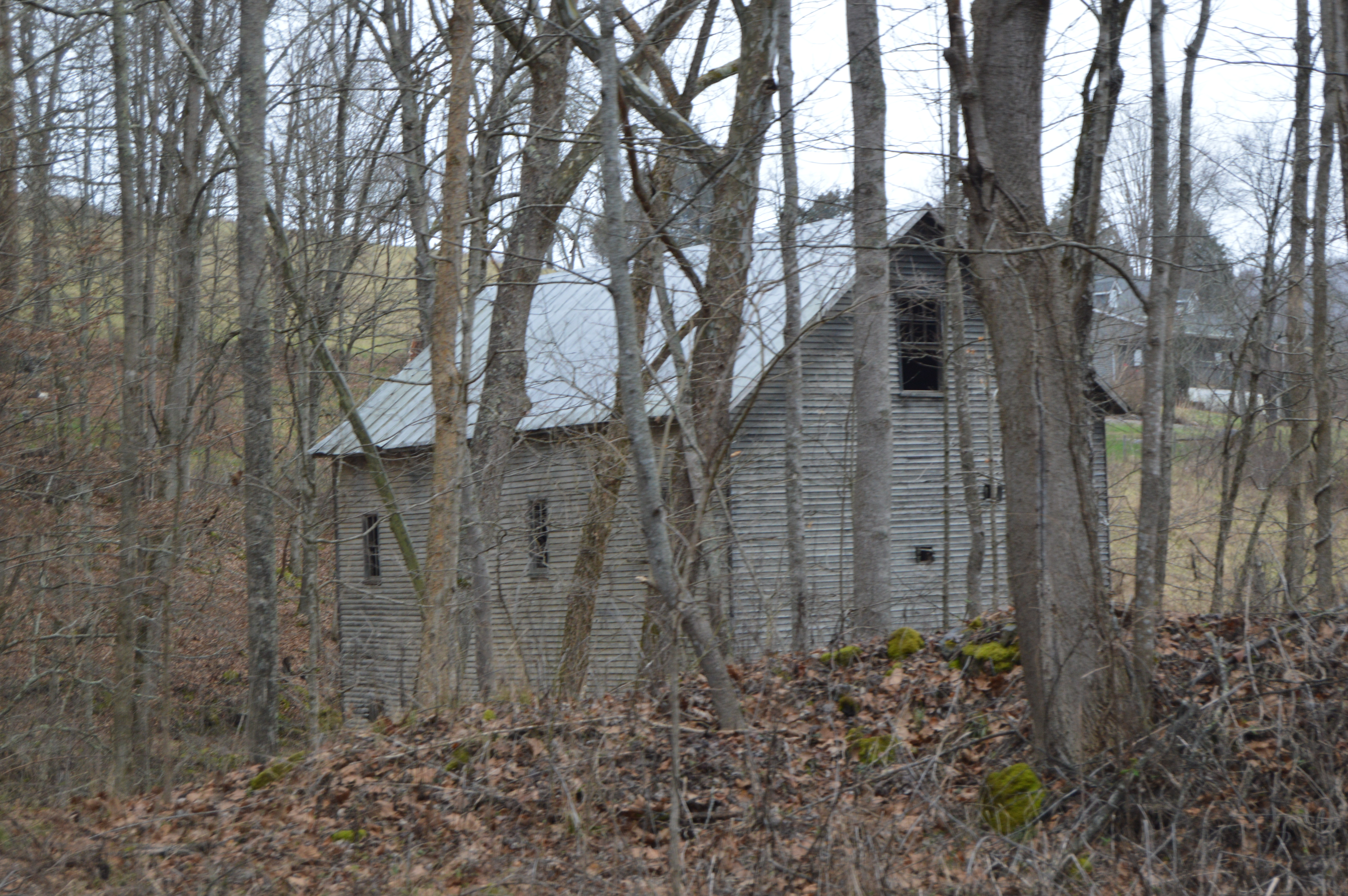
- Seen through trees

- Location within Virginia Location within the United States
- Location: Jessee’s Mill Road, 2.5 mi. N of VA 71, Cleveland, Virginia
- Coordinates: 36°54′56″N 82°10′15″W
- Area: 1 acre (0.40 ha)
- Built: c. 1850, c. 1890
- NRHP reference No.: 04001543
- VLR No.: 083-5152-0001

Significant dates
- Added to NRHP: January 20, 2005
- Designated VLR: December 1, 2004

Jessee’s Mill is a historic grist mill located near Cleveland, Russell County, Virginia. The original section was built about 1850, as a single pen log structure. About 1890, a two-story balloon frame addition was built on top of the old log structure. The mill retains much of its original milling equipment. Also located on the property are the contributing mill dam (c. 1850) and a frame barn. The mill remained in operation until 1932.

It was listed on the National Register of Historic Places in 2005.
