= Cleveland Barrens Natural Area Preserve =

Nature preserve in Virginia, US

- Location within Virginia
- Location: Russell County, Virginia
- Coordinates: 36°56′8″N 82°9′18″W
- Area: 1,288 acres (5.21 km^{2})
- Governing body: Virginia Department of Conservation and Recreation

Cleveland Barrens Natural Area Preserve is a 1,288-acre (5.21 km^{2}) Natural Area Preserve located within the Clinch River Valley in Russell County, Virginia.

The preserve protects several dolomite barrens, a globally rare natural community. These areas are typically small, natural openings in otherwise forested landscapes, characterized by thin calcareous soils, dry conditions, and exposed bedrock including limestone or dolomite. At the Cleveland Barrens Natural Area Preserve, four such barrens are found on steep, southwest-facing slopes; these barrens are dominated by various warm-season grasses, such as indiangrass, big bluestem, and little bluestem. Thirteen rare plant species and three rare insect species make use of the habitat found in the preserve.

The preserve is owned and maintained by the Virginia Department of Conservation and Recreation. It does not include improvements for public access, and visitors must make arrangements with a state-employed land steward prior to visiting.

== See also ==
- List of Virginia Natural Area Preserves
