= Willis, Russell County, Virginia =

Willis
- Unincorporated community
- Location within the Commonwealth of Virginia Willis (the United States)
- Coordinates: 36°52′6″N 82°6′50″W
- Country: United States
- State: Virginia
- County: Russell
- Time zone: UTC−5 (Eastern (EST))
  - Summer (DST): UTC−4 (EDT)

Willis (also Macktown) is an unincorporated community in Russell County, Virginia, United States. Its elevation is 2,215 feet (675 m).
