= Cleveland, Virginia =

- Town
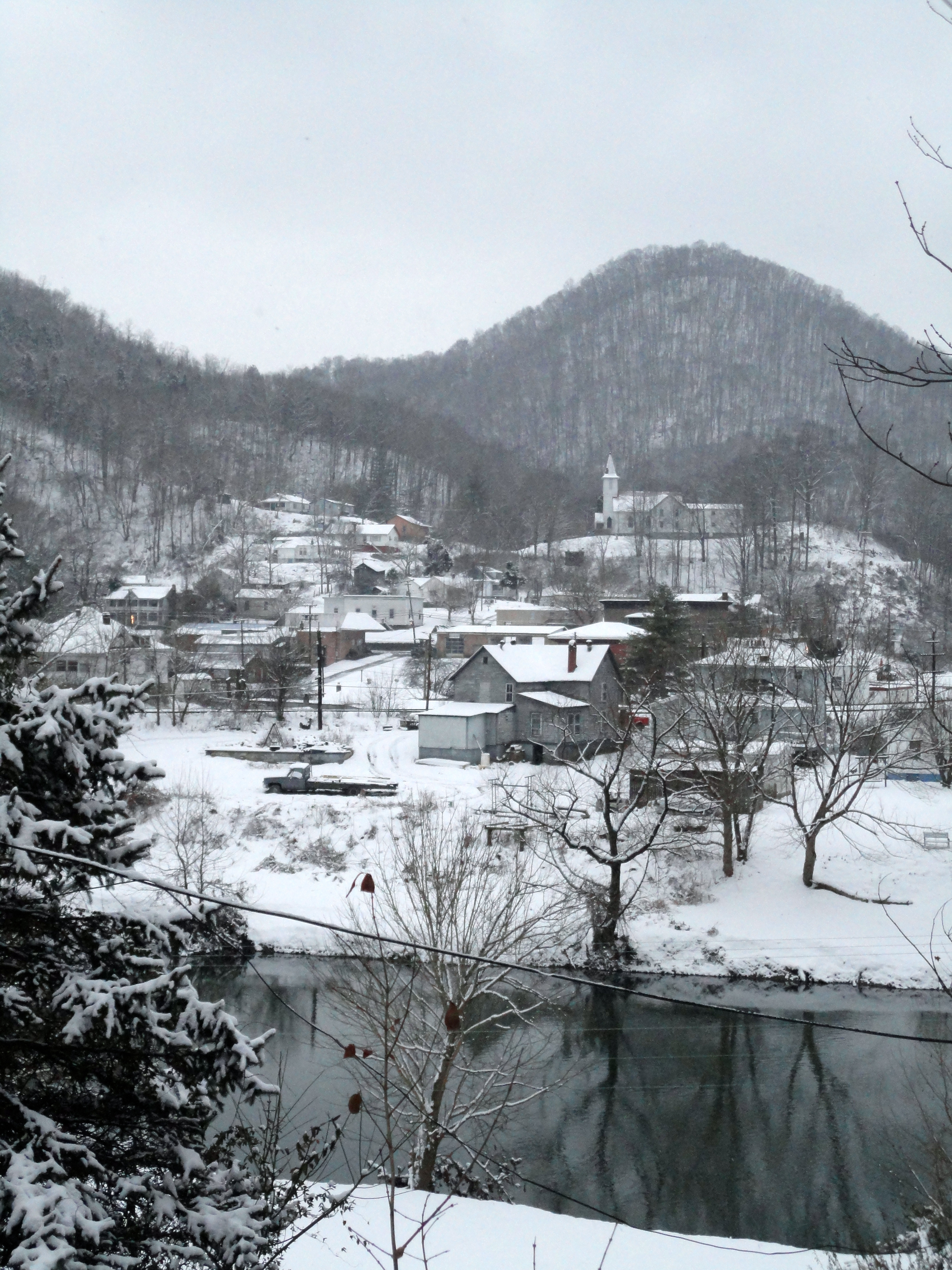
- Cleveland on Christmas Day, December 2010

- Flag Logo

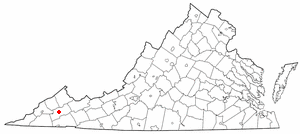
- Location of Cleveland, Virginia
- Coordinates: 36°56′37″N 82°9′8″W
- Country: United States
- State: Virginia
- County: Russell

Area
  - Total: 0.14 sq mi (0.35 km^{2})
  - Land: 0.13 sq mi (0.33 km^{2})
  - Water: 0.012 sq mi (0.03 km^{2})
- Elevation: 1,526 ft (465 m)

Population (2020)
  - Total: 136
  - Estimate (2019): 175
  - Density: 1,390.4/sq mi (536.83/km^{2})
- Time zone: UTC-5 (Eastern (EST))
  - Summer (DST): UTC-4 (EDT)
- ZIP code: 24225
- Area code: 276
- FIPS code: 51-17296
- GNIS feature ID: 1464978
- Website: Official website

Cleveland is a town in central Russell County, Virginia, United States. As of the 2020 census, Cleveland had a population of 136.

== History ==
Jessees Mill was listed on the National Register of Historic Places in 2005.

== Geography ==
Cleveland is located at 36°56′37″N 82°9′8″W (36.943674, -82.152334).

According to the United States Census Bureau, the town has a total area of 0.1 square mile (0.4 km^{2}), of which 0.1 square mile (0.3 km^{2}) is land and 0.04 square mile (0.1 km^{2}) (14.29%) is water.

The 1288-acre Cleveland Barrens Natural Area Preserve, within the Clinch River Valley, protects part of one of six top biodiversity hotspots in the United States.

== Demographics ==
Historical population
Census	Pop.	Note	%±
1910	252		—
1950	388		—
1960	415		7.0%
1970	357		−14.0%
1980	360		0.8%
1990	214		−40.6%
2000	148		−30.8%
2010	202		36.5%
2020	136		−32.7%
2025 (est.)	136	Steady	0.0%
U.S. Decennial Census

At the 2000 census there were 148 people, 81 households, and 43 families living in the town. The population density was 1,251.7 people per square mile (476.2/km^{2}). There were 113 housing units at an average density of 955.7 per square mile (363.6/km^{2}). The racial makeup of the town was 97.97% White, and 2.03% from two or more races. Of the 81 households 11.1% had children under the age of 18 living with them, 43.2% were married couples living together, 6.2% had a female householder with no husband present, and 45.7% were non-families. 42.0% of households were one person and 19.8% were one person aged 65 or older. The average household size was 1.83 and the average family size was 2.45.

The age distribution was 8.8% under the age of 18, 6.8% from 18 to 24, 23.0% from 25 to 44, 28.4% from 45 to 64, and 33.1% 65 or older. The median age was 55 years. For every 100 females there were 102.7 males. For every 100 females age 18 and over, there were 104.5 males.

The median household income was $11,346 and the median family income was $14,688. Males had a median income of $35,833 versus $25,000 for females. The per capita income for the town was $11,263. There were 36.6% of families and 41.8% of the population living below the poverty line, including 61.5% of under eighteens and 33.3% of those over 64.

== See also ==
- List of towns in Virginia
