= Smithfield (Rosedale, Virginia) =

Historic house in Virginia, United States

- U.S. National Register of Historic Places
- U.S. Historic district
- Virginia Landmarks Register
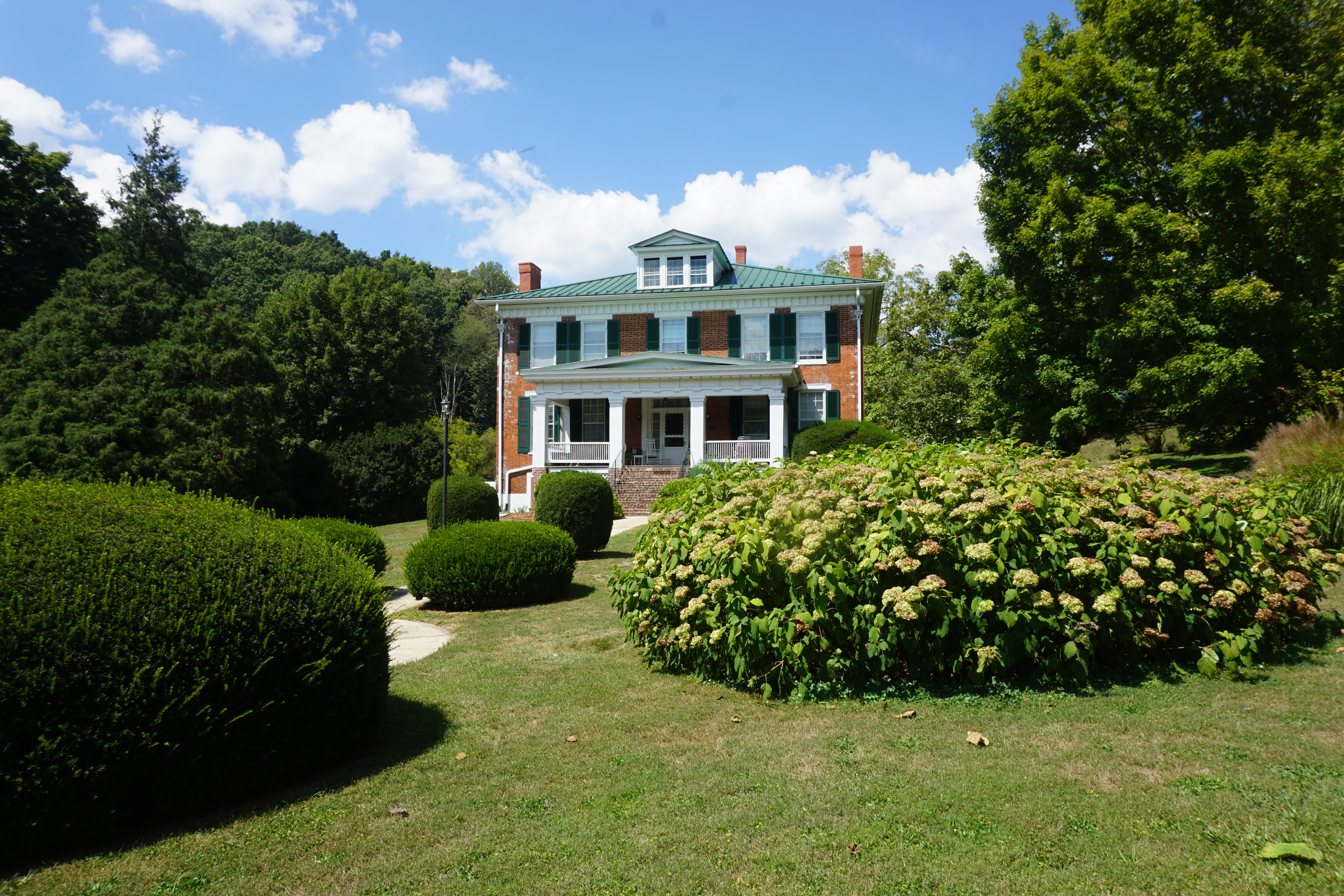
- Smithfield, c. 2019

- Location within Virginia Location within the United States
- Location: Northwestern side of U.S. Route 19, 3 mi. SW of Rosedale, near Rosedale, Virginia
- Coordinates: 36°57′19″N 81°58′59″W
- Area: 980 acres (400 ha)
- Built: 1848
- Architectural style: Greek Revival, Central passage plan
- NRHP reference No.: 94000988
- VLR No.: 083-0012

Significant dates
- Added to NRHP: August 16, 1994
- Designated VLR: June 15, 1994

Smithfield is a historic home and farm and national historic district located near Rosedale in Russell County, Virginia, United States. The district encompasses 13 contributing buildings and 5 contributing sites. The main house dates to the 1850s, and is a two-story, five-bay, central passage plan, brick Greek Revival style dwelling. Among the other buildings in the district are a brick spring house, a brick acetylene house, frame meat house, a former school house, frame horse barn, frame sheep barn, cow barn, a milking parlor, and a shop. The contributing sites include an earlier house seat, three cemeteries, and the site of a slave house.

It was listed on the National Register of Historic Places in 1994.
