= Mainstream Country (radio network) =

- Type: Radio network
- Country: United States
- Availability: National
- Owner: Westwood One
- Launch date: Unknown at this time

Mainstream Country, known on-air as The Best of the New and Gold: Your Kind of Country, was a 24-hour music format produced by Westwood One. Its playlist is composed of classic and modern country music in the 1990s to the present.

Its competitors were "Country Today" and "The Bar" by Waitt, CD Country and U.S. Country by Jones, however those assets were absorbed by Triton Media Group, leaving Citadel Media's Today's Best Country and Real Country the only competitors. The Jones and Waitt networks, except for "The Bar," will be integrated into Mainstream Country and other Dial Global country formats in late 2008 and early 2009. By 2020, its website was no longer functional.
