= Castlewood, Virginia =

Castlewood
- CDP
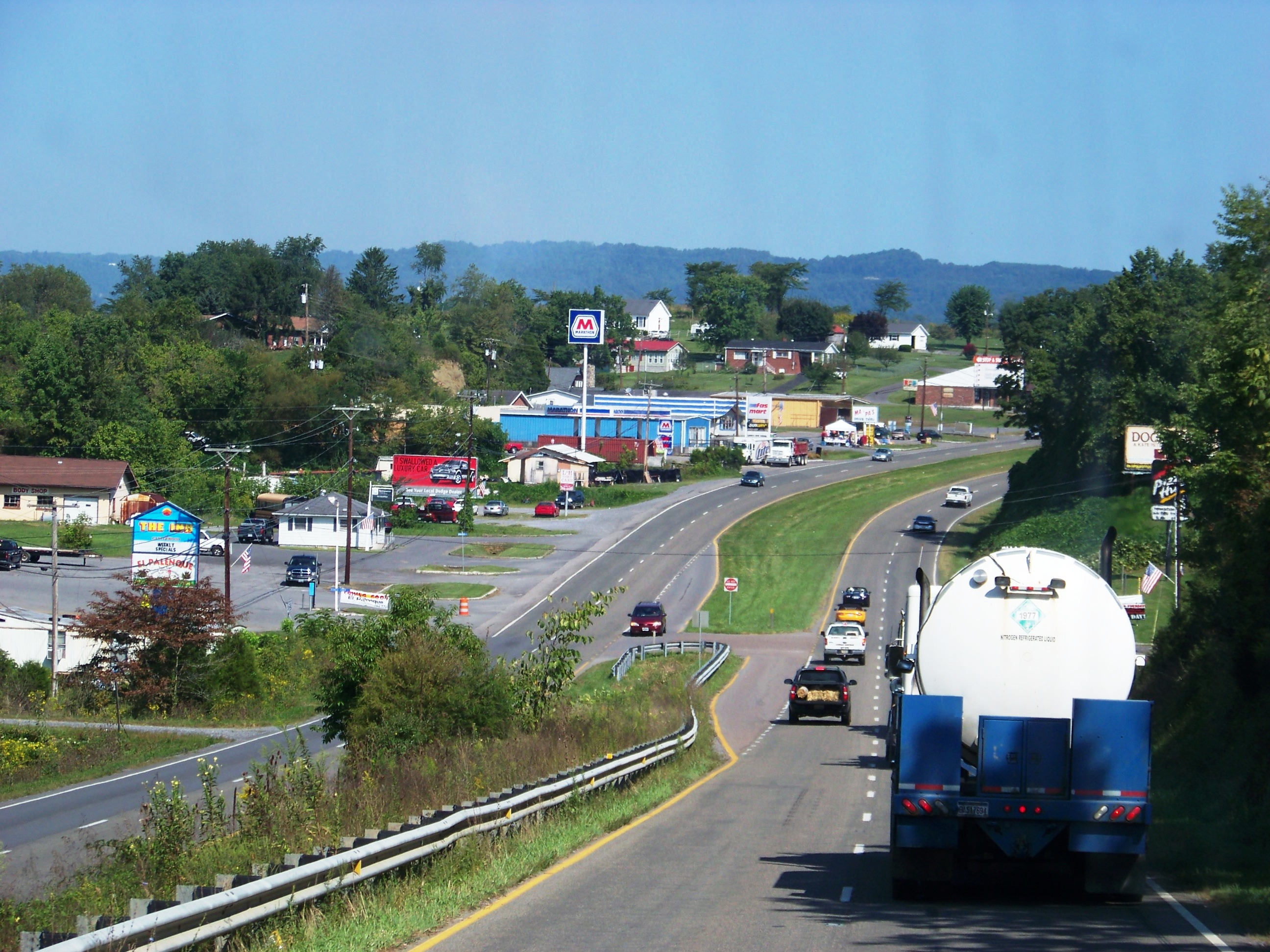
- U.S. Route 58 Alternate in Castlewood

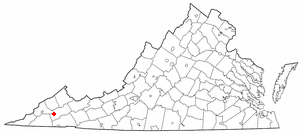
- Location of Castlewood, Virginia
- Coordinates: 36°53′25″N 82°16′49″W
- Country: United States
- State: Virginia
- County: Russell

Area
  - Total: 7.2 sq mi (18.7 km^{2})
  - Land: 7.2 sq mi (18.6 km^{2})
  - Water: 0 sq mi (0.0 km^{2})
- Elevation: 1,614 ft (492 m)

Population (2010)
  - Total: 2,045
  - Density: 285/sq mi (110/km^{2})
- Time zone: UTC−5 (Eastern (EST))
  - Summer (DST): UTC−4 (EDT)
- ZIP code: 24224
- Area code: 276
- FIPS code: 51-13512
- GNIS feature ID: 1502780

Castlewood is a census-designated place (CDP) in western Russell County, Virginia, United States. As of the 2020 census, Castlewood had a population of 1,704. Castlewood was an incorporated town from 1991 to 1997, when it reverted to unincorporated status.

== History ==
The community was originally named Castle's Woods, as the land in the immediate area had once belonged to Jacob Castle, a frontiersman in the likes of Daniel Boone. Castle purchased the land from the Shawnee Indians, for very little in trade, reportedly just a "hound dog, a knife, and a shot of whiskey". As a "Long Hunter", Castle spent long periods of time in the wilderness on hunting expeditions. There he befriended the Indians that inhabited the land in the Castlewood area. He married a Shawnee woman by the name of Gliding Swan, and they produced many children. It has been said that Castle himself showed Daniel Boone the Cumberland Gap and areas west, which led to Boone's expedition and settlement of these lands. Many descendants of Castle reside in Russell County, Virginia, and the surrounding area. Castle's father, Peter Cassell, was a German emigrant to Pennsylvania who was influential in the Dutch movement to America.

The name was modified to Castlewood by the United States Postal Service in the late 1800s, as a simplification of the original spelling and pronunciation, which was common during this time period.

In 1991, Castlewood became an incorporated town with a mayor and a six member town council. The goal of incorporation was to bring industry to the area after the loss of coal mines by building up the infrastructure. A town hall was built, financed through the newly levied property taxes. The new taxation and police department were unpopular. The town elected a government to dismantle the incorporation, a feat which was accomplished in 1997.

The Castlerun Historic District and Mason-Dorton School are listed on the National Register of Historic Places.

== Geography ==
Castlewood is located next to the Clinch River in the Appalachian Mountains of far Southwest Virginia. According to the United States Census Bureau, the CDP has a total area of 7.2 square miles (18.7 km^{2}), of which 99.86% is land and 0.14% is water.

== Demographics ==
=== 2020 census ===
As of the 2020 census, Castlewood had a population of 1,704. The median age was 48.3 years. 19.2% of residents were under the age of 18 and 27.1% of residents were 65 years of age or older. For every 100 females there were 102.9 males, and for every 100 females age 18 and over there were 101.6 males age 18 and over.

0.0% of residents lived in urban areas, while 100.0% lived in rural areas.

There were 744 households in Castlewood, of which 21.1% had children under the age of 18 living in them. Of all households, 51.5% were married-couple households, 14.2% were households with a male householder and no spouse or partner present, and 28.6% were households with a female householder and no spouse or partner present. About 27.5% of all households were made up of individuals and 17.6% had someone living alone who was 65 years of age or older.

There were 839 housing units, of which 11.3% were vacant. The homeowner vacancy rate was 2.9% and the rental vacancy rate was 14.1%.

Racial composition as of the 2020 census
Race	Number	Percent
White	1,621	95.1%
Black or African American	23	1.3%
American Indian and Alaska Native	0	0.0%
Asian	1	0.1%
Native Hawaiian and Other Pacific Islander	0	0.0%
Some other race	15	0.9%
Two or more races	44	2.6%
Hispanic or Latino (of any race)	12	0.7%

=== 2000 census ===
As of the census of 2000, there were 2,036 people residing in the CDP of Castlewood, including 637 families. The population density was 283.0 people per square mile (109.3/km^{2}). There were 950 housing units, at an average density of 132.1 per square mile (51.0/km^{2}). The racial makeup was 98.48% White, 0.93% African American, 0.10% Native American, 0.05% from other races, and 0.44% from two or more races. Hispanic or Latino of any race were 0.44% of the population.

There were 872 households, of which 27.3% had children under the age of 18 living with them, 59.3% were married couples living together, 9.9% had a female householder with no husband present, and 26.9% were non-families. 25.3% of all households were made up of individuals, and 12.6% had someone living alone who was 65 years of age or older. The average household size was 2.32, and the average family size was 2.76.

The median age was 42 years, with 20.4% under the age of 18, 7.7% from 18 to 24, 26.3% from 25 to 44, 27.8% from 45 to 64, and 17.9% who were 65 years of age or older. For every 100 females, there were 93.2 males. For every 100 females age 18 and over, there were 90.5 males.

The median household income was $27,232, and the median family income was $31,435. Males had a median income of $30,795, versus $16,576 for females. The per capita income for the CDP was $14,203. About 13.3% of families and 16.3% of the population were below the poverty line, including 23.4% of those under age 18 and 8.4% of those age 65 or over.

== Notable people ==
- Kathleen Dickenson Mellen (1895–1969) American Hawaiian author
- 49 Winchester, country band; bandmates Isaac Gibson, Chase Chafin, Bus Shelton, and Noah Patrick formed the group around 2015 in Castlewood at a house located at 49 Winchester Street
