= Honaker, Virginia =

Honaker
- Town
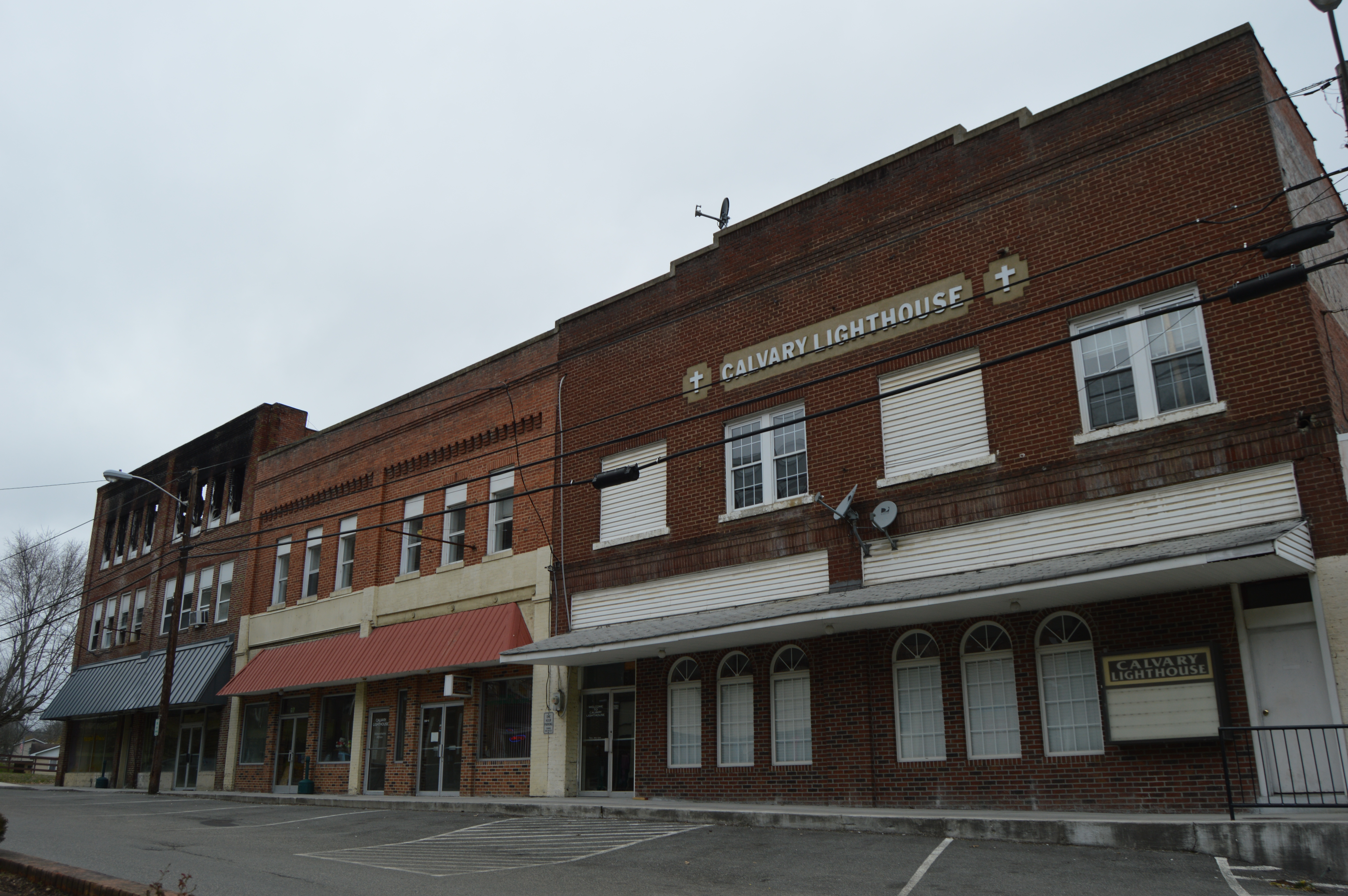
- Railroad Avenue downtown
- Nickname: Redbud Capital of the World
- Location within Virginia Location within the United States
- Coordinates: 37°1′1″N 81°58′25″W
- Country: United States
- State: Virginia
- County: Russell

Area
  - Total: 1.68 sq mi (4.34 km^{2})
  - Land: 1.68 sq mi (4.34 km^{2})
  - Water: 0 sq mi (0.00 km^{2})
- Elevation: 1,870 ft (570 m)

Population (2024)
  - Total: 1,188
  - Density: 726/sq mi (280.2/km^{2})
- Time zone: UTC-5 (Eastern (EST))
  - Summer (DST): UTC-4 (EDT)
- ZIP code: 24260
- Area code: 276
- FIPS code: 51-38280
- GNIS feature ID: 1468202
- Website: www.honakerva.com

Honaker is a town in Russell County, Virginia, United States. The population was 1,217 at the 2020 census.

== History ==
Honaker was settled as early as 1772 when William Ferrill established a homesite in the area. During Dunmore's War of 1774 a fort, known as New Garden Fort, was established to protect the settlers from Indian raids.

The Honaker Commercial Historic District was listed on the National Register of Historic Places in 2009.

== Geography ==
Honaker is located in the Clinch River watershed.

According to the United States Census Bureau, the town has a total area of 1.7 square miles (4.3 km^{2}), all land.

== Demographics ==
Historical population
Census	Pop.	Note	%±
1900	295		—
1910	369		25.1%
1920	755		104.6%
1930	710		−6.0%
1940	851		19.9%
1950	847		−0.5%
1960	851		0.5%
1970	911		7.1%
1980	1,475		61.9%
1990	950		−35.6%
2000	945		−0.5%
2010	1,449		53.3%
2020	1,217		−16.0%
2025 (est.)	1,191	▼	−2.1%
U.S. Decennial Census

As of the census of 2010, there were 1,449 people and 684 households. The racial makeup of the town was 98.83% White, 0.20% African American, 0.28% Native American, and 0.69% from two or more races. Hispanic or Latino of any race were .35% of the population.

There were 684 households in 2010, out of which 23.39% had children under the age of 18 living with them. The number of vacant housing in Honaker was 5.59%. In the town, the population was spread out, with 21.95% under the age of 18, 5.94% from 20 to 24, 12.84% from 25 to 34, 19.81% from 35 to 49, 20.63% from 50 to 64, and 17.05% who were 65 years of age or older.

The median income for a household in the town was $22,969, and the median income for a family was $28,611. Males had a median income of $26,071 versus $17,386 for females. The per capita income for the town was $11,888. About 20.4% of families and 27.2% of the population were below the poverty line, including 41.9% of those under age 18 and 17.2% of those age 65 or over.

== Events and attractions ==
Honaker holds the Honaker Redbud Festival each spring, when the redbud trees start to bloom, celebrating its status as "Redbud Capital of the World". This celebration usually consists of dunk tanks, an array of food vendors, local petting zoos, horse rides, local beauty pageants and Inflatable playgrounds for the children.

== Notable people ==
- Jordan Stout, NFL punter, played for Penn State, drafted in the 4th round, 130th overall in the 2022 NFL Draft by the Baltimore Ravens
