= Lebanon, Virginia =

Lebanon
- Town
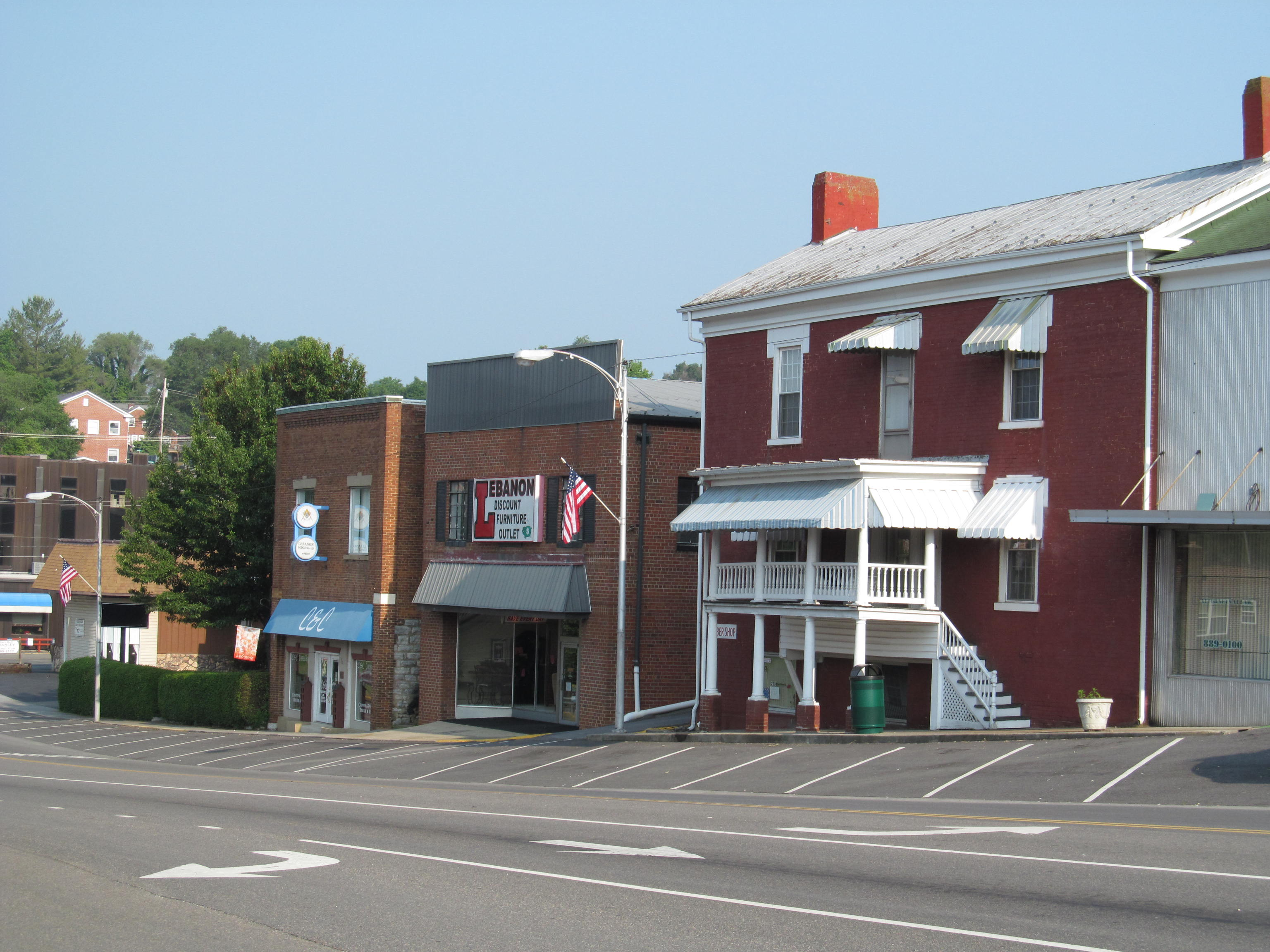
- Downtown Lebanon (2012)

- Seal
- Nickname: "Heart of Southwest Virginia"
- Motto: "Progressing for the Future"
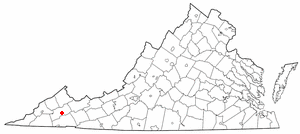
- Location in Virginia
- Coordinates: 36°54′3″N 82°4′37″W
- Country: United States
- State: Virginia
- County: Russell
- Established: 1819

Government
  - Mayor: Nelson A.Dodi

Area
  - Total: 4.83 sq mi (12.52 km^{2})
  - Land: 4.81 sq mi (12.47 km^{2})
  - Water: 0.019 sq mi (0.05 km^{2})
- Elevation: 2,060 ft (628 m)

Population (2020)
  - Total: 3,159
  - Estimate (2019): 3,147
  - Density: 653/sq mi (252.3/km^{2})
- U.S. Census Bureau, 2010 Population Estimates
- Time zone: UTC−5 (EST)
  - Summer (DST): UTC−4 (EDT)
- ZIP code: 24266
- Area code: 276
- FIPS code: 51-44696
- GNIS feature ID: 1498504
- Website: lebanonva.net

Lebanon is a town in Russell County, Virginia, United States. As of the 2020 census, Lebanon had a population of 3,159. It is the county seat of Russell County.

== History ==
The town of Lebanon was founded in 1818 as per an effort to create a new county seat for Russell County. The Lebanon Lutheran Church was founded in 1851 by pastor Jacob Scherer.

== Geography ==
According to the United States Census Bureau, the town has a total area of 4.1 square miles (10.6 km^{2}), all land.

=== Climate ===
The town has a humid subtropical climate (Köppen climate classification Cfa). The Trewartha climate classification is temperate oceanic due to five months of winter chill (monthly means below 10 °C (50 °F)), abbreviated "Do" on climate maps.

Climate data for Lebanon, Virginia (1991–2020 normals, extremes 1909–1913, 1989–present)
Month	Jan	Feb	Mar	Apr	May	Jun	Jul	Aug	Sep	Oct	Nov	Dec	Year
Record high °F (°C)	79 (26)	79 (26)	89 (32)	89 (32)	90 (32)	99 (37)	99 (37)	94 (34)	95 (35)	92 (33)	81 (27)	76 (24)	99 (37)
Mean maximum °F (°C)	65.3 (18.5)	67.9 (19.9)	74.5 (23.6)	82.1 (27.8)	85.2 (29.6)	89.1 (31.7)	90.2 (32.3)	89.3 (31.8)	87.9 (31.1)	81.1 (27.3)	73.8 (23.2)	66.5 (19.2)	91.4 (33.0)
Mean daily maximum °F (°C)	44.9 (7.2)	48.4 (9.1)	56.5 (13.6)	66.9 (19.4)	74.5 (23.6)	81.2 (27.3)	84.0 (28.9)	83.2 (28.4)	78.7 (25.9)	68.1 (20.1)	57.0 (13.9)	48.2 (9.0)	66.0 (18.9)
Daily mean °F (°C)	33.9 (1.1)	37.0 (2.8)	44.0 (6.7)	53.2 (11.8)	61.5 (16.4)	69.1 (20.6)	72.5 (22.5)	71.5 (21.9)	65.9 (18.8)	54.4 (12.4)	44.0 (6.7)	37.3 (2.9)	53.7 (12.1)
Mean daily minimum °F (°C)	22.9 (−5.1)	25.6 (−3.6)	31.4 (−0.3)	39.5 (4.2)	48.5 (9.2)	56.9 (13.8)	61.0 (16.1)	59.7 (15.4)	53.2 (11.8)	40.8 (4.9)	30.9 (−0.6)	26.4 (−3.1)	41.4 (5.2)
Mean minimum °F (°C)	3.5 (−15.8)	7.2 (−13.8)	14.4 (−9.8)	25.3 (−3.7)	34.1 (1.2)	45.6 (7.6)	52.0 (11.1)	51.0 (10.6)	39.9 (4.4)	26.1 (−3.3)	17.2 (−8.2)	10.5 (−11.9)	−0.2 (−17.9)
Record low °F (°C)	−18 (−28)	−24 (−31)	−6 (−21)	14 (−10)	26 (−3)	37 (3)	41 (5)	43 (6)	27 (−3)	14 (−10)	8 (−13)	−2 (−19)	−24 (−31)
Average precipitation inches (mm)	3.49 (89)	3.68 (93)	4.18 (106)	4.12 (105)	4.42 (112)	4.31 (109)	4.86 (123)	4.04 (103)	3.34 (85)	2.55 (65)	3.01 (76)	3.94 (100)	45.94 (1,167)
Average snowfall inches (cm)	4.4 (11)	2.8 (7.1)	2.5 (6.4)	0.0 (0.0)	0.0 (0.0)	0.0 (0.0)	0.0 (0.0)	0.0 (0.0)	0.0 (0.0)	0.2 (0.51)	0.5 (1.3)	2.0 (5.1)	12.4 (31)
Average precipitation days (≥ 0.01 in)	12.3	11.9	13.6	12.4	14.0	12.6	13.2	11.3	8.6	9.1	9.5	12.7	141.2
Average snowy days (≥ 0.1 in)	2.5	2.0	1.3	0.1	0.0	0.0	0.0	0.0	0.0	0.1	0.4	1.7	8.1
Source: NOAA

== Demographics ==
Historical population
Census	Pop.	Note	%±
1860	264		—
1870	209		−20.8%
1880	244		16.7%
1890	310		27.0%
1900	325		4.8%
1910	366		12.6%
1920	469		28.1%
1930	560		19.4%
1940	622		11.1%
1950	672		8.0%
1960	2,085		210.3%
1970	2,272		9.0%
1980	3,206		41.1%
1990	3,386		5.6%
2000	3,273		−3.3%
2010	3,424		4.6%
2020	3,159		−7.7%
U.S. Decennial Census

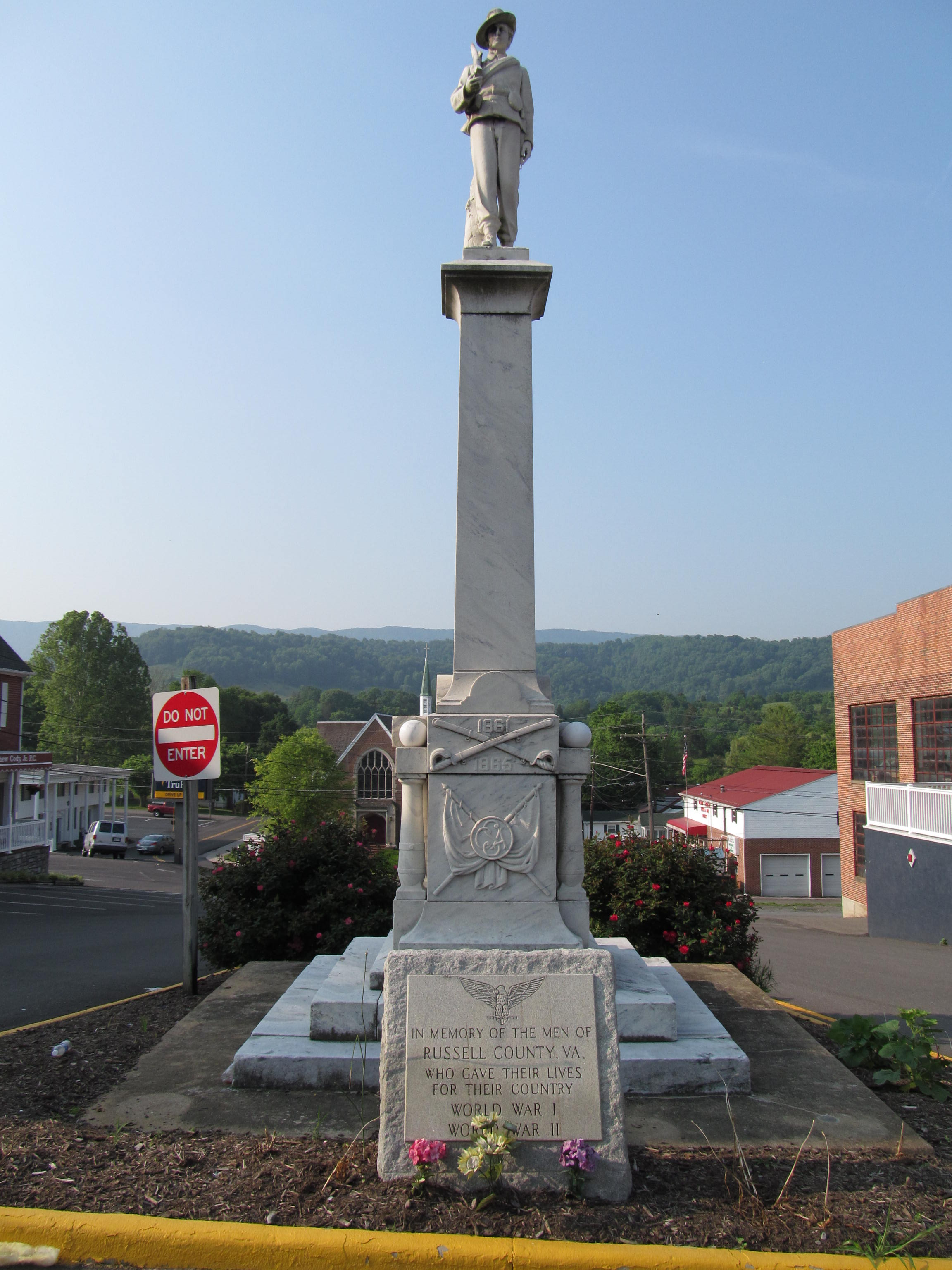
Confederate Monument in Lebanon

=== 2020 census ===
As of the 2020 census, Lebanon had a population of 3,159. The median age was 44.1 years. 19.4% of residents were under the age of 18 and 22.2% of residents were 65 years of age or older. For every 100 females there were 83.8 males, and for every 100 females age 18 and over there were 80.7 males age 18 and over.

0.0% of residents lived in urban areas, while 100.0% lived in rural areas.

There were 1,405 households in Lebanon, of which 25.0% had children under the age of 18 living in them. Of all households, 39.0% were married-couple households, 16.3% were households with a male householder and no spouse or partner present, and 38.2% were households with a female householder and no spouse or partner present. About 35.5% of all households were made up of individuals and 16.7% had someone living alone who was 65 years of age or older.

There were 1,622 housing units, of which 13.4% were vacant. The homeowner vacancy rate was 3.3% and the rental vacancy rate was 13.2%.

Racial composition as of the 2020 census
Race	Number	Percent
White	2,909	92.1%
Black or African American	89	2.8%
American Indian and Alaska Native	5	0.2%
Asian	24	0.8%
Native Hawaiian and Other Pacific Islander	0	0.0%
Some other race	13	0.4%
Two or more races	119	3.8%
Hispanic or Latino (of any race)	54	1.7%

=== 2010 census ===
As of the 2010 census, there were 3,424 people, 1,507 households, and 884 families living in the town. The population density was 835.1 people per square mile (323.0/km^{2}). There were 1,681 housing units at an average density of 410.0 per square mile (158.6/km^{2}). The racial makeup of the town was 94.7% White, 2.9% African American, 0.3% Native American, 0.5% from other races, and 0.8% from two or more races. Hispanic or Latino of any race were 1.4% of the population.

There were 1,507 households, out of which 23.7% had children under the age of 18 living with them, 41.0% were married couples living together, 14.1% had a female householder with no husband present, and 41.3% were non-families. 36.5% of all households were made up of individuals, and 16.9% had someone living alone who was 65 years of age or older. The average household size was 2.17 and the average family size was 2.84.

In the town, the population was spread out, with 21.0% under the age of 18, 5.9% from 20 to 24, 25.9% from 25 to 44, 24.8% from 45 to 64, and 20.0% who were 65 years of age or older. The median age was 41 years. For every 100 females, there were 86.9 males. For every 100 females aged 18 and over, there were 82.6 males.

=== Income and poverty ===
The median income for a household in the town was $24,272, and the median income for a family was $47,708. Males had a median income of $42,404 versus $37,900 for females. The per capita income for the town was $23,822. About 25.9% of families and 28.8% of the population were below the poverty line, including 40.0% of those under age 18 and 11.9% of those age 65 or over.

== Arts and culture ==
Sites in Lebanon listed on the National Register of Historic Places include Blackford Bridge, Carter Hill, Daugherty's Cave and Breeding Site, Samuel Gilmer House, and Stephen B. Quillen House.

Lebanon is the location of the only Bonanza restaurant in the Southern United States, out of four in the country.
