= Russell County, Virginia =

County in Virginia, United States

- County
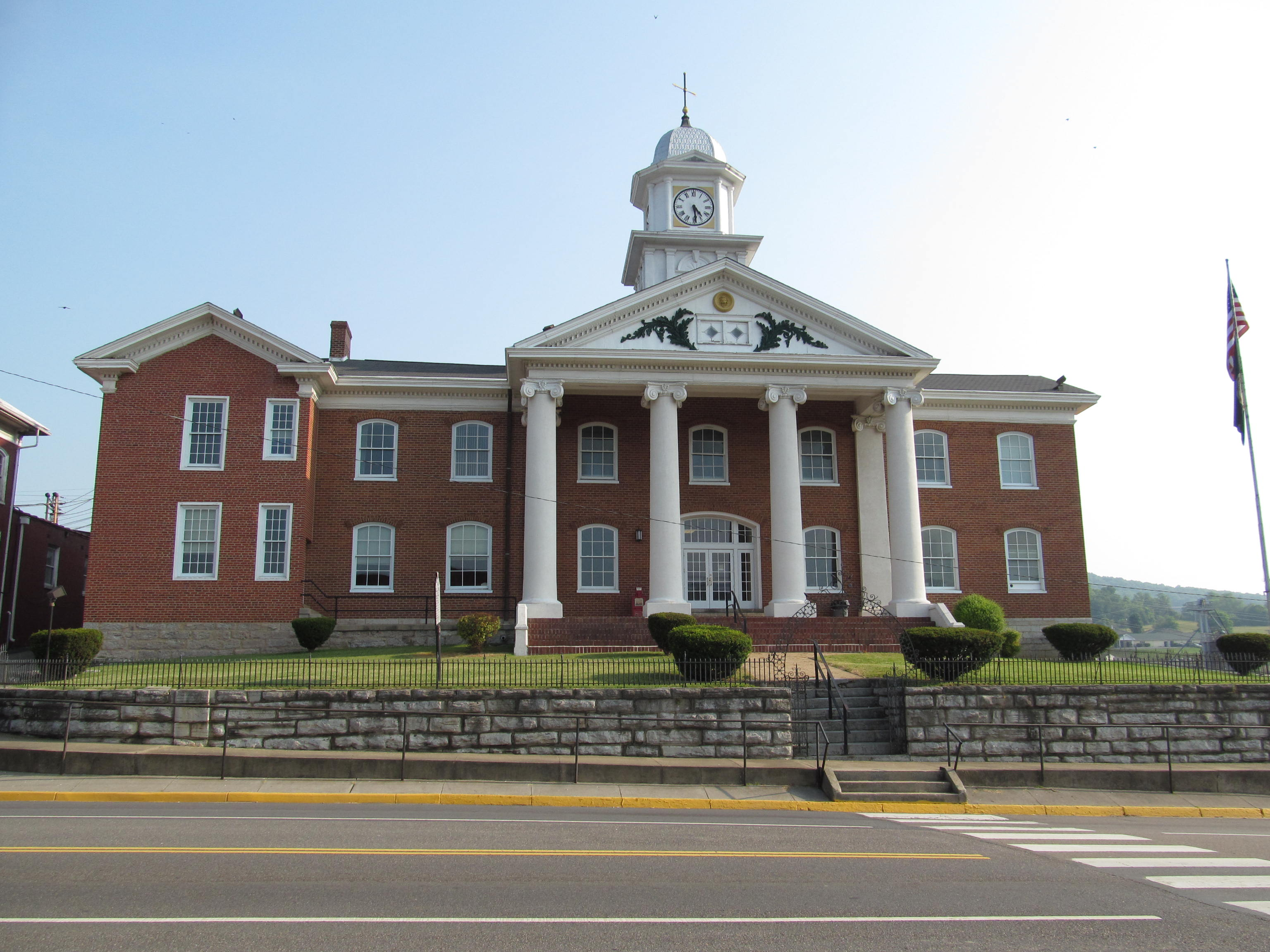
- Russell County Courthouse in Lebanon

- Location within the U.S. state of Virginia
- Coordinates: 36°56′N 82°06′W
- Country: United States
- State: Virginia
- Founded: January 2, 1786
- Named for: William Russell
- Seat: Lebanon
- Largest town: Lebanon

Area
  - Total: 477 sq mi (1,240 km^{2})
  - Land: 474 sq mi (1,230 km^{2})
  - Water: 2.9 sq mi (7.5 km^{2}) 0.6%

Population (2020)
  - Total: 25,781
  - Estimate (2025): 25,332 ▼
  - Density: 54.4/sq mi (21.0/km^{2})
- Time zone: UTC−5 (Eastern)
  - Summer (DST): UTC−4 (EDT)
- Congressional district: 9th
- Website: www.russellcountyva.us

Russell County (/rʌs.səl/) is a county located in the Commonwealth of Virginia. As of the 2020 census, the population was 25,781. Its county seat is Lebanon.

== History ==
On January 2, 1786, Russell County was established from a section of Washington County. L.P. Summers, a Washington County historian later wrote, "Washington County lost a great extent of country and many valuable citizens when Russell County was formed." The county was named for Culpeper County native Colonel William Russell.

The first court met in May 1786 in the Castle's Woods settlement (present-day Castlewood) in the house of William Robinson. Later, a new place was built to house the County Seat. The structure used as a courthouse still stands, and is referred to as "The Old Courthouse." The present Courthouse, located in Lebanon, has been in use since 1874. Once vast, Russell County was split several times, giving rise to Tazewell County, Lee County, Scott County, Wise County, Buchanan County and Dickenson County.

Among Russell County's most famous politicians were Daniel Boone, Governor H.C. Stuart, Dale Carter, Tennessee State Representative Boyd C. Fugate and Virginia state Senator Macon M. Long. The largest cattle farm East of the Mississippi River, and one of the oldest corporations in the country, Stuart Land & Cattle, remains headquartered at Rosedale in Russell County.

Much of the county's history has been documented by the Clinch Valley Times, the Tazewell Republican, the Abingdon Virginian, and the Lebanon News.

== Geography ==
According to the U.S. Census Bureau, the county has a total area of 477 square miles (1,240 km^{2}), of which 474 square miles (1,230 km^{2}) is land and 2.9 square miles (7.5 km^{2}) (0.6%) is water. Russell County is one of the 423 counties served by the Appalachian Regional Commission, and it is identified as part of "Greater Appalachia" by Colin Woodard in his book American Nations: A History of the Eleven Rival Regional Cultures of North America.

The county has the fourth highest peak in Virginia, Beartown Mountain.

=== Adjacent counties ===
- Dickenson County – northwest
- Buchanan County – north
- Tazewell County – east
- Smyth County – southeast
- Washington County – south
- Scott County – southwest
- Wise County – west

=== Major highways ===
- US 19
- US 58 Alt.
- SR 63
- SR 65
- SR 67
- SR 71
- SR 80
- SR 82

== Demographics ==
Historical population
Census	Pop.	Note	%±
1790	3,338		—
1800	4,808		44.0%
1810	6,319		31.4%
1820	5,536		−12.4%
1830	6,714		21.3%
1840	7,878		17.3%
1850	11,919		51.3%
1860	10,280		−13.8%
1870	11,103		8.0%
1880	13,906		25.2%
1890	16,126		16.0%
1900	18,031		11.8%
1910	23,474		30.2%
1920	26,786		14.1%
1930	25,957		−3.1%
1940	26,627		2.6%
1950	26,818		0.7%
1960	26,290		−2.0%
1970	24,533		−6.7%
1980	31,761		29.5%
1990	28,667		−9.7%
2000	30,308		5.7%
2010	28,897		−4.7%
2020	25,781		−10.8%
2025 (est.)	25,332	▼	−1.7%
U.S. Decennial Census; 1790–1960 1900–1990; 1990–2000 2010 2020

=== Racial and ethnic composition ===
Russell County, Virginia – Racial and ethnic composition Note: the US Census treats Hispanic/Latino as an ethnic category. This table excludes Latinos from the racial categories and assigns them to a separate category. Hispanics/Latinos may be of any race.
Race / Ethnicity (NH = Non-Hispanic)	Pop 1980	Pop 1990	Pop 2000	Pop 2010	Pop 2020	% 1980	% 1990	% 2000	% 2010	% 2020
White alone (NH)	31,262	28,248	28,981	28,142	24,754	98.43%	98.54%	95.62%	97.39%	96.02%
Black or African American alone (NH)	300	315	923	227	222	0.94%	1.10%	3.05%	0.79%	0.86%
Native American or Alaska Native alone (NH)	28	13	27	40	17	0.09%	0.05%	0.09%	0.14%	0.07%
Asian alone (NH)	14	15	15	53	42	0.04%	0.05%	0.05%	0.18%	0.16%
Native Hawaiian or Pacific Islander alone (NH)	x	x	1	1	1	x	x	0.00%	0.00%	0.00%
Other race alone (NH)	0	0	5	9	25	0.00%	0.00%	0.02%	0.03%	0.10%
Mixed race or Multiracial (NH)	x	x	119	150	552	x	x	0.39%	0.52%	2.14%
Hispanic or Latino (any race)	157	76	237	275	168	0.49%	0.27%	0.78%	0.95%	0.65%
Total	31,761	28,667	30,308	28,897	25,781	100.00%	100.00%	100.00%	100.00%	100.00%

=== 2020 census ===
As of the 2020 census, the county had a population of 25,781. The median age was 46.9 years. 19.2% of residents were under the age of 18 and 22.5% of residents were 65 years of age or older. For every 100 females there were 94.9 males, and for every 100 females age 18 and over there were 93.6 males age 18 and over.

The racial makeup of the county was 96.3% White, 0.9% Black or African American, 0.1% American Indian and Alaska Native, 0.2% Asian, 0.0% Native Hawaiian and Pacific Islander, 0.3% from some other race, and 2.3% from two or more races. Hispanic or Latino residents of any race comprised 0.7% of the population.

0.6% of residents lived in urban areas, while 99.4% lived in rural areas.

There were 11,063 households in the county, of which 25.0% had children under the age of 18 living with them and 26.1% had a female householder with no spouse or partner present. About 28.8% of all households were made up of individuals and 14.9% had someone living alone who was 65 years of age or older.

There were 12,754 housing units, of which 13.3% were vacant. Among occupied housing units, 77.9% were owner-occupied and 22.1% were renter-occupied. The homeowner vacancy rate was 1.9% and the rental vacancy rate was 10.3%.

=== 2010 Census ===
The 2010 census showed a population decline, with only 28,897 residing in Russell County.

As of the census of 2000, there were 30,308 people, 11,789 households, and 8,818 families residing in the county. The population density was 64 people per square mile (25 people/km^{2}). There were 13,191 housing units at an average density of 28 units per square mile (11 units/km^{2}). The racial makeup of the county was 96.07% White, 3.08% Black or African American, 0.11% Native American, 0.05% Asian, 0.28% from other races, and 0.40% from two or more races. 0.78% of the population were Hispanic or Latino of any race.

There were 11,789 households, out of which 31.00% had children under the age of 18 living with them, 60.90% were married couples living together, 10.10% had a female householder with no husband present, and 25.20% were non-families. 23.10% of all households were made up of individuals, and 10.00% had someone living alone who was 65 years of age or older. The average household size was 2.44 and the average family size was 2.87.

In the county, the population was spread out, with 21.20% under the age of 18, 8.60% from 18 to 24, 30.90% from 25 to 44, 26.00% from 45 to 64, and 13.30% who were 65 years of age or older. The median age was 39 years. For every 100 females there were 102.70 males. For every 100 females age 18 and over, there were 103.30 males.

The median income for a household in the county was $26,834, and the median income for a family was $31,491. Males had a median income of $26,950 versus $20,108 for females. The per capita income for the county was $14,863. About 13.00% of families and 16.30% of the population were below the poverty line, including 21.30% of those under age 18 and 16.90% of those age 65 or over.

== Education ==
=== Public high schools ===
- Castlewood High School, Castlewood
- Honaker High School, Honaker
- Lebanon High School, Lebanon

== Fire and rescue services ==
- Castlewood Fire and Rescue
- Lebanon Lifesaving Crew
- New Garden Rescue
- Lebanon Fire
- Honaker Fire
- Dante Rescue
- Dante Fire
- Copper Creek Fire
- Belfast Fire
- Saint Paul Fire
- Cleveland Volunteer Fire Department
- Cleveland Lifesaving Crew

== Communities ==
=== Towns ===
- Cleveland
- Honaker
- Lebanon
- St. Paul (partially in Wise County)

=== Census-designated places ===
- Castlewood
- Dante (partially in Dickenson County)
- Raven (mostly in Tazewell County)

=== Other unincorporated communities ===
- Belfast
- Carbo
- Copper Creek
- Dickensonville
- Drill
- Hamlin
- Rosedale
- Sun
- Swords Creek
- Willis
- Hansonville

== Politics ==
United States presidential election results for Russell County, Virginia
Year	Republican		Democratic		Third party(ies)	
Year	No.	%	No.	%	No.	%
1912	588	23.34%	1,298	51.53%	633	25.13%
1916	1,410	47.14%	1,570	52.49%	11	0.37%
1920	1,772	50.90%	1,704	48.95%	5	0.14%
1924	1,848	41.27%	2,554	57.03%	76	1.70%
1928	2,006	44.41%	2,511	55.59%	0	0.00%
1932	1,386	29.67%	3,274	70.09%	11	0.24%
1936	1,599	33.59%	3,143	66.03%	18	0.38%
1940	2,080	40.00%	3,109	59.79%	11	0.21%
1944	2,385	44.58%	2,945	55.05%	20	0.37%
1948	2,447	46.67%	2,689	51.29%	107	2.04%
1952	2,937	47.33%	3,253	52.42%	16	0.26%
1956	3,550	49.14%	3,641	50.40%	33	0.46%
1960	3,044	46.44%	3,496	53.34%	14	0.21%
1964	3,012	40.89%	4,330	58.78%	25	0.34%
1968	3,858	43.49%	3,554	40.06%	1,460	16.46%
1972	5,010	58.93%	3,367	39.60%	125	1.47%
1976	4,287	40.19%	6,014	56.38%	366	3.43%
1980	4,778	43.94%	5,764	53.01%	332	3.05%
1984	5,738	45.54%	6,760	53.66%	101	0.80%
1988	4,374	40.68%	6,222	57.86%	157	1.46%
1992	3,891	33.88%	6,480	56.43%	1,113	9.69%
1996	3,706	36.59%	5,437	53.68%	985	9.73%
2000	5,065	46.93%	5,442	50.43%	285	2.64%
2004	6,077	53.20%	5,167	45.23%	179	1.57%
2008	6,389	55.59%	4,932	42.91%	173	1.51%
2012	8,180	67.67%	3,718	30.76%	190	1.57%
2016	9,521	77.75%	2,330	19.03%	395	3.23%
2020	10,879	81.27%	2,373	17.73%	134	1.00%
2024	11,303	83.44%	2,172	16.03%	72	0.53%

== See also ==
- National Register of Historic Places listings in Russell County, Virginia
- Russell County History
