= 2014 United States state legislative elections =

- November 4, 2014

87 legislative chambers 46 states
	Majority party	Minority party	Third party
Party	Republican	Democratic	Coalition
Chambers before	57	40 (Note: Democrats briefly gained control of the tied Virginia Senate due to the seating of Democratic lieutenant governor Ralph Northam)	2 (Note: The New York Senate was controlled by a coalition of Republicans and members of the Independent Democratic Conference) (Note: In the Washington State Senate, two Democrats caucused with Republicans to form the Majority Coalition Caucus. Three additional Democrats also caucus with the majority.)
Chambers after	68	30	1 (Note: In the Washington State Senate, one Democrat caucused with Republicans to form the Majority Coalition Caucus)
Overall change	▲11	▼10	▼1
- Map of upper house elections: Democrats retained control Republicans gained control Republicans retained control Coalition retained control Non-partisan legislature No regularly-scheduled elections

- Map of lower house elections: Democrats retained control Republicans gained control Republicans retained control Non-partisan legislature No regularly-scheduled elections

Elections to state legislatures were held in 46 U.S. states in 2014 with a total of 6,049 seats up for election (82 percent of the total number of state legislative seats in the United States). Six territorial chambers were up in four territories and the District of Columbia.

Prior to the general election, Republicans regained control of the Virginia Senate after winning a decisive August special election. They had lost control at the start of the year due to the election of Democratic lieutenant governor Ralph Northam.

In the general election, Republicans initially gained control of nine legislative chambers: both chambers of the Nevada Legislature (which gave them a trifecta for the first time since 1931), the Minnesota House of Representatives, the New Hampshire House of Representatives, the New Mexico House of Representatives for the first time since 1955, the West Virginia House of Delegates, the Colorado Senate, the Maine Senate, and the New York Senate, which was previously under a Republican-led coalition. This increased the total number of Republican-controlled state houses from 58 to 67. The day after the election, Republicans, who achieved a 17–17 tie in the West Virginia Senate, gained control of that chamber as well thanks to the defection of State Senator Daniel Hall, thus increasing their total gains to ten, for a final total of 68 state houses won. This allowed Republicans to win control of either chamber of the West Virginia legislature for the first time since 1933.

The election left the Republicans in control of the highest amount of state legislatures in the party's history since 1928, and it also left the Democratic Party in control of the smallest number of state legislatures since 1860. This election marks the last time Democrats won control of a state legislative chamber in a deeply Republican state.

== Summary table ==
Regularly scheduled elections were held in 87 of the 99 state legislative chambers in the United States; nationwide, regularly scheduled elections were held for 6,064 of the 7,383 legislative seats. Most legislative chambers held elections for all seats, but some legislative chambers that use staggered elections held elections for only a portion of the total seats in the chamber. The chambers that were not up for election either hold regularly scheduled elections in odd-numbered years, or have four-year terms and hold all regularly scheduled elections in presidential election years.

Note that this table only covers regularly scheduled elections; additional special elections took place concurrently with these regularly scheduled elections.

State	Upper House				Lower House			
State	Seats up	Total	% up	Term	Seats up	Total	% up	Term
Alabama	35	35	100	4	105	105	100	4
Alaska	10	20	50	4	40	40	100	2
Arizona	30	30	100	2	60	60	100	2
Arkansas	18	35	51	2/4 (Note: The upper houses of Arkansas, Delaware, Florida, Hawaii, Illinois, Minnesota, New Jersey, and Texas use a 2-4-4 term length system.)	100	100	100	2
California	20	40	50	4	80	80	100	2
Colorado	17	35	49	4	65	65	100	2
Connecticut	36	36	100	2	151	151	100	2
Delaware	10	21	48	2/4	41	41	100	2
Florida	20	40	50	2/4	120	120	100	2
Georgia	56	56	100	2	180	180	100	2
Hawaii	12	25	48	2/4	51	51	100	2
Idaho	35	35	100	2	70	70	100	2
Illinois	39	59	66	2/4	118	118	100	2
Indiana	25	50	50	4	100	100	100	2
Iowa	25	50	50	4	100	100	100	2
Kansas	0	40	0	4	125	125	100	2
Kentucky	19	38	50	4	100	100	100	2
Louisiana	0	39	0	4	0	105	0	4
Maine	35	35	100	2	151	151	100	2
Maryland	47	47	100	4	141	141	100	4
Massachusetts	40	40	100	2	160	160	100	2
Michigan	38	38	100	4	110	110	100	2
Minnesota	0	67	0	2/4	134	134	100	2
Mississippi	0	52	0	4	0	122	0	4
Missouri	17	34	50	4	163	163	100	2
Montana	25	50	50	4	100	100	100	2
Nebraska	24 (Note: These figures represent the seats of Nebraska's unicameral legislature.)	49	49	4	N/A (unicameral)			
Nevada	11	21	52	4	42	42	100	2
New Hampshire	24	24	100	2	400	400	100	2
New Jersey	0	40	0	2/4	0	80	0	2
New Mexico	0	42	100	4	70	70	100	2
New York	63	63	100	2	150	150	100	2
North Carolina	50	50	100	2	120	120	100	2
North Dakota	24	47	51	4	47	94	50	4
Ohio	16	33	52	4	99	99	100	2
Oklahoma	24	48	50	4	101	101	100	2
Oregon	15	30	50	4	60	60	100	2
Pennsylvania	25	50	50	4	203	203	100	2
Rhode Island	38	38	100	2	75	75	100	2
South Carolina	0	46	0	4	124	124	100	2
South Dakota	35	35	100	2	70	70	100	2
Tennessee	17	33	52	4	99	99	100	2
Texas	15	31	48	2/4	150	150	100	2
Utah	14	29	48	4	75	75	100	2
Vermont	30	30	100	2	150	150	100	2
Virginia	0	40	0	4	0	100	0	2
Washington	25	49	49	4	98	98	100	2
West Virginia	17	34	50	4	100	100	100	2
Wisconsin	17	33	52	4	99	99	100	2
Wyoming	15	30	50	4	60	60	100	2
Total	1106	1972	56	N/A	4958	5411	92	N/A

== Electoral predictions ==
Predictors considered Democrats to be vulnerable to significant losses in legislative control, owing to the six-year itch of the presidency of Democrat Barack Obama. Most of the legislative chambers considered competitive were held by Democrats.

Ratings are designated as follows:

- "Tossup": Competitive, no advantage
- "Lean": Competitive, slight advantage
- "Likely": Not competitive, but opposition could make significant gains
- "Safe": Not competitive at all

State	PVI	Chamber	Last election	Governing Oct. 20, 2014	Result
Alabama	R+12	Senate	R 22–12–1	Safe R	R 26–8–1
Alabama	R+12	House of Representatives	R 62–43	Safe R	R 72–33
Alaska	R+12	Senate	R 13–7	Likely R	R 14–6
Alaska	R+12	House of Representatives	R 26–14	Safe R	R 23–16–1
Arizona	R+7	Senate	R 17–13	Likely R	R 17–13
Arizona	R+7	House of Representatives	R 36–24	Likely R	R 38–22
Arkansas	R+14	Senate	R 21–14	Safe R	R 24–11
Arkansas	R+14	House of Representatives	R 51–48–1	Lean R	R 64–36
California	D+9	State Senate	D 29–11	Safe D	D 26–14
California	D+9	State Assembly	D 56–24	Safe D	D 52–28
Colorado	D+1	Senate	D 20–15	Tossup	R 18–17
Colorado	D+1	House of Representatives	D 37–28	Lean D	D 34–31
Connecticut	D+7	State Senate	D 22–14	Safe D	D 21–15
Connecticut	D+7	House of Representatives	D 98–53	Safe D	D 87–64
Delaware	D+8	Senate	D 13–8	Safe D	D 12–9
Delaware	D+8	House of Representatives	D 27–14	Safe D	D 25–16
Florida	R+2	Senate	R 26–14	Safe R	R 26–14
Florida	R+2	House of Representatives	R 76–44	Safe R	R 81–39
Georgia	R+6	State Senate	R 38–18	Safe R	R 38–18
Georgia	R+6	House of Representatives	R 119–60–1	Safe R	R 119–60–1
Hawaii	D+20	Senate	D 24–1	Safe D	D 24–1
Hawaii	D+20	House of Representatives	D 44–7	Safe D	D 43–8
Idaho	R+18	Senate	R 29–6	Safe R	R 28–7
Idaho	R+18	House of Representatives	R 57–13	Safe R	R 56–14
Illinois	D+8	Senate	D 40–19	Safe D	D 39–20
Illinois	D+8	House of Representatives	D 71–47	Safe D	D 71–47
Indiana	R+5	Senate	R 37–13	Safe R	R 40–10
Indiana	R+5	House of Representatives	R 69–31	Safe R	R 71–29
Iowa	D+1	Senate	D 26–24	Tossup	D 26–24
Iowa	D+1	House of Representatives	R 53–47	Lean R	R 57–43
Kansas	R+12	House of Representatives	R 92–33	Likely R	R 97–28
Kentucky	R+13	Senate	R 23–14–1	Safe R	R 26–12
Kentucky	R+13	House of Representatives	D 55–45	Tossup	D 54–46
Maine	D+6	Senate	D 19–15–1	Lean D	R 20–15
Maine	D+6	House of Representatives	D 89–58–4	Likely D	D 78–68–5
Maryland	D+10	Senate	D 35–12	Safe D	D 33–14
Maryland	D+10	House of Representatives	D 98–43	Safe D	D 91–50
Massachusetts	D+10	Senate	D 36–4	Safe D	D 34–6
Massachusetts	D+10	House of Representatives	D 131–29	Safe D	D 125–35
Michigan	D+4	Senate	R 26–12	Safe R	R 27–11
Michigan	D+4	House of Representatives	R 59–51	Lean R	R 63–47
Minnesota	D+2	House of Representatives	D 73–61	Lean D	R 72–62
Missouri	R+5	Senate	R 24–10	Safe R	R 25–9
Missouri	R+5	House of Representatives	R 110–53	Safe R	R 117–45–1
Montana	R+7	Senate	R 27–23	Likely R	R 29–21
Montana	R+7	House of Representatives	R 61–39	Safe R	R 59–41
Nevada	D+2	Senate	D 11–10	Tossup	R 11–10
Nevada	D+2	Assembly	D 27–15	Likely D	R 27–15
New Hampshire	D+1	Senate	R 13–11	Lean R	R 14–10
New Hampshire	D+1	House of Representatives	D 221–179	Lean R (flip)	R 239–160–1
New Mexico	D+4	House of Representatives	D 38–32	Tossup	R 37–33
New York	D+11	State Senate	Coal. 36–27	Tossup	R 32–31
New York	D+11	State Assembly	D 105–44–1	Safe D	D 105–43–1–1
North Carolina	R+3	Senate	R 32–18	Likely R	R 34–16
North Carolina	R+3	House of Representatives	R 77–43	Likely R	R 74–46
North Dakota	R+10	Senate	R 33–14	Safe R	R 32–15
North Dakota	R+10	House of Representatives	R 71–23	Safe R	R 71–23
Ohio	R+1	Senate	R 23–10	Safe R	R 23–10
Ohio	R+1	House of Representatives	R 60–39	Safe R	R 65–34
Oklahoma	R+19	Senate	R 36–12	Safe R	R 40–8
Oklahoma	R+19	House of Representatives	R 72–29	Safe R	R 72–29
Oregon	D+5	State Senate	D 16–14	Lean D	D 18–12
Oregon	D+5	House of Representatives	D 34–26	Likely D	D 34–26
Pennsylvania	D+1	State Senate	R 27–23	Likely R	R 30–20
Pennsylvania	D+1	House of Representatives	R 111–92	Likely R	R 119–84
Rhode Island	D+11	Senate	D 32–5–1	Safe D	D 32–5–1
Rhode Island	D+11	House of Representatives	D 69–6	Safe D	D 63–12
South Carolina	R+8	House of Representatives	R 78–46	Safe R	R 78–46
South Dakota	R+10	Senate	R 28–7	Safe R	R 27–8
South Dakota	R+10	House of Representatives	R 53–17	Safe R	R 58–12
Tennessee	R+12	Senate	R 26–7	Safe R	R 28–5
Tennessee	R+12	House of Representatives	R 71–27–1	Safe R	R 73–26
Texas	R+10	Senate	R 19–12	Safe R	R 20–11
Texas	R+10	House of Representatives	R 95–55	Safe R	R 98–52
Utah	R+22	State Senate	R 24–5	Safe R	R 24–5
Utah	R+22	House of Representatives	R 61–14	Safe R	R 63–12
Vermont	D+18	Senate	D 21–7–2	Safe D	D 19–9–2
Vermont	D+18	House of Representatives	D 96–45–5–4	Safe D	D 85–53–6–6
Washington	D+5	State Senate	Coal. 26–23	Lean R	Coal. 26–23
Washington	D+5	House of Representatives	D 55–43	Likely D	D 50–48
West Virginia	R+13	Senate	D 25–9	Likely D	R 18–16 (Note: Includes a post-election party switch by Senator Daniel Hall which gave Republicans control of the chamber.)
West Virginia	R+13	House of Delegates	D 54–46	Tossup	R 64–36
Wisconsin	D+2	Senate	R 18–15	Lean R	R 19–14
Wisconsin	D+2	State Assembly	R 60–39	Safe R	R 63–36
Wyoming	R+22	Senate	R 26–4	Safe R	R 26–4
Wyoming	R+22	House of Representatives	R 52–8	Safe R	R 51–9

== Maps ==
Upper house seats by party holding majority in each state
Republican 50–60% 60–70% 70–80% 80–90%	Democratic 50–60% 60–70% 70–80% 80–90% 90–100%

Lower house seats by party holding majority in each state
Republican 50–60% 60–70% 70–80% 80–90%	Democratic 50–60% 60–70% 70–80% 80–90%

Net changes to upper house seats after the 2014 elections
+1 Rep seat +2 Rep seats +3–5 Rep seats +9 Rep seats
+1 Dem seat +2 Dem seats

Net changes to lower house seats after the 2014 elections
+1 Rep seat +2 Rep seats +3–5 Rep seats
+6–13 Rep seats +17 Rep seats +60 Rep seats
+1 Dem seat +2 Dem seats +3 Dem seats
+1 Con seat

== State Summaries ==
=== Alabama ===
All of the seats of the Alabama Legislature were up for election. Republicans maintained control of both state legislative chambers.

Alabama Senate
Party	Before	After	Change
Republican	23	26	▲3
Independent	1	1	Steady
Democratic	11	8	▼3
Total	35	35	

Alabama House of Representatives
Party	Before	After	Change
Republican	67	72	▲5
Independent	1	0	▼1
Democratic	37	33	▼4
Total	105	105	

=== Alaska ===
All of the seats of the Alaska House of Representatives and half of the Alaska Senate were up for election. Republicans maintained control of both state legislative chambers.

Alaska Senate
Party	Before	After	Change
Republican	13	14	▲1
Democratic	2	1	▼1
Democratic	5	5	▼1
Total	20	20	

Alaska House of Representatives
Party	Before	After	Change
Republican	26	23	▼3
Democratic	4	4	▲2
Democratic	10	12	▲2
Independent	0	1	▲1
Total	40	40	

=== Arizona ===
All of the seats of the Arizona Legislature were up for election. Republicans maintained control of both state legislative chambers.

Arizona Senate
Party	Before	After	Change
Republican	17	17	Steady
Democratic	13	13	Steady
Total	30	30	

Arizona House of Representatives
Party	Before	After	Change
Republican	36	38	▲2
Democratic	24	22	▼2
Total	60	60	

=== Arkansas ===
All of the seats of the Arkansas House of Representatives and half of the Arkansas Senate were up for election. Republicans maintained control of both state legislative chambers.

Arkansas Senate
Party	Before	After	Change
Republican	22	24	▲2
Democratic	13	11	▼2
Total	35	35	

Arkansas House of Representatives
Party	Before	After	Change
Republican	51	64	▲13
Democratic	48	36	▼12
Green	1	0	▼1
Total	100	100	

=== California ===
All of the seats of the California House of Representatives and half of the California Senate were up for election. Democrats maintained control of both state legislative chambers.

California State Senate
Party	Before	After	Change
Democratic	28	26	▼2
Republican	12	14	▲2
Total	40	40	

California State Assembly
Party	Before	After	Change
Democratic	55	52	▼3
Republican	25	28	▲3
Total	80	80	

=== Colorado ===
All of the seats of the Colorado House of Representatives and half of the Colorado Senate were up for election. Republicans won control of the Senate and Democrats maintained control of the House of Representatives.

Colorado Senate
Party	Before	After	Change
Republican	17	18	▲1
Democratic	18	17	▼1
Total	35	35	

Colorado House of Representatives
Party	Before	After	Change
Democratic	37	34	▼3
Republican	28	31	▲3
Total	65	65	

=== Connecticut ===
All of the seats of the Connecticut Legislature were up for election. Democrats maintained control of both state legislative chambers.

Connecticut State Senate
Party	Before	After	Change
Democratic	22	21	▼1
Republican	14	15	▲1
Total	36	36	

Connecticut House of Representatives
Party	Before	After	Change
Democratic	97	87	▼10
Republican	54	64	▲10
Total	151	151	

=== Delaware ===
All of the seats of the Delaware House of Representatives and half of the Delaware Senate were up for election. Democrats maintained control of both state legislative chambers.

Delaware Senate
Party	Before	After	Change
Democratic	13	12	▼1
Republican	8	9	▲1
Total	21	21	

Delaware House of Representatives
Party	Before	After	Change
Democratic	27	25	▼2
Republican	14	16	▲2
Total	41	41	

=== Florida ===
All of the seats of the Florida House of Representatives and half of the Florida Senate were up for election. Republicans maintained control of both state legislative chambers.

Florida Senate
Party	Before	After	Change
Republican	26	26	Steady
Democratic	14	14	Steady
Total	40	40	

Florida House of Representatives
Party	Before	After	Change
Republican	75	81	▲6
Democratic	45	39	▼6
Total	120	120	

=== Georgia ===
All of the seats of the Georgia Legislature were up for election. Republicans maintained control of both state legislative chambers.

Georgia State Senate
Party	Before	After	Change
Republican	38	38	Steady
Democratic	18	18	Steady
Total	56	56	

Georgia House of Representatives
Party	Before	After	Change
Republican	119	119	Steady
Democratic	60	60	Steady
Independent	1	1	Steady
Total	180	180	

=== Hawaii ===
All of the seats of the Hawaii House of Representatives and half of the Hawaii Senate were up for election. Democrats maintained control of both state legislative chambers.

Hawaii Senate
Party	Before	After	Change
Democratic	24	24	Steady
Republican	1	1	Steady
Total	25	25	

Hawaii House of Representatives
Party	Before	After	Change
Democratic	44	43	▼1
Republican	7	8	▲1
Total	51	51	

=== Idaho ===
All of the seats of the Idaho Legislature were up for election. Republicans maintained control of both state legislative chambers.

Idaho Senate
Party	Before	After	Change
Republican	28	28	Steady
Democratic	7	7	Steady
Total	35	35	

Idaho House of Representatives
Party	Before	After	Change
Republican	57	56	▼1
Democratic	13	14	▲1
Total	70	70	

=== Illinois ===
All of the seats of the Illinois House of Representatives and one third of the Illinois Senate were up for election. Democrats maintained control of both state legislative chambers.

Illinois Senate
Party	Before	After	Change
Democratic	40	39	▼1
Republican	19	20	▲1
Total	59	59	

Illinois House of Representatives
Party	Before	After	Change
Democratic	71	71	Steady
Republican	47	47	Steady
Total	118	118	

=== Indiana ===
All of the seats of the Indiana House of Representatives and half of the Indiana Senate were up for election. Republicans maintained control of both state legislative chambers.

Indiana Senate
Party	Before	After	Change
Republican	37	40	▲3
Democratic	13	10	▼3
Total	50	50	

Indiana House of Representatives
Party	Before	After	Change
Republican	69	71	▲2
Democratic	31	29	▼2
Total	100	100	

=== Iowa ===
All of the seats of the Iowa House of Representatives and half of the Iowa Senate were up for election. Republicans maintained control of the House of Representatives and Democrats maintained control of the Senate.

Iowa Senate
Party	Before	After	Change
Democratic	26	26	Steady
Republican	24	24	Steady
Total	50	50	

Iowa House of Representatives
Party	Before	After	Change
Republican	53	57	▲4
Democratic	47	43	▼4
Total	100	100	

=== Kansas ===
All of the seats of the Kansas House of Representatives. Republicans maintained control of both state legislative chambers.

Kansas House of Representatives
Party	Before	After	Change
Republican	93	97	▲4
Democratic	32	28	▼4
Total	125	125	

=== Kentucky ===
All of the seats of the Kentucky House of Representatives and half of the Kentucky Senate were up for election. Republicans maintained control of the Senate and Democrats maintained control of the House of Representatives.

Kentucky Senate
Party	Before	After	Change
Republican	23	26	▲3
Democratic	14	12	▼2
Independent	1	0	▼1
Total	38	38	

Kentucky House of Representatives
Party	Before	After	Change
Democratic	54	54	Steady
Republican	46	46	Steady
Total	100	100	

=== Maine ===
All of the seats of the Maine Legislature were up for election. Republicans won control of the Senate and Democrats maintained control of the House of Representatives.

Maine Senate
Party	Before	After	Change
Republican	15	20	▲5
Democratic	19	15	▼4
Independent	1	0	▼1
Total	35	35	

Maine House of Representatives
Party	Before	After	Change
Democratic	89	78	▼11
Republican	58	68	▲10
Independent	4	5	▲1
Total	151	151	

=== Maryland ===
All of the seats of the Maryland Legislature were up for election. Democrats maintained control of both state legislative chambers.

Maryland Senate
Party	Before	After	Change
Democratic	35	33	▼2
Republican	12	14	▲2
Total	37	37	

Maryland House of Delegates
Party	Before	After	Change
Democratic	98	91	▼7
Republican	43	50	▲7
Total	141	141	

=== Massachusetts ===
All of the seats of the Massachusetts Legislature were up for election. Democrats maintained control of both state legislative chambers.

Massachusetts Senate
Party	Before	After	Change
Democratic	36	34	▼2
Republican	4	6	▲2
Total	40	40	

Massachusetts House of Representatives
Party	Before	After	Change
Democratic	131	125	▼6
Republican	29	35	▲6
Total	160	160	

=== Michigan ===
All of the seats of the Michigan Legislature were up for election. Republicans maintained control of both state legislative chambers.

Michigan Senate
Party	Before	After	Change
Republican	26	27	▲1
Democratic	12	11	▼1
Total	34	34	

Michigan House of Representatives
Party	Before	After	Change
Republican	59	63	▲4
Democratic	51	47	▼4
Total	110	110	

=== Minnesota ===
All of the seats of the Minnesota House of Representatives were up for election. Republicans won control of the House of Representatives.

Minnesota House of Representatives
Party	Before	After	Change
Republican	61	72	▲11
Democratic (DFL)	73	62	▼11
Total	134	134	

=== Missouri ===
All of the seats of the Missouri House of Representatives and half of the Missouri Senate were up for election. Republicans maintained control of both state legislative chambers.

Missouri Senate
Party	Before	After	Change
Republican	25	25	Steady
Democratic	9	9	Steady
Total	34	34	

Missouri House of Representatives
Party	Before	After	Change
Republican	110	117	▲7
Democratic	53	45	▼8
Independent	0	1	▲1
Total	163	163	

=== Montana ===
All of the seats of the Montana House of Representatives and half of the Montana Senate were up for election. Republicans maintained control of both state legislative chambers.

Montana Senate
Party	Before	After	Change
Republican	29	29	Steady
Democratic	21	21	Steady
Total	50	50	

Montana House of Representatives
Party	Before	After	Change
Republican	61	59	▼2
Democratic	39	41	▲2
Total	100	100	

=== Nebraska ===
Nebraska is the only U.S. state with a unicameral legislature; half of the seats of the Nebraska Legislature were up for election in 2014. Nebraska is also unique in that its legislature is officially non-partisan and holds non-partisan elections, although the Democratic and Republican parties each endorse legislative candidates. Republicans maintained control.

Nebraska Legislature
Party	Before	After	Change
Republican	30	35	▲5
Democratic	18	13	▼5
Independent	1	1	Steady
Total	49	49	

=== Nevada ===
All of the seats of the Nevada House of Representatives and half of the Nevada Senate were up for election. Republicans won control of both state legislative chambers.

Nevada Senate
Party	Before	After	Change
Republican	10	11	▲1
Democratic	11	10	▼1
Total	21	21	

Nevada Assembly
Party	Before	After	Change
Republican	15	27	▲12
Democratic	27	15	▼12
Total	42	42	

=== New Hampshire ===
All of the seats of the New Hampshire House of Representatives and half of the New Hampshire Senate were up for election. Republicans maintained control of the Senate and won control of the House of Representatives.

New Hampshire Senate
Party	Before	After	Change
Republican	13	14	▲1
Democratic	11	10	▼1
Total	24	24	

New Hampshire House of Representatives
Party	Before	After	Change
Republican	179	239	▲60
Democratic	221	160	▼61
Independent	0	1	▲1
Total	400	400	

=== New Mexico ===
All of the seats of the New Mexico House of Representatives. Republicans won control of the chamber.

New Mexico House of Representatives
Party	Before	After	Change
Republican	33	37	▲4
Democratic	37	33	▼4
Total	70	70	

=== New York ===
All of the seats of the New York Legislature were up for election. Republicans replaced a Republican-led coalition in the Senate, and Democrats maintained control of the Assembly.

New York State Senate
Party	Before	After	Change
Republican	30	32	▲2
Democratic	6 (Note: 5 members of the Independent Democratic Caucus as well as Democrat Simcha Felder.)	6	Steady
Democratic	27	25	▼2
Total	63	63	

New York State Assembly
Party	Before	After	Change
Democratic	105	105	Steady
Republican	44	43	▼1
Independence	1	1	Steady
Conservative	0	1	▲1
Total	150	150	

=== North Carolina ===
All of the seats of the North Carolina House of Representatives and half of the North Carolina Senate were up for election. Republicans maintained control of both state legislative chambers.

North Carolina Senate
Party	Before	After	Change
Republican	33	34	▲1
Democratic	17	16	▼1
Total	50	50	

North Carolina House of Representatives
Party	Before	After	Change
Republican	77	74	▼3
Democratic	43	46	▲3
Total	120	120	

=== North Dakota ===
All of the seats of the North Dakota House of Representatives and half of the North Dakota Senate were up for election. Republicans maintained control of both state legislative chambers.

North Dakota Senate
Party	Before	After	Change
Republican	33	32	▼1
Democratic-NPL	14	15	▲1
Total	47	47	

North Dakota House of Representatives
Party	Before	After	Change
Republican	71	71	Steady
Democratic-NPL	23	23	Steady
Total	94	94	

=== Ohio ===
All of the seats of the Ohio House of Representatives and half of the Ohio Senate were up for election. Republicans maintained control of both state legislative chambers.

Ohio Senate
Party	Before	After	Change
Republican	23	23	Steady
Democratic	10	10	Steady
Total	33	33	

Ohio House of Representatives
Party	Before	After	Change
Republican	60	65	▲5
Democratic	39	34	▼5
Total	99	99	

=== Oklahoma ===
All of the seats of the Oklahoma House of Representatives and half of the Oklahoma Senate were up for election. Republicans maintained control of both state legislative chambers.

Oklahoma Senate
Party	Before	After	Change
Republican	36	40	▲4
Democratic	12	8	▼4
Total	48	48	

Oklahoma House of Representatives
Party	Before	After	Change
Republican	72	72	Steady
Democratic	29	29	Steady
Total	101	101	

=== Oregon ===
All of the seats of the Oregon House of Representatives and half of the Oregon Senate were up for election. Democrats maintained control of both state legislative chambers.

Oregon State Senate
Party	Before	After	Change
Democratic	16	18	▲2
Republican	14	12	▼2
Total	30	30	

Oregon House of Representatives
Party	Before	After	Change
Democratic	34	34	Steady
Republican	26	26	Steady
Total	50	50	

=== Pennsylvania ===
All of the seats of the Pennsylvania House of Representatives and half of the Pennsylvania Senate were up for election. Republicans maintained control of both state legislative chambers.

Pennsylvania State Senate
Party	Before	After	Change
Republican	27	30	▲3
Democratic	23	20	▼3
Total	50	50	

Pennsylvania House of Representatives
Party	Before	After	Change
Republican	112	119	▲7
Democratic	91	84	▼7
Total	203	203	

=== Rhode Island ===
All of the seats of the Rhode Island Legislature were up for election. Democrats maintained control of both state legislative chambers.

Rhode Island Senate
Party	Before	After	Change
Democratic	32	32	Steady
Republican	5	5	Steady
Independent	1	1	Steady
Total	38	38	

Rhode Island House of Representatives
Party	Before	After	Change
Democratic	69	63	▼6
Republican	6	11	▲5
Independent	0	1	▲1
Total	75	75	

=== South Carolina ===
All of the seats of the South Carolina House of Representatives were up for election. Republicans maintained control of both state legislative chambers.

South Carolina House of Representatives
Party	Before	After	Change
Republican	78	78	Steady
Democratic	46	46	Steady
Total	124	124	

=== South Dakota ===
All of the seats of the South Dakota Legislature were up for election. Republicans maintained control of both state legislative chambers.

South Dakota Senate
Party	Before	After	Change
Republican	28	27	▼1
Democratic	7	8	▲1
Total	35	35	

South Dakota House of Representatives
Party	Before	After	Change
Republican	53	58	▲5
Democratic	17	12	▼5
Total	70	70	

=== Tennessee ===
All of the seats of the Tennessee House of Representatives and half of the Tennessee Senate were up for election. Republicans maintained control of both state legislative chambers.

Tennessee Senate
Party	Before	After	Change
Republican	26	28	▲2
Democratic	7	5	▼2
Total	33	33	

Tennessee House of Representatives
Party	Before	After	Change
Republican	71	73	▲2
Democratic	27	26	▼1
Independent Republican	1	0	▼1
Total	99	99	

=== Texas ===
All of the seats of the Texas House of Representatives and half of the Texas Senate were up for election. Republicans maintained control of both state legislative chambers.

Texas Senate
Party	Before	After	Change
Republican	19	20	▲1
Democratic	12	11	▼1
Total	31	31	

Texas House of Representatives
Party	Before	After	Change
Republican	95	98	▲3
Democratic	55	52	▼3
Total	150	150	

=== Utah ===
All of the seats of the Utah House of Representatives and half of the Utah Senate were up for election. Republicans maintained control of both state legislative chambers.

Utah State Senate
Party	Before	After	Change
Republican	24	24	Steady
Democratic	5	5	Steady
Total	29	29	

Utah House of Representatives
Party	Before	After	Change
Republican	61	63	▲2
Democratic	14	12	▼2
Total	75	75	

=== Vermont ===
All of the seats of the Vermont Legislature were up for election. Democrats maintained control of both state legislative chambers.

Vermont Senate
Party	Before	After	Change
Democratic	21	19	▼2
Republican	7	9	▲2
Progressive	2	2	Steady
Total	30	30	

Vermont House of Representatives
Party	Before	After	Change
Democratic	96	85	▼11
Republican	45	53	▲8
Progressive	5	6	▲1
Independent	4	6	▲2
Total	150	150	

=== Washington ===
All of the seats of the Washington House of Representatives and half of the Washington Senate were up for election. Republicans maintained coalition control of the Senate and Democrats maintained control of the House of Representatives.

Washington State Senate
Party	Before	After	Change
Republican	24	25	▲1
Democratic	2 (Note: Two Democrats caucused with the Republican majority.)	1 (Note: One Democrat caucused with the Republican majority.)	▼1
Democratic	23	23	▼1
Total	49	49	

Washington House of Representatives
Party	Before	After	Change
Democratic	55	50	▼5
Republican	43	48	▲5
Total	98	98	

=== West Virginia ===
All of the seats of the West Virginia House of Delegates and half of the West Virginia Senate were up for election. Republicans initially won control of the House of Delegates and tied the Senate, but the defection of Democratic senator Daniel Hall the day after the election gave Republicans control of the chamber.

West Virginia Senate
Party	Before	After	Change
Republican	9	18	▲9
Democratic	25	16	▼9
Total	34	34	

West Virginia House of Delegates
Party	Before	After	Change
Republican	47	64	▲17
Democratic	53	36	▼17
Total	100	100	

=== Wisconsin ===
All of the seats of the Wisconsin Assembly and half of the Wisconsin Senate were up for election. Republicans maintained control of both state legislative chambers.

Wisconsin Senate
Party	Before	After	Change
Republican	18	19	▲1
Democratic	15	14	▼1
Total	33	33	

Wisconsin State Assembly
Party	Before	After	Change
Republican	60	63	▲3
Democratic	39	36	▼3
Total	99	99	

=== Wyoming ===
All of the seats of the Wyoming House of Representatives and half of the Wyoming Senate were up for election. Republicans maintained control of both state legislative chambers.

Wyoming Senate
Party	Before	After	Change
Republican	26	26	Steady
Democratic	4	4	Steady
Total	30	30	

Wyoming House of Representatives
Party	Before	After	Change
Republican	52	51	▼1
Democratic	8	9	▲1
Total	60	60	

== Territorial and federal district summaries ==
=== American Samoa ===
All of the seats of the American Samoa Senate and the American Samoa House of Representatives were up for election. Members of the Senate serve four-year terms, while members of the House of Representatives serve two-year terms. Gubernatorial and legislative elections are conducted on a nonpartisan basis in American Samoa.

=== Guam ===
Guam Legislature
Party	Before	After	Change
Democratic	9	9	Steady
Republican	6	6	Steady
Total	15	15	

=== Northern Mariana Islands ===
Northern Mariana Islands Senate
Party	Before	After	Change
Republican	5	7	▲2
Independent	4	2	▼2
Democratic	0	0	Steady
Total	9	9	

Northern Mariana Islands House of Representatives
Party	Before	After	Change
Republican	4	7	▲3
Democratic	4	0	▼4
Independent	12	13	▲1
Total	20	20	

=== U.S. Virgin Islands ===
Virgin Islands Legislature
Party	Before	After	Change
Democratic	10	10	Steady
Independent	5	5	Steady
Total	15	15	

=== Washington, D.C. ===
District of Columbia Council
Party	Before	After	Change
Democratic	11	11	Steady
Independent	2	2	Steady
Total	13	13	

== Special elections ==
=== Virginia ===
Although Democrats briefly gained control of the Virginia Senate due to the election of Democratic lieutenant governor Ralph Northam, Republicans gained control back in an August special election.

District		Incumbent			This race	
Chamber	No.	Representative	Party	First elected	Results	Candidates
Senate	33	Mark Herring	Democratic	2006 (special)	Incumbent resigned January 11, 2014 to become Attorney general of Virginia. New member elected January 7, 2014. Democratic hold.	▌ ✓ Jennifer Wexton (Democratic) 52.7%; ▌John Whitbeck (Republican) 37.5%; ▌Joe Turner May (Independent) 9.8%
Senate	6	Ralph Northam	Democratic	2007	Incumbent resigned January 11, 2014, to become Lieutenant governor of Virginia. New member elected January 21, 2014. Democratic hold.	▌ ✓ Lynwood Lewis (Democratic) 50.0%; ▌Burwell Coleman (Republican) 50.0%
Senate	38	Phillip Puckett	Democratic	1998 (special)	Incumbent resigned June 9, 2014. New member elected August 19, 2014. Republican gain.	▌ ✓ Ben Chafin (Republican) 59.6%; ▌Dean Hymes (Democratic) 31.8%; ▌Ricky Mullins (Independent) 8.6%
Senate	16	Henry L. Marsh	Democratic	1991	Incumbent resigned July 3, 2014 to take a seat on the Alcoholic Beverage Control Board. New member elected November 4, 2014. Democratic hold.	▌ ✓ Rosalyn Dance (Democratic) 73.0%; ▌Preston Brown (Independent) 25.4%; ▌Write-in 1.6%
