= Harry Carter Stuart =

American politician (1893–1963)

Member of the Virginia Senate from the 18th district
- In office January 10, 1940 – September 20, 1963
- Preceded by: Jack W. Witten
- Succeeded by: George F. Barnes

Personal details
- Born: Henry Carter Stuart; July 4, 1893 Abingdon, Virginia, US
- Died: September 20, 1963 (aged 70) Virginia, US
- Spouse: Marion Lee Cobbs Stuart
- Parent(s): Dale Carter Stuart and Sally Preston White Stuart
- Relatives: Henry Carter Stuart (uncle)
- Profession: Cattleman, farmer

Henry Carter Stuart (July 4, 1893 – September 20, 1963), better known as Harry Carter Stuart, was a Virginia cattle breeder and trader, who also served as the Democratic State Senator from the 18th District. A lifelong Democrat, Carter helped lead the Byrd Organization's policy of Massive Resistance to racial integration in Virginia's public schools.

== Early life and education ==
Henry Carter Stuart was born in Abingdon, Virginia, to Dale Carter Stuart (1858-1934) and his wife Sally Preston White Stuart (1871-1931). His uncle Henry Carter Stuart (who served as Governor of Virginia during World War I) operated the Stuart Land and Cattle Company along with Harry's father and his uncle Zed (Alexander). Their family's cattle company (the 17th oldest business in the country) was the largest ranching operation east of the Mississippi river for nearly a century. Harry had a brother, John W. Stuart (1895-1947), who served as U.S. Marshal for the Western District of Virginia during the Franklin D. Roosevelt administration.

Stuart studied at the Cluster Springs Academy, Virginia Military Institute and for a year at Hampden-Sydney College. He married Marion Lee Cobbs Stuart (1897 - 1984)

== Career ==
Stuart began his career as a livestock dealer in 1909, with the family's Stuart Land & Cattle Company. During World War I, he served with the U.S. Army Infantry's 81st Division overseas. The huge cattle and farming operations, the oldest in the country, employed thousands of local people in several southwest Virginia counties. Stuart was active in many dairymen's associations, the Elk Gardens Farm Products Corporation, the Virginia Beef Cattle Breeders Association, and a steward in the Methodist Church. The Future Farmers of America gave him an award in 1959.

He lived in a mansion called Rosedale in Elk Garden, which his uncle Governor H. C. Stuart had built, but which burned down as a result of lightning strikes in a 2012 storm.

== Political career ==
Stuart was affiliated with the Byrd Organization. In 1940, voters of Buchanan, Russell and Tazewell Counties elected him to the Virginia State Senate, District 18, replacing Jack W. Witten. He was re-elected six times, serving until his death shortly before the special session in 1963.

In 1956, Stuart assisted the Massive Resistance policy of U.S. Senator Harry F. Byrd over integration of Virginia's public schools by introducing an interposition resolution, asserting Virginia's sovereignty against encroachment by the federal government. That reacted against the United States Supreme Court decisions in Brown v. Board of Education (and companion cases including one from Prince Edward County, Virginia) in 1954 and 1955. Though Virginia' official response to Brown was a commission under State Senator Garland Gray to study options, Gray, Stuart and U.S. Senator Byrd (and others) became radicalized. When the legislature finally met in August 1956, it debated a radicalized segregationist version of the Gray Commission plan, which became known as the Stanley Plan. That in part proposed to fund segregation academies through tuition grants, and was sponsored by Stuart in the Virginia Senate as well as delegate H. Stuart Carter of Washington County and Bristol in the House of Delegates, although opposed by his cousin state senator Stuart B. Carter.

== Death and legacy ==
Stuart died shortly before the 1963 special legislative session and was replaced by George F. Barnes. However, after the 1964 reapportionment, the district renumbered the 17th was represented by Donald A. McGlothin Sr., although the district boundaries were again redrawn for the 1966 election and Barnes won election to the 16th District (Buchanan, Smyth and Tazewell counties) and Macon M. Long was elected to the 15th District (Dickenson, Russell, Wise and Norton Counties). Almost all of these counties are now in the 38th District.

In 1984, Marion Stuart was interred beside Stuart at the Russell Memorial Cemetery in Lebanon, Virginia. His father Dale C. Stuart and uncle Governor H.C. Stuart are also buried there, but his opponent cousin in the Massive Resistance battle, Stuart B. Carter is buried in Fairview cemetery in Buchanan, Virginia.
