= Don McGlothlin =

American lawyer and politician (1926–2000)

Member of the Virginia House of Delegates
- In office February 1974 – January 10, 1990
- Preceded by: Keith D. Speer
- Succeeded by: Jackie Stump
- Constituency: 15th district (1968‍–‍1972); 3rd district (1972‍–‍1983); 4th district (1983‍–‍1990)

Member of the Virginia Senate from the 18th district
- In office January 8, 1964 – January 12, 1966
- Preceded by: George F. Barnes
- Succeeded by: George F. Barnes

Commonwealth's Attorney for Buchanan County
- In office January 1, 1956 – December 31, 1963
- Preceded by: W. C. Dennis
- Succeeded by: Gerald P. Coleman

Personal details
- Born: Donald Allen McGlothlin; February 16, 1926 Honaker, Virginia, U.S.
- Died: February 20, 2000 (aged 74) Grundy, Virginia, U.S.
- Party: Democratic
- Spouse: Mary Louise Williams (m. 1947)
- Children: 5
- Education: Franklin & Marshall College (BA); William & Mary Law School (BCL)
- Occupation: Lawyer; farmer; politician

Military service
- Branch/service: United States Navy; United States Army; Army Reserve
- Years of service: 1943‍–‍1946 (USN)
- Battles/wars: World War II; Korean War

Donald Allen McGlothlin Sr. (February 16, 1926 – February 20, 2000) was an American lawyer and Democratic Party politician, who served as the commonwealth's attorney of Buchanan County, Virginia and as a member of both houses of the Virginia General Assembly. He was defeated for reelection by write-in candidate Jackie Stump.
