= Daniel W. Bird Jr. =

American attorney and politician (born 1938)

Danny Bird
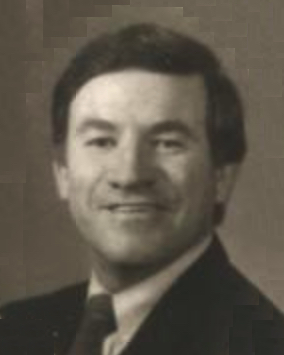

Member of the Virginia Senate from the 38th district
- In office January 14, 1976 – January 8, 1992
- Preceded by: George F. Barnes
- Succeeded by: Jackson Reasor

Personal details
- Born: Daniel Woodrow Bird Jr. December 26, 1938 (age 87) Bland, Virginia, U.S.
- Party: Democratic
- Spouse: Barbara Joan McEldowney
- Parent: D. Woodrow Bird (father)
- Education: Virginia Tech (BS); Washington and Lee University (LLB)

Military service
- Allegiance: United States
- Branch/service: United States Army
- Rank: Captain

Daniel Woodrow Bird Jr. (born December 26, 1938) is an American attorney and politician who served as a member of the Virginia Senate from 1976 to 1992. He mounted an unsuccessful bid for Governor in 1989, dropping out and supporting Douglas Wilder before the Democratic primary.

His father, D. Woodrow Bird, served for many years in the General Assembly.
