= George F. Barnes =

American politician (1919–2004)

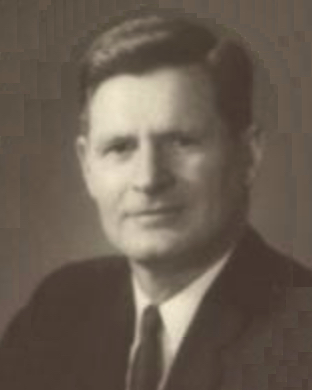

Member of the Virginia Senate
- In office January 12, 1966 – January 14, 1976
- Preceded by: Don McGlothlin
- Succeeded by: Danny Bird
- Constituency: 16th district (1966‍–‍1972); 38th district (1972‍–‍1976)
- In office November 1963 – January 8, 1964
- Preceded by: Harry C. Stuart
- Succeeded by: Don McGlothlin
- Constituency: 18th district

Personal details
- Born: George Francis Barnes; May 25, 1919 Pocahontas, Virginia, U.S.
- Died: March 15, 2004 (aged 84) Roanoke, Virginia, U.S.
- Party: Republican
- Spouse: Grace Gillespie
- Education: Virginia Tech (BS)

Military service
- Branch/service: U.S. Merchant Marine
- Battles/wars: World War II

George Francis Barnes (May 25, 1919 – March 15, 2004) was an American businessman and politician aligned with the Republican Party, who served in the Virginia state senate briefly in 1963 and then again from 1966 until his defeat ten years later.

== Early life, education and military service ==
Born in Pocahontas, Virginia, he was named after his father, educated at Virginia Tech, then served in the merchant marines during World War II.

== Career ==
Following the conflict, in addition to farming in Tazewell County, Barnes operated an independent coal mining company. He served as President of the Tazewell County Farm Bureau and as vice president of the National Independent Coal Operators Association.

Barnes won his first election in 1963, following the death of longtime state senator Harry C. Stuart, a Democrat who aligned with the Byrd Organization during Massive Resistance. Although Barnes failed to win re-election initially in 1964 (the district's number changing), two years later voters again elected Barnes to the Virginia state senate. He won re-election several times, despite further district boundary and number changes, in light of the U.S. Supreme Court's one man/one vote jurisprudence (which also led to the state senate's expansion from 33 seats including multi-member districts to 40 single-member seats) as well as population changes reflected in federal censuses. Thus, Barnes won the special election to represent the 18th district, which included Buchanan, Russell and Tazewell counties, but within a year lost the next general election (when the same counties were temporarily renamed the 17th district) to Democrat and attorney Donald A. McGlothlin Sr. (whose senatorial career ended in the next rearrangement, but who would serve Buchanan County for two decades in the Virginia House of Delegates). In November 1965 Barnes won election to the new 16th senatorial district which now included Buchanan and Smyth together with Tazewell County. Barnes's last district (beginning in 1972), Virginia's 38th Senate district, lost Buchanan and Smyth Counties but gained Bland, Craig, Giles, Pulaski and Wythe Counties. Smyth County moved to the 39th District, to which prominent prosecutor and later state judge George M. Warren Jr. was elected and re-elected several times (and with his father would be the namesake of the Bristol Justice Center), and Buchanan County was added to the 40th District, to which Democrat Dr. John C. Buchanan was elected. Senator Barnes was succeeded by Democrat Daniel W. Bird Jr.

== Death ==
Barnes died in 2004.
