= Virginia's 4th House of Delegates district =

Virginia legislative district

Virginia's 4th State House of Delegates district
- District map from the 2023 election
Delegate
Charniele Herring; D–Alexandria
- Demographics: 30% White; 25% Black; 28% Hispanic; 10% Asian; 0% Native American; 0% Hawaiian/Pacific Islander; 1% Other; 6% Multiracial
- Population (2024) • Voting age: 85,854; 18
- Registered voters: 48,928

Virginia's 4th House of Delegates district is one of 100 seats in the Virginia House of Delegates, the lower house of the state's bicameral legislature. District 4 covers portions of the city of Alexandria, and Fairfax County. The district is represented by Democratic Delegate Charniele Herring.

== District officeholders ==
Years	Delegate	Party	Electoral history
January 12, 1972 – January 12, 1983	Archie Campbell	Democratic	
January 12, 1983 – January 10, 1990	Don McGlothlin	Democratic	Lost reelection
January 10, 1990 – January 8, 1992	Jackie Stump	Democratic	Redistricted to 3rd
January 8, 1992 – January 8, 2014	Joe Johnson	Democratic	Retired
January 8, 2014 – September 18, 2014	Ben Chafin	Republican	Resigned; Elected to the Virginia State Senate
December 19, 2014 – January 8, 2020	Todd Pillion	Republican	First elected via special election in 2014, resigned January 8, 2020 following election to the Virginia Senate
January 8, 2020 – January 10, 2024	Will Wampler	Republican	First elected via special election in 2020. Redistricted to the 44th District and did not run for re-election.
January 10, 2024 – present	Charniele Herring	Democratic	Redistricted from 46th District

== Electoral history ==
2015 General Election, Virginia 4th House of Delegates
Party	Candidate	Votes	%	±%
Republican	Todd Pillion	13,797	100.00%	n/a
Total votes		13,797	100.00%	n/a

2016 General Election, Presidential
Party	Candidate	Votes	%	±%
Republican	Donald Trump	23,449	77.43%	n/a
Democratic	Hillary Clinton	5,962	19.69%	n/a
Libertarian	Gary Johnson	490	1.62%	n/a
Independent	Evan McMullin	252	0.83%	n/a
Green	Jill Stein	127	0.42%	n/a
Total votes		30,280	100.00%	n/a
