= Jackson Reasor =

American lawyer and politician

Member of the Virginia Senate from the 38th district
- In office January 8, 1992 – November 30, 1998
- Preceded by: Danny Bird
- Succeeded by: Phillip Puckett

Personal details
- Born: Jackson Edwin Reasor Jr. November 13, 1952 (age 73) Danville, Virginia, U.S.
- Party: Democratic
- Spouse: Cynthia
- Education: Lincoln Memorial University; University of Richmond

Jackson Edwin Reasor Jr. (born November 13, 1952) is an American lawyer and politician who served as a member of the Virginia state senate from 1992 until his resignation in 1998 to become CEO of the Old Dominion Electric Cooperative.
