= William C. Wampler Jr. =

American politician (born 1959)

Member of the Virginia Senate from the 40th district
- In office January 8, 1992 – January 11, 2012
- Preceded by: Jack Kennedy
- Succeeded by: Bill Carrico

Member of the Virginia Senate from the 39th district
- In office January 13, 1988 – January 8, 1992
- Preceded by: James P. Jones
- Succeeded by: Madison Marye

Personal details
- Born: William Creed Wampler Jr. September 9, 1959 (age 67) Bristol, Tennessee, U.S.
- Party: Republican
- Spouse: Mary Baker Thurmond
- Children: 2, including Will
- Parent: William C. Wampler (father)
- Education: University of Tennessee
- Occupation: Insurance

Military service
- Allegiance: United States
- Branch/service: United States Army
- Years of service: 1981–1984 (Active); 1984–2002 (Reserve)
- Rank: Colonel
- Unit: U.S. Army Reserve

William Creed Wampler Jr. (born September 9, 1959) is an American politician. A Republican, he was a member of the Senate of Virginia from 1988 to 2011. He represented the 40th district in the southwest corner of the state, which included Dickenson, Lee, Scott and Wise Counties and parts of Washington County, along with the cities of Bristol and Norton.

== Early and family life ==
Wampler was a child of former U.S. Representative William Creed Wampler Sr. and his first wife, Mary Elizabeth Wampler. He was educated in the local public schools, then at the University of Tennessee across the state line. Wampler received a B.A. degree in political science (as had his father from Virginia Tech years earlier) and joined the U.S. Army reserves, where he rose to the rank of Major in the 80th Branch (ARMOR).

== Career ==
Senator Wampler sells insurance and is active in his local Episcopal Church, as well as the Jaycees and the Appalachian Independence Center.

Wampler was elected to the Virginia Senate to represent his native Bristol and adjacent counties in 1987. The district was numbered the 39th Senatorial district. It was renumbered as the 40th before the 1991 election. He defeated Democrat J. Jack Kennedy Jr. in 1991 by winning 52% of the vote, and ran unopposed for re-election in 1995, 1999, 2003 and 2007 before announcing that he would not seek re-election in 2011. Before retiring from the Virginia Senate, Wampler often served on the Senate Finance Committee and on the Budget Conference Committee.

He has also served on the Executive Committee of the Tobacco Indemnification and Community Revitalization Commission. He was succeeded in the Senate by Republican Charles William Carrico.

Wampler's father, William C. Wampler Sr., was a member of the United States House of Representatives. His son, Will Wampler III, was elected to the Virginia House of Delegates in 2019.
