= Ben Chafin =

American politician (1960–2021)

Member of the Virginia Senate from the 38th district
- In office September 18, 2014 – January 1, 2021
- Preceded by: Phillip Puckett
- Succeeded by: Travis Hackworth

Member of the Virginia House of Delegates from the 4th district
- In office January 8, 2014 – September 18, 2014
- Preceded by: Joseph P. Johnson
- Succeeded by: Todd Pillion

Personal details
- Born: Augustus Benton Chafin Jr. May 18, 1960 Abingdon, Virginia, U.S.
- Died: January 1, 2021 (aged 60) Richmond, Virginia, U.S.
- Party: Republican
- Spouse: Lora Lee Carr
- Children: 3
- Relatives: Teresa M. Chafin (sister)
- Education: East Tennessee State University (BA); University of Richmond School of Law (JD)

Augustus Benton Chafin Jr. (May 18, 1960 – January 1, 2021) was an American politician who served in the Virginia House of Delegates from the 4th district in 2014, and in the Senate of Virginia from the 38th district from 2014 to 2021, as a member of the Republican Party.

== Early life and education ==
Augustus Benton Chafin Jr. was born on May 18, 1960, in Abingdon, Virginia, to Augustus Benton Chafin Sr. and Mary Miller. He was married to Lora Lee Car for thirty-eight years and had three children with her. Chafin graduated from East Tennessee State University with a Bachelor of Arts in 1982, and later graduated from the University of Richmond School of Law with a juris doctor. His sister, Teresa M. Chafin, was elected to the Supreme Court of Virginia.

In 1986, Chafin created a law firm, Chafin Law Firm, in Lebanon, Virginia. He served as counsel for the Russell County Industrial Development Authority for eighteen years and served on the First Bank and Trust's board of directors, which his father has aided in the creation of.

== Career ==
=== Virginia House of Delegates ===
During the 2013 Virginia House of Delegates election, Chafin sought a seat in the Virginia House of Delegates from the 4th district as a Republican. Incumbent Democratic Representative Joseph P. Johnson was retiring and Chafin faced no opposition in the general election.

=== Senate of Virginia ===
In 2013, Senator Phillip Puckett resigned from the Senate of Virginia causing a special election. Chafin defeated Democratic nominee Dean Michael Hymes and independent Rickey Allen Mullins in the special election becoming the first Republican elected to the 38th Senate district since George F. Barnes won during the 1971 election. Chafin and Hymes both raised over $700,000 for their campaigns. He was reelected in the 2015 and 2019 elections.

Chafin served on the Education and Health, Judiciary, Privileges and Elections, and Rehabilitation and Social Services committees in the state senate.

== Death ==
Chafin was hospitalized after contracting COVID-19 in December 2020, and died from complications of the virus at VCU Medical Center in Richmond, Virginia. A special election was called by Governor Ralph Northam to select a successor, which was won by Republican Travis Hackworth against Democratic nominee Laurie Buchwald.

== Electoral history ==
2013 Virginia House of Delegates 4th district election
Party	Candidate	Votes	%
Republican	Ben Chafin	13,959	97.91%
Write-in		298	2.09%
Total votes		14,257	100.00%

2014 Senate of Virginia 38th district special election
Party	Candidate	Votes	%
Republican	Ben Chafin	17,496	59.55%
Democratic	Dean Michael Hymes	9,354	31.84%
Independent	Rickey Allen Mullins	2,517	8.57%
Write-in		13	0.04%
Total votes		29,380	100.00%

2015 Senate of Virginia 38th district election
Party	Candidate	Votes	%
Republican	Ben Chafin (incumbent)	31,025	98.30%
Write-in		537	1.70%
Total votes		31,562	100.00%

2019 Senate of Virginia 38th district election
Party	Candidate	Votes	%
Republican	Ben Chafin (incumbent)	30,295	63.52%
Independent	George William McCall III	16,874	35.38%
Write-in		528	1.11%
Total votes		47,697	100.00%
