= Virginia's 40th Senate district =

American legislative district

Virginia's 40th State Senate district
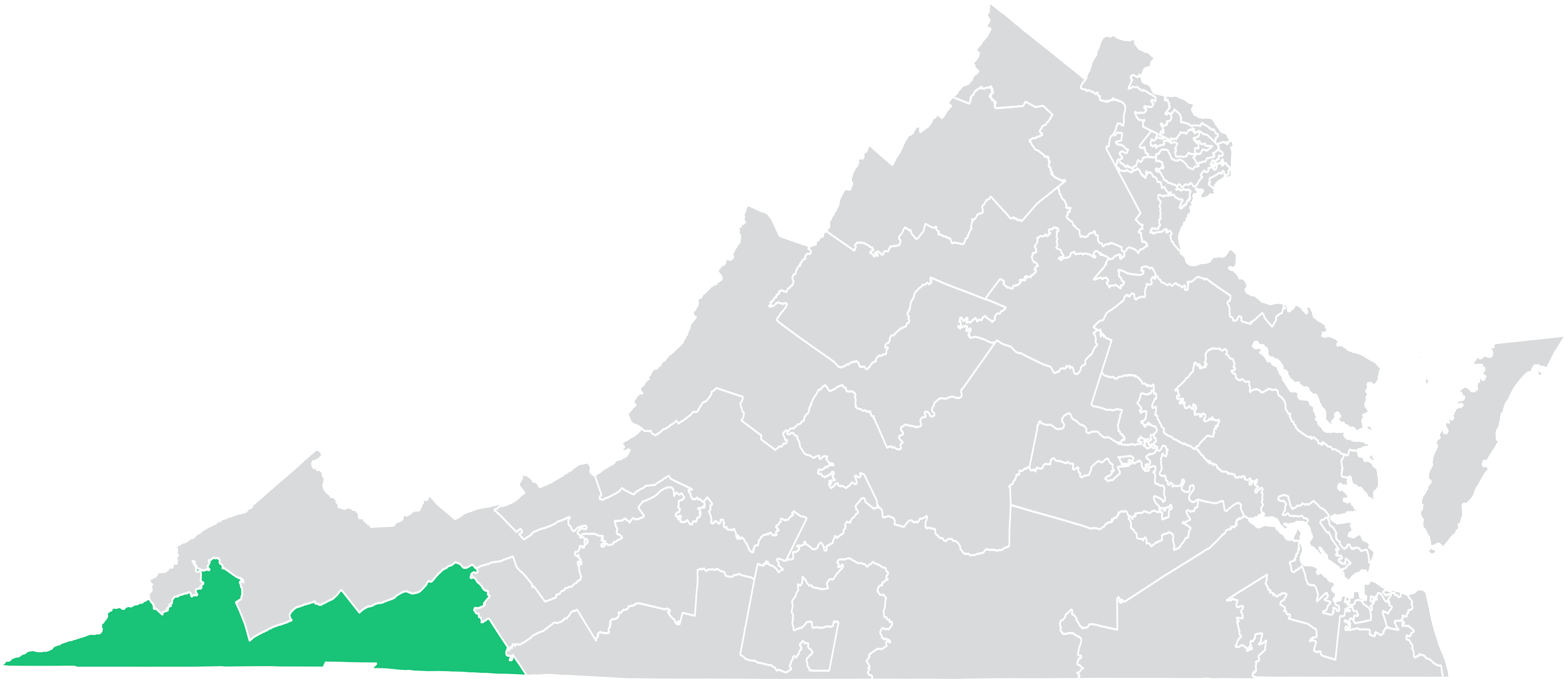
Senator
Barbara Favola; D–Arlington
- Demographics: 94% White; 3% Black; 2% Hispanic; 0% Asian; 1% Other
- Population (2019): 190,166
- Registered voters: 128,567

Virginia's 40th Senate district is one of 40 districts in the Senate of Virginia. It has been represented by Democrat Barbara Favola since 2024. Before the 2023 Virginia Senate election, it was represented by Todd Pillion, who succeeded retiring fellow Republican Charles William Carrico Sr..

== Geography ==
District 40 covers most of Arlington County, Virginia. It was previously located in the southwestern corner of Virginia before 2024.

The district is located entirely within Virginia's 8th congressional district. It borders the Potomac River.

== Recent election results ==
=== 2019 ===
2019 Virginia Senate election, District 40
Party	Candidate	Votes	%
Republican	Todd Pillion	40,122	76.3
Independent	Ken Heath	12,271	23.4
Total votes		52,552	100
Republican hold			

=== 2015 ===
2015 Virginia Senate election, District 40
Party	Candidate	Votes	%
Republican	Charles William Carrico Sr. (incumbent)	36,838	98.4
Total votes		37,433	100
Republican hold			

=== 2011 ===
2011 Virginia Senate election, District 40
Party	Candidate	Votes	%
Republican	Charles William Carrico Sr.	31,333	66.9
Democratic	John Lamie	15,480	33.0
Total votes		46,864	100
Republican hold			

=== Federal and statewide results ===
Year	Office	Results
2020	President	Trump 79.1–19.1%
2017	Governor	Gillespie 76.5–22.6%
2016	President	Trump 77.0–20.0%
2014	Senate	Gillespie 66.3–31.9%
2013	Governor	Cuccinelli 69.1–26.7%
2012	President	Romney 70.4–28.0%
2012	Senate	Allen 68.4–31.6%

== Historical results ==
All election results below took place prior to 2011 redistricting, and thus were under different district lines.

=== 2007 ===
2007 Virginia Senate election, District 40
Party	Candidate	Votes	%
Republican	William C. Wampler Jr. (incumbent)	33,524	99.4
Total votes		33,738	100
Republican hold			

=== 2003 ===
2003 Virginia Senate election, District 40
Party	Candidate	Votes	%
Republican	William C. Wampler Jr. (incumbent)	27,826	99.9
Total votes		27,850	100
Republican hold			

=== 1999 ===
1999 Virginia Senate election, District 40
Party	Candidate	Votes	%
Republican	William C. Wampler Jr. (incumbent)	28,326	99.9
Total votes		28,365	100
Republican hold			

=== 1995 ===
1995 Virginia Senate election, District 40
Party	Candidate	Votes	%
Republican	William C. Wampler Jr. (incumbent)	28,733	99.9
Total votes		28,764	100
Republican hold			

== List of members ==
Senator	Party	Tenure	Electoral history
John Chalkley Buchanan	Democratic	January 1972 – April 15, 1991	First elected in 1971; Died on April 15, 1991
J. Jack Kennedy Jr.	Democratic	June 1991 – January 8, 1992	First elected in 1991 special election Lost reelection in November election following redistricting
William C. Wampler Jr.	Republican	January 8, 1992 – January 11, 2012	First elected in 1991, re-elected in 1995, 1999, 2003, and 2007; Retired
Charles W. Carrico Sr.	Republican	January 11, 2012 – January 8, 2020	First elected in 2011, re-elected unopposed in 2015
Todd Pillion	Republican	January 8, 2020 – present	First elected in 2019
