= Dan Bowling =

American politician

Member of the Virginia House of Delegates from the 3rd district
- In office January 11, 2006 – January 13, 2010
- Preceded by: Jackie Stump
- Succeeded by: Will Morefield

Personal details
- Born: Dan Carr Bowling, II; November 16, 1946 (age 79) Bluefield, West Virginia, U.S.
- Party: Democratic
- Spouse: Janice D. White
- Children: Daniel, Tammy, Danita, Chris, Louetta
- Education: Southwest Virginia Community College; Bluefield State College; Virginia Tech
- Profession: College professor

Dan Carr Bowling, II (November 16, 1946 – July 19, 2023) was an American politician of the Democratic Party. He is a former member of the Virginia House of Delegates. He represented the 3rd district in the southwest part of the state, including Buchanan County and parts of Russell and Tazewell Counties. He was defeated by Will Morefield in his bid for reelection on November 3, 2009.
