= Jackie Stump =

American coal miner, union leader, and politician

Member of the Virginia House of Delegates
- In office January 10, 1990 – December 16, 2005
- Preceded by: Don McGlothlin
- Succeeded by: Dan Bowling
- Constituency: 4th district (1990–1992); 3rd district (1992–2005)

Personal details
- Born: Jackie Thomas Stump; January 13, 1948 Lebanon, Virginia, U.S.
- Died: June 2, 2016 (aged 68) Abingdon, Virginia, U.S.
- Party: Democratic
- Other political affiliations: Independent (1989–1990)
- Spouse: Linda Harrison

Military service
- Branch/service: United States Air Force
- Years of service: 1967–1971
- Battles/wars: Vietnam War

Jackie Thomas Stump (January 13, 1948 – June 2, 2016) was an American coal miner, union leader, and politician who served in the Virginia House of Delegates. He resigned after being diagnosed with colon cancer in 2005, shortly after winning a ninth term. He was first elected as a write-in candidate, supported by United Mine Workers during the Pittston Coal strike.
