= 1913 Virginia gubernatorial election =

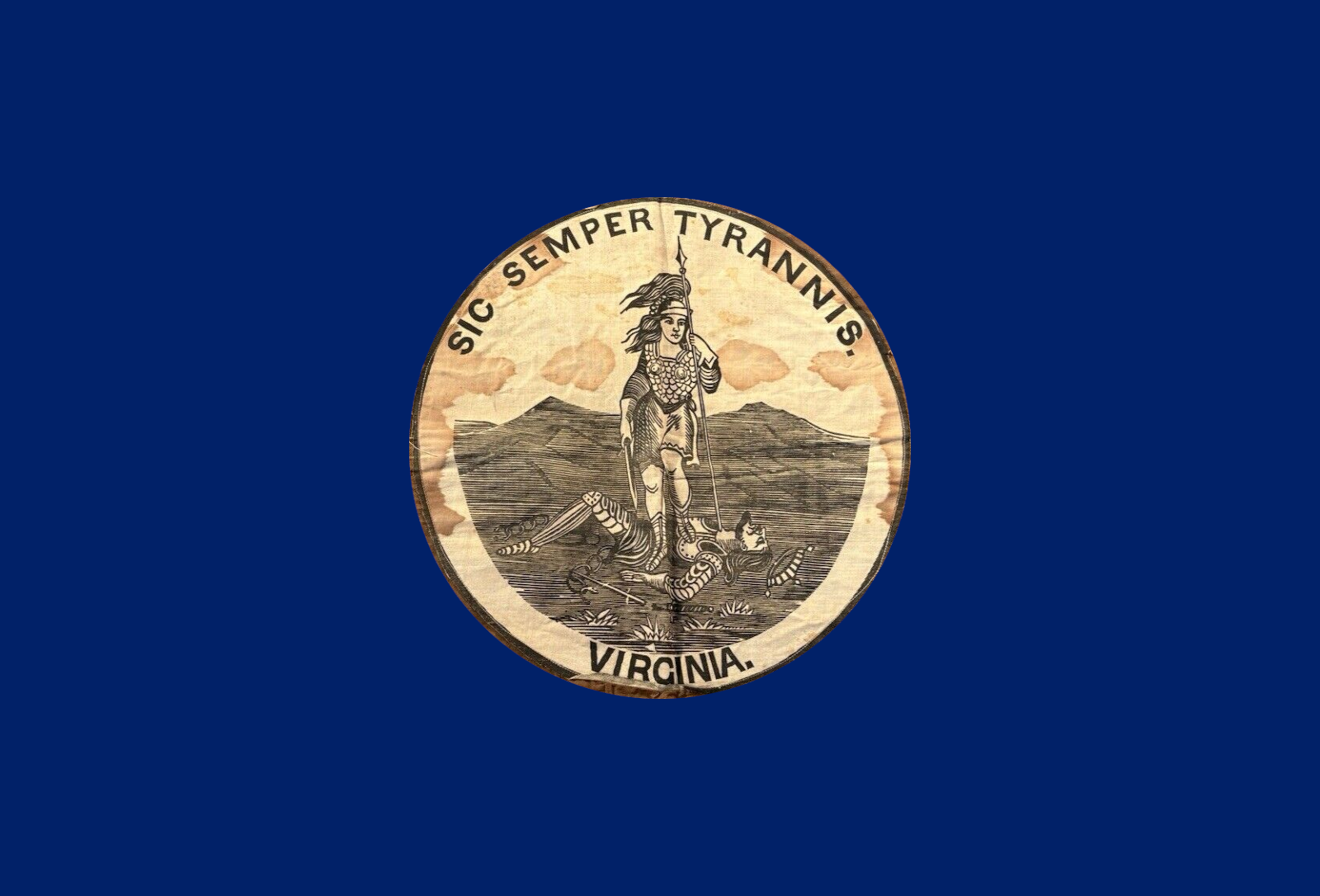
- November 4, 1913
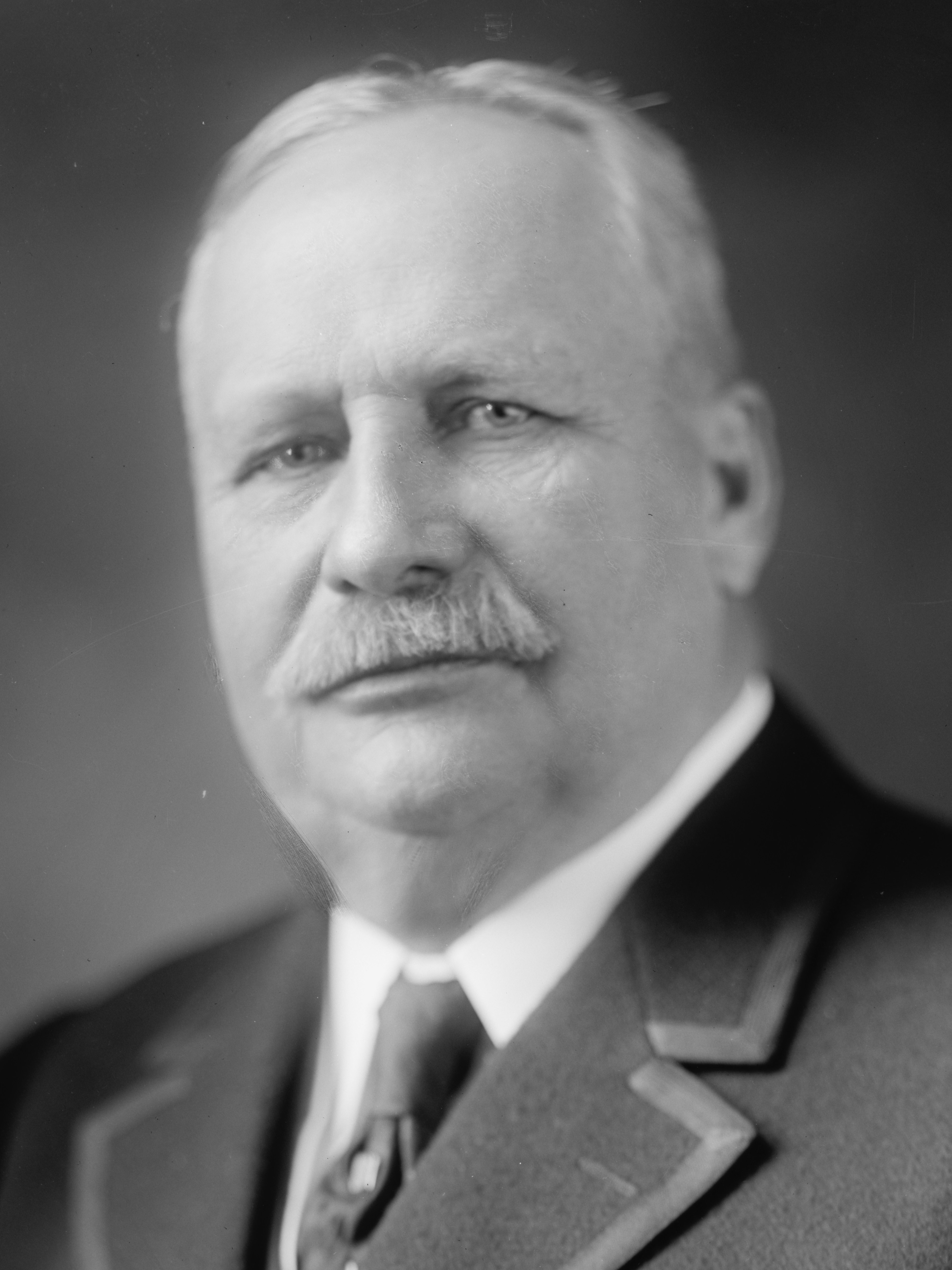

Nominee	Henry Carter Stuart	C. Campbell
Party	Democratic	Socialist
Popular vote	66,518	3,789
Percentage	91.87%	5.23%
- County results Stuart: 60–70% 80–90% 90–100%
Governor before election
William Hodges Mann
Democratic
Elected Governor
Henry Carter Stuart
Democratic

The 1913 Virginia gubernatorial election was held on November 4, 1913, to elect the governor of Virginia. Henry Carter Stuart won in a landslide, as the Republicans failed to nominate a candidate for governor.

== Results ==
Virginia gubernatorial election, 1913
Party	Candidate	Votes	%
Democratic	Henry Carter Stuart	66,518	91.87%
Socialist	C. Campbell	3,789	5.23%
Socialist Labor	B. D. Downey	2,100	2.90%
Total votes		72,407	100.00%
Democratic hold			
