= Todd Pillion =

American politician (born 1973)

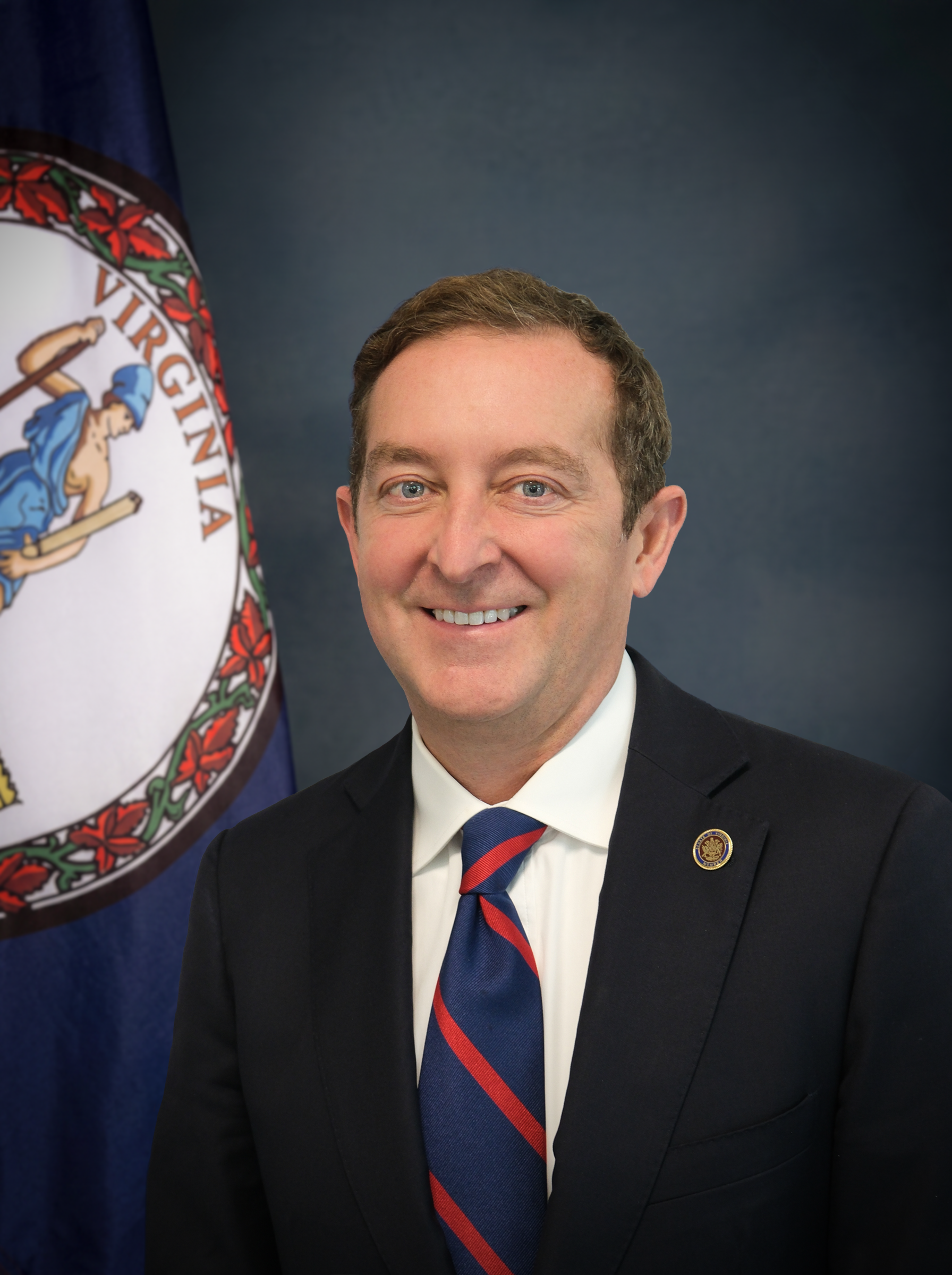

Member of the Virginia Senate
- Incumbent
- Assumed office January 8, 2020
- Preceded by: Charles Carrico Sr.
- Constituency: 40th District (2020–2024); 6th District (since 2024)

Member of the Virginia House of Delegates from the 4th district
- In office December 19, 2014 – January 8, 2020
- Preceded by: Ben Chafin
- Succeeded by: Will Wampler

Personal details
- Born: Todd Edward Pillion; November 1, 1973 (age 52) Middlesboro, Kentucky, U.S.
- Party: Republican
- Spouse: Amanda Scott Lawson
- Education: Lincoln Memorial University (BA); VCU School of Dentistry (DDS)
- Committees: Finance and Appropriations, General Laws and Technology, Education and Health, Rules
- Website: toddpillion.com

Military service
- Allegiance: United States
- Branch/service: United States Army
- Years of service: 2001–2009
- Rank: Major
- Unit: Virginia Army National Guard
- Battles/wars: Iraq War

Todd Edward Pillion (born November 1, 1973) is an American dentist, business owner, and politician from the Commonwealth of Virginia. A member of the Republican Party, Pillion represents the 6th district in the Virginia Senate in Southwest Virginia. He previously represented the 4th district in the Virginia House of Delegates.

Pillion is from Abingdon, Virginia.

== Education and military career ==
Pillion graduated from Thomas Walker High School in Ewing, Virginia, and then from Lincoln Memorial University in Harrogate, Tennessee. Finally, Pillion graduated from the Virginia Commonwealth University School of Dentistry. He joined the Virginia Army National Guard, with the commission of captain. He served with the 42nd Infantry Division in Operation Iraqi Freedom, operating in Tikrit. He was promoted to major by 2009, when he left the Virginia Army National Guard after eight years of service.

== Political career ==
In December 2014, Pillion won a special election to the House of Delegates to fill the seat of Ben Chafin, a Republican who was elected to the Virginia State Senate.

In 2019, Pillion was elected to the open 40th district of the Virginia Senate, defeating independent Ken Heath.

Virginia House of Delegates
Preceded by Ben Chafin	Member of the Virginia House of Delegates from the 4th district 2004–2020	Succeeded by Will Wampler
Senate of Virginia
Preceded by Charles Carrico Sr.	Member of the Virginia Senate from the 40th district 2020–2024	Succeeded by Barbara Favola
Preceded by Lynwood Lewis	Member of the Virginia Senate from the 6th district 2024–Present	Incumbent
