= Will Wampler =

American politician (born 1991)

Member of the Virginia House of Delegates from the 4th district
- In office January 8, 2020 – January 10, 2024
- Preceded by: Todd Pillion
- Succeeded by: Charniele Herring (redistricting)

Personal details
- Born: William Creed Wampler III; March 11, 1991 (age 35) Bristol, Virginia, U.S.
- Party: Republican
- Parent: William C. Wampler Jr. (father)
- Education: University of South Carolina; Liberty University

William Creed Wampler III (born March 11, 1991) is an American attorney and politician from Abingdon, Virginia.

After defeating Russell County supervisor David Eaton in the Republican primary, Wampler defeated Starla Kiser in the 2019 general election to succeed Todd Pillion in the Virginia House of Delegates. He is the grandson of Congressman William Wampler and son of state senator William Wampler Jr.

== Electoral history ==
Date	Election	Candidate	Party	Votes	%
Virginia House of Delegates, Dickenson, Russell, Washington, and Wise district
Virginia House of Delegates, 4th district
June 11, 2019	Republican Primary	William C. Wampler III	Republican	2,319	64.5
June 11, 2019	Republican Primary	David "Peanut" R. Eaton	Republican	1,278	35.5
June 11, 2019	Republican Primary	Todd Pillion retired to run for Senate; seat remained Republican			
Nov 5, 2019	General	William C. Wampler III	Republican	14,384	62.91
Nov 5, 2019	General	Starla J. Kiser	Democratic	8,460	37.00
Nov 5, 2019	General	Write Ins		21	0.09
