= Dale Carter (politician) =

American lawyer and politician (1802-1878)

Member of the Virginia Senate from Buchanan, Russell, and Tazewell Counties
- In office December 4, 1865 – April 29, 1867
- Preceded by: Robert M. Bales
- Succeeded by: James M. French

Member of the Virginia House of Delegates from Russell County
- In office December 7, 1857 – December 5, 1859
- Preceded by: Joseph Kelly
- Succeeded by: position eliminated

Personal details
- Born: October 14, 1802 Russell County, Virginia
- Died: December 30, 1878 (aged 76) Russell County, Virginia
- Spouse: Elizabeth Campbell Smith
- Relations: Henry Carter Stuart (grandson), Dale Carter Stuart (great grandson)
- Children: 4 sons, 4 daughters
- Parent(s): John Thomas Carter, Sarah Frazier
- Occupation: lawyer, real estate speculator, politician

Dale Carter (October 14, 1802 – December 20, 1878) was a Virginia lawyer, farmer, real estate speculator and politician from Russell County who served in both houses of the Virginia General Assembly. The wealthiest of the Southwest Virginia Carter family was nicknamed "Squire" late in life for his post-war real estate acquisitions in Virginia, Tennessee and Kentucky which encompassed more land than the state of Delaware and which led to the creation of Dickenson County, Virginia. Carter served in the Virginia Constitutional Convention of 1850, then a single term in each house of the Virginia General Assembly: in the Virginia House of Delegates (1857-1858) and representing the Buchanan, Russell and Tazewell District in the Senate (1865-1867).

== Early life ==
The son of the former Sarah Frazier and her husband, John Thomas Carter (1774-1836) was born on a farm in the part of then-large Russell County that later became Scott County, Virginia.

His name reflects a relative, Dale Carter, who had married Mary Bickley (1746-1827 or 1836) and died on October 6, 1774 as Native Americans attacked Fort Blackmore on the Clinch River at the confluence of Rocky Branch. That elder Dale Carter had helped his brother John survey around Rye Cove and Cove Creek, as well as build what would become the oldest settlement in southwest Virginia alongside Captain John Blackmore, his son John Blackmore Jr. and brother Joseph Blackmore, as well as Andrew Davis and a comrade of Daniel Boone (and former captive) named David Cox (who later married John Blackmore's daughter). Six months earlier, Dale (or Deal) Carter had claimed 96 acres of land on the north bank of the Clinch River adjoining that of John Carter, and Thomas Carter had claimed 197 acres on the north side of the Clinch River beginning at the mouth of Cove Creek, then in July 1774 John Carter claimed 2000 acres on the branches of Elkhorn Creek in Kentucky on behalf of a deceased Thomas Carter. [When settlement began it was part of huge Augusta County, then very large Botetourt County, then still large Fincastle County before Virginia's legislature created Washington County in 1776.] When Russell County was created from once-large Washington County in 1786, a relative, Thomas Carter would represent it in the Virginia House of Delegates and the Virginia Ratification Convention of 1788, as well as served as county lieutenant (the chief executive officer, with militia oversight), while merchant Henry Dickenson also served as the new county's clerk. [Tazewell County would be split from Russell County in 1799, then during this man's lifetime, Russell County would be further split to create Scott County in 1816, and Wise County in 1855.] Thus, "Dale" became an honored name in the southwest Virginia Carter family, and during this man's lifetime, another man, known as Dale W. Carter (1804-1851), lived and farmed in the western part of Scott County (so both would often be confused by genealogists).

This Dale Carter came from a large family, as had his father John Thomas Carter (one of several sons of Norris Carter). He was the second of seven brothers who reached adulthood, and received a private education appropriate to his class, including probably reading law with a local judge or attorney, as shown by his later career. An adult by the time of his mother's death and his father's remarriage, he was presumably less affected than his younger siblings, that marriage produced no further children, so they had no half-siblings. Three younger brothers remained in Scott County: George C. Carter (1807-1888), Henry S. Carter (1808-1880) and James Preston Carter (1815-1896). Their eldest brother, Davidson Carter (1798-1862), moved his family as well as sister Mary Carter, and younger brothers Charles Randolph Carter (1806-1853) and Elihu Embrie Carter (1816-1870) to (non-slaveholding) Indiana long before the Civil War. None of the brothers, nor their sons (including at least one named Dale Carter) died in that conflict.

== Career ==
Admitted to the Virginia bar in Russell County on September 4, 1827, Carter developed a practice in southwest Virginia. He farmed (after marrying his wife, who inherited land near Lebanon, the Russell County seat) as well as speculated in land in several nearby areas. Before the Civil War began, Carter purchased (or obtained through land grants) 65,000 acres in Virginia, Kentucky and Tennessee. He owned 9,750 acres in Russell County alone, but sold or otherwise disposed of about a third of them. His real estate holdings were valued at $25,000 in 1850 and $81,000 in 1860. Carter also owned slaves: four in 1830, 10 in 1840, 17 in 1850 and 26 in 1850.

Carter's first statewide elective office was as one of three men jointly sent by voters in Scott, Russell and Lee Counties to the Virginia Constitutional Convention of 1850-1851. He had polled third in the eight candidate field and served alongside fellow attorney Samuel V. Fulkerson and Hiram Kilgore. He was present but spoke little publicly, serving on the preliminary Committee of Elections and later on the standing Committee on the Right of Suffrage and Qualifications of Persons to be Elected.

Carter was the only delegate representing Russell County in the 1857 legislative session, although G. W. Candler and Joseph Kelly represented it in the previous term. Although he served on the prestigious Committee of Finance, voters refused to re-elect him when in the 1858 legislative session, Russell was combined with nearby Wise and Buchanan Counties. Voters in the new district instead elected William J. Dickenson and Charles H. Gilmer as their delegates.

During the American Civil War, Carter sympathized with the Confederacy, but age and caution (and possibly knowing half of his birth family had moved to Indiana years before) led him to basically sit out the conflict. Russell County had no fixed battles; most fighting in southwest Virginia area was between bushwhackers. While a group of Home Guards aligned with the Union, Russell County served more as a breadbasket for the Confederacy as well as supplied 1450 fighting men (including Capt. Simeon Hunt and the New Garden Fearnots which became part of Virginia's 37th Infantry, and the State Line cavalry company later part of the 21st Virginia Cavalry). Although a Confederate company was organized in Wise County, and several militia companies saw service in the borders of Virginia, Kentucky, Tennessee and what became West Virginia in the conflict, the only skirmish between rival Home Guard companies occurred on the Cranesnest River. Carter supplied supplies and enslaved labor to the Confederacy when requisitioned. Also in September 1863, he traveled to Richmond as requested by the county court to explain why drought and nearby opposing armies prevented Russell County from fulfilling the requisition for male slaves to work on fortifications near the state capital.

Following the conflict, Carter received a presidential pardon on October 26, 1865. He was also elected to the Virginia Senate, from a district which had changed from that during the conflict, but now included Buchanan, Russell and Tazewell Counties. He sat on the Committees on Finance and on Public Institutions, and in the second session was also on the Committee on Federal Relations. During the special session in March and April 1867, after two Senate colleagues declined their appointments to travel to Washington D.C., Carter was among the eight member Virginia delegation which met with President Andrew Johnson. The group affirmed that the Commonwealth had abolished involuntary servitude, and presented five resolutions supporting Reconstruction. Once again, however, Carter did not win re-election, and possibly did not run, preferring a quiet life on his farms or to increase his landholdings, or both. Confederate veteran George Cowen represented Russell and Buchanan Counties in the Virginia Constitutional Convention of 1868, and after voters accepted that Constitution with minor revisions, his former state senatorial district was split. James M. French was elected to represent Russell County together with Pulaski, Bland and Tazewell Counties, and George H. Kendrick was elected to represent Lee, Scott, Wise and Buchanan Counties in the Virginia Senate.

In 1870, Carter was chairman of the Saltworks and Coal Mine Railroad Company.

In October 1876, not long before his death, Carter filed a lawsuit in Grundy, the county seat of Buchanan County, attempting to evict 26 families (including that of his prewar legislative predecessor, Joseph Kelly) from their lands in the area known as Sandy Basin. Kelly convened an open meeting on July 4, 1879 at the mouth of Open Fork (now Nora, Virginia) and proposed creating a new county, since they had difficulties traveling from their mountain homes to the county seats of Grundy for Buchanan County, Lebanon for Russell County or Gladeville for Wise County. In the election that November, Jasper S. Colly was elected from Buchanan and Wise Counties, and William J. Dickenson from Russell County, and both aligned with the R-Adjuster party. Dickenson presented the bill for the new county in the House of Delegates, and although Senator John R. Thurman of Bedford County to the north proposed to name it "Stonewall" to honor the Confederate general, Senator Leese of Russell County and Senator Riddleberger of Shenandoah County opposed that name. After further amendments were rejected, it passed both houses of the legislature and was signed into law on March 3, 1880. Then commissioners (including Kelly) laid off magisterial districts centered at Ervinton, Holly Creek and Sand Lick. The first session of the new county's court was held on July 22, 1880, and the first session of the Circuit Court on May 30, 1881.

== Personal life ==
On December 15, 1829, Carter married Elizabeth Campbell Smith (1813-1897). Her maternal great grandfather, Henry Smith II, had received several parcels of land in what became Russell County because of his revolutionary war service and built a plantation known as Clifton, a rebuilt version of which is now on the National Register for Historic Places. Her father Henry (Harry) Smith III lived at Clifton, which Eliza inherited and where she lived the rest of her life. She bore eight children who reached adulthood. Although the firstborn son, Henry Smith Carter (1833-1851) died while a student at Emory and Henry College, their eldest daughter, Mary Taylor Carter (1831-1862) married William A. Stuart, son of Congressman Archibald Stuart and brother of CSA Gen. J.E.B. Stuart, and their eldest son (this man's grandson), Henry Carter Stuart became Governor of Virginia and his youngest brother John James Stuart (1860-1939) continued the family's legal tradition by becoming a judge in Washington County, Virginia. This man's eldest surviving son, John Taylor Carter (Jan 18, 1837-1908), served as private in the cavalry of the Confederate States Army and a single term as a legislator (1877-1878). His brother Charles Dale Carter (1844-1896) may have served as a captain in the conflict, then moved to Smyth County after marrying a minister's daughter there, and became a wealthy rancher. The youngest brother "Arch" Stuart Carter (1855-1924), definitely too young to serve in the conflict, moved to California after 1900. He married twice but only had one daughter before dying in the San Francisco Bay area. The second daughter, Margaret Crockett Carter (1839-1874) married John T. Lampkin as the conflict ended, and their son and daughter ultimately inherited Carter Hill. Her sister Sallie Preston Carter (1843-1910) married a Dutch civil engineer, A.O. Pennis, and moved to Baltimore, Maryland, where she later spent time at Bayview asylum before dying at Johns Hopkins Hospital. The youngest daughter, Elizabeth Campbell Carter (1847-1922) married William White and moved to Washington County.

== Death and legacy ==
Carter died in 1878 and was buried on his farm near Lebanon. The Richmond Times Dispatch and Marion Patriot and Herald noted his passing. His widow survived him by nearly two decades, and bequeathed Carter Hill to her grandson Dale Carter Lampkin and his sister Sallie. Sallie had married W. W. Bird, a local attorney, who did not have children and inherited her share and lived with his brother in law until his death. It was then acquired by the longtime Russell County clerk and remained in that family. A scholar working for the Works Progress Administration noted its history in a 1937 typescript. It was listed on the Virginia Landmark Register in 1999 and on the National Register of Historic Places in 2000.
