= Charles William Carrico Sr. =

American politician (born 1961)

Bill Carrico
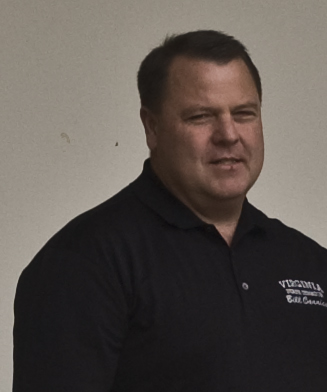

Member of the Virginia Senate from the 40th district
- In office January 11, 2012 – January 8, 2020
- Preceded by: William C. Wampler Jr.
- Succeeded by: Todd Pillion

Member of the Virginia House of Delegates from the 5th district
- In office January 9, 2002 – January 11, 2012
- Preceded by: John H. Tate Jr.
- Succeeded by: Israel O'Quinn

Personal details
- Born: Charles William Carrico; November 6, 1961 (age 64) Marion, Virginia, U.S.
- Party: Republican
- Spouse: Paula Denise Sweet
- Children: 2
- Education: Virginia Highlands Community College

Charles William Carrico Sr. (born November 6, 1961) is an American politician who served as a member of the Senate of Virginia from 2012 to 2020, representing the 40th district. He was previously a member of the Virginia House of Delegates from 2002 to 2012.

== Career ==
From 2002 to 2011, he was a member of the Virginia House of Delegates, representing the 5th district in the southwestern part of the state. Prior to that, he was a Virginia State Trooper.

Carrico's campaign for Senate was heavily financed by coal mining interests such as Alpha Natural Resources, Consol Energy and Richard Baxter Gilliam.

== Tenure and issues ==
In 2005, Carrico introduced an amendment to the religious freedom clause of the Virginia state constitution, based on the Virginia Statute of Religious Freedom written by Thomas Jefferson. The amendment posited a positive right to permit prayer on "public property, including public schools". The proposed amendment passed the House but died in the Virginia State Senate.

Carrico was the Republican nominee for Virginia's 9th congressional district in the 2006 midterm elections, but was defeated by Democratic incumbent Rick Boucher.

In January 2013, Carrico introduced a measure to reapportion Virginia's presidential electoral votes away from a winner-takes-all system to a proportional system similar to those in Maine and Nebraska.

On the issue of marijuana, Carrico said in 2014, "I think it’s a gateway drug. It enhances and gives reason for people to do things that are a lot stronger than marijuana. I believe ... that it can become abused and it’s like other drugs we have problems with like oxycodone ... that once it’s out there, it can be a harmful drug and get in the hands of others and start the trend of abuse."

In 2015, Carrico introduced SB 40, which would provide "that a clerk or deputy clerk shall not be required to issue a marriage license if such clerk has an objection to the issuance of such license on personal, ethical, moral, or religious grounds." Along with this he introduced SB 41, which would provide "that no individual authorized to solemnize any marriage shall be required to do so and no religious organization shall be required to provide services, accommodations, facilities, goods, or privileges for a purpose related to the solemnization of any marriage if the action would cause the individual or organization to violate a sincerely held religious belief."

== Personal life ==
He lives in unincorporated Grayson County, Virginia with his wife Paula.
