= D. Woodrow Bird =

American politician (1912–1995)

Member of the Virginia Senate
- In office January 11, 1956 – January 12, 1972
- Preceded by: Walter C. Caudill
- Constituency: 19th district (1956‍–‍1964); 18th district (1964‍–‍1966); 17th district (1966‍–‍1972)

Member of the Virginia House of Delegates from the Bland and Giles district
- In office January 14, 1948 – January 11, 1956
- Preceded by: E. Dewey Coburn
- Succeeded by: Maury C. Newton Sr.

Personal details
- Born: Daniel Woodrow Bird; July 6, 1912 Bland, Virginia, U.S.
- Died: November 16, 1995 (aged 83) Bland, Virginia, U.S.
- Party: Democratic
- Spouse: Elizabeth Kegley Dunn (m. 1936)
- Children: 4, including Daniel Jr.

Daniel Woodrow Bird Sr. (July 6, 1912 – November 16, 1995) was an American politician who served in both houses of the Virginia General Assembly. He is best remembered for his pioneering work in establishing community colleges in Virginia which became a model for the rest of the United States.

== Career ==
Bird was a member of the Democratic Party and was first elected to the Virginia House of Delegates in 1947. He remained in that position until January 1956 when he became a state senator. He worked as a senator for the next 15 years; ending his career in 1971 when he chose not to seek reelection. He served as chairman of the Higher Education Study Commission from 1964 through 1966. In that position he played an instrumental role in establishing Virginia's statewide system of community colleges; a success that became a national model.

In the 1950s Bird served as chairman of the Virginia Senate Education Committee during the era of desegregation in the United States. The Washington Post stated, that he "once cast the swing vote to keep the state's public schools open and allow integration to move forward, rather than risk the complete shutdown of the system." He was chairman of the commission for economy of government affairs (later the JLAC commission). At the time of his retirement in 1971, he was chairman of the Senate's agriculture committee.

Bird was directory of Dairymen Inc. and served as chairman of the executive committee of the Great Lakes to Florida Highway Association. He was regional director of the First Virginia Bank Board.

== Personal life ==
Bird married the former Elizabeth Kegley Dunn in 1936. They had two daughters and two sons, Janet, Judith, Daniel W. Jr. and George Thomas II. He was a Mason and a member of Bland United Methodist Church.

Bird died on November 16, 1995, at his home in Bland.

== Awards ==
In 1971, Bird was awarded the Distinguished Service to Agriculture Award by the Virginia Farm Bureau Federation. In 1994, he received the Bland County Outstanding Citizenship Award.
