= Travis Hackworth =

American politician from Virginia (born 1975)

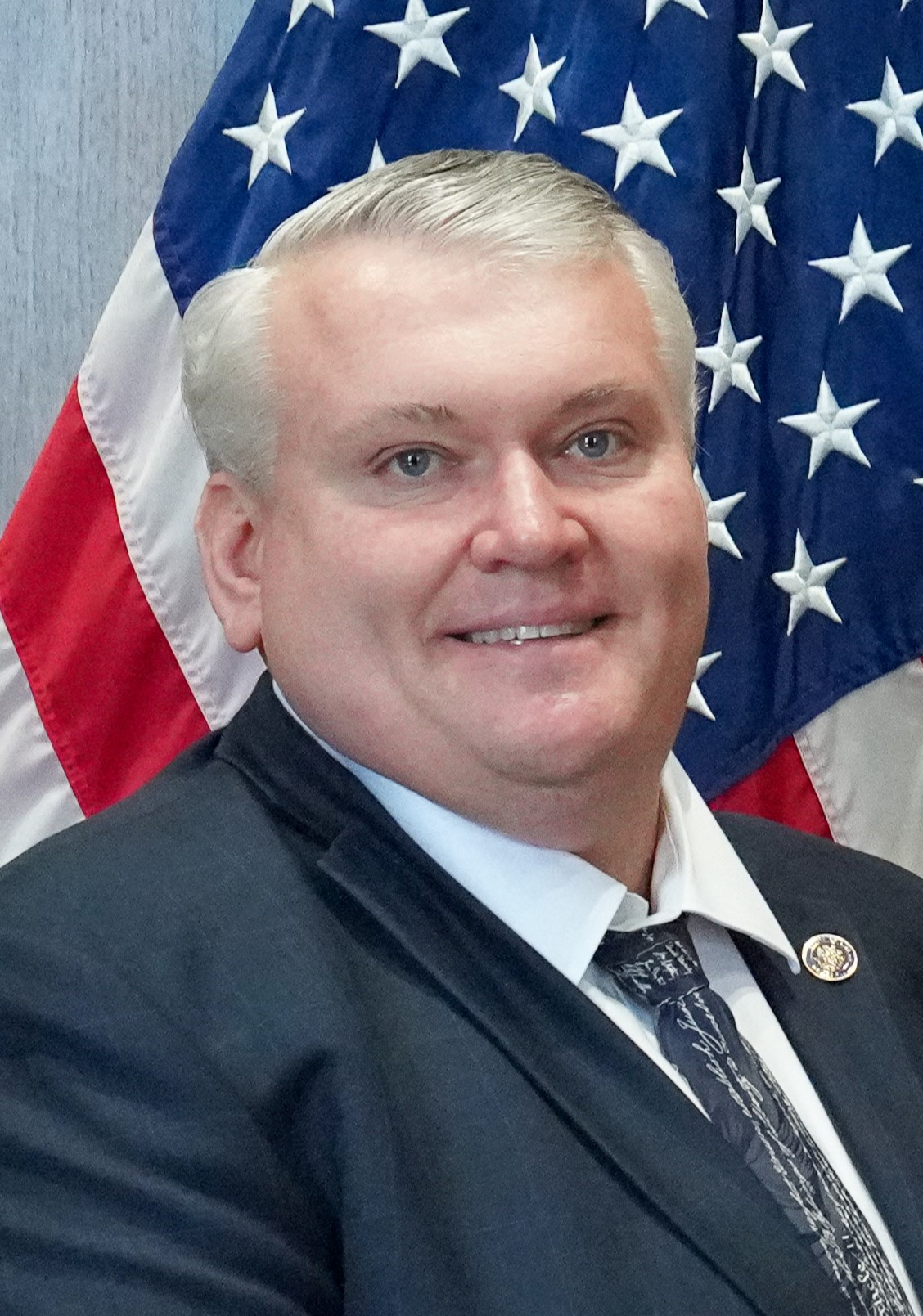

Member of the Virginia Senate
- Incumbent
- Assumed office April 2, 2021
- Preceded by: Ben Chafin
- Constituency: 38th District (2021–2024); 5th District (since 2024)

Personal details
- Born: Thurmon Travis Hackworth; June 5, 1975 (age 51) Tazewell, Virginia, U.S.
- Party: Republican
- Spouse: Angela Rebecca Boyd
- Education: Southwest Virginia Community College
- Occupation: Construction Business Executive

Thurmon Travis Hackworth (born June 5, 1975) is an American businessman and politician, serving as a member of the Virginia Senate from the 5th district. A member of the Republican Party, he took office on April 2, 2021.

Hackworth is a businessman from Richlands, Virginia, and serves on the Tazewell County Board of Supervisors. The members elected him chair of the board in January 2019.

Hackworth attended Richlands Christian Academy in Tazewell County and Southwest Virginia Community College. Identifying himself as an entrepreneur, he holds Class A Contractor licenses in Virginia, West Virginia, and Tennessee. He began a real estate and construction business in 1998, and now reports having commercial and residential real estate holdings in three states, as well as business interests in compounding and infusion pharmacy, custom wood and cabinetry manufacturing, interior flooring and design, auto sales, and investment groups.

Hackworth won the special election to represent Virginia's 38th Senate district in the Virginia Senate, following the death of Ben Chafin, with 76% of the vote on March 23, 2021.

Hackworth petitioned the Supreme Court of Virginia to prevent the state's redistricting commission from using a new state law to draw the legislative maps. The law changed how prisoners are counted in the population, as they were previously counted at their incarcerated address, but are now counted by their last known address. The state Supreme Court dismissed the petition in an order issued September 22, 2021.

In December 2021, Hackworth introduced a bill to the State Senate that would rescind requirements that schools follow Virginia Department of Education guidelines on equal treatment of transgender students. The bill, which faced strong opposition from trans rights advocates, was voted down in committee.

Senate of Virginia
Preceded by Ben Chafin	Member of the Virginia Senate from the 38th district 2021–2024	Succeeded by Jennifer Boysko
Preceded by Lionell Spruill	Member of the Virginia Senate from the 5th district 2024–Present	Incumbent
