= J. Jack Kennedy Jr. =

American politician

Jack Kennedy
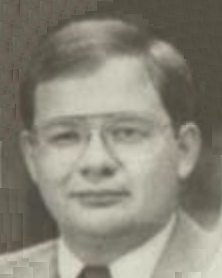

Member of the Virginia Senate from the 40th district
- In office June 1991 – January 8, 1992
- Preceded by: John Buchanan
- Succeeded by: William C. Wampler Jr.

Member of the Virginia House of Delegates from the 2nd district
- In office January 13, 1988 – June 1991
- Preceded by: Jim Robinson
- Succeeded by: Bud Phillips

Personal details
- Born: Joe Jack Kennedy Jr. June 11, 1956 (age 70) Virginia, U.S.
- Party: Democratic
- Education: University of Virginia; University of London; East Tennessee State University; University of North Dakota

Joe Jack Kennedy Jr. (born June 11, 1956) is an American politician who served in the Virginia Senate and House of Delegates. He was first elected to the House in 1987 after defeating incumbent James W. Robinson by a 2-to-1 majority after endorsements by the UMWA mine workers union, the NRA and the VEA teachers over James W. Robinson; and, he won re-election to the House of Delegates in 1989 against Republican Bonnie Elosser.

Kennedy ran successfully for Senate in a June 4, 1991 special election following the death of John Buchanan; he lost reelection the following November after redistricting placed him in the same district as William C. Wampler Jr. Among his accomplishments in the state legislature was the establishment of the Scenic Guest River Gorge recreational trail, the required covering of loaded coal trucks, creation of the Virginia Coalfield Economic Development Authority; advancing the Coeburn and Norton Bypasses to complete the four-lane of the US 58-A and US 23 highways, and the first attempt to change the name of Clinch Valley College to the University of Virginia's College at Wise, later accomplished in 1999.

== Public Service & Career ==
As a political activist from his teenage years, Kennedy served as a Virginia General Assembly Legislative Assistant to state legislators in 1976, 1977 and 1978; President of the Young Democrats of Virginia in 1984-1985; Young Democrats of America national secretary in 1985; the Ninth Congressional District Democratic Party Chair from 1985 to 1989. At the behest of Mark Warner, he served as Virginia Democratic Party Vice- Chair of Operations in 2000. He also served as a Democratic National Convention delegate in 1976, 1984, 1988, 1992, and 2000. He served as chair of the Wise County Democratic Committee in 2002 and 2003 leading to a sweep of the local county governing board at that time, thereupon largely ending his party activist days.

=== International Diplomacy ===
In 1984, Kennedy was a part of a small 6-member group that visited Grenada amid the invasion that took out Cuban and Russian occupiers following a coup; thereupon he attended the trial of some of the coup plotters, and met with political party leaders and government officials through several Caribbean islands. Six years later in 1990, he was selected to be a delegate to the North Atlantic Treaty Organization held in Paris in the wake of the collapse of the Berlin Wall. He has been active in international affairs through astronomy, astronautics and agricultural groups traveling throughout Europe, including Russia first shortly after the collapse of the Soviet Union, and again in 2010 to be briefed on their space facilities at Star City and Korolyov; the Middle East; north and central Africa; and China in Asia, being briefed by academic and diplomatic professionals before and during many of his foreign visits. He has traversed approximately 60 countries around the globe.

=== Wise County and City of Norton Circuit Court Clerk ===
Kennedy has served since December 1995 as Clerk of Court of Wise County, Virginia and City of Norton, Virginia, first winning in a special election filling the unexpired term of the late C. Gary Rakes. Subsequently, Kennedy was reelected in 1999 for a full 8-year term, and again in 2007 and 2015 He is now the longest serving Clerk of Court and constitutional officer in Wise County history as he completes his last term 31 December 2023. During his tenure, Kennedy led the management of the paper-to-digital automated systems of the county's historic criminal and civil case files and real estate records from paper ranging from 1856 to digital media early in the 21st century. He led a paradigm shift in the use of judicial information technology throughout Virginia on several fronts earning him regional, state, and national accolades during his tenure as an innovator and disrupter 'thought leader.' In 1999, United States Supreme Court Justice Sandra Day O'Conner inducted him into the prestigious Fellow of the Institute for Court Management and gained two commending citations from Virginia Secretaries of Technology and the Office of Executive Secretary of the Virginia Supreme Court for innovations.

Realizing there was no 'official map' of Wise County early in the onset of his first term, he managed the creation of the first Wise County Geographic Information System for Wise County in 2001.

=== Businessman & Attorney ===
Involved in the business community, Kennedy served on the board of Black Diamond Savings Bank until its successful and profitable merger, and several other entrepreneurial start-ups leading him to become a Napoleon Hill Scholar. He is a member of the Virginia State Bar since 1982, maintaining his Virginia license to practice law in good standing throughout his professional career, and gained admission to numerous federal and state courts. He has consulted several domestic and international aviation, aerospace, and logistics companies in more recent years.

=== Serving the State of Virginia & Appalachia at Large ===
Remaining active in state affairs, Kennedy was appointed by multiple governors and served their administrations on the Virginia Commercial Space Flight Authority, the Virginia Aviation Board, the Virginia Aerospace Council, the Virginia Unmanned Aircraft Systems Advisory board, and the Virginia Geographic Information Technology board. He was also appointed to the University of Virginia College at Wise board for a term. A Speaker of the Virginia House of Delegates Speaker recently appointed him to serve on the Virginia-Israel Advisory Board. From these positions, he counseled legislators on policy changes with draft aerospace and technology legislation utilizing his previous experience as a member of the Virginia General Assembly.

During his public tenure, Kennedy frequently reached out to offer STEM education the region's youth through NASA DEVELOP programs using satellite remote sensing data; an International Space Station downlink, including the first female commercial astronaut Anousheh Ansari, NASA astronaut Leland Melvin, a mock-up Robonaut-1, and Moon rock at the University of Virginia's College at Wise for thousands regional youth; Aerospace Days at the Lonesome Pine Airport which included rockets, remote controlled jets, drones and other remote controlled flight vehicles for thousands of spectators; the first FAA-approved drone delivery flight at Lonesome Pine Airport; student space station experiments; student satellites to low Earth orbit launched from Wallops Island, VA; and hundreds of SpaceX Starlink accounts for rural Appalachian Mountain students.

== What's Next for J. Jack Kennedy Jr. ==
At his departure from the Clerk of Court, Kennedy will join his wife Janette F. Kennedy in Cape Canaveral, Florida, enabling him to spend more time engaging in his passion for space exploration technologies and selenology science. He has consulted with Houston, Texas-based Celestis, Inc. to provide services to the firm at Cape Canaveral, and has contracted with Celestis, Inc. to have his cremated remains placed on the lunar surface upon his death.
