= Henry Carter Stuart =

American businessman and politician

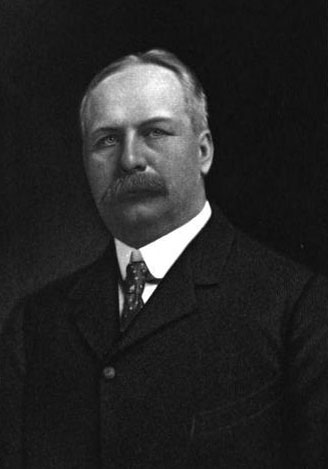
- Stuart in a 1906 publication

47th Governor of Virginia
- In office February 1, 1914 – February 1, 1918
- Preceded by: William Hodges Mann
- Succeeded by: Westmoreland Davis

Member of the Virginia State Corporation Commission
- In office March 1, 1903 – February 28, 1908
- Preceded by: None (commission formed)
- Succeeded by: William F. Rhea

Personal details
- Born: January 18, 1855 Wytheville, Virginia, US
- Died: July 24, 1933 (aged 78) Russell County, Virginia, US
- Party: Democratic
- Spouse: Margaret Bruce Carter
- Profession: Politician, farmer and businessman

Henry Carter Stuart (January 18, 1855 – July 24, 1933) was an American businessman and politician from Virginia. Between 1914 and 1918, he served as the 47th Governor of Virginia, a period which encompassed World War I.

== Early and family life ==
The eldest of seven sons born to William Alexander Stuart and his wife Mary Taylor Carter Stuart, Henry Carter Stuart was born in Wytheville, Virginia. He also had an elder sister, Eliza, who died in 1862. The family owned thousands of acres of ranch land in southwest Virginia, built over generations, including through marriage alliances. Henry Carter Stuart ultimately lived at East Rosedale, a mansion which a maternal ancestor had purchased from Patrick Henry in 1774, and which had been a fort guarding the Clinch River valley during the American Revolutionary War. His paternal grandfather, Archibald Stuart, a lawyer and U.S. Congressman, had several sons, one of whom (Henry's uncle) became Confederate Civil War Cavalry Commander Jeb Stuart. His middle name (and his nephew's first name) reflects his maternal grandfather, Dale Carter, a wealthy lawyer who served a term in each house of the Virginia General Assembly.

A graduate of Emory and Henry College (1874), Henry married his cousin, Margaret Bruce Carter in 1896, but they had no children. His nephew of the same name, but nicknamed Harry Carter Stuart, son of this Stuart's brother and business partner Dale Carter Stuart, later became a Virginia State Senator and was active in the Massive Resistance movement.

== Career ==
Stuart was born to wealth, and became wealthier. Upon their father's death in 1893, he and his brothers Alexander ("Zan") and Dale Carter Stuart took over their father's salt company (which by then had become a cattle company). They built Stuart Land & Cattle Company into the largest cattle company east of the Mississippi River, with 50,000 agricultural acres in four counties. Generations of fathers and sons worked for the company, and many lived in its semi-feudal company towns which attempted to control their access to liquor. The cattle company and other Stuart enterprises also controlled extensive coal and timber reserves. Ironically, Henry Stuart's only child, Mary Fulton, rebelled against her father's country lifestyle and values.

Stuart started his political activity in 1893, after their father's death. He organizing a statewide referendum for popular election of senators because his favorite candidate, Fitzhugh Lee (former governor and a nephew of Robert E. Lee) had not been selected for U.S. Senate from Virginia by the Virginia General Assembly, which instead elevated an obscure railroad attorney, Thomas Staples Martin. Over the years, Stuart became more aligned with the Democratic political machine run by Martin, but favored farmers more than railroads. Thus, Stuart at the State Corporation Commission regulated railroads and increased what had been extremely low corporate taxes, all of which were popular statewide.

As Russell County's delegate to the Virginia Constitutional Convention of 1901-1902, Stuart helped reform the Reconstruction Era Underwood constitution in many ways. However the new 1902 Constitution also instituted poll taxes and other requirements which disenfranchised many African Americans and poor whites, but facilitated the growth of the Martin political machine, which later became the Byrd Organization. Stuart also served in the State Corporation Commission from 1902 to 1908. Although Stuart wanted to run for governor in 1909, he acceded to Martin's advice and instead ran for U.S. Congress, but lost to six-term Republican Campbell Bascom Slemp.

In return for that party loyalty, Martin allowed Stuart to run for governor unopposed. Governor Stuart promoted a statewide referendum that prohibited alcohol sales. He also appointed a commission that in 1919 revised the Virginia Code (for the first time in 1887), as well as enacted legislation which rationalized taxation, so local counties could tax real estate and the state other forms of property. This raised state revenues by almost $750,000. in 1915, Stuart endorsed the state senatorial bid of Harry F. Byrd, who a decade later would control what had been the Martin organization. World War I became the major event in Stuart's administration, and he encouraged Virginians to grow food in home gardens to support the national war effort. Stuart also declared martial law in Hopewell, Virginia, a boom town that grew around a munitions plant.

After Stuart's gubernatorial term ended, he served on the federal War Industries Board, then in 1921 formed the "Pay as You Go Roads Association" which fought issuance of road construction bonds to build better highways. The bond-financed highway construction of the Virginia Turnpike System in the area before the Civil War had been disastrous, and led to many bankruptcies.

== Election ==
1913; Stuart was elected Governor of Virginia with 91.87% of the vote, defeating Socialist C. Campbell and Socialist Labor B.D. Downey.

== Death and legacy ==
After Henry Carter Stuart's death, the mansion he built in the valley of the Elk Garden River and lived in remained in the Stuart family until 1945. However, "East Rosedale" burned to the ground after a lightning storm in 2002.

Party political offices
Preceded by William Hodges Mann	Democratic nominee for Governor of Virginia; 1913	Succeeded by Westmoreland Davis
Political offices
Preceded by William Hodges Mann	Governor of Virginia; 1914–1918	Succeeded by Westmoreland Davis
