= Jack W. Witten =

American politician (1879–1959)

Member of the Virginia House of Delegates from the Tazewell County district
- In office 1944–1957
- Succeeded by: Grady W. Dalton
- In office 1924–1934

Member of the Virginia Senate from the 18th district
- In office 1936–1938
- Succeeded by: Harry Carter Stuart

Personal details
- Born: Jack Walter Witten; August 7, 1880 Tazewell County, Virginia, U.S.
- Died: October 30, 1959 (aged 79) North Tazewell, Virginia, U.S.
- Resting place: Maplewood Cemetery
- Education: Tazewell College; Medical College of Virginia
- Occupation: Politician; physician

Jack Walter Witten (August 7, 1880 – October 30, 1959) was an American politician and physician from Virginia. He served as a member of the Virginia House of Delegates from 1924 to 1934 and later from 1944 to 1957. He served one term in the Virginia Senate from 1936 to 1938.

== Early life ==
Jack Walter Witten was born on August 7, 1880, in Tazewell County, Virginia, to Virginia Catherine (née Custer) and Robert Baity Witten. Witten moved to Tazewell, Virginia, and attended public schools there. He graduated from Tazewell College. He graduated from the Medical College of Virginia in 1905. He interned at Richmond City Hospital.

== Career ==
In 1906, Witten opened his medical office in Tazewell. In 1907, Witten was a physician at the Jamestown Exposition. He served in the U.S. Army during World War I. For a short time, he also worked at a hospital for a copper mine in Arizona. After the war, in October 1919, he was appointed examiner of the U.S. Public Health in North Tazewell for wounded soldiers. He was commissioned as major in 1920. He worked as a physician in Tazewell County for over 50 years.

Witten served in the Virginia House of Delegates, representing Tazewell County, from 1924 to 1934. He then served in the Virginia Senate from 1936 to 1938. He served again in the Virginia House of Delegates from 1944 to 1957. He lost his re-election campaign in 1957 to Grady W. Dalton. Four of the boys he took in served as pages during his legislative career.

Later in life, Witten and his friends organized the Dr. J. W. Witten Home Foundation to support Witten's support for homeless boys.

== Personal life ==
Witten remained a bachelor throughout his life. In 1907, he promised a dying widowed woman that she would take in a seven-year-old boy. Around 1926, he took in an additional boy and over the years he took in more boys and at one point about 20 boys lived at his home. According to his obituaries, he raised between 175 and 250 boys over the years. In the early 1940s, he bought a 200 acres (81 ha) farm and produced food for his family.

Witten died of a heart attack on October 30, 1959, at his home in North Tazewell. He was buried in Maplewood Cemetery.

== Awards and legacy ==
In 1949, the Medical College of Virginia recognized Witten as alumnus of the year. In 1956, he was awarded for his work with homeless boys by the Lane Bryant awards committee. On February 13, 1958, the Virginia House of Delegates passed a resolution to honor Witten's support for homeless boys.

In 1963, Witten's home was sold. After his death, his personal papers, citations, election certificates, service records and decorations were donated to Breaks Park Museum.

In 1973, Tom Chung, one of Witten's boys, established a scholarship at Tazewell High School in his honor.
