= Will Morefield =

American politician (born 1984)

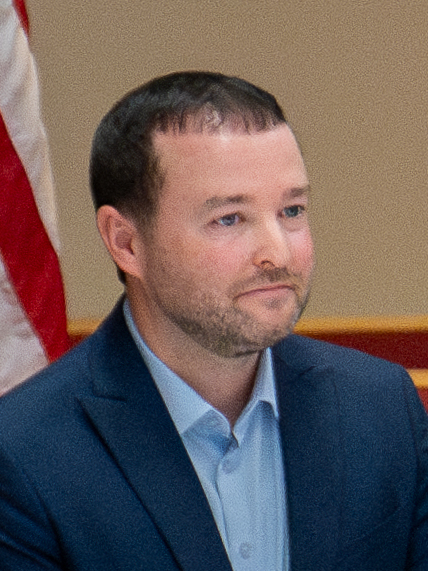
- Morefield in 2025

Member of the Virginia House of Delegates
- Incumbent
- Assumed office January 13, 2010
- Preceded by: Dan C. Bowling
- Constituency: 3rd district (2010–2024); 43rd district (2024–present)

Personal details
- Born: James Will Morefield; January 10, 1984 (age 42) Bluefield, West Virginia, U.S.
- Party: Republican
- Education: Midwestern State University; King University
- Committees: Militia, Police, and Public Safety; Counties, Cities, and Towns; General Laws; Agriculture, Chesapeake and Natural Resources
- Website: http://www.morefieldfordelegate.com

James William Joseph Morefield (born January 10, 1984) is an American politician of the Republican Party. Since January 2010 Morefield has been a member of the Virginia House of Delegates, representing the 43rd district in the southwestern part of the state. He serves on the House Committees on Counties, Cities, and Towns; Militia, Police, and Public Safety; General Laws; and Agriculture, Chesapeake and Natural Resources.

== Political career ==
On November 3, 2009, Will Morefield defeated Democratic incumbent Dan Bowling in the race for Virginia's 3rd District in the Virginia House of Delegates. Morefield's election was considered the beginning of Southwest Virginia's shift from being an ancestral Democratic voting area to a solidly Republican voting area.

In the 2016 election cycle Morefield endorsed former Florida Governor Jeb Bush for president, but later switched his endorsement for U.S. Senator for Florida Marco Rubio. After Donald Trump secured the Republican nomination for President in 2016, Morefield endorsed and supported Trump.

== Electoral history ==
Date	Election	Candidate	Party	Votes	%
Virginia House of Delegates, 3rd district
November 3, 2009	General	James W. "Will" Morefield	Republican	8,665	57.10
November 3, 2009	General	Danny C. "Dan" Bowling	Democratic	6,499	42.82
November 3, 2009	General	Write Ins		10	0.06
November 3, 2009	General	Incumbent lost; seat switched from Democratic to Republican			
November 8, 2011	General	James W. "Will" Morefield	Republican	13,316	59.67
November 8, 2011	General	Russell Vern Presley II	Democratic	8,994	40.30
November 8, 2011	General	Write Ins		6	0.02
November 5, 2013	General	James W. "Will" Morefield	Republican	12,291	70.52
November 5, 2013	General	James M. O'Quinn	Democratic	5,188	29.65
November 5, 2013	General	Write Ins		17	0.10
November 3, 2015	General	James W. "Will" Morefield	Republican	14,325	99.2
November 3, 2015	General	Write Ins		119	0.8
November 7, 2017	General	James W. "Will" Morefield	Republican	13,572	78.1
November 7, 2017	General	William C. Bunch, Jr.	Democratic	3,759	21.6
November 7, 2017	General	Write Ins		41	0.2
November 5, 2019	General	James W. "Will" Morefield	Republican	17,099	98.03
November 5, 2019	General	Write Ins		343	1.97
