= William C. Wampler =

American journalist

William C. Wampler Sr.
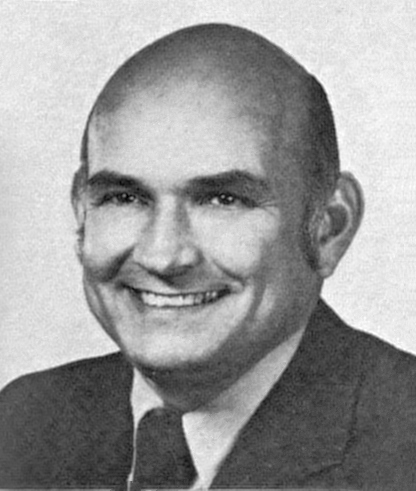

Member of the U.S. House of Representatives from Virginia's 9th district
- In office January 3, 1967 – January 3, 1983
- Preceded by: W. Pat Jennings
- Succeeded by: Rick Boucher
- In office January 3, 1953 – January 3, 1955
- Preceded by: Thomas B. Fugate
- Succeeded by: W. Pat Jennings

Personal details
- Born: William Creed Wampler; April 21, 1926 Pennington Gap, Virginia, U.S.
- Died: May 23, 2012 (aged 86) Bristol, Virginia, U.S.
- Party: Republican
- Spouse(s): Mary Baker; Lee McCall
- Education: Virginia Tech (B.A.)
- Occupation: newspaperman

Military service
- Allegiance: United States
- Branch/service: United States Navy
- Years of service: 1943–1945
- Unit: U.S. Naval Reserve
- Battles/wars: World War II

William Creed Wampler Sr. (April 21, 1926 – May 23, 2012) was an American newspaperman, businessman and Republican politician who served multiple terms in the United States House of Representatives.

== Early and family life ==
Born in Pennington Gap near the center of Lee County, Virginia, on April 21, 1926, to hardware store proprietor John Sevier Wampler and his schoolteacher wife, the former Lilian May Wolfe, the child nicknamed Bill Wampler attended the public schools in Bristol, Virginia. He had two older brothers (John S. Wampler Sr. and James A. Wampler) and as the Great Depression ended the family had a live-in maid/lodger.

When Wampler became old enough to enlist, he did, in the United States Navy on May 21, 1943. Thus, during World War II, he served as a seaman for twenty-eight months until discharged on September 29, 1945. He then continued as a member of the Naval Reserve, V-6 for many years. Using the GI Bill, Wampler resumed his education and graduated from Virginia Polytechnic Institute in Blacksburg, Virginia with a degree in political science in 1948. He then began studying law at the University of Virginia from 1948 to 1950, but left before receiving a degree.

He married Mary Elizabeth Baker on August 23, 1953, in Scott, Tennessee. They had daughter, Barbara Wampler, and a son, William Creed Wampler, Jr. (who would later represent Virginia's 40th Senatorial District) before divorcing in 1976. On July 25, 1977, he remarried in the Episcopal Church in Bristol, to Mary Lee McCall Frackelton.

== Career ==
Wampler worked as a reporter for The Tennessean in 1950 and 1951. He then became a reporter and editorial writer for Big Stone Gap (Virginia) Post in 1951. Wampler then moved to Bristol, Virginia on the Tennessee line where he worked as reporter and copy editor for the Bristol Herald Courier in 1951 and 1952.

Wampler was a member of the board of visitors of Emory and Henry College in Emory, Virginia and was Republican assistant campaign manager for 9th congressional district elections in 1948. He was also the president of the Young Republican Federation of Virginia in 1950 and served as keynote speaker and permanent chairman of the 9th district Republican Convention the same year.

Wampler won election as a Republican to the 83rd Congress (January 3, 1953 – January 3, 1955), during which time he was its youngest member.

After losing his campaign for reelection in 1954 to the 84th Congress, Wampler received a job working for the U.S. Atomic Energy Commission during the administration of President Dwight D. Eisenhower, which he held from January 1955 to March 1956.

However, Wampler returned to Virginia to assist at the family furniture and carpeting businesses as well as to campaign again. However, he lost again in 1956 to the 85th Congress to William Pat Jennings, receiving only 45% of the vote.

Thus Wampler worked as vice president and general manager of Wampler Brothers Furniture Company in Bristol from 1957 to 1960, then became the vice president and general manager of Wampler Carpet Company from 1961 to 1966. He also worked on the campaigns of other Republican candidates.

As the Byrd Organization collapsed along with its policy of massive resistance to the 1954 and 1955 school desegregation decisions of the United States Supreme Court in Brown v. Board of Education, Wampler won election to the 90th Congress, defeating William Pat Jennings by winning 53.7% of the votes cast. Jennings had defeated four other Republican candidates for the seat in the interim. Wampler was re-elected to the seven succeeding Congresses, serving from January 3, 1967 – January 3, 1983. He won re-election in 1968 with 59.9% of the vote, in 1970 with 62.5%, 1972 with 71.9% and after the Watergate scandal in 1974 narrowly won with 50.9%, then increased his margin against the same opponent in 1976 to 57.3%. Wampler won in 1978 with 61.9% of the votes cast and in 1980 won with 69.4%. However, Wampler narrowly lost his re-election campaign in 1982 to Democrat Frederick C. Boucher, who won 50.4% of the votes cast. In Congress, Wampler advocated for Appalachian coal miners, and also served on the Agriculture Committee.

In 1982, Democrat Rick Boucher defeated the 16 year incumbent Wampler by 1,100 votes, and won re-election for decades. Wampler then stopped running for public office on his own behalf, but continued active in politics behind the scenes, his son William C. Wampler, Jr. first winning election a Republican from Bristol to the Virginia Senate in 1988.

== Death and legacy ==
Wampler died in Bristol on May 23, 2012. The section of Interstate 81 from the Tennessee line to the Christiansburg exit has been renamed in his honor.

His son, William C. Wampler, Jr., won re-election until 2012. His grandson, William C. Wampler III first won a seat in the Virginia House of Delegates in 2019.

U.S. House of Representatives
Preceded by Thomas B. Fugate	Member of the U.S. House of Representatives from Virginia's 9th congressional district January 3, 1953 – January 3, 1955	Succeeded by W. Pat Jennings
Preceded by W. Pat Jennings	Member of the U.S. House of Representatives from Virginia's 9th congressional district January 3, 1967 – January 3, 1983	Succeeded by Rick Boucher
