= Phillip Puckett =

American politician

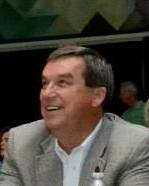

Member of the Virginia Senate from the 38th district
- In office December 29, 1998 – June 9, 2014
- Preceded by: Jackson Reasor
- Succeeded by: Ben Chafin

Personal details
- Born: August 10, 1947 (age 79) Russell County, Virginia, U.S.
- Party: Democratic
- Spouse: Jeanette Griffith
- Education: University of Tennessee; Virginia Tech
- Occupation: Banking

Phillip P. Puckett (born August 10, 1947 in Russell County, Virginia) is an American politician. A Democrat, he was elected to the Senate of Virginia in 1998 and resigned on June 9, 2014. He represented the 38th district, made up of five counties and parts of four others in the southwestern part of the state.

== Career ==
In December, 1998, Puckett defeated two opponents to win a Special Election for the 38th Senatorial District, replacing Jackson E. Reasor, Jr., who had been Senator from 1992 to 1998 (then CEO and President of both the Old Dominion Electric Cooperative, and the VMDA, since 1998).

He went on to win in four General Elections—1999, 2003, 2007, and 2011—running unopposed in 2003 and 2007. In 2005, Puckett ran for Lieutenant Governor of Virginia. He finished last in the Democratic primary, behind Leslie L. Byrne, Viola Baskerville, and Chap Petersen.

== Resignation ==
Puckett resigned from the Senate on Monday, June 9, 2014, citing family reasons. At that time, Virginia's politicians had been in an impasse over the budget and consideration of the expansion of Medicaid. "The GOP-dominated House [was] firmly opposed, and the disagreement [had] led to a budget standoff that could trigger a government shutdown [if not resolved in under a month]." The Senate had been evenly split, although it was "leaning toward supporting" the governor's expansion program, but, in the 40-seat Senate, Puckett's resignation gave Republicans a 20-19 majority.

In a statement regarding Puckett's resignation, Governor Terry McAuliffe said that he was disappointed because of the impact it would have on negotiations over his desire to expand Medicaid coverage for approximately 400,000 low-income Virginians.

"Under a rule that Senate Clerk Susan Clarke Schaar said had not been exercised in at least 40 years, Republicans on Monday used their new sway to call the Senate back into session Thursday." The newly GOP-dominated Senate joined the GOP-dominated House of Delegates in voting against Medicaid expansion and passing a budget. On June 15, "at the urging of House Speaker William J. Howell, the clerk’s office of the House of Delegates enlisted the help of the Capitol Police to enter Gov. Terry McAuliffe’s unoccupied, secure suite of offices on a Sunday afternoon to deliver the state budget."

Puckett's resignation coincided with an alleged offer by the Virginia Republican Party to appoint him as the deputy director of the state tobacco commission, although, following criticism, he announced he would not accept the appointment. "Del. Terry G. Kilgore, R-Scott, chairman of the tobacco commission, acknowledged that he had spoken to Puckett before his resignation about taking a job with the commission." Puckett disputed resigning to take a position with the commission, and said "he was stepping aside in part for unspecified 'difficult issues' facing his family. Several people close to Puckett said he had confided that a health issue is involved."

In a statement, Puckett said part of the reason for his resignation was to "allow his daughter…to serve as a juvenile court judge. It was not, he said, because the judgeship was being offered as part of a back-room deal." In 2013, Puckett's daughter, Martha P. Ketron, was appointed as an interim judge in the Juvenile and Domestic Relations Court by judges of the 29th District Circuit Court. In February 2014, Ketron was confirmed by the Virginia House of Delegates to fill a six-year term for the Juvenile and Domestic Relations District Court. A six-year appointment also requires confirmation from the Senate of Virginia, but some of the members cited an informal policy that family members of current legislators are typically not appointed to the judiciary. Republican legislators planned to confirm Puckett's daughter to her full six-year term following his resignation.

Citizens for Responsibility and Ethics in Washington subsequently asked the United States Attorney for the Eastern District of Virginia to investigate whether Puckett violated federal anti-corruption laws by resigning from office in exchange for offers of appointment to the tobacco commission, and that of his daughter's appointment to a state judgeship. The DOJ and the FBI subsequently launched an investigation into the circumstances surrounding Puckett's resignation. Puckett retained a former federal prosecutor, Thomas J. Bondurant Jr., as his lawyer.

=== Related events ===
On August 19, 2014, Del. Ben Chafin, R-Russell County, won a special election for the 38th Senatorial District seat. He defeated Democrat Mike Hymes, a Tazewell County supervisor, and independent Rick Mullins.

In October 2014, it was acknowledged that Gov. McAuliffe's chief of staff, Paul Reagan, had "left a voice-mail message for a Democrat who was on the verge of quitting the General Assembly in June, saying that the senator's daughter might get a top state job if he stayed to support the governor's push to expand Medicaid."

In December 2014, federal prosecutors dropped the inquiry begun in June. "The U.S. Attorney’s Office will not seek federal criminal charges surrounding the June resignation of state Sen. Phillip Puckett, D-Russell County."

In January, 2015, Virginia’s House and Senate approved the six-year judicial appointment for Martha Ketron. While many Democrats protested the appointment, "in keeping with tradition in a Capitol that prides itself on civility, those opposed to the nominee chose to abstain rather than to cast a vote against her."
