= Stuart Land & Cattle Company =

American cattle ranching company

The Stuart Land & Cattle Company, operating since 1774 and formally established in 1884, is one of the oldest and longest-running family-owned ranching operations in the United States. For over a century, it was the largest cattle ranch east of the Mississippi River.

== Company history ==
In 1884, William Alexander Stuart, brother of Confederate General J. E. B. Stuart, formally organized the Stuart Land & Cattle Company, consolidating extensive family landholdings across Russell, Tazewell, and Washington counties. His wife, Mary, brought a dowry of 80,000 acres that she had inherited from her family, cattle farming land operated since 1774 when it was initially granted to one of her ancestors by Patrick Henry.

Henry Carter Stuart, son of William Alexander Stuart, played a pivotal role in the company's development. Serving as Governor of Virginia from 1914 to 1918, he was known for his knowledge of agriculture and commitment to progressive reforms. Under his guidance, the company became a model for sustainable farming practices. This was evident in their early adoption of artificial insemination, unique weaning strategies, and improved grazing management techniques tailored to the mountainous terrain of Southwest Virginia.

Stuart Land & Cattle Company managed over 50,000 acres of farmland at its height, making it the largest ranching operation east of the Mississippi River. The company's holdings included the Clifton, Rosedale, Rich Mountain, and Elk Garden farms. A three-breed rotation system involving over 1,600 Angus, Simmental, and Gelbvieh cattle was implemented to maximize heterosis benefits in both the cow herd and calf crop.

Today, the company has over 20,000 acres of holdings.

=== Conservation efforts ===
A portion of the Stuart Land & Cattle Company land holdings are enrolled in The Nature Conservancy Conservation Forestry Program, ensuring sustainable timber harvesting while protecting critical habitats for migratory songbirds and threatened aquatic species in the Clinch River.

== Awards and recognition ==
- In 2007, the Virginia Beef Cattle Improvement Association honored the Stuart Land & Cattle Company as the Virginia Outstanding Commercial Producer of the Year, recognizing its leadership and contributions to the cattle industry.
- In 2012, the company was a finalist in the annual Resilience Awards of the University of Virginia's Darden School of Business.
- In 2015, the company was the subject of a new book titled Working for Stuarts: Life on One of the Oldest and Largest Cattle Farms East of the Mississippi.

== See also ==
- Henry Carter Stuart
