= John C. Buchanan (Virginia politician) =

American physician and politician

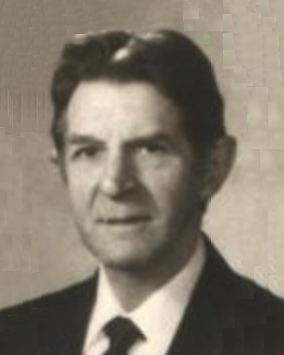

Member of the Virginia Senate from the 40th district
- In office January 12, 1972 – April 15, 1991
- Preceded by: Macon M. Long
- Succeeded by: Jack Kennedy

Personal details
- Born: John Chalkley Buchanan; January 20, 1911 Darwin, Virginia, U.S.
- Died: April 15, 1991 (aged 80) Wise, Virginia, U.S.
- Party: Democratic
- Spouse: Carol Phipps (m. 1945)
- Education: University of Virginia (BS, MD)
- Occupation: Physician; politician

Military service
- Branch/service: United States Navy
- Years of service: 1942–1946
- Battles/wars: World War II

John Chalkley Buchanan (January 20, 1911 – April 15, 1991) was an American physician and politician who served in the Virginia Senate from his election in 1971 up to his death from cancer 20 years later. He chaired the Senate's General Laws committee.
