= Virginia's 3rd House of Delegates district =

Virginia legislative district

Virginia's 3rd State House of Delegates district
- District map from the 2023 election
Delegate
Alfonso Lopez; D–Arlington
- Demographics: 48% White; 14% Black; 26% Hispanic; 8% Asian; 0% Native American; 0% Hawaiian/Pacific Islander; 1% Other; 4% Multiracial
- Population (2024) • Voting age: 84,481; 18
- Registered voters: 58,890

Virginia's 3rd House of Delegates district is one of 100 seats in the Virginia House of Delegates, the lower house of the state's bicameral legislature. District 3 partially consists of Arlington County and Alexandria City. Democrat Alfonso Lopez is the current representative.

== Elections ==
=== 2017 ===
In 2017, Morefield, 33, faced a primary challenge from attorney Bob Altizer, who promises to be an accessible legislator and to stand up for the interests of the coal industry. Altizer's prospects of winning the nomination seem to be bolstered by his having on his side former Buchannan County Commonwealth's Attorney Tamara Neo and former 9th District Chairman Jack Morgan, both of whom were part of Donald Trump's political leadership team, but in a mass meeting on 29 April, Morefield was selected as the Republican candidate.

In the November 2017 general election, Morefield, a four-term incumbent, was challenged by Democrat Bill Bunch. Bunch, 68, is a retired postal worker. However, Bunch was unable to win the seat and Morefield kept his position as incumbent.

== District officeholders ==
Years	Delegate	Party	Electoral history
– 1989	Donald A. McGlothlin	Democratic	Defeated in bid for reelection
1989 – January 11, 2006	Jackie Stump	Democratic	Originally elected as an Independent; Retired
January 11, 2006 – January 13, 2010	Dan Bowling	Democratic	Defeated in bid for reelection
January 13, 2010 – January 10, 2024	Will Morefield	Republican	First elected in 2010. Redistricted to the 45th District.
January 10, 2024 – present	Alfonso Lopez	Democratic	Redistricted from the 49th District.

== Electoral history ==
Date	Election	Candidate	Party	Votes	%	
Virginia House of Delegates, 3rd district
Nov 3, 2009	General	James W. "Will" Morefield	Republican	8,665	57.10	
Nov 3, 2009	General	Danny C. "Dan" Bowling	Democratic	6,499	42.82	
Nov 3, 2009	General	Write Ins		10	0.06	
Nov 3, 2009	General	Incumbent lost; seat switched from Democratic to Republican				
Nov 8, 2011	General	James W. "Will" Morefield	Republican	13,316	59.67	
Nov 8, 2011	General	Russell Vern Presley II	Democratic	8,994	40.30	
Nov 8, 2011	General	Write Ins		6	0.02	
Nov 5, 2013	General	James W. "Will" Morefield	Republican	12,291	70.52	
Nov 5, 2013	General	James M. O'Quinn	Democratic	5,188	29.65	
Nov 5, 2013	General	Write Ins		17	0.10	
Nov 3, 2015	General	James W. "Will" Morefield	Republican	14,325	99.2	
Nov 3, 2015	General	Write Ins		119	0.8	
Nov 7, 2017	General	James W. "Will" Morefield	Republican	13,572	78.1	
Nov 7, 2017	General	William C. "Bill" Bunch Jr.	Democratic	3,759	21.6	
Nov 7, 2017	General	Write Ins		41	0.2	
Nov 5, 2019	General	James W. "Will" Morefield	Republican	17,099	98.0	
Nov 5, 2019	General	Write Ins		343	2.0	
Nov 2, 2021	General	James W. "Will" Morefield	Republican	21,193	97.8	
Nov 2, 2021	General	Write Ins		479	2.2	
Nov 7, 2023	General	Alfonso H. Lopez	Democratic	17,416	81.7	
Nov 7, 2023	General	Maj. Mike Weber	Independent	3,651	17.1	
Nov 7, 2023	General	Maj. Mike Weber	Write Ins		260	1.2
