= Virginia's 38th Senate district =

American legislative district

- District map following the 2021 redistricting
- Senator: Jennifer Boysko
- Demographics: 92% White; 4% Black/African American; 1% Asian; 1% Hispanic
- Population: 192,313
- Registered voters: 122,534

Virginia's 38th Senate district elects one of the 40 members of the Virginia Senate, which is the upper house of the state's bicameral legislature, the Virginia General Assembly. It is currently represented by Jennifer Boysko.

== Geography ==
District 38 includes parts of Fairfax County. Following the 2021 Virginia redistricting, the district was formed from parts of the 31st, 32nd, and 33rd Virginia Senate districts.

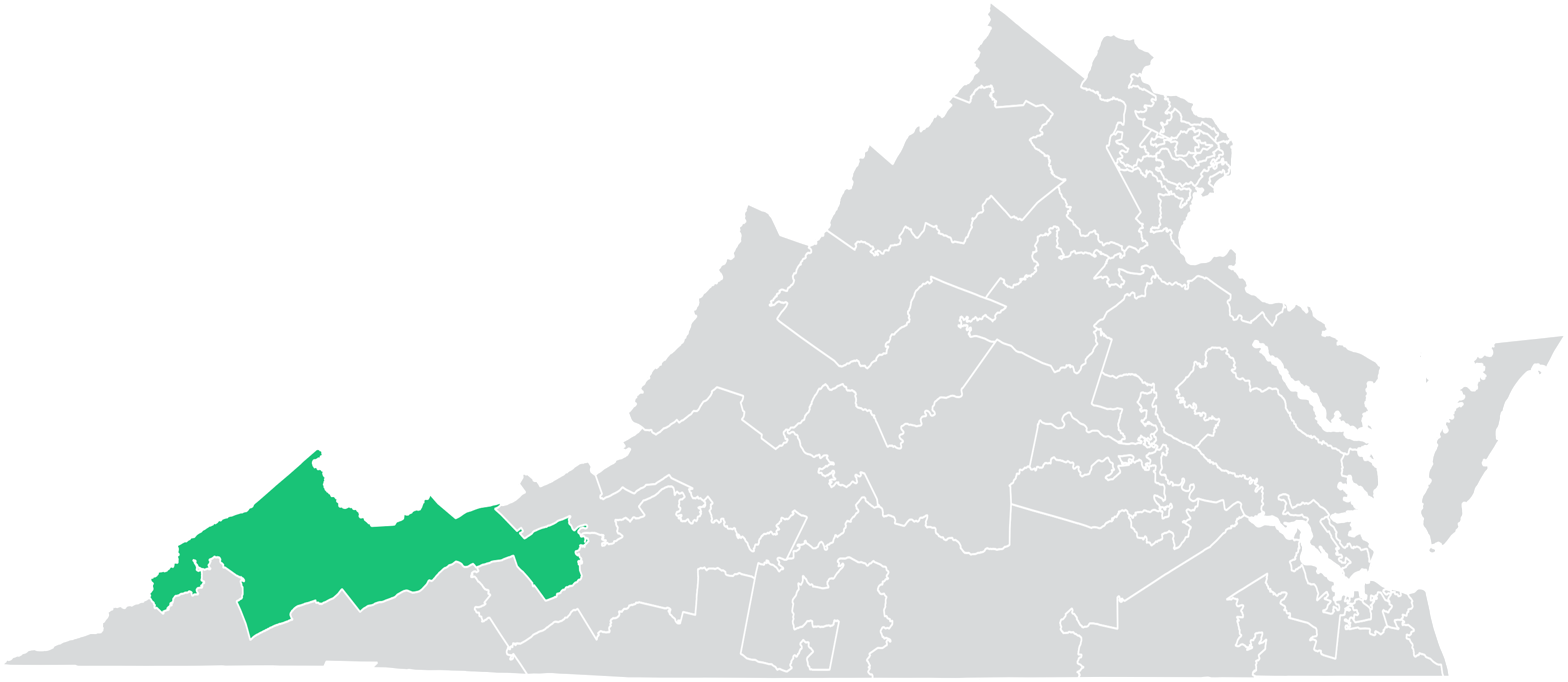
District map before the 2021 redistricting

== Recent election results ==
=== 2021 special ===
2021 Virginia Senate special election, District 38
Party	Candidate	Votes	%
Republican	Travis Hackworth	18,082	76.3
Democratic	Laurie Buchwald	5,585	23.6
Total votes		23,706	100
Republican hold			

=== 2019 ===
2019 Virginia Senate election, District 38
Party	Candidate	Votes	%
Republican	Ben Chafin (incumbent)	30,295	63.6
Independent	George McCall III	16,784	35.3
Total votes		47,607	100
Republican hold			

=== 2015 ===
2015 Virginia Senate election, District 38
Party	Candidate	Votes	%
Republican	Ben Chafin (incumbent)	31,025	98.3
Total votes		31,562	100
Republican hold			

=== 2014 special ===
County and independent city results Chafin: 40–50%; 50–60%; 60–70%; 70–80%; Mullins: 30–40%

2014 Virginia Senate special election, District 38
Party	Candidate	Votes	%
Republican	Ben Chafin	17,496	59.6
Democratic	Mike Hymes	9,354	31.8
Independent	Rickey Mullins	2,517	8.6
Total votes		29,380	100
Republican gain from Democratic			

=== 2011 ===
County and independent city results Puckett: 50–60%; 60–70%; Light: 50–60%

2011 Virginia Senate election, District 38
Party	Candidate	Votes	%
Democratic	Phillip Puckett (incumbent)	26,339	53.0
Republican	Adam Light	23,328	46.9
Total votes		49,720	100
Democratic hold			

=== Federal and statewide results ===
Year	Office	Results
2020	President	Trump 76.1–22.1%
2017	Governor	Gillespie 72.7–26.3%
2016	President	Trump 74.6–22.2%
2014	Senate	Gillespie 62.1–36.2%
2013	Governor	Cuccinelli 64.4–30.8%
2012	President	Romney 66.9–31.4%
2012	Senate	Allen 64.9–35.1%

== Historical results ==
All election results below took place prior to 2011 redistricting, and thus were under different district lines.

=== 2007 ===
2007 Virginia Senate election, District 38
Party	Candidate	Votes	%
Democratic	Phillip Puckett (incumbent)	28,869	99.3
Total votes		29,060	100
Democratic hold			

=== 2003 ===
2003 Virginia Senate election, District 38
Party	Candidate	Votes	%
Democratic	Phillip Puckett (incumbent)	30,255	99.8
Total votes		30,312	100
Democratic hold			

=== 1999 ===
1999 Virginia Senate election, District 38
Party	Candidate	Votes	%
Democratic	Phillip Puckett (incumbent)	29,120	70.3
Republican	Barney Kidd	12,269	29.6
Total votes		41,401	100
Democratic hold			

=== 1998 special ===
1998 Virginia Senate special election, District 38
Party	Candidate	Votes	%
Democratic	Phillip Puckett	13,670	55.0
Republican	Roger Rife	9,871	39.7
Independent	Jerry Ward	1,293	5.2
Total votes		24,838	100
Democratic hold			

=== 1995 ===
1995 Virginia Senate election, District 38
Party	Candidate	Votes	%
Democratic	Jackson Reasor (incumbent)	27,637	63.7
Republican	Frank Nunez	15,724	36.3
Total votes		43,368	100
Democratic hold			
