= Interstate Railroad =

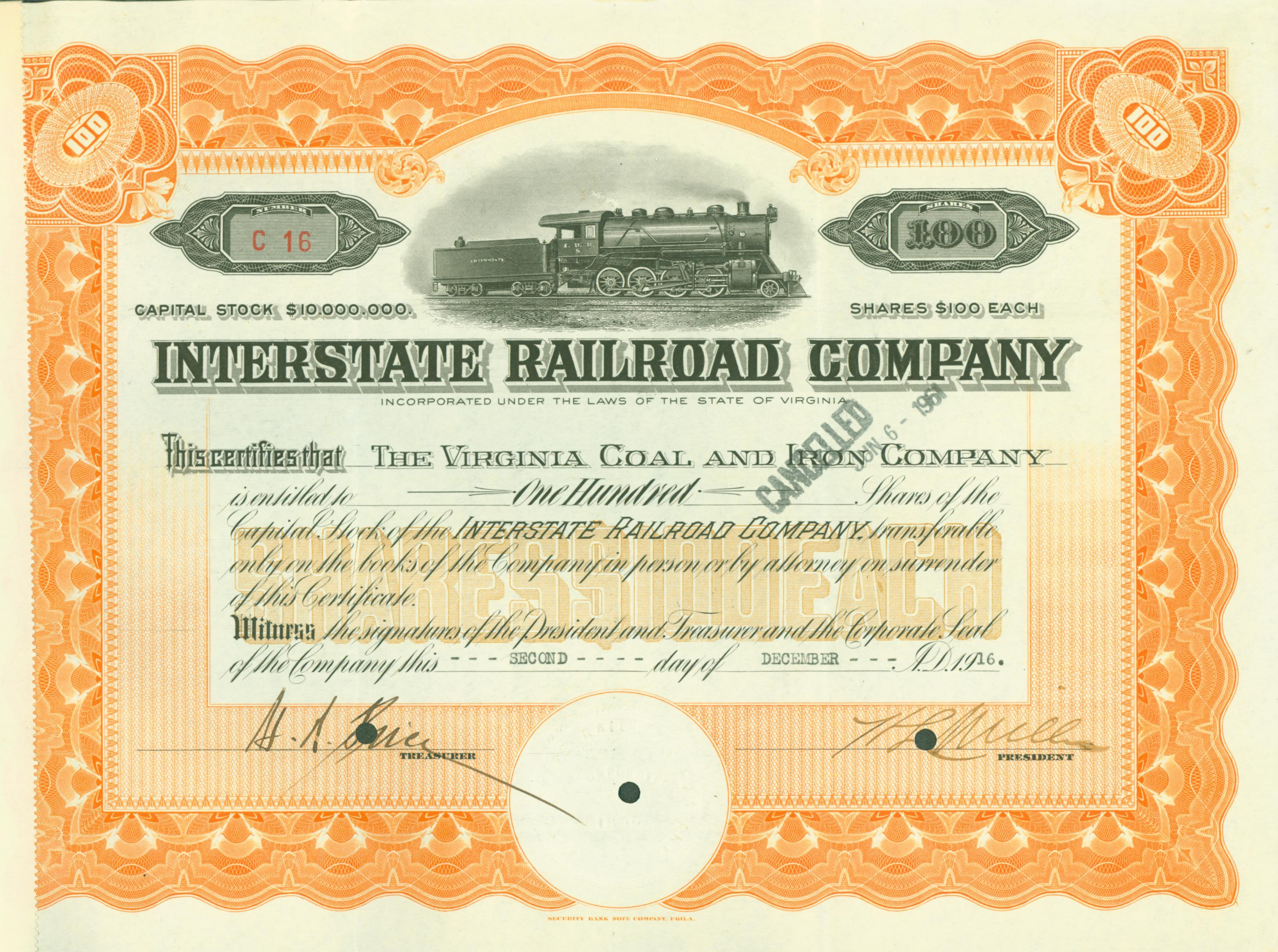
Share of the Interstate Railroad Company, issued 2. December 1916

The Interstate Railroad (reporting mark INT) was a railroad in the southwest part of the U.S. state of Virginia. It extended from the Clinchfield Railroad at Miller Yard in northeastern Scott County north and west to Appalachia and north to the main yard at Andover, with many branches to the north into the mountains. The company still exists as an operating subsidiary of the Norfolk Southern Corporation, but is operated as if it were a Norfolk Southern Railway line.

== Route description ==
The Interstate Railroad generally followed the valleys of the Guest River and Powell River, with only one summit, at Norton, between those two rivers.

The railroad began at the Clinchfield Railroad's Miller Yard, along the Clinch River between Dungannon and Carfax. It started off paralleling the Clinchfield to the northeast until its crossing of the Guest River (the line between Scott County and Wise County). The Interstate crossed the Guest River and split away to the north, running first along its east shore and then along its west shore and through the short Swede Tunnel. The Interstate crossed the Guest River again, where the river turned west, and continued north through another tunnel to Maytown.

At Maytown, the railroad turned west, continuing to follow the Guest River (and crossing it several times) via Riverview, Tacoma, Ramsey, and Hawthorne to Norton, where it interchanged with the Norfolk and Western Railway and Louisville and Nashville Railroad.

The Interstate ran west from Norton to Dooley, where it interchanged with the L&N again (at Dorchester Junction). From there it generally paralleled the Powell River past Josephine, Blackwood, and Kelly View to Appalachia. There it interchanged with the Southern Railway and again with the L&N and turned north alongside Callahan Creek to the main yard at Andover. Several branches continued north alongside creeks, ending at Wentz, Roda, and Derby.

Other branches left the mainline east of Norton (to Glamorgan and Dixiana), at Dorchester Junction (to Needmore), and east of Kelly View at Kent Junction (to Roaring Fork and Pardee). These branches all ran north alongside waterways; the one to Dixiana used the valley of the Guest River, and the one to Needmore ran along the Powell River.

== Heritage unit ==
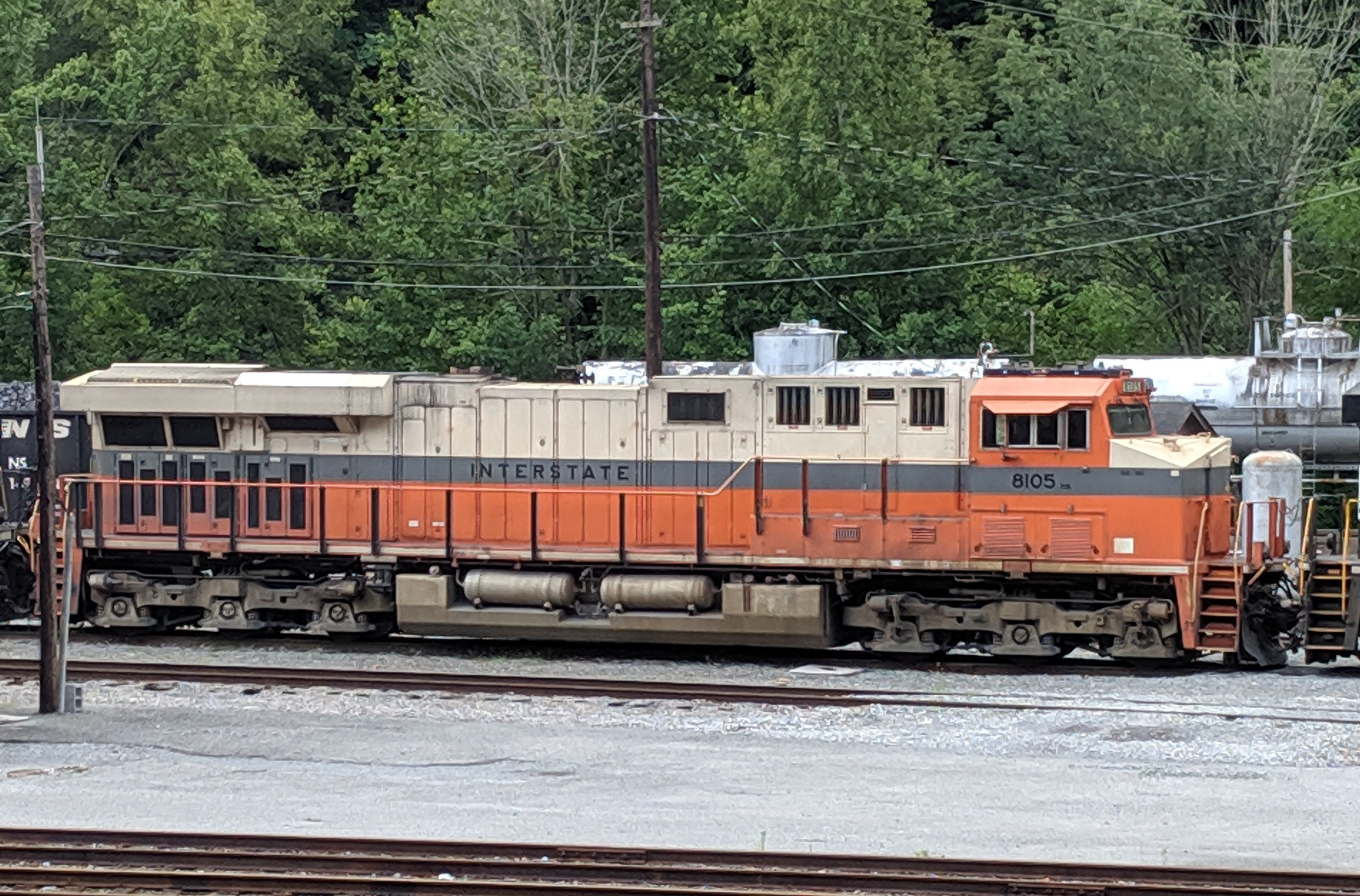
NS Heritage unit 8105 in Interstate Railroad colors at Weller Yard, Grundy, Virginia, June, 2019

As a part of Norfolk Southern's 30th anniversary, the company painted 20 new locomotives into predecessor schemes. NS #8105, a GE ES44AC locomotive, was painted into the Interstate scheme.
