= Appalachia, Virginia =

Appalachia
- Town
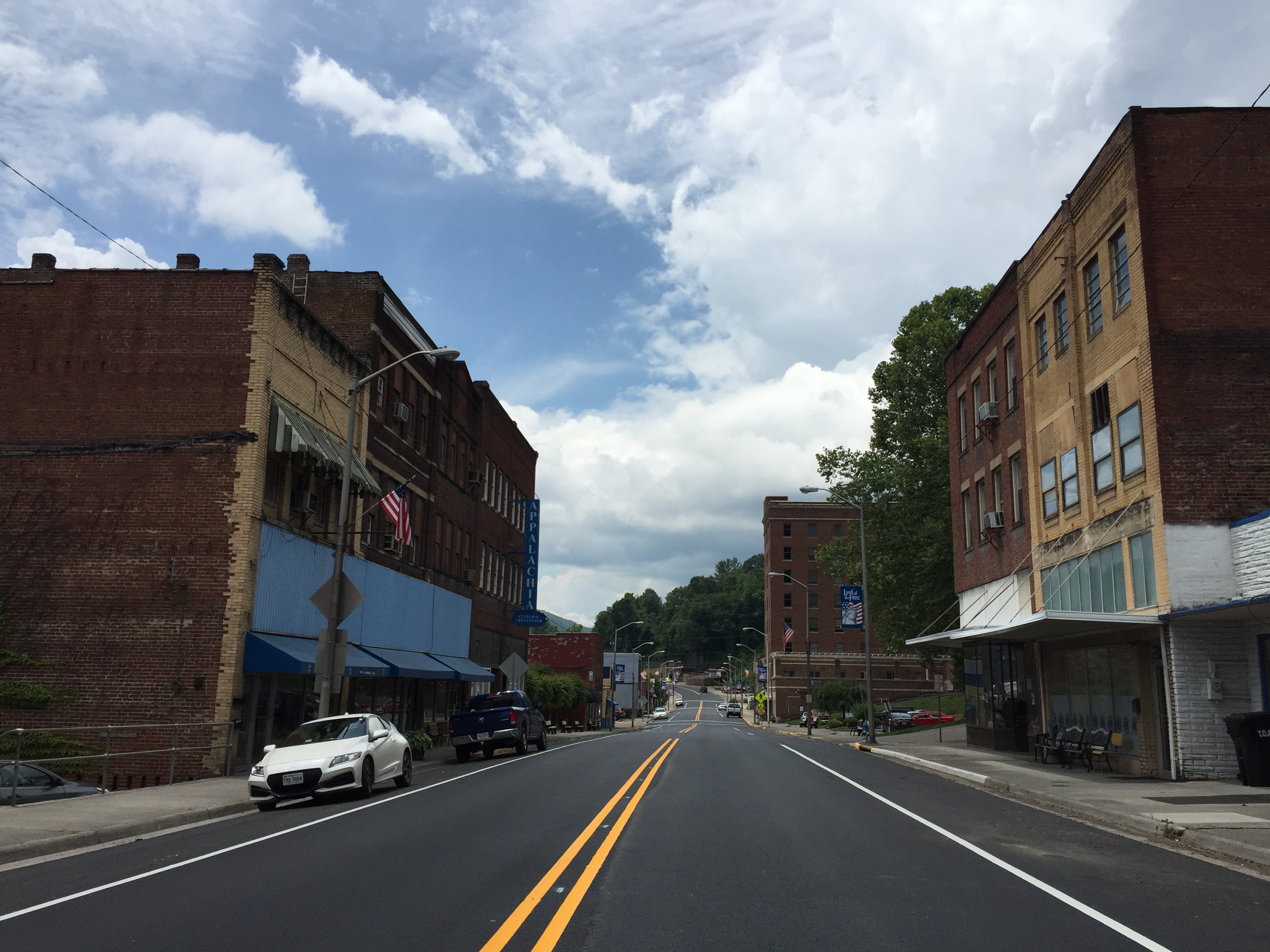
- Main Street looking southwest

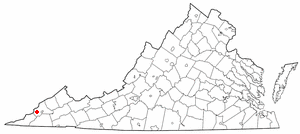
- Location in the Commonwealth of Virginia
- Coordinates: 36°54′23″N 82°47′8″W
- Country: United States
- State: Virginia
- County: Wise

Government
  - Mayor: Chris Williams
  - Vice Mayor: Johnny Chandler
  - Town Manager: Fred Luntsford
  - Town Clerk & Treasurer: Yvonne Isom
  - Town Council: List: Chris Williams (Mayor); Johnny Chandler (Vice Mayor); Eddie Gollaway; Jackie Johnson; Gary Williams

Area
  - Total: 2.31 sq mi (5.97 km^{2})
  - Land: 2.29 sq mi (5.92 km^{2})
  - Water: 0.023 sq mi (0.06 km^{2})
- Elevation: 1,647 ft (502 m)

Population (2020)
  - Total: 1,432
  - Estimate (2019): 1,533
  - Density: 671/sq mi (259.1/km^{2})
- Time zone: UTC−5 (EST)
  - Summer (DST): UTC−4 (EDT)
- ZIP code: 24216
- Area code: 276
- FIPS code: 51-02040
- GNIS feature ID: 1481331
- Website: townofappalachiava.us

Appalachia (/ˌæpəˈlætʃə/) is a town in Wise County, Virginia, United States. As of the 2020 census, Appalachia had a population of 1,432.

== History ==
The Appalachia post office was established in 1898. The community was named for the surrounding Appalachian Mountains. The Derby Historic District, Kelly View School, and Stonega Historic District are listed on the National Register of Historic Places.

Appalachia was formerly home to three railroad companies. The "big three" were the Southern Railway, Louisville & Nashville, and the Interstate Railroad. As of 2022, the Norfolk Southern Railroad is the only operating line through Appalachia, hauling only coal and the occasional ammonium nitrate and limestone aggregate product. These hoppers can be easily identified behind Main Street with the markings of the former railroads painted on the ribbed sides, most reading "Southern" and some "Norfolk & Western".

In 2006, fourteen Appalachia residents, including mayor Ben Cooper and the police chief, were indicted on charges relating to an electoral fraud conspiracy. Cooper was convicted of intercepting absentee ballots and changing the votes on them; buying votes with beer, cigarettes, and pork rinds; and conspiring with his appointee, the police chief, to steal money and other items from residents, among 243 felony charges. Ten other conspirators pleaded guilty and received fines or short jail sentences.

== Geography ==
According to the United States Census Bureau, the town has a total area of 2.3 square miles (6.0 km^{2}), all land.

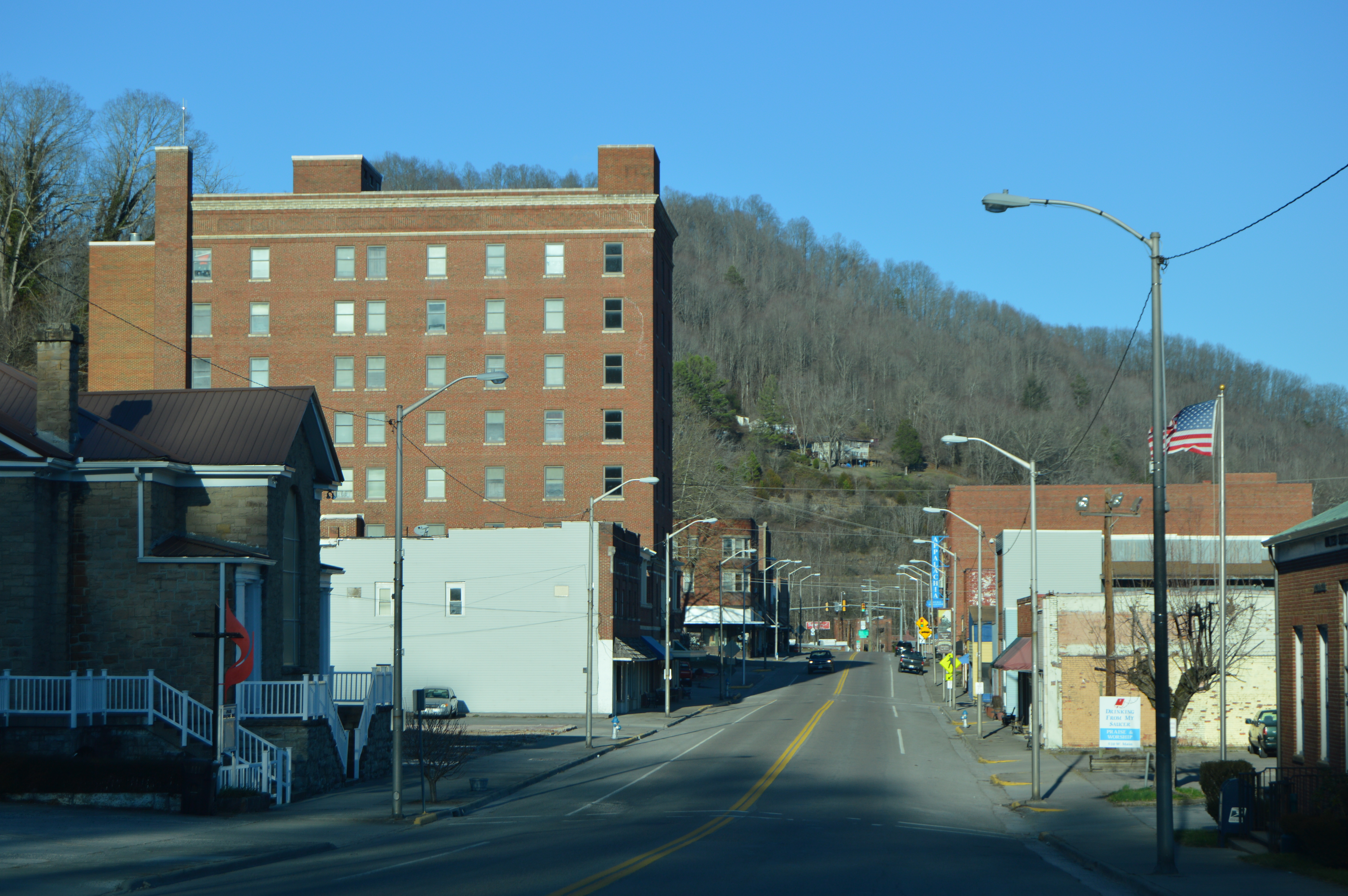
Main Street looking northeast

Appalachia is surrounded by numerous coal camp communities, including Andover, Arno, Derby, Imboden, Exeter, Dunbar, Pardee, Osaka, Roda, and Stonega. Many of these communities formed at the beginning of the 20th-century with the arrival of the mining and railroad industry.

== Demographics ==
Historical population
Census	Pop.	Note	%±
1910	1,090		—
1920	2,036		86.8%
1930	3,595		76.6%
1940	3,010		−16.3%
1950	2,915		−3.2%
1960	2,456		−15.7%
1970	2,161		−12.0%
1980	2,418		11.9%
1990	1,994		−17.5%
2000	1,839		−7.8%
2010	1,754		−4.6%
2020	1,432		−18.4%
2025 (est.)	1,369	▼	−4.4%
U.S. Decennial Census

As of the census of 2000, there were 1,839 people, 790 households, and 515 families living in the town. The population density was 797.3 people per square mile (307.4/km^{2}). There were 891 housing units at an average density of 386.3 per square mile (148.9/km^{2}). The racial makeup of the town was 94.18% White, 4.57% African American, 0.27% Native American, 0.16% Asian, 0.38% from other races, and 0.44% from two or more races. Hispanic or Latino of any race were 1.20% of the population.

There were 790 households, out of which 29.2% had children under the age of 18 living with them, 43.4% were married couples living together, 17.3% had a female householder with no husband present, and 34.8% were non-families. 33.4% of all households were made up of individuals, and 16.7% had someone living alone who was 65 years of age or older. The average household size was 2.33 and the average family size was 2.95.

In the town, the population was spread out, with 25.3% under the age of 18, 9.7% from 18 to 24, 26.0% from 25 to 44, 23.1% from 45 to 64, and 15.9% who were 65 years of age or older. The median age was 37 years. For every 100 females, there were 86.7 males. For every 100 females age 18 and over, there were 82.5 males.

The median income for a household in the town was $20,405, and the median income for a family was $25,221. Males had a median income of $26,842 versus $18,864 for females. The per capita income for the town was $11,782. About 28.0% of families and 29.6% of the population were below the poverty line, including 41.0% of those under age 18 and 16.2% of those age 65 or over.

== Education ==
Prior to the 2011 school year the Appalachia High School Bulldogs was merged with the Powell Valley High School Vikings in neighboring Big Stone Gap to become the Union High School Bears. In May 2017, Appalachia Elementary School was formally closed.

== Special events ==
Each year, usually in the first week of August, the residents of Appalachia and the surrounding area celebrate their heritage in a week-long celebration known as Coal/Railroad Days. The festival includes a 5K road race, music concerts at the town's amphitheater, amusement rides, street vendors, a parade, and numerous other festival type events. Twice, Coal/Railroad days has coincided with other celebrations in Appalachia. In 2000 the town took part in a mass high school reunion, known as Appy 2000. In 2006, the festival was part of the Appalachia 100 celebration that marked the 100th birthday of the Town of Appalachia.

== World records ==
The town of Appalachia holds two world records.

- Bee Rock Tunnel, the world's second-shortest railroad tunnel.
- The Peake Building, an apartment house with street-level access on all four floors.
