= National Register of Historic Places listings in Wise County, Virginia =

Location of Wise County in Virginia

This is a list of the National Register of Historic Places listings in Wise County, Virginia.

This is intended to be a complete list of the properties and districts on the National Register of Historic Places in Wise County, Virginia, United States. The locations of National Register properties and districts for which the latitude and longitude coordinates are included below, may be seen in an online map.

There are 21 properties and districts listed on the National Register in the county.

This National Park Service list is complete through NPS recent listings posted May 1, 2026.

== Current listings ==
	Name on the Register	Image	Date listed	Location	City or town	Description
1	Appalachia Commercial Historic District	Appalachia Commercial Historic District	August 6, 2019 (#100004258)	Along W. Main St., Kentucky Ave., and Powell St. 36°54′16″N 82°47′02″W	Appalachia	
2	Big Stone Gap Downtown Historic District	Big Stone Gap Downtown Historic District	March 13, 2019 (#100003482)	200-500 Wood Ave., E. Shawnee Ave., E. 3rd St., E. 4th St., and E. 5th St. 36°52′00″N 82°46′32″W	Big Stone Gap	
3	James A. Bland High School		November 7, 2024 (#100010995)	505 E. 5th Street South; 36°51′46″N 82°46′16″W	Big Stone Gap	
4	Christ Episcopal Church	Christ Episcopal Church	December 19, 1990 (#89001905)	100 Clinton Ave. 36°51′51″N 82°46′36″W	Big Stone Gap	
5	Colonial Hotel	Colonial Hotel	February 5, 1991 (#91000019)	Junction of Main and Spring Sts. 36°58′39″N 82°34′49″W	Wise	
6	Country Cabin	Country Cabin	October 27, 1992 (#92001395)	Junction of Old U.S. Route 23 and Norton Rd. 36°55′35″N 82°40′24″W	Norton	
7	Derby Historic District	Derby Historic District	January 16, 2004 (#03001436)	Derby Rd. from a point beginning 1 mile (1.6 km) above the junction with State Route 78 and extending for 1.2 miles (1.9 km) to the northwest 36°56′05″N 82°49′21″W	Appalachia	
8	Flat Gap High School	Flat Gap High School	March 6, 2009 (#09000123)	North Fork Rd. 37°05′00″N 82°41′36″W	Pound	
9	John Fox, Jr. House	John Fox, Jr. House	June 7, 1974 (#74002151)	117 Shawnee Ave. 36°51′58″N 82°46′42″W	Big Stone Gap	
10	E. M. Fulton House	E. M. Fulton House	February 1, 2006 (#05001581)	103 W. Main St. 36°58′41″N 82°34′50″W	Wise	
11	Kelly View School	Kelly View School	August 30, 2006 (#06000752)	Appalachia Elementary School, Old U.S. Route 23. 36°55′33″N 82°44′38″W	Appalachia	
12	St. Paul Historic District	St. Paul Historic District	June 8, 2011 (#11000351)	Portions of 4th and 5th Aves. and Russell and Broad Sts. 36°54′19″N 82°18′38″W	St. Paul	
13	Southwest Virginia Museum Historical State Park	Southwest Virginia Museum Historical State Park	November 22, 2002 (#02001362)	10 W. 1st St., N. 36°51′49″N 82°46′48″W	Big Stone Gap	
14	Stonega Historic District	Stonega Historic District	January 16, 2004 (#03001435)	Stonega Rd. from 0.1 mi. north of the junction with Roda Rd. to a point approximately 3 mi. to the northeast 36°57′12″N 82°47′22″W	Appalachia	
15	Sunnydale Farm	Sunnydale Farm	June 8, 2011 (#11000352)	12439 Sunnydale Farm Rd. 37°09′20″N 82°33′33″W	Pound	
16	Tacoma School	Tacoma School	September 12, 1997 (#97001072)	4408 Stone Mountain Rd. 36°56′06″N 82°31′55″W	Coeburn	
17	Terrace Park Girl Scout Cabin	Terrace Park Girl Scout Cabin	November 1, 2007 (#07001146)	211 Proctor St., N. 36°51′56″N 82°46′52″W	Big Stone Gap	
18	"June Tolliver" House	"June Tolliver" House	August 28, 1973 (#73002067)	522 Clinton Ave., E. 36°52′02″N 82°46′22″W	Big Stone Gap	
19	U.S. Post Office and Courthouse	U.S. Post Office and Courthouse	December 23, 1975 (#75002043)	322 Wood Ave., E. 36°52′01″N 82°46′30″W	Big Stone Gap	
20	Virginia City Church	Virginia City Church	November 16, 2005 (#05001263)	Bull Run Rd. 36°55′06″N 82°20′49″W	St. Paul	
21	Wise County Courthouse	Wise County Courthouse	March 2, 1981 (#81000649)	206 E. Main St. 36°58′37″N 82°34′46″W	Wise	

== See also ==
- List of National Historic Landmarks in Virginia
- National Register of Historic Places listings in Virginia
