= Virginia State Route 78 =

State highway in Wise County, Virginia, US

State Route 78

Route information
- Maintained by VDOT
- Length: 3.85 mi (6.20 km)
- Existed: 1946–present

Major junctions
- South end: US 23 Bus. in Appalachia
- North end: SR 600 near Stonega

Location
- Country: United States
- State: Virginia
- Counties: Wise

Highway system
- Virginia Routes; Interstate; US; Primary; Secondary; Byways; History; HOT lanes
| ← I-77 | → SR 79 |

State Route 78 (SR 78) is a primary state highway in the U.S. state of Virginia. The state highway runs 3.85 miles (6.20 km) from U.S. Route 23 Business (US 23 Business) north to SR 600 at Stonega. SR 78 connects Appalachian with several coal mining communities in western Wise County. The state highway became a primary state highway, SR 62, in the early 1940s. SR 78 received its present number in the mid-1940s when current SR 62 received its designation.

== Route description ==
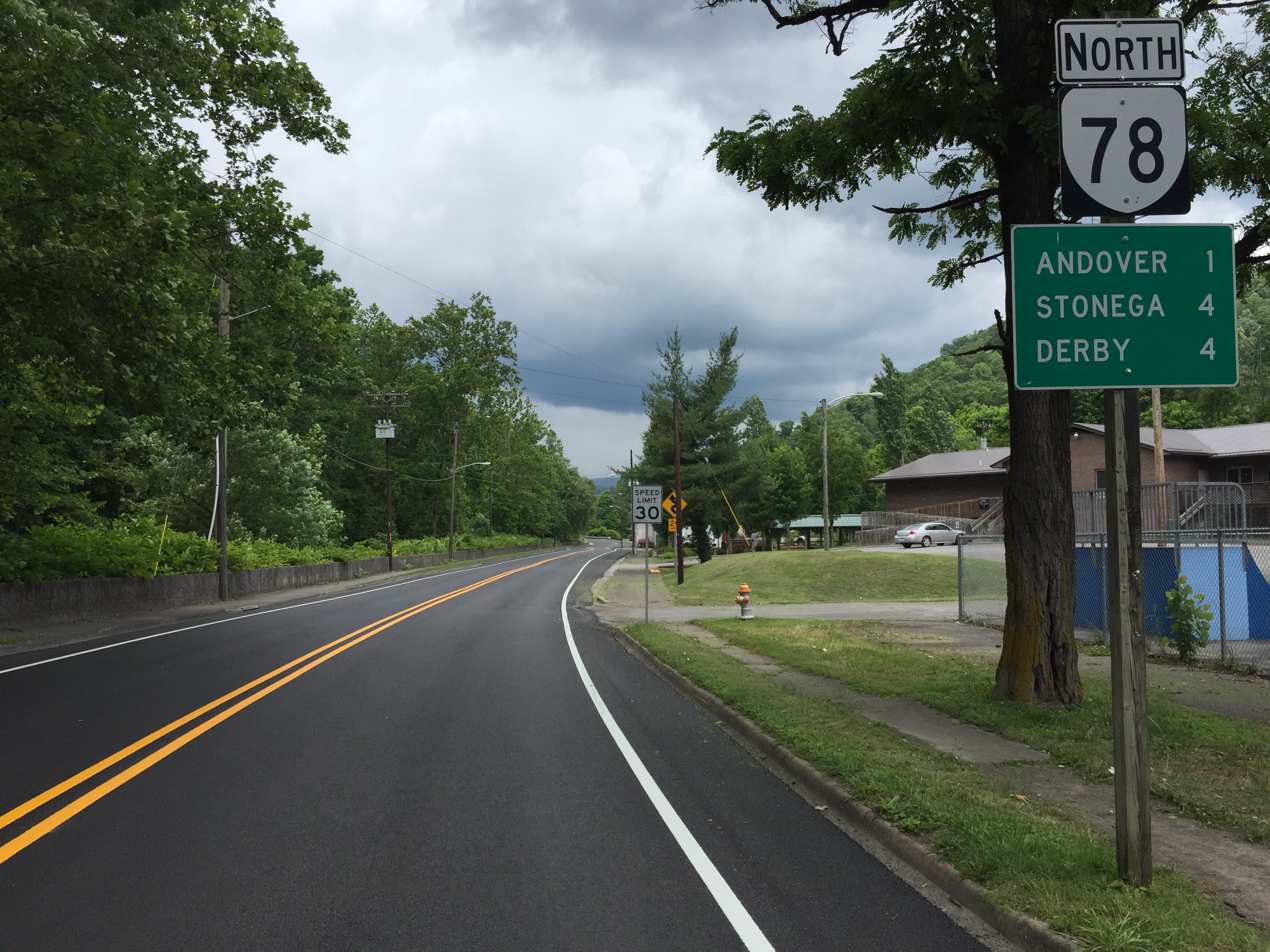
View north along SR 78 north of US 23 Bus. in Appalachia

SR 78 begins at an intersection with US 23 Business (Main Street) in the town of Appalachia. The state highway heads east and immediately turns north onto the old alignment of Main Street, which parallels US 23 Business. SR 78 crosses Callahan Creek and curves northwest onto Callahan Avenue to pass under US 23 Business, which crosses over the creek, the state highway, and a Norfolk Southern Railway spur line, formerly part of the Interstate Railroad, on a sweeping bridge. SR 78 parallels the creek and rail spur out of the town of Appalachia as Stonega Road and through the hamlet of Andover, where the highway passes a rail yard. The state highway intersects several auxiliary rail spurs on its way to the hamlet of Stonega. SR 78 reaches its northern terminus at an arbitrary spot south of the clusters of houses that form Stonega. The road continues north as SR 600 to a dead end at a coal mine.

== History ==
All of SR 78 outside Appalachia was numbered SR 600 in the 1930s. In 1942, the present length of SR 78 was transferred to the primary system as State Route 62. The current SR 62 was added in 1946 to match North Carolina Highway 62, and at that time SR 62 was renumbered SR 78.

== Major intersections ==
The entire route is in Wise County.

| Location | mi | km | Destinations | Notes |
|---|---|---|---|---|
| Appalachia | 0.00 | 0.00 | US 23 Bus. (Main Street) – Jonesville, Norton | Southern terminus |
| | 3.85 | 6.20 | SR 600 (Stonega Road) – Stonega | Northern terminus |
1.000 mi = 1.609 km; 1.000 km = 0.621 mi
