= Dock Boggs =

American singer-songwriter

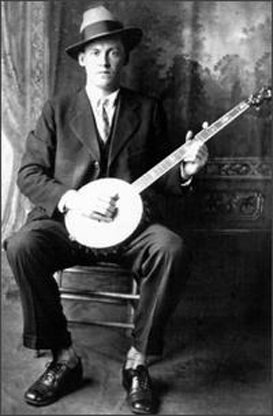

Background information
- Born: Moran Lee Boggs; February 7, 1898; Norton, Virginia, U.S.
- Died: February 7, 1971 (aged 73) Needmore, Virginia, U.S.
- Genres: Old-time
- Instrument: Banjo
- Years active: c. 1927–1929, 1963–1971
- Labels: Brunswick; Lonesome Ace; Folkways

Moran Lee "Dock" Boggs (February 7, 1898 – February 7, 1971) was an American old-time singer, songwriter, and banjo player. His style of banjo playing, as well as his singing, is considered a unique combination of Appalachian folk music and African-American blues. Contemporary folk musicians and performers consider him a seminal figure, at least in part because of the appearance of two of his recordings from the 1920s, "Sugar Baby" and "Country Blues", on Harry Smith's 1952 collection Anthology of American Folk Music. Boggs was first recorded in 1927 and again in 1929. He worked primarily as a coal miner for most of his life.

He was rediscovered during the folk music revival of the 1960s and spent much of his later life playing at folk music festivals and recording for Folkways Records.

== Biography ==
=== Early life ===
Boggs was born in West Norton, Virginia, in 1898, the youngest of ten children. In the late 1890s, the arrival of railroads in central Appalachia brought large-scale coal mining to the region, and by the time Dock was born, the Boggs family had made the transition from subsistence farming to working for wages and living in mining towns. Dock's father, who worked as a carpenter and blacksmith, loved singing and could read sheet music. He taught his children to sing, and several of Dock's siblings learned to play the banjo.

In an interview with Mike Seeger in the 1960s, Boggs recalled how, as a young child, he would follow an African-American guitarist named "Go Lightning" up and down the railroad tracks between Norton and Dorchester, hoping the guitarist would stop at street corners to play for change.

Boggs's version of the ballad "John Henry" was based in part on the version he learned from Go Lightning during this period. He also recalled sneaking over to the African-American camps in Dorchester at night, where he first observed string bands playing at dances and parties. He was enamoured of the bands' banjo players' preference for picking, having previously been exposed only to the "frailing" style of his siblings.

Around the time he began working in coal mines, Boggs began playing music more often and more seriously. He learned much of his technique during this period from his brother Roscoe and an itinerant musician named Homer Crawford, both of whom shared Dock's preference for picking. Crawford taught him "Hustlin' Gambler," which was the basis for Boggs's "Country Blues." He also picked up several songs (such as "Turkey in the Straw") from a local African-American musician named Jim White. Boggs probably began playing at parties around 1918.

=== Early career, 1927–1931 ===
In the mid-1920s, various record companies sent representatives to southern Appalachia to hold auditions in hopes of finding new talents. Around late 1926 or early 1927, Boggs tried out at one such audition, held by Brunswick Records at the Norton Hotel. Although he played on a banjo borrowed from a local music store and needed whiskey to calm his nerves, he played well enough to gain a contract to record several sides in New York later that year. He recorded only eight sides for Brunswick, however, as he deemed their payment sufficient for only that number.

Boggs's records sold moderately well, and he returned to the mining areas of southwestern Virginia and eastern Kentucky, where he began to play at parties, gatherings, and mining camps. Around this time, his brother-in-law Lee Hansucker, who was a Holiness preacher and singer, began teaching him religious songs from the Holiness and Baptist traditions. Boggs also learned a large number of songs from listening to Hansucker's vast record collection. By 1928, he was making enough money to quit working in coal mines and focus exclusively on music. He bought a new banjo and formed a band known as "Dock Boggs and His Cumberland Mountain Entertainers". At one point, he was earning three to four hundred dollars a week.

While Dock was experiencing a moderate amount of success, the life of a travelling musician often left him at odds with his religious neighbors, who considered such a life sinful. His wife, Sarah, whom he had married in 1918, despised secular music and was opposed to his earning a living by playing music. The constantly moving mining camps were fraught with excess and violence, and Boggs was consistently engaging in drunken brawls that often left him or an opponent badly injured. The stock market crash of 1929 and the subsequent Great Depression hit southern Appalachia particularly hard, and few people had the means to pay musicians to play at gatherings or buy records.

In 1929, Boggs travelled to Chicago to record four sides for Lonesome Ace Records. However, with the onset of the Great Depression, he was unable to profit from these recordings. In 1930, he travelled to Atlanta, where OKeh Records had set up a live audition on radio station WSB. Because of stage fright, however, he performed poorly. He was offered several other recording auditions over the next three years, but he could not raise enough money to cover his travel expenses. He eventually pawned his banjo and gave up hopes of making a living playing music.

=== Rediscovery ===
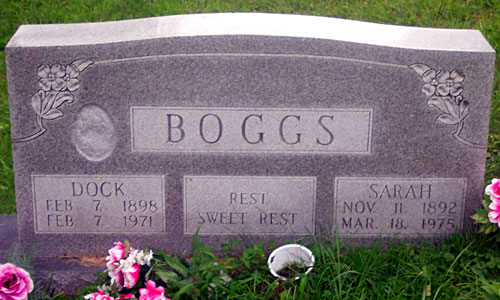
Boggs is buried with his wife, Sarah

In June 1963, at the height of the folk music revival in the United States, the folk music scholar Mike Seeger sought out and found Boggs at his home near Needmore, Virginia. Seeger was delighted to learn that Boggs had recently repurchased a banjo and had been practicing the instrument for several months before his arrival. He persuaded Boggs to play at the American Folk Festival in Asheville, North Carolina, later that year. With Seeger's help, Boggs began recording again, eventually recording three albums for Folkways Records. Throughout the 1960s, he toured the United States, playing in clubs and at folk music festivals, including a performance before an audience of 10,000 at the Newport Folk Festival.

In the early 1970s, Boggs's health began to deteriorate, and he died on his 73rd birthday. In 1968, his protégé Jack Wright started the Dock Boggs Festival, which is still held annually in Boggs's hometown of Norton, although it is now known as the Dock Boggs & Kate Peters Sturgill Festival.

He was buried in Norton, Virginia.

== Technique ==
While Boggs was familiar with the clawhammer style, or "frailing", he typically played in a style known as up-picking, which involves picking upwards on the first two strings and playing one of the other three strings with the thumb. He played several songs in a lower D-modal tuning. His technique, which Seeger considered "a style possessed by no other recorded player," was adapted to fit previously unaccompanied mountain ballads.

Boggs learned traditional mountain songs from his siblings, including, "Sugar Baby," from his brother John; "Danville Girl," which he learned from his brother Roscoe; and "Little Omie Wise," which he learned from his sisters. Lee Hansucker, his brother-in-law, taught him various religious songs, including "O Death", "Little Black Train", "Prodigal Son", and "Calvary". Along with "Turkey in the Straw" and "John Henry", he learned songs such as "Banjo Clog" and "Down South Blues" from African-American blues musicians. The song "Wise County Jail", written by Boggs in 1928, was inspired by an incident in which he had to flee to Kentucky, after attacking a lawman who tried to break up a party at which he was playing.
