= Guest River =

Coordinates: 36°52′34″N 82°30′1″W

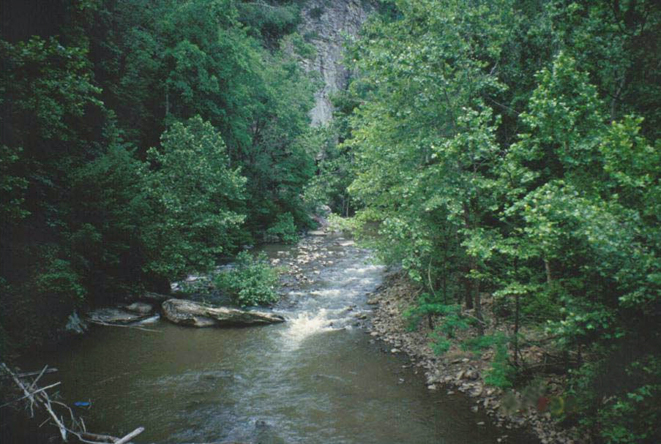
The Guest River

The Guest River is a short tributary of the Clinch River in southwestern Virginia in the United States. It is part of the watershed of the Mississippi River by way of the Clinch, Tennessee and Ohio Rivers. According to the Geographic Names Information System, the river has also been known historically as the Guests River.

== Course ==
The Guest River flows for nearly its entire length in Wise County. It rises in the north-central part of the county and flows initially south-southeastwardly to the city of Norton; then eastwardly to the town of Coeburn; then southeastwardly for the remainder of its course. It flows into the Clinch on the common boundary of Wise and Scott Counties. Portions of the river flow through the Jefferson National Forest. The Guest River's lower course below Coeburn is paralleled by the Guest River Gorge Trail, formerly the Interstate Railroad. The section of river which runs along the Guest River Trail contains multiple class 4 and 5 rapids.

== See also ==
- List of Virginia rivers
