= WGCK =

WGCK may refer to:

- WGCK-FM, a radio station (99.7 FM) licensed to serve Coeburn, Virginia, United States
- WNKW, a radio station (1480 AM) licensed to serve Neon, Kentucky, United States, which held the call sign WGCK from 2009 to 2011
