= Kate Peters Sturgill =

- Born: March 3, 1907
- Died: June 19, 1975 (aged 68)

Katherine O'Neill Peters Sturgill (March 3, 1907 – June 19, 1975) was an Appalachian singer and musician. She collected folk songs and some of her own songs were collected and are in the collections of the Library of Congress.

== Early life ==
Kate Peters Sturgill was born on March 3, 1907, in Wise County, Virginia. One of thirteen children, she took to music early, playing parlor organ by age seven and mastering the guitar as a teenager. In her teens, she married coal miner Sidney Peters. In 1927, she and some neighbors formed the string band Lonesome Pine Trailers.

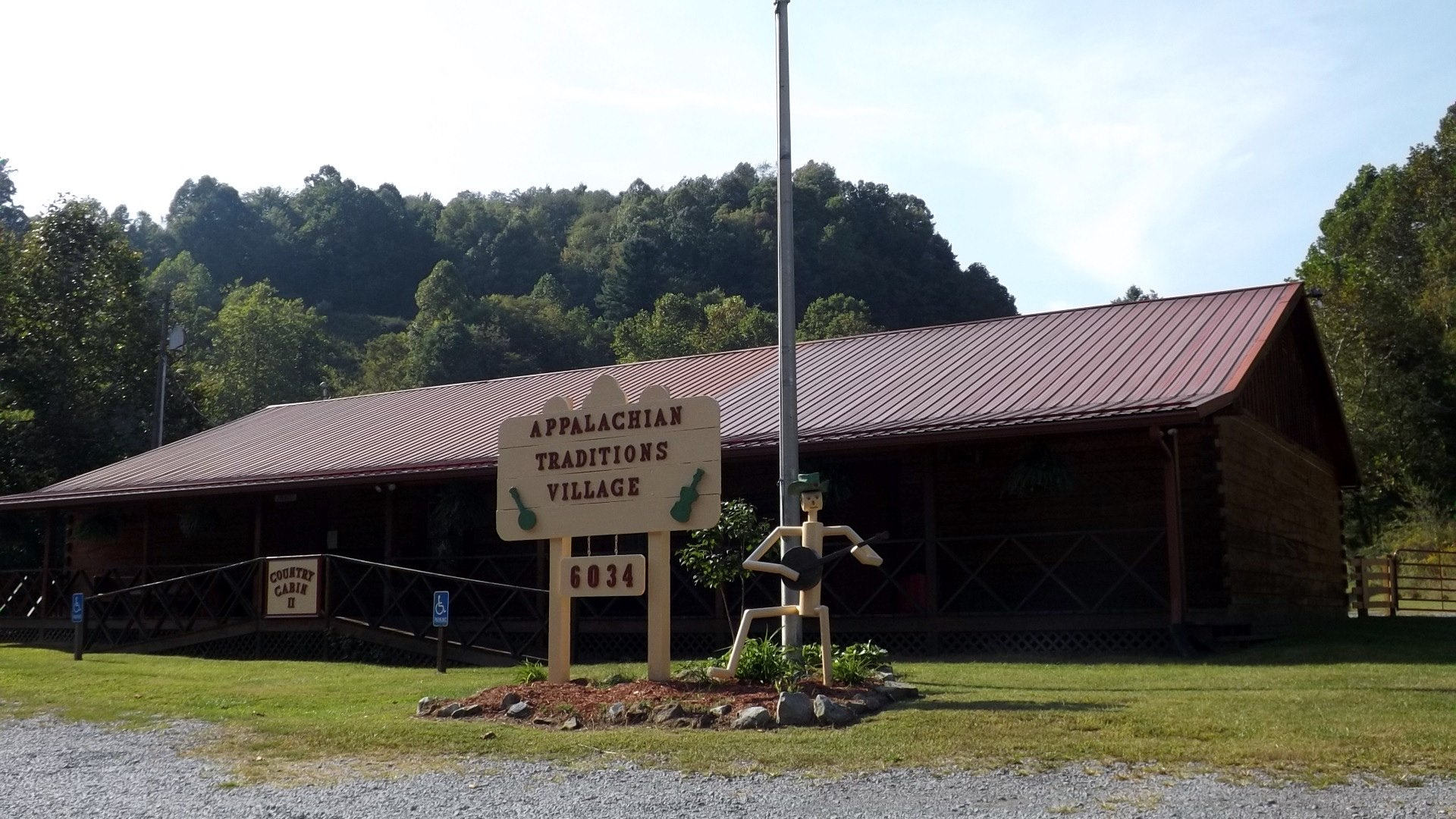
Country Cabin II

In 1937, the Works Progress Administration (WPA) funded the construction of the Country Cabin on the Powell River near Norton, Virginia. It served as a community gathering place where she and her sisters taught traditional music, performance, and crafts, and served meals to impoverished schoolchildren. While the original Cabin fell into disuse over the years, it was resurrected in 1978 as Country Cabin II and is now on the National Register of Historic Places.

She went on folk song collecting trips with A. P. Carter of the famous Carter Family. Appalachian scholar Jack Wright described their process: "She was a distant cousin of A.P. Carter's, and when A.P. went on his song-finding missions, she would often go with him because he couldn't remember tunes as well as she could, and he didn't play guitar so well. She would learn the chords of the songs, and then he would write the songs down." She herself was recorded by Herbert Halpert of the WPA in 1939, credited as Mrs. Kate Peters.

From 1947 to 1954, she and Meadie Moles performed a biweekly show as the Cumberland Valley Girls on WNVA radio. From 1948 to 1951, she was recorded by Tennessee's Folk-Star Records. In 1968, she was recorded by folk song collector Mike Seeger, brother of musician Pete Seeger.

After the death of Sidney Peters, she married another coal miner, Archie Sturgill.

== Death and legacy ==
Kate Peters Sturgill died on June 19, 1975.

Sturgill is celebrated at the annual Dock Boggs and Kate Peters Sturgill Memorial Festival, which was started by Jack Wright at Clinch Valley College in 1969.
