= Big Stone Gap East, Virginia =

- Census-designated place
- Location within Virginia Location within the United States
- Coordinates: 36°52′56″N 82°44′36″W
- Country: United States
- State: Virginia
- County: Wise

Area
  - Total: 0.48 sq mi (1.24 km^{2})
  - Land: 0.48 sq mi (1.24 km^{2})
  - Water: 0 sq mi (0.0 km^{2})
- Elevation: 1,540 ft (470 m)

Population (2020)
  - Total: 687
- Time zone: UTC-5 (Eastern (EST))
  - Summer (DST): UTC-4 (EDT)
- ZIP Code: 24219 (Big Stone Gap)
- Area code: 276
- FIPS code: 51-07484
- GNIS feature ID: 2807471

Big Stone Gap East is an unincorporated area and census-designated place (CDP) in Wise County, Virginia, United States. It was first listed as a CDP in the 2020 census with a population of 687.

The CDP is located in the southwestern part of the county, on the eastern edge of the town of Big Stone Gap, outside the town limits. U.S. Route 23 and 58 Alternate, a four-lane expressway, curves to the south and east of the community, separating it from East Stone Gap to the south. Norton is 8 miles (13 km) to the northeast.

== Demographics ==
Big Stone Gap East first appeared as a census designated place in the 2020 U.S. census.
