= Stonega, Virginia =

- Census-designated place
- Location within Virginia Location within the United States
- Coordinates: 36°57′11″N 82°47′29″W
- Country: United States
- State: Virginia
- County: Wise
- Founded: July 15, 1895

Area
  - Total: 0.622 sq mi (1.61 km^{2})
  - Land: 0.622 sq mi (1.61 km^{2})
  - Water: 0 sq mi (0 km^{2})
- Elevation: 1,818 ft (554 m)

Population (2020)
  - Total: 93
  - Density: 149.5/sq mi (57.7/km^{2})
- Time zone: UTC−5 (Eastern (EST))
  - Summer (DST): UTC−4 (EDT)
- ZIP codes: 24285
- GNIS feature ID: 1487603

Stonega is a Census-designated place and coal town located in Wise County, Virginia, United States. As of the 2020 census, Stonega had a population of 93. It is part of the Big Stone Gap, Virginia micropolitan area. The community was founded in 1895 to provide housing and coking facilities for the Virginia Coal and Iron Company before being leased to the Stonega Coke and Coal Company in 1902. The community was owned and operated as a company town until after World War II. Their post office closed in 2002.

== History ==
Stonega was founded by J.K. Taggart in 1895 as "Pioneer," a name chosen because it was the first commercial mine and coking plant in Wise County. The name was changed in 1896 to reflect the town's proximity to Stone Gap, a pass through the mountains between Virginia and Kentucky. That same year, Taggart was killed during a mining accident. The town was owned and maintained by the Virginia Coal and Iron Company until 1902, when the Stonega Coke and Coal Company assumed control of the operation and leased the land. There were no major strikes at Stonega or the surrounding camps until 1937.

"After being slowed by the depression of 1893, Virginia Coal and Iron Company began building Pioneer, its first and model Coal town, in 1895, around the mine opening at the headwaters of Callahan Creek. Built using local timber, Pioneer straddled the flat bottom land of the creek between Bluff Spur and Nine Mile Spur Mountains, which offered narrow, winding land on which to construct the upper coke ovens, railroad tracks, homes and service buildings needed by such a remote community. By 1896, the new colliery or coal mine opened and was renamed Stonega, a contraction of Stone and Gap. The company owned Interstate Railroad connected the mine with the Louisville and Nashville Railroad, six miles away at Appalachia, Virginia."

== Demographics ==
Stonega first appeared as a census designated place in the 2020 U.S. census.
