= Toms Creek, Virginia =

- Unincorporated community
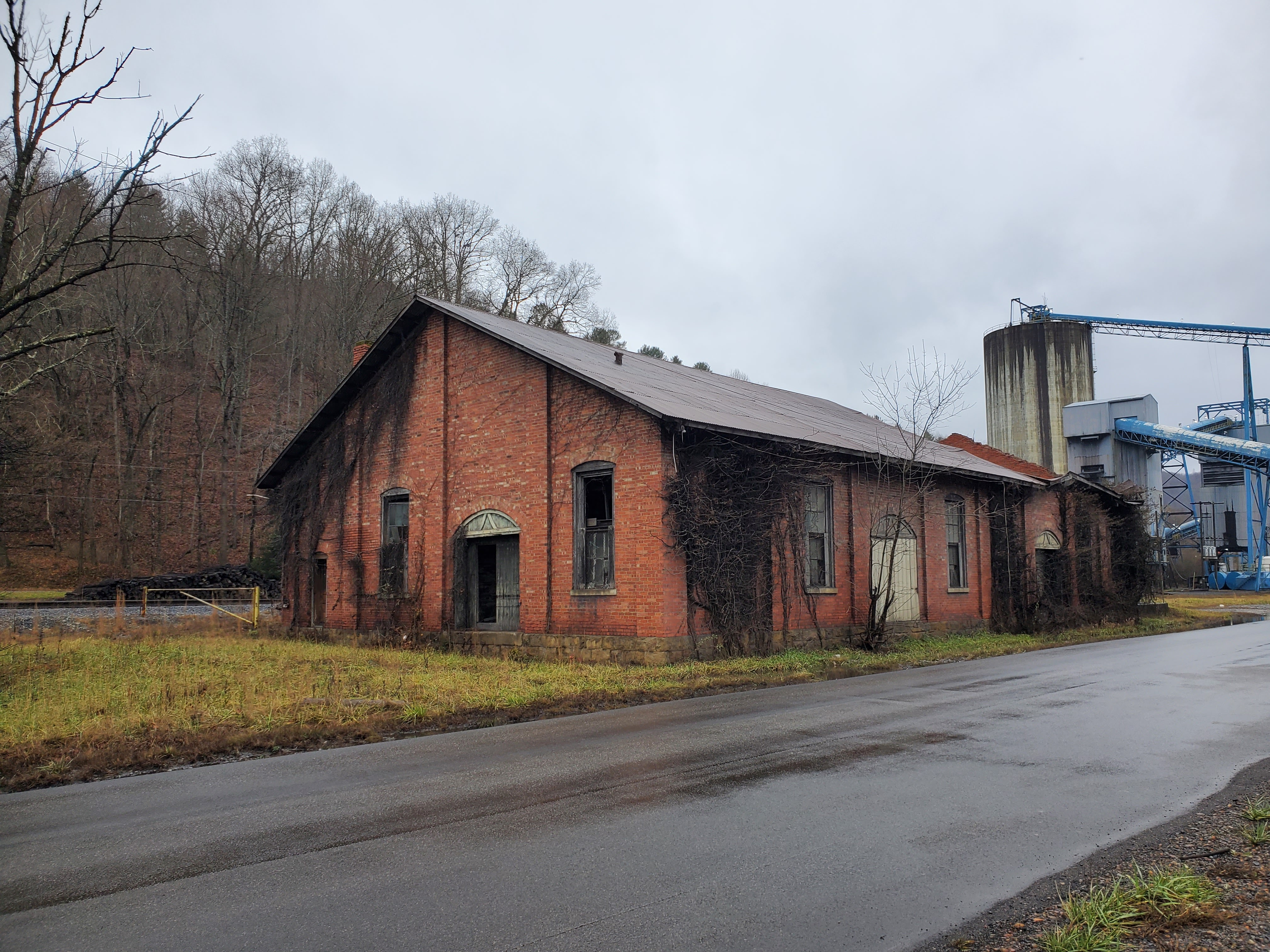
- A building in Tom's Creek

- Location within Virginia Location within the United States
- Coordinates: 36°58′00″N 82°27′17″W
- Country: United States
- State: Virginia
- County: Wise
- Elevation: 2,028 ft (618 m)
- Time zone: UTC−5 (Eastern (EST))
  - Summer (DST): UTC−4 (EDT)
- GNIS feature ID: 1493714

Toms Creek is an unincorporated community and coal town located in Wise County, Virginia, United States.
