= Lipps, Virginia =

- Unincorporated community
- Location within Virginia Location within the United States
- Coordinates: 37°00′15″N 82°39′5″W
- Country: United States
- State: Virginia
- County: Wise
- Elevation: 2,333 ft (711 m)
- Time zone: UTC-5 (Eastern (EST))
  - Summer (DST): UTC-4 (EDT)
- GNIS feature ID: 1484862

Lipps is an unincorporated community in Wise County, Virginia, United States.
