= Cracker Neck, Virginia =

- Unincorporated community
- Location within Virginia Location within the United States
- Coordinates: 36°50′48″N 82°42′33″W
- Country: United States
- State: Virginia
- County: Wise
- Elevation: 1,680 ft (510 m)
- Time zone: UTC-5 (Eastern (EST))
  - Summer (DST): UTC-4 (EDT)
- GNIS feature ID: 1494205

Cracker Neck is an unincorporated community in Wise County, Virginia, United States. It was also called Cracker's Neck.
