= Stonega Historic District =

Historic district in Virginia, United States

- U.S. National Register of Historic Places
- U.S. Historic district
- Virginia Landmarks Register
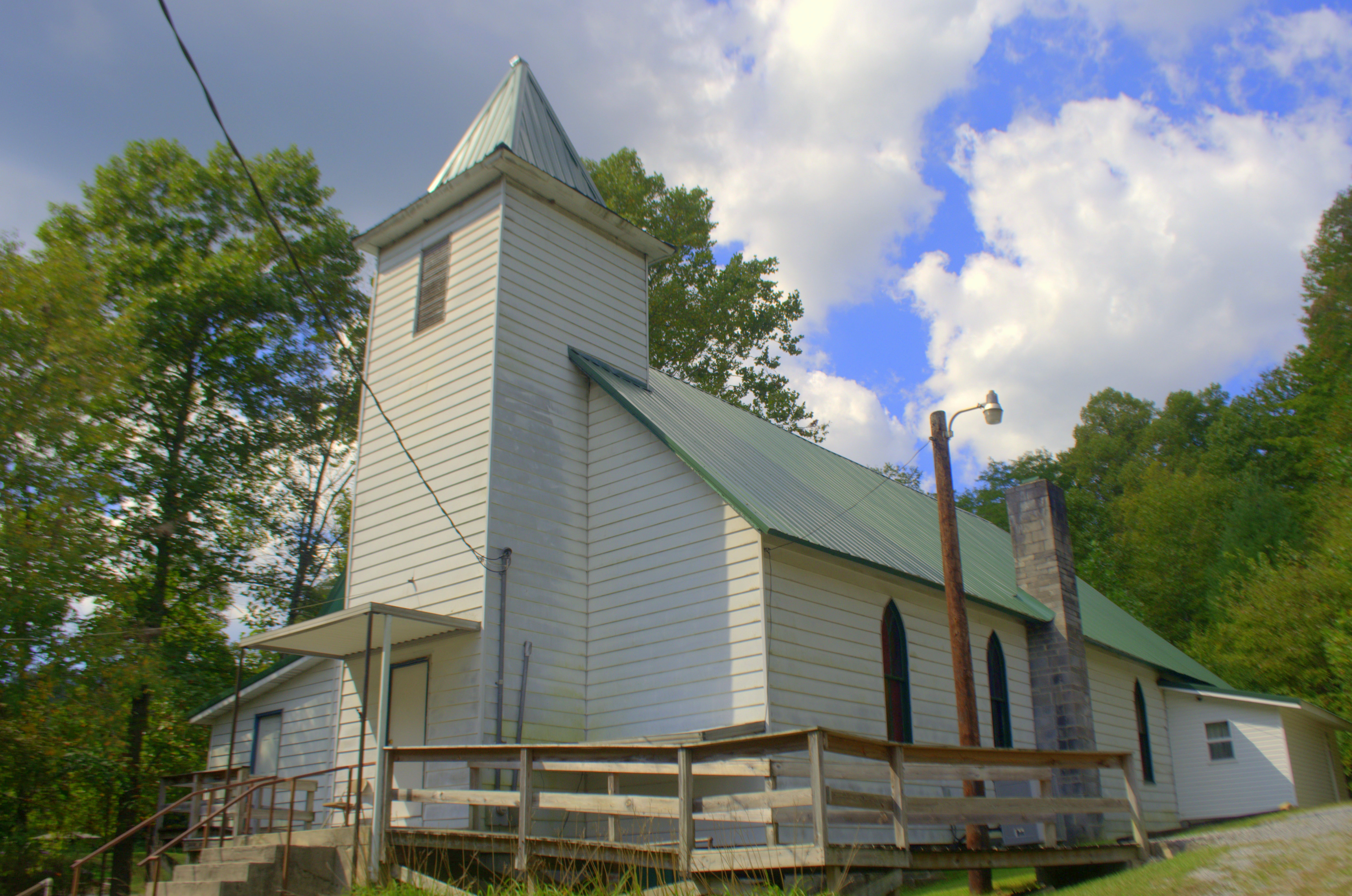
- Stonega Roman Catholic church which became a Baptist church in 1930.

- Location within Virginia Location within the United States
- Location: VA 686, from a point beginning 1 mi. above the jct. with VA 78 and extending for 1.2 mi. to the NW, Appalachia, Virginia
- Coordinates: 36°57′11″N 82°47′29″W
- Area: 105 acres (42 ha)
- Architectural style: Late 19th And 20th Century Revivals, Late 19th And Early 20th Century American Movements
- NRHP reference No.: 03001435
- VLR No.: 097-0042

Significant dates
- Added to NRHP: January 16, 2004
- Designated VLR: September 10, 2003

Stonega Historic District is a national historic district located at Appalachia, Wise County, Virginia. The district encompasses 80 contributing buildings in the coal company town of Stonega. It includes a variety of residential, commercial, institutional, and industrial buildings built after the towns' founding in 1895. Notable buildings include the Catholic Church (c. 1906), Stonega Colored Methodist Church (c. 1906), Stonega Colored School / Community Building, Stonega Bath House (c. 1938), and Stonega Colored School.

Large homes were built for company doctors and less grand but almost as large was a house for the superintendent. Ten, Four and Seven car garages were also built for cars.

It was listed on the National Register of Historic Places in 2004.

== Gallery ==
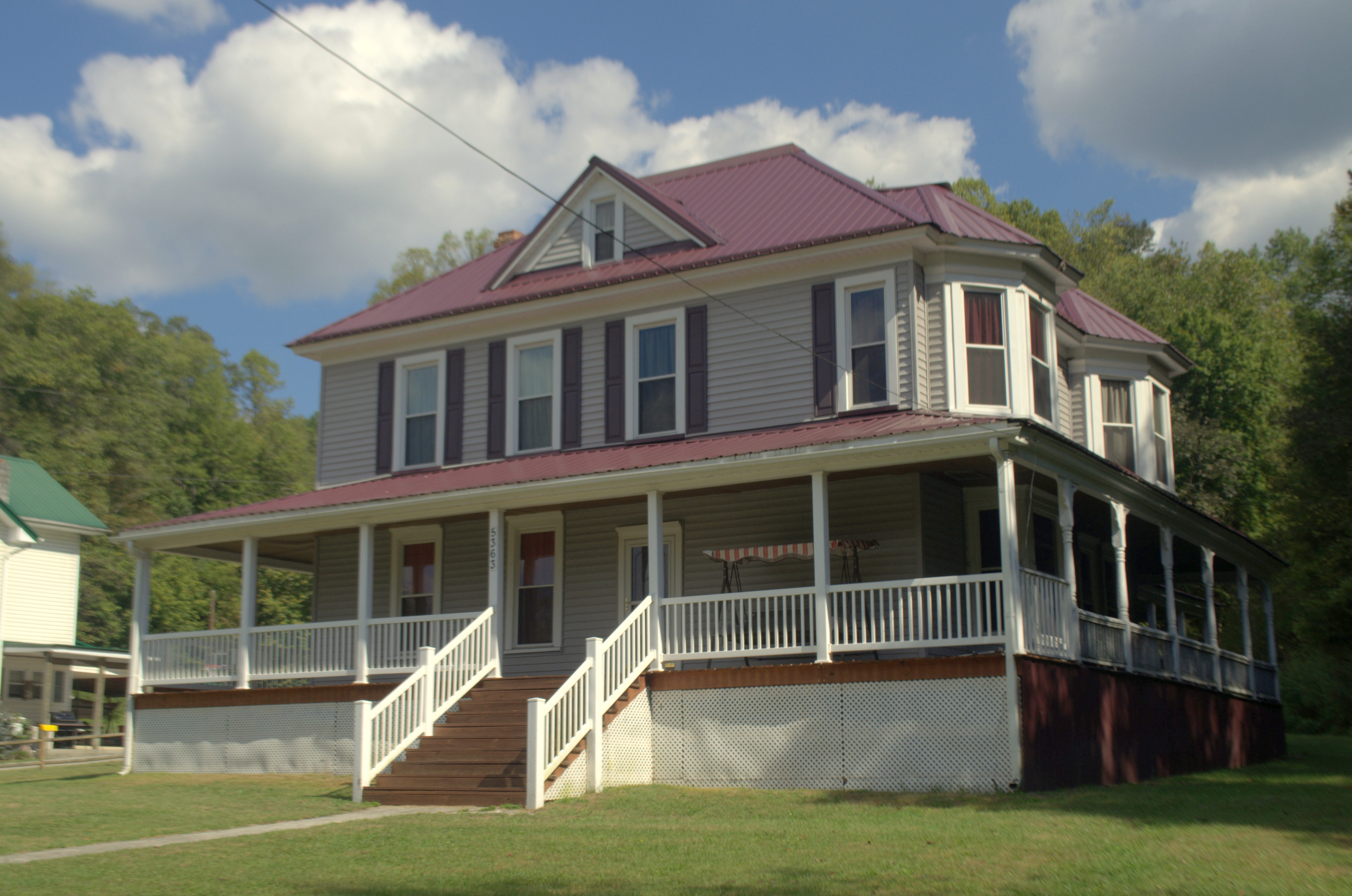
Doctor's Home in the Stonega Historic District. Home for many years of Dr. W.W. Barton, a much-remembered company doctor.

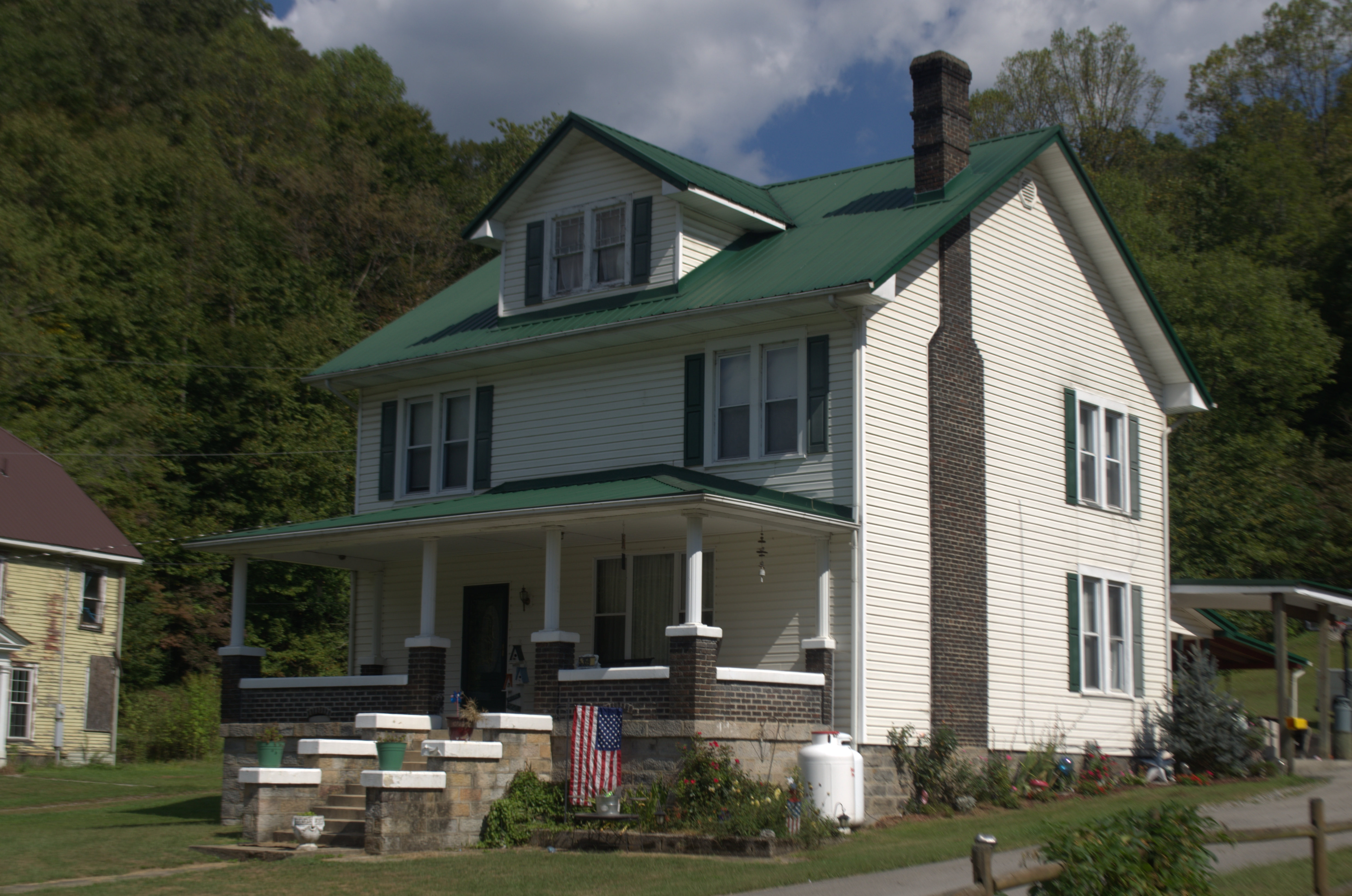
Superintendent's House in the Stonega Historic District.

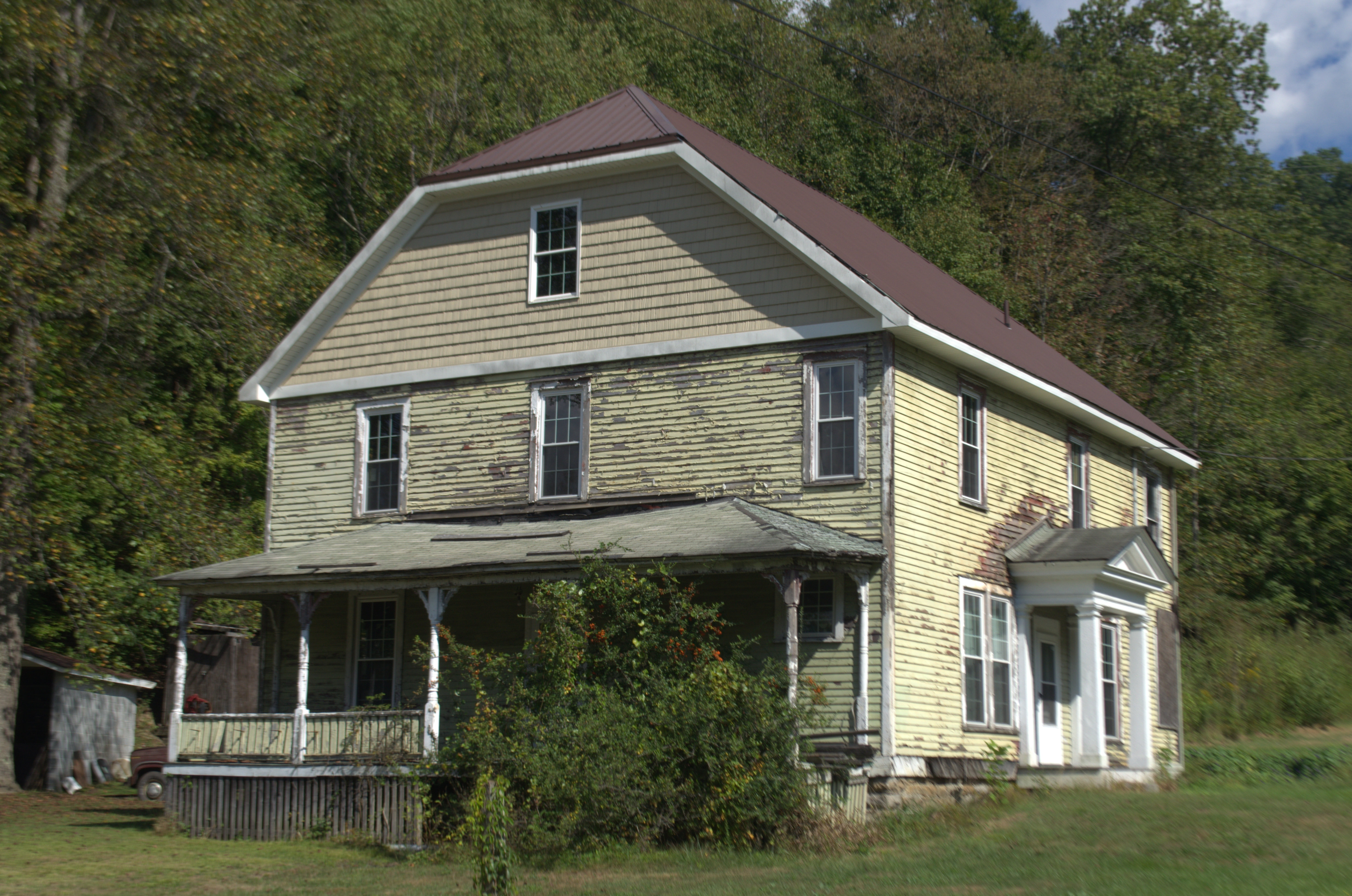
Doctor's Home in the Stonega Historic District. Home of one of the company doctors and the location of the hospital for the community

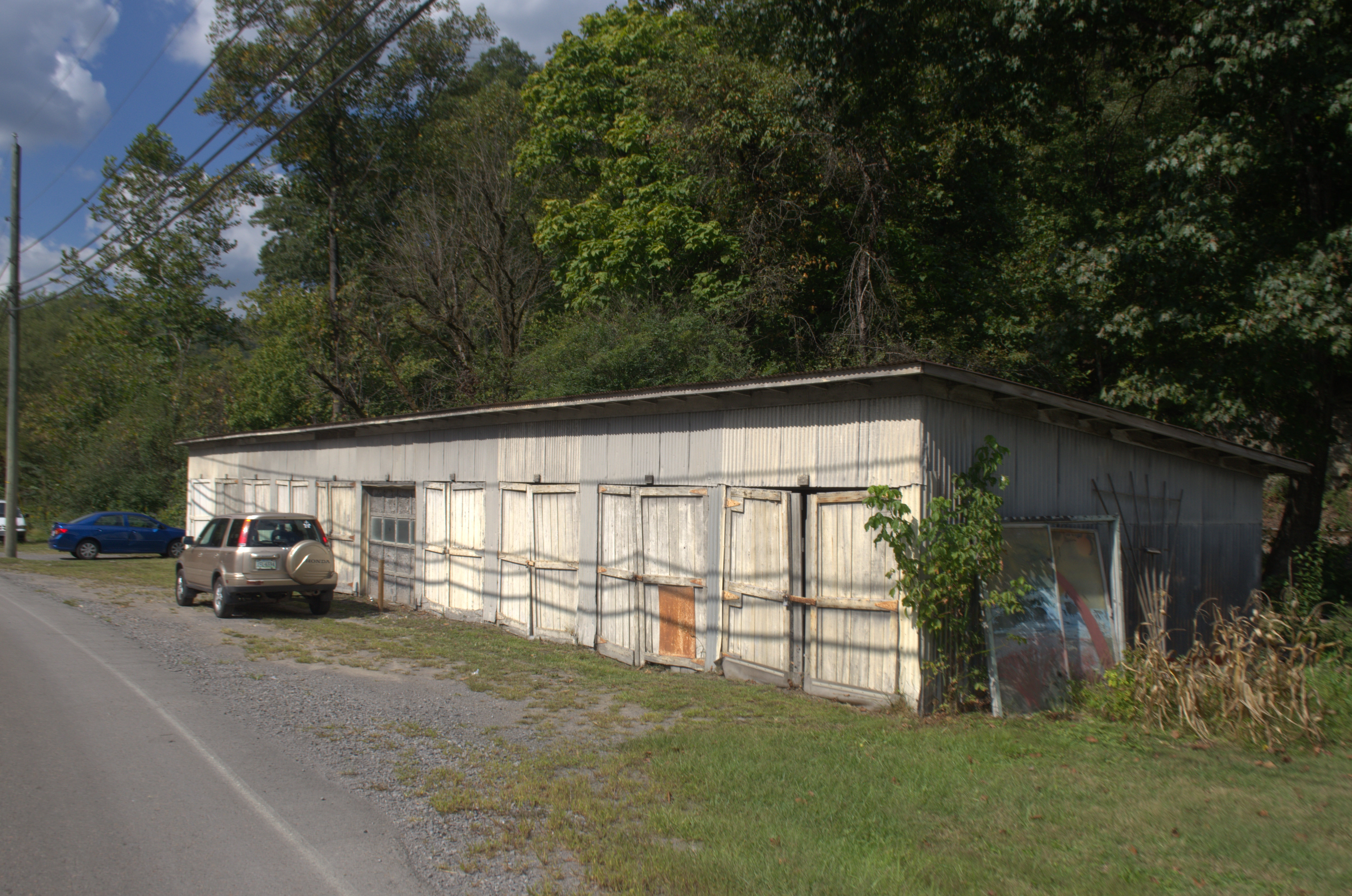
A historic ten car garage in the Stonega Historic District.

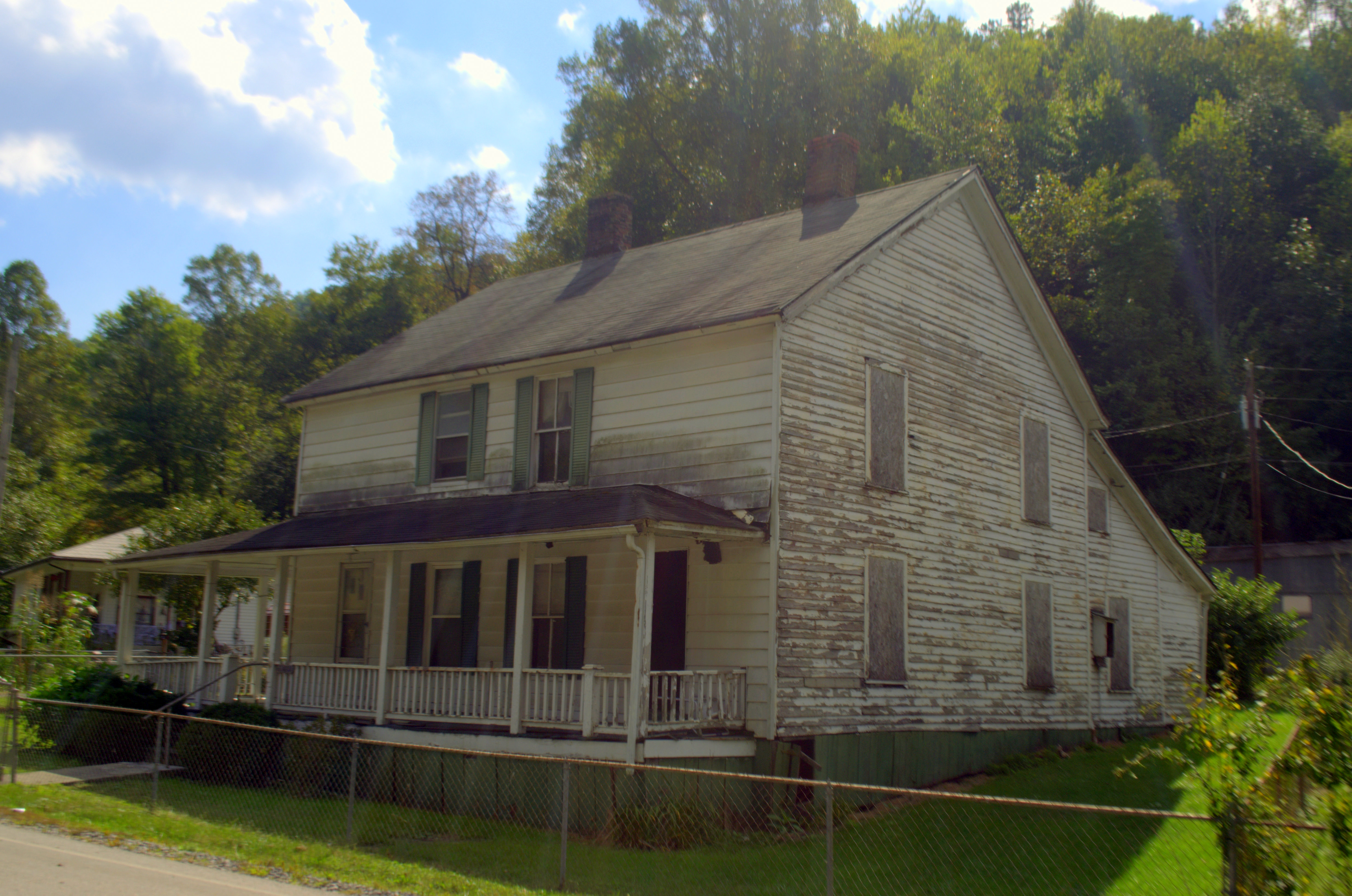
A Multi-family dwelling in the Stonega Historic District that is larger and deeper than the other units.
