= Gilley, Virginia =

- Unincorporated community
- Location within Virginia Location within the United States
- Coordinates: 37°05′57″N 82°40′30″W
- Country: United States
- State: Virginia
- County: Wise
- Elevation: 1,660 ft (510 m)
- Time zone: UTC-5 (Eastern (EST))
  - Summer (DST): UTC-4 (EDT)
- Area code: 276
- GNIS feature ID: 1483631

Gilley is an unincorporated community in Wise County, Virginia, United States.
