= High Knob =

Mountain in Virginia, United States of America

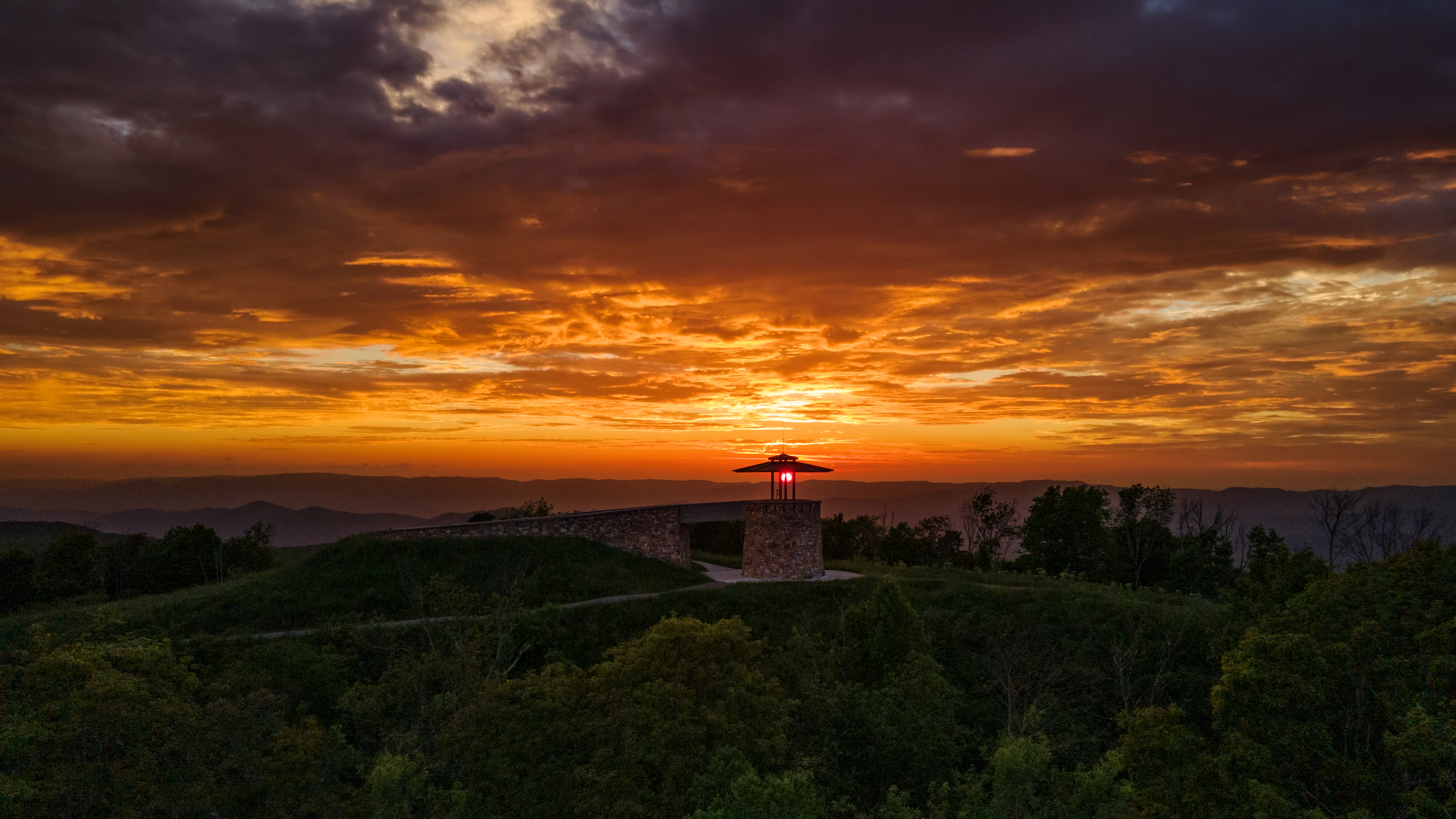
- High Knob Tower

Highest point
- Elevation: 4,223 ft (1,287 m)
- Prominence: 2,043 ft (623 m)
- Coordinates: 36°53′33″N 82°37′47″W

Geography
- Location within Virginia
- Location: Wise County, Virginia, U.S.
- Parent range: Cumberland Mountains
- Topo map: USGS Norton

Climbing
- Easiest route: Hike, or drive from Route 619 to near the summit

High Knob is the peak of Stone Mountain, that forms part of the border between Scott County and Wise County, Virginia, near the city of Norton that rises to 4,223 feet (1,287 meters) above mean sea level.

== Location ==
High Knob is found on the western front range of the Appalachian Mountains, along the mountainous southeastern edge of the Cumberland Plateau of Southwest Virginia. It is unique to Virginia in containing both Appalachian Plateau and Ridge and Valley topography, although it is largely a karstic landform of the Ridge and Valley Province.

High Knob stretches across portions of southern Wise County, northern Scott County, and the northeastern tip of Lee County. It is a significant physical feature in Virginia and is among the widest singular mountains in the southern Appalachians, being locally greater than 13 miles (21 km) wide from base to base and more than 26 miles (42 km) long. It represents the "pivot point" of the Cumberland Mountain Overthrust Block. (first described in notable detail during the 1920s and 1930s by geologists Charles Butts and John Rich).

Although some 1,000 to 1,500 feet (300 to 460 metres) lower in elevation than the Mount Rogers highcountry to the east (Mount Rogers is the highest peak in Virginia), the terrain surrounding the High Knob of Stone Mountain forms a true highcountry with respect to the western slopes of the Appalachians in Virginia (i.e., the Cumberland Mountains).

== Features ==
The area around High Knob is dominant structural feature of the Powell Valley Anticline of the Cumberland Mountain Overthrust Block. With its adjoining faults (Hunter Valley-Clinchport system), this region possesses the greatest concentration of significant caves in Virginia.

The summit of High Knob in particular exerts a significant impact upon the climate of Southwest Virginia and surrounding areas, being one of the rainiest and snowiest locations in both Virginia and the southern Appalachians.

The topography, geography, and orographically forced climate has over time created a landscape that nutures biological diversity.

High Knob unofficially holds the record for the most snow ever measured in Virginia during a single season, with 200.5 inches (509 cm) during the 1995–96 winter.

During a typical year, 60 to 70 inches (150 to 180 centimetres) of total precipitation falls across the area, to make it one of the wettest areas north of the Great Smokies, and the wettest in Virginia for which there are available records. Significant additional moisture contributions occur from fog drip off trees and rime deposition on trees, with many days during the year being spent amid orographic feeder butts that cap its upper elevations.

On a clear day, four other states can be seen from the summit: West Virginia, Tennessee, Kentucky, and North Carolina.

== High Knob Lookout Tower ==
At its peak stood one of the few remaining fire towers of the Appalachian Mountains. Built in 1938–39 by the Civilian Conservation Corps, the original structure was a 14' × 14' wooden house. The replacement lookout, a three-story structure, was built by the Flatwoods Job Corps in 1978–79. High Knob's fire tower is listed in the National Historic Lookout Registry.

On October 31, 2007, the High Knob Lookout Tower was destroyed by arson. The tower was set on fire in the early hours of Halloween morning. By the time the Jefferson Forest Service and local fire departments arrived on scene, the fire tower was fully engulfed in flames, and could not be saved. Firefighters were able to keep the fire from spreading to the rest of the Knob, which was suffering from drought conditions. In 2009 work began in earnest to replace the destroyed tower. A tower replacement project was spearheaded by The High Knob Enhancement Corporation who raised required funding from donations. Under the direction of the USDA, Forest Service, Hill studio architects and Landscape Architects submitted designs and construction documents for the new tower now roughly standing where the lost tower once stood. The tower was built by DOT Construction. The tower was completed on August 22, 2014. The new tower achieves accessibility for physically impaired visitors by conceiving a properly graded and surfaced loop trail that culminates in a bridge crossing which connects the tower with the trail.
