= Bee Rock Tunnel =

Coordinates: 36°53′47.9″N 82°47′19.9″W

Bee Rock Tunnel is a former railroad tunnel that is located in Appalachia, Virginia. It was built in 1891 by the Louisville and Nashville Railroad. The tunnel is part of the Powell River Trail which is now a walking and biking trail located in Appalachia, VA.

Though known locally as the "world's shortest railroad tunnel", at 47 feet 7 inches (14.50 m) long, it is 1 foot 7 inches (0.48 m) longer than the Westmoreland Tunnel, in Westmoreland, Tennessee. Both tunnels, however, are longer than the Backbone Rock Tunnel near Shady Valley, Tennessee, which at around 20 feet (6.1 m) long, is the "world's shortest railroad tunnel."
