= Dunbar, Virginia =

- Census-designated place
- Location within Virginia Location within the United States
- Coordinates: 36°58′26″N 82°44′50″W
- Country: United States
- State: Virginia
- County: Wise

Area
  - Total: 0.023 sq mi (0.06 km^{2})
- Elevation: 1,946 ft (593 m)

Population (2020)
  - Total: 79
  - Density: 3,400/sq mi (1,300/km^{2})
- Time zone: UTC-5 (Eastern (EST))
  - Summer (DST): UTC-4 (EDT)
- GNIS feature ID: 1496881

Dunbar is an unincorporated community, census-designated place and coal town located in Wise County, Virginia, United States. It was first listed as a CDP in the 2020 United States census with a population of 79.

== Demographics ==
Dunbar first appeared as a census designated place in the 2020 United States census.
