= Osaka, Virginia =

- Census-designated place
- Location within Virginia Location within the United States
- Coordinates: 36°56′49″N 82°48′39″W
- Country: United States
- State: Virginia
- County: Wise

Area
  - Total: 0.431 sq mi (1.12 km^{2})
  - Land: 0.431 sq mi (1.12 km^{2})
  - Water: 0 sq mi (0 km^{2})
- Elevation: 1,801 ft (549 m)

Population (2020)
  - Total: 132
  - Density: 306.3/sq mi (118.3/km^{2})
- Time zone: UTC-5 (Eastern (EST))
  - Summer (DST): UTC-4 (EDT)
- GNIS feature ID: 1493381

Osaka is a Census-designated place and coal town located in Wise County, Virginia, United States. As of the 2020 census, Osaka had a population of 132. It was served by a (now vanished) branch line of the Appalachia to Stonega railroad that ran along Mud Lick Creek to Roda, which was built in 1896 by Interstate Railroads.

== Demographics ==
Osaka first appeared as a census designated place in the 2020 U.S. census.
