= Dooley, Virginia =

- Unincorporated community
- Location within Virginia Location within the United States
- Coordinates: 36°55′50″N 82°39′16″W
- Country: United States
- State: Virginia
- County: Wise
- Elevation: 2,005 ft (611 m)
- Time zone: UTC-5 (Eastern (EST))
  - Summer (DST): UTC-4 (EDT)
- GNIS feature ID: 1496876

Dooley is an unincorporated community and coal town located in Wise County, Virginia, United States. It was also known as Eolia.
