= Exeter, Virginia =

- Unincorporated community
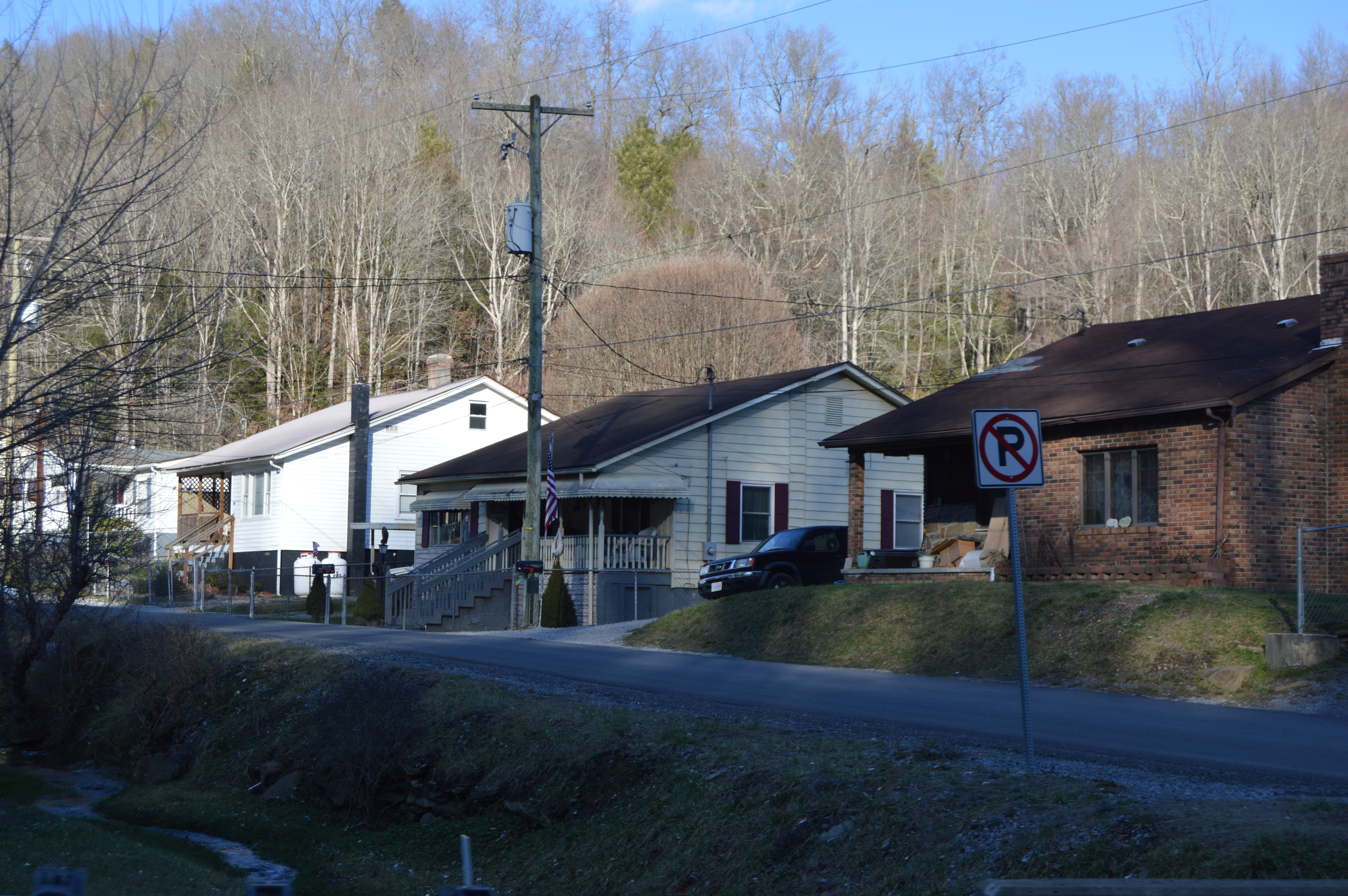
- Houses on Ash Street

- Location within Virginia Location within the United States
- Coordinates: 36°52′33″N 82°51′15″W
- Country: United States
- State: Virginia
- County: Wise
- Elevation: 1,968 ft (600 m)
- Time zone: UTC-5 (Eastern (EST))
  - Summer (DST): UTC-4 (EDT)
- ZIP codes: 24249
- GNIS feature ID: 1492917

Exeter is an unincorporated community and coal town located in Wise County, Virginia, United States.
