= WGCK-FM =

- Coeburn, Virginia; United States
- Broadcast area: Dickenson County, Virginia; Wise County, Virginia; Letcher County, Kentucky
- Frequency: 99.7 MHz
- Branding: K-Love

Programming
- Format: Contemporary Christian
- Network: K-Love

Ownership
- Owner: Letcher County Broadcasting, Inc.

History
- First air date: April 15, 1991
- Former call signs: WZQK (1989–2002); WVSG (2002–2006); WGCK (2006–2009)

Technical information
- Licensing authority: FCC
- Facility ID: 18155
- Class: C3
- ERP: 1,950 watts
- HAAT: 356 meters (1,168 ft)
- Transmitter coordinates: 37°3′15.0″N 82°38′34.0″W

Links
- Public license information: Public file; LMS
- Webcast: Listen live
- Website: klove.com

WGCK-FM is a Contemporary Christian-formatted broadcast radio station licensed to Coeburn, Virginia, serving Dickenson and Wise counties in Virginia and Letcher County in Kentucky. WGCK-FM is owned and operated by Letcher County Broadcasting, Inc.
