= Imboden, Virginia =

- Unincorporated community
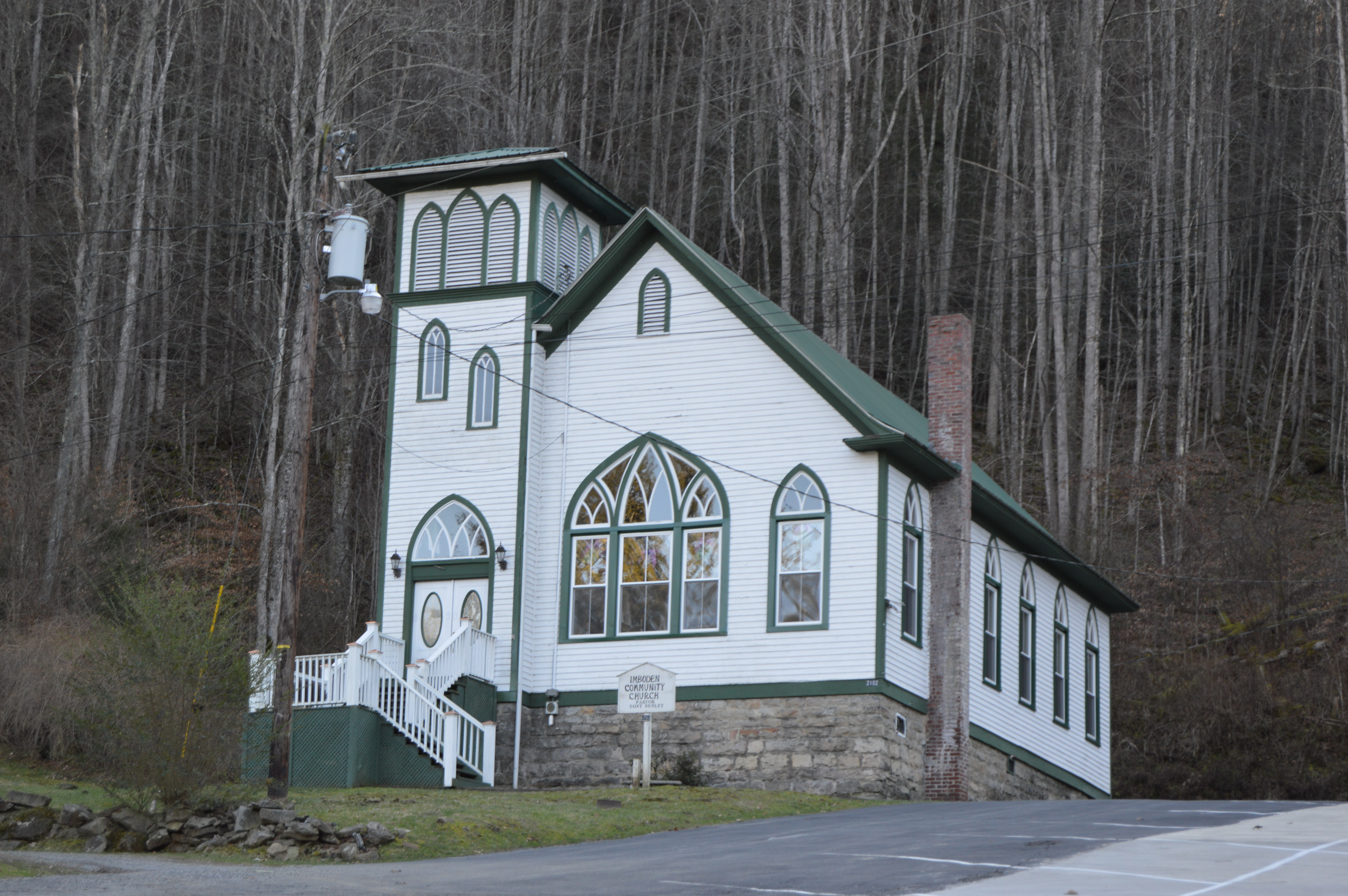
- Imboden Community Church

- Location within Virginia Location within the United States
- Coordinates: 36°53′12″N 82°48′17″W
- Country: United States
- State: Virginia
- County: Wise
- Elevation: 1,693 ft (516 m)
- Time zone: UTC-5 (Eastern (EST))
  - Summer (DST): UTC-4 (EDT)
- GNIS feature ID: 1484310

Imboden is an unincorporated community and coal town in Wise County, Virginia, United States. The town exists between Appalachia and Keokee, Virginia on State Route 606. It was named after Confederate General John Daniel Imboden.
