= Blackwood, Virginia =

- Unincorporated community
- Location within Virginia Location within the United States
- Coordinates: 36°55′30″N 82°41′35″W
- Country: United States
- State: Virginia
- County: Wise
- Elevation: 1,991 ft (607 m)
- Time zone: UTC-5 (Eastern (EST))
  - Summer (DST): UTC-4 (EDT)
- GNIS feature ID: 1496806

Blackwood is an unincorporated community and coal town located in Wise County, Virginia, United States. The community is encountered along US Route 23 Business Route between Big Stone Gap and Norton.
