= Tacoma, Virginia =

- Census-designated place
- Location within Virginia Location within the United States
- Coordinates: 36°56′16″N 82°32′3″W
- Country: United States
- State: Virginia
- County: Wise

Area
  - Total: 0.48 sq mi (1.2 km^{2})
  - Land: 0.469 sq mi (1.21 km^{2})
  - Water: 0.011 sq mi (0.028 km^{2})
- Elevation: 2,008 ft (612 m)

Population (2020)
  - Total: 204
  - Density: 425/sq mi (164/km^{2})
- Time zone: UTC−5 (Eastern (EST))
  - Summer (DST): UTC−4 (EDT)
- GNIS feature ID: 1487766

Tacoma is a Census-designated place and coal town located in Wise County, Virginia, United States with a population of 204 at the 2020 census. It is located within the town of Coeburn.

== Demographics ==
Tacoma first appeared as a census designated place in the 2020 United States census.
