= East Stone Gap, Virginia =

- Census-designated place
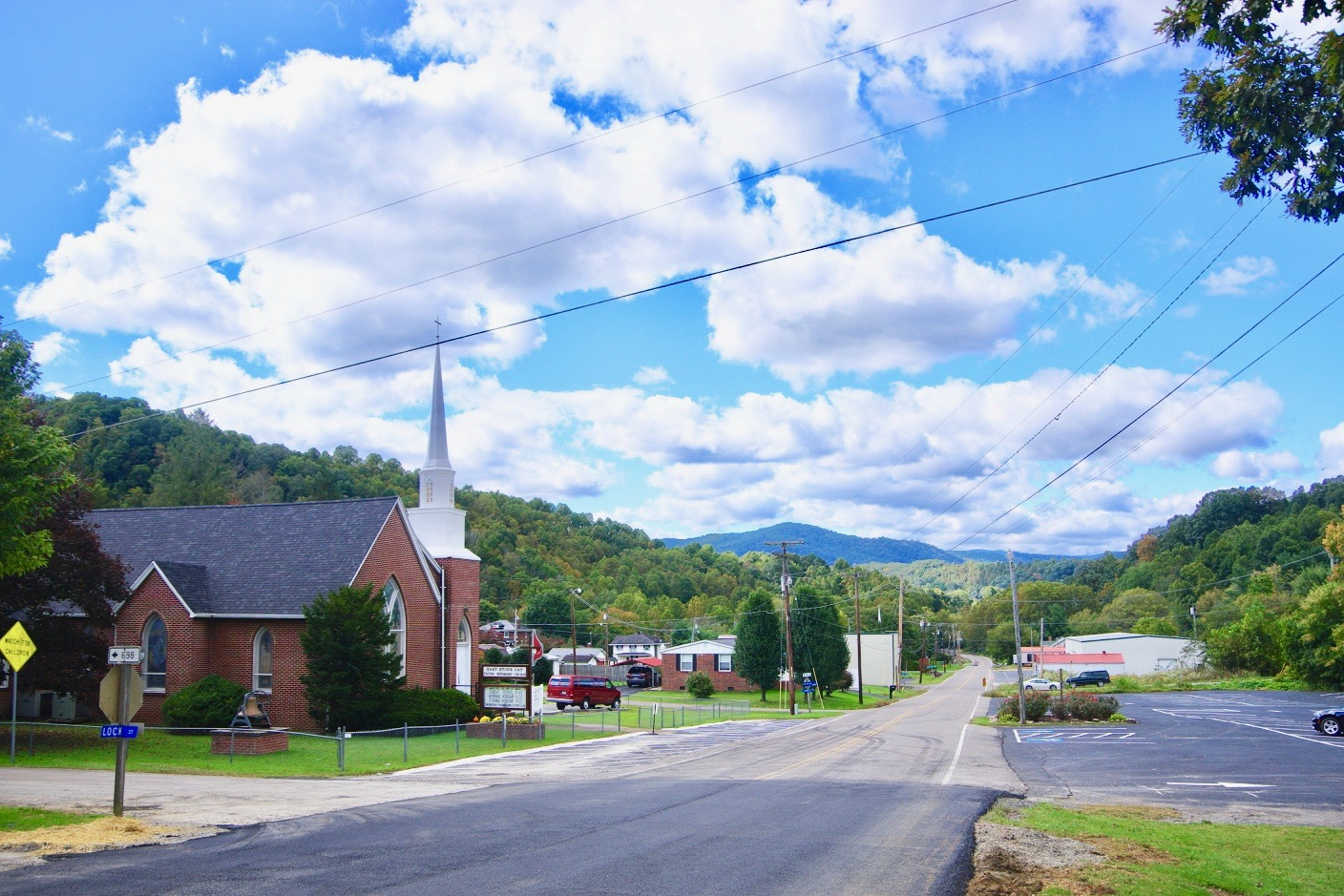
- East Stone Gap Road (SR 613)

- Location within Virginia Location within the United States
- Coordinates: 36°52′00″N 82°44′33″W
- Country: United States
- State: Virginia
- County: Wise
- Elevation: 1,539 ft (469 m)

Population (2020)
  - Total: 537
- Time zone: UTC-5 (Eastern (EST))
  - Summer (DST): UTC-4 (EDT)
- ZIP code: 24246
- Area code: 276
- GNIS feature ID: 1494214

East Stone Gap is an unincorporated community and census-designated place in Wise County, Virginia, United States. East Stone Gap is an eastern suburb of Big Stone Gap; U.S. Route 23 separates the two settlements. It was first listed as a CDP in the 2020 census, with a population of 537. East Stone Gap has a post office, with ZIP code 24246.

== Demographics ==
East Stone Gap first appeared as a census designated place in the 2020 U.S. census.
