= Roaring Fork, Virginia =

- Unincorporated community
- Location within Virginia Location within the United States
- Coordinates: 36°58′9″N 82°44′4″W
- Country: United States
- State: Virginia
- County: Wise
- Elevation: 1,893 ft (577 m)
- Time zone: UTC-5 (Eastern (EST))
  - Summer (DST): UTC-4 (EDT)
- GNIS feature ID: 1497121

Roaring Fork is an unincorporated community and coal town located in Wise County, Virginia, United States.
