= Dorchester, Wise County, Virginia =

Dorchester, Virginia
- Unincorporated community
- Location within Virginia Location within the United States
- Coordinates: 36°56′30″N 82°38′37″W
- Country: United States
- State: Virginia
- County: Wise
- Elevation: 2,014 ft (614 m)
- Time zone: UTC-5 (Eastern (EST))
  - Summer (DST): UTC-4 (EDT)
- GNIS feature ID: 1496877

Dorchester is an unincorporated community and coal town located in Wise County, Virginia, United States.

The community was listed in the 1950 U.S. census (pop 1,129).
