= Derby, Wise County, Virginia =

Derby, Virginia
- Unincorporated community
- Location within Virginia Location within the United States
- Coordinates: 36°56′8″N 82°49′35″W
- Country: United States
- State: Virginia
- County: Wise
- Elevation: 2,031 ft (619 m)
- Time zone: UTC-5 (Eastern (EST))
  - Summer (DST): UTC-4 (EDT)
- GNIS feature ID: 1492864

Derby is an unincorporated community and coal town located in Wise County, Virginia, United States.
