= Riverview, Wise County, Virginia =

Riverview
- CDP
- Location within the Commonwealth of Virginia
- Coordinates: 36°55′58″N 82°29′04″W
- Country: United States
- State: Virginia
- County: Wise

Population (2010)
  - Total: 782
- Time zone: UTC−5 (Eastern (EST))
  - Summer (DST): UTC−4 (EDT)
- ZIP codes: 24230
- FIPS code: 51-67704
- GNIS feature ID: 2629844

Riverview is a census-designated place in Wise County, Virginia, United States, southwest of Coeburn. The population as of the 2010 Census was 782.

== Demographics ==
Historical population
| Census | Pop. | Note | %± |
|---|---|---|---|
| 2010 | 782 | | — |
U.S. Decennial Census; 2010 2020

Riverview was first listed as a census designated place in the 2010 U.S. census.
