= Roda, Virginia =

- Unincorporated community
- Location within Virginia Location within the United States
- Coordinates: 36°58′4″N 82°49′59″W
- Country: United States
- State: Virginia
- County: Wise
- Elevation: 2,031 ft (619 m)
- Time zone: UTC-5 (Eastern (EST))
  - Summer (DST): UTC-4 (EDT)
- GNIS feature ID: 1493501

Roda is an unincorporated community and coal town located in Wise County, Virginia, United States.

Roda is less than two miles from the Kentucky border. While many people usually associate Roda with the town of Appalachia, Virginia, it is actually about six miles away from Roda.
