= Andover, Virginia =

- Unincorporated community
- Location within Virginia Location within the United States
- Coordinates: 36°55′25″N 82°47′48″W
- Country: United States
- State: Virginia
- County: Wise
- Elevation: 1,676 ft (511 m)
- Time zone: UTC-5 (Eastern (EST))
  - Summer (DST): UTC-4 (EDT)
- ZIP code: 24215
- Area code: 276
- GNIS feature ID: 1481320

Andover is an unincorporated community in Wise County, Virginia, United States. Andover is located along Virginia State Route 78, 1.4 miles (2.3 km) northwest of Appalachia. Andover had a post office until it closed on November 3, 2008; it still has its own ZIP code, 24215.
