= Kelly View School =

- U.S. National Register of Historic Places
- Virginia Landmarks Register
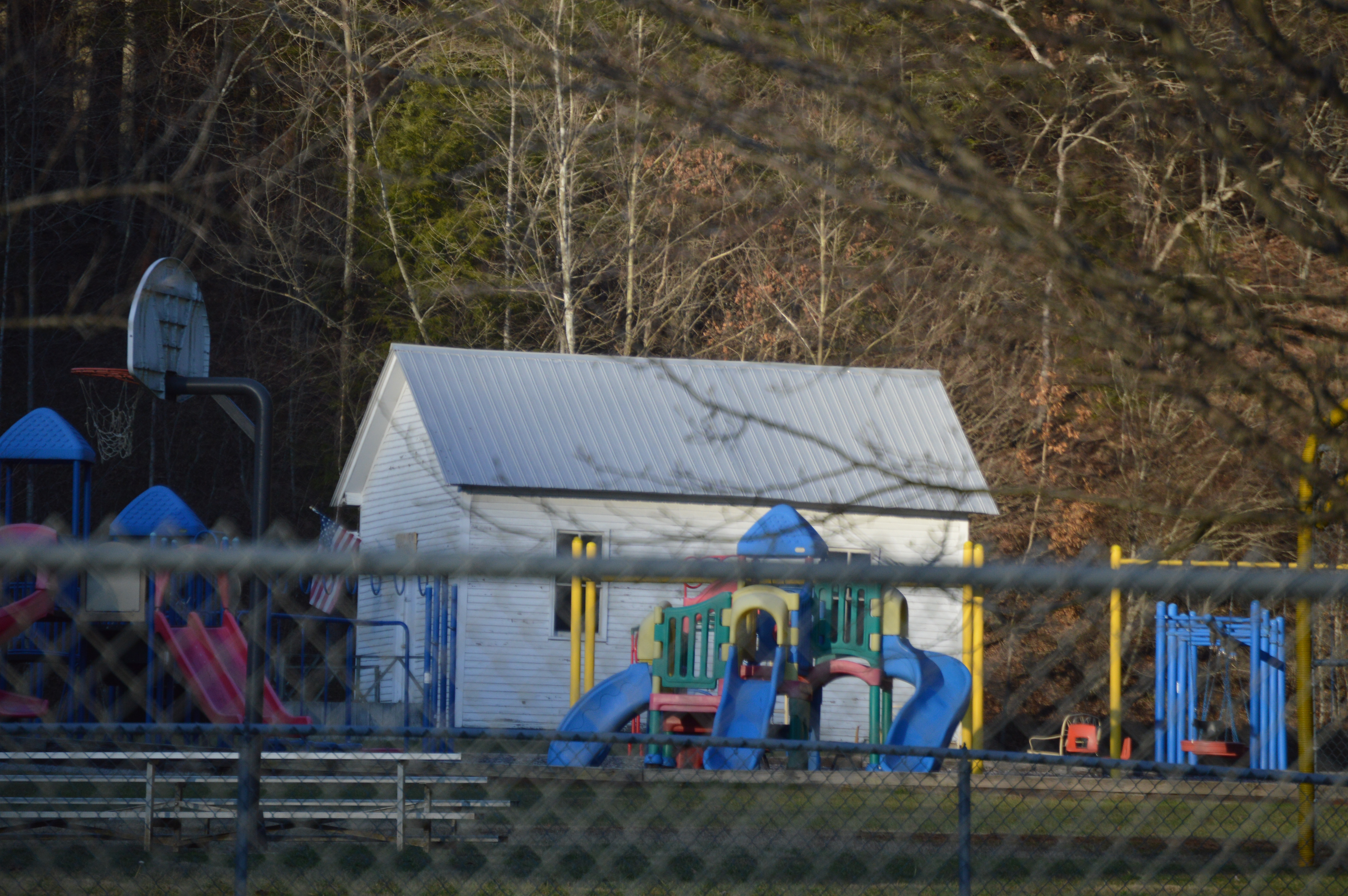
- View from the south

- Location within Virginia Location within the United States
- Location: Appalachia Elementary School, Norton Rd., Old US 23, Appalachia, Virginia
- Coordinates: 36°55′34″N 82°44′37″W
- Area: Less than 1 acre (0.40 ha)
- NRHP reference No.: 06000752
- VLR No.: 097-0308

Significant dates
- Added to NRHP: August 30, 2006
- Designated VLR: June 8, 2006

Kelly View School is a historic one-room school located at Appalachia, Wise County, Virginia. It likely dates to the 1890s, and is a small, one-story, one room frame building with a front gable roof. It sits on a poured concrete foundation and is sheathed in weatherboard. It remained in use as a school until 1959 or 1960, after which it was used as a place of worship, called Kelly View Church.

It was listed on the National Register of Historic Places in 2007.
