= Arno, Virginia =

- Unincorporated community
- Location within Virginia Location within the United States
- Coordinates: 36°55′38″N 82°48′44″W
- Country: United States
- State: Virginia
- County: Wise
- Elevation: 1,791 ft (546 m)
- Time zone: UTC-5 (Eastern (EST))
  - Summer (DST): UTC-4 (EDT)
- GNIS feature ID: 1492488

Arno is an unincorporated community and coal town located in Wise County, Virginia, United States.

== Notable people ==
- Willie Horton, former MLB player (Detroit Tigers, Texas Rangers, Cleveland Indians, Oakland Athletics, Toronto Blue Jays, Seattle Mariners)
