= Pardee, Virginia =

- Unincorporated community
- Location within Virginia Location within the United States
- Coordinates: 37°00′24″N 82°45′6″W
- Country: United States
- State: Virginia
- County: Wise
- Elevation: 2,152 ft (656 m)
- Time zone: UTC-5 (Eastern (EST))
  - Summer (DST): UTC-4 (EDT)
- GNIS feature ID: 1499840

Pardee is an unincorporated community and coal town located in Wise County, Virginia, United States.
