= Needmore, Virginia =

- Unincorporated community
- Location within Virginia Location within the United States
- Coordinates: 36°57′28″N 82°37′58″W
- Country: United States
- State: Virginia
- County: Wise
- Elevation: 2,103 ft (641 m)
- Time zone: UTC-5 (Eastern (EST))
  - Summer (DST): UTC-4 (EDT)
- GNIS feature ID: 1497038

Needmore is an unincorporated community and coal town located in Wise County, Virginia, United States.
