= Derby Historic District =

Historic district in Virginia, United States

- U.S. National Register of Historic Places
- U.S. Historic district
- Virginia Landmarks Register
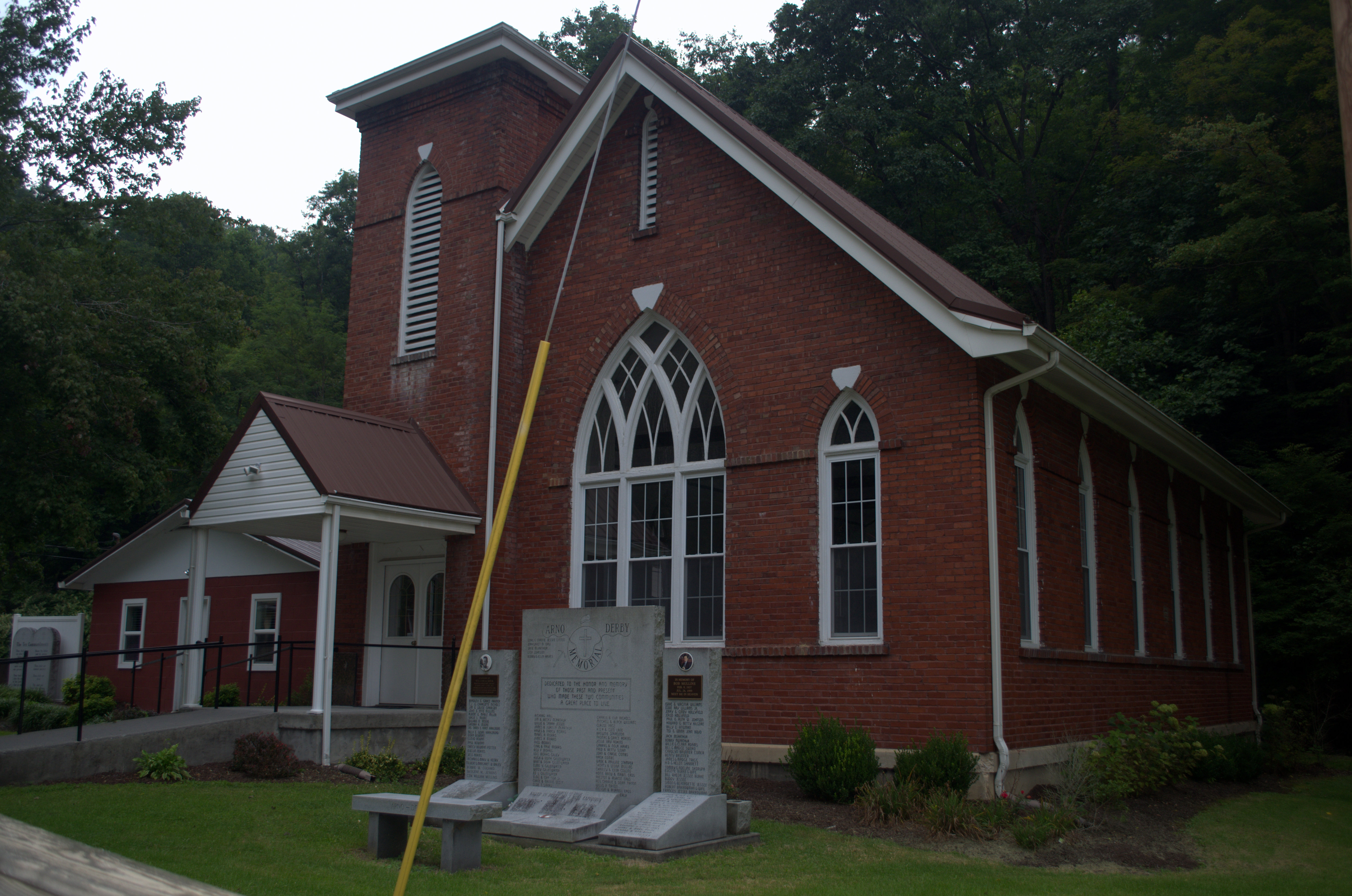
- Derby Church

- Location within Virginia Location within the United States
- Location: VA 686, from a point beginning 1 mi. above the jct. with VA 78 and extending for 1.2 mi. to the NW, Derby, Virginia
- Coordinates: 36°56′02″N 82°49′21″W
- Area: 40 acres (16 ha)
- Built: 1922
- Built by: Nicola Construction Co.
- Architectural style: Colonial Revival, Bungalow/craftsman
- NRHP reference No.: 03001436
- VLR No.: 097-0048

Significant dates
- Added to NRHP: January 16, 2004
- Designated VLR: September 10, 2003

Derby Historic District is a national historic district located in Wise County, Virginia. The district encompasses 102 contributing buildings, 1 contributing site, and 1 contributing structure in the coal company town of Derby. The contributing buildings consist of 72 houses, the Derby Methodist Church, a hose house, 5 company garages, 5 outbuildings, and 18 coal houses. Most of the buildings were built in 1923 of hollow ceramic tile.

It was listed on the National Register of Historic Places in 2004.

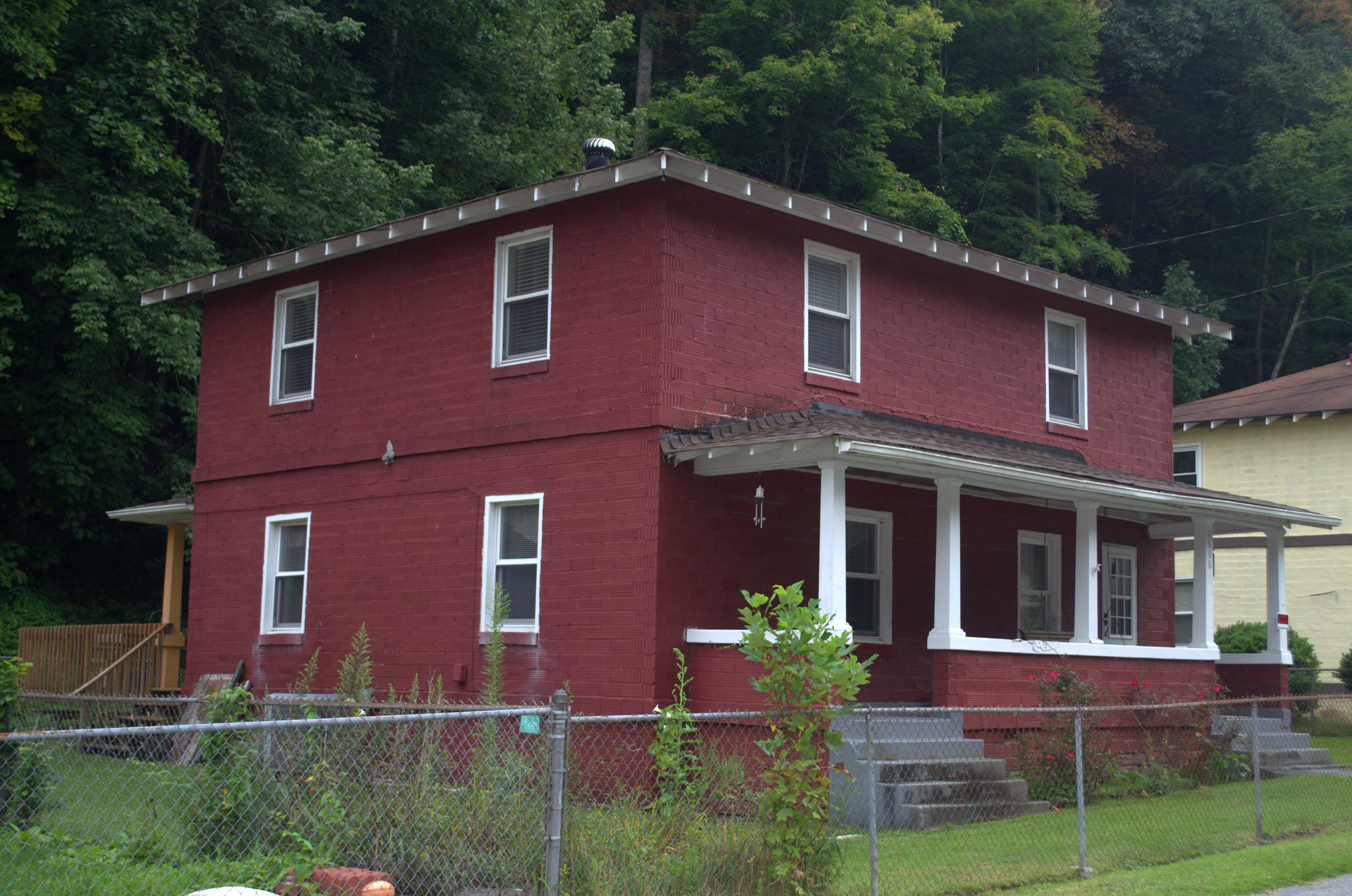
Coal miner's duplex house in Derby
