= Wise County, Virginia =

County in Virginia, United States

- County
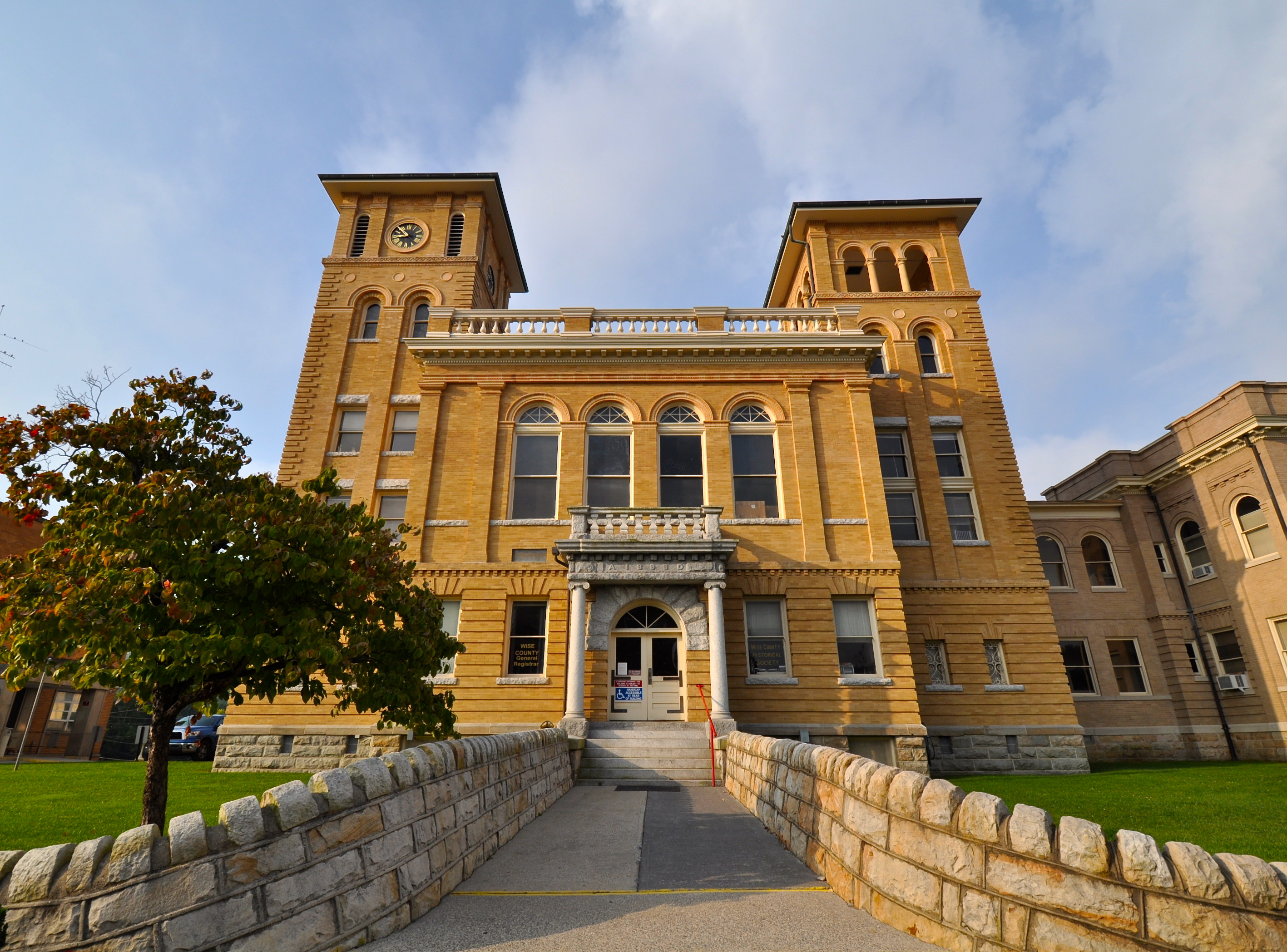
- Wise County Courthouse in Wise

- Seal

- Location within the U.S. state of Virginia
- Coordinates: 36.97°N 82.62°W
- Country: United States
- State: Virginia
- Founded: 1856
- Named for: Henry A. Wise
- Seat: Wise
- Largest town: Big Stone Gap

Area
  - Total: 405 sq mi (1,050 km^{2})
  - Land: 403 sq mi (1,040 km^{2})
  - Water: 2 sq mi (5.2 km^{2}) 0.5%

Population (2020)
  - Total: 36,130
  - Estimate (2025): 34,824 ▼
  - Density: 89.7/sq mi (34.6/km^{2})
- Time zone: UTC−5 (Eastern)
  - Summer (DST): UTC−4 (EDT)
- Congressional district: 9th
- Website: www.wisecounty.org

Wise County is a county located in the U.S. state of Virginia. The county was formed in 1856 from Lee, Scott, and Russell Counties and named for Henry A. Wise, who was the Governor of Virginia at the time. The county seat is in Wise.

== History ==
The Cherokee colonized the area including Wise from the Xualae between 1671 and 1685. It was later contested by the Haudenosaunee and the Shawnee. Cherokee and Shawnee hunting parties fought a protracted battle at the headwaters of the Clinch River for two days in the summer of 1786, a victory for the Cherokee although losses were heavy on both sides.

The first white explorers to reach present-day Wise county are said to have been Thomas Walker and Christopher Gist, both in 1750. Several forts were built all along the Clinch from 1774 onward, but only after Chickamauga Cherokee leader Bob Benge was slain in 1794 was present-day Wise considered safe for white settlers even to hunt in. One of the earliest settlers within the county was William Wells around 1792.

In the 1880s, coal deposits became the dominant resource utilized in the area. The Stonega Coke and Coal Company (SC&C) was formed in the town of Appalachia, Virginia. Immigration trends and economic conditions across the country attracted many people to the area for work, including African Americans and Irish, Polish, Italian, and Hungarian immigrants. On August 6, 1934, seventeen miners died when the Stonega Derby Mine No. 3 exploded.

Virginia's two highest security state prisons are located in Wise County: Red Onion State Prison, opened in 1998, and Wallens Ridge State Prison, opened in 1999.

In July 2012 Dominion Energy built Virginia City Hybrid Energy Center in Wise County, a hybrid power plant that burns 80% coal and up to 20% biomass. In 2014, the plant was fined $47,651 by the Virginia Department of Environmental Quality for emitting carbon monoxide and other gases at levels exceeding state regulations.

== Geography ==
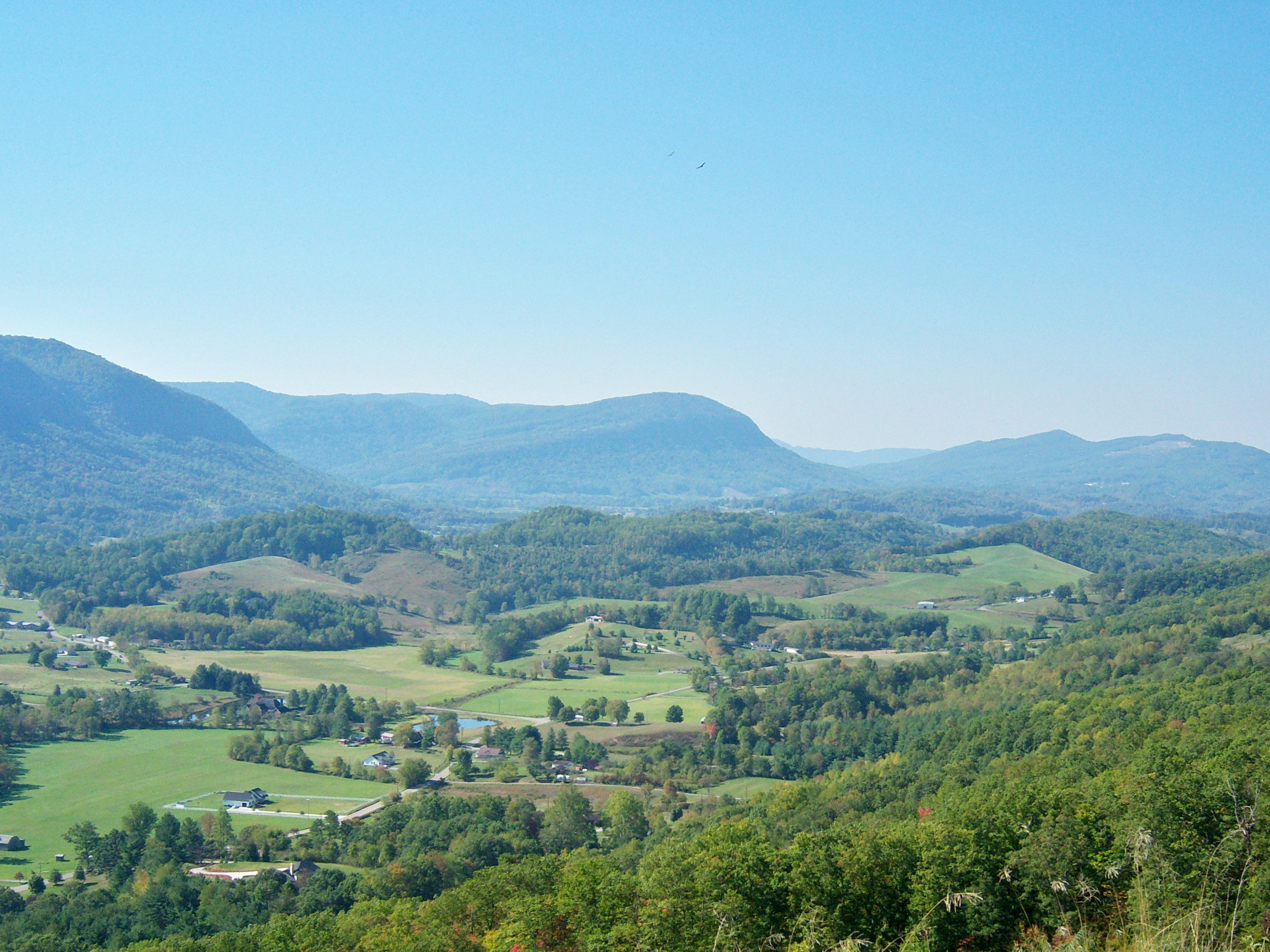
Powell Valley, as viewed from Benge's Gap

According to the U.S. Census Bureau, the county has a total area of 405 square miles (1,050 km^{2}), of which 403 square miles (1,040 km^{2}) is land and 2 square miles (5.2 km^{2}) (0.5%) is water. The county is part of the Appalachians and has many mountainous features, including the peak of High Knob and Powell Valley.

=== Adjacent counties and cities ===
- Letcher County, Kentucky – northwest
- Pike County, Kentucky – north
- Dickenson County – northeast
- Russell County – east
- Scott County – south
- Lee County – southwest
- Harlan County, Kentucky – west
- Norton – enclaved within the county

=== Major highways ===
- U.S. Route 23
- U.S. Route 58 Alternate
- State Route 63
- State Route 72
- State Route 83

=== National protected area ===
- Jefferson National Forest (part)

== Demographics ==
Historical population
Census	Pop.	Note	%±
1860	4,508		—
1870	4,785		6.1%
1880	7,772		62.4%
1890	9,345		20.2%
1900	19,653		110.3%
1910	34,162		73.8%
1920	46,500		36.1%
1930	51,167		10.0%
1940	52,458		2.5%
1950	56,336		7.4%
1960	43,579		−22.6%
1970	35,947		−17.5%
1980	43,863		22.0%
1990	39,573		−9.8%
2000	40,123		1.4%
2010	41,452		3.3%
2020	36,130		−12.8%
2025 (est.)	34,824	▼	−3.6%
U.S. Decennial Census; 1790-1960 1900–1990; 1990-2000 2010 2020

=== Racial and ethnic composition ===
Wise County, Virginia – Racial and ethnic composition Note: the US Census treats Hispanic/Latino as an ethnic category. This table excludes Latinos from the racial categories and assigns them to a separate category. Hispanics/Latinos may be of any race.
Race / Ethnicity (NH = Non-Hispanic)	Pop 1980	Pop 1990	Pop 2000	Pop 2010	Pop 2020	% 1980	% 1990	% 2000	% 2010	% 2020
White alone (NH)	42,653	38,596	38,681	38,301	32,586	97.24%	97.53%	96.41%	92.40%	90.19%
Black or African American alone (NH)	850	706	708	2,118	1,771	1.94%	1.78%	1.76%	5.11%	4.90%
Native American or Alaska Native alone (NH)	38	34	55	51	48	0.09%	0.09%	0.14%	0.12%	0.13%
Asian alone (NH)	99	115	118	141	150	0.23%	0.29%	0.29%	0.34%	0.42%
Native Hawaiian or Pacific Islander alone (NH)	x	x	2	2	11	x	x	0.00%	0.00%	0.03%
Other race alone (NH)	19	9	33	20	86	0.04%	0.02%	0.08%	0.05%	0.24%
Mixed race or Multiracial (NH)	x	x	234	348	1,026	x	x	0.58%	0.84%	2.84%
Hispanic or Latino (any race)	204	113	292	471	452	0.47%	0.29%	0.73%	1.14%	1.25%
Total	43,863	39,573	40,123	41,452	36,130	100.00%	100.00%	100.00%	100.00%	100.00%

=== 2020 census ===
As of the 2020 census, the county had a population of 36,130. The median age was 42.8 years. 19.3% of residents were under the age of 18 and 20.2% of residents were 65 years of age or older. For every 100 females there were 105.5 males, and for every 100 females age 18 and over there were 106.3 males age 18 and over.

The racial makeup of the county was 90.8% White, 5.0% Black or African American, 0.2% American Indian and Alaska Native, 0.4% Asian, 0.0% Native Hawaiian and Pacific Islander, 0.5% from some other race, and 3.2% from two or more races. Hispanic or Latino residents of any race comprised 1.3% of the population.

34.6% of residents lived in urban areas, while 65.4% lived in rural areas.

There were 14,367 households in the county, of which 26.8% had children under the age of 18 living with them and 28.8% had a female householder with no spouse or partner present. About 30.2% of all households were made up of individuals and 14.4% had someone living alone who was 65 years of age or older.

There were 16,644 housing units, of which 13.7% were vacant. Among occupied housing units, 70.4% were owner-occupied and 29.6% were renter-occupied. The homeowner vacancy rate was 2.4% and the rental vacancy rate was 10.9%.

=== 2010 census ===
As of the census of 2010, there were 41,452 people, 15,968 households, and 10,892 families residing in the county. The population density was 102.8 people per square mile (39.7 people/km^{2}). There were 17,940 housing units at an average density of 44 units per square mile (17 units/km^{2}).

There were 15,968 households, out of which 31.80% had children under the age of 18 living with them, 50.30% were married couples living together, 12.60% had a female householder with no husband present, and 31.80% were non-families. 27.40% of all households were made up of individuals, and 11.40% had someone living alone who was 65 years of age or older. The average household size was 2.40 and the average family size was 2.90.

In the county, the population was spread out, with 20.80% under the age of 18 and 14.10% who were 65 years of age or older. The median age was 39 years. For every 100 females there were 107 males. For every 100 females age 18 and over, there were 107.08 males.

The median income for a household in the county was $35,053. The per capita income for the county was $17,512. About 19.30% of the population were below the poverty line. The homeownership rate for the county is 70.00%

== Education ==
=== Public schools ===
Wise County Public Schools operates thirteen school facilities in the county for its students. For several years the Wise County School Board has considered consolidating high schools, and in 2011 it consolidated six high schools into three; Union High which serves the western part of the county, Central High which serves the central and northern parts of the county, and Eastside High which serves the eastern part of the county.

=== Private schools ===
Wise County Christian School operates as a private school in the county.

=== Colleges and universities ===
- University of Virginia's College at Wise, Wise
- Mountain Empire Community College, Big Stone Gap

== Media ==
=== Newspapers ===
- The Clinch Valley Times is a weekly newspaper serving Castlewood and St. Paul, Virginia, and the surrounding areas.
- The Coalfield Progress is a twice-weekly newspaper covering news through the county.
- The Post is a weekly newspaper and website serving Big Stone Gap, Virginia and the surrounding areas.

=== Radio stations ===
- WAXM
- WDXC
- WGCK-FM
- WISE-FM (simulcast of WVTF)
- WLSD
- WNVA (AM)
- WQSN

== Tourist attractions ==
=== Natural and outdoor recreation ===
High Knob Observation Tower

A large portion of the Jefferson National Forest is contained within Wise County, and the Clinch River winds through the county. These two factors, combined with Wise County's location in the Appalachian Mountains, mean that Wise County offers many opportunities for outdoor recreation.

In addition to many trails connecting to and surrounding the Appalachian Trail system, Wise county is home to many parks, including Miners' Park in Big Stone Gap and the Louis E. Henegar Miners' Memorial Park in Appalachia.

Among the unique features of Wise County are High Knob, a mountain which featured one of the last remaining Appalachian Fire Towers until its destruction by arson on October 31, 2007, and the Wetlands Estonoa Project, an Appalachian Wetland and part of the Clinch River Watershed.

=== Theater and the arts ===
- The Trail of the Lonesome Pine Outdoor Drama is performed in Big Stone Gap, Virginia throughout the summer. It is the Commonwealth of Virginia's official outdoor drama.
- The Pro-Art Association offers a variety of theatrical, musical, and fine-arts events throughout the school year. It is headquartered in Wise.
- The Wise County Summer Academy of Art, sponsored by Wise County Public Schools and funded in part by the Virginia Commission of Arts, provides fine arts programming for children throughout the summer months, including large scale productions and touring performance opportunities.
- The Appalachian Children's Theater (ACT) promotes performing arts and fine arts education for children in Southwest Virginia, Eastern Kentucky, and Northeast Tennessee. In 2006, the organization opened its newly renovated facility in Downtown Wise.
- The Charles W. Harris Art Gallery is located on the site of the Wise County Public Library in Wise.

=== Festivals and fairs ===
- "Clinch River Days" is a festival to celebrate mountain heritage and takes place in St. Paul each spring.
- Best Friend Festival held in Norton, VA annually.
- The Virginia-Kentucky District Fair is held each summer in Wise.
- The Wise County Famous Fall Fling is an annual event held in Downtown Wise.
- Coeburn holds its annual Guest River Rally over the Labor Day weekend in September.
- Appalachia Coal Railroad Days is held each summer in Appalachia.
- Pound Heritage Days is held annually the week before Labor Day in Pound.
- Dock Boggs Oldtime Music Festival held the second weekend in September at the Country Cabin in Norton, Virginia.
- Mountain Craft Days held the third weekend of October on the campus of Mountain Empire Community College in Big Stone Gap, Virginia.
- The RTE 23 Music Festival is held at the end of August ever year on the campus of the University of Virginia's College at Wise.

=== Historical ===
- National Register of Historic Places listings in Wise County, Virginia
- Southwest Virginia Museum Historical State Park
- Wise County Courthouse
- High Knob Lookout Tower
- Colonial Hotel
- E. M. Fulton House
- Derby Historic District

=== Sports ===
- Lonesome Pine Raceway

UVa-Wise hosts NCAA Division II Baseball, Basketball, Football, Lacrosse, Softball, and other inter-collegiate games on the campus of UVa-Wise.

== Communities ==
- The independent city of Norton lies within the confines of Wise County, but is not a part of the county.

=== Towns ===
- Appalachia
- Big Stone Gap
- Coeburn
- Pound
- St. Paul
- Wise

=== Census-designated places ===
- Big Stone Gap East
- Dunbar
- East Stone Gap
- Osaka
- Riverview
- Stonega
- Tacoma
- University of Virginia's College at Wise

=== Unincorporated communities ===
- Andover
- Arno
- Banner
- Blackwood
- Clear Creek
- Cracker Neck
- Cranes Nest
- Derby
- Dooley
- Dorchester
- Dwina
- Esserville
- Exeter
- Flatwoods
- Franco
- Gilley
- Glamorgan
- Imboden
- Inman
- Irondale
- Kent Junction
- Linden
- Lipps
- Needmore
- Pardee
- Roaring Fork
- Roda
- Toms Creek
- Virginia City

== Notable people ==
- Rufus A. Ayers – Lawyer, businessman, and Attorney General of Virginia 1886–1890
- Carroll Dale – Football player for the Los Angeles Rams and Green Bay Packers
- Willie Horton- MLB player and coach; 4x All-Star and 1968 World Series Champion.
- John Fox Jr. – Journalist, novelist, and short story writer
- Napoleon Hill – American self-help author
- A. Linwood Holton – Virginia political figure and attorney. He served as the 61st governor of Virginia, from 1970 to 1974.
- Julius Jones – American football running back in the National Football League for the Dallas Cowboys, Seattle Seahawks, and New Orleans Saints
- Thomas Jones – Actor and former American football running back who played twelve seasons in the National Football League
- Holly Kiser – First Make Me a Supermodel winner
- Edith Maxwell – Schoolteacher convicted of murdering her father, triggering a nationwide media sensation
- Glen Roberts – American National Basketball League player; one of the first players to put the "jump shot" to practical use
- George C. Scott – Stage and film actor, director and producer. He was best known for his stage work, as well as his portrayal of General George S. Patton in the film Patton.
- Ralph Stanley – Bluegrass artist, known for his distinctive singing and banjo playing. Stanley began playing music in 1946 and was inducted into both the International Bluegrass Music Hall of Honor and the Grand Ole Opry.
- Adriana Trigiani – Author of sixteen books, television writer, film director, and entrepreneur.
- Steven Jason Williams, better known by his alias Boogie2988, an American YouTube personality born in Abingdon, Virginia. He was raised in St. Paul.

== Politics ==
United States presidential election results for Wise County, Virginia
Year	Republican		Democratic		Third party(ies)	
Year	No.	%	No.	%	No.	%
1912	851	31.08%	1,279	46.71%	608	22.21%
1916	1,862	55.33%	1,468	43.63%	35	1.04%
1920	3,236	55.29%	2,587	44.20%	30	0.51%
1924	3,322	40.39%	4,157	50.55%	745	9.06%
1928	4,504	49.70%	4,559	50.30%	0	0.00%
1932	2,405	31.06%	5,276	68.13%	63	0.81%
1936	2,057	27.54%	5,399	72.28%	14	0.19%
1940	1,448	24.14%	4,538	75.66%	12	0.20%
1944	1,817	28.30%	4,588	71.46%	15	0.23%
1948	2,836	36.15%	4,862	61.98%	147	1.87%
1952	3,911	45.16%	4,729	54.61%	20	0.23%
1956	4,871	46.41%	5,567	53.04%	57	0.54%
1960	3,876	39.89%	5,822	59.92%	18	0.19%
1964	3,309	31.40%	7,220	68.51%	10	0.09%
1968	5,004	39.70%	5,942	47.14%	1,660	13.17%
1972	6,739	59.94%	4,402	39.16%	101	0.90%
1976	5,691	42.63%	7,134	53.43%	526	3.94%
1980	5,767	43.89%	6,779	51.59%	595	4.53%
1984	7,909	51.36%	7,303	47.43%	187	1.21%
1988	6,189	46.23%	7,017	52.42%	180	1.34%
1992	5,144	34.62%	7,681	51.70%	2,032	13.68%
1996	4,660	35.59%	6,712	51.27%	1,720	13.14%
2000	6,504	48.87%	6,412	48.17%	394	2.96%
2004	8,330	58.20%	5,802	40.54%	180	1.26%
2008	8,914	63.05%	4,995	35.33%	229	1.62%
2012	11,076	73.75%	3,760	25.04%	182	1.21%
2016	12,086	79.71%	2,701	17.81%	376	2.48%
2020	13,366	80.45%	3,110	18.72%	139	0.84%
2024	13,655	81.22%	3,036	18.06%	121	0.72%
