= Cody Edwards =

American football coach (born c. 1988)

Current position
- Title: Head coach
- Team: Concord
- Conference: MEC
- Record: 4–7

Biographical details
- Born: c. 1988 (age 37–38); Haysi, Virginia, U.S.
- Education: University of Virginia's College at Wise (2010); Tusculum University (2021)

Playing career
- 2006–2009: Virginia–Wise
- Position: Wide receiver

Coaching career (HC unless noted)
- 2010: Eastside HS (VA) (WR/DB)
- 2011: Emory and Henry (intern)
- 2012: Tennessee (intern)
- 2013: John Carroll (assistant DB/DQC)
- 2014–2015: Royal Palm Beach HS (FL) (DC)
- 2016: John Cooper School (TX) (DC)
- 2017: Keiser (co-DC/S)
- 2018: Tusculum (S)
- 2019: Tusculum (DC/LB)
- 2020: Tusculum (assoc. HC/DC/LB)
- 2021: Western Carolina (DQC)
- 2022–2023: Western Carolina (LB)
- 2024: Western Carolina (ST/LB)
- 2025–present: Concord

Head coaching record
- Overall: 4–7

Cody Edwards (born c. 1988) is an American college football coach. He is the head football coach for Concord University, a position he has held since 2025. He also coached for Eastside High School, Emory & Henry, Tennessee, John Carroll, Royal Palm Beach High School, The John Cooper School, Keiser, Tusculum, and Western Carolina. He played college football for Virginia–Wise as a wide receiver.

== Head coaching record ==
Year	Team	Overall	Conference	Standing	Bowl/playoffs
Concord Mountain Lions (Mountain East Conference) (2025–present)
2025	Concord	4–7	2–6	8th	
Concord:		4–7	2–6		
Total:		4–7			
