= Appalachia High School =

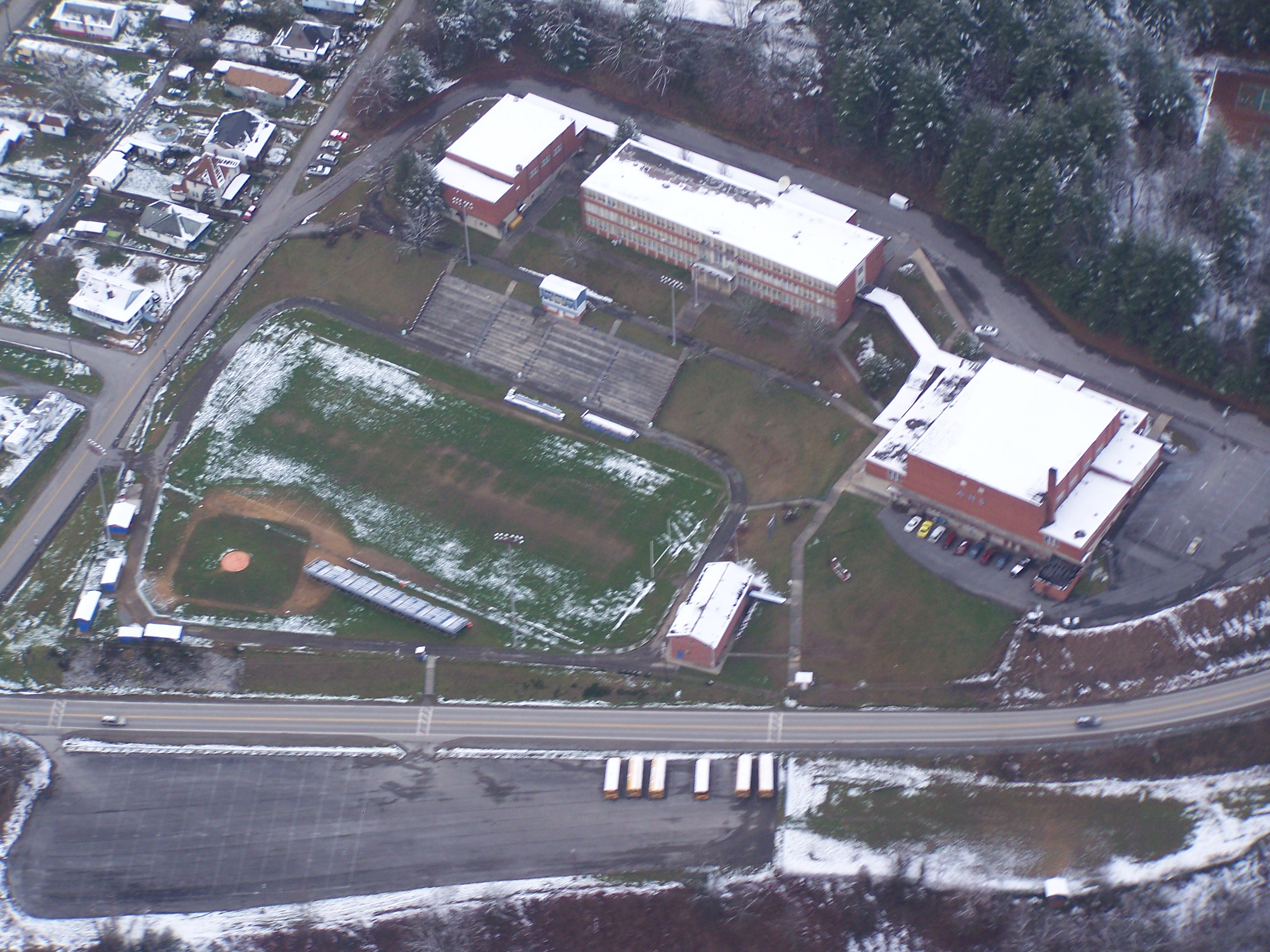

Location
- 205 Lee Street; Appalachia, Virginia 24216; United States; 36°54′31.1″N 82°46′22.2″W

Information
- School type: Public, high school
- Closed: 2011
- School district: Wise County Public Schools
- Grades: 8-12
- Enrollment: 218 (2009)
- Language: English
- Colors: Royal Blue and Gold
- Athletics conference: Lonesome Pine District; Region D
- Mascot: Bulldog
- Newspaper: The Bulldog Bark

Appalachia High School, located in Appalachia, Virginia, United States, was a part of Wise County Public Schools. The school taught students from 8th through 12th grades, with an average enrollment of 350. It was awarded a Bronze Medal in U.S. News & World Report's 2009 Best High Schools.

In 2011, Appalachia consolidated with neighboring Powell Valley High School, located in Big Stone Gap. The new consolidated school was located in the former PVHS building until completion of the new facility in 2012 and is called Union High School, a name derived from the combination of two traditional rivals into one single school.

== History ==
Appalachia High School opened in the 1916–1917 school year. That year, Dr. J. J. Kelly, Wise County's new Superintendent of Schools, gave out diplomas at the first graduation in the spring of 1917. The original building was constructed in 1911, with an additional structure added in 1915. Both of these early buildings burned down in 1924 and were replaced, with contractors using local Wise County bricks. A new building was subsequencly constructed in 1960.

During the summer of 2011, Appalachia High School closed and was consolidated with neighboring Powell Valley High School in Big Stone Gap due to low enrollment and operational costs. This consolidated school was named Union High School.

== Location ==
The school is publicly noted for its scenic location at the top of a small hill, in overview of the nearby mountains, and about 900 yards from the rest of town, as well as being a short distance from the elementary school. In most parts of the campus the town of Appalachia can clearly be seen, particularly the regions of town near Main Street. The school is split into four buildings surrounding the football field in a crescent shape with the field closest to the nearby mountains. The buildings are all bordered on the outside by parking lots, on the far end (leaving path) is a moderate suburb of the town. In all other directions, forestry covers the large hillside, with the tennis court on a trail a short distance in. The buildings are home to (in the order they appear as one enters the campus.): "The Doghouse", which contains the personal weight and locker rooms for athletes. The second building is a two-story building that houses the gymnasium, the cafeteria, the band/music room, and the boiler room, as well as boy's and girl's locker rooms for day to day use, the Health room, the school store, and the athletic trophy display. The third building is the largest building on campus. It contains most of the school's classrooms, taking place inside of its three stories with the guidance office, the main office, the library, a small underground storm shelter, and two computer labs. The last of the four buildings is the auditorium, with enough room to seat all students, and a large theatrical/presentation stage, as well as the in-school-suspension room underground.

In 2023, the main classroom building and auditorium buildings were torn down and "The Doghouse" would be renamed to the "Turner Field House" in honor of legendary Bulldog head coach Tom Turner, who lead the Bulldogs to five state championship appearances before his retirement soon after and his death in 2006. His son Travis, who was Appalachia's starting quarterback from 1994 to 1997(winning three state championships in the process), is served head football coach of Union High School in Big Stone Gap from the school's opening in 2011 to 2025 when he was placed under investigation by the Virginia State Police for child sex related crimes. As of September 2026, Turner is still on the run and has yet to be found.

== Athletics ==
Appalachia won state championships in football in 1971, 1989, 1992, 1994, 1996, and 1997. The school also won the state championship in boys basketball in 1972 and girls basketball in 2000. The girls beat JJ Kelly, from the same district, in their sixth meeting of the season, 49-41.

In 2001, the school took that Virginia Group A championships in both the 400-meter sprint and the 200 hurdles when Roshana Jackson won both events. Forrest Stuart won the Virginia Group A State Championship in the boys 110 hurdles in 2009 and 2010.

== Notable alumni ==
- Ollan Cassell
- Paul Davis, American football player
