= Pound High School =

Location
- 11531 Wildcat Drive; Pound, Virginia 24279; United States; 37°7′40.1″N 82°35′53.1″W

Information
- School type: Public, high school
- Founded: 1953
- Closed: 2011
- School district: Wise County Public Schools
- Grades: 9-12
- Enrollment: 251 (2009)
- Language: English
- Colors: Black and Red
- Athletics conference: Lonesome Pine District; Region D
- Mascot: Wildcats

Pound High School was a public high school located in Pound, Virginia. In 2011, Pound High School was closed and consolidated with J. J. Kelly High School to form Central High School in Wise, Virginia.

== Notable alumni ==
- Glenn Roberts - Inducted to the Virginia Sports Hall of Fame.
