= Carroll Dale =

American football player (born 1938)

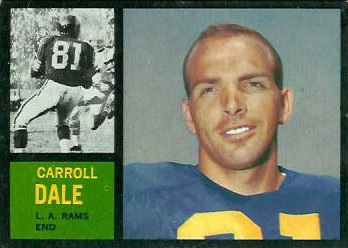
- Dale in 1962

No. 81, 84
- Positions: Wide receiver, tight end

Personal information
- Born: April 24, 1938 (age 88); Wise, Virginia, U.S.
- Listed height: 6 ft 2 in (1.88 m)
- Listed weight: 200 lb (91 kg)

Career information
- High school: Wise
- College: Virginia Tech
- NFL draft: 1960: 8th round, 86th overall pick
- AFL draft: 1960

Career history
- Los Angeles Rams (1960–1964); Green Bay Packers (1965–1972); Minnesota Vikings (1973)

Awards and highlights
- 3× NFL champion (1965, 1966, 1967); 2× Super Bowl champion (I, II); 3× Pro Bowl (1968-1970); Green Bay Packers Hall of Fame; First-team All-American (1959); Second-team All-American (1958); Virginia Tech Hokies No. 84 retired

Career NFL statistics
- Receptions: 438
- Receiving yards: 8,277
- Receiving touchdowns: 52
- Stats at Pro Football Reference
- College Football Hall of Fame

Carroll Wayne Dale (born April 24, 1938) is an American former professional football player who was a wide receiver in the National Football League (NFL) for the Los Angeles Rams, Green Bay Packers, and Minnesota Vikings. He has been inducted into the College Football Hall of Fame. Dale was an All-American playing college football for the Virginia Tech Hokies, and has been inducted into Virginia Tech’s Sports Hall of Fame. In 1965, he became a member of the Green Bay Packers teams that won three straight NFL championships, and the first two Super Bowls, and has been inducted into the Packers Hall of Fame. He was selected to three consecutive Pro Bowls (1968 to 1970). Dale was originally from Wise, Virginia and returned to live in Wise after becoming the first full-time athletic director at the University of Virginia College at Wise.

== Early life ==
Dale was born on April 24, 1938, in Wise, Virginia. He was raised in Wise, and attended J. J. Kelly High School (also known as Wise High School), a school with only 750 students. Dale was class president in high school. In the Summer of 1955, he was selected to attend Boys' State, at the Virginia Polytechnic Institute (Virginia Tech) in Blacksburg, Virginia. Dale was sponsored by the Kiwanis Club, and was among those further selected to attend the National Boys' Meeting in Washington, D.C.

Dale played three sports in high school; football, basketball, and baseball. Dale played on Wise's football team as a two-way player. As a senior in 1955, he was named as captain (highest vote recipient) of both the offensive (end) and defensive (end) teams on the District Eight All-Star football team. He played on two high school championship football teams (1954 and 1955), and was selected All-County, All-District, and All-State, as well as being an honorable mention All-American.

He was on Kelly's basketball team for four years, was an All-Conference basketball player in three seasons, and averaged 21.8 points per game as a senior. Dale's mother preferred that he play basketball over football.

== College career ==
Dale initially signed a letter of intent to attend the University of Tennessee on an athletic scholarship. "The size of that city, Knoxville, just kind of scared me and I left," Dale later recalled. He instead attended Virginia Tech, located in the small town of Blacksburg, Virginia, where he studied mechanical engineering.

Dale played football for the Hokies from 1956 to 1959, in the Southern Conference, under head coach Frank Moseley. He was again a two-way player, as well as becoming the team's punter. He was a wide receiver on offense, and on defense Dale has been described as a "floating end" and "corner man" during his Virginia Tech career. He was considered one of the fastest receivers among southern colleges.

Dale was a starter as a freshman in 1956, even though it was rare for Moseley to start freshmen on his football teams. Dale led the Hokies in receptions (8), receiving yards (157), and yards per reception (19.6). His three receiving touchdowns were tied for most in the Southern Conference. He also played end on defense, doing very well as a freshman. As a sophomore (1957), he led the Hokies with 17 receptions and 171 receiving yards.

As a junior in 1958, he had 25 receptions for 459 yards, leading the team in both categories. His 18.4 yards per reception and six receiving touchdowns led the Southern Conference that season. Dale was awarded the Southern Conference's Jacobs Blocking Trophy that season, after throwing key blocks in a number of games during the year. Dale also continued playing fine defense during that season. Dale was named team captain for the 1959 season. He again led the team in receptions (17), receiving yards (408), yards per reception (24.0) and receiving touchdowns (six). He punted 36 times that year for 1,181 yards (32.8 yards per punt). He was runner up for the Jacobs Blocking Trophy in 1959.

During his college career Dale played in all 40 Hokies' games, starting 39 consecutive games. As a receiver, over four years he had 67 receptions for 1,195 yards (17.8 yards per reception) and 15 receiving touchdowns.

=== College honors ===
He won numerous honors and awards, in addition to the 1958 Jacobs Blocking Trophy. Dale was named an Associated Press (AP) second-team All-American in both 1958 and 1959. In 1959, he was named a first-team All-American at wide receiver in the Newspaper Enterprise Association (NEA) coaches poll, and by Look magazine. Dale was named Southern Conference player of the year in 1958. He was the honorary captain of the 1958 All-Southern Conference team. The AP selected Dale first-team All-Southern Conference again in 1959. The Roanoke Touchdown Club named him Lineman of the Year for three consecutive years (1957 to 1959). He was chosen to play in the December 1959 Blue Gray Game, the January 1960 All-American Bowl and Senior Bowl, and the August 1960 Chicago College All-Star Game against the defending 1959 NFL champion Baltimore Colts. Dale started in the Chicago game against the Colts.

== Professional career ==
=== Los Angeles Rams ===
Dale was selected in the eighth round of the 1960 NFL draft by the Los Angeles Rams, 86th overall. Prior to the NFL draft, he was also selected in the first American Football League draft by the team that was to play in Minneapolis-St. Paul. Dale signed a contract to play for the Rams in January 1960.

In Dale's first Rams game, on September 23, 1960 against the St. Louis Cardinals, he caught a 54-yard touchdown pass from quarterback Frank Ryan. It was reported at the time Dale "made a brilliant one hand running catch of the throw". He caught a 40-yard touchdown pass from Billy Wade later that season. As a rookie in 1960, he played in all 12 Rams games, starting one game. He had 19 receptions for 336 yards (17.7 yards per receptions) and three touchdowns.

He became a full-time starting receiver in 1961, starting all 14 games with 35 receptions for 561 yards and two touchdown receptions. In 1962, he started nine of the 14 games in which he appeared, with 29 receptions for 584 yards and three touchdowns. His 20.1 yards per reception led the Rams, and was fifth best in the NFL that season. He started eight games in 1963, with 34 receptions for 638 yards and seven touchdown receptions. His 18.8 yards per receptions led the Rams, and was eighth best in the NFL. In Dale's fifth and final season with the Rams, he started 13 games, with 32 receptions for 544 yards and two touchdowns, and his 17.0 yards per reception was ninth best in the NFL.

In five seasons with the Rams, he started 45 games, with 149 receptions for 2,663 yards and 17 receiving touchdowns. His 17.9 yards per reception average as a Ram ranks sixth all-time among Rams players with at least 110 receptions (through 2025).

=== Green Bay Packers ===
On April 13, 1965, he was traded to the Green Bay Packers in exchange for linebacker Dan Currie. Dale believed that his former Rams' receivers coach, Tom Fears, who had gone on to assist Packers head coach Vince Lombardi in Green Bay, played a role in the trade. At the time, the Packers had lost their No. 1 draft choice Larry Elkins to the American Football League, and Lombardi said "We lost our first draft choice and, as a result, we need a receiver with speed". Dale preferred playing in a small city like Green Bay, over a large city like Los Angeles where he was unhappy, as he was "a small-town guy at heart".

The Packers were NFL champions during Dale's first season in Green Bay (1965). During the regular season, he caught 20 passes for 382 yards (19.1 yards per reception), with two touchdowns. He had three receptions for 63 yards in the divisional round playoff win over the Baltimore Colts. In the 1965 NFL Championship Game against the Cleveland Browns, he had two receptions for 60 yards. He scored the first touchdown in the Packers 23–12 win over the Browns, on a 47-yard pass from Bart Starr. The ball had slipped while Starr was passing, and Dale saw the ball was thrown short and came back to catch it. He left two defenders sliding on the muddy field, and outraced three others to score the touchdown. He had the most receiving yards (123) in the NFL playoffs in 1965.

In 1966, the Packers again won the NFL Championship, and then the first AFL-NFL Championship Game (later formally known as the Super Bowl). Dale started all 14 games for the Packers, playing both tight end and wide receiver during the season. He was second on the Packers with 37 receptions and led the team in receiving yards (876), yards per reception (23.7) and receiving touchdowns (7). He was second in the NFL in yards per reception, and eighth in total receiving yards, receiving touchdowns, and receiving yards per game.

The Packers defeated the Dallas Cowboys, 34–27, in the NFL Championship Game. Dale had five receptions for 128 yards. He caught a 51-yard touchdown pass from Starr in the game, beating defensive back Cornell Green on the play. The Packers then defeated the Kansas City Chiefs in Super Bowl I, 35–10. Dale had four receptions for 59 yards. Dale had the most receptions (9) and receiving yards (187) in the playoffs that season.

In 1967, the Packers won the NFL Championship for a third consecutive season. Dale had 35 receptions for 738 yards and five touchdowns. He led the team in receiving touchdowns and yards per reception. His 21.1 yards per reception was sixth best in the NFL. In the Packers 1967 divisional round 28–7 win over the Los Angeles Rams, Dale had six receptions for 109 yards, including a 17-yard touchdown reception, and a long reception of 48 yards. The Packers then defeated the Cowboys, 21–17, in the 1967 NFL Championship Game, which came to be known as the Ice Bowl because the temperature when the game began was –13 degrees Fahrenheit (–10.6 C), and only got colder as the game progressed. Dale caught three passes for 44 yards in the game. The Packers defeated the Oakland Raiders in Super Bowl II, 33–14. Dale had four receptions for 43 yards. For the third consecutive season he had the most receiving yards in the playoffs (196), and he also had the most receptions in the playoffs that season (13).

In 1968, Dale had 42 receptions for 818 yards (19.5 yards per reception) and eight receiving touchdowns. He was tied for fourth best in the NFL in yards per reception, tied for fifth in receiving touchdowns, and was eighth in total receiving yards. He was selected to play in the Pro Bowl for the first time in his career, and was named second-team All-Pro by the Newspaper Enterprise Association. The Packers finished the season 6–7–1 and did not make the playoffs. Dale had another Pro Bowl season in 1969. He led the Packers in receptions (45), receiving yards (879), and receiving touchdowns (6). He averaged 19.5 yards per reception, fourth highest in the NFL that season, and was eighth in total receiving yards.

Dale was selected to the Pro Bowl for a third consecutive season in 1970. He led the Packers in receptions (49), receiving yards (814), and yards per reception (16.6). He was 10th in the NFL in total receiving yards. His 89-yard game-winning touchdown reception against the Atlanta Falcons in the fourth quarter of a late-September game tied him with future Hall of Fame receiver Bob Hayes for the longest pass reception of the year in the NFL that season. Dale also had a 23-yard touchdown reception in the Atlanta game, and had four receptions for 186 yards overall in that game.

In 1971, he started all 14 games for the Packers, and led the team with 31 receptions and 598 receiving yards; averaging 19.3 yards per reception. He had four receiving touchdowns. He was eighth in the NFL in yards per reception. In 1972, the Packers reached the playoffs again for the first time since Super Bowl II. Dale started all 14 games but had only 16 receptions for 317 yards. The team's top two running backs, John Brockington and MacArthur Lane, rushed for over 1,800 combined yards; and the Packers had 2,127 rushing yards to 1,412 passing yards that season. Dale had two receptions for 28 yards in the 16–3 divisonal round playoff loss to the Washington Redskins.

The Packers waived Dale in mid-September 1973, before the start of the season. He was among the few remaining Packers from the Lombardi era championship teams. Packers head coach Dan Devine said at the time "It's hard to put into words what Carroll Dale has meant to the Packers . . . He has always given 100 per cent on the practice and game field". Dale was considering an offer to become an assistant coach with the Packers, when he was claimed off of waivers by the Minnesota Vikings.

In eight seasons with the Packers, Dale started 110 games, with 275 receptions for 5,422 yards and 35 touchdown receptions. In eight playoff games with the Packers, he had 29 receptions for 534 yards, averaging 18.4 yards per reception, with three receiving touchdowns. His 19.72 yards per reception ranks first all-time among all Packers' receivers (through 2025). He ranks 13th in receiving yards, 15th in receiving touchdowns, and 18th in total receptions as a Packer. Through the 2019 NFL season, Dale also held the Packers' record for most yards per reception in a game, 46.5 in a September 27, 1970 game against the Atlanta Falcons; and most yards per reception in the playoffs over a career, 18.41. He was inducted into the Green Bay Packers Hall of Fame in 1979.

=== Minnesota Vikings ===
Dale played his final NFL season with the Minnesota Vikings. He started 12 games, and had 192 yards on 14 receptions that season. The Vikings reached Super Bowl VIII, losing to the Miami Dolphins, 24–7. In the Vikings 27–20 win over the Washington Redskins in the divisional round of the playoffs, Dale had two receptions for 31 yards, the final receptions of his 14-year NFL career. The Vikings waived Dale in late April 1974 and he was claimed by the Chicago Bears, but did not play for them in 1974. Dale's career ended with him having amassed 438 receptions for 8,277 yards and 52 touchdowns and four rushes for 30 yards.

== College athletics administrator ==
In 1991, Dale left the coal mining business and was named the first full-time athletic director at Clinch Valley College (later known as the University of Virginia's College at Wise), overseeing all of the school's sports. He also worked as an athletic fundraiser for the school. Dale worked less than a mile from his childhood home, and near J. J. Kelly High School in Wise, where the school's athletic stadium had been renamed Carroll Dale Stadium in 1967. Dale headed the school's athletic department in the first year it introduced football to its athletic program; the first game being played in September 1991 at Carroll Dale Stadium. Dale provided some coaching to the team's receivers, and became an assistant to head coach Bill Ramseyer. At the time he retired, Dale was the associate vice chancellor for athletic development. The school eventually had its own field, Carl Smith Stadium, a section of which was named in Dale's honor in 2025; and it also hosts an annual golf tournament, the Carroll Dale Invitational.

== NFL career statistics ==
Legend
	Won the NFL championship
	Won the Super Bowl
	Led the league
**Bold**	Career high

=== Regular season ===
Year	Team	Games		Receiving				
Year	Team	GP	GS	Rec	Yds	Avg	Lng	TD
1960	RAM	12	3	19	336	17.7	63	3
1961	RAM	14	14	35	561	16.0	68	2
1962	RAM	14	12	29	584	20.1	80	3
1963	RAM	12	10	34	638	18.8	66	7
1964	RAM	13	10	32	544	17.0	44	2
1965	GNB	13	12	20	382	19.1	77	2
1966	GNB	14	13	37	876	**23.7**	83	7
1967	GNB	14	14	35	738	21.1	86	5
1968	GNB	14	14	42	818	19.5	63	**8**
1969	GNB	14	14	45	**879**	19.5	48	6
1970	GNB	14	14	**49**	814	16.6	**89**	2
1971	GNB	14	14	31	598	19.3	77	4
1972	GNB	14	14	16	317	19.8	48	1
1973	MIN	13	12	14	192	13.7	40	0
Career		189	170	438	8,277	18.9	89	52

=== Playoffs ===
Year	Team	Games		Receiving				
Year	Team	GP	GS	Rec	Yds	Avg	Lng	TD
1965	GNB	2	2	5	123	**24.6**	47	**1**
1966	GNB	2	2	9	187	20.8	**51**	**1**
1967	GNB	3	3	**13**	**196**	15.1	48	**1**
1972	GNB	1	1	2	28	14.0	15	0
1973	MIN	3	3	2	31	15.5	16	0
Career		11	11	31	565	18.2	51	3

== Legacy and honors ==
Dale was inducted into the Virginia Sports Hall of Fame (the state-wide organization that recognizes athletic achievements by state natives, or who played or coached for teams in the state) in 1976, Green Bay Packers Hall of Fame in 1979 and into the College Football Hall of Fame in 1987. He has been selected to the Southern Conference's 100th Anniversary Team. His number (84) was retired by Virginia Tech. In 1982, Dale was in the inaugural class of inductees to the Virginia Tech Sports Hall of Fame. Dale was the first Virginia Tech player to be selected an All-American, and was the first Hokie to play in a Super Bowl. In 1959, he received the H. Lehigh Williams Memorial Trophy from the Norfolk Sports Club as Virginia's most valuable player.

In late April 1967, the city of Wise honored Dale with various events over a two-day period (such as a banquet, parade, and placement of commemorative markers), culminating in the renaming of the football stadium of Dale's alma mater, J. J. Kelly High School, to Carroll Dale Stadium. Dale's Viriginia Tech head coach Frank Moseley spoke at a banquet for Dale, and observed that Dale "exerted an influence at Virginia Tech that has been of lasting value". The speakers included, among others, Wise mayor Carl W. Hamilton.

In 2006, Virginia’s General Assembly adopted a resolution commending Dale for “his valuable service to Southwest Virginia and the Commonwealth” of Virginia.

== Personal life ==
Dale has worked closely with the Fellowship of Christian Athletes. While living in Bristol, Tennessee after his playing career, he was president of Sunshine Inc., a strip mining company in Virginia, before becoming an athletic director in 1991. He had been in the coal mining business for 17 years.

Dale currently resides in his birthplace, Wise, Virginia.
