= Lonesome Pine District =

The Lonesome Pine District was a high school conference of the Virginia High School League which draws its members from the western part of Southwest Virginia. The district's name comes from The Trail of the Lonesome Pine. The district dissolved in 2015.

== Member schools ==
School	Team	Location	Colors
Clintwood	Greenwave	Clintwood, VA	
John I. Burton	Raiders	Norton, VA	
Central	Warriors	Wise, VA	
Union	Bears	Big Stone Gap, VA	
