= Glenn Roberts (basketball) =

American basketball player (1912–1980)

Personal information
- Born: October 25, 1912 Pound, Virginia, U.S.
- Died: May 21, 1980 (aged 67) Kingsport, Tennessee, U.S.
- Listed height: 6 ft 4 in (1.93 m)
- Listed weight: 198 lb (90 kg)

Career information
- High school: Pound (Pound, Virginia)
- College: Emory and Henry (1931–1935)
- Playing career: 1937–1942
- Position: Power forward / center

Career history
- 1937–1938: Dayton Metropolitans
- 1938–1939: Akron Firestone Non-Skids
- 1941–1942: Toledo Jim White Chevrolets

Career highlights
- NBL champion (1939); First-team All-American – Helms (1935)

Glenn Roberts (October 25, 1912 – May 21, 1980) was an American National Basketball League player. In college basketball, Roberts was one of the first players to put the "jump shot" to practical use.

== Overview ==
Glenn Roberts' Pound, Virginia high school did not field a basketball team his first two high school years. Roberts’ team won the state championship his junior and senior years (1930 & 31). The team record for 1930 was 28 wins and 2 losses with 1931 being 35 wins and 0 losses. Roberts was designated captain of the All-State team both years. Roberts played varsity ball 4 years (1931–35) at Emory & Henry College scoring 2,013 points in 104 games for a per game average of 19.4 points in an era when team scores were seldom over 30 or 35 points per game. His scoring was a new record for that time and still stands for play prior to the 1937 revision of the center-jump rule which called for walking the ball back to the center-line after every basket made and with the clock still running. (It's been estimated that this used up 8 to 10 minutes per game.) Roberts scored 1,531 points against college opposition in 80 games and 482 points against pro and semi-pro teams in 24 games. Emory and Henry's overall team record was 90 wins and 14 losses. His scoring total and per-game average was featured in Ripleys’ "Believe it or Not" in 1936.

One significant reason for Glenn Roberts’ prolific scoring was his use of a jump-shot. Historian and writer Stephen Fox, in his book Big Leagues, contends, after exhaustive research, that Glenn Roberts was the very first college player to utilize a jump-shot to such a scoring advantage. It was an offensive weapon the opposition had never seen before.

In the 1930s there did not exist the well defined college conferences as today. Consequently, smaller schools like Emory & Henry were as likely to play the largest of schools as well as the smaller ones. Emory & Henry regularly played the University of Richmond, Virginia Tech, University of Tennessee, William & Mary, East Tennessee State, George Washington, University of Virginia etc.

A game against the much larger University of Richmond Spiders is significant. The only team to have an undefeated season, in the history of Virginia college basketball, was the 1934-35 Richmond team. Richmond's late coach, Malcolm (Mac) Pitt, in a letter to the Naismith Memorial Basketball Hall of Fame, describes how Richmond, in its final game of the season, narrowly edged Emory and Henry with their defensive efforts being focused primarily on Roberts. Richmond defeated Emory and Henry, IN OVERTIME, on Richmond's home court in an era when officiating was far less than the high caliber profession it is today. The "home court" was generally considered a 4 or 5 point advantage for the home team.

Upon graduating, Glenn Roberts received many professional offers from National Basketball League (NBL) and other professional teams, but opted for coaching basketball at Norton High in Norton, Virginia. He turned the program around and won the district championship in the two years he coached – 1936 and 1937 seasons. He was induced by the Firestone Non-Skids of the NBL to play for the 1938–39 season. The Firestone team had four All-Americans including Glenn Roberts – Art Bonniwell of Dartmouth and John Moir and Paul Nowak, both from Notre Dame. Firestone won the NBL Eastern Division championship with a 24 and 3 season record. They then won the NBL Championship by beating the Western Division champions (Oshkosh All-Stars) in a best of 5 series. Their .875 winning percentage for the regular season is the highest winning percentage in the history of the NBL and the NBA (National Basketball Association). Ironically, the standout player on the team was a non-collegian, "Soup" Cable, a local Akronite, who averaged 10 points with the other scoring being fairly evenly distributed in the 3 to 6 point range. Glen Roberts played little basketball in the two years after college, yet was able to make a significant contribution to the Firestone teams’ outstanding season. Roberts, knowing that basketball wasn't going to be his life's career, took advantage of a job opportunity with Firestone after the one spectacular season.

Glenn Roberts and his six brothers (five of whom were Virginia high school all-state) fielded a team and dominated the Northeast Ohio industrial leagues during the early 1940s. Roberts and his brothers took a leave of absence from Firestone in January 1945 to sell war-bonds by barnstorming Virginia, Kentucky, Tennessee, North Carolina and West Virginia where Glenn Roberts' name was still legend. Their opposition was colleges, pro and semi-pro teams. (On March 10, 1945, $50,000.00 was raised in a victory over Milligan College.)

Five of the seven brothers were exempted from military service during the World War II years because their Firestone jobs were critical to the war effort. The other two did a tour of duty in the navy and army respectively.

Play with his brothers in the mid-1940s was the end of Glenn Roberts’ involvement with basketball with the exception of two years in the 1960s. He coached Clinch Valley College of the University of Virginia for two seasons – 1964 through 1966. The team record for the season prior to his arrival was 2 wins and 19 losses. Roberts’ record was 14 wins and 6 losses each of the two years he coached. Until Roberts’ college coaching debut the school had never known a winning season.

== Jump shot ==
Shooting a jump shot, c. 1941.

Basketball writers and historians have debated where, when and from whom the jump shot came. The consensus conclusion is that no one knows for sure. The first basketball "jump" shot could have been executed in 1918, or any year, by any John Doe in Any Town, U.S.A. The more important consideration is, who was the first in organized basketball to put to use a "jump" style shot with the result being “increased scoring” for that individual, assuming it was an asset to the team?

In college basketball, the undisputed first player(s) to put a jump shot to practical use, were Glenn Roberts of Emory and Henry College and John M Cooper of the University of Missouri. Again, noted historian and writer, Stephen Fox, in his 1994 book, “Big Leagues,” shows that Roberts and Cooper both used a jumper simultaneously in time (early 1930s) and yet totally independent of each other. Both shot a two handed jumper. The greatest difference between the two was their scoring averages. While Cooper's 11 plus point average was considered great in that era of low scoring games, it paled in comparison to Roberts’ 19 plus average.

Roberts’ high school did not have an indoor gym and therefore had to practice on an outdoor dirt court. Often when the ground was too muddy for dribbling, the players would just pass to each other and shoot when someone was open. Roberts, even when guarded closely, started jumping in the air, with ball in hand, and released the ball at the apex of his jump.

It wasn't until a decade or so later that the "jump shot" started to become more widely used. Four players to be credited with popularizing the jumper in the mid-to-late 1940s were Bud Palmer, Belus Smawley, Kenny Sailors and Joe Fulks.

== Basketball observations ==
First commercial drawing of Charles Schulz (of Peanuts fame). (c.1936)

Glenn Roberts' high school and college scoring was considered by many nothing short of spectacular. Compared to today, record keeping in the 1930s was very lacking and it is therefore impossible to give an accurate accounting of his high school scoring totals. Testimony from former high school teammates, via letters submitted to the Naismith Memorial Basketball Hall of Fame, indicate that Roberts’ high school scoring was well in excess of a 20-point average. Many considered his college scoring as truly “unbelievable” as Ripleys’ "Believe it or Not" feature indicated. His 2,013 point total stood unmatched until 1949 when Loyola's Steve Lacey exceeded 2,000 points.

The closest that any college player, prior to 1935, had come to Glenn Roberts’ 19 plus per game average was “Hall of Fame” great and 1930 Montana State graduate, John "Cat" Thompson, with a 15 plus per game average. Nineteen of the 100 games Thompson's team played during his four years was against non-college opponents, with Montana State averaging 77 points per game and winning each game. (Example: Montana State beat Havre All-Stars 110 to 10). It is therefore obvious that Thompson averaged significantly less than 15 points against bona-fide college teams.

=== Glenn Roberts' and Hank Luisetti's records ===
In 1938, newspapers throughout the South announced that Stanford's great “Hall of Famer," Hank Luisetti, voted 2nd greatest player of the first half century, had broken Glenn Roberts’ scoring record. They stated that Luisetti had scored 1,596 points in four years as opposed to Roberts’ 1,531 points. What was overlooked by the press was that 305 of Luisetti's points were scored in 15 games as a freshman against college freshmen and high school teams. It was also in his freshman year that Luisetti attained his highest average (20.3) of any of his four years at Stanford. Also, Hank Luisetti played in 95 games (compared to Roberts' 80 games) in accumulating his 1,596 points for an overall per game average of 16.8 points.

In a letter dated April 27, 1979 and addressed to Carroll Tate of the "Coalfied Progress," Stanford University's “Sports Information Director,” Bob Rose, confirms that Luisetti's scoring total was 1,291 points in 80 games for a 16.1 per game average (sophomore, junior and senior years).

Glenn Roberts played all 80 games against varsity college competition, including 18 games as a freshman. During his freshman year, Roberts scored 292 points for an average of 16.2 points per game.

Note the following comparison chart summarizing Roberts’ and Luisetti's college statistics for games played against college teams.

Glenn Roberts

Year	Games	Total Scored	Ave. per game
1932	18	292	16.2
1933	18	403	22.4
1934	21	415	19.8
1935	23	421	18.3
Totals	80	1,531	19.1

(Played an additional 24 games against non-college professional and semi-pro teams scoring an additional 482 points for a 2,013 point total in 104 games and an overall 19.4 average.)

Hank Luisetti

Year	Games	Total Scored	Ave. per game
1935_{1}	15	305	20.3
1936	29	416	14.3
1937	24	410	17.0
1938_{2}	27	465	17.2
Totals	95_{3}	1,596	16.8
Varsity Games	80	1,291	16.1

_{1} Played on Stanford's freshman team against other college freshman teams and high school teams.

_{2} Played during first year of “new rule” which eliminated the “center jump” after every basket. This rule change resulted in an estimated additional 8 to 12 minutes of playing time and higher game scores.

_{3} Played one game each of last three years against the "Olympic Club," a non-college team with Stanford winning all 3 games.

There are several glaring similarities between Roberts’ and Luisetti's basketball careers. First, both used a revolutionary new shot that accounted for each players’ accelerated scoring – Roberts with a two-handed jump shot and Luisetti with a one-handed running shot. Secondly, the team records for Emory and Henry and Stanford were 68-12 during Roberts’ and Luisetti's 80 varsity games played against other colleges and universities. Thirdly, Roberts and Luisetti each scored fifty points in a game – Roberts against the "House of David," a non-college team. (Roberts scored 38 points in a college game against Union College of Kentucky Luisetti's 50 point performance was against Duquesne University of Pennsylvania. Lastly, both Roberts and Luisetti enjoyed a limited post-college professional basketball career.

Luisetti's rise to national prominence was generated by Stanford's good fortune in being invited by Ned Irish to play in Madison Square Garden. After barnstorming across the country playing to capacity crowds in big cities like Cleveland and Philadelphia, Stanford concluded their tour by playing Long Island University (LIU) on December 30, 1936. LIU had won 43 straight games, but was whipped by Stanford as Luisetti had a great night scoring 15 points.

One can only conjecture the result had Emory and Henry and Glenn Roberts been invited by Ned Irish to play in Madison Square Garden. Would the opposing teams have been able to adjust to and defend the unorthodox and likely never-before-seen two handed jump shot of Glenn Roberts? On the other hand, how well would Luisetti's exploits have been remembered had Stanford not made their cross-country trip culminating in the LIU game where he was in the cross-hairs of the powerful Northeast press.

A comparison of Roberts’ and Luisetti's playing abilities is not the intent here, nor is it an attempt to detract from Luisetti's greatness. It is intended, rather, to use Luisetti's great accomplishments as a mirror for Glen Roberts’ individual basketball accomplishments.

Record keeping was also limited in college games of the 1930s and therefore records for field goal percentages, foul shooting percentages, assists etc. were non-existent.

Letters from Emory and Henry teammates Sam Neal, Walter Fielder and Paul Mackey, on file at the Naismith Memorial Basketball Hall of Fame, indicate that Roberts field goal percentage was well in excess of 50 per cent. They further state that he rarely missed a foul shot. They also attested to his strong defensive play.

Roberts, in a 1975 interview with Abe Goldblatt for his book, "The Great and the Near Great: A Century of Sports in Virginia," stated that he "took every defensive assignment as a personal challenge to hold my opponent to as few points as possible."

Also, in a letter on file at the Basketball Hall of Fame, Firestone teammate Irv Terjesen testifies to Roberts' all around play.

=== Basketball Hall of Fame ===
There are many people, especially Southerners, who think Glenn Roberts should be in the Naismith Memorial Basketball Hall of Fame. The game of basketball in the 1920s and 1930s did not enjoy the national focus of today. It was more provincial in focus and coverage. The only possible national focus was on what would be considered the basketball power structure of the day, the New England and New York City/New Jersey area.

Supporting this is the fact that all players, from Glenn Roberts' era, inducted into the Hall of Fame are from the Northeast with a few from the Mid-West and, of course, Luisetti from California. As already pointed out, Luisetti had a chance to show his stuff in New York City.

The geography that Glenn Roberts covered during his college days was definitely void of national focus and attention. This fact does not, however, make Glenn Roberts exploits and contributions to the game any less real or significant. It would be presumptuous and erroneous to conclude that Glenn Roberts' caliber of play was inferior because he was never in the crosshairs of the powerful Northeast press. There is no player in the Hall of Fame from Roberts' era whose accomplishments come remotely close to Roberts' scoring achievements and all-around play.

== Personal life ==
No one knows for sure whether Glenn should be spelled with one or two n's; it's been done equally both ways throughout his life.

Children in those agrarian days were viewed as workhands as soon as they were old enough for a hoe to fit their hands. The average summer day on South Fork, located five miles (8 km) from Pound, Virginia, began before dawn with breakfast followed by hoeing, mowing and whatever else was needed on their farm that produced corn, potatoes and the ancillary crops needed for food. A few cows, hogs and many chickens rounded out their food sources.

Even though they could have been used full-time on the farm, Mommy Roberts vowed her boys were going to get an education even if they had to walk to school; and walk they did. Glenn Roberts started his five-mile (8 km) trek before daylight with lantern in hand, leaving the lantern on the same barn each morning. There was always time for basketball each day before and after school.

Roberts graduated from Emory and Henry College in 1935, where he was in the social fraternity Beta Lambda Zeta. Rather than take one of the many offers to play professional basketball, Glenn opted to coach and teach at Norton High School for two years. Immediately after college he married Helen Joyce Keys and had three children, Glenn Jr., Mary Virginia and Larry Van.

After playing one year of professional basketball with Firestone (1938–39), he went to work full-time for Firestone where he enjoyed a successful career, working his way up to being head of Firestone's "Time Study" Department. In 1963 he resigned from Firestone to join his son, Glenn Jr. in their new tire business in Norton, Virginia.

At the time of his death, this business and the eleven others in Southwest Virginia, Eastern Kentucky and East Tennessee had become the third largest Firestone dealer in the country and the largest consumer of Firestone retread rubber in the country.

Roberts developed colon cancer in 1978 and succumbed to it in 1980.
