= Carl Smith Stadium =

Stadium in Wise, Virginia, US

Coordinates: 36.974898°N 82.564369°W

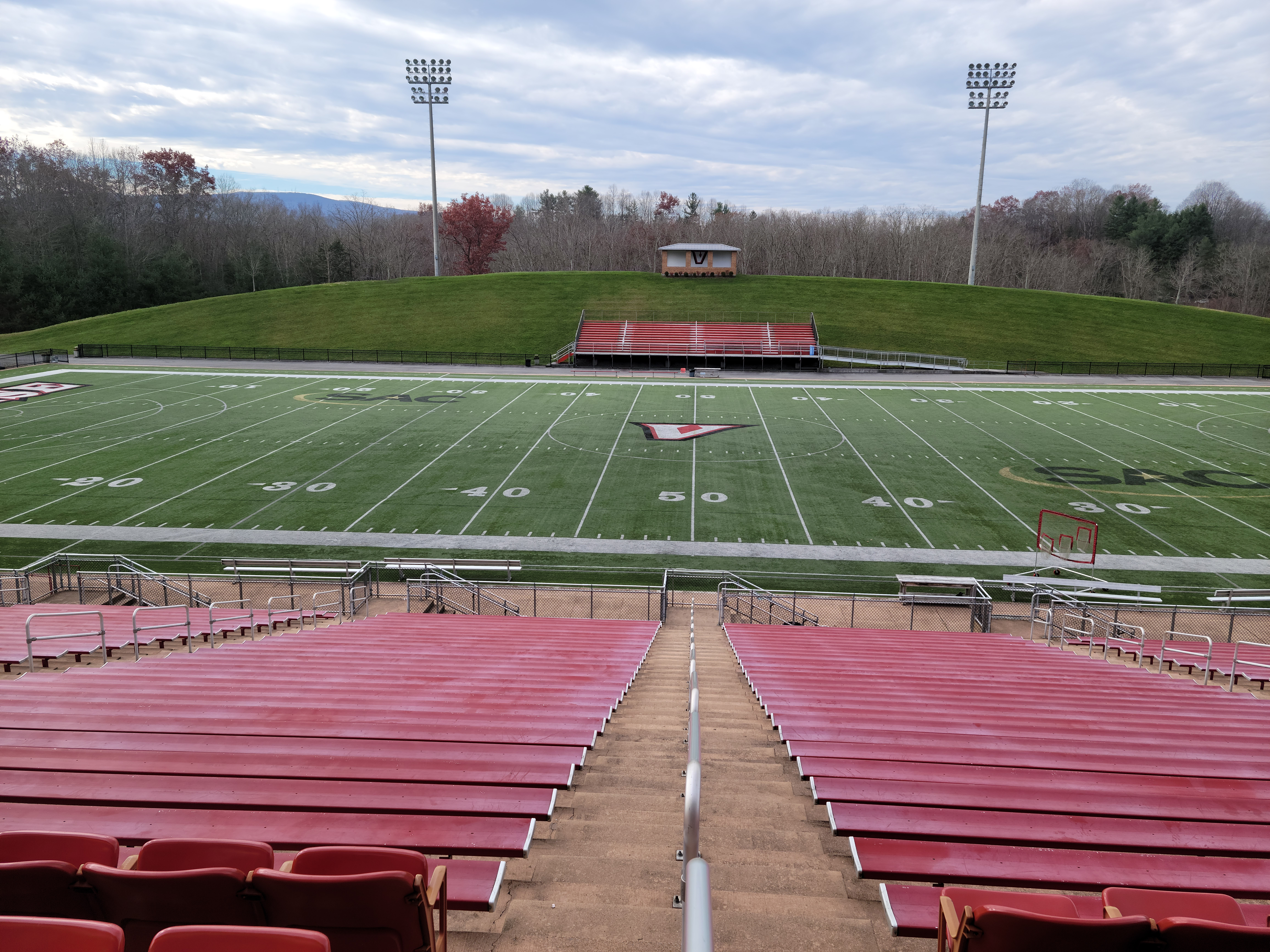
- View of the stadium in 2020
- Interactive map of Carl Smith Stadium
- Full name: Beaty–Richmond Field at Carl Smith Stadium
- Address: Wise, Va; U.S.
- Owner: UVA Wise
- Operator: UVA Wise Cavaliers
- Capacity: 3,086
- Type: Stadium
- Surface: Artificial turf
- Current use: American football

Construction
- Opened: 1999; 27 years ago

Tenants
- UVA Wise Cavaliers teams: football, lacrosse

Website
- uvawisecavs.com/stadium

Beaty–Richmond Field at Carl Smith Stadium is a 3,086-capacity stadium in Wise, Virginia, used mostly by the UVA Wise Cavaliers football and women's lacrosse teams.

The stadium is named for Carl Smith, a Wise native who donated large sums of money to the university system, and the field is named for Lelia Maude Beaty Richmond, another Wise native who was a supporter of the school.
