= Norton City Schools =

Norton City Schools may refer to:

- Norton City Schools (Ohio)
- Norton City Schools (Virginia)
