= J. J. Kelly High School =

Location
- 716 Birchfield Road; Wise, Virginia 24293
- 36°59′8″N 82°34′36.68″W

Information
- School type: Public, high school
- Founded: 1953
- Closed: 2011
- School district: Wise County Public Schools
- Grades: 9–12
- Enrollment: 473 (2009)
- Language: English
- Colors: Red and White
- Mascot: Indian
- Feeder schools: L. F. Addington Middle School
- Athletic conferences: Lonesome Pine District

J. J. Kelly High School is a former public high school in Wise, Virginia. The school was opened in 1953. It was part of the Wise County Public Schools system. It was named after a former county school board superintendent, Dr. J. J. Kelly, Jr. The enrollment in 2005 was 504 students and employed 41 teachers. The mascot for J. J. Kelly High School was the Indian. The school's colors were red and white. The Indians competed in the Virginia High School League's Single A Lonesome Pine District with five other schools from around Southwest Virginia. J. J. Kelly High School was merged with Pound High School in 2011 to form Central High School, which is now located in a new facility outside of Wise.

== Athletics ==
=== State Championships (won) ===
- Baseball - 1981, 1982, 1983, 1984, 1988, 1989, 1991, 1998, 2008
- Basketball (Girls) - 2002
- Cross County (Boys) - 1988
- Football - 1981
- Golf - 2003
- Tennis (Girls) - 1986, 1991, 1992, 1993, 1994, 1995, 1996, 1997
- Theatre - 2007
- Wrestling - 1983, 1988

=== Records ===
J. J. Kelly still holds the Virginia High School League record for most state championships won by any school in baseball and girls tennis. The girls tennis program also holds the record for most consecutive state titles, having won seven, and consecutive team matches won, with a record of 128–0. The state record for most consecutive baseball championships is also held by the Indians, as they won four from 1981 to 1984.

== Notable alumni ==
- Carroll Dale - Former Los Angeles Rams and Green Bay Packers receiver and Virginia Sports Hall of Fame inductee
