= TSHS =

TSHS may refer to

- The Seven Hills School, Cincinnati, Ohio, United States
- Tahoma Senior High School, Covington, Washington, United States
- Tarpon Springs High School, Pinellas County, Florida, United States
- Terry Sanford High School, Fayetteville, North Carolina, United States
- Thomas Stone High School, Waldorf, Maryland, United States
- Toowoomba State High School, Toowoomba, Queensland, Australia
- Twin Springs High School, Nickelsville, Virginia, United States
- Tesla STEM High School, Redmond, Washington, United States
- Townsville State High School, Townsville, Queensland, Australia
