= James Mitchell (American football) =

American football player (born 1999)

No. 84 – Dallas Cowboys
- Position: Tight end
- Roster status: Active

Personal information
- Born: August 11, 1999 (age 27); Big Stone Gap, Virginia, U.S.
- Listed height: 6 ft 4 in (1.93 m)
- Listed weight: 249 lb (113 kg)

Career information
- High school: Union (Big Stone Gap)
- College: Virginia Tech (2018–2021)
- NFL draft: 2022: 5th round, 177th overall pick

Career history
- Detroit Lions (2022–2024); Carolina Panthers (2025); Dallas Cowboys (2026–present)

Career NFL statistics as of 2025
- Receptions: 16
- Receiving yards: 169
- Receiving touchdowns: 1
- Stats at Pro Football Reference

James Maxell Mitchell (born August 11, 1999), nicknamed "the Governor", is an American professional football tight end for the Dallas Cowboys of the National Football League (NFL). He played college football for the Virginia Tech Hokies.

== Early life ==
James Mitchell was born August 11, 1999, to Jimmy and Marcia Mitchell. Mitchell's father is a pastor and his mother played college basketball Brown University. Mitchell's father appeared in Big Stone Gap, a film about Mitchell's hometown. Mitchell grew up in Big Stone Gap, Virginia and attended Union High School where he was a stand out athlete in multiple sports. Mitchell's athleticism was noticed at an early age when he began dunking the ball in middle school while playing JV basketball. He committed to play college football for Virginia Tech over offers from Georgia, Duke and Clemson.

== College career ==
Mitchell played in 13 games, primarily on special teams, as a freshman. He became a starter as a sophomore and caught 21 passes for 361 yards with two touchdowns. Mitchell had 26 receptions for 435 yards and four touchdowns as a junior. He was nicknamed "the Governor" during his junior season by his coaching staff and teammates. Mitchell considered entering the 2021 NFL draft, but opted to stay at Virginia Tech for his senior season. Mitchell was named to the Pre-season All-Atlantic Coast Conference team prior to his senior year and was on the Mackey Award watch list. Mitchell suffered a season-ending injury in the second game of his senior year. Following the end of the season, he announced that he would be entering the 2022 NFL draft.

== Professional career ==
Pre-draft measurables
Height	Weight	Arm length	Hand span	Wingspan	Bench press
6 ft 4 in (1.93 m)	249 lb (113 kg)	32 7/8 in (0.84 m)	9 3/4 in (0.25 m)	6 ft 5 3/4 in (1.97 m)	18 reps
All values from NFL Combine/Pro Day

=== Detroit Lions ===
Mitchell was selected in the fifth round with the 177th overall pick of the 2022 NFL Draft by the Detroit Lions. During Week 8 against the Miami Dolphins, Mitchell recorded his first NFL catch on a 14–yard reception from Jared Goff. On November 6, Mitchell recorded his first NFL touchdown on a three-yard reception against the Green Bay Packers at Ford Field. As a rookie, Mitchell appeared in 14 games. He recorded 11 receptions for 113 receiving yards and one touchdown.

Mitchell was waived by the Lions on August 27, 2024, and re-signed to the practice squad.

=== Carolina Panthers ===
On January 21, 2025, Mitchell signed a reserve/future contract with the Carolina Panthers.

On March 16, 2026, Mitchell re-signed with the Panthers on a one-year contract. He was released by Carolina on August 30 as a part of final roster cuts.

=== Dallas Cowboys ===
On September 3, 2026, Mitchell was signed to the Dallas Cowboys' practice squad. In his first game with the Cowboys, he scored a touchdown on a fumble recovery. He was signed to the active roster on November 14.
