= Cumberland District (VHSL) =

The Cumberland District is a high school conference of the Virginia High School League which draws its members from the western part of Southwest Virginia. The schools in the Cumberland District compete in Region 1D with the schools of the Black Diamond District and the Hogoheegee District.

In the 2013 VHSL realignment, the members of the Cumberland District also comprise Conference 48 for the first round of post-season competition. The Cumberland District is one of only two districts whose members also solely comprise a conference.

== Member schools ==
School	Location	Mascot	Colors	2022-23 9–12 enrollment
Castlewood High School	Castlewood	Blue Devils		382
Eastside High School	Coeburn	Spartans		279
John I. Burton High School	Norton	Raiders		320
Rye Cove High School	Clinchport	Eagles		160
Thomas Walker High School	Ewing	Pioneers		171
Twin Springs High School	Nickelsville	Titans		244

== Former Member Schools -- Closed ==
- Jonesville High School of Jonesville, Virginia
- Pennington High School of Pennington Gap, Virginia
- Flatwoods High School of Jonesville, Virginia
- Dryden High School of Dryden, Virginia
- Keokee High School of Keokee, Virginia
- Saint Paul High School (Virginia) of Saint Paul, Virginia
- Coeburn High School of Coeburn, Virginia
- Ervinton High School of Nora, Virginia
- Clintwood High School of Clintwood, Virginia
