= Colonial Hotel (Wise, Virginia) =

Historic hotel in Virginia, US

- U.S. National Register of Historic Places
- Virginia Landmarks Register
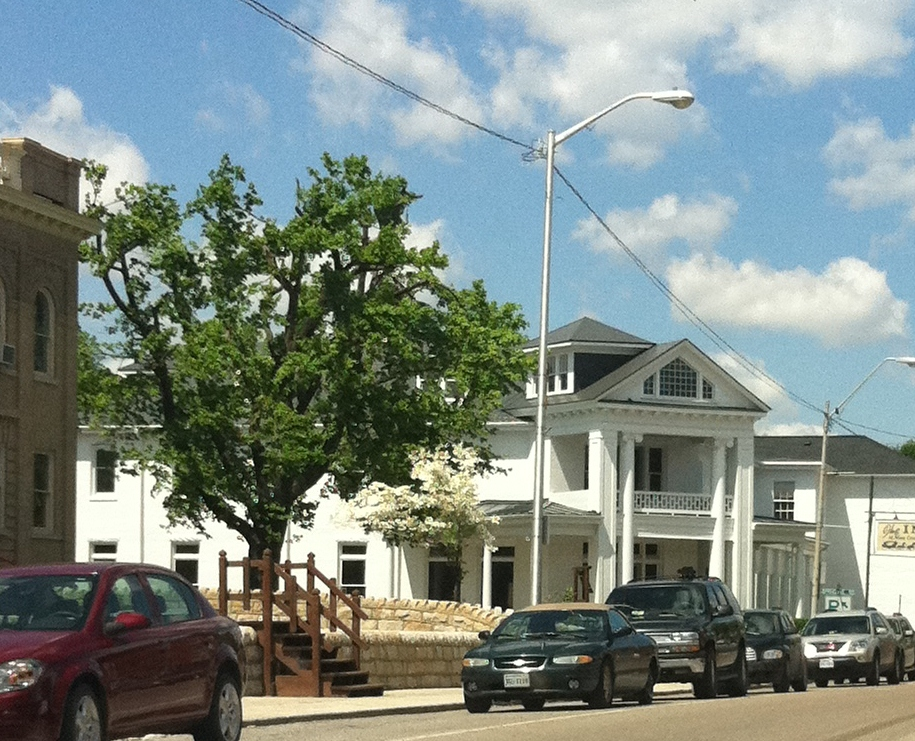

- Location within Virginia Location within the United States
- Location: Jct. of Main and Spring Sts., Wise, Virginia
- Coordinates: 36°58′39″N 82°34′51″W
- Area: less than one acre
- Built: 1910
- Architect: Phipps, D.J.
- Architectural style: Colonial Revival
- NRHP reference No.: 91000019
- VLR No.: 329-0002

Significant dates
- Added to NRHP: February 5, 1991
- Designated VLR: December 11, 1990

Colonial Hotel, also known as Inn at Wise Courthouse, is a historic hotel building located in Wise, Wise County, Virginia. It was built in 1910, and is a 2 1/2-story, roughly U-shaped building with a hipped roof. It is constructed of brick, painted white, and is in the Colonial Revival style. It features an angled entrance sheltered by a pedimented colossal Ionic order portico with paired round columns flanked by paneled square columns.

It was listed on the National Register of Historic Places in 1991.

== See also ==
- National Register of Historic Places listings in Wise County, Virginia
