= Wise County Courthouse (Virginia) =

- U.S. National Register of Historic Places
- Virginia Landmarks Register
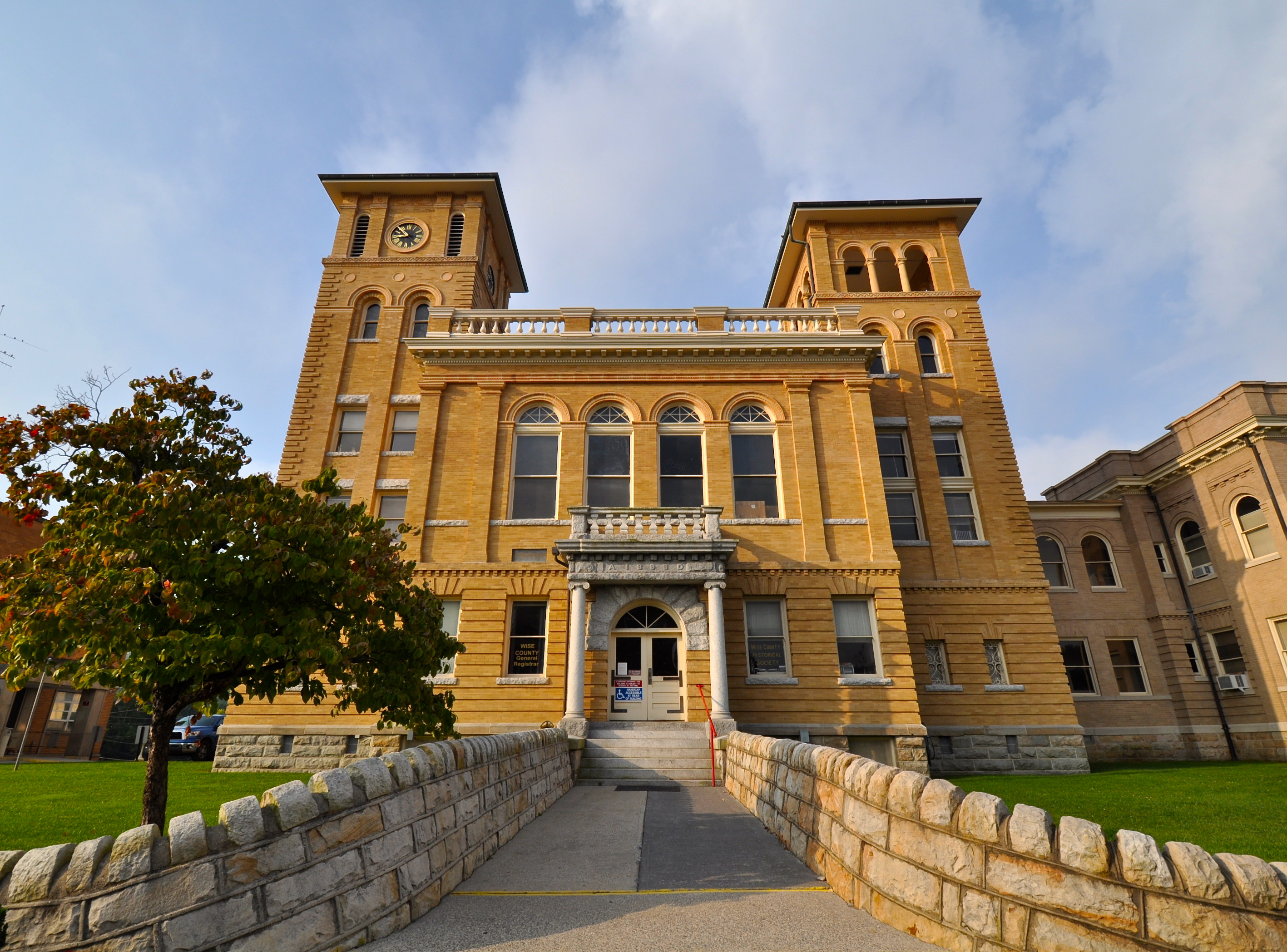
- Wise County Courthouse

- Location within Virginia Location within the United States
- Interactive map showing the location of Wise County Courthouse
- Location: VA 640, Wise, Virginia
- Coordinates: 36°58′36″N 82°34′47″W
- Area: 1 acre (0.40 ha)
- Built: 1896
- Architect: Frank P. Milburn; Gilliam & Flanary
- Architectural style: Renaissance
- NRHP reference No.: 81000649
- VLR No.: 329-0001

Significant dates
- Added to NRHP: March 2, 1981
- Designated VLR: October 21, 1980

The Wise County Courthouse is located at 206 East Main Street in downtown Wise, Virginia. As well as being home to Wise County's judicial system, it also serves as the chief administrative building for the county. It was built in 1896 to replace a much smaller court building. The original courthouse was completed in 1858, two years after the formation of Wise County, but was destroyed by Union troops during the Civil War in 1864. The current courthouse was built in the Renaissance Revival style in 1896, designed by Frank P. Millburn.

It was listed on the National Register of Historic Places in 1981.

== See also ==
- National Register of Historic Places listings in Wise County, Virginia
