= Eastside High School (Coeburn, Virginia) =

Location
- 314 School House Hill Dr; Coeburn, Virginia; Southwest Virginia; Coeburn, Wise County, Virginia 24230; United States
- Coordinates: 36.9459°N 82.4688°W

Information
- School type: Public, high school
- Status: Open
- School district: Wise County Public Schools
- NCES District ID: 510408001786
- Grades: 9–12
- Athletics conference: VHSL Class 1 VHSL Region D VHSL Cumberland District
- Mascot: Spartans
- Website: https://www.wisek12.org/o/ehs
- Last updated: January 24, 2024

Eastside High School is a public high school located in Coeburn, Virginia. It is a part of the Wise County Public Schools district, and as of the 2021–2022 school year, there was 384 students enrolled. The school opened in August 2011 at the former Coeburn High School due to the consolidation of Coeburn High School and St. Paul High School. In August 2013, the school relocated to a new facility.
