= E. M. Fulton House =

Historic house in Virginia, United States

- U.S. National Register of Historic Places
- Virginia Landmarks Register
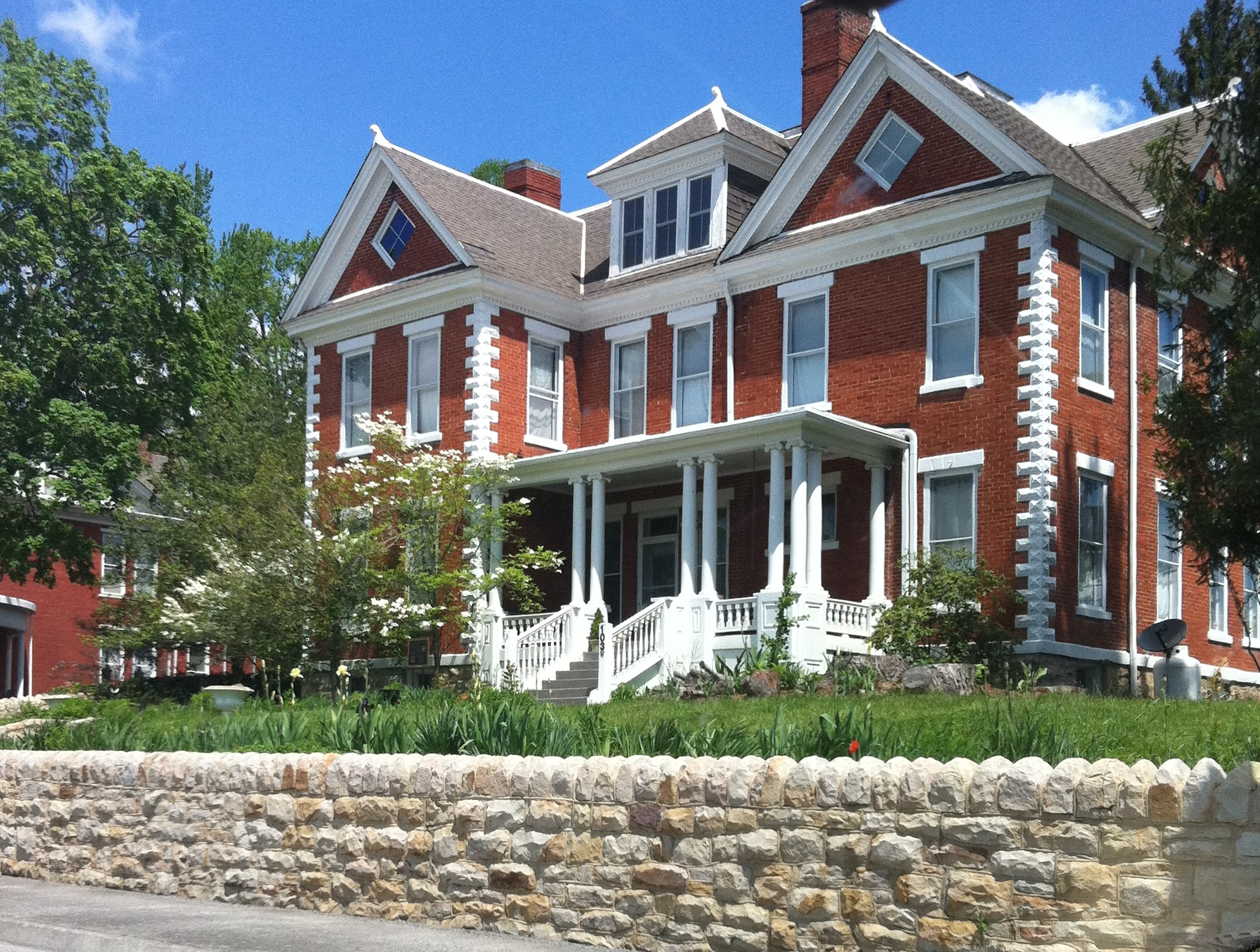

- Location within Virginia Location within the United States
- Location: 103 W. Main Street, Wise, Virginia
- Coordinates: 36°58′48″N 82°34′50″W
- Area: less than one acre
- Built: 1905–1906
- Architectural style: Queen Anne, Colonial Revival
- NRHP reference No.: 05001581
- VLR No.: 329-0004-0001

Significant dates
- Added to NRHP: February 1, 2006
- Designated VLR: December 7, 2005

The E. M. Fulton House, also known as Glay Williams House and Vernoy Tate House, is a historic home in Wise, Wise County, Virginia. It was built in 1905–1906 and is a 2½-story, six-bay, Colonial Revival style frame dwelling clad in a red brick veneer. It sits on a sandstone foundation and has a hipped and gable roof with dormers. The front façade features a one-story, three-bay porch with paired Doric order columns.

It was listed on the National Register of Historic Places in 2005.

== See also ==
- National Register of Historic Places listings in Wise County, Virginia
