= Wise County Christian School =

Location
- Wise, Virginia; United States
- Coordinates: 36°58′4.1″N 82°33′1.8″W

Information
- Principal: Eddie Mullins
- Colors: Blue and Green
- Athletics: Basketball, Tennis, and Volleyball
- Mascot: Eagles
- Rival: Gate City Christian School
- Website: wisecountychristianschool.com

Wise County Christian School is a school in Wise, Virginia. Its mascot is the eagle.
