= John I. Burton High School =

Location
- 109 11th St; Norton, Virginia 24273; United States
- Coordinates: 36°55′47.4″N 82°38′2.7″W

Information
- School type: Public, high school
- Founded: 1953
- School district: Norton City Schools
- Superintendent: Gina Wohlford
- Principal: Brad Hart
- Grades: 8-12
- Enrollment: 320 (2020)
- Language: English
- Colors: Orange and black
- Athletics: Basketball, football, baseball, wrestling, volleyball, tennis, cross country, softball, track, cheerleading, golf, marching band
- Athletics conference: VHSL Class 1 VHSL Region D VHSL Cumberland District
- Mascot: Raiders
- Rival: Central High School (Wise, Virginia), Union High School and Eastside High School
- Feeder schools: Norton Elementary and Middle School
- Website: Official site

John Ira Burton High School is a high school located in the City of Norton, Virginia, United States. A part of Norton City Schools, it has an enrollment of approximately 320 students.

== Building ==
The school was built in 1953 and named in honor of John Ira Burton, who served as principal of the local schools for 38 years. It has a classroom capacity of 615 students.

In 2008, major structural enhancements were made on the Lawson-Fitchko Stadium. They were completed on August 22 for the Raiders' first home football game of the season, against Rye Cove High School.

On September 18, 2008, the school dedicated the Rickie M. Harris Athletic Complex. The facility was named in honor of Rickie M. Harris, a former student and school athlete who died five years prior as a result of an auto accident.

== Athletics ==
The Raider football team competed in the Virginia state finals three times between 2003 and 2006 and won the state title in 1972. In the 2006 state finals the Raiders came close to a second state title, finishing with a score of 21-20 against the Riverheads Gladiators from Staunton, Virginia.

The school's marching band competes in several regional competitions and the band performed at the halftime performance for the 2017 Sugar Bowl in New Orleans, Louisiana.

In March 2011, the school's Lady Raider Basketball team won its first state championship, defeating Sussex Central 65-54 in the VHSL Group A, Division 1 final.

John I. Burton wrestler Colby Dean became a four-time VHSL A State Champion from 2010 to 2013, becoming at the time just the third wrestler in Group A history to win four state championships.

== Academics ==
In 2018, the school had a dropout percentage of 0.81%. In that same year, 70% of the school's graduating class enrolled in a postsecondary Institution of Higher Education (IHE) within sixteen months of graduating. In the 2010–2011 school year, John I. Burton was in one of only four school divisions in the state that made AYP (average yearly progress) as set by guidelines in the No Child Left Behind Act of 2002, a former national education mandate.
