= Jonesville High School =

High school in Virginia, United States

Jonesville High School was a public high school located in Jonesville, Virginia.

== History ==
Jonesville High School had an enrollment of around 450 student in grades 7-12. The school was closed in the summer of 1989 and converted to a middle school due to consolidation. Lee High School was formed from the consolidation.

== Extracurricular activities ==
=== Athletics ===
Jonesville High was a traditional Class A football powerhouse in the Cumberland District along with Pennington High School. The Bulldogs won their last two Cumberland District Championships outright in 1982 and 1986. Late in the 1984 season Jonesville beat the number one ranked and unbeaten Pound High School team 9-7 before a capacity crowd at Pound, VA. Jonesville (9-5) won the Class A Division 1 State Championship in 1988 defeating Strasburg High School (13-0) by a score of 21 to 20 in overtime. Some of the players from the State Championship team include: Brady Yeary RB, Brett Clark QB, Dennis Roop LB, Tim Spence LB, Mark Sweeney TE, Larry Mullins OL, Monty Anderson, OL/DL, Robbie Newman WR, Jerry Ball OL, DL, Bobby Ball DT. Jonesville High's girls basketball team was the Class A State Runner-Up in 1982. The 1982 team was coached by Pop Robinson who still holds the VHSL record for the most career wins (576) in girls basketball. The Lady Bulldogs won two consecutive Region D Championships in 1982 and 1983.

The Lady Bulldogs also won consecutive Region D Championships in 1986 and 1987. They competed in the Final Four of the State.
