= UVA Wise Cavaliers =

University of Virginia's-Wise sports teams

- University: University of Virginia's College at Wise
- Conference: South Atlantic (primary)
- NCAA: Division II
- Athletic director: Kendall Rainey
- Location: Wise, Virginia
- Varsity teams: 15 (7 men's, 8 women's)
- Football stadium: Beaty-Richmond Field at Carl Smith Stadium
- Basketball arena: David J. Prior Convocation Center
- Baseball stadium: Burchell Stallard Field
- Softball stadium: Cavalier Field
- Lacrosse stadium: Beaty-Richmond Field at Carl Smith Stadium
- Tennis venue: Jim and Betty Humphreys Tennis Complex
- Nickname: Cavaliers
- Colors: Red and grey
- Website: uvawisecavs.com

The UVA Wise Cavaliers (formerly Virginia–Wise Cavaliers), nicknamed the "Highland Cavaliers", are the athletic teams that represent the University of Virginia's College at Wise, located in Wise, Virginia, in intercollegiate sports as a member of the NCAA Division II ranks, primarily competing in the South Atlantic Conference (SAC) since the 2019–20 academic year. The Cavaliers previously competed in the D-II Mountain East Conference (MEC) from 2013–14 to 2018–19.

Prior joining the NCAA, UVA Wise previously competed in the Mid-South Conference (MSC) of the National Association of Intercollegiate Athletics (NAIA) from 2010–11 to 2012–13 (with a partial provisional membership as a core member of the D-II Great Midwest Athletic Conference (G-MAC) during their D-II transition within the 2012–13 school year); in the Appalachian Athletic Conference (AAC) from 2001–02 to 2009–10; the Tennessee Valley Athletic Conference from 1994–95 to 2000–01; and in the Kentucky Intercollegiate Athletic Conference (KIAC; now currently known as the River States Conference (RSC) since the 2016–17 school year) from 1971–72 to 1993–94.

== History ==
On April 23, 2012, the college was accepted as a provisional member of the Great Midwest Athletic Conference (G-MAC) and announced it would begin competition as the G-MAC's seventh full member in the 2013–2014 academic year. UVA Wise also announced it planned to submit the NCAA application prior to June 1, 2012. Once accepted by the NCAA, the college will begin the official transition from NAIA to NCAA and if the requirements are met would become an active NCAA Division II member for the 2015–2016 academic year.

However, UVA Wise would play in the G-MAC for only one season; it announced on August 20, 2012, that it would become a charter member of the new Mountain East Conference, a conference made up mostly of former members of the West Virginia Intercollegiate Athletic Conference that ultimately launched in the 2013–14 academic year.

== Classifications ==
=== National affiliations ===
Years	Classification	Seasons
2013–14 to present	NCAA Division II	9
2012–13	NAIA & NCAA Division II	1
1968–1969 to 2011–2012	NAIA	45

=== Conference affiliations ===
Years	Conference	Seasons
2019–20 to present	South Atlantic Conference	3
2013–14 to 2018–19	Mountain East Conference	6
2012–13 (Note: UVA Wise had dual membership within the Mid-South of the NAIA and the G-MAC of NCAA Division II (provisional status) during the 2012–13 school year.)	Mid-South Conference; Great Midwest Athletic Conference (G-MAC)	1
2010–11 to 2011–12	Mid-South Conference	2
1995–96 to 2009–10	Appalachian Athletic Conference (AAC)	15
1994–95	NAIA Independent	3
1971–72 to 1993–94	Kentucky Intercollegiate Athletic Conference (KIAC)	23
1968–69 to 1970–71	NAIA Independent	3

== Varsity teams ==
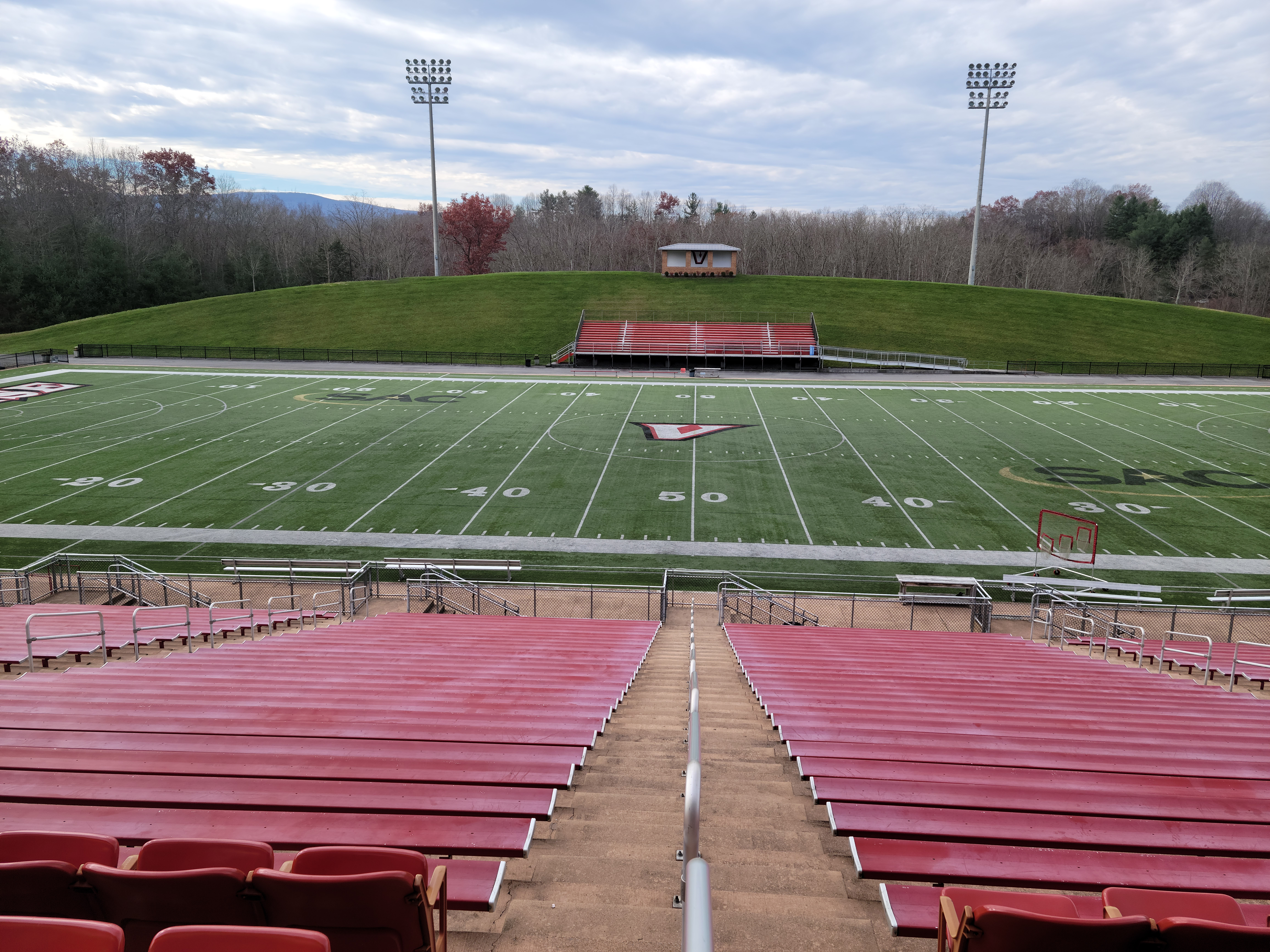
Carl Smith Stadium

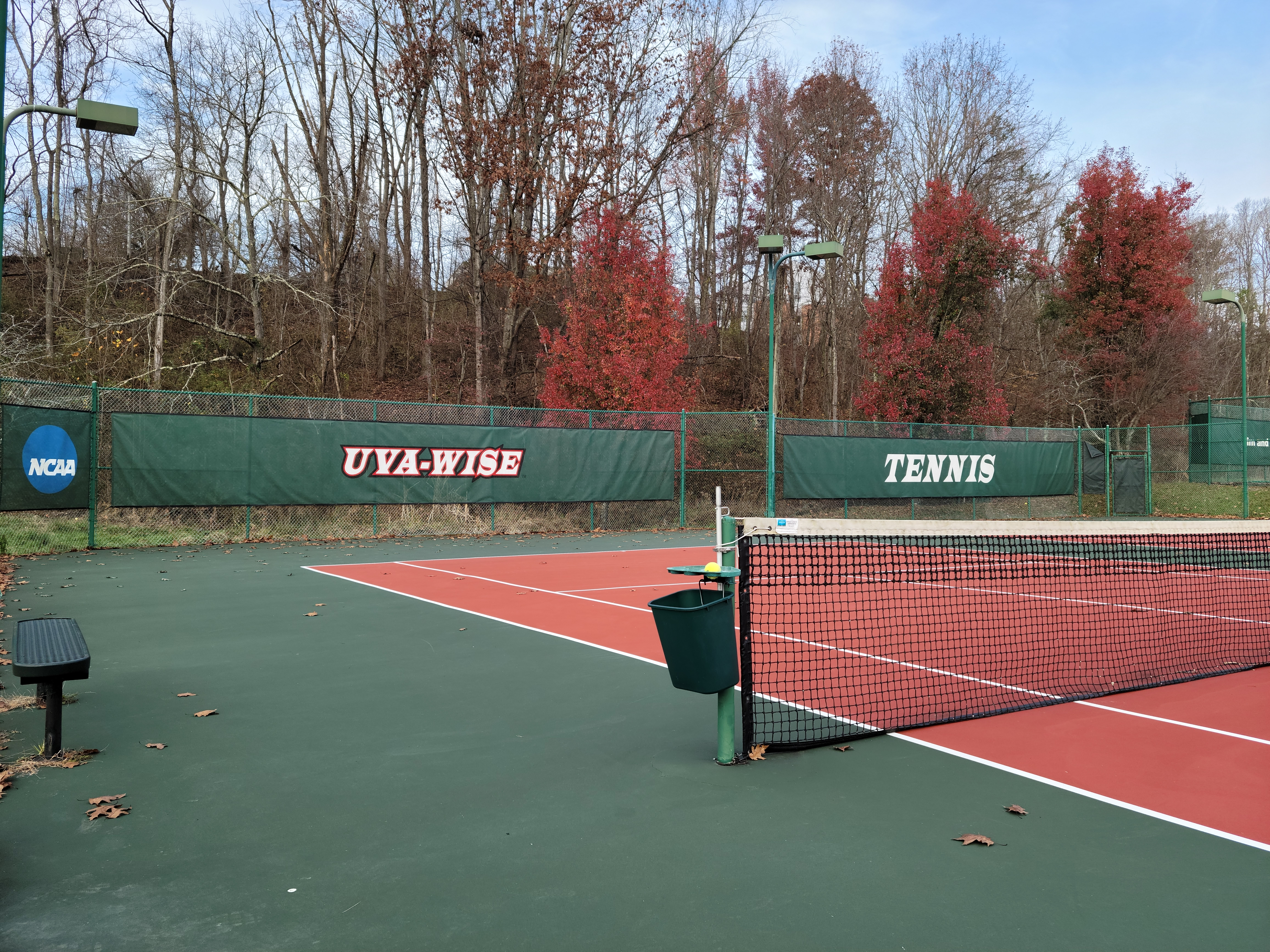
Tennis courts

Men's sports	Women's sports
Baseball	Basketball
Basketball	Cross country
Cross country	Golf
Football	Lacrosse
Golf	Softball
Tennis	Tennis
Track and field	Track and field
	Volleyball
