= Castlewood High School =

Public high school in Virginia, US

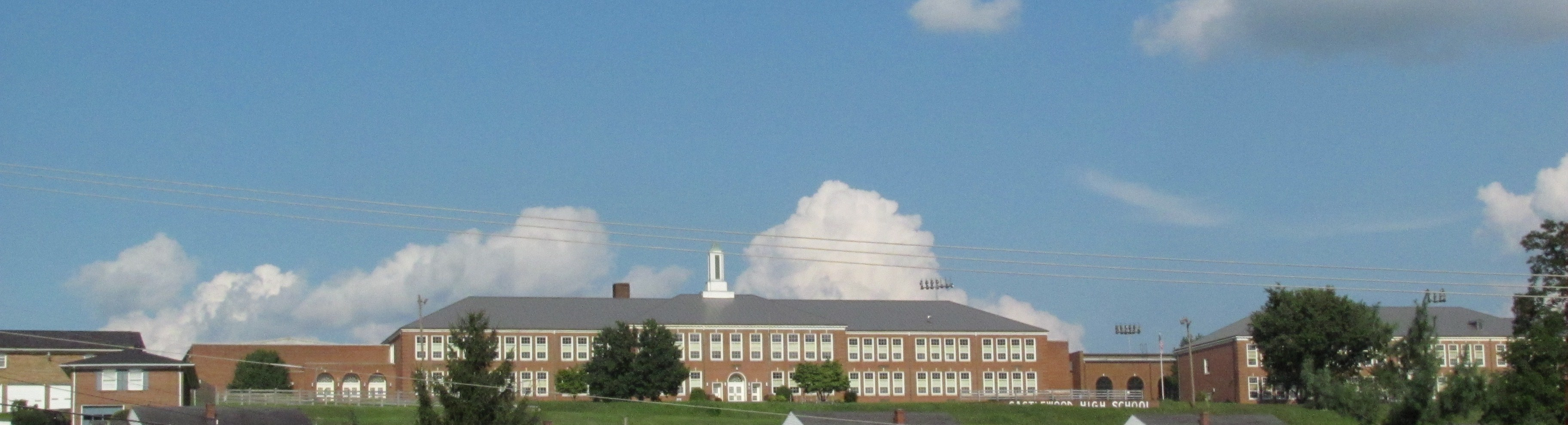

Location
- 304 Blue Devil Circle; Castlewood, Virginia 24224; United States
- Coordinates: 36°52′19.3″N 82°17′45.3″W

Information
- School type: Public, high school
- School district: Russell County Public Schools
- Superintendent: Gregory Brown
- Principal: Mike Roberson (K)
- Grades: 8-12
- Enrollment: 382 (2016-17)
- Language: English
- Colors: Blue and White
- Athletics: Wrestling, Academic, Baseball, Basketball, Cheerleading, Cross-Country, Football, Golf, Softball, Tennis, Track, Volleyball.
- Athletics conference: VHSL Class 1 VHSL Region D VHSL Cumberland District
- Mascot: Blue Devil
- Website: Official Site

Castlewood High School is a high school located in Castlewood, Virginia. The school offers Advanced Placement, Dual Enrollment, and Career/Technical courses in addition to other academic courses. The school also offers classes with Virtual Virginia Schools. Castlewood High School was integrated in 1965 with students from Arty Lee High School in Dante, Virginia.

== Athletics ==
=== Baseball ===
Castlewood High School has won two VHSL state championships in baseball in 1971 and 1986 with second-place finishes in 1972, 1973, and 1974.

Baseball State Championship
Year	Winning Team		Losing Team		Class
1986	Castlewood	15	Amelia County	2	A
1974	Madison County	2	Castlewood	0	A
1973	Goochland	6	Castlewood	1	A
1972	Goochland	15	Castlewood	3	A
1971	Castlewood	3	Goochland	2	A

=== Softball ===
Castlewood won a state championship in softball in 1987 and finished second in 1995.

Softball State Championship Games
Year	Winning Team		Losing Team		Class
1995	Madison County	9	Castlewood	4	A
1987	Castlewood	9	Central Senior	7	A

=== Other sports ===
Castlewood finished second in the state championships in boys' golf in 2007. The boys' golf team took second place in state championships in 1971, 1987, and 1988. The girls' volleyball team won the state championship in 1987. The wrestling team won state championship in 1989, placed second in 1986 and fourth in 2009.
