= Paul Davis (linebacker) =

American football player (born 1958)

No. 59, 63
- Position: Linebacker

Personal information
- Born: July 10, 1958 (age 68); Appalachia, Virginia, U.S.
- Listed height: 6 ft 2 in (1.88 m)
- Listed weight: 221 lb (100 kg)

Career information
- High school: Appalachia (Virginia)
- College: North Carolina (1977–1980)
- NFL draft: 1981: undrafted

Career history
- Oakland Raiders (1981)*; Atlanta Falcons (1981–1982); New York Giants (1983); St. Louis Cardinals (1983)
- * Offseason or practice squad member only
- Stats at Pro Football Reference

Paul Calvin Davis (born July 10, 1958) is an American former professional football linebacker who played three seasons in the National Football League (NFL) with the Atlanta Falcons, New York Giants and St. Louis Cardinals. He played college football at the University of North Carolina at Chapel Hill.

== Early life and college ==
Paul Calvin Davis was born July 10, 1958, in Appalachia, Virginia. He attended Appalachia High School in Appalachia.

He was a member of the North Carolina Tar Heels football team from 1977 to 1980 and a three-year letterman from 1978 to 1980.

== Professional career ==
Davis signed with the Oakland Raiders after going undrafted in the 1981 NFL draft. He was released by the Raiders on August 25, 1981.

Davis signed with the Atlanta Falcons on September 24, 1981. He played in 13 games for the Falcons during his rookie year in 1981. He appeared in nine games, starting, one during the 1982 season. He also played in one playoff game that year. Davis was released by the Falcons on August 28, 1983.

Davis was signed by the New York Giants on September 21, 1983. He played in three games for the Giants before being released on October 14, 1983.

He signed with the St. Louis Cardinals on November 9, 1983, and appeared in six games for them during the 1983 season. He was released on August 21, 1984.
