= St. Paul High School (Virginia) =

Location
- 3207 4th Avenue; St. Paul, Virginia 24283; United States
- Coordinates: 36°54′24.75″N 82°18′37.78″W

Information
- School type: Public, high school
- Founded: 1905
- Closed: 2011
- School district: Wise County Public Schools
- Superintendent: Jeff Perry
- Principal: Paul Clendenon
- Grades: 8-12
- Enrollment: 200
- Language: English
- Colors: Purple and Old Gold
- Athletics conference: Cumberland District; Region D
- Mascot: Deacons
- Rival: Castlewood High School, Coeburn High School
- Newspaper: The Deacon Elite
- Website: Official Site

St. Paul High School, located in St. Paul, Virginia was part of Wise County Public Schools. St. Paul High educated approximately 200 students ranging from 8th through 12th grades. The school recently submitted its application for President Obama's Race to the Top High School Commencement Challenge. After the 2010–2011 school year, St. Paul High School closed when Wise County Public Schools consolidated Coeburn High School and St. Paul to form Eastside High School in Coeburn, Virginia.

== Extracurricular activities ==
St. Paul High School had many different organizations that met during club schedules. Many of these organizations went on special field trips to Dollywood and state conferences. St. Paul had very active Virginia FBLA and Virginia FCCLA organizations. St. Paul FBLA has had three national competitors in the past three years, two state officers, and a state president. FCCLA has had two state winners.

=== Academics ===
St. Paul High School was one of the first to gain full accreditation in Wise County. The 2007–2008 school year had nearly 50% having advanced on the Virginia SOL tests. The high school prided itself in being a small community school with high SOL scores. The school won the Wachovia Cup for the 1992–1993 season as well as the Creative Writing championship for 1993. The school also has many P.A.C.E. championships. In 1941, Saint Paul was awarded for a Trophy Class Yearbook.

== Wetlands Project ==
The Wetlands Estonoa Project was a student initiated and run project focused on reclaiming a local wetlands and educating the community about its value. It has achieved national notoriety, including receiving a large federal grant to build the Vencil Learning Center. The student group received an award by former President George W. Bush.

== Notable alumni ==
Steven Jason Williams - known as Boogie2988, YouTuber.
