= Norton City Schools (Virginia) =

School district in Virginia, United States

Address
- 205 Virginia Avenue NW Norton, Virginia, 24273; United States

District information
- Grades: K-12
- Superintendent: Gina Wohlford
- School board: Norton City School Board
- Chair of the board: Cody McElroy
- Governing agency: Virginia Department of Education
- Schools: Norton Elementary and Middle School, John I. Burton High School

Students and staff
- Athletic conference: Cumberland Conference (Region 1D)
- District mascot: Raiders
- Colors: Orange and Black

Other information
- Website: https://www.nortoncityschools.org/

Norton City Schools is the school division of Norton, Virginia. Its schools are Norton Elementary and Middle School and John I. Burton High School. Pursuant to state law and the Norton City Charter, Norton City Schools is governed by the Norton City School Board and multiple state legislative and administrative departments.

The current Superintendent of Norton City Schools is Gina Wohlford, and the Chairman of the Norton City School Board is Cody McElroy.
