= Twin Springs High School =

Location
- 273 Titan Lane; Nickelsville, VA 24271; United States; 36°46′47″N 82°27′47.7″W

Information
- School type: Public, High School
- Established: 1968
- School district: Scott County Public Schools
- Superintendent: Greg Baker
- CEEB code: 471555
- Principal: Jordan Mullins
- Grades: 8-12
- Gender: Co-ed
- Language: English
- Hours in school day: Seven
- Color: Red White Blue
- Athletics: Football, Golf, Volleyball, Basketball, Baseball, Softball, Track, Cross Country, Tennis, Cheer
- Athletics conference: VHSL Class 1 VHSL Region D VHSL Cumberland District
- Mascot: Titan
- Accreditation: Fully
- Yearbook: Mountain Echo
- Website: https://tshs.scottschools.com/

Twin Springs High School is a public high school located in rural Nickelsville, Virginia.

== Sports ==
Twin Springs' mascot is the Titan. Its official colors are red, white, and blue.

=== Basketball ===
In 1993, the Twin Springs boys' basketball team won the Division A Virginia state championship.
