= Wise County Public Schools =

School district in Virginia, United States

Location
- Wise County, Virginia

District information
- Type: Public, school division
- Grades: PK – 12
- Superintendent: Greg Mullins, D.Ed
- Chair of the board: Larry Greear

Other information
- Website: www.wisek12.org

Wise County Public Schools is a school district based in Wise, Virginia in Wise County.

The district, which includes the county, operates five elementary/primary schools, one combined K-8 school, three middle schools, three high schools, an alternative school and a vocational-technical school.

== Schools ==
School	Location	Grades	Notes
Central High School	Wise	9-12	Formed from the consolidation of J. J. Kelly High School and Pound High School
Coeburn Middle School	Coeburn	5-8	
Coeburn Primary School	Coeburn	PreK-4	
Eastside High School	Coeburn	9-12	Formed from the consolidation of Coeburn High School and St. Paul High School
J. W. Adams Combined School	Pound	PreK-8	
L. F. Addington Middle School	Wise	5-8	
Union Middle School	Big Stone Gap	5-8	
Union Primary School	Big Stone Gap	PreK-4	
St. Paul Elementary School	St. Paul	PreK-8	
Union High School	Big Stone Gap	9-12	Formed from the consolidation of Powell Valley High School and Appalachia High School
Wise County Alternative Education Center	Wise	9-12	School for students who do not excel in a traditional school environment
Wise County Career-Technical Center	Wise	9-12	
Wise Primary School	Wise	PreK-4	
