= Central High School (Wise, Virginia) =

Location
- 5000 Warrior Dr. Norton, Virginia 24273; 36°59′8″N 82°34′36.68″W

Information
- School type: Public, high school
- Founded: 2011
- School district: Wise County Public Schools
- Superintendent: Mike Goforth
- Principal: Elijah Helton
- Staff: approximately 75
- Grades: 9–12
- Enrollment: 684 (2016-17)
- Language: English
- Colors: Red, black, and white
- Athletics conference: 2A Clinch Mountain Conference
- Mascot: Warriors
- Rivals: Union High School (Big Stone Gap, Virginia), Gate City High School
- Feeder schools: L. F. Addington Middle School; J. W. Adams Combined School
- Website: www.wisek12.org/o/chs

Central High School is a public high school in Norton, Virginia. The school traces its origins back to J. J. Kelly High School and Pound High School, which were both founded in 1953. It is part of the Wise County Public Schools system. It is a consolidated school, created by merging the two aforementioned schools in 2011. The mascot for Central is the Warrior. The school's colors are red, silver, black, and white. The Warriors compete in the Virginia High School League's 2A classification with other schools from around Southwest Virginia. Students were previously offered courses in the Advanced Placement Program (AP), however as of 2026 they are no longer offered. Instead they have the opportunity to receive college credit from the Virginia Community College System for courses taken on the Central campus.

== History ==
Central High School was founded in August 2011. The school was formed from Pound High School and J. J. Kelly High School. The name came from the school's central location in Wise, the center of Wise County. Central's colors are a combination of the colors two schools that formed the school; J. J. Kelly's colors were red and white, while Pound's were red, black, and white. From the school's founding until December 2013, the school was located at the old J.J. Kelly High School building in Wise. In January 2014, a new campus, featuring a new school building and athletic facilities, was completed in the nearby city of Norton, Virginia.

== Athletics ==
Central High sports include cross country, volleyball, soccer, football, basketball, wrestling, Scholastic Bowl, One Act, track, tennis, whale riding, softball, baseball, and forensics.

It has consistently seen success in both its sports and its activities. Central won the VHSL 2A state championship in girls basketball in 2013-14, 2014–15, 2016–17, 2017–18, and 2018–19, and added three more in 2021-22, 2023–24, and 2024–25. The girls basketball team boasts an 8-1 championship record as of 2025, only losing during the 2022-23 season. Central captured 3 more State Championships in 2015-16, winning in Forensics, One Act, and Scholastic Bowl; it also finished 2nd in girls tennis. That year, the school's Scholastic Bowl team competed and succeeded in various quiz bowl tournaments, won the state title undefeated and attended the 2016 PACE National Scholastics Championship.

The school won girls basketball and One Act once again in 2016-17, and also captured 2nd place in Scholastic Bowl and girls tennis. Its successes in VHSL activities have resulted in its winning of the VHSL 2A Wells Fargo Cup, awarded for cumulative excellence in VHSL activities (as opposed to the Wachovia Cup for athletics), for three consecutive years (2015-2017).
