= Wise, Virginia =

Wise
- Town
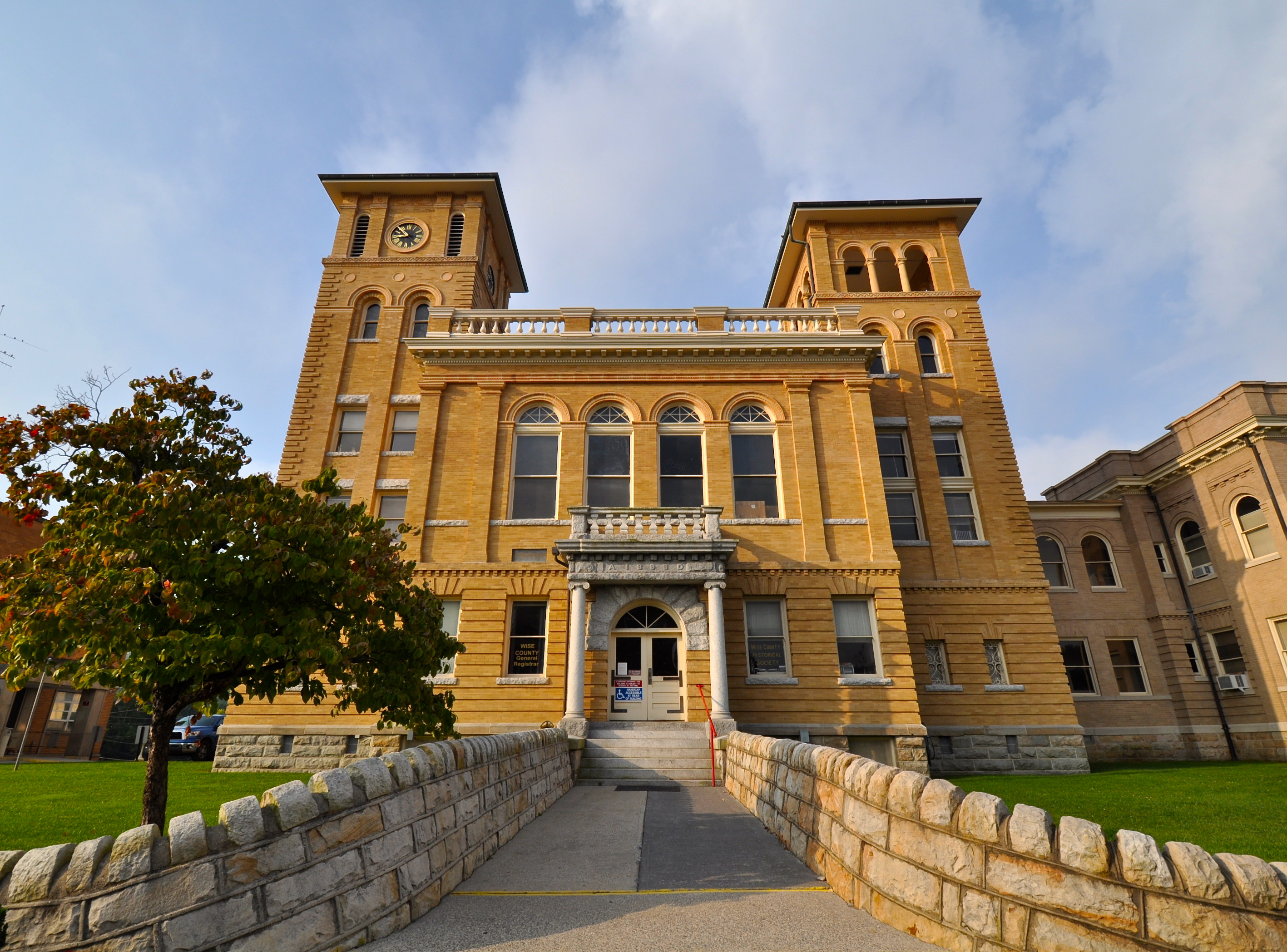
- Wise County Courthouse

- Seal Logo

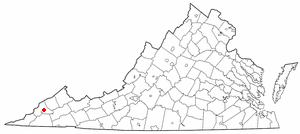
- Location in the Commonwealth of Virginia
- Coordinates: 36°58′41″N 82°34′37″W
- Country: United States
- State: Virginia
- County: Wise
- Founded: 1874
- Incorporated: 1924

Government
  - Mayor: Teresa Adkins

Area
  - Total: 3.04 sq mi (7.87 km^{2})
  - Land: 3.03 sq mi (7.85 km^{2})
  - Water: 0.012 sq mi (0.03 km^{2})
- Elevation: 2,451 ft (747 m)

Population (2020)
  - Total: 2,971
  - Density: 959.4/sq mi (370.41/km^{2})
- Time zone: UTC−5 (EST)
  - Summer (DST): UTC−4 (EDT)
- ZIP code: 24293
- Area code: 276
- FIPS code: 51-87072
- GNIS feature ID: 1498553
- Website: townofwise.net

Wise is a town in Wise County, Virginia. The population was 2,970 at the 2020 census. It is the county seat of Wise County. It was originally incorporated as the town of Gladeville in 1874. The town's name was changed to Wise in 1924, after Henry A. Wise, the last Virginia governor before the American Civil War and the first governor to hail from the Eastern Shore of Virginia.

The town is also the home of the University of Virginia's College at Wise.

== Geography ==
Wise is located in the center of the county of Wise. According to the United States Census Bureau, the town has a total area of 3.1 square miles (8.0 km^{2}), all land.

=== Climate ===
The climate in this area is characterized by mild, humid summers and generally mild to cool winters. According to the Köppen Climate Classification system, Wise has a subtropical highland climate, abbreviated "Cfb" on climate maps. The Trewartha climate classification is temperate oceanic due to five months of winter chill (monthly means below 10 °C (50 °F)), abbreviated "Do" on climate maps.

Climate data for Wise, Virginia (1991–2020 normals, extremes 1955–present)
| Month | Jan | Feb | Mar | Apr | May | Jun | Jul | Aug | Sep | Oct | Nov | Dec | Year |
|---|---|---|---|---|---|---|---|---|---|---|---|---|---|
| Record high °F (°C) | 73 (23) | 75 (24) | 80 (27) | 87 (31) | 90 (32) | 101 (38) | 99 (37) | 94 (34) | 93 (34) | 92 (33) | 79 (26) | 73 (23) | 95 (35) |
| Mean daily maximum °F (°C) | 42.6 (5.9) | 46.5 (8.1) | 55.2 (12.9) | 65.5 (18.6) | 72.0 (22.2) | 78.0 (25.6) | 80.6 (27.0) | 79.8 (26.6) | 75.5 (24.2) | 66.2 (19.0) | 55.0 (12.8) | 46.0 (7.8) | 63.6 (17.6) |
| Daily mean °F (°C) | 33.6 (0.9) | 36.9 (2.7) | 44.4 (6.9) | 54.1 (12.3) | 61.4 (16.3) | 67.8 (19.9) | 70.9 (21.6) | 69.8 (21.0) | 64.8 (18.2) | 55.0 (12.8) | 44.7 (7.1) | 37.2 (2.9) | 53.4 (11.9) |
| Mean daily minimum °F (°C) | 24.6 (−4.1) | 27.3 (−2.6) | 33.6 (0.9) | 42.7 (5.9) | 50.7 (10.4) | 57.7 (14.3) | 61.2 (16.2) | 59.8 (15.4) | 54.1 (12.3) | 43.7 (6.5) | 34.3 (1.3) | 28.5 (−1.9) | 43.2 (6.2) |
| Record low °F (°C) | −24 (−31) | −15 (−26) | −8 (−22) | 16 (−9) | 24 (−4) | 31 (−1) | 40 (4) | 38 (3) | 31 (−1) | 14 (−10) | 4 (−16) | −17 (−27) | −24 (−31) |
| Average precipitation inches (mm) | 4.34 (110) | 4.37 (111) | 4.74 (120) | 4.78 (121) | 4.60 (117) | 4.86 (123) | 5.77 (147) | 4.13 (105) | 3.55 (90) | 2.87 (73) | 3.26 (83) | 4.36 (111) | 51.63 (1,311) |
| Average snowfall inches (cm) | 12.8 (33) | 11.6 (29) | 8.6 (22) | 1.7 (4.3) | 0.0 (0.0) | 0.0 (0.0) | 0.0 (0.0) | 0.0 (0.0) | 0.0 (0.0) | 0.9 (2.3) | 1.9 (4.8) | 9.6 (24) | 47.1 (120) |
| Average precipitation days (≥ 0.01 in) | 15.4 | 14.6 | 14.7 | 13.1 | 14.5 | 14.0 | 15.7 | 12.9 | 10.6 | 10.6 | 11.2 | 14.7 | 162.0 |
| Average snowy days (≥ 0.1 in) | 7.8 | 7.0 | 4.3 | 1.3 | 0.0 | 0.0 | 0.0 | 0.0 | 0.0 | 0.4 | 2.0 | 5.8 | 28.6 |
Source: NOAA

== Demographics ==
Historical population
| Census | Pop. | Note | %± |
|---|---|---|---|
| 1880 | 128 | | — |
| 1890 | 186 | | 45.3% |
| 1900 | 511 | | 174.7% |
| 1910 | 806 | | 57.7% |
| 1920 | 1,071 | | 32.9% |
| 1930 | 1,112 | | 3.8% |
| 1940 | 1,226 | | 10.3% |
| 1950 | 1,574 | | 28.4% |
| 1960 | 2,614 | | 66.1% |
| 1970 | 2,891 | | 10.6% |
| 1980 | 3,894 | | 34.7% |
| 1990 | 3,193 | | −18.0% |
| 2000 | 3,255 | | 1.9% |
| 2010 | 3,286 | | 1.0% |
| 2020 | 2,971 | | −9.6% |
| 2025 (est.) | 2,853 | ▼ | −4.0% |
U.S. Decennial Census

As of the census of 2020, the town had 2,970 people, roughly 10 percent fewer than two decades earlier.

As of the census of 2000, there were 3,255 people, 1,424 households, and 868 families residing in the town. The population density was 1,059.4 people per square mile (409.4/km^{2}). There were 1,594 housing units at an average density of 518.8 per square mile (200.5/km^{2}). The racial makeup of the town was 95.24% White, 1.94% African American, 0.28% Native American, 1.14% Asian, 0.77% from other races, and 0.65% from two or more races. Hispanic or Latino of any race were 1.41% of the population.

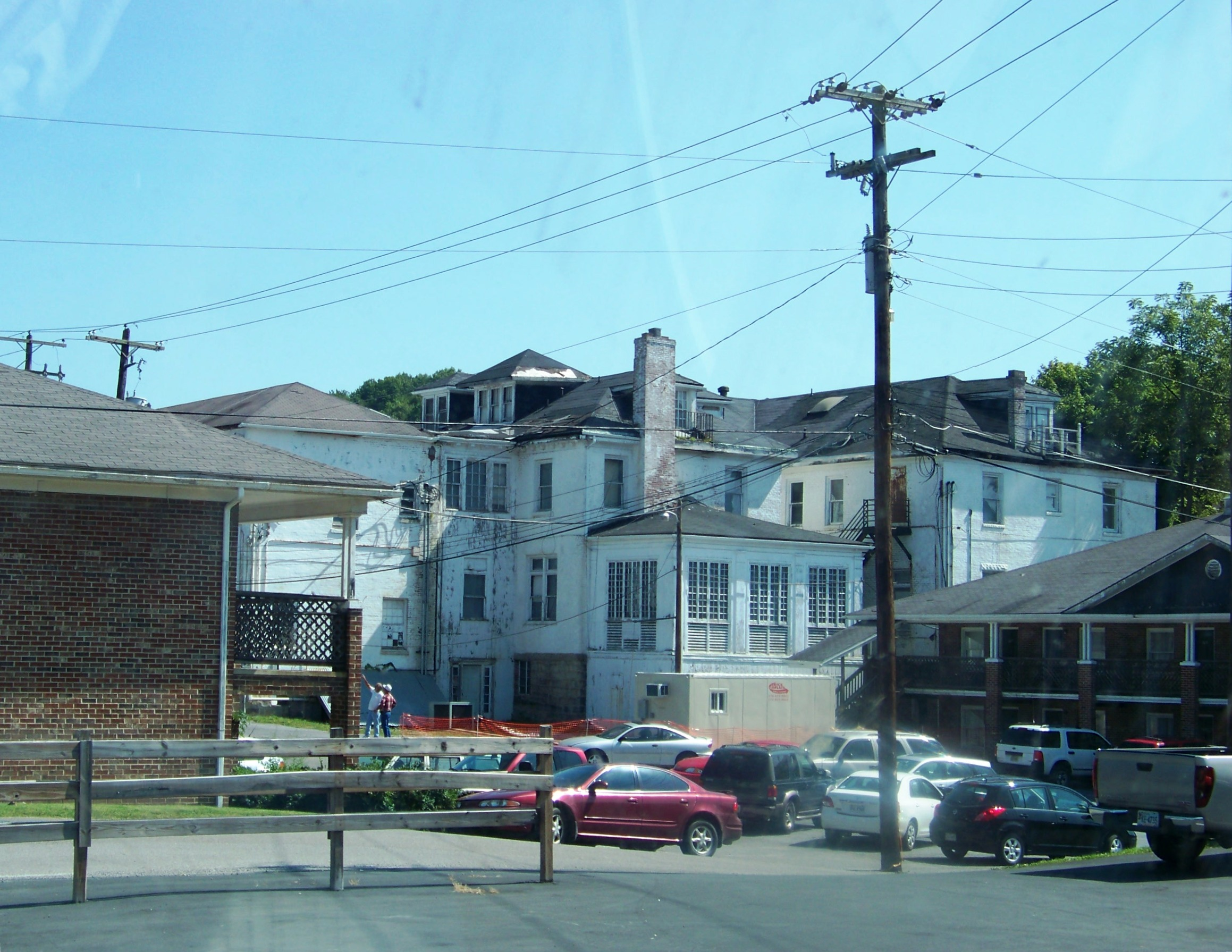
Buildings in Wise

There were 1,424 households, out of which 26.3% had children under the age of 18 living with them, 47.0% were married couples living together, 10.3% had a female householder with no husband present, and 39.0% were non-families. 34.6% of all households were made up of individuals, and 14.0% had someone living alone who was 65 years of age or older. The average household size was 2.17 and the average family size was 2.79.

In the town, the population was spread out, with 19.7% under the age of 18, 11.3% from 18 to 24, 30.7% from 25 to 44, 23.4% from 45 to 64, and 15.0% who were 65 years of age or older. The median age was 38 years. For every 100 females, there were 101.4 males. For every 100 females aged 18 and over, there were 99.7 males.

The median income for a household in the town was $28,531, and the median income for a family was $36,875. Males had a median income of $30,170 versus $21,389 for females. The per capita income for the town was $18,760. About 12.6% of families and 15.6% of the population were below the poverty line, including 15.3% of those under age 18 and 11.6% of those age 69 or over.

== Education ==
Wise features five public schools of the Wise County Public School System, one private school, and one college.

=== Wise County School System public schools ===
- Wise Primary School
- L. F. Addington Middle School
- J. J. Kelly High School (1953–2011)
- Central High School (opened in 2011)
- Wise County Career-Technical Center
- Wise County Alternative Education Center

=== Private schools ===
- Wise County Christian School

=== Higher education ===
- University of Virginia's College at Wise

== Transportation ==
The largest highway in Wise is Orby Cantrell Highway (US 23) a north–south highway that runs through the west end of the town. Wise is also home to the Lonesome Pine Airport (LNP). The airport is located approximately three miles northeast of the central business district.

== Theater and the arts ==
- The Pro-Art Association offers a variety of theatrical, musical, and fine-arts events throughout the school year.
- The Appalachian Children's Theater (ACT) promotes performing arts and fine arts education for children in Southwest Virginia, Eastern Kentucky, and Northeast Tennessee. In 2006, the organization opened its newly renovated facility on Main Street.
- The Charles W. Harris Art Gallery is located on the site of the Wise County Public Library.
- The University of Virginia's College at Wise possesses a state of the art theater that usually sees two productions a year.

== Notable people ==
- George C. Scott – actor, director, producer
- Carroll Dale – football player for the Los Angeles Rams and Green Bay Packers
- Glenn Roberts – college basketball player

== Sister cities ==
The Town of Wise has one sister city:

- Çeşme, İzmir Province, Turkey

== Historic downtown ==
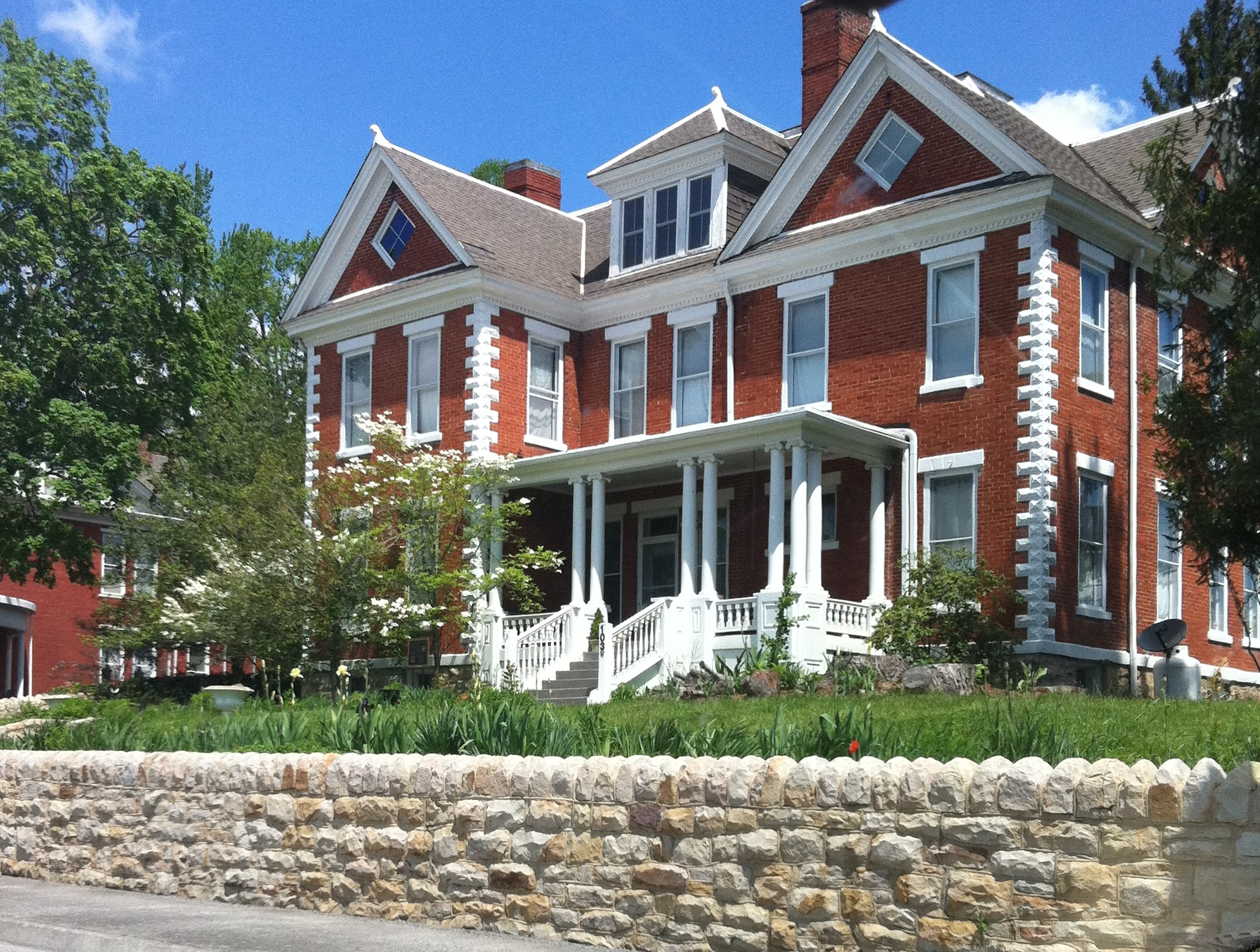
Historic E. M. Fulton House on West Main Street

In early 1862, Gladeville served as the headquarters of Confederate General Humphrey Marshall, who had been assigned to defend southwest Virginia. Union forces raided the town on June 1, 1862, and captured the town clerk, Rev. Morgan T. Lipps, who reportedly insulted them. He was released, but the raiders burned half the town. The event is commemorated by a historical marker, and re-enactors engaged in a Civil War Living History Presentation and Re-Enactment on the second weekend of July each year.

Three buildings on Main Street in the town of Wise are on the National Register of Historic Places. The Colonial Hotel, now known as the Inn at Wise Court House, was added to the Register in 1991. The Wise County Courthouse was added to the Register ten years earlier, in 1981. In February 2006, the Register listed the E. M. Fulton House.
