= University of Virginia's College at Wise =

American public liberal arts college

The University of Virginia's College at Wise
- Former names: Clinch Valley College of the University of Virginia (1954–1999)
- Type: Public liberal arts college
- Established: 1954; 72 years ago
- Parent institution: University of Virginia
- Accreditation: SACS
- Academic affiliations: COPLAC; SCHEV
- Endowment: $108 million (2019)
- Chancellor: Donna P. Henry
- Academic staff: 140
- Students: 2,330 as of fall 2024, including 2,304 undergraduate students and 26 graduate students
- Location: Wise, Virginia, United States; 36°58′21″N 82°33′22″W
- Campus: 400 acres (1.6 km^{2}); Distant town
- Colors: Red and blue
- Nickname: Cavaliers
- Sporting affiliations: NCAA Division II – South Atlantic
- Mascot: Smiddy the Cavalier
- Website: uvawise.edu
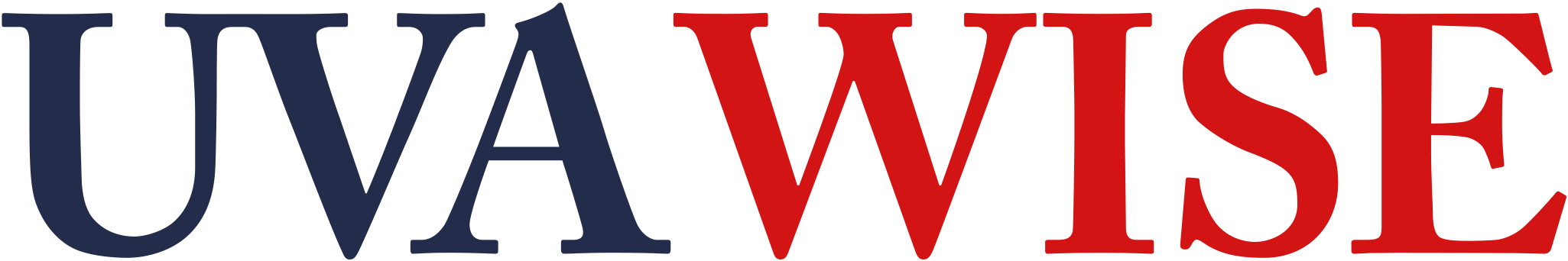

The University of Virginia's College at Wise (UVA Wise) is a public liberal arts college located in Wise County, Virginia, and partially in the Town of Wise. It is part of the University of Virginia, though separately accredited. The college was established in 1954 as Clinch Valley College of the University of Virginia.

== History ==
=== Opening ===
The college was first conceived by local residents who petitioned the University of Virginia to establish a college in Wise. The decline of the Appalachian coal mining industry in the 1950s had led to a need for a higher education institution. As support for a college grew, the Commonwealth of Virginia appropriated $5,000 to open, staff, and operate the college as a two-year junior college on a trial basis for a year; and if successful, another $5,000 would be available for a second year. In the winter of 1954, the local community matched the commonwealth's funds and collected over $6,000 to furnish the classrooms and use for supplies. Wise County donated over 16-acre (6.5 ha) of property, the former Wise County Poor Farm, that included one sandstone building, Crockett Hall, which was used as an academic building. The campus was surrounded by land that was a former coal mining site.

Clinch Valley College of the University of Virginia opened in September 1954 with an enrollment of 100 freshmen, two-thirds of whom were Korean War veterans. Clinch Valley College became the westernmost state-supported college in Virginia. Prior to its opening, Virginia lacked public colleges west of Radford.

In its early years, the college also acquired the building known now as Bowers-Sturgill Hall for use as faculty housing.

=== 20th century ===
Clinch Valley College operated as a junior college throughout the late 1950s and 1960s. During that time, the college gained more support from graduates who wanted to complete their baccalaureate degrees at the same institution, and the college began the process to become a four-year college. The college granted its first Bachelor of Arts degrees in June 1970 and its first Bachelor of Science degrees in 1973. The college continued to grow and added new programs such as nursing and technology. In 1996, the college granted its first Bachelor of Science in Nursing degrees.

By 1959, two new academic buildings, the Science Center and Zehmer Hall, and the new Greear gymnasium were under construction. In the 1960s, Wyllie Library was constructed. During this decade, the college notably elected to transport a series of already-constructed residence buildings to the west side of campus for use as faculty housing, rather than construct new buildings. In the 1970s, the original Gilliam Center for the Arts, an McCraray residence hall, and Smiddy Hall, an additional academic/administrative building, were constructed.

During the 1980s and 1990s, Cantrell Hall, then known as the Cantrell Student Union; the Chapel; a dining facility; a bookstore; and Asbury, Thompson, and Martha Randolph residence halls were all constructed due to a surge in enrollment to 1,000 students. Also during this period, the SEED Center, Resource Center and student apartments across Darden Drive were acquired.

In 1999, the Virginia General Assembly renamed the school "The University of Virginia's College at Wise," following an unsuccessful effort to change the institution's name in 1991.

In the late 1990s and early 2000s, UVA Wise expanded its focus on international education and signed three sister agreements with international institutions, along with initiating cooperative and mutual exchange programs for students and faculty at those institutions. In 1998, the college signed a sister institution agreement with Istanbul University. A year later, it signed a second agreement with another Turkish university, Dumlupinar University in Kütahya. In December 2000, the University of Seville in Spain became the college's third sister institution.

=== 21st century ===
Through the early 21st century, UVA Wise underwent rapid growth, with several new buildings and campus beautification projects to accommodate enrollment growth. New facilities from the early 2000s include Henson and Culbertson residence halls, the Slemp Student Center, a football field house and stadium seating, the new expanded library, the central lake, the Hunter J. Smith Dining Commons, the new Gilliam Center for the Arts, the $30 million David J. Prior Convocation Center, and Commonwealth (renamed in 2020 to Andrew J. Still and Lois Ann Roark Still) residence hall. The college also renovated and constructed an addition to the Leonard W. Sandridge Science Center; it is now LEED Silver certified.

As of September 2010, the college offered 31 majors, 31 minors and 23 teaching specialties and had an enrollment of about 2,005 students. On February 2, 2012, UVA Wise saw the unexpected death of Chancellor David J. Prior. During his seven years as chancellor, the college experienced dramatic growth in student enrollment and facilities. During his tenure, the UVA Wise's five-year fund raising campaign, known as the "Fulfilling the Dream" campaign, exceeded its goal to raise $50 million.

In April 2024, the college celebrated the opening of its new Pippin-Wyllie Nursing facility in the former location of the library, which at the time was called Pippin-Wyllie Library.

==== Convocation Center ====
State lawmakers and regional leaders joined college officials on July 1, 2009, to break ground for a $30 million Convocation Center, the largest single capital project in the college's history at that time. The facility seats 3,000 for sporting events and 3,600 for concerts or convocation activities. The facility provides the region with its first venue to seat large crowds, something economic developers have said is needed to boost growth and development in far Southwest Virginia. The facility opened in 2011. Shortly after the death of Chancellor David J. Prior in February 2012, the facility was dedicated in his honor and named the David J. Prior Convocation Center.

== Campus ==
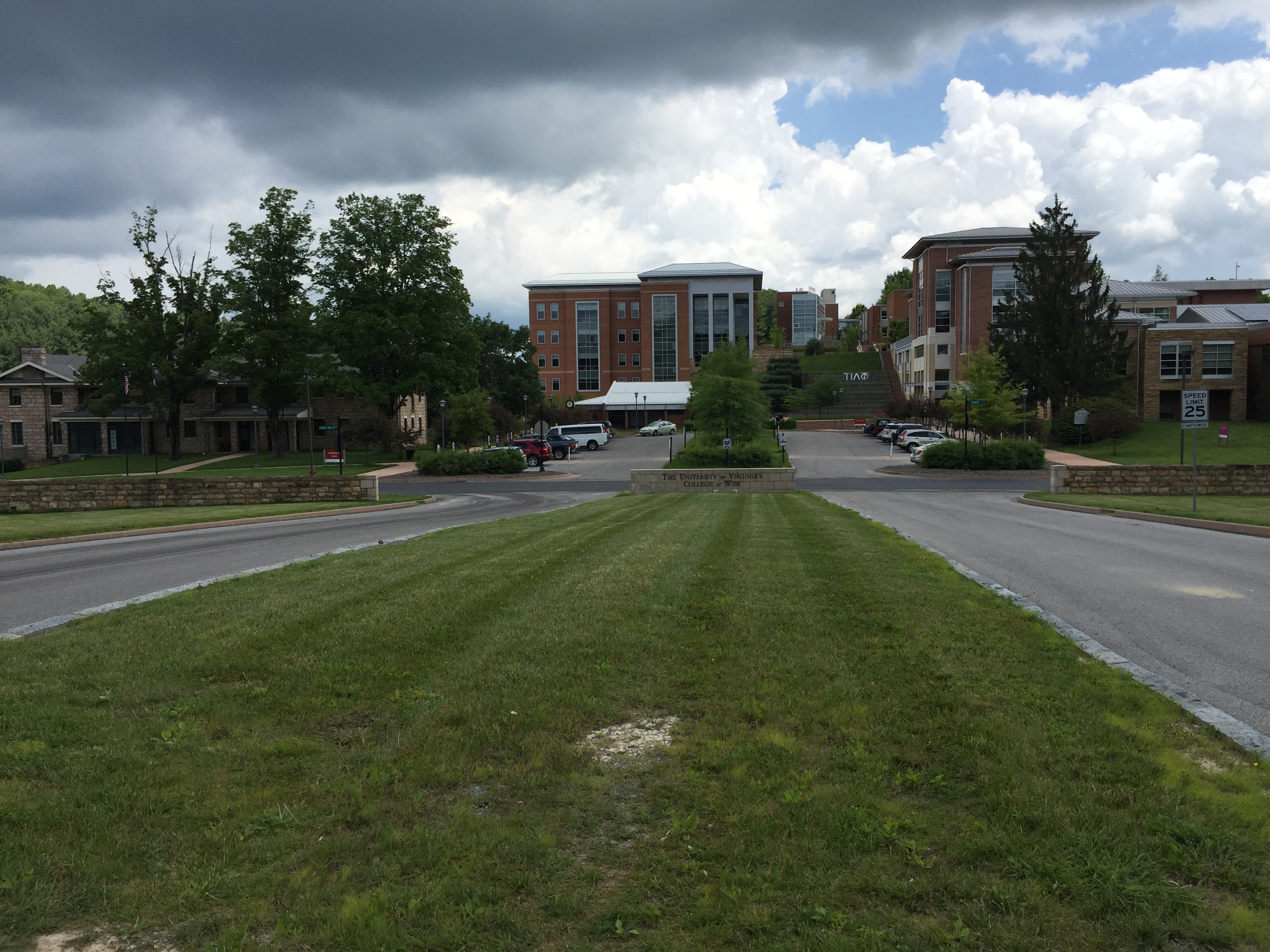
Entrance to the campus, which is designated as SR 382

The University of Virginia's College at Wise comprises 396 acres (160 ha) just outside of the small town of Wise. It is approximately 52 miles (84 kilometers) from Kingsport, Tennessee and 48.5 mi (78.1 km) from Pikeville, Kentucky.

Crockett and Bowers-Sturgill Halls are two examples of a regionally-distinct architecture: simple buildings of local sandstone with shallow-pitched hip roofs and pronounced overhangs. In 2000, VMDO Architects completed an architectural palette plan that the school has followed since.

The university is its own census-designated place, in unincorporated Wise County, Virginia. The school district serving the CDP is Wise County Public Schools.

The series of small buildings on Clinch Valley Drive, some of which had been transported to the school in the 1960s, have been slowly supplanted by larger student residence halls. The remaining buildings have now been converted to fulfill other, non-housing, functions.

== Academics ==
=== Accreditations ===
UVA Wise is accredited by the Southern Association of Colleges and Schools Commission on Colleges (SACSCOC) to award baccalaureate degrees. In addition, the college's computer science and software engineering degree programs are accredited by the Accreditation Board for Engineering and Technology (ABET), the nursing program is accredited by the Commission on Collegiate Nursing Education (CCNE), the teacher education program is accredited by the Teacher Education Accreditation Council (TEAC), and the chemistry program is accredited by the American Chemical Society (ACS).

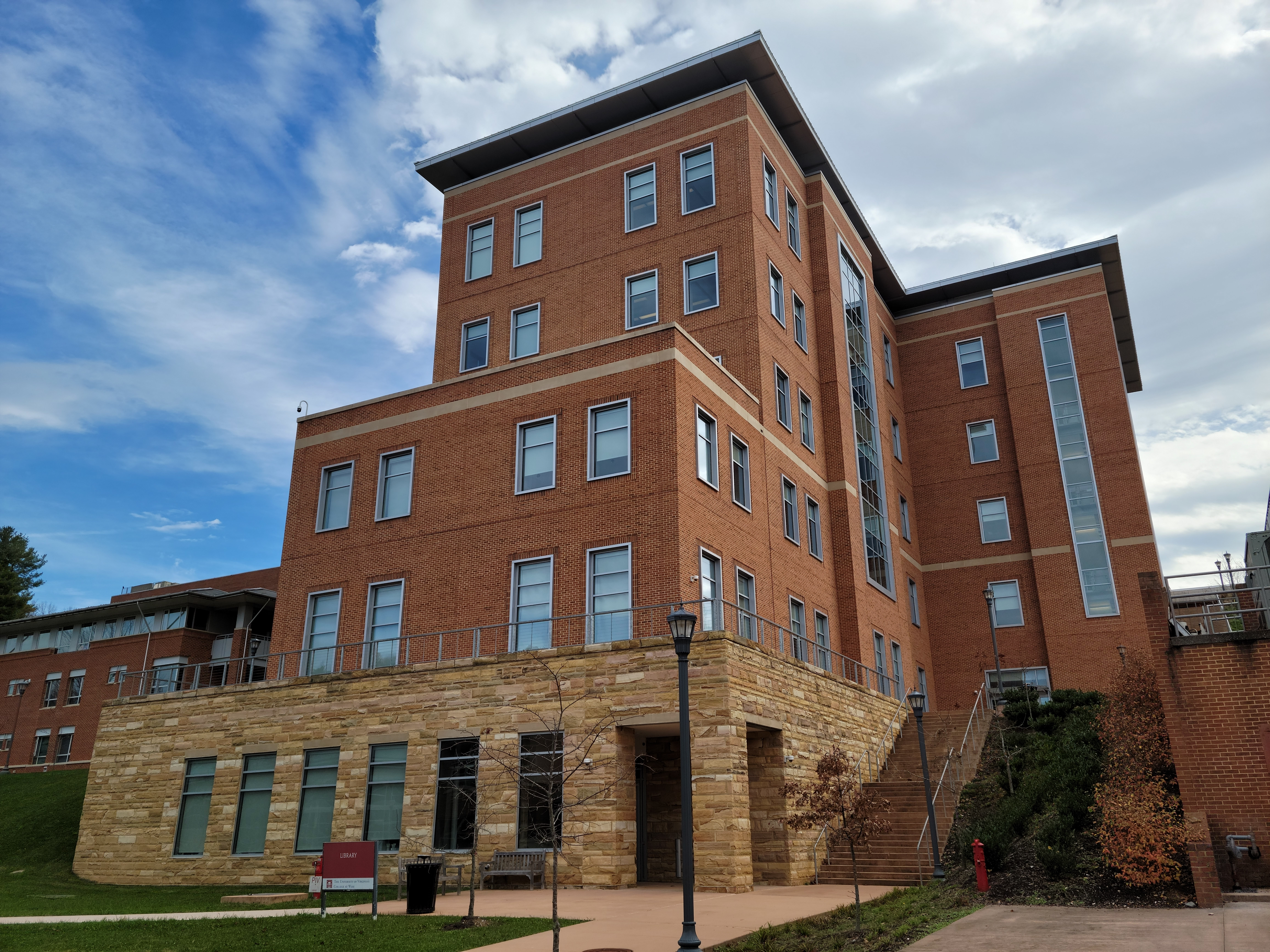
Library

=== Departments ===
UVA Wise has ten departments:

- Department of Business & Economics
- Department of Communications
- Department of Education
- Department of History & Philosophy
- Department of Language and Literature
- Department of Mathematics and Computer Science
- Department of Natural Sciences
- Department of Nursing
- Department of Social Sciences
- Department of Visual and Performing Arts

The college requires all freshmen to enroll in a one-semester seminar that covers adjusting to the demands of college academic work. The seminar used to cover two semesters, until it was modified in the 2012-13 fall semester. Before the modified seminar, the student's seminar instructor became their advisor until the student selected a major. Presently, if the student is unsure of the major that he or she wants to be in, the Advising Office becomes the student's adviser.

The college has a 48-49 semester-hour general education requirement. The general education curriculum was recently redesigned, which involved a lessening of the hour requirement.

Students must attend four cultural activities in each their freshman and junior years. The college offers 3 baccalaureate degrees in 34 majors.

=== Graduate Programs ===
In the fall 2023 semester, the college implemented its first graduate program, the M.Ed. under the Department of Education, which is a 30 credit-hour, non-thesis program. It is also developing an MSN program, and SACSCOC recently visited the campus to complete a change of level of its accreditation.

== Student life ==
Undergraduate demographics as of Fall 2023
Race and ethnicity	Total
White	50%
Unknown	36%
Black	9%
Asian	2%
Hispanic	1%
Two or more races	1%
Economic diversity
Low-income (Note: The percentage of students who received an income-based federal Pell grant intended for low-income students.)	55%
Affluent (Note: The percentage of students who are a part of the American middle class at the bare minimum.)	45%

=== Greek life ===
There are two Greek life organizations on campus. Sigma Alpha Omega is the sorority and Alpha Gamma Omega is the fraternity.

=== Student publications ===
The Highland Cavalier is the student-run newspaper. The college also has a biannual literary journal, Jimson Weed.

== Athletics ==
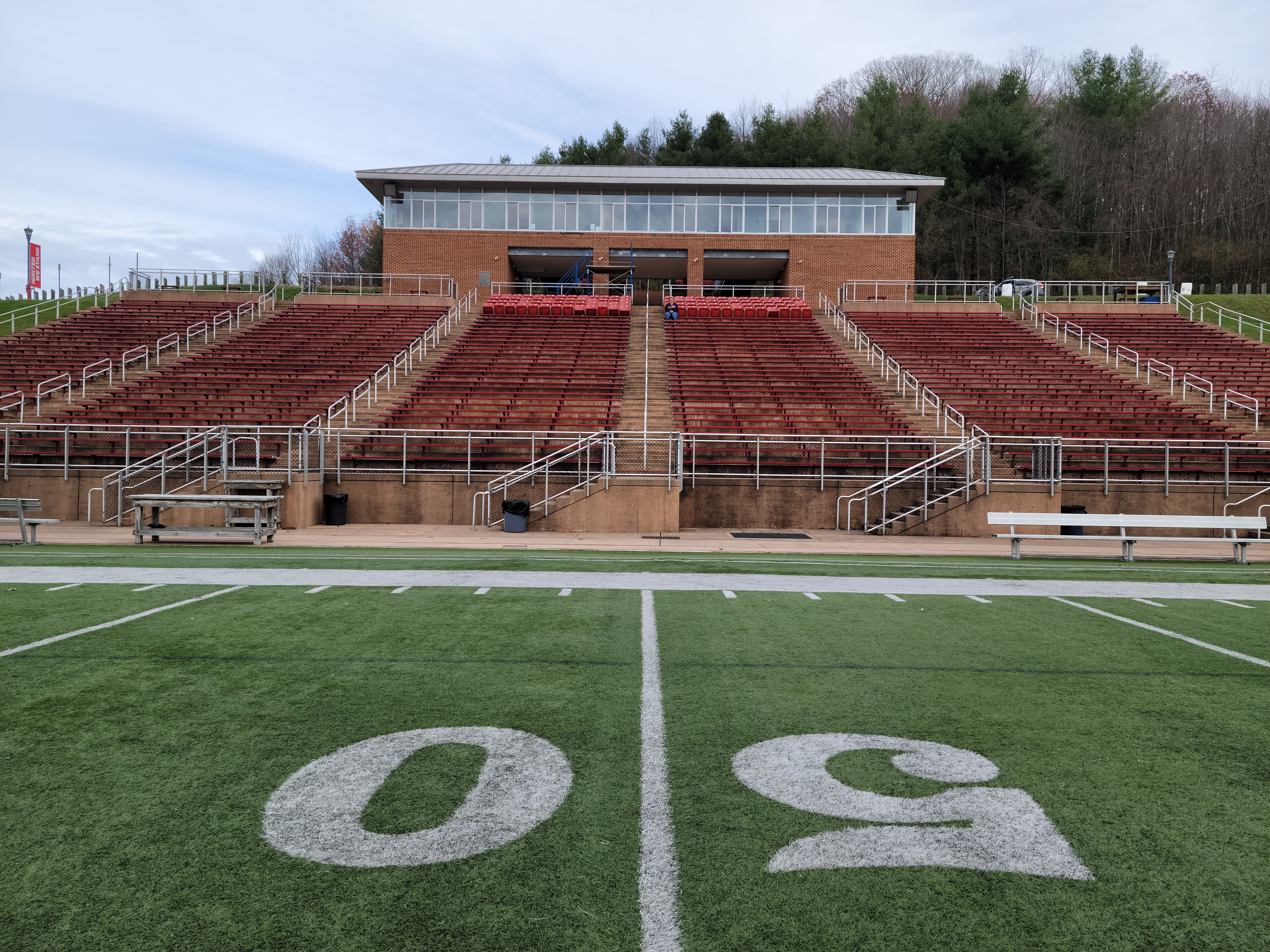
UVA Wise football field, stands, and announcer's booth

The UVA Wise athletic teams are called the Cavaliers (formerly known as the "Highland Cavaliers" before 2017), The college is a member of the NCAA Division II ranks, primarily competing in the South Atlantic Conference (SAC) since the 2019–20 academic year. The Cavaliers previously competed in the D-II Mountain East Conference (MEC) from 2013–14 to 2018–19.

Prior joining the NCAA, UVA Wise previously competed in the Mid-South Conference (MSC) of the National Association of Intercollegiate Athletics (NAIA) from 2010–11 to 2012–13 (with a partial provisional membership as a core member of the D-II Great Midwest Athletic Conference (G-MAC) during their D-II transition within the 2012–13 school year); in the Appalachian Athletic Conference (AAC) from 2001–02 to 2009–10; the Tennessee Valley Athletic Conference from 1994–95 to 2000–01; and in the Kentucky Intercollegiate Athletic Conference (KIAC; known as the River States Conference (RSC) since the 2016–17 school year) from 1971–72 to 1993–94.

UVA Wise competes in 13 intercollegiate varsity sports: Men's sports include baseball, basketball, cross country, football, golf and tennis; while women's sports include basketball, cross country, golf, lacrosse, softball, tennis and volleyball.

=== Accomplishments ===
Since moving to NCAA Division II in 2013, the school has claimed conference titles in softball and men's golf. Most recently, in 2018, their women’s lacrosse program went undefeated in the regular season and finished with a conference championship in their former home of the Mountain East Conference.

== Student publications ==
=== Newspaper ===
The college's student newspaper, the Highland Cavalier, published its first edition in 1955, two years after the founding of the college. However, the most recent edition was published in 2014, over ten years ago.

=== Television ===
As of 2012, the college broadcasts student news on channel 55, a public access cable station, under the call sign CAV-TV.

== Notable alumni ==
- Hakeem Abdul-Saboor, Olympic bobsledder who competed in the two-man event at the 2018 & 2022 Winter Olympics, as well as the four-man event in 2022.
- Jerry Kilgore, politician. During 1987 and 1988, Kilgore served as an Assistant United States Attorney for the Western District of Virginia. He was Secretary of Public Safety under Governor George Allen from 1994 to 1998 and was elected Attorney General of Virginia in 2001 by a wide margin.
- Terry Kilgore, politician, elected to the Virginia House of Delegates in 1993; graduated from Clinch Valley College (now UVA Wise).
- Randy Hippeard, professional football player.
- Steven Williams, YouTube personality known as Boogie2988, attended the school but did not graduate.

== Demographics ==
The University of Virginia's College at Wise was delineated as a census designated place in the 2020 U.S. census.
