= Union High School (Big Stone Gap, Virginia) =

Public high school in Big Stone Gap, Virginia, US

Coordinates: 36.8794°N 82.7374°W

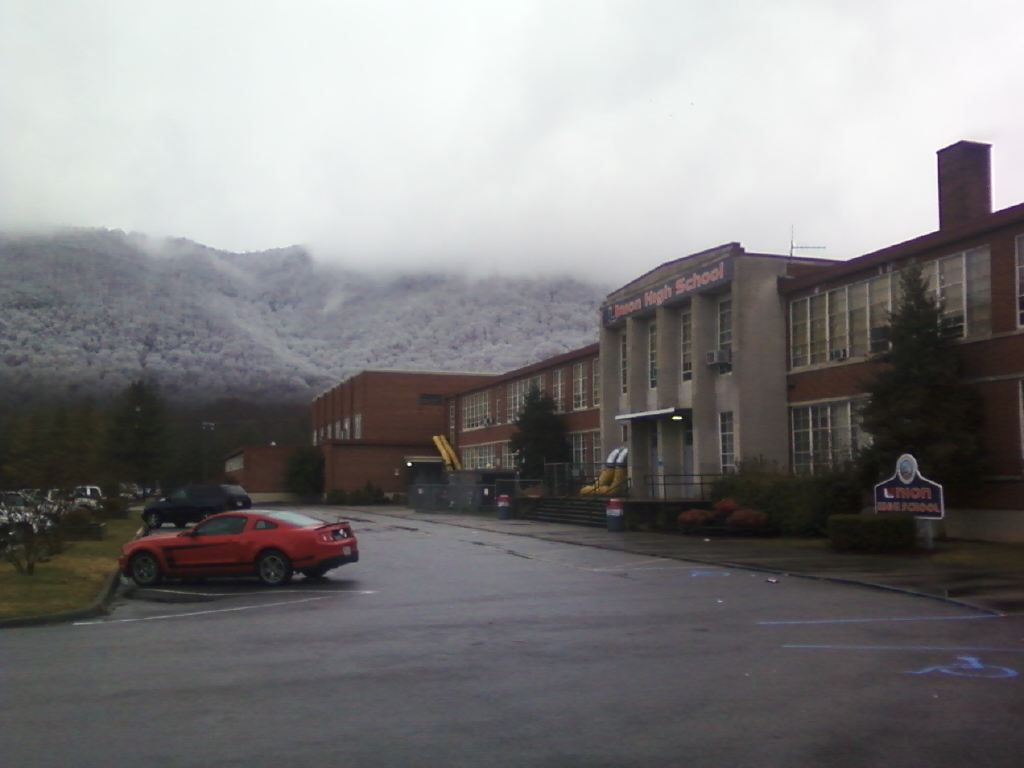

Location
- Two Champions Avenue; Big Stone Gap, Virginia 24219; United States

Information
- Founded: 2011
- School district: Wise County Public Schools
- Superintendent: Mike Goforth
- Principal: Jerred Chandler
- Teaching staff: 37.53 (on an FTE basis)
- Grades: 9–12
- Enrollment: ~572 (2026-2027)
- Student to teacher ratio: 15.11
- Language: English
- Campus: Rural
- Colors: Navy, orange, and white
- Athletics conference: Mountain 7 District, Region D
- Mascot: Bear
- Communities served: Appalachia, Big Stone Gap, Virginia
- Feeder schools: Union Primary School; Union Middle School
- Website: www.wisek12.org/o/uhs

Union High School, located in Big Stone Gap, Virginia, is part of Wise County Public Schools. Union High School is a consolidated school, serving students from Appalachia and Big Stone Gap. The school enrollment is about 600.

== History ==
Union High School originally opened in mid-August 2011. The school was formed with the consolidation of Appalachia High School and Powell Valley High School during late 2010–2011 under the direction of Wise County Public Schools in a plan that brought the number of high schools in the county from six to three.

The name Union represents the unity between the two former rivals and serves as the goal of the student body to come together as a single group. The mascot and colors are a combination of the rival school's colors into a unity (Baby Blue and Royal Blue into Navy Blue; Red and Gold into Orange), and the bear symbolizes the location of the school in the Appalachian Mountains.

For the 2011 school year, studies and sporting events (with the exception of football) were held in the existing building formerly known as Powell Valley High School. The building was fixed to act as a neutral zone, being repainted in the new school's colors, given new exterior signs to represent the change and a complete renovation to the gym including new court markings and pads with the school's colors and name on them. A new facility was constructed behind the current site at Powell Valley, and the new school opened in August 2014.

== Location ==
The school is located close to the Orby Cantrell Highway just outside Big Stone Gap, Virginia. The building is placed in a small area of land that also holds Union Primary School and Union Middle School, and has its own street name (Two Champions Avenue) designated to it. Though this street is not physically marked by VDOT, it does act as the official mailing address for Union High School.

The current school has, in addition to the main building, a field house, a football practice field, and a high school regulation baseball field. Union High School is the only school in the county that does not have its own football complex, with all games being held at Bullitt Park in downtown Big Stone Gap.

After the resurrection of the new Union High School facility, the old Powell Valley High School was demolished and new parking facilities for the school housed on the site of the old school building, and a park-like area placed between the campus and main-road as an aesthetic addition.

After the anticipated additional influx of traffic added to the school by the closing of Appalachia Elementary School in June 2017 and to resolve traffic issues already present, a modern mini-roundabout was added at the intersection of Two Champions Avenue, Shawnee Avenue E, and north and south-bound traffic on Powell Valley Road (State Route 610). The project was completed just in the nick of time for the 2017-2018 school year to begin and a ribbon-cutting ceremony was conducted on August 1, 2017, with the first day of school scheduled for August 3, 2017. A group of UHS students played a big part in the project, built with $125,000 in county coal and gas severance tax funds. Under the guidance of UHS teacher and Family, Career and Community Leaders of America (FCCLA), its leader – Connie Carico – and members researched driver safety issues at the school, conducted traffic count and pattern assessments, and were both organizers and participants in committee meetings with community partners, an effort that gave rise to the roundabout project.

== Athletics ==
Union High School competes as a Class 2 school in the Virginia High School League's Mountain 7 Division of Region D.

The school has won state championships in boys' cross country, golf and boys' basketball. The boys team won 1st in the 5000 Meter Run in 2019. The school's first state championship was in golf in October 2018, which was held at the Lonesome Pine Country Club just a short distance from the school.

The school has also seen success in football, appearing in the Virginia High School League’s Class 2 State Semifinals in 2015, 2017, 2020 (a season which was played in Spring 2021 due to COVID-19), and 2025.

Travis Turner was the school’s football coach from 2011 through 2025. He was a star quarterback of the Appalachia High School, which consolidated with Powell Valley High School in 2011. His father Tom Turner was the head football coach for Appalachia until his unexpected death in April 2006.

In November 2025, it was rumored that Travis Turner had inappropriate relations with a student. An investigation into these claims was originally set to take place by the Wise County School District as well as the Virginia State Police. However, Turner fled before he could be questioned by officials. He is currently wanted on ten felony arrest warrants, including five counts of possession of child pornography and five counts of using a computer to solicit a minor. To this day, Travis Turner is still at-large, and his whereabouts remain unknown.

In early 2026, Turner was formally dismissed from his position as football coach and teacher by Wise County Public Schools. His successor was hired and announced in Spring 2026.

The new football coach for Union High School beginning in 2026 will be Jamie Harless, formerly head football coach at Lord Botetourt High School in Daleville, Virginia.

== Notable alumni ==
- James Mitchell, American NFL football player with the Carolina Panthers, played college football at Virginia Tech
