= U.S. Route 23 in Virginia =

Segment of American highway

U.S. Route 23
- US 23 highlighted in red

Route information
- Maintained by VDOT
- Length: 60.80 mi (97.85 km)
- Existed: early 1930s–present
- Tourist routes: Virginia Byway

Major junctions
- South end: US 23 near Weber City
- US 58 / US 421 in Weber City; SR 65 in Clinchport; US 58 / US 421 in Duffield; US 58 Alt. in Big Stone Gap; US 58 Alt. in Norton
- North end: US 23 near Pound

Location
- Country: United States
- State: Virginia
- Counties: Scott, Lee, Wise, City of Norton

Highway system
- United States Numbered Highway System; List; Special; Divided; Virginia Routes; Interstate; US; Primary; Secondary; Byways; History; HOT lanes
← SR 22	→ SR 24

U.S. Route 23 (US 23) is a part of the United States Numbered Highway System that runs from Jacksonville, Florida, to Mackinaw City, Michigan. In Virginia, the U.S. Highway runs 60.80 miles (97.85 km) from the Tennessee state line near Weber City north to the Kentucky state line near Pound. US 23, which is known as Orby Cantrell Highway for most of its course, is a four-lane divided highway that follows Corridor B of the Appalachian Development Highway System through Southwest Virginia. The U.S. Highway serves as the main east–west highway of Scott County and the primary north–south highway of Wise County. US 23 runs concurrently with US 58 from Weber City to Duffield and with US 58 Alternate (US 58 Alt.) between Big Stone Gap and the independent city of Norton.

== Route description ==
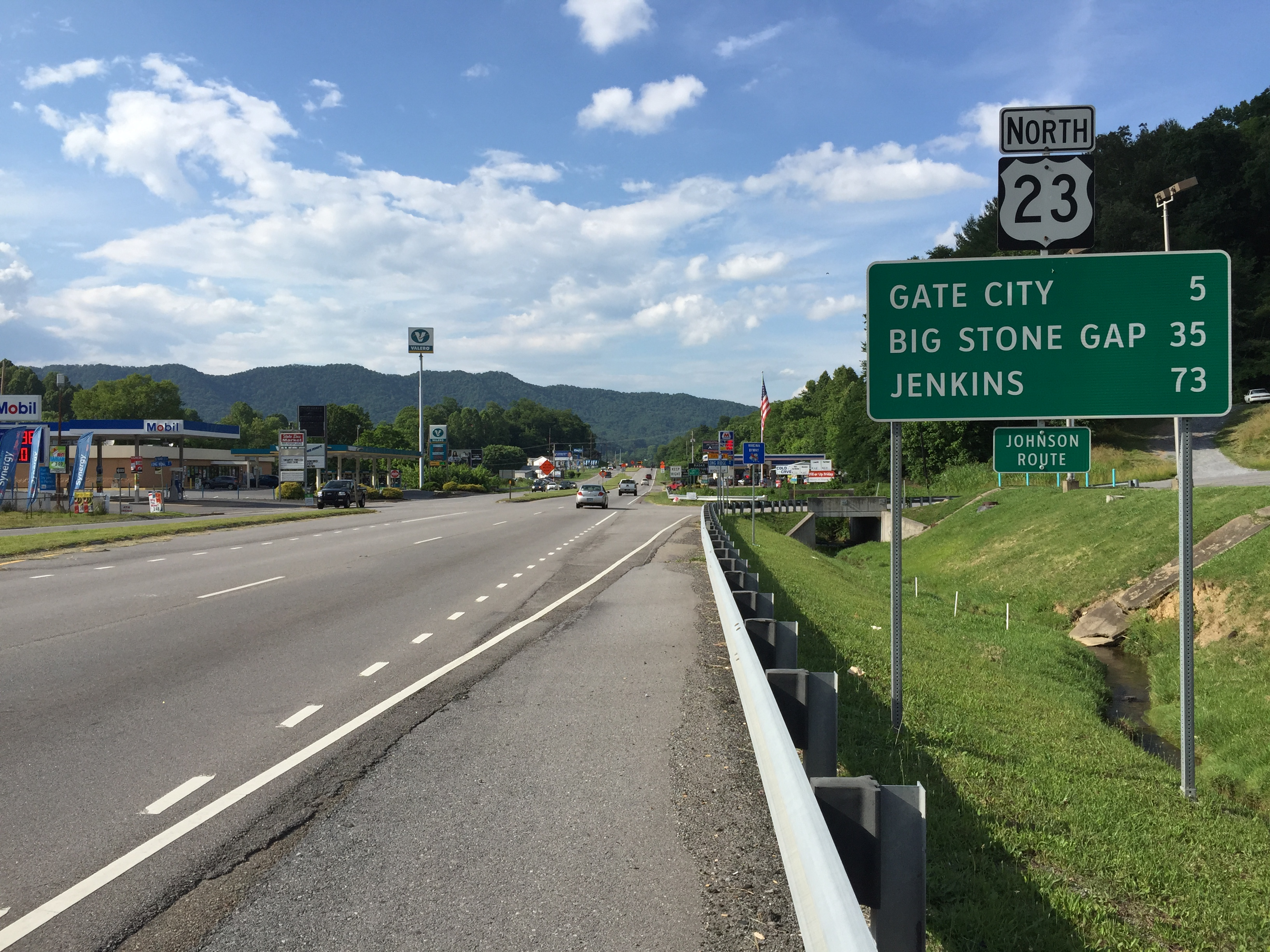
View north along US 23 at SR 732 just north of the Tennessee state line south of Weber City

US 23 enters Scott County at the Tennessee state line south of Weber City immediately north of the northern end of the US 23 freeway that becomes Interstate 26 in Kingsport. At the state line, US 23 has a partial interchange with the northern end of State Route 36 (SR 36; Lynn Garden Drive) and SR 346 (Carters Valley Road). US 23 passes through a gap between Cloud Ridge and Long Ridge at the state line, then crosses the North Fork Holston River on the John M. Johnson Memorial Bridge. The U.S. Highway enters the town of Weber City as Main Street, which parallels Norfolk Southern Railway's Appalachia Division as a four-lane undivided highway. At the north edge of the town, US 23 intersects US 58 and US 421 (Hilton Road); the three highways run concurrently with the railroad through Moccasin Gap, where Moccasin Creek passes through Clinch Mountain. US 23, US 58, and US 421 enter the town of Gate City; US 23 Business (US 23 Bus.), US 58 Bus., and US 421 Bus. pass through the center of town while the mainline of the U.S. Highways follows the flank of Clinch Mountain to the south of town.

US 23, US 58, and US 421 receive their three business routes at an interchange west of Gate City. The U.S. Highways parallel the railroad and Little Moccasin Creek west between Clinch Mountain to the south and Moccasin Ridge to the north. The highways curve north and parallel the Clinch River to Clinchport, where the road meets the southern end of State Route 65 (SR 65) and begins to follow Stock Creek. US 23, US 58, and US 421 pass by Glenita, where the railroad splits north to pass through the Natural Tunnel, the centerpiece of Natural Tunnel State Park. After passing through the Devil's Racepath, US 58 and US 421 split from US 23 as Daniel Boone Trail just south of the town of Duffield. US 23 passes through the town, where the highway parallels the Appalachia Division rail line and the North Fork Clinch River through a gap between Powell Mountain and Cliff Mountain. The U.S. Highway briefly enters Lee County while following the river between Powell Mountain and Walden Ridge to its source at Wildcat Summit at the Lee–Wise county line.

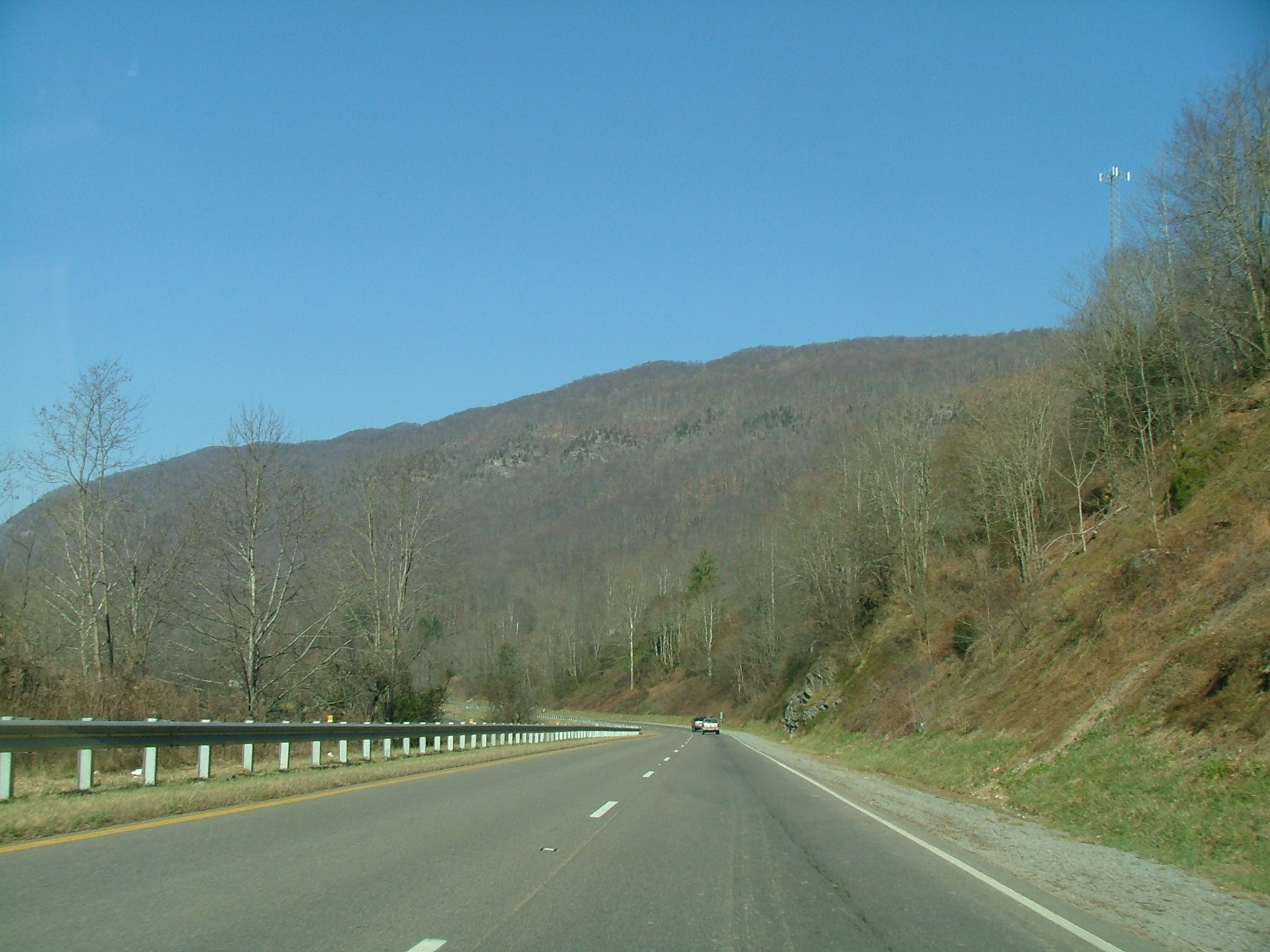
Northbound US 23 near Duffield

Upon entering Wise County, US-23 becomes known as the Orby Cantrell Highway for its entire run through the county (including its short segment in the City of Norton) until reaching the Kentucky border at Pound Gap. US 23 follows Wildcat Creek and becomes a freeway adjacent to Mountain Empire Community College south of Big Stone Gap. The U.S. Highway has a partial cloverleaf interchange with US 23 Bus. and US 58 Alt.; the latter highway joins US 23 in a concurrency. The two highways have a diamond interchange with SR 610 (Powell Valley Road) before following the southern flank of Little Stone Mountain to Little Stone Gap, where the freeway enters the city of Norton. US 23 and US 58 Alt. have a partial cloverleaf interchange with Kentucky Avenue south of downtown Norton. The highways curve north over a rail line and SR 74 before reaching a partial cloverleaf interchange where US 58 Alt. splits east on Norton Coeburn Road, which heads west toward downtown Norton as SR 283. US 23 leaves the city of Norton and receives the other end of US 23 Bus. (Esserville Road) at Esserville. A short distance to the north, US 23 enters the town of Wise, where another US 23 Bus. splits northeast as Norton Road to serve the county seat of Wise County. The U.S. Highway receives the north end of its business route (Main Street) before the highway crosses the Tennessee Valley Divide at Indian Mountain. US 23 descends along Indian Creek to the southern end of its fourth business route, which heads into the town of Pound as Indian Creek Road. The U.S. Highway briefly enters the town limits while receiving the north end of the business route, Main Street. North of Pound, US 23 passes through Horse Gap and makes a curve to the west before entering Kentucky at Pound Gap in Pine Mountain. The U.S. Highway meets US 119 on the north side of the mountain; the two highways run concurrently north toward Pikeville.

Much of US 23 in Virginia is part of Crooked Road and The Crooked Road: Virginia's Heritage Music Trail.

== History ==
The road from Moccasin Gap (now Weber City) south to Tennessee toward Kingsport was added to the state highway system in 1923. As a spur of SR 10 (now US 58), it was assigned the State Route 102 (SR 102) designation and was renumbered State Route 108 (SR 108) in the 1928 renumbering.

== Exit list ==
County	Location	mi	km	Old exit	New exit	Destinations	Notes
Scott		0.00	0.00			US 23 south to I-26 – Kingsport	Tennessee state line
Scott	Weber City	2.92	4.70			US 58 east / US 421 south / SR 224 south (Wadlow Gap Highway) – Bristol, Abingdon, Hiltons, Carter Fold	Southern end of concurrency with US 58 and US 421
Scott	Gate City	3.96	6.37			US 23 Bus. north / US 58 Bus. west / US 421 Bus. north (Kane Street) to SR 71 – Gate City	
Scott		6.69	10.77			US 23 Bus. south / US 58 Bus. east / US 421 Bus. south (West Jackson Street) / SR 870 (Daniel Boone Road) – Gate City	Interchange
Scott						SR 870 (Daniel Boone Road)	
Scott		18.18	29.26			SR 65 north (Clinch River Highway) – Dungannon, Clinchport, Rye Cove	
Scott						SR 600 (Fairview Road) – Fairview	former SR 66 south; to SR 33 (TN)
Scott						SR 871 (Natural Tunnel Parkway) – Natural Tunnel State Park	
Scott	Duffield	20.85	33.55			US 58 west / US 421 north (Duff Patt Highway) / SR 871 (Natural Tunnel Parkway) – Pennington Gap, Jonesville, Cumberland Gap, Cumberland Gap National Historical Park	North end of concurrency with US 58 and US 421
Lee	No major junctions						
Wise		33.02	53.14	1	33	US 23 Bus. north / US 58 Alt. west – Big Stone Gap, Appalachia	interchange; south end of US 58 Alt. overlap
Wise		34.26	55.14	2	35	SR 610 – Big Stone Gap	interchange
City of Norton		41.45	66.71	1	42	US 23 Bus. north / US 58 Alt. Bus. east (Kentucky Avenue) / SR 619 – Downtown Norton	interchange; former SR 73
City of Norton		42.94	69.11	2	44	US 58 Alt. east / US 58 Alt. Bus. west to US 23 Bus. – Coeburn, Abingdon, Downtown Norton	interchange; signed as exits 44A (west) and 44B (east) southbound; north end of concurrency with US 58 Alt.
Wise	Esserville	44.59	71.76			US 23 Bus. south (Esserville Road) / SR 757 north	
Wise	Wise	45.47	73.18			US 23 Bus. north (Norton Road) – Wise, Lonesome Pine Airport	
Wise	Glamorgan	47.43	76.33			US 23 Bus. south (West Main Street) / SR 823 (Indian Creek Road) – Wise	
Wise						SR 823 (Indian Creek Road)	
Wise		55.09	88.66			US 23 Bus. north (Indian Creek Road) to SR 83 east – Pound, Clintwood	
Wise						SR 671 (South Fork Road)	former SR 83
Wise	Pound	57.62	92.73			US 23 Bus. south (Main Street) / SR 630 – Pound, Clintwood	
Pound Gap		60.80	97.85			US 23 north – Jenkins, Pikeville	Kentucky state line
1.000 mi = 1.609 km; 1.000 km = 0.621 mi: Concurrency terminus

== Business routes ==
In Virginia, US 23 has four business routes. From South to North, its first business route serves downtown Gate City. The second begins in Big Stone Gap and runs north to Appalachia, then turns east to Norton. Its third business route runs along portions of Norton Road and West Main Street in Wise. The fourth and northernmost route is located in Pound.

U.S. Route 23
Previous state: Tennessee	Virginia	Next state: Kentucky

< SR 101	Spurs of SR 10; 1923–1928	SR 103 >
< SR 115	Spurs of SR 11; 1923–1928	SR 117 >
< SR 118	Spurs of SR 11; 1923–1928	none
< SR 105	District 1 State Routes; 1928–1933	SR 107 >
< SR 107	District 1 State Routes; 1928–1933	SR 109 >
< SR 119	District 1 State Routes; 1928–1933	SR 121 >
