= National Register of Historic Places listings in Scott County, Virginia =

Location of Scott County in Virginia

This is a list of the National Register of Historic Places listings in Scott County, Virginia.

This is intended to be a complete list of the properties and districts on the National Register of Historic Places in Scott County, Virginia, United States. The locations of National Register properties and districts for which the latitude and longitude coordinates are included below, may be seen in a Google map.

There are 10 properties and districts listed on the National Register in the county.

This National Park Service list is complete through NPS recent listings posted March 21, 2025.

== Current listings ==
	Name on the Register	Image	Date listed	Location	City or town	Description
1	Bush Mill	Bush Mill	September 5, 2008 (#08000831)	1162 Bush Mill Rd. 36°45′21″N 82°26′07″W	Nickelsville	
2	A. P. and Sara Carter House	A. P. and Sara Carter House	June 12, 1985 (#85001410)	A.P. Carter Highway; 36°40′08″N 82°24′37″W	Maces Spring	
3	A. P. Carter Homeplace	A. P. Carter Homeplace	July 30, 1976 (#76002118)	Southeast of Maces Spring near the junction of the A.P. Carter Highway and Lunsford Mill Rd. 36°40′07″N 82°24′44″W	Maces Spring	
4	A. P. Carter Store	A. P. Carter Store	June 14, 1985 (#85001411)	A.P. Carter Highway; 36°40′06″N 82°24′47″W	Maces Spring	
5	Maybelle and Ezra Carter House	Maybelle and Ezra Carter House	June 12, 1985 (#85001412)	A.P. Carter Highway; 36°40′27″N 82°24′09″W	Maces Spring	
6	Flanary Archeological Site (44SC13)	Flanary Archeological Site (44SC13)	July 7, 1983 (#83003315)	Across the Clinch River from Dungannon, directly south of the bridge 36°49′51″N 82°27′35″W	Dungannon	
7	Fulkerson-Hilton House	Fulkerson-Hilton House	September 14, 2002 (#02001006)	Dowell Gap Rd. at the North Fork of the Holston River; 36°39′02″N 82°26′35″W	Hiltons	
8	Gate City Historic District	Gate City Historic District	September 10, 2010 (#10000735)	Five blocks on E. and W. Jackson St. 36°38′18″N 82°34′48″W	Gate City	
9	Killgore Fort House	Killgore Fort House	May 19, 1972 (#72001415)	Southwest of Nickelsville off State Route 71; 36°44′05″N 82°26′03″W	Nickelsville	
10	Mt. Vernon Methodist Church	Mt. Vernon Methodist Church	June 12, 1985 (#85001413)	A.P. Carter Highway; 36°40′36″N 82°23′16″W	Maces Spring	

== See also ==
- List of National Historic Landmarks in Virginia
- National Register of Historic Places listings in Virginia
