= Virginia State Route 72 =

State highway in western Virginia, US

State Route 72

Route information
- Maintained by VDOT
- Length: 49.19 mi (79.16 km)
- Existed: July 1, 1933–present
- Tourist routes: Virginia Byway

Major junctions
- South end: SR 71 in Gate City
- SR 65 in Dungannon US 58 Alt. in Coeburn
- North end: SR 83 near Clintwood

Location
- Country: United States
- State: Virginia
- Counties: Scott, Wise, Dickenson

Highway system
- Virginia Routes; Interstate; US; Primary; Secondary; Byways; History; HOT lanes
← SR 71	→ SR 73

State Route 72 (SR 72) is a primary state highway in the southwest part of the U.S. state of Virginia. It runs from SR 71 in Gate City north to SR 65 at Fort Blackmore, northeast with SR 65 to Dungannon, and north via Coeburn to SR 83 near Clintwood.

== Route description ==
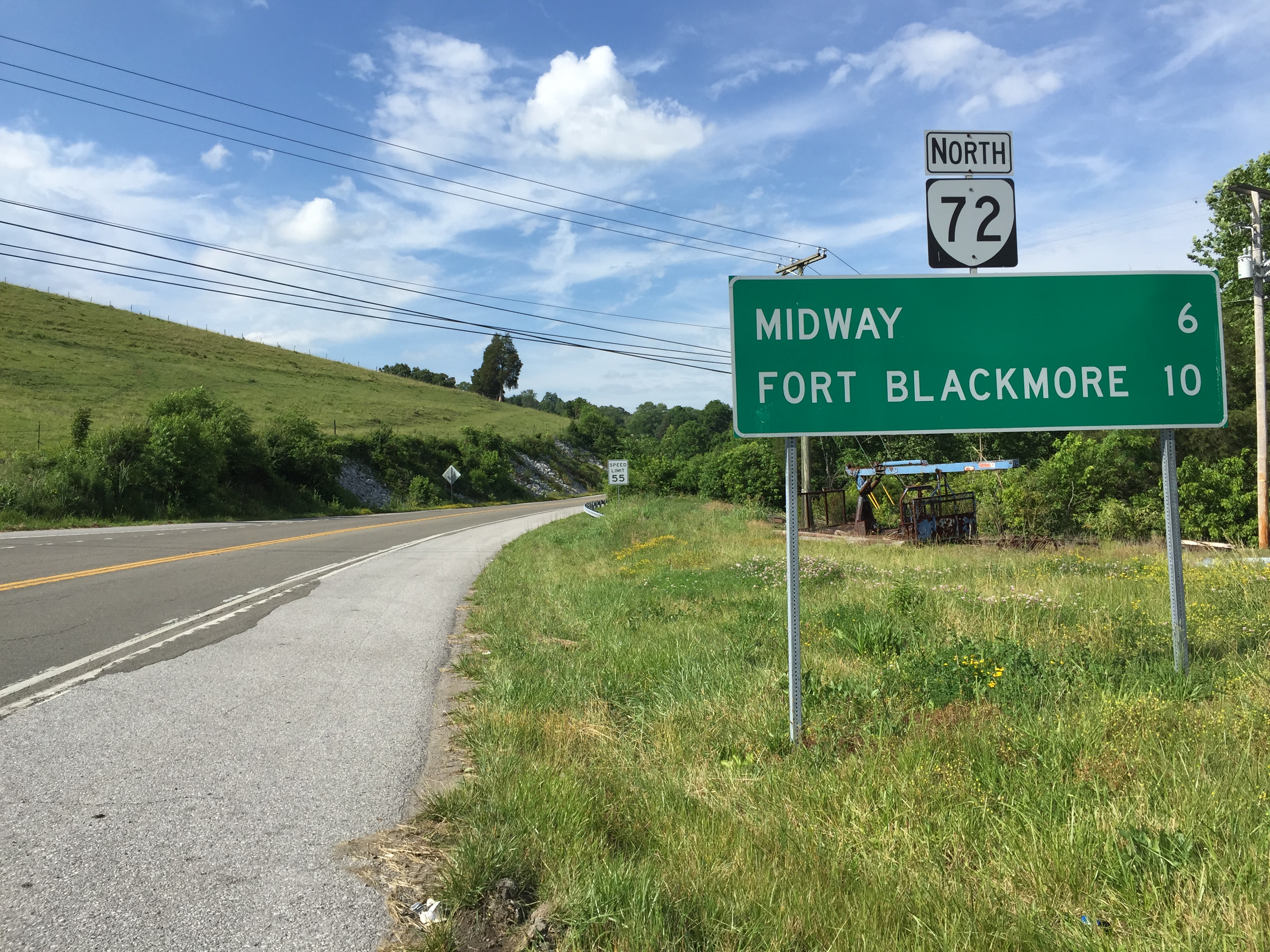
View north at the south end of SR 72 at SR 71 in Gate City

SR 72 begins at SR 71 in Slabtown, east of downtown Gate City. The intersection of the two routes lies on the town limits of Gate City. It heads north across the Moccasin Ridge via some small creek valleys and crosses Copper Creek at Williams Mill. SR 72 continues north across Copper Ridge and into the Clinch River valley, where it meets SR 65. SR 65 and SR 72 overlap, paralleling the Clinch River to Dungannon. After the two routes split, SR 72 continues to follow the river to the northeast, but then splits in order to cross Stone Mountain.

The land flattens out near the Scott–Wise county line, and SR 72 continues northwest and north across the Guest River and past Maytown to an interchange with U.S. Route 58 Alternate within the town limits of Coeburn. Signage in Coeburn directs through traffic on SR 72 to use US 58 Alt. to Front and Second Streets west of downtown Coeburn rather than using the official route on Front Street. Just 0.1 miles (0.16 km) past the interchange, SR 72 reaches SR 158 at a signalized intersection. SR 72 turns west with SR 158, formerly US 58 Alt. until a bypass around Coeburn was built, and then splits to the north. It runs alongside small creeks, passing Bondtown and Cranes Nest on its way to Fuller Gap, where it crosses Guest Mountain and the Tennessee Valley Divide. It then descends through small creek valleys and alongside the Cranes Nest River to the Dickenson County line.

SR 72 continues along the Cranes Nest River, but splits to cross a small ridge at Hibbitts Gap. Then it continues northerly alongside small creeks, past Darwin to its end at SR 83 at Georges Fork, west of Clintwood.

== History ==
The road from Coeburn north to Clintwood was part of the original state highway system designated in 1918, as a spur of SR 11 (now US 58 Alt.). In the 1923 renumbering it became part of SR 114, which continued east from Clintwood to Haysi. The piece south of Clintwood was renumbered SR 122 in the 1928 renumbering, and that same year it was extended south from Clintwood to Dungannon and southeast to end at SR 107 (now SR 71). SR 122 was renumbered SR 72 in the 1933 renumbering. In 1949, the section south of Dungannon was transferred to the secondary system as SR 774, due to its "local character and very low traffic volume" of 187 per day. (SR 774 now carries about 360 vehicles per day.) SR 72 was extended in 1986, running southwest on SR 65 to Fort Blackmore and then south to SR 71 in Gate City, taking over parts of SR 619, SR 676, SR 661, SR 710, and SR 660.

== Major intersections ==
County	Location	mi	km	Destinations	Notes
Scott	Gate City	0.00	0.00	SR 71 (Nickelsville Highway / East Jackson Street) – Nickelsville, Gate City	Southern terminus
Scott	Fort Blackmore	10.78	17.35	SR 65 south (Clinch River Highway) / SR 619 (Old Route 72) – Clinchport	Southern end of SR 65 concurrency
Scott	Dungannon	19.17	30.85	SR 65 north (Sinking Creek Highway) – St. Paul, Gate City	Northern end of SR 65 concurrency
Wise	Coeburn	30.59	49.23	US 58 Alt. – Norton	Interchange; exit 2 (US 58 Alt.)
Wise	Coeburn	30.78	49.54	SR 158 east (Front Street)	Southern end of SR 158 concurrency
Wise	Coeburn	31.43	50.58	SR 158 west (Front Street)	Northern end of SR 158 concurrency
Dickenson	Georges Fork	49.19	79.16	SR 83 (Dickenson Highway) – Pound, Clintwood, Breaks Interstate Park	Northern terminus
1.000 mi = 1.609 km; 1.000 km = 0.621 mi: Concurrency terminus

< SR 121	District 1 State Routes; 1928–1933	SR 123 >
