= Fulkerson =

Fulkerson is a surname. Notable people with the surname include:

- Aaron Fulkerson, IT businessman and founder of MindTouch, Inc
- Abram Fulkerson (1834–1902), Confederate officer during the American Civil War, Virginia lawyer, politician
- D. R. Fulkerson (1924–1976), mathematician who co-developed the Ford-Fulkerson algorithm
- Frank B. Fulkerson (1866–1936), U.S. Representative from Missouri
- Gregg Fulkerson, former leader of 80s AOR/melodic hard rock band Blue Tears
- James Fulkerson (born 1945), American composer, now living in the Netherlands

== See also ==
- Fulkerson, Missouri, an unincorporated community in the United States
- Fulkerson, Virginia, an unincorporated community in the United States
- Ford–Fulkerson algorithm computes the maximum flow in a flow network
- Fulkerson Prize for outstanding papers in the area of discrete mathematics
