= Bush mill =

Bush mill may refer to:

- bush mill, a sawmill in the Australian bush
- Bush Mill, a grist mill located in Scott County, Virginia
- Bush Mill Railway
- Bush Mill Stream Natural Area Preserve

== See also ==
- Bushmills (disambiguation)
