= Hiltons =

Hiltons may refer to:

- Hilton, New Jersey, also known as Hiltons
- Hiltons, Virginia
