= Fort Blackmore, Virginia =

Fort Blackmore
- Unincorporated community
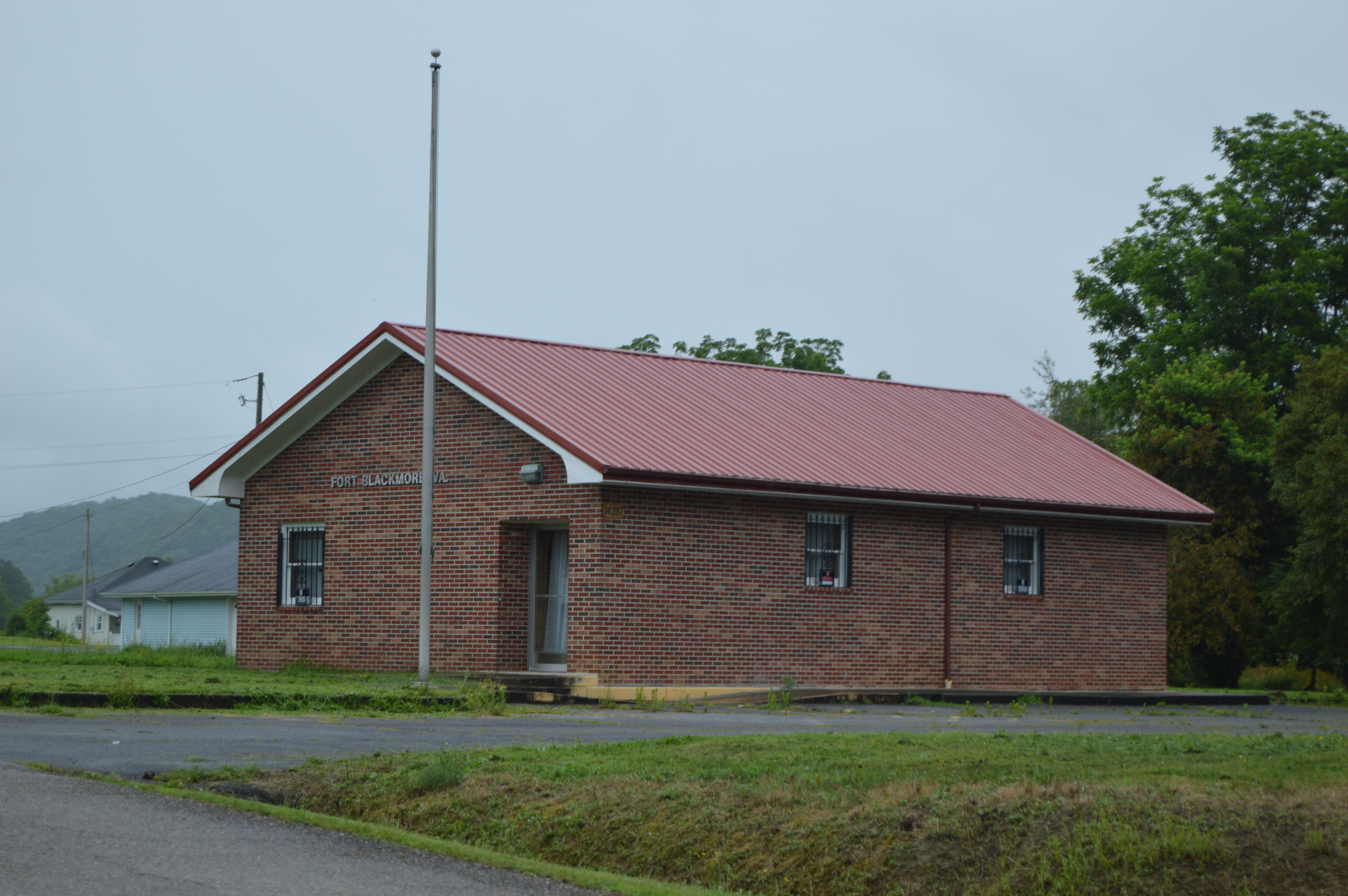
- Abandoned former post office on State Route 65

- Location within Virginia Location within the United States
- Coordinates: 36°46′28″N 82°35′13″W
- Country: United States
- State: Virginia
- County: Scott
- Elevation: 1,312 ft (400 m)
- Time zone: UTC-5 (Eastern (EST))
  - Summer (DST): UTC-4 (EDT)
- ZIP code: 24250
- Area code: 276
- GNIS feature ID: 1494936

Fort Blackmore is an unincorporated community in Scott County, Virginia, United States. Fort Blackmore is located on Virginia State Route 65, 7.6 miles (12.2 km) west-southwest of Dungannon. Fort Blackmore has a post office with ZIP code 24250.

== Notable person ==
- John King, stock car racing driver
