= Flanary Archeological Site =

Archaeological site in Virginia, United States

- Flanary Archeological Site (44SC13)
- U.S. National Register of Historic Places
- Virginia Landmarks Register
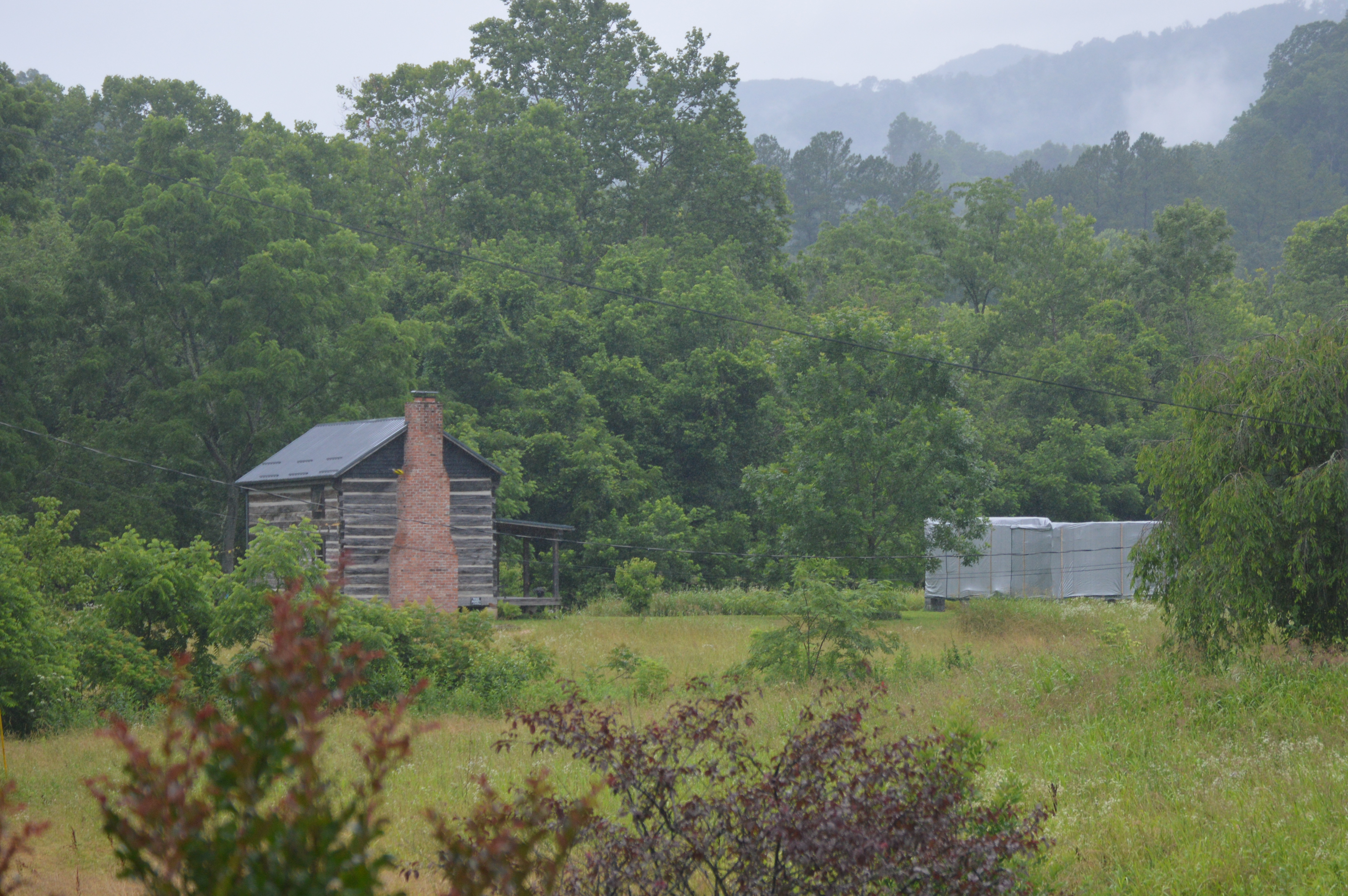
- Overview from the east in 2017
- Nearest city: Dungannon, Virginia
- Area: 6 acres (2.4 ha)
- NRHP reference No.: 83003315
- VLR No.: 084-0012

Significant dates
- Added to NRHP: July 7, 1983
- Designated VLR: September 16, 1982

Flanary Archeological Site is a landmark historic archaeological site located near Dungannon in Scott County, Virginia, United States. Located across the Clinch River from Dungannon, the site was inhabited as early as 6000 BC. It remained in periodic use by succeeding Native American cultures into the Woodland period, with occupation potentially continuing until c. AD 1600. The terminus ad quem for occupation is 1750, when Thomas Walker's expedition passed through the area and found no Indian villages.

Salvage excavations were conducted in 1977 in preparation for the construction of a bridge. These revealed that the village site, featuring posthole patterns indicating a palisade surrounding the village, lay primarily south of the bridge. A 1764 log cabin had been built near this site.

It was listed on the National Register of Historic Places in 1983.
