= Fulkerson–Hilton House =

Historic house in Virginia, United States

- U.S. National Register of Historic Places
- Virginia Landmarks Register
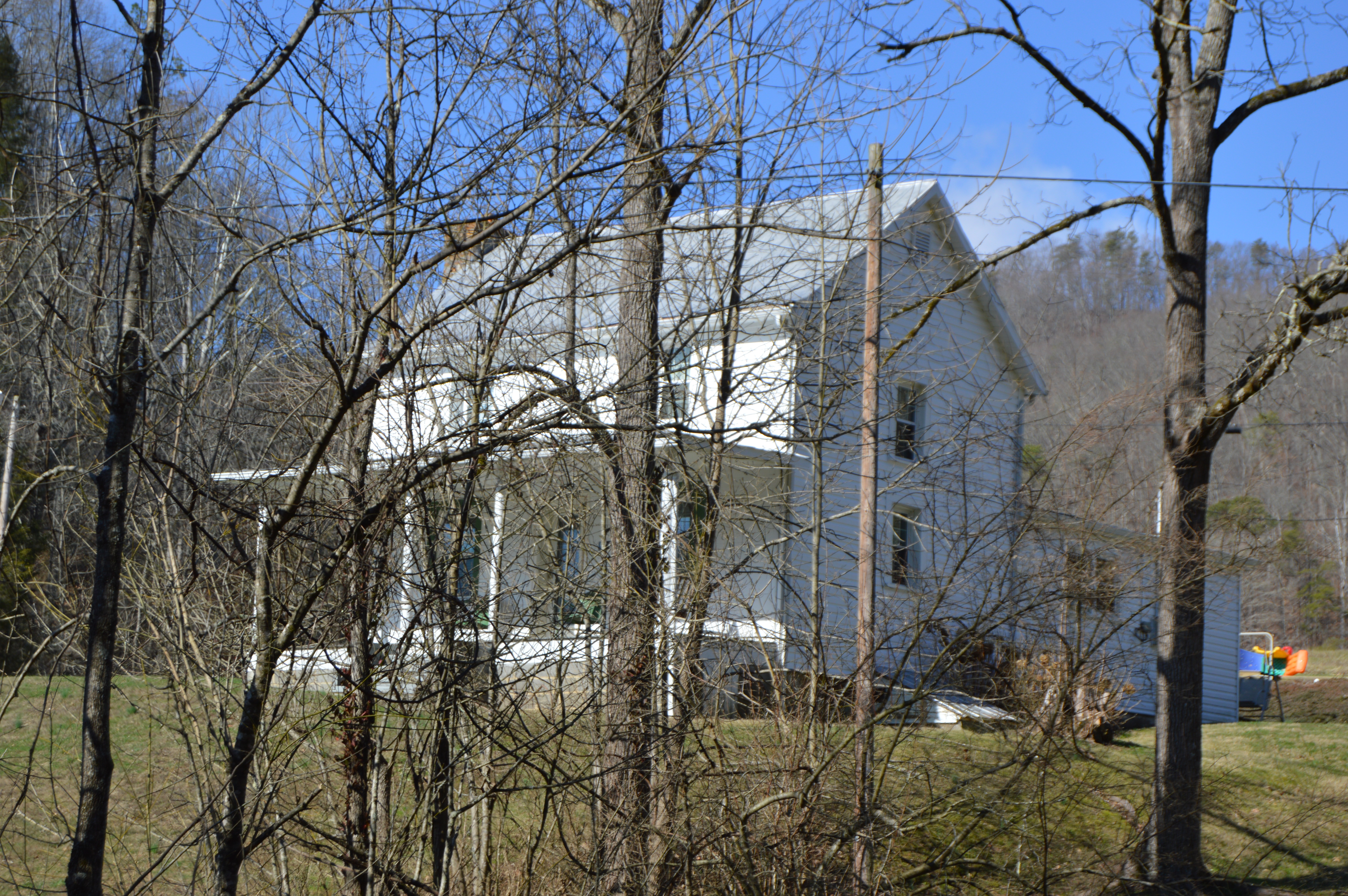
- Front and eastern side

- Location within Virginia Location within the United States
- Nearest city: Hiltons, Virginia
- Coordinates: 36°39′2″N 82°26′35″W
- Area: 85 acres (34 ha)
- Built: c. 1800
- NRHP reference No.: 02001006
- VLR No.: 084-5167

Significant dates
- Added to NRHP: September 14, 2002
- Designated VLR: March 13, 2002

The Fulkerson–Hilton House is a historic home located near Hiltons, Scott County, Virginia. It was built in 1783 according to historic records and verified by a dendrochronology study. The home is a two-story log dwelling. It is built with a mix of oak, pine, and poplar hewn logs. It measures 20 feet wide, 50 feet long, and 20 feet in height and has a standing seam metal gable roof. A front verandah was added in 1936, and a kitchen and dining room addition in 1949. Also on the property is a family cemetery including a historic marker for the home's builder Abraham Fulkerson.

It was listed on the National Register of Historic Places in 2002.
