= Snowflake, Virginia =

- Unincorporated community
- Location within Virginia Location within the United States
- Coordinates: 36°41′23″N 82°29′24″W
- Country: United States
- State: Virginia
- County: Scott
- Elevation: 1,545 ft (471 m)
- Time zone: UTC−5 (Eastern (EST))
  - Summer (DST): UTC−4 (EDT)
- Area code: 276
- GNIS feature ID: 1477766

Snowflake is an unincorporated community in Scott County, Virginia, United States. Its post office closed in April 1961.
