= Daniel Boone Cabin (Kingsport, Tennessee) =

Coordinates: 36°33′05″N 82°35′41″W

Daniel Boone Cabin is a historic log cabin museum in Kingsport, Tennessee that was occupied by pioneers Daniel Boone and Rebecca Boone from 1773 to 1775, when it was located along the Wilderness Road in Duffield, Virginia. Ephraim Fraley resided in the home after the Boones. In 1979 the cabin was moved from Duffield to the grounds of the Netherland Inn in Kingsport, where it was reassembled on the stone foundation of the Netherland slave cabin occupied by Jordan Netherland. It is currently home to a children's museum.
