= Rye Cove, Virginia =

Unincorporated community in Virginia, US

Coordinates: 36°43′31″N 82°41′47″W

Rye Cove is an unincorporated community in Scott County, Virginia, United States. Rye Cove is known for its 1929 tornado, which killed at least 13 people and is the deadliest tornado in Virginia history.

Rye Cove High School is part of Scott County School District.
