= Netherland Inn =

- Netherland Inn and Complex
- U.S. National Register of Historic Places
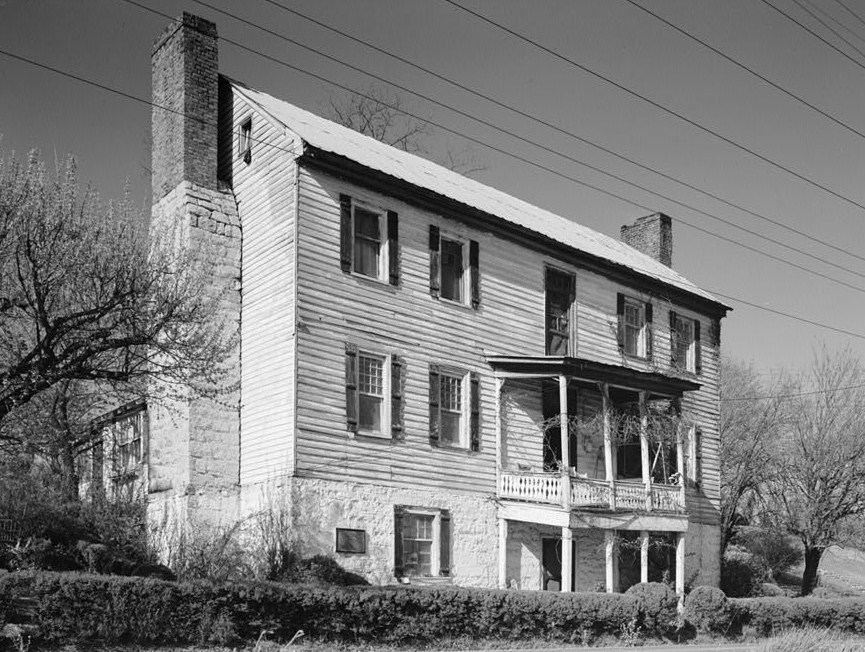
- Netherland Inn, 1964

- Location within Tennessee
- Location: 2144 Netherland Inn Road, Kingsport, Tennessee
- Coordinates: 36°33′4.03″N 82°35′40.84″W
- Built: 1802
- Architectural style: Federal
- NRHP reference No.: 69000182
- Added to NRHP: December 23, 1969

The Netherland Inn and Complex is a historic house museum in Kingsport, Tennessee, United States. Built in 1802 to serve as a boat yard for salt distribution, the property was eventually sold, and in 1818 it became the Netherland Inn, serving travelers en route from Middle Tennessee to Western Kentucky. The inn and boatyard is the only place on the National Register of Historic Places that served as a stage stop and a boatyard.

== History ==
The building was built in 1802, and then expanded in 1808, by William King. King built it with the goal of creating a boatyard to ship the salt he produced. The building was sold in 1818 to Richard Netherland, who built Netherland Inn as it exists today: a 3-story building with an inn and a tavern on Great Old Stage Road, the main route between Western Kentucky and Middle Tennessee. Notable people such as Andrew Jackson, Andrew Johnson, and James Polk visited the inn. Prominent state legislator John Netherland, a son of Richard, grew up at the inn.

The inn stayed in the Netherland family until 1906, when it was acquired by H.C. and Nettie Cloud, who used it as a boarding house and their own home. In 1968, it was bought by the Netherland Inn Association, who preserved the building as a historic house museum. The inn and boatyard was placed on the National Register of Historic Places on December 23, 1969, and is the only site that has served as both a boatyard and a stagestop.

== Today ==
The inn is an example of American frontier settlement, using documentation from the journals of Richard Netherland and related resources, to develop its museum experience. The first floor is a tavern, the second family quarters, and the third floor is guest rooms, all depicted as they would have been in during the early 19th century. The majority of the original contents of the inn were destroyed during the American Civil War, however, selected pieces in the museum's collection are original. The Daniel Boone Cabin was moved to the grounds in 1979 and is currently a children's museum.
