= Bushmills =

Bushmills may refer to:

- Bushmills, County Antrim, a village in Northern Ireland
- Bushmills, a brand of Irish whiskey produced in the Northern Irish village at the Old Bushmills Distillery

== See also ==
- Bush mill (disambiguation)
