= 1929 Rye Cove tornado outbreak =

Weather event in the United States

Meteorological history
- Duration: May 1–2, 1929

Tornado outbreak
- Tornadoes: 17
- Max. rating: F3 tornado
- Duration: 30 hours, 25 minutes

Overall effects
- Casualties: ≥ 42 fatalities, ≥ 323 injuries
- Damage: Unknown
- Areas affected: Central and Eastern United States

The 1929 Rye Cove tornado outbreak was a deadly tornado outbreak (Note: An outbreak is generally defined as a group of at least six tornadoes (the number sometimes varies slightly according to local climatology) with no more than a six-hour gap between individual tornadoes. An outbreak sequence, prior to (after) modern records that began in 1950, is defined as, at most, two (one) consecutive days without at least one significant (F2 or stronger) tornado.) (Note: All damage totals are in 1929 United States dollars unless otherwise noted.) that swept from southwest to northeast along the Appalachian Mountains from Oklahoma to Maryland in early May 1929. This outbreak, which killed at least 42 people and injured at least 323, is notable as one of the worst to affect the states of Maryland and Virginia. It is also one of the most intense tornado outbreaks to affect Appalachia. The F2 tornado that struck Rye Cove, Virginia, is the deadliest tornado in Virginia history and tied for the thirteenth-deadliest to hit a school in the United States, with all 13 deaths in a school building. Western Virginia was particularly hard hit, with additional tornadoes confirmed in Alleghany, Bath, Culpeper, Fauquier and Loudoun Counties. One of these tornadoes, near Culpeper, also destroyed a school, but the storm struck during the evening after classes had been dismissed for the day.

== Confirmed tornadoes ==
Confirmed tornadoes by Fujita rating
FU	F0	F1	F2	F3	F4	F5	Total
3	?	?	9	5	0	0	17

=== May 1 event ===
F#	Location	County	Time (UTC)	Path length	Damage
Oklahoma
F2	Tucker to SE of Van Buren, AR	LeFlore, Sequoyah, Sebastian (AR), Crawford (AR)	2015	30 miles (48 km)	This tornado first touched down close to Moffett, Oklahoma, where it injured three structures. Observers witnessed four funnel clouds passing over the south fringe of Fort Smith, Arkansas, causing damage to three factories and 17 houses. The tornado razed six houses along the shores of Hollis Lake before dissipating.
Arkansas
FU	Jethro	Franklin	2025	12 miles (19 km)	Tornado-related damage reported.
F2	Rex	Van Buren	2130	5 miles (8.0 km)	This tornado struck the entire community of Rex, tearing off roofs and damaging every structure in its path.
F3	W of Brinkley to N of Wheatley	Monroe, St. Francis	0045	15 miles (24 km)	9 deaths – This deadly tornado struck several plantations, damaging or leveling 45 small houses, though some larger ones were razed as well, and other structures, along with crops, were reportedly damaged.
Texas
FU	Frankston	Anderson	2100	unknown	Tornado damage reported.
Sources: Grazulis, Monthly Weather Review

=== May 2 event ===
F#	Location	County	Time (UTC)	Path length	Damage
Tennessee
FU	W of Newport	Cocke	unknown	unknown	This first member of a tornado family developed 15 mi (24 km) west of Newport.
F2	Embreeville area	Washington, Unicoi	1700	unknown	2 deaths – This was another member of the tornado family previously listed. The tornado struck 15 mountaintop houses - with six of them leveled - near the Washington–Unicoi county line.
Virginia
F2	NW of Gate City (Rye Cove area)	Scott	1755	4 miles (6.4 km)	13 deaths – See section on this tornado
F3	S of Woodville to Flint Hill	Rappahannock	2030	13 miles (21 km)	3 deaths – A tornado struck Woodville and destroyed several houses. One student died and 15 others were injured when a school was destroyed, with some of the students carried 200 yd (183 m) away from the school. Two other people were killed when the tornado destroyed houses in Flint Hill.
F2	NE of Iron Gate	Alleghany, Bath	2300	17 miles (27 km)	A tornado struck several small, rural communities, including Coronation, Sitlington, and Nimrod Hall where it damaged or destroyed at least 13 farms and small houses near the Cowpasture River.
F2	Near Hamilton	Loudoun	0030	2 miles (3.2 km)	A tornado destroyed at least one house and numerous barns. A brick church and other structures were damaged.
F3	Lagrange to near Catlett	Culpeper, Fauquier	0100	18 miles (29 km)	6+ deaths – A tornado struck a small house at Lagrange, killing two people inside. Four - possibly five - people were killed in two houses that were destroyed, and six other houses were damaged or destroyed in Weaversville. The tornado also destroyed a large, fourteen-room, brick structure.
Ohio
F2	Galloway area to Columbus	Franklin	2000	10 miles (16 km)	2 deaths – A tornado tore the roofs off several houses as it passed between Galloway and Columbus; in Columbus, the tornado leveled a gas station and killed two people when it partially destroyed a jail.
Florida
F2	Jacksonville area	Duval	2120	2 miles (3.2 km)	1 death – A tornado struck Jacksonville Heights and Ortega, on the south side of the Jacksonville, where it destroyed seven houses, damaged 15 others, and killed one person in a barn.
West Virginia
F2	Morgantown area	Monongalia	2120	4 miles (6.4 km)	A tornado struck the Evansdale and Riverside portions of Morgantown where it demolished 35 houses and caused minor damage to 200 others in addition to multiple factories. Fifteen people reportedly incurred serious injuries occurred.
Maryland
F3	NW of Adamstown to near Taneytown	Frederick, Carroll	0030	33 miles (53 km)	2 deaths – A skipping tornado killed a couple as it leveled a farmhouse 3 miles (4.8 km) west of Frederick. Six other homes were damaged with some of them being unroofed.
F3	Near Laytonsville to Brookeville	Montgomery, Howard	0230	10 miles (16 km)	4 deaths– A tornado destroyed six farmhouses, killing three people in one of the leveled houses. A fourth person died on the second floor of a house that was torn off during the storm.
Source: Grazulis, Monthly Weather Review

=== Rye Cove, Virginia ===
Rye Cove, Virginia
F2 tornado
- on the Fujita scale

Overall effects
- Casualties: 13 fatalities, 100 injuries
- Damage: US$100,000 (1929)

At 12:55 p.m. (EDT), as many as 155 students were attending classes at Rye Cove High School, near the town of Clinchport, when a strong thunderstorm approached from the southwest and produced a tornado just 0.5 mi (0.80 km) away. As the tornado - referred to as a “dark cloud” - approached the school, it intensified and tore the roofs off many structures. Strong winds lofted lumber for hundreds of yards, leaving pieces lodged in trees. Next to the school, the tornado struck a log house that was built in the 1850s, picking up the entire structure and carrying some of its furniture up to 4 mi (6.4 km) away.

A teacher at the seven-room, wooden school heard the wind increasing outside but did not alert her students. Moments later, the tornado struck, reportedly causing it to “explode” and violently spread debris over a wide area. The powerful storm killed one teacher and 12 students, carrying their bodies up to 75 yards (69 m) from the school’s limestone foundation. After the devastation at the school, the 0.25 mi (0.40 km)-wide tornado destroyed five farmhouses before lifting.

The legacy of the tornado lived on in local folklore as A. P. Carter of the Carter Family, having visited the storm-stricken area and assisted in relief efforts, immediately recorded a song about the storm.

== See also ==
- List of North American tornadoes and tornado outbreaks
