= Kilgore Fort House =

Historic house in Virginia, United States

- Killgore Fort House
- U.S. National Register of Historic Places
- Virginia Landmarks Register
- Kilgore Fort House about 1930

- Location within Virginia Location within the United States
- Nearest city: Nickelsville, Virginia
- Coordinates: 36°44′5″N 82°26′3″W
- Area: 1.8 acres (0.73 ha)
- Built: 1785
- NRHP reference No.: 72001415
- VLR No.: 084-0003

Significant dates
- Added to NRHP: May 19, 1972
- Designated VLR: January 18, 1972

The Kilgore Fort House is a historic site located in Scott County, Virginia on Route 71 in Nicklesville, Virginia. Fort houses were built to provide protection for individual families during the period from 1773 to about 1795 when attacks by Native Americans on the pioneer settlers were common. The Kilgore Fort House was built about 1790 by the Reverend Robert Kilgore, and is the only surviving example of its type in southwest Virginia.

The Kilgore Fort House was restored in 1973–74. There are two stories, with two rooms on each story. The rooms on each floor were separated by a timber partition. The rooms have been arranged so that if they were attacked they could retreat into the next, until a final stand could be made in the northeast room of the second floor. The original building was constructed without windows, but had small openings for gun ports, which feature emphasizes its defensive purpose. The doors were made of heavy timbers and inside held shut with a heavy bar. The house was made of trimmed white oak log timbers, each of which was notched at the end to receive the timber from the adjacent wall. Gaps between timbers were chinked with mud. A large stone fireplace and chimney on the northeast side was provided for cooking and heating.

Despite its obvious defensive design, there is no record of the fort house being attacked by Indians. A story persists in the county that Cherokee Indians once camped on the far bank of Copper Creek, but that is unlikely since the far bank is a cliff. The fort house is on a natural crossing on Copper Creek that is still used today. Older residents remember when cars would ford the creek at this spot; at least two bridges, including the current one, have been built here. Unused bridge pilings still exist in the creek.

The Kilgore Fort House is also called the Kilgore Fort, but unlike the popular idea of a frontier fort, it had no walls around it. Instead it is simply a log home designed for defense, hence the term fort house.
