= Fulkerson, Virginia =

Unincorporated community in Virginia, US

Coordinates: 36°39′45″N 82°26′05″W

Fulkerson is an unincorporated community in Scott County, in the U.S. state of Virginia.

== History ==
A post office called Fulkerson was established in 1860, and remained in operation until it was discontinued in 1889. The community was named for early residents James and Abraham Fulkerson.
