= Natural Tunnel State Park =

State park in Virginia, US

Natural Tunnel
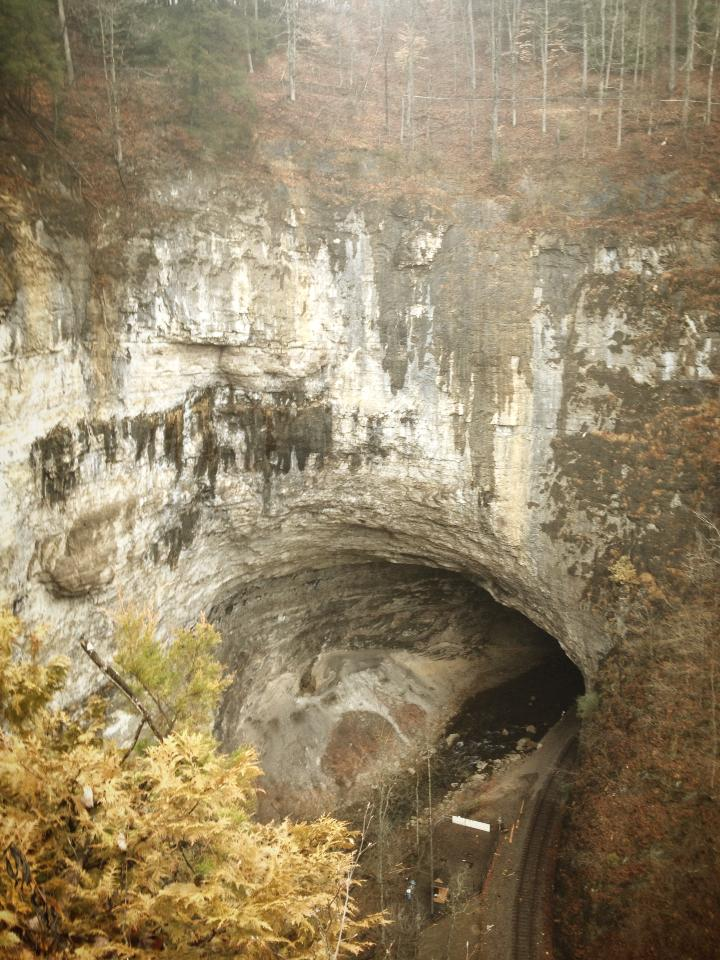
- The Natural Tunnel, still in use as a railroad tunnel
- Interactive map of Natural Tunnel

Overview
- Location: Natural Tunnel State Park, Scott County, Virginia, United States
- Coordinates: 36.703°N 82.743°W

Operation
- Constructed: 1893
- Opened: 1894
- Owner: Commonwealth of Virginia
- Operator: Norfolk Southern Railway Company
- Traffic: Coal Haulage
- Character: Naturally formed limestone cave converted to a railroad tunnel

Technical
- Length: 838 feet (255 m)
- Track gauge: 1,435 mm (4 ft 8 1/2 in)
- Electrified: No
- Tunnel clearance: Portals: 50 feet (15 m); Max: 80 feet (24 m)

Natural Tunnel State Park is a Virginia state park, centered on the Natural Tunnel, a massive naturally formed cave that is so large it is used as a railroad tunnel. It is located in the Appalachian Mountains near Duffield in Scott County, Virginia.

The Natural Tunnel, which is up to 200 feet (61 m) wide and 80 feet (24 m) high, began to form more than a million years ago when groundwater bearing carbonic acid percolated through crevices and slowly dissolved limestone and dolomite bedrock. A small river, which is now called Stock Creek, was diverted underground and it continued to erode the tunnel over many millennia.

The walls of the tunnel show evidence of prehistoric life. Many fossils have been found in the creek bed and in the tunnel walls.

== Geology ==
The tunnel passes through Purchase Ridge, which is made of the Ordovician Chepultepec Limestone and is near the axis of the Purchase Ridge syncline. It lies between the Clinchport Thrust Fault and the Hunter Valley Thrust Fault, on the Hunter Valley Thrust Sheet. The tunnel itself began its formation in the Pleistocene period.

== History ==
A popular legend tells of a Cherokee maiden and a Shawnee warrior who had been forbidden to marry by their respective tribes, jumped to their deaths from the highest pinnacle above the Natural Tunnel. The place is now known as Lover's Leap.

Although Natural Tunnel State Park was created in 1967 and opened to the public in 1971, the Natural Tunnel has been a Virginian tourist attraction for more than a century; Daniel Boone is reputed to have been the first European to see it in the 18th century. The 41st United States Secretary of State William Jennings Bryan dubbed it the "Eighth Wonder of the World".

The South Atlantic and Ohio railroad constructed tracks through the Natural Tunnel in 1893, and the first train passed through the following year. In 1899, the Natural Tunnel was purchased by the Tennessee & Carolina Iron and Steel Company. The railway originally carried passenger trains; today, the line is still open but now operated by Norfolk Southern Railway Company (NS), also used under trackage rights by CSX Transportation, Inc. (CSXT), and is only used to transport coal.

== Park facilities ==
There is a 1,600-foot (500 m) boardwalk that allows disabled visitors to gain access to the tunnel.

Park visitors can also camp, swim, picnic and hike. There is a visitors center and naturally formed amphitheaters that are up to 600 feet (180 m) high.

=== Natural Tunnel State Park Trails ===
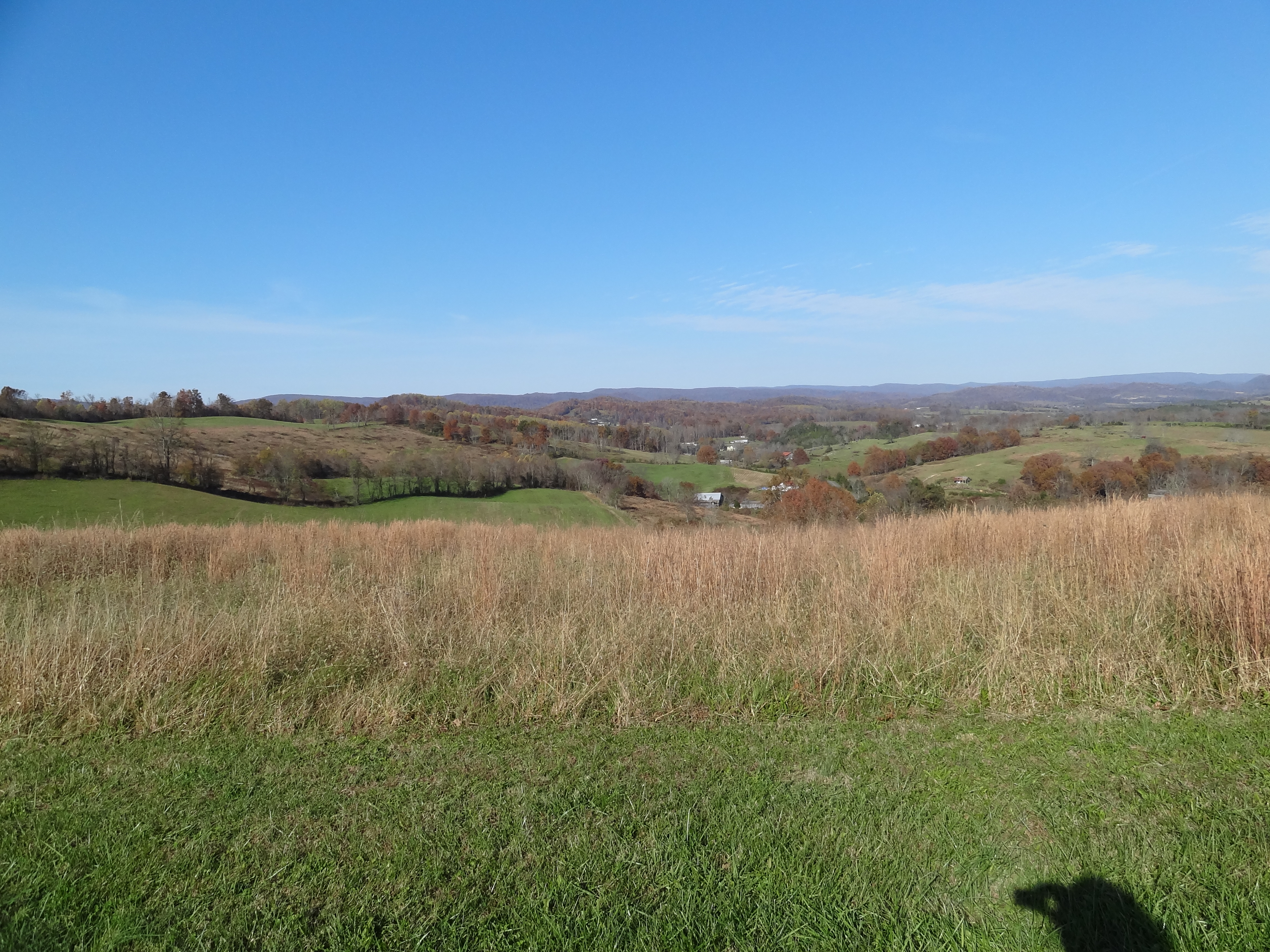
View from one of the trails

Trail Name	Length	Difficulty
Tunnel Hill Trail	0.7 miles (1.1 km)	Easy/Moderate
Tunnel Trail into Gorge	0.3 miles (0.48 km)	Difficult
Lover's Leap Trail	0.4 miles (0.64 km)	Moderate
Gorge Ridge Trail	0.5 miles (0.80 km)	Moderate
Purchase Ridge Trail	1.1 miles (1.8 km)	Difficult
Spring Hollow Trail	0.3 miles (0.48 km)	Difficult
Birding and Wildlife Trail	0.7 miles (1.1 km)	Moderate

== See also ==
- List of Virginia state parks
