= Aaron Fulkerson =

American businessman

Aaron Roe Fulkerson
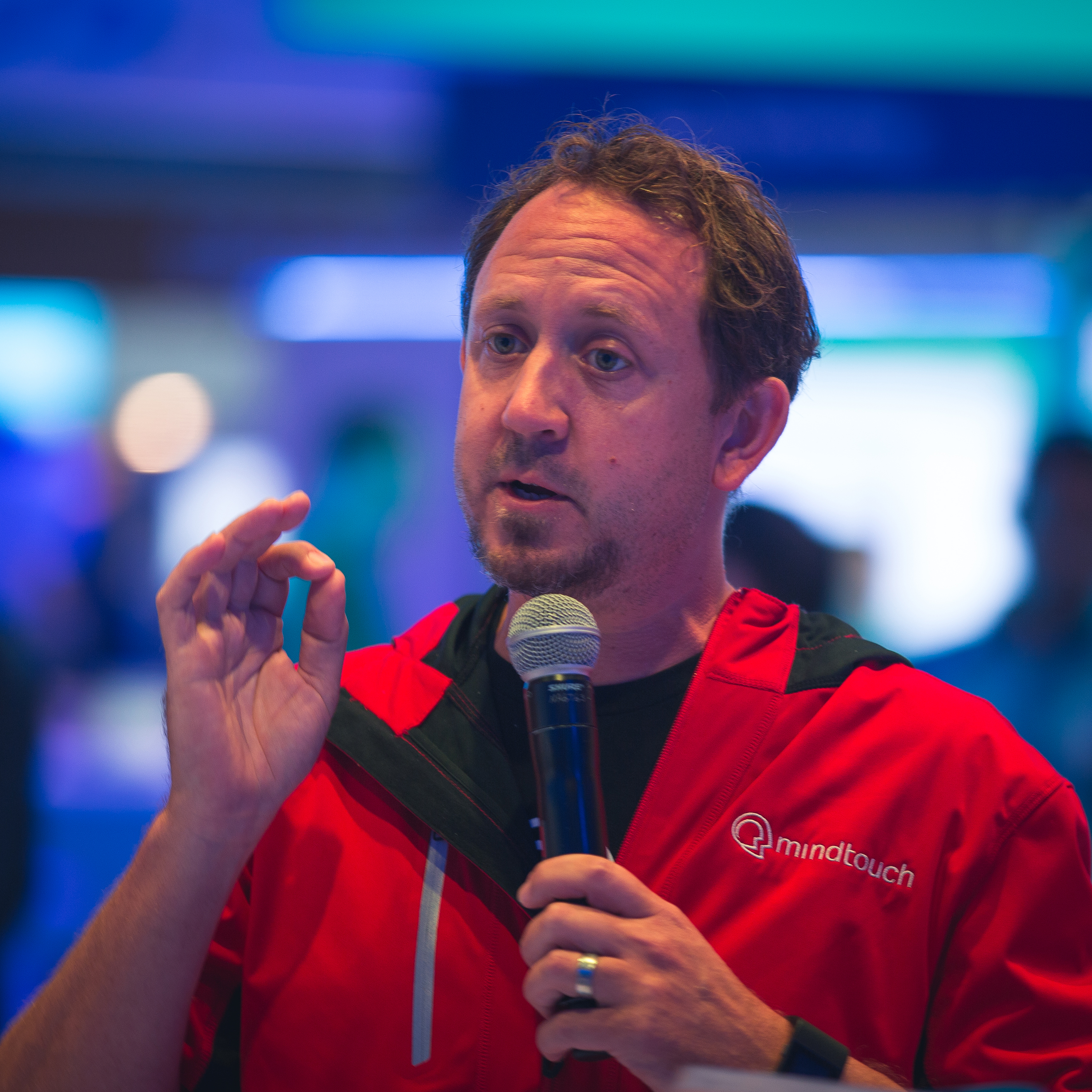
- Born: Orange, CA, United States
- Education: University of North Carolina at Chapel Hill
- Occupation: Chief Executive Officer

Aaron Roe Fulkerson is an American information technology businessman and founder of MindTouch, Inc. Fulkerson helped pioneer the open core business model, collaborative networks, and the application of Web Oriented Architecture to enterprise software.

Fulkerson is founder and board member at MindTouch, a supplier of open source and collaborative network software. Prior to co-founding MindTouch with Steve Bjorg, Aaron was a member of Microsoft’s Advanced Strategies and Policies division, and worked on distributed systems research. Previously, he owned and operated a successful software and Information Technology consulting firm, Gurion Digital LLP. He won a Jack Kent Cooke Foundation scholarship in 2002.

Aaron advises Microsoft on open source practices, and is a founding advisory member of the OuterCurve Foundation (formerly known as the CodePlex Foundation). He is also the technical editor to MCGraw Hill's "Implementing Enterprise 2.0." Aaron is a contributing blogger and writer for Forbes, GigaOm OSTATIC, TechWeb Internet Evolution, Fortune Magazine, CNNMoney.com, CMSWire and ReadWriteWeb.

In 2008, Aaron was cited one of seven "Leading Corporate Social Media Evangelists" by ReadWriteWeb. Aaron is also a frequent speaker on the topics of enterprise software, Enterprise 2.0, Social CRM (SCRM), open source, education, and entrepreneurship,

In March 2010, he was named on the Mindtouch website as the forty-sixth in the list of "Most Powerful Voices in Open Source".
