= Weber City, Virginia =

Weber City
- Town
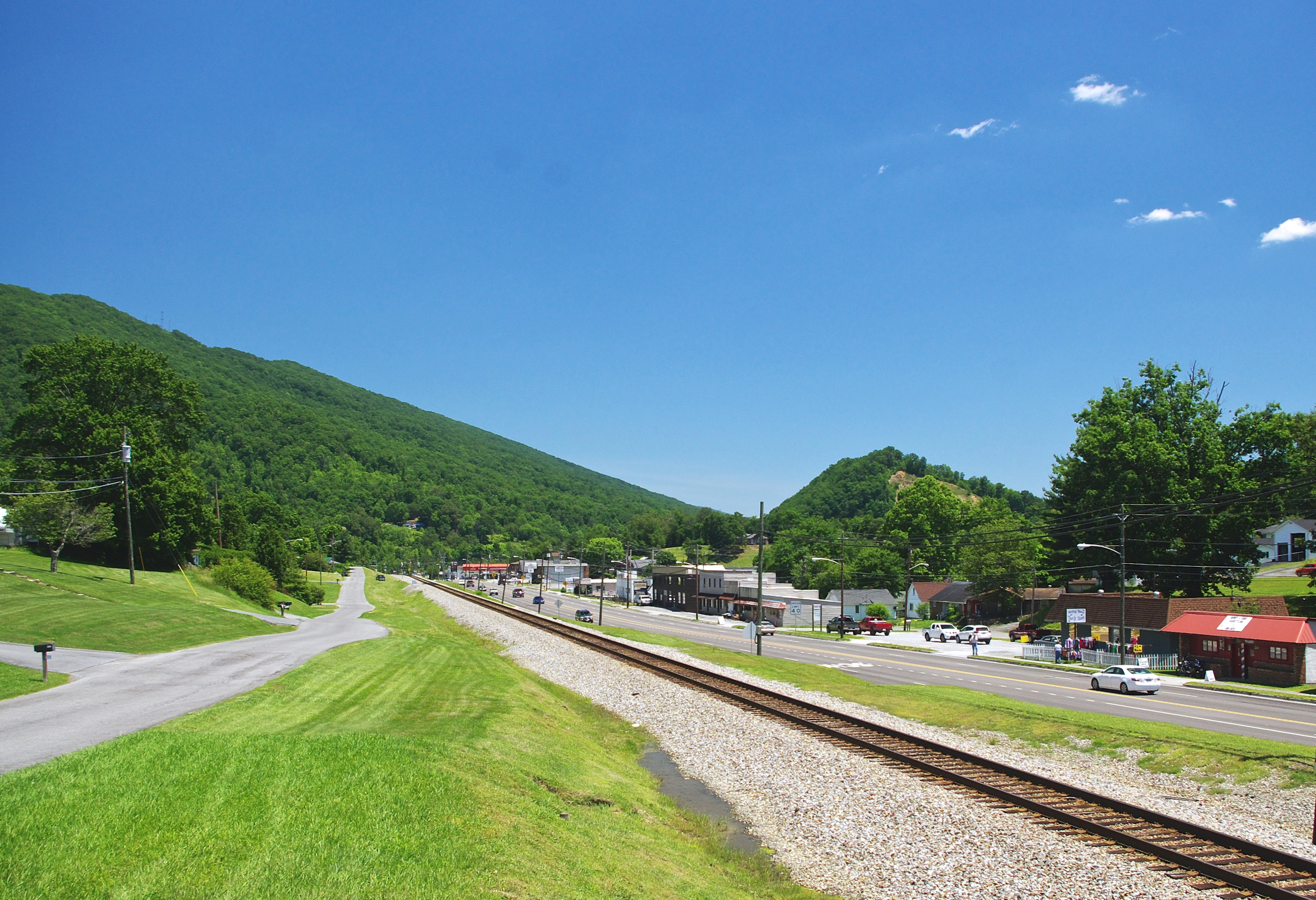
- Railroad tracks and businesses along US 23 in Weber City

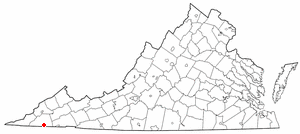
- Location of Weber City, Virginia
- Coordinates: 36°37′24″N 82°33′40″W
- Country: United States
- State: Virginia
- County: Scott

Government
  - Type: Mayor - council government
  - Mayor: Justin Addington

Area
  - Total: 1.73 sq mi (4.47 km^{2})
  - Land: 1.71 sq mi (4.43 km^{2})
  - Water: 0.012 sq mi (0.03 km^{2})
- Elevation: 1,306 ft (398 m)

Population (2020)
  - Total: 1,250
  - Density: 731/sq mi (282/km^{2})
- Time zone: UTC−5 (Eastern (EST))
  - Summer (DST): UTC−4 (EDT)
- ZIP code: 24290
- Area code: 276
- FIPS code: 51-83808
- GNIS feature ID: 1476430
- Website: webercityva.org

Weber City is an incorporated town in Scott County, Virginia, United States. The population was 1,250 at the 2020 census. It is part of the Kingsport–Bristol (TN)–Bristol (VA) Metropolitan Statistical Area, which is a component of the Johnson City–Kingsport–Bristol, TN-VA Combined Statistical Area – commonly known as the "Tri-Cities" region.

== Etymology ==
The area was known as "Moccasin Gap" after the local gap that US 23 runs through. Local businessman Frank Parker Sr. heard the future name on the Amos 'n' Andy radio show during a skit involving the upscale real estate development of "Weber City." As a joke, Parker erected a sign outside his service station on US 23 that read "Welcome to Weber City." However, by the time the town was incorporated in 1954, the area had become known locally as "Weber City." As such, the name was chosen for the new town.

== Geography ==
Weber City is located at 36°37′24″N 82°33′40″W (36.623284, −82.561039).

According to the United States Census Bureau, the town has a total area of 1.1 square miles (2.8 km^{2}), all land.

Weber City is located on the southern side of Moccasin Gap, a natural break in the mountains caused by Big Moccasin Creek, which was used by pioneers headed into Tennessee. To the south of Weber City, another gap leads into Tennessee. US 23 is the main road through Weber City and a primary north–south corridor for western Virginia.

== Demographics ==
Historical population
Census	Pop.	Note	%±
1960	1,274		—
1970	1,676		31.6%
1980	1,543		−7.9%
1990	1,377		−10.8%
2000	1,333		−3.2%
2010	1,327		−0.5%
2020	1,250		−5.8%
U.S. Decennial Census

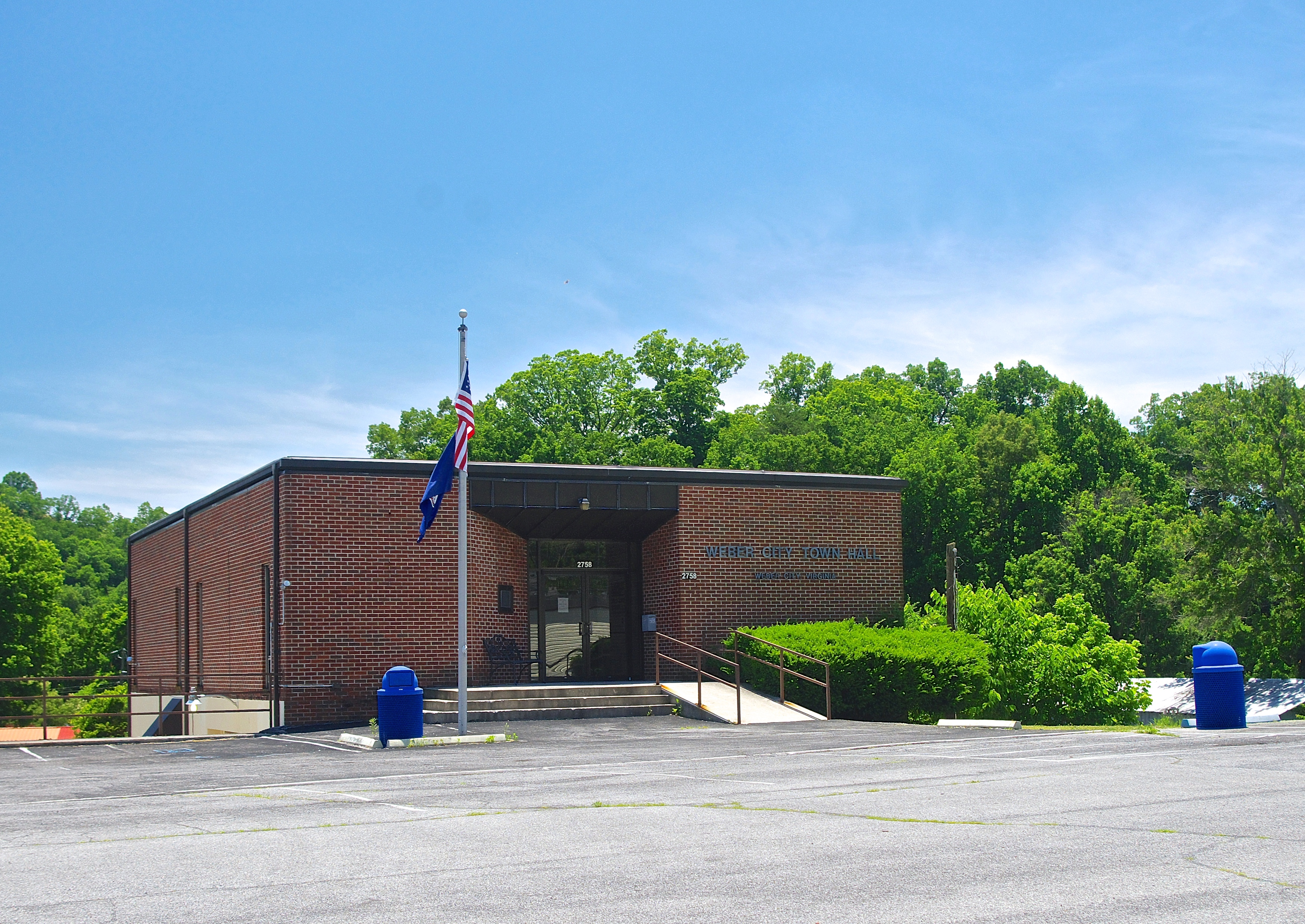
Weber City Town Hall

As of the census of 2000, there were 1,333 people, 605 households, and 382 families residing in the town. The population density was 1,170.5 inhabitants per square mile (451.9/km^{2}). There were 689 housing units at an average density of 605.0 units per square mile (233.6 units/km^{2}). The racial makeup of the town was 98.35% White, 0.90% African American, 0.08% Native American, 0.30% from other races, and 0.38% from two or more races. Hispanic or Latino of any race were 0.30% of the population.

There were 605 households, out of which 20.2% had children under the age of 18 living with them, 47.4% were married couples living together, 12.9% had a female householder with no husband present, and 36.7% were non-families. 34.7% of all households were made up of individuals, and 18.0% had someone living alone who was 65 years of age or older. The average household size was 2.08 and the average family size was 2.64.

In the town, the population was spread out, with 16.7% under the age of 18, 7.9% from 18 to 24, 22.4% from 25 to 44, 25.3% from 45 to 64, and 27.7% who were 65 years of age or older. The median age was 47 years. For every 100 females, there were 78.0 males. For every 100 females aged 18 and over, there were 76.5 males.

The median income for a household in the town was $25,744, and the median income for a family was $35,833. Males had a median income of $33,958 versus $21,726 for females. The per capita income for the town was $15,856. About 11.1% of families and 14.1% of the population were below the poverty line, including 20.9% of those under age 18 and 10.4% of those age 65 or over.
