= Duffield, Virginia =

Duffield
- Town
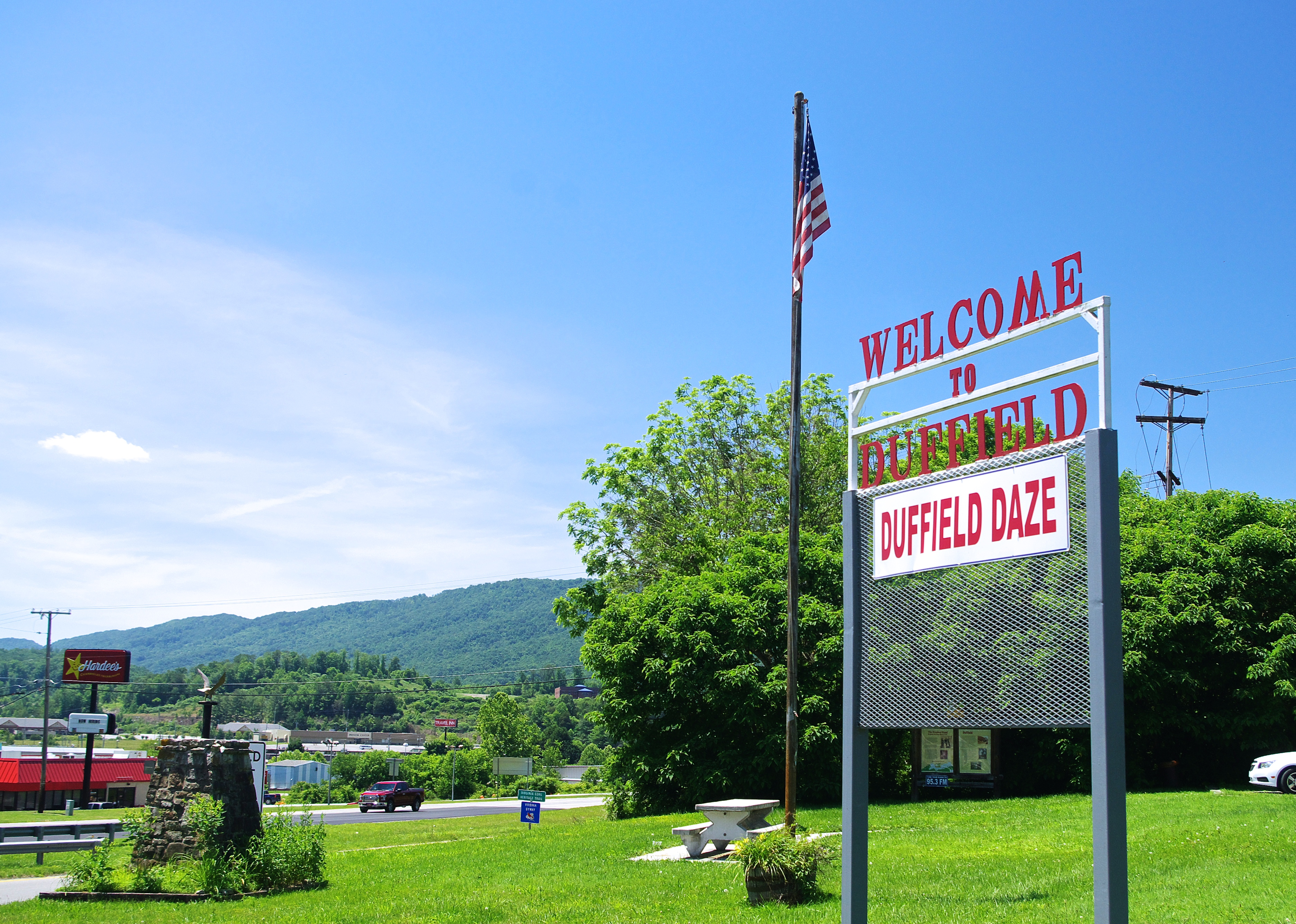
- Welcome sign in Duffield

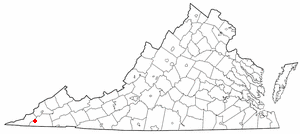
- Location of Duffield, Virginia
- Coordinates: 36°43′11″N 82°47′51″W
- Country: United States
- State: Virginia
- County: Scott

Area
  - Total: 0.61 sq mi (1.59 km^{2})
  - Land: 0.61 sq mi (1.59 km^{2})
  - Water: 0 sq mi (0.00 km^{2})
- Elevation: 1,437 ft (438 m)

Population (2020)
  - Total: 73
  - Density: 120/sq mi (46/km^{2})
- Time zone: UTC−5 (Eastern (EST))
  - Summer (DST): UTC−4 (EDT)
- ZIP code: 24244
- Area code: 276
- FIPS code: 51-23680
- GNIS feature ID: 1483156

Duffield is a town in Scott County, Virginia, United States. The population was 73 at the 2020 census. It is part of the Kingsport-Bristol-Bristol, TN-VA Metropolitan Statistical Area, which is a component of the Johnson City-Kingsport-Bristol, TN-VA Combined Statistical Area – commonly known as the "Tri-Cities" region.

== Geography ==
Duffield is located at 36°43′11″N 82°47′51″W (36.719642, −82.797393).

According to the United States Census Bureau, the town has a total area of 0.6 square miles (1.6 km^{2}), all land.

== Demographics ==
Historical population
Census	Pop.	Note	%±
1900	98		—
1910	122		24.5%
1920	120		−1.6%
1930	170		41.7%
1940	83		−51.2%
1950	176		112.0%
1960	97		−44.9%
1970	63		−35.1%
1980	148		134.9%
1990	54		−63.5%
2000	62		14.8%
2010	91		46.8%
2020	73		−19.8%
2025 (est.)	68	▼	−6.8%
U.S. Decennial Census 2020

At the 2000 census there were 62 people, 25 households, and 20 families living in the town. The population density was 107.6 inhabitants per square mile (41.5/km^{2}). There were 30 housing units at an average density of 52.1 units per square mile (20.1 units/km^{2}). The racial makeup of the town was 100.00% White. Of the 25 households 24.0% had children under the age of 18 living with them, 68.0% were married couples living together, 12.0% had a female householder with no husband present, and 20.0% were non-families. 20.0% of households were one person and 8.0% were one person aged 65 or older. The average household size was 2.48 and the average family size was 2.85.

The age distribution was 21.0% under the age of 18, 4.8% from 18 to 24, 25.8% from 25 to 44, 35.5% from 45 to 64, and 12.9% 65 or older. The median age was 44 years. For every 100 females, there were 82.4 males. For every 100 females age 18 and over, there were 88.5 males.

The median household income was $27,500 and the median family income was $29,375. Males had a median income of $29,000 versus $15,938 for females. The per capita income for the town was $12,046. There were no families and 6.3% of the population living below the poverty line, including no under eighteens and 33.3% of those over 64.

== Points of interest ==
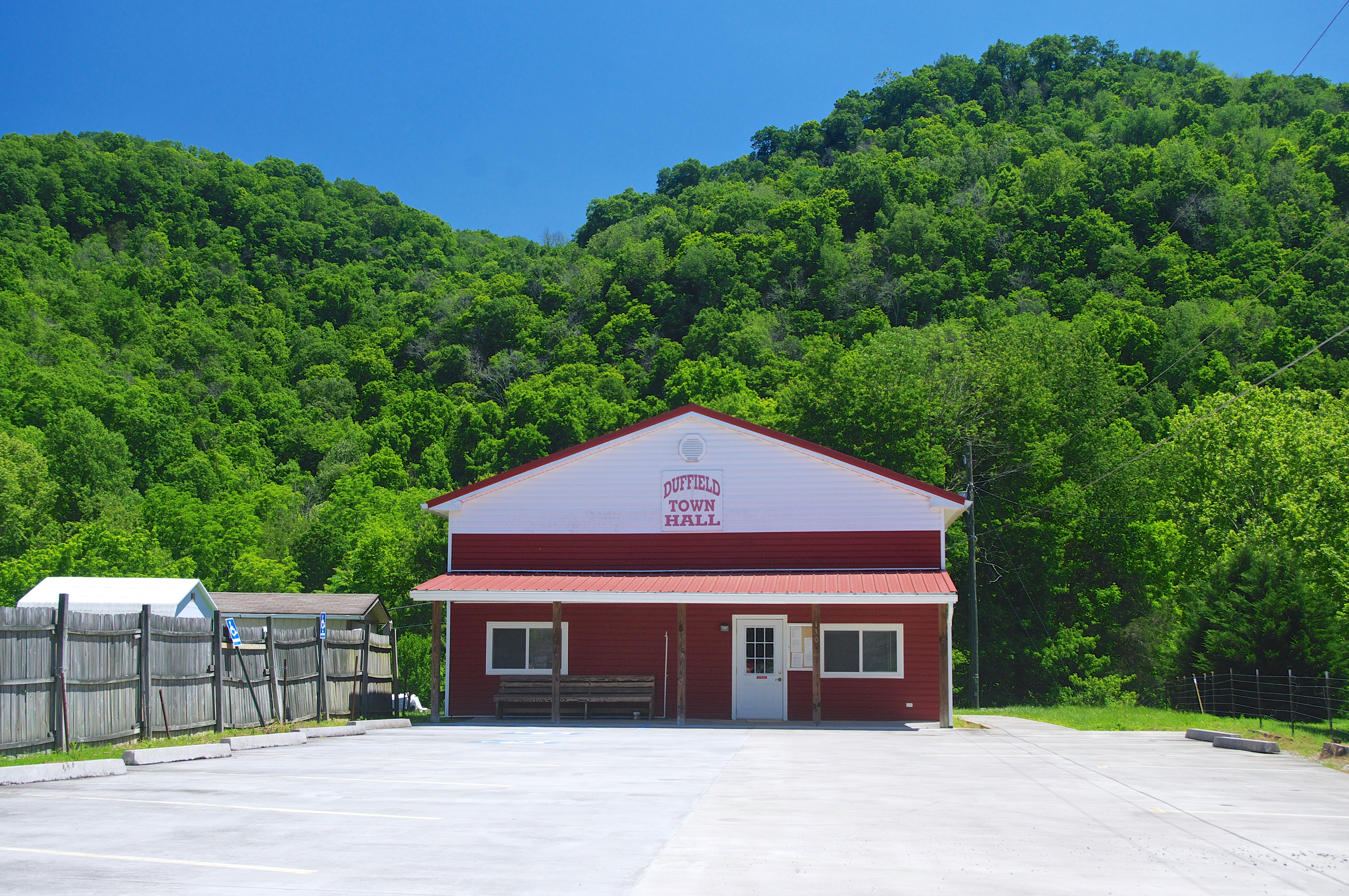
Duffield Town Hall

Located between Duffield and Pattonsville, on U.S. Route 421, is the gravesite of Ross Carter, a paratrooper from World War II, who wrote Those Devils in Baggy Pants, a story about the 82nd Airborne during World War II. There are many Civil War-era homes in the Duffield area. The Daniel Boone Cabin was located in Duffield, but was moved to Kingsport in 1979.

The town is situated at the southern edge of the Jefferson National Forest and approximately two miles west of Natural Tunnel State Park. Natural Tunnel, called the "Eighth Wonder of the World" by William Jennings Bryan, has been attracting sightseers for more than 100 years.
