= USS McConnell =

Cannon-class destroyer escort

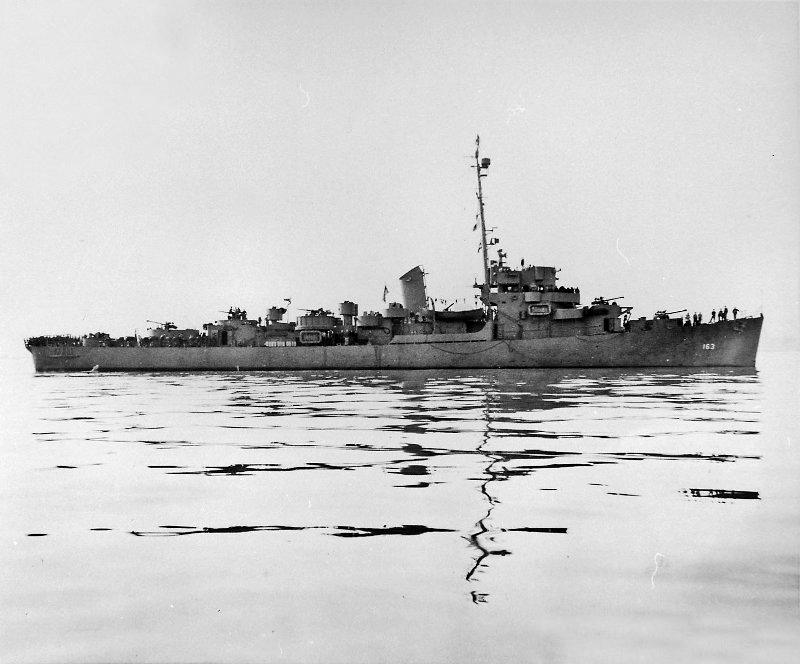

History

United States
- Name: USS McConnell
- Namesake: Riley Franklin McConnell
- Builder: Federal Shipbuilding and Drydock Company, Newark, New Jersey
- Laid down: 19 October 1942
- Launched: 28 March 1943
- Commissioned: 28 May 1943
- Decommissioned: 29 June 1946
- Stricken: 1 October 1972
- Honors and awards: 3 battle stars (World War II)
- Fate: Sold for scrapping 21 March 1974

General characteristics
- Class & type: Cannon-class destroyer escort
- Displacement: 1,240 long tons (1,260 t) standard; 1,620 long tons (1,646 t) full
- Length: 306 ft (93 m) o/a; 300 ft (91 m) w/l
- Beam: 36 ft 10 in (11.23 m)
- Draft: 11 ft 8 in (3.56 m)
- Propulsion: 4 × GM Mod. 16-278A diesel engines with electric drive, 6,000 shp (4,474 kW), 2 screws
- Speed: 21 knots (39 km/h; 24 mph)
- Range: 10,800 nmi (20,000 km) at 12 kn (22 km/h; 14 mph)
- Complement: 15 officers and 201 enlisted
- Armament: 3 single × Mk.22 3"/50 caliber guns; 8 × 20 mm Mk.4 AA guns; 3 × 21 inch (533 mm) torpedo tubes; 1 × Hedgehog Mk.10 anti-submarine mortar (144 rounds); 8 × Mk.6 depth charge projectors; 2 × Mk.9 depth charge tracks

USS McConnell (DE-163) was a Cannon-class destroyer escort built for the United States Navy during World War II. She served in the Pacific Ocean and provided escort service against submarine and air attack for Navy vessels and convoys. She was awarded three battle stars.

== Namesake ==
Riley Franklin McConnell was born on 22 July 1884 at Gate City, Virginia. He graduated from the United States Naval Academy on 7 June 1909. For over three decades he carried out a wide variety of assignments. During World War I he served as navigator onboard USS Arkansas; later, he had duty as executive officer on the USS Ohio, USS Relief and USS Chicago; and in 1935 and 1936 he commanded USS Milwaukee. Following instruction at the Naval War College, he served on the staff of Commander in Chief, Asiatic Fleet, between 1925 and 1927. Commissioned captain on 1 September 1934, he returned to the Asiatic Fleet and served as Chief of Staff from 30 October 1936 to 25 July 1939. For distinguished service during this period, he received the Navy Cross. On 22 August 1939 McConnell assumed command of the Naval Training Station at San Diego, California, where he died while on active duty on 12 July 1940.

== Construction and commissioning ==
She was laid down by Federal Shipbuilding and Drydock Company, Newark, New Jersey, on 19 October 1942; launched on 28 March 1943; sponsored by Mrs. Grace Otteson McConnell; and commissioned at Brooklyn Navy Yard on 28 May 1943.

== World War II Pacific Theatre operations ==
After shakedown off Bermuda and training out of Norfolk, Virginia, McConnell sailed for the west coast 24 August, transited the Panama Canal the 31st, and reached San Francisco, California, on 10 September. Departing ten days later, she escorted ships to Pearl Harbor, Samoa, New Caledonia, and the New Hebrides and on 29 October arrived off Guadalcanal, Solomons, for patrol and escort duty.

Assigned to Escort Division 11, McConnell carried out extensive escort and ASW patrol operations in the South Pacific during the next seven months. Operating primarily out of New Caledonia and the New Hebrides, she escorted ships to American bases throughout the Solomons from Tulagi to Bougainville, as well as to the Fijis and Samoa. She departed the Solomons on 12 June 1944 in the screen of a convoy bound for the Marshalls and reached Eniwetok on 18 June.

== Supporting the recapture of Guam ==
McConnell patrolled between Eniwetok and Kwajalein until on 23 July when she sailed to escort ships carrying men and supplies for the recapture of Guam. She closed the western coast of Guam on 28 July, protected off-loading ships from enemy submarines, thence returned to Eniwetok in convoy on 29 July to 2 August. Departing the Marshalls on 20 August, she arrived Manus, Admiralties, the 26th; and, on 1 September, sailed with ships of the Logistics Support Group (TG 30.8). During much of the month she escorted oilers and supply ships as they replenished ships of the Fast Carrier Task Force, then carrying out devastating air strikes in the Palaus and the Philippines. In October she screened logistics ships as they provided at sea support for the hard hitting carriers pounding enemy positions from Formosa to Mindanao.

McConnell departed Eniwetok on 5 November, touched at Pearl Harbor the 12th, and reached San Francisco on 22 November. Following overhaul at Mare Island, California, on 16 January she departed for Hawaii to perform, patrol and escort duties until sailing for the Marshalls on 11 March. Between 24 March and 4 May she made three round trips to the Marianas and back while escorting convoys to Guam and Saipan.

== "Mopping Up" operations ==
McConnell steamed to Majuro on 6 May and during the closing months of World War II patrolled off the bypassed islands in the Marshalls. She conducted periodic shore bombardments, and she provided air-sea rescue service during air strikes against enemy-controlled islands. She rescued eight Marshallese natives off Jaluit on 13 May. On the 14th, and again on the 21st, she captured two surrendering Japanese soldiers from Enejet and the island of Bokku. Following the Japanese capitulation on 15 August, she carried American occupation troops to Mille Atoll on 28 August; at Jaluit, Japanese came aboard to surrender their forces on the island on 5 September.

== Post-War decommissioning ==
McConnell departed the Marshalls on 16 September and steamed via the west coast to New York City, arriving on 20 October. She sailed to Green Cove Springs, Florida, 13 to 16 November, decommissioned there on 29 June 1946, and entered the Atlantic Reserve Fleet. She remained with the Atlantic Inactive Fleet at Norfolk, Virginia until she was sold for scrapping on 21 March 1974.

== Awards ==
McConnell received three battle stars for World War II service.
