= Bush Mill =

- U.S. National Register of Historic Places
- Virginia Landmarks Register
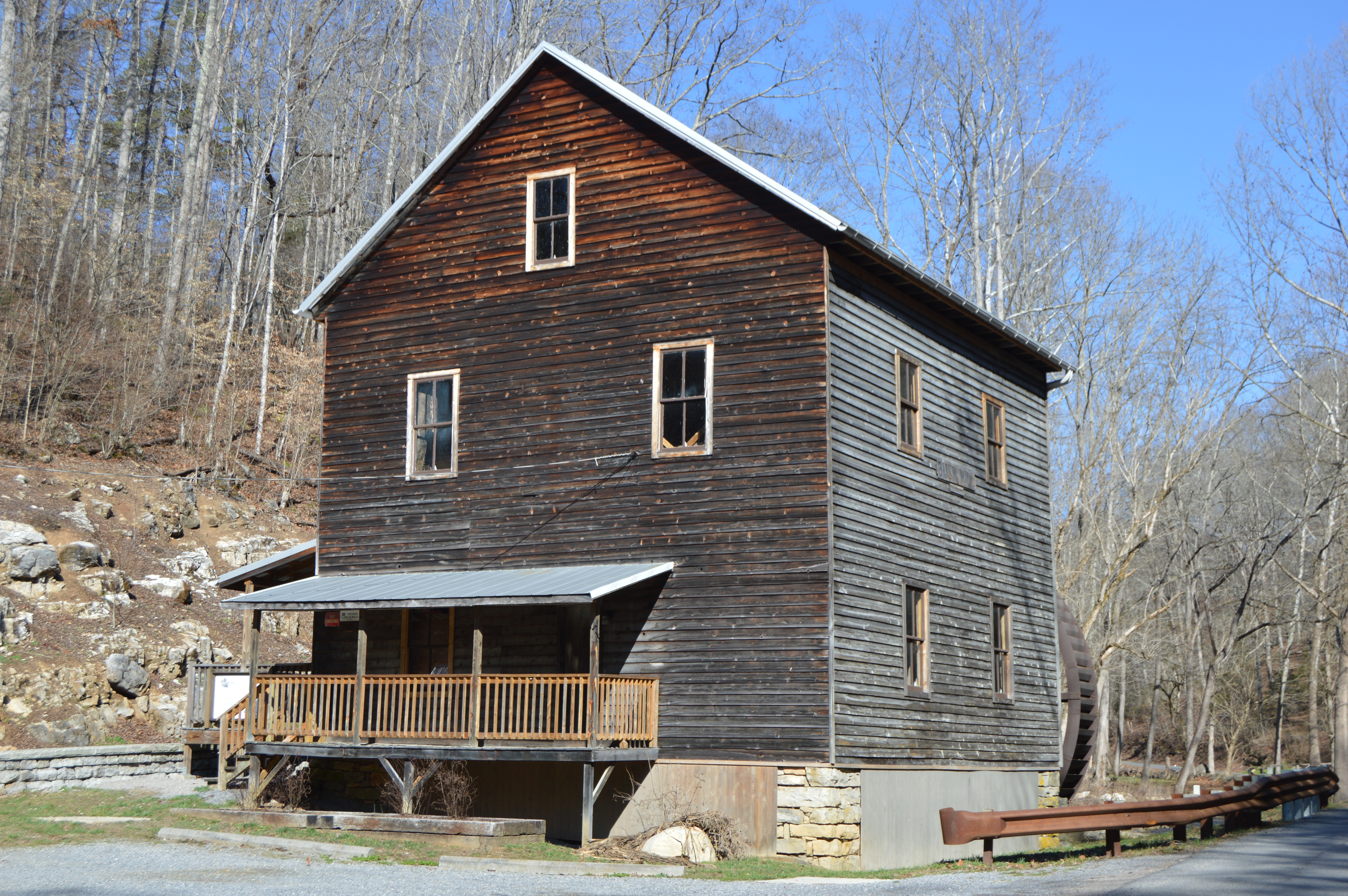
- View from southwest; water wheel is slightly visible behind the building to the right

- Location within Virginia
- Location: 1162 Bush Mill Rd., near Nickelsville, Virginia
- Coordinates: 36°45′21″N 82°19′14.5″W
- Area: 1 acre (0.40 ha)
- Built: 1896
- Built by: Valentine Bush
- NRHP reference No.: 08000831
- VLR No.: 084-5151

Significant dates
- Added to NRHP: September 5, 2008
- Designated VLR: June 19, 2008

Bush Mill, also known as Bond Roller Mill, is a historic grist mill located near Nickelsville, Scott County, Virginia. It was built in 1896, and is a three-story, log and timber frame building on a limestone foundation. It has a front gable roof sheathed in metal. It measures 39 feet, 9 inches by 30 feet, 4 inches. The mill has a 24-foot (diameter) and 4 feet wide overshot steel waterwheel added in the 1920s, which is intact and remains functional. The building is maintained by the Nickelsville Ruritan Club.

It was listed on the National Register of Historic Places in 2008.
