= Georges Fork, Virginia =

Unincorporated community in Virginia, United States

Coordinates: 37°08′56″N 82°29′11″W

Georges Fork is an unincorporated community in Dickenson County, Virginia, United States.

== History ==
A post office was established at Georges Fork in 1907, and remained in operation until it was discontinued in 1950. An early settler named George who lived at the mouth of the creek caused the name to be selected.
