= Lagrange, Virginia =

Unincorporated community in Virginia, United States

- Unincorporated community
- Location within Virginia Location within the United States
- Coordinates: 38°26′29″N 77°51′11″W
- Country: United States
- State: Virginia
- County: Culpeper
- Elevation: 308 ft (94 m)
- Time zone: UTC-5 (Eastern (EST))
  - Summer (DST): UTC-4 (EDT)
- Area code: 540
- GNIS feature ID: 1495021

Lagrange is an unincorporated community in Culpeper County, Virginia, United States.
