= Nickelsville, Virginia =

Nickelsville
- Town
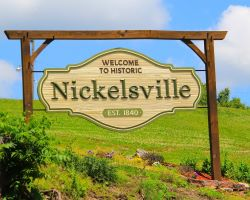

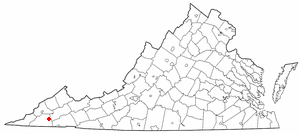
- Location of Nickelsville, Virginia
- Coordinates: 36°45′7″N 82°25′1″W
- Country: United States
- State: Virginia
- County: Scott

Area
  - Total: 0.48 sq mi (1.24 km^{2})
  - Land: 0.48 sq mi (1.24 km^{2})
  - Water: 0 sq mi (0.00 km^{2})
- Elevation: 1,916 ft (584 m)

Population (2020)
  - Total: 378
  - Density: 789/sq mi (304.7/km^{2})
- Time zone: UTC−5 (Eastern (EST))
  - Summer (DST): UTC−4 (EDT)
- ZIP code: 24271
- Area code: 276
- FIPS code: 51-56304
- GNIS feature ID: 1493348

Nickelsville is a town in Scott County, Virginia, United States. The population was 378 at the 2020 census. It is part of the Metropolitan Statistical Area, which is a component of the Johnson City-Kingsport-Bristol, TN-VA Combined Statistical Area – commonly known as the "Tri-Cities" region.

== History ==
Bush Mill and the Kilgore Fort House are listed on the National Register of Historic Places.

== Geography ==
Nickelsville is located at 36°45′07″N 82°25′01″W (36.751927, −82.416951).

According to the United States Census Bureau, the town has a total area of 0.5 square miles (1.3 km^{2}), all of it land.

== Demographics ==
Historical population
Census	Pop.	Note	%±
1920	214		—
1930	263		22.9%
1940	256		−2.7%
1950	268		4.7%
1960	291		8.6%
1970	338		16.2%
1980	464		37.3%
1990	411		−11.4%
2000	448		9.0%
2010	383		−14.5%
2020	378		−1.3%
U.S. Decennial Census

As of the census of 2000, there were 448 people, 184 households, and 117 families living in the town. The population density was 932.8 people per square mile (360.4/km^{2}). There were 210 housing units at an average density of 437.2 per square mile (168.9/km^{2}). The racial makeup of the town was 99.78% White, and 0.22% from two or more races. Hispanic or Latino of any race were 0.67% of the population.

There were 184 households, out of which 28.3% had children under the age of 18 living with them, 52.2% were married couples living together, 9.8% had a female householder with no husband present, and 35.9% were non-families. 34.2% of all households were made up of individuals, and 20.1% had someone living alone who was 65 years of age or older. The average household size was 2.33 and the average family size was 2.97.

In the town, the population was spread out, with 21.9% under the age of 18, 9.8% from 18 to 24, 21.7% from 25 to 44, 26.3% from 45 to 64, and 20.3% who were 65 years of age or older. The median age was 43 years. For every 100 females, there were 77.8 males. For every 100 females aged 18 and over, there were 78.6 males.

The median income for a household in the town was $20,250, and the median income for a family was $31,750. Males had a median income of $21,528 versus $25,625 for females. The per capita income for the town was $11,871. About 15.2% of families and 26.7% of the population were below the poverty line, including 36.0% of those under age 18 and 27.9% of those age 65 or over.

== Notable people ==
- Maybelle Carter, country music artist, mother of June Carter Cash.
- Ollan Cassell, gold medalist at the 1964 Summer Olympics.
