= Clinchport, Virginia =

Clinchport
- Town
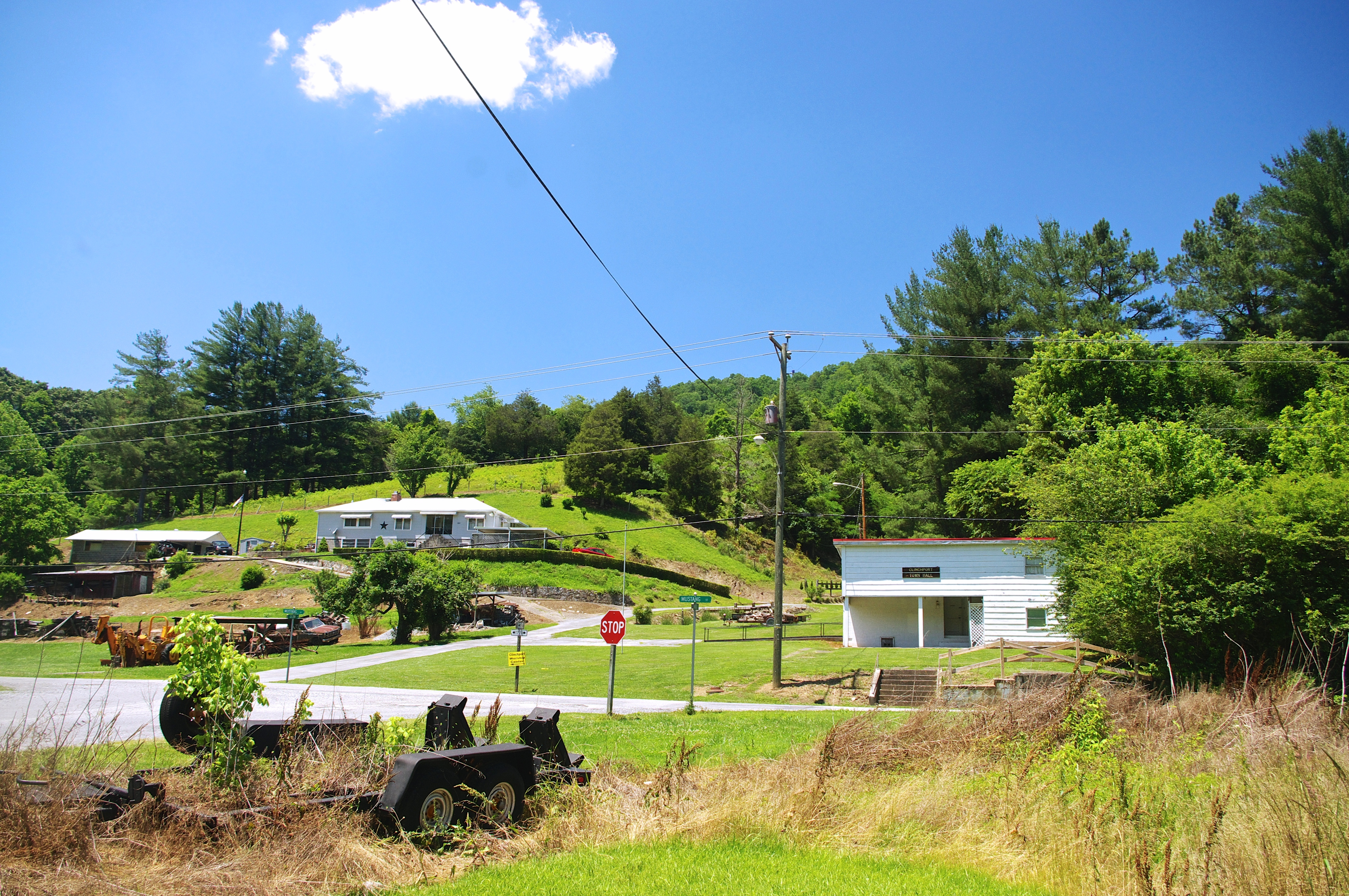
- Clinchport, with town hall on the right

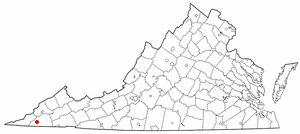
- Location of Clinchport, Virginia
- Coordinates: 36°40′27″N 82°44′50″W
- Country: United States
- State: Virginia
- County: Scott

Area
  - Total: 0.69 sq mi (1.80 km^{2})
  - Land: 0.67 sq mi (1.73 km^{2})
  - Water: 0.031 sq mi (0.08 km^{2})
- Elevation: 1,227 ft (374 m)

Population (2020)
  - Total: 64
  - Density: 96/sq mi (37/km^{2})
- Time zone: UTC-5 (Eastern (EST))
  - Summer (DST): UTC-4 (EDT)
- ZIP code: 24244
- Area code: 276
- FIPS code: 51-17536
- GNIS feature ID: 1493548

Clinchport is a town in Scott County, Virginia, United States. The population was 64 at the 2020 census. Clinchport is the least-populated municipality in Virginia. It is part of the Kingsport-Bristol-Bristol, TN-VA Metropolitan Statistical Area, which is a component of the Johnson City-Kingsport-Bristol, TN-VA Combined Statistical Area – commonly known as the "Tri-Cities" region.

Clinchport was named from its location on the Clinch River.

Clinchport owes its small population to a severe 100-year flood event in 1977. After the natural disaster, local authorities incentivized residents to relocate to nearby communities with support from the Tennessee Valley Authority . Today, few structures remain in the town's floodplain.

== Geography ==
Clinchport is located at 36°40′27″N 82°44′50″W (36.674171, -82.747138).

According to the United States Census Bureau, the town has a total area of 0.7 square miles (1.8 km^{2}), of which 0.04 square miles (0.10 km^{2}), or 4.23%, is water.

== Demographics ==
Historical population
Census	Pop.	Note	%±
1900	183		—
1910	252		37.7%
1920	226		−10.3%
1930	338		49.6%
1940	346		2.4%
1950	359		3.8%
1960	302		−15.9%
1970	286		−5.3%
1980	89		−68.9%
1990	67		−24.7%
2000	77		14.9%
2010	70		−9.1%
2020	64		−8.6%
2025 (est.)	62	▼	−3.1%
U.S. Decennial Census 2020

At the 2000 census, there were 77 people, 31 households and 19 families living in the town. The population density was 113.6 per square mile (43.7/km^{2}). There were 38 housing units at an average density of 56.1 per square mile (21.6/km^{2}). The racial makeup of the town was 98.70% White, and Hispanic or Latino of any race were 1.30%.

Of the 31 households 35.5% had children under the age of 18 living with them, 45.2% were married couples living together, 16.1% had a female householder with no husband present, and 38.7% were non-families. 32.3% of households were one person and 6.5% were one person aged 65 or older. The average household size was 2.48 and the average family size was 3.16.

The age distribution was 26.0% under the age of 18, 6.5% from 18 to 24, 33.8% from 25 to 44, 20.8% from 45 to 64, and 13.0% 65 or older. The median age was 34 years. For every 100 females there were 120.0 males. For every 100 females age 18 and over, there were 128.0 males.

The median household income for a household in the town was $31,875, and the median family income was $36,250. Males had a median income of $21,500 versus $11,250 for females. The per capita income for the town was $10,485. About 8.7% of families and 9.2% of the population were below the poverty line, including 9.1% of those under 18 and none of those over 64.

According to the 2020 U.S. Census, Clinchport had a population of 64 residents, making it one of the smallest incorporated towns in Virginia by population. The town’s small size has persisted into the early 2020s, with 2023 estimates showing a slight decline to around 62–61 residents and a median age of approximately 29.6 years. The estimated median household income was about $43,333.

According to the U.S. Census Bureau’s 2024 estimates, Clinchport is estimated to have 62 residents. This figure comes from the Census Bureau’s Population Estimates Program (PEP), which provides updated annual population estimates between the official census counts.
