= Hiltons, Virginia =

Unincorporated community in Virginia, US

Hiltons is an unincorporated community and census-designated place in Scott County, Virginia, United States. As of the 2020 census, Hiltons had a population of 334. It is part of the Kingsport-Bristol, TN-VA Metropolitan Statistical Area, which is a component of the Johnson City-Kingsport-Bristol, TN-VA Combined Statistical Area – commonly known as the "Tri-Cities" region.

== History ==
The Fulkerson-Hilton House was listed on the National Register of Historic Places in 2002.

== Geography ==
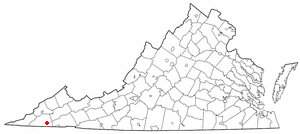
Location of Hiltons, Virginia

Hiltons is located at 36°39′18″N 82°28′04″W (36.65485, -82.46777). The community is situated along US highway 421 (Virginia route 58) in the Poor Valley region of Virginia, bounded on the north by Clinch Mountain and the south by Pine Ridge. The area is most noted as being a waypoint on the route to Maces Spring, home to the Carter Family Fold, which lies three miles to the east.

== Demographics ==
Hiltons first appeared as a census designated place in the 2020 United States census.
