= Scott County, Virginia =

County in Virginia, United States

- County
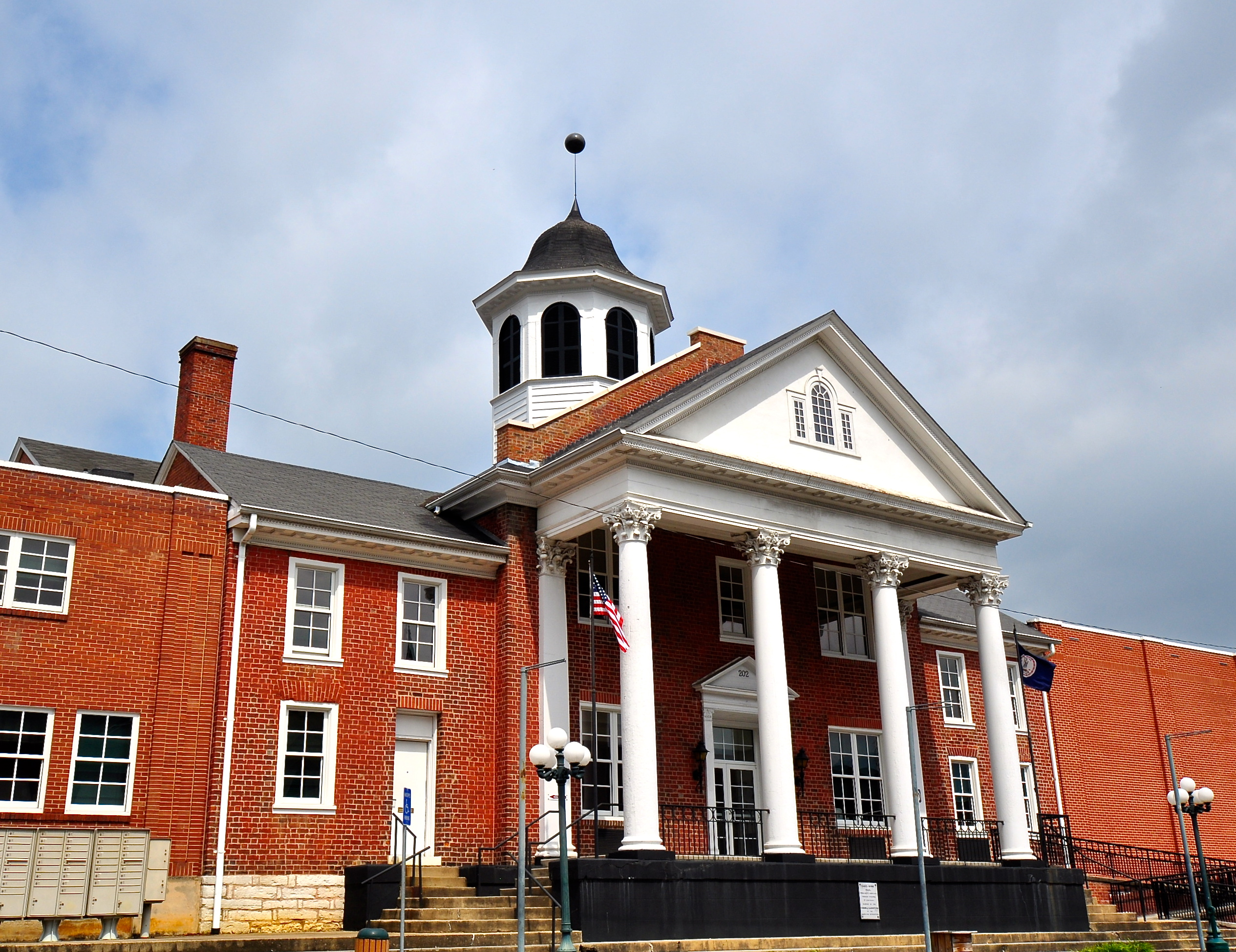
- Scott County Courthouse in 2013

- Flag Seal

- Location within the U.S. state of Virginia
- Coordinates: 36°43′N 82°36′W
- Country: United States
- State: Virginia
- Founded: November 24, 1814
- Named for: Winfield Scott
- Seat: Gate City
- Largest town: Gate City

Area
  - Total: 539 sq mi (1,400 km^{2})
  - Land: 536 sq mi (1,390 km^{2})
  - Water: 3.1 sq mi (8.0 km^{2}) 0.6%

Population (2020)
  - Total: 21,576
  - Estimate (2025): 21,200 ▼
  - Density: 40.3/sq mi (15.5/km^{2})
- Time zone: UTC−5 (Eastern)
  - Summer (DST): UTC−4 (EDT)
- Congressional district: 9th
- Website: www.scottcountyva.com

Scott County is a county located in the far southwestern part of the U.S. state of Virginia, on the border with Tennessee. As of the 2020 census, the population was 21,576. Its county seat is Gate City. Scott County was formed by an act of the General Assembly on November 24, 1814, from parts of Washington, Lee, and Russell counties and was named for Virginia-born General Winfield Scott. Scott County is part of the Kingsport–Bristol–Bristol, TN-VA Metropolitan Statistical Area, which is a component of the Johnson City–Kingsport–Bristol, TN-VA Combined Statistical Area, commonly known as the "Tri-Cities" region.

== History ==
The area was occupied for thousands of years by indigenous Native Americans. Early Anglo-European settlers found evidence of a former native village at the mouth of Stoney Creek on the Clinch River. Bands of Cherokee lived in the area.

In 1769 Thomas McCulloch was the first white settler in what was later organized as the county. Daniel Boone commanded several forts located here in 1774 during Dunmore's War, and several more were built in successive years.

Increased settlement of colonial Americans encroached on Cherokee territory. A group known by the settlers as the Chickamauga Cherokee (but they were not a separate tribe), was led by Bob Benge. They had armed confrontations with settlers during the Cherokee–American wars. Benge was killed in 1794, years after the United States gained independence in the American Revolution.

By the time houses were built in the 1790s, the largely Scots-Irish population had increased. They were mostly yeomen farmers who had moved into the backcountry where land was more available. They were served by the Wilderness Road which brought traders to the area. After Scott County was formed in 1814, the first court took place in 1815.

The first public schools were not established here until 1870, years after the American Civil War and during the Reconstruction era in Virginia and other former Confederate states. The wealthy planters of Virginia paid for their own children's education but nothing for the rest of the white people.

== Geography ==
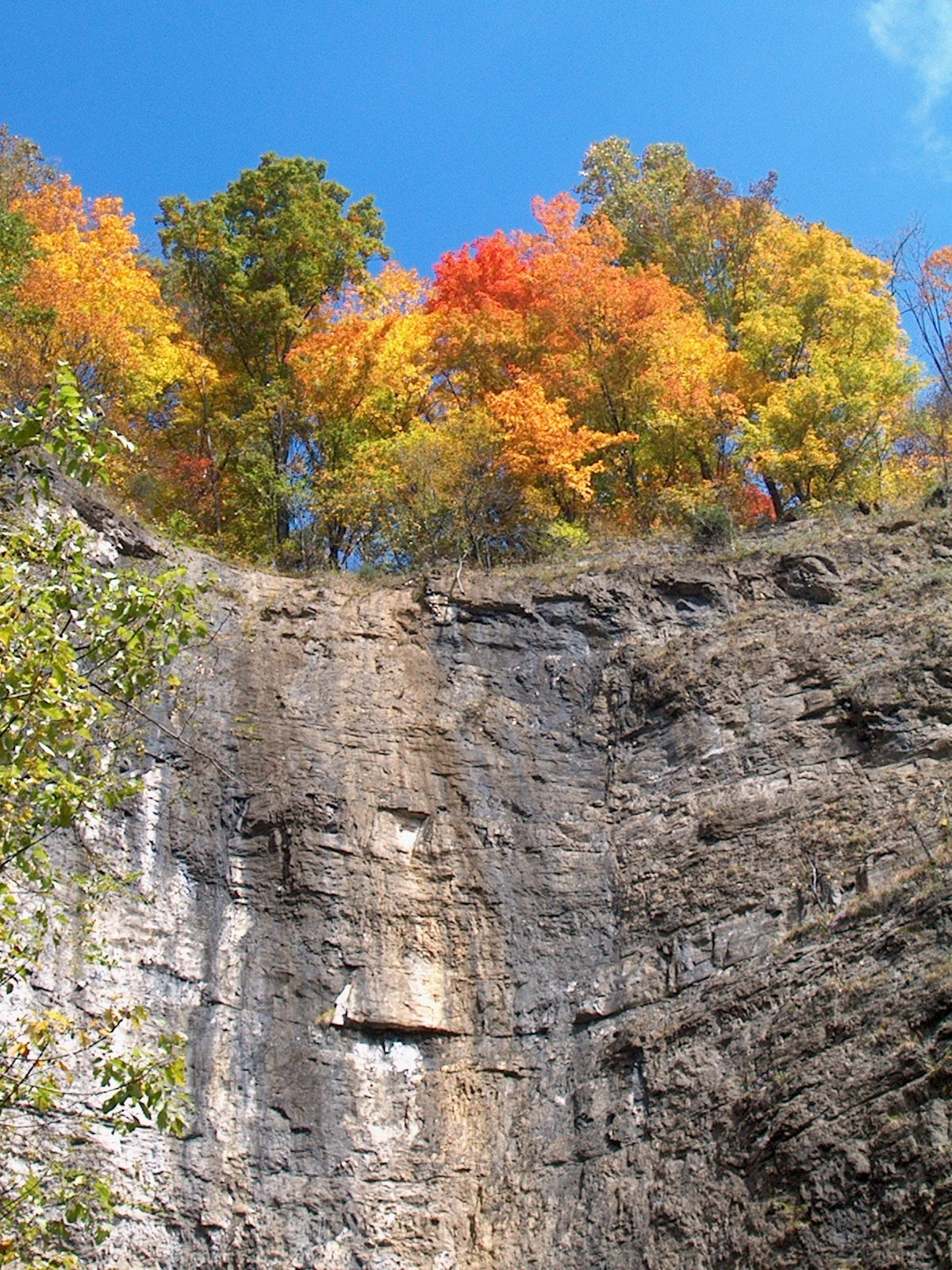
Fall foliage at Natural Tunnel State Park in Scott County

According to the U.S. Census Bureau, the county has a total area of 539 square miles (1,400 km^{2}), of which 536 square miles (1,390 km^{2}) is land and 3.1 square miles (8.0 km^{2}) (0.6%) is water. Scott County is one of the 423 counties served by the Appalachian Regional Commission, and it is identified as part of "Greater Appalachia" by Colin Woodard in his book American Nations: A History of the Eleven Rival Regional Cultures of North America.

=== Adjacent counties ===
- Wise County - north
- Russell County - northeast
- Washington County - east
- Sullivan County, Tennessee - south
- Hawkins County, Tennessee - south
- Hancock County, Tennessee - southwest
- Lee County - west

=== National protected area ===
- Jefferson National Forest (part)

=== Major highways ===
- US 23
- US 58
- US 421
- SR 65
- SR 71
- SR 72

== Demographics ==
Historical population
Census	Pop.	Note	%±
1820	4,263		—
1830	5,724		34.3%
1840	7,303		27.6%
1850	9,829		34.6%
1860	12,072		22.8%
1870	13,036		8.0%
1880	17,233		32.2%
1890	21,694		25.9%
1900	22,694		4.6%
1910	23,814		4.9%
1920	24,776		4.0%
1930	24,181		−2.4%
1940	26,989		11.6%
1950	27,640		2.4%
1960	25,813		−6.6%
1970	24,376		−5.6%
1980	25,068		2.8%
1990	23,204		−7.4%
2000	23,403		0.9%
2010	23,177		−1.0%
2020	21,576		−6.9%
2025 (est.)	21,200	▼	−1.7%
U.S. Decennial Census; 1790-1960 1900-1990; 1990-2000 2010 2020

=== Racial and ethnic composition ===
Scott County, Virginia – Racial and ethnic composition Note: the US Census treats Hispanic/Latino as an ethnic category. This table excludes Latinos from the racial categories and assigns them to a separate category. Hispanics/Latinos may be of any race.
Race / Ethnicity (NH = Non-Hispanic)	Pop 1980	Pop 1990	Pop 2000	Pop 2010	Pop 2020	% 1980	% 1990	% 2000	% 2010	% 2020
White alone (NH)	24,766	22,962	22,992	22,585	20,528	98.80%	98.96%	98.24%	97.45%	95.14%
Black or African American alone (NH)	157	143	137	135	134	0.63%	0.62%	0.59%	0.58%	0.62%
Native American or Alaska Native alone (NH)	14	17	27	48	26	0.06%	0.07%	0.12%	0.21%	0.12%
Asian alone (NH)	5	4	16	35	20	0.02%	0.02%	0.07%	0.15%	0.09%
Native Hawaiian or Pacific Islander alone (NH)	x	x	4	0	2	x	x	0.02%	0.00%	0.01%
Other race alone (NH)	4	4	12	3	28	0.02%	0.02%	0.05%	0.01%	0.13%
Mixed race or Multiracial (NH)	x	x	116	137	583	x	x	0.50%	0.59%	2.70%
Hispanic or Latino (any race)	122	74	99	234	255	0.49%	0.32%	0.42%	1.01%	1.18%
Total	25,068	23,204	23,403	23,177	21,576	100.00%	100.00%	100.00%	100.00%	100.00%

=== 2020 census ===
As of the 2020 census, the county had a population of 21,576. The median age was 47.8 years. 18.2% of residents were under the age of 18 and 24.6% of residents were 65 years of age or older. For every 100 females there were 100.2 males, and for every 100 females age 18 and over there were 98.7 males age 18 and over.

The racial makeup of the county was 95.6% White, 0.6% Black or African American, 0.1% American Indian and Alaska Native, 0.1% Asian, 0.0% Native Hawaiian and Pacific Islander, 0.3% from some other race, and 3.2% from two or more races. Hispanic or Latino residents of any race comprised 1.2% of the population.

1.7% of residents lived in urban areas, while 98.3% lived in rural areas.

There were 9,254 households in the county, of which 23.4% had children under the age of 18 living with them and 26.0% had a female householder with no spouse or partner present. About 31.9% of all households were made up of individuals and 16.1% had someone living alone who was 65 years of age or older.

There were 11,765 housing units, of which 21.3% were vacant. Among occupied housing units, 76.6% were owner-occupied and 23.4% were renter-occupied. The homeowner vacancy rate was 1.8% and the rental vacancy rate was 9.3%.

=== 2010 Census ===
As of the 2010 United States census, there were 23,177 people living in the county. 97.9% were White, 0.6% Black or African American, 0.2% Native American, 0.2% Asian, 0.1% Pacific Islander, 0.4% of some other race and 0.7 of two or more races. 1.0% were Hispanic or Latino (of any race).

As of the census of 2000, there were 23,403 people, 9,795 households, and 7,023 families living in the county. The population density was 44 inhabitants per square mile (17/km^{2}). There were 11,355 housing units at an average density of 21 units per square mile (8.1 units/km^{2}). The racial makeup of the county was 98.51% White, 0.59% Black or African American, 0.14% Native American, 0.07% Asian, 0.02% Pacific Islander, 0.15% from other races, and 0.52% from two or more races. 0.42% of the population were Hispanic or Latino of any race.

There were 9,795 households, out of which 27.60% had children under the age of 18 living with them, 59.40% were married couples living together, 9.00% had a female householder with no husband present, and 28.30% were non-families. 26.10% of all households were made up of individuals, and 13.10% had someone living alone who was 65 years of age or older. The average household size was 2.35 and the average family size was 2.82.

In the county, 20.60% of the population was under the age of 18, 7.50% was from 18 to 24, 27.30% from 25 to 44, 26.80% from 45 to 64, and 17.80% was 65 years of age or older. The median age was 41 years. For every 100 females, there were 93.30 males. For every 100 females age 18 and over, there were 90.70 males.

The median income for a household in the county was $27,339, and the median income for a family was $33,163. Males had a median income of $28,328 versus $20,553 for females. The per capita income for the county was $15,073. About 13.00% of families and 16.80% of the population were below the poverty line, including 20.10% of those under age 18 and 20.50% of those age 65 or over.

== Education ==
=== Public secondary schools ===
- Gate City High School, Gate City
- Rye Cove High School, Rye Cove
- Twin Springs High School, Nickelsville

=== Public intermediate schools ===
- Gate City Middle School, Gate City
- Rye Cove Intermediate School, Rye Cove

=== Public primary schools ===
- Dungannon Elementary School, Dungannon
- Duffield Primary School, Duffield
- Fort Blackmore Center, Fort Blackmore
- Hilton Elementary School, Hiltons
- Nickelsville Elementary School, Nickelsville
- Shoemaker Elementary School, Gate City
- Weber City Elementary School, Weber City
- Yuma Elementary School, Yuma

=== Technical schools ===
- Scott County Career and Technical Center, Gate City

=== Private schools ===
- Gate City Christian School (United Pentecostal affiliation), Gate City

=== Former schools ===
- Clinchport Elementary School, Clinchport (Destroyed by flood, 1977)
- Cleveland High School, Yuma (Closed, 1956) (Demolished)
- Dungannon High School, Dungannon (Closed, 1968)
- Fairview School, Fairview (Closed, 1990)
- Hilton High School, Hiltons (Closed, 1956) (Demolished)
- Midway School, Midway (Closed, 1968) (Demolished)
- Manville School, Manville (Closed, 1972)
- Nickelsville High School, Nickelsville (Closed, 1968) (Demolished)
- Old Rye Cove School, Rye Cove (Destroyed by tornado, 1929)
- Old Shoemaker Elementary School, Gate City (Destroyed by fire, 1957)
- Prospect Elementary School, Gate City (Closed, 1965) (Demolished)

== Communities ==
=== Towns ===
- Clinchport
- Duffield
- Dungannon
- Gate City
- Nickelsville
- Weber City

=== Census-designated place ===
- Hiltons

=== Unincorporated communities ===
- Antioch
- Copper Creek
- Daniel Boone
- Fairview
- Fort Blackmore
- Fulkerson
- Glenita
- Hill Station
- Kermit
- Ketrontown
- Mabe
- Maces Spring
- Manville
- Midway
- Nottingham
- Pattonsville
- Rye Cove
- Slabtown
- Slant
- Snowflake
- Speers Ferry
- Sunbright
- Wadlow Gap
- Wood
- Yuma

== Notable people ==
- June Carter Cash
- The Carter Family
- Claude M. Hilton
- Jerry Kilgore
- Riley Franklin McConnell (USS McConnell)
- Mac McClung
- Terry Kilgore

== Politics ==
Scott County has been a Republican stronghold for decades. It last voted for a Democrat in 1976, and from 2016 onward it gave Republican Donald Trump over 80% of the vote in every election.

United States presidential election results for Scott County, Virginia
Year	Republican		Democratic		Third party(ies)	
Year	No.	%	No.	%	No.	%
1912	557	18.80%	1,311	44.26%	1,094	36.93%
1916	1,743	56.65%	1,319	42.87%	15	0.49%
1920	2,449	59.34%	1,671	40.49%	7	0.17%
1924	2,666	54.28%	2,177	44.32%	69	1.40%
1928	2,916	55.32%	2,355	44.68%	0	0.00%
1932	1,673	43.56%	2,137	55.64%	31	0.81%
1936	2,046	49.09%	2,122	50.91%	0	0.00%
1940	2,982	54.58%	2,474	45.28%	8	0.15%
1944	3,089	51.63%	2,888	48.27%	6	0.10%
1948	3,520	56.12%	2,676	42.67%	76	1.21%
1952	4,703	61.13%	2,990	38.87%	0	0.00%
1956	5,116	58.44%	3,595	41.07%	43	0.49%
1960	4,936	56.45%	3,789	43.33%	19	0.22%
1964	4,533	48.90%	4,720	50.92%	16	0.17%
1968	5,345	53.54%	3,144	31.49%	1,495	14.97%
1972	5,125	66.18%	2,474	31.95%	145	1.87%
1976	4,313	45.43%	4,496	47.36%	685	7.22%
1980	4,744	50.54%	4,314	45.96%	329	3.50%
1984	5,804	59.10%	3,904	39.75%	113	1.15%
1988	4,986	56.76%	3,616	41.16%	183	2.08%
1992	4,515	46.59%	3,979	41.06%	1,196	12.34%
1996	4,086	47.66%	3,449	40.23%	1,038	12.11%
2000	5,535	59.29%	3,552	38.05%	248	2.66%
2004	6,479	65.00%	3,324	33.35%	164	1.65%
2008	6,980	70.68%	2,725	27.59%	170	1.72%
2012	7,439	74.45%	2,395	23.97%	158	1.58%
2016	8,247	81.65%	1,581	15.65%	272	2.69%
2020	9,063	83.38%	1,692	15.57%	114	1.05%
2024	9,392	84.79%	1,607	14.51%	78	0.70%

== See also ==
- National Register of Historic Places listings in Scott County, Virginia
