= Dungannon, Virginia =

Dungannon
- Town
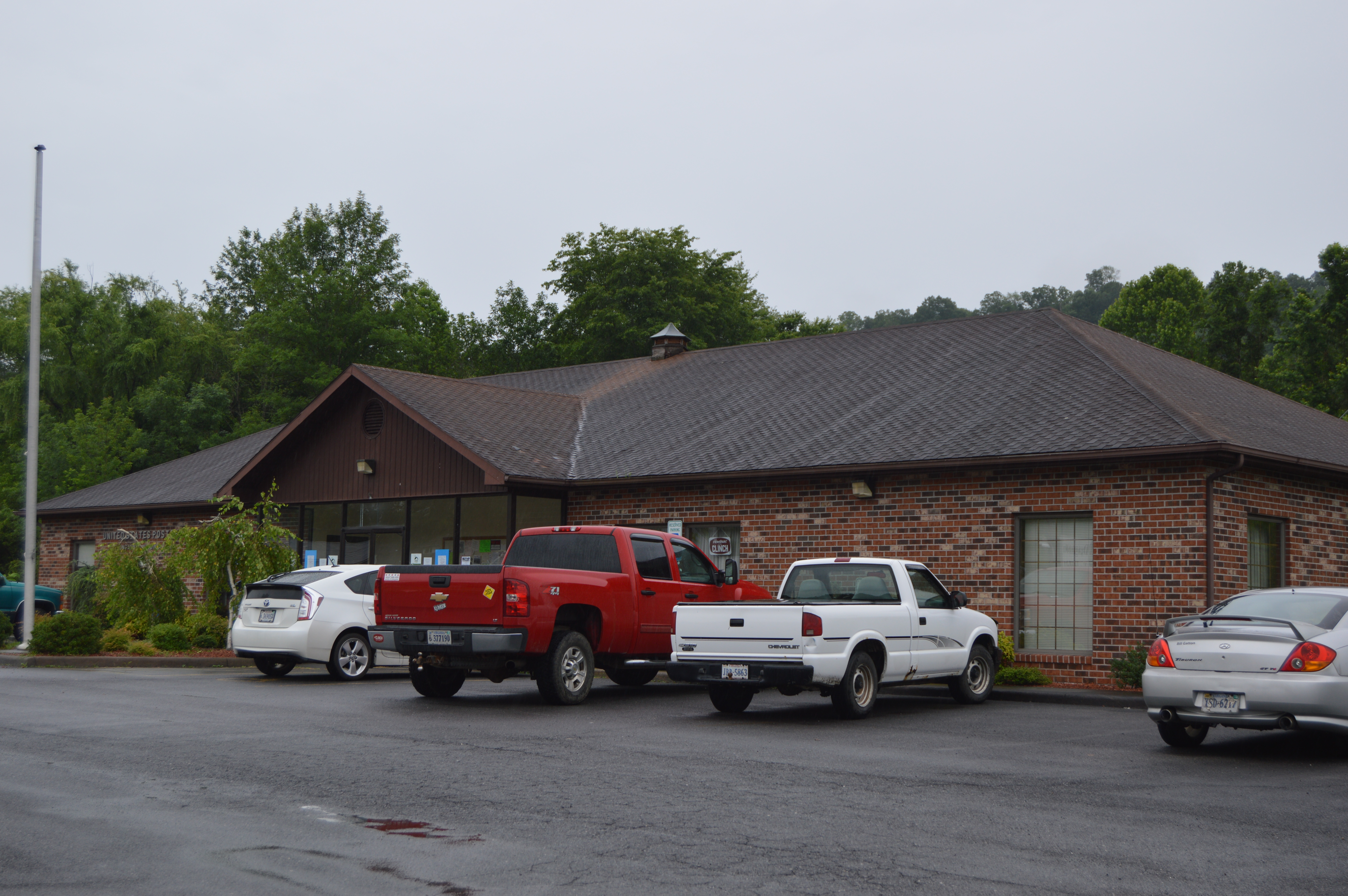
- Town hall and post office in 2017

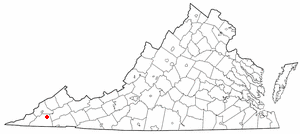
- Location of Dungannon, Virginia
- Coordinates: 36°49′40″N 82°28′8″W
- Country: United States
- State: Virginia
- County: Scott

Area
  - Total: 0.36 sq mi (0.92 km^{2})
  - Land: 0.36 sq mi (0.92 km^{2})
  - Water: 0 sq mi (0.00 km^{2})
- Elevation: 1,339 ft (408 m)

Population (2020)
  - Total: 257
  - Density: 720/sq mi (278/km^{2})
- Time zone: UTC-5 (Eastern (EST))
  - Summer (DST): UTC-4 (EDT)
- ZIP code: 24245
- Area code: 276
- FIPS code: 51-23952
- GNIS feature ID: 1483171
- Website: Official website

Dungannon is a town in Scott County, Virginia that sits in the heart of the Clinch River. The population was 257 at the 2020 census. It was named after the town of Dungannon in County Tyrone, Northern Ireland.

Dungannon is part of the Kingsport-Bristol-Bristol, TN-VA Metropolitan Statistical Area, which is a component of the Johnson City-Kingsport-Bristol, TN-VA Combined Statistical Area – commonly known as the "Tri-Cities" region.

== History ==
The Flanary Archeological Site was listed on the National Register of Historic Places in 1983.

== Geography ==
Dungannon is located at 36°49′40″N 82°28′8″W (36.827894, -82.468828).

According to the United States Census Bureau, the town has a total area of 0.4 square miles (1.0 km^{2}), all land.

== Demographics ==
Historical population
Census	Pop.	Note	%±
1920	255		—
1930	282		10.6%
1940	333		18.1%
1950	431		29.4%
1960	444		3.0%
1970	282		−36.5%
1980	339		20.2%
1990	250		−26.3%
2000	317		26.8%
2010	332		4.7%
2020	257		−22.6%
2025 (est.)	254	▼	−1.2%
U.S. Decennial Census

At the 2000 census there were 317 people, 132 households, and 90 families living in the town. The population density was 869.5 people per square mile (340.0/km^{2}). There were 149 housing units at an average density of 408.7 per square mile (159.8/km^{2}). The racial makeup of the town is 100.00% White. Of the 132 households 33.3% had children under the age of 18 living with them, 56.8% were married couples living together, 10.6% had a female householder with no husband present, and 31.1% were non-families. 28.0% of households were one person and 17.4% were one person aged 65 or older. The average household size was 2.40 and the average family size was 2.96.

The age distribution was 24.0% under the age of 18, 9.8% from 18 to 24, 27.1% from 25 to 44, 25.2% from 45 to 64, and 13.9% 65 or older. The median age was 39 years. For every 100 females there were 89.8 males. For every 100 females age 18 and over, there were 89.8 males.

The median household income was $21,406 and the median family income was $27,292. Males had a median income of $26,042 versus $16,389 for females. The per capita income for the town was $12,200. About 21.3% of families and 25.1% of the population were below the line of poverty, including 37.3% of those under age 18 and 7.3% of those age 65 or over.

== Notable person ==
- Dave Hillman, former Major League Baseball player for eight seasons, including for the Chicago Cubs and New York Mets
