= Killgore =

Killgore may refer to:

== People ==
- Andrew Killgore, American diplomat
- Sarah Killgore Wertman, American lawyer
- Edith Killgore Kirkpatrick, American music educator

== Places ==
- Joseph Killgore House, Delaware, United States
- Killgore Hall, Delaware, United States

== Fiction ==
- Killgore, an antagonist from My Life as a Teenage Robot

== See also ==
- Kilgore (disambiguation)
