= Kilgore (disambiguation) =

Kilgore is a city in Texas.

Kilgore may also refer to:

== Places ==
- Kilgore, Idaho
- Kilgore, Nebraska
- Kilgore, Ohio

== Fictional characters ==
- Kilgor, a barbarian king in the computer game Heroes of Might and Magic III: Armageddon's Blade
- Kilgore, a Killer Instinct character
- Kilgore Trout, a recurring character in the novels of Kurt Vonnegut
- Lt. Colonel Bill Kilgore, a character in the film Apocalypse Now
- Eli and Hastings Kilgore, brothers from the Ugly Hill webcomic
- Kade Kilgore, Marvel Comics character
- Tacitus Kilgore, a pseudonym used by Arthur Morgan in Red Dead Redemption 2
- Teddybear Kilgore (AKA Kilgour), a character in the John Irving novel A Prayer for Owen Meany
- Kilg%re, a DC Comics supervillain

== People ==
=== Politics ===
- Constantine B. Kilgore (1835–1897), U.S. Representative from Texas
- Daniel Kilgore (politician) (1794–1851), U.S. Representative from Ohio
- David Kilgore (1804–1879), U.S. Representative from Indiana, grandfather of Bernard Kilgore
- Hailey Kilgore (born 1999), American actress and singer
- Harley M. Kilgore (1893–1956), U.S. Senator from West Virginia
- Jerry W. Kilgore (born 1961), former Virginia Attorney General
- Larry Kilgore (born 1965), Texas conservative Christian activist and political candidate
- Moses Kilgore (1817–1890), Wisconsin state legislator
- Terry Kilgore (born 1961), Virginia state delegate, twin brother of Jerry W. Kilgore

=== Other people ===
- Al Kilgore (1927–1983), cartoonist
- Bernard Kilgore (1908–1967), editor of The Wall Street Journal
- Caroline Burnham Kilgore (1838–1909), American lawyer and suffragist
- Chad Kilgore (born 1989), American football player
- Kenneth Kilgore (1947–2011), American musician
- Merl Kilgore (active beginning 1951), founder of Zion's Order, Inc., a Latter Day Saint sect
- Merle Kilgore (1934–2005), country music singer/songwriter
- Theola Kilgore (1925–2005), American singer
- Tom Kilgore (active 1984–2012), CEO of the Tennessee Valley Authority

== Other uses ==
- Kilgore (band), a heavy metal band from Providence, Rhode Island
- Kilgore College
  - Kilgore College Rangerettes
- Kilgore Film Festival
- Kilgore News Herald

== See also ==
- Killgore (disambiguation)
- Kilgour
