= Henrik J. Krebs =

American businessman (1847–1929)

Henrik Johannes Krebs
- Born: June 27, 1847; Lolland, Denmark
- Died: October 7, 1929 (aged 82)
- Other names: Henry J. Krebs
- Occupation: Businessman
- Spouse: Ebba Victoria Kruse

Henrik Johannes Krebs (June 27, 1847 – October 7, 1929), sometimes called Henry J. Krebs, was an American immigrant from Denmark who started the Krebs Pigments and Chemical Company to manufacture the pigment lithopone.

== Biography ==
Krebs was born on June 27, 1847, in Lolland, Denmark, to Hans Peter Tholstrup Krebs and Johanne Louise (Wichfled) Krebs. He emigrated to the United States in 1879.

He soon became the superintendent of the Delaware Sugar Beet Factory, associated with Alfred D. Wagner. Krebs later joined Pusey & Jones Co. and built the first ice plant in Wilmington, Delaware.

In 1886, Krebs, Wagner, and William G. Pennypacker founded the Delaware Chemical Company to produce anhydrous ammonia, which later became the National Ammonia Company.

Around 1902, he formed the Krebs Pigments and Chemical Company. In 1908, he built a new plant in Newport, Delaware.

Krebs retired from Krebs Pigments and Chemical Company in 1921, when his son, August Sonin Krebs, took over as president.

In 1926, Krebs supplied $150,000 to Newport, Delaware, for the construction of a school to be named after him, on the occasion of his 50th wedding anniversary The school opened in September 1927.

For services to the Royal Polytechnic College in Copenhagen, the King of Denmark appointed Krebs Knight of the Order of the Dannebrog.

Krebs died on October 7, 1929, after a long illness. After his death, his company was purchased by DuPont.

== Personal ==
On June 24, 1876, he married Ebba Victoria Kruse. At his death, he was survived by his wife and two children, August Sonnin, and Johanna Louise.

== See also ==
- List of people from Delaware
