= Orby L. Cantrell =

American politician

Orby Cantrell

Member of the Virginia House of Delegates
- In office January 9, 1952 – April 29, 1982 Serving with T. Monroe Bates (1952–1956); James Camblos (1956–1964); Robert S. Orr (1964–1966); Edgar Bacon (1966–1972); Ford C. Quillen (1972–1982)
- Preceded by: James Camblos
- Succeeded by: Jim Robinson
- Constituency: 73rd district (19??–1964); 41st district (1964–1972); 1st district (1972–1982)

Personal details
- Born: Orby Lee Cantrell; November 10, 1906 Pound, Virginia, U.S.
- Died: April 29, 1982 (aged 75) Wise, Virginia, U.S.
- Party: Democratic
- Spouses: Janie Mullins; Magoline Dingus Pennington
- Education: Radford College

Orby Lee Cantrell (November 10, 1906 – April 29, 1982) was an American Democratic Party politician who served as a member of the Virginia House of Delegates from 1952 to his death in 1982. At the time of his passing, he was the longest-tenured member of the Virginia General Assembly.

== Education ==
He attended Pound High School and Radford College.

== Memberships/Affiliations ==
- Masons
- Lions
- Wise County Chamber of Commerce (former president).
- Peoples Bank of Pound (executive vice president, former president).
- Breaks Interstate Park Association Clinch Valley College Advisory Committee (former president).
- Kentucky Colonels St. Mary's Hospital Advisory Committee.
- Appalachian Regional Hospital Advisory Committee (former member).
