= Joseph Tatnall House =

Historic house in Delaware, United States

- U.S. National Register of Historic Places
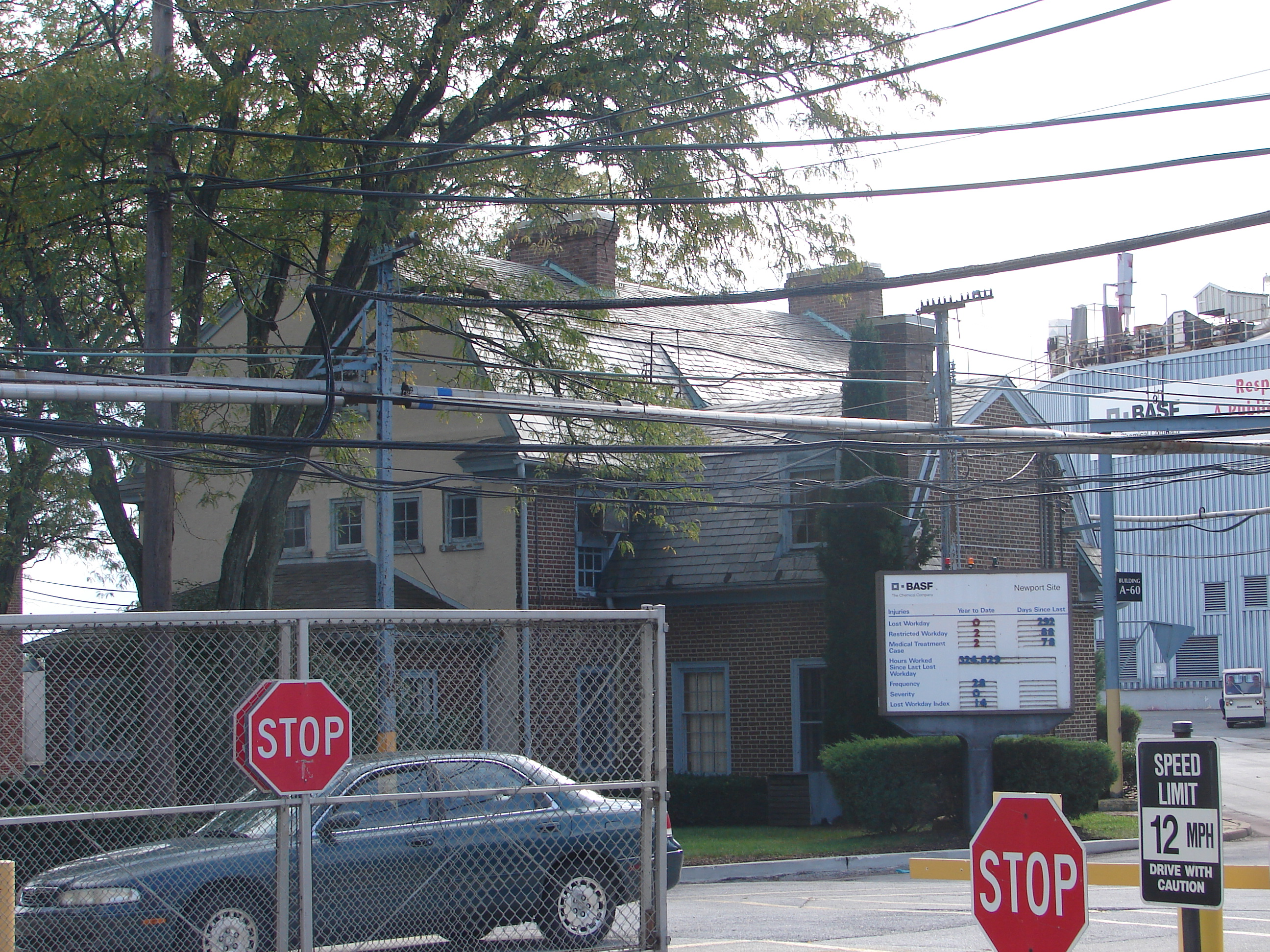
- Tatnall House, October 2011

- Location within Delaware Location within the United States
- Location: 205 S. James St., Newport, Delaware
- Coordinates: 39.710894°N 75.609511°W
- Area: less than one acre
- Built: c. 1750, c. 1915
- Architectural style: Georgian
- MPS: Newport Delaware MPS
- NRHP reference No.: 93000631
- Added to NRHP: July 14, 1993

Joseph Tatnall House, also known as the "Oliver Evans House," is a historic home located at Newport, New Castle County, Delaware. The house is alternatively named after Newport's favorite son Oliver Evans (1755-1819), although he had no apparent historical association with it.

It is a 2 1/2-story, five-bay gambrel-roofed brick building in the Georgian style. The oldest section dates to about 1750, and are the two easternmost bays. The other three bays were added later in the 18th century. A 1 1/2-story, gambrel-roofed ell and small one-story wings were added about 1915. The 1915 renovations were by the Krebs Pigments and Chemical Company, which carried out an extensive expansion of its facilities and used the house for administrative offices. The plant was acquired by the E. I. Du Pont de Nemours & Co. in 1929. In 1984, DuPont sold the plant to Ciba-Geigy; the plant was spun off to Ciba Specialty Chemicals in 1997 and it, and the house, were owned by the BASF branch, BASF Colors & Effects, until the branch was sold to Sun Chemical in 2021. Today, Sun Chemical Colors & Effects is the owner of the house.

The house was added to the National Register of Historic Places in 1993.
