= Country Cabin =

- U.S. National Register of Historic Places
- Virginia Landmarks Register
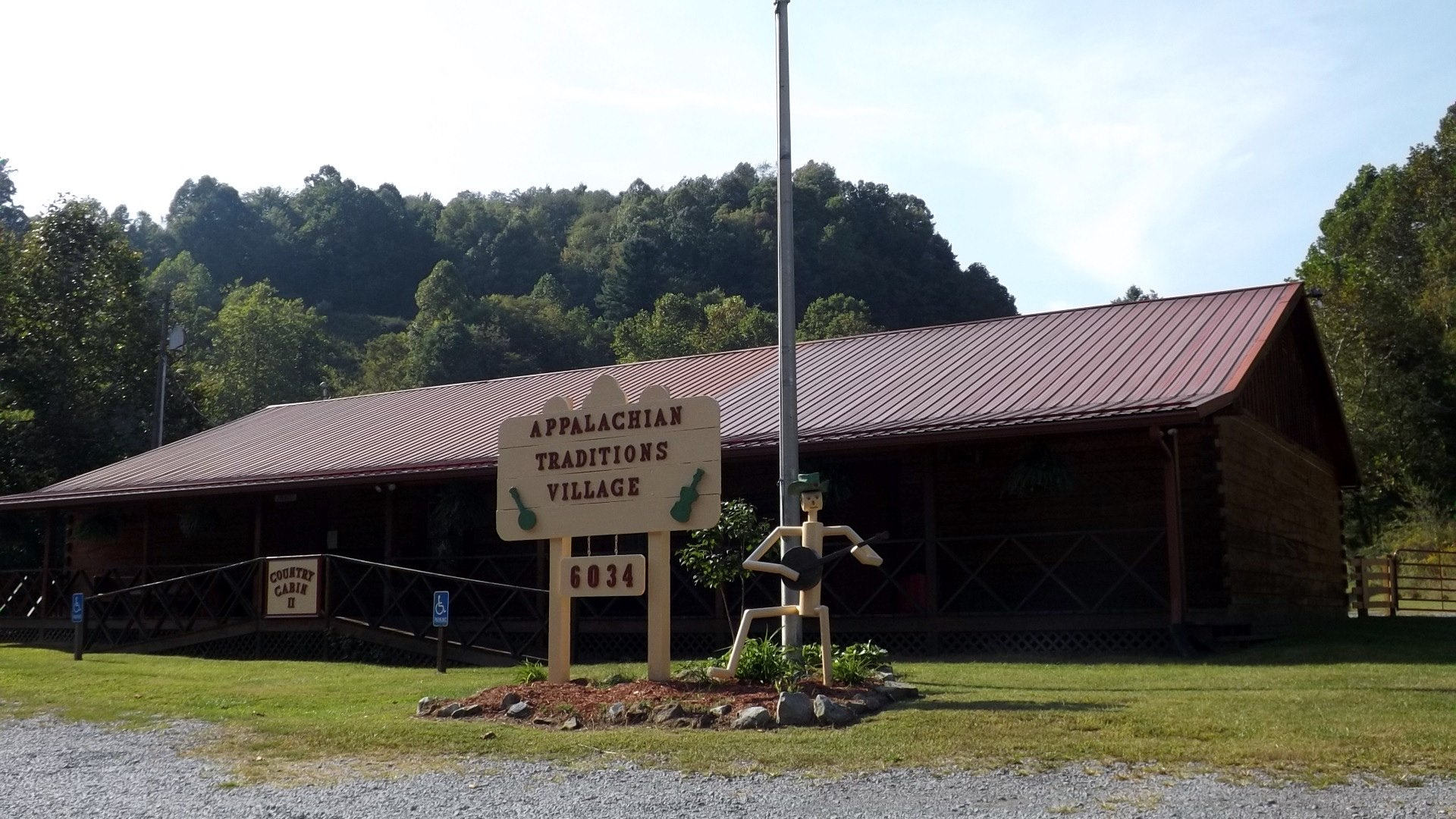
- Country Cabin, September 2013

- Location within Virginia Location within the United States
- Location: Jct. of US 23 and VA 790, near Norton, Virginia
- Coordinates: 36°55′35″N 82°40′24″W
- Area: 1.2 acres (0.49 ha)
- Built: 1937
- Architectural style: Log cabin
- NRHP reference No.: 92001395
- VLR No.: 097-0059

Significant dates
- Added to NRHP: October 27, 1992
- Designated VLR: April 22, 1992

Country Cabin is a historic log cabin and community center located near Norton, Wise County, Virginia. It was built in 1937, and is a one-story, chestnut log building measuring 20 feet by 40 feet. The Country Cabin has been continually used to promote traditional Appalachian heritage through music, dance, and cultural programs.

It was listed on the National Register of Historic Places in 1992.
