= Virginia's 45th House of Delegates district =

Virginia legislative district

District map from the 2023 election

Virginia's 45th House of Delegates district elects one of 100 seats in the Virginia House of Delegates, the lower house of the state's bicameral legislature. District 45 includes the city of Norton, the counties of Lee, Scott, and Wise, and part of Dickenson County. The seat has been represented by Republican Terry Kilgore since 1994.

== Geography ==
District 45 consists of far southwest Virginia, and borders the states of Kentucky and Tennessee. It is in Virginia's 9th Congressional District.

== Electoral history ==
Democrat Mark Levine won a five-way Democratic Primary in June 2015 and was elected without opposition that fall. He was re-elected without opposition in 2017, receiving the highest vote total of any 2017 candidate for the Virginia House of Delegates.

Levine ran for reelection unchallenged in the November 2019 general election and was elected to a third term. Levine lost renomination in 2021.

Following the state's redistricting in 2021, Virginia's 1st House of Delegates district moved to northeast Virginia and the 45th was moved to the southwest Virginia. The geographic area has been represented by Republican Terry Kilgore since 1994, who ran unopposed for the 45th district in 2023.

=== Election results ===
Virginia's 45th House of Delegates district Democratic Primary, 2015
Party	Candidate	Votes	%	±%
Democratic	Mark H. Levine	2,679	28	
Democratic	Craig T. Fifer	2,343	24	
Democratic	Julie N. Jakopic	2,243	23	
Democratic	Clarence K. Tong	1,668	17	
Democratic	Laurence M. Altenburg, II	698	7	
Turnout		9,631		

Virginia's 45th House of Delegates district General Election, 2015
Party	Candidate	Votes	%	±%
Democratic	Mark H. Levine	16,055	95%	
Write-ins		832	5%	
Turnout		16,887		

Virginia's 45th House of Delegates district General Election, 2017
Party	Candidate	Votes	%	±%
Democratic	Mark H. Levine (inc.)	31,417	95%	
Write-ins		1,599	5%	
Turnout		33,016		

Virginia's 45th House of Delegates district General Election, 2019
Party	Candidate	Votes	%	±%
Democratic	Mark H. Levine (inc.)	19,824	92%	
Write-ins		1,852	8%	
Turnout		21,676		

Virginia's 45th House of Delegates district General Election, 2021
Party	Candidate	Votes	%	±%
Democratic	Elizabeth Bennett-Parker	31,310	73%	
Republican	JD Maddox	11,069	26%	
Turnout		42,496		
