= Galloway-Walker House =

Historic house in Delaware, United States

- U.S. National Register of Historic Places
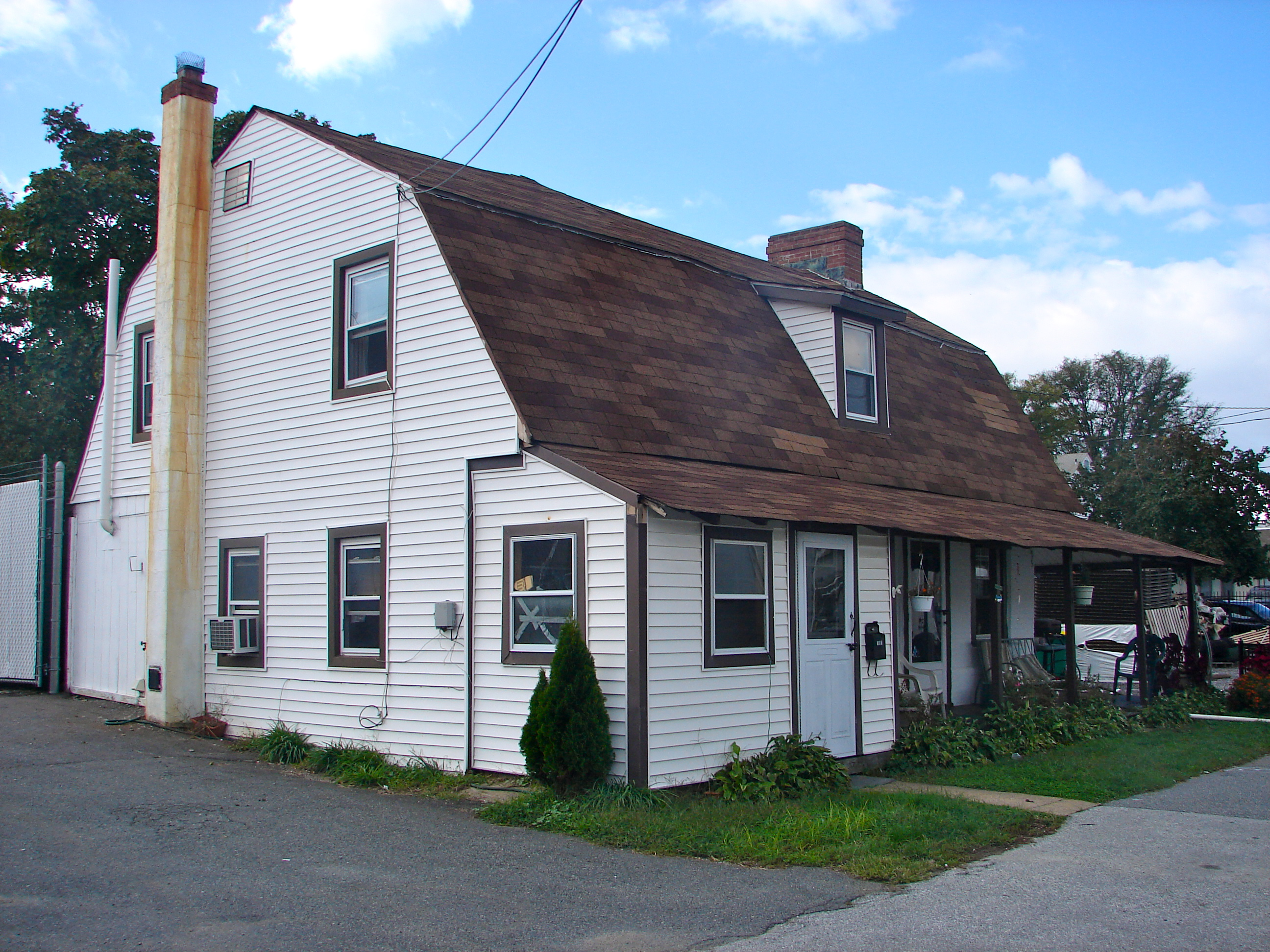
- Galloway-Walker House, October 2011

- Location within Delaware Location within the United States
- Location: 107 John St., Christiana Hundred, Newport, Delaware
- Coordinates: 39.712316°N 75.610569°W
- Area: less than one acre
- Architectural style: Vernacular
- MPS: Newport Delaware MPS
- NRHP reference No.: 93000633
- Added to NRHP: July 14, 1993

Galloway-Walker House is a historic home located at Newport, New Castle County, Delaware. The original section was built 18th century, and is a 1 1/2-story, three-bay, brick dwelling with a gambrel roof. The house was expanded with a frame addition to add a fourth bay in the late-19th century. It is a hall-parlor plan dwelling.

It was added to the National Register of Historic Places in 1993.
