= Collison House (Newport, Delaware) =

Historic house in Delaware, United States

- U.S. National Register of Historic Places
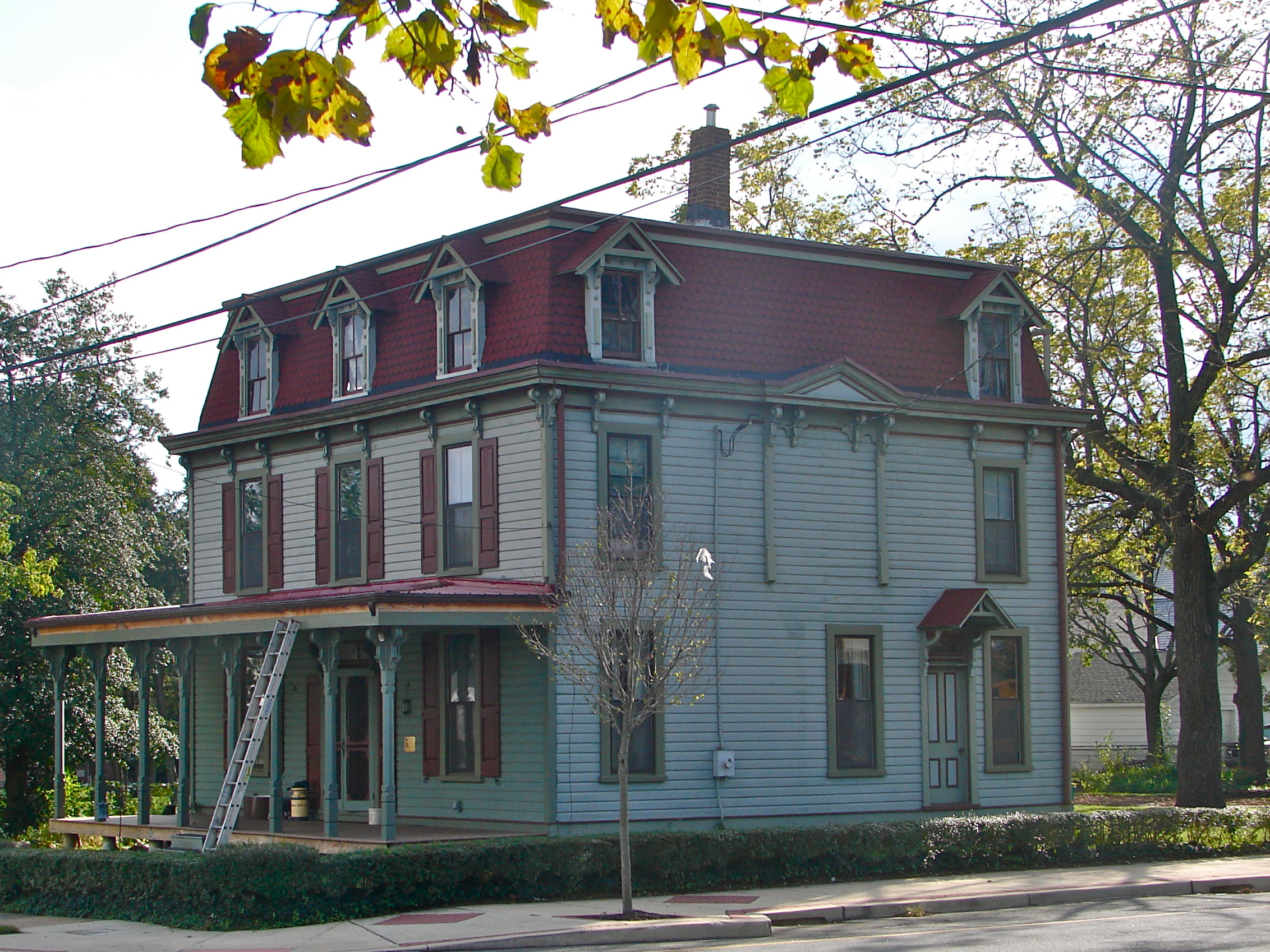
- Collison House, October 2011

- Location within Delaware Location within the United States
- Location: 21 N. Walnut St., Newport, Delaware
- Coordinates: 39.714734°N 75.607437°W
- Area: less than one acre
- Built: 1885
- Architectural style: Second Empire
- MPS: Newport Delaware MPS
- NRHP reference No.: 93000635
- Added to NRHP: July 14, 1993

Collison House is a historic home located at Newport, New Castle County, Delaware. It was built about 1885, and is a 2 1/2-story, three bay by three bay, square frame dwelling with a mansard roof in the Second Empire style. The mansard roof has broad gable dormers and the house features a two-story, projecting bay. It has a full-width, hipped roof porch on the front facade.

It was added to the National Register of Historic Places in 1993.
