= Newport National Bank =

- U.S. National Register of Historic Places
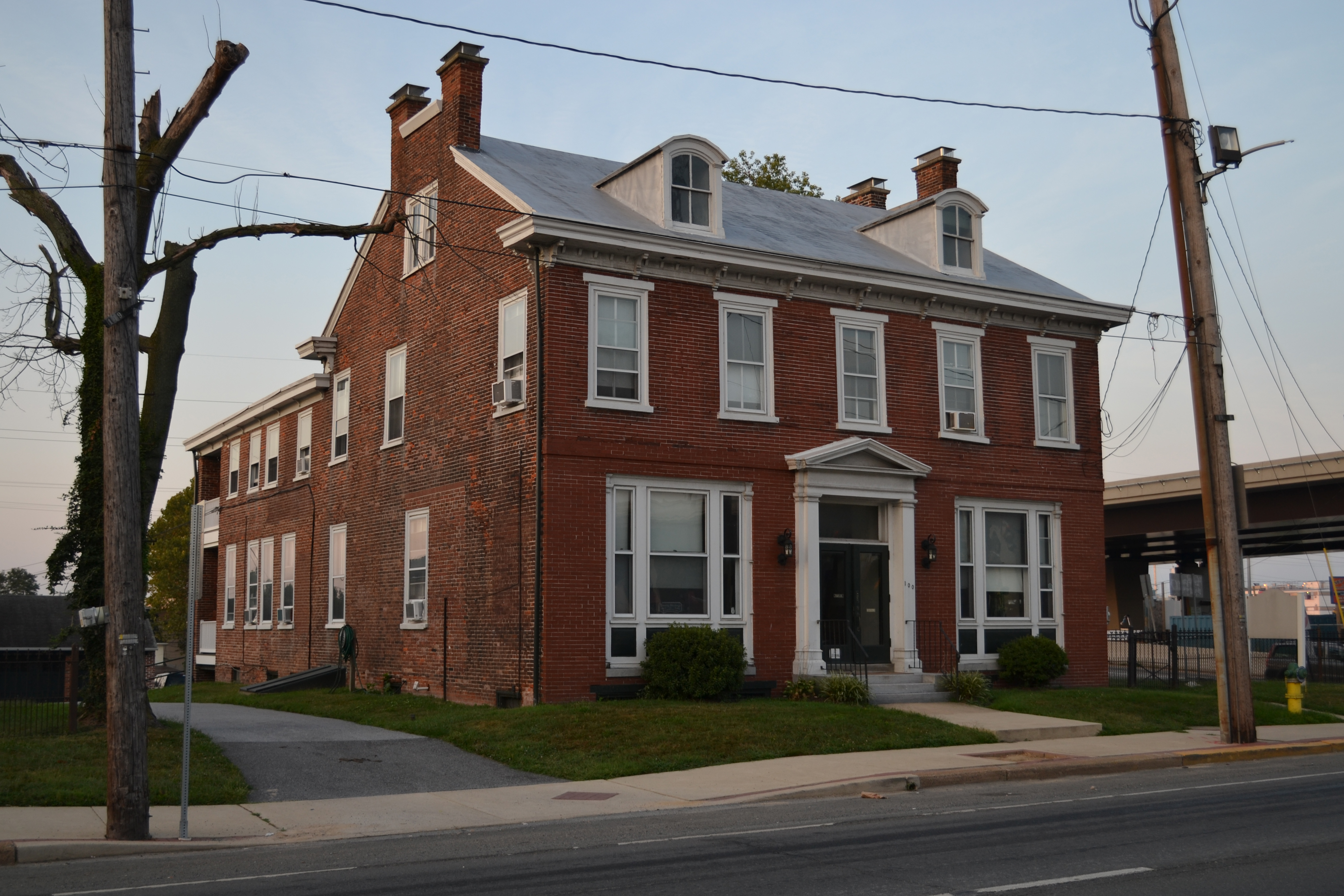
- Newport National Bank, August 2015

- Location within Delaware Location within the United States
- Location: 100 E. Market St., Newport, Delaware
- Coordinates: 39°42′49″N 75°36′29″W
- Area: less than one acre
- Built: 1864, 1927
- Architectural style: Colonial Revival
- MPS: Newport Delaware MPS
- NRHP reference No.: 93000634
- Added to NRHP: July 14, 1993

Newport National Bank is a historic bank building located at Newport, New Castle County, Delaware. It was built in 1864, and is a 2 1/2-story, five bay by three bay, brick building with a gable roof. It has a two-story service wing. The building was renovated in 1927 in the Colonial Revival style. The buildings contained both a residence and the bank, reflecting bank rules which required that the cashier and family reside in the building as a security measure.

It was added to the National Register of Historic Places in 1993.
