= Lewis Weldin House =

Historic house in Delaware, US

- U.S. National Register of Historic Places
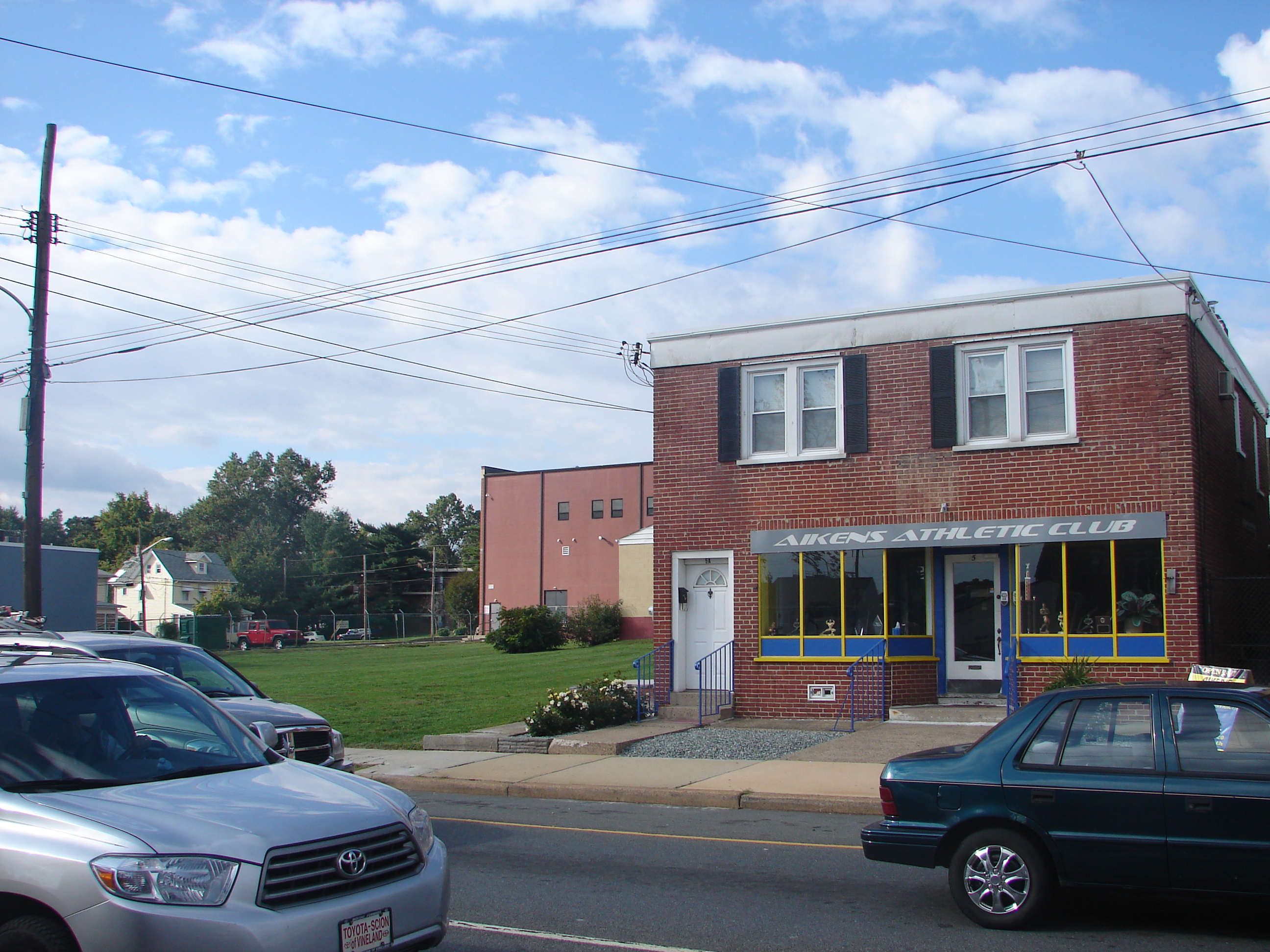
- 7-9 W. Market, October 2011

- Location within Delaware Location within the United States
- Location: 7-9 W. Market St., Newport, Delaware
- Coordinates: 39.713887°N 75.610118°W
- Area: less than one acre
- Architectural style: Vernacular,
- MPS: Newport Delaware MPS
- NRHP reference No.: 93000632
- Added to NRHP: July 14, 1993

Lewis Weldin House was a historic home located at Newport, New Castle County, Delaware. It was a two-story gable-roofed brick building, seven bays wide. It was built in the late 18th century as a residential/commercial building, and renovated in 1863 by Lewis Weldin to serve as his residence. The building was demolished between 2007 and 2009.

It was added to the National Register of Historic Places in 1993.
