= Mark Levine (Virginia politician) =

American politician

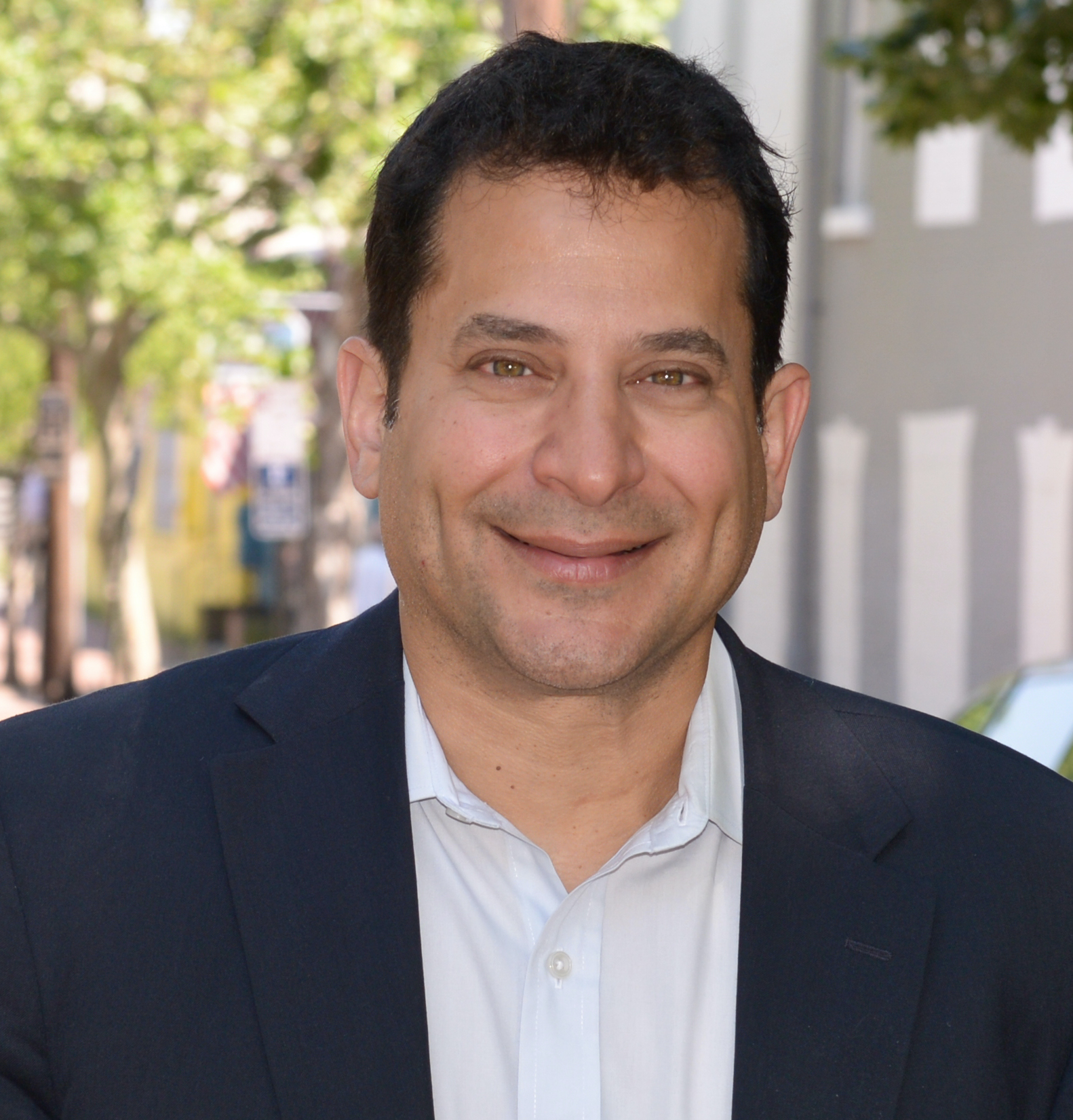

Member of the Virginia House of Delegates from the 45th district
- In office January 13, 2016 – January 12, 2022
- Preceded by: Rob Krupicka
- Succeeded by: Elizabeth Bennett-Parker

Personal details
- Born: Mark H. Levine; May 7, 1966 (age 60) Nashville, Tennessee, U.S.
- Party: Democratic
- Education: Harvard University (AB); Yale University (JD)

Mark H. Levine (born May 7, 1966) is an American politician and attorney who served as the Delegate from the 45th District of the Virginia House of Delegates from 2016 to 2022. A member of the Democratic Party, he simultaneously ran for Lieutenant Governor of Virginia in the 2021 election and for reelection as a Delegate on June 8, 2021, but lost in the Democratic primaries to Hala Ayala and Elizabeth Bennett-Parker, respectively.

Levine is a constitutional lawyer who was an early advocate for same-sex marriage in the United States. He has hosted a nationally syndicated progressive public policy radio program and has worked as a television pundit.

Levine was the third openly gay person and third openly LGBT person elected to the Virginia House of Delegates and the Virginia General Assembly (after Adam Ebbin and Mark Sickles).

== Early life and education ==
Born in Nashville, Tennessee, Levine earned an economics degree, magna cum laude, from Harvard University and was a Fulbright scholar in Switzerland. He later earned a Juris Doctor from Yale Law School.

== Career ==
=== Early career ===
Levine worked as a Nazi hunter, Jewish historian, and inner-city schoolteacher before becoming a trial attorney at Hughes Hubbard & Reed LLP in Los Angeles.

=== Perry March Saga ===
In 1996, Levine's sister Janet Levine March was murdered by her husband Perry; her body has never been found and it took a decade to amass enough other evidence to convict him. In response, Levine drafted a Tennessee law to protect victims of domestic violence and their children. The law passed unanimously.

Four years later, Levine and his parents traveled to Ajijic, Mexico, where March was living with his children by Janet, to see them under a 39-day visitation period ordered by a court in Illinois, where March had last resided in the U.S. Accompanied by a Mexican judge, who had given local effect to the Illinois court order, and armed police, they took the children to the airport and back to Tennessee, an action beyond that authorized in either court order. Mexican arrest warrants were issued for Levine and his parents afterwards. The warrants were later nullified by a Mexican court on the grounds that the removal of the children from Mexico "was carried out legally and by competent authority".

A federal court in Nashville ordered the children returned to March in Mexico on the grounds that his in-laws had violated the federal laws that give effect to the Hague Convention on the Civil Aspects of International Child Abduction; the order was sustained on appeal.

Levine later testified in court against Perry, who was eventually sentenced to 56 years in prison for murdering Janet and, later, conspiring to attempt to have Levine's parents killed. According to The Washington Post, the murder investigation spawned "Levine's interest in lawmaking."

=== Gay rights advocacy ===
In 1994, Levine helped organize a march on Hollywood and met personally with high-ranking studio executives to demand they depict gay and lesbian characters in a positive light.

In 1999, Levine was one of the four original founders of Marriage Equality California. He "barnstormed across California to oppose Proposition 22 and then arranged America's first public "mass-marriage" protest for gay and lesbian couples. This modest attempt on February 14, 2000 to marry at a Beverly Hills courthouse became the first of the "Valentine's Day Marriage Protests" that would later sweep the country. Levine writes he:

promised the police and court officials that we would not be violent in any way. And court officials, in turn, graciously agreed to waive the marriage license fee, since we all knew they would reject our attempts to get married. I remember it was a beautiful day, and a joyful one: We all smiled ear-to-ear knowing we were attempting something that was then impossible but which every one of us thought would eventually become possible.

Later that year, Levine drafted the first law introduced in the United States to give lesbian and gay couples equal rights to straight couples at both the state and federal levels. Levine's law, introduced in California in February 2001 as AB 1338 by Assemblyman Paul Koretz, went further than Vermont's civil unions law which only protected same-sex couples at the state level. Levine says local and nationwide gay and lesbian organizations opposed Levine's marriage equality law at the time as too "radical" and "politically impossible" and forced Koretz to withdraw it. At the time Levine's bill was introduced, no same-sex couples could get married anywhere in the world.

Although Levine's first legislation to help same-sex couples did not become law, his second attempt was a success. In 2009, Levine worked with Councilman Phil Mendelson to draft the District of Columbia's marriage equality law which passed 11-2 and then represented the Gertrude Stein Democratic Club pro bono in court to defeat the opponents of the new law who wanted to put it up for a referendum vote. Levine successfully argued in court that such a referendum would be a violation of D.C.'s Human Rights Act."

=== Challenge to Bush v. Gore ===
In 2001, Levine called President Bush's selection by the Supreme Court to be President "illegitimate" and argued: "If we can't have the right to vote then how can we start thinking about anything else?" Michael Moore has called Levine's explanation of the Bush v. Gore opinion a "Simple Q&A that Every American Should Read" and "the best thing he's seen" on the issue.

In December 2000, Levine was hired by the Congressional Black Caucus to appeal the United States Supreme Court decision in Bush v. Gore to the United States Congress. At the joint session of Congress, when it came time to count Florida's electoral votes, the Congressional Black Caucus presented the legal challenge Levine had drafted. If the action had succeeded, it would have prevented George W. Bush from becoming President of the United States. The legal appeal was rejected, and members of the Congressional Black Caucus and several other House Members walked out in protest.

=== Legislative counsel to Barney Frank ===
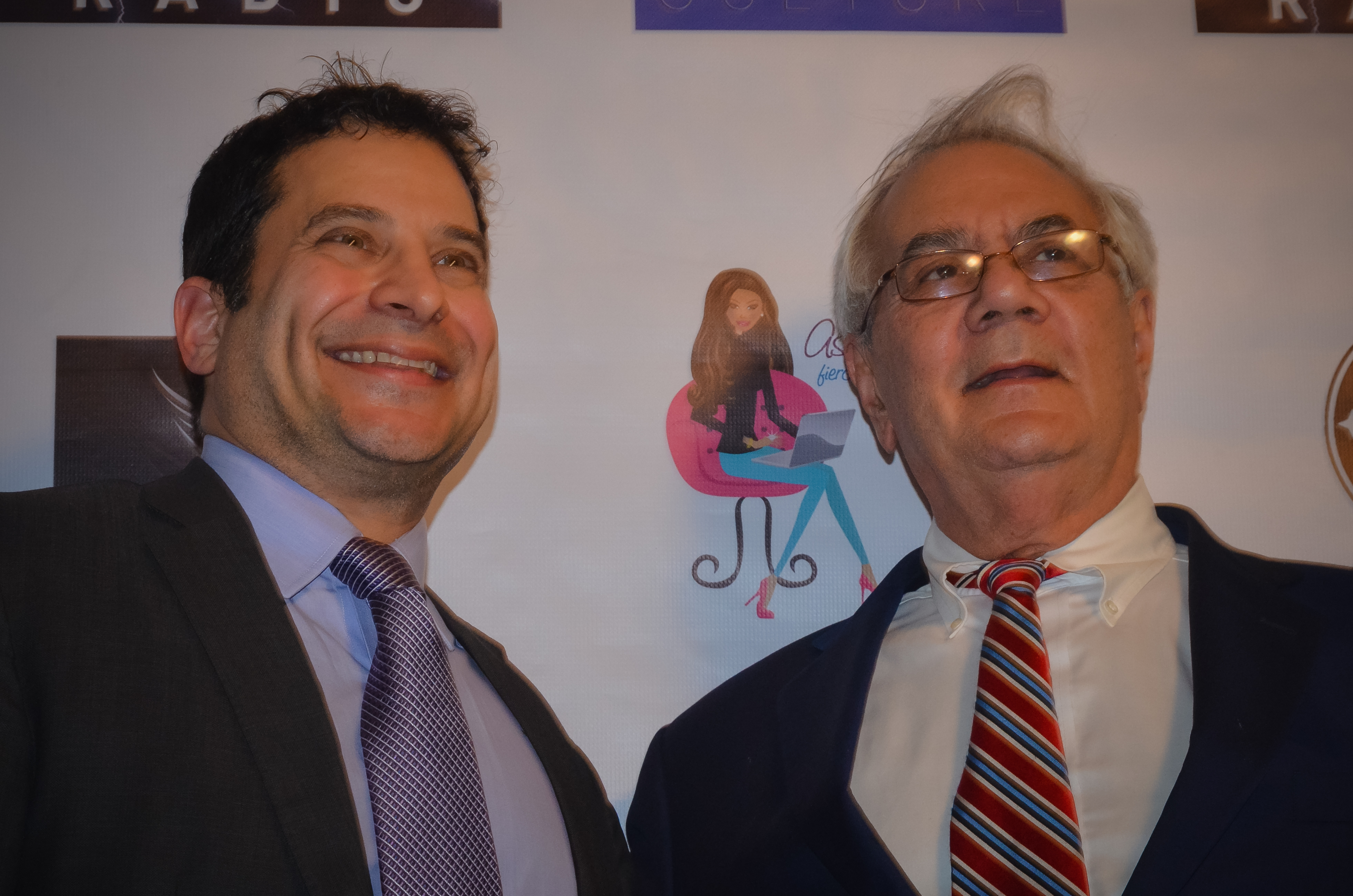
Mark Levine and Barney Frank

In January 2001, Levine moved from California to Alexandria, Virginia to serve three years as chief legislative counsel to Barney Frank, a high-ranking Democrat on the Judiciary, Homeland Security, and Financial Services Committees. In that capacity Levine says he learned how Washington really works: from the way bills become law to political negotiations, spin, administration secrets, and dangerous lapses in American security. While working for Frank, Levine used bipartisan back channels to ensure that LGBT 9/11 survivors were treated equally in distributions from the victims compensation fund. He also personally persuaded Hillary Clinton to withdraw her endorsement from President Bush's faith-based initiative, which would have allowed the federal government to discriminate on the basis of religion. Levine credits his one-on-one conversation with Clinton as what "killed" the initiative.

=== Talk-radio and investigative journalism ===
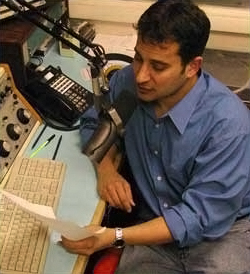
Levine in 2003

In 2003, Levine began hosting the radio show Mark Levine's Inside Scoop on Washington on WAGE in Leesburg, Virginia and began in 2005 his local Fairfax County, Virginia television show The Inside Scoop. Levine has also hosted The AM Alternative, co-hosted The Raucous Caucus and News Views, and served as a weekly guest host of The Leslie Marshall Show. Levine was the only non-African-American host on XM/Sirius The Power. Today, Levine's program is carried on 43 radio stations nationwide and locally on WPFW (89.3 FM)'s Pacifica Radio. From July to December 2007, Levine hosted the television show The American Dream on Press TV, until, he says, Press TV tried to censor him. Levine also has served as an investigative journalist, doing stories uncovering spies at the FBI and spreading the word in 2006 about the national government monitoring the telephone calls of the vast majority of ordinary American citizens. Levine has broken national stories such as "Why the FBI Squelched an Investigation of a Post-9/11 Meeting Between White Supremacist and Islamic Extremists" and the rape, torture, and abuse of American teenagers in lockup boot camps, wilderness camps, and reform schools. Levine often follows up his investigative stories with legislative action. For example, he worked with Congressman George Miller (D-CA) to craft legislation to protect American teenagers from this institutional abuse.

Since 2009, Levine has frequently appeared as a pundit on FOX News, CNBC, MSNBC, Fox Business, RT, CNN Headline News, and many other television stations locally, nationally, and worldwide. Levine is well known and occasionally mocked for keeping a Constitution in his pocket when he debates on air.

=== 2014 congressional campaign ===
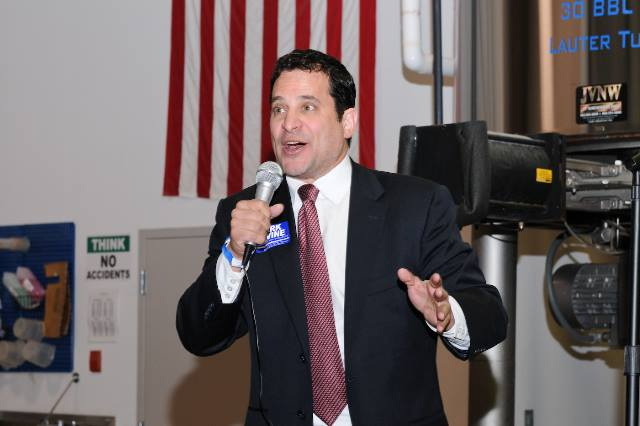
Levine speaking in Alexandria, 2014

On February 18, 2014, Levine became one of ten candidates entering the June 10, 2014, Democratic primary to succeed retiring representative Jim Moran.

Levine said he would distinguish himself from the other candidates by being "an aggressive progressive who doesn't just cast one out of 435 votes." With his media savvy, Levine said, "we can go over the heads of the Republican Party to the American people."

=== Virginia House of Delegates ===
On June 9, 2015, Levine won a five-way Democratic primary to represent Virginia's 45th District in the House of Delegates. On November 3, 2015, facing no opposition in the general election, Levine won with 95% of the vote.

In January 2016, Levine co-founded, with Republican senator Amanda Chase, the Virginia Transparency Caucus, a bi-partisan bi-cameral caucus of the Virginia General Assembly designed to bring transparency to state government. By 2017, 85 of Virginia's 140 delegates and senators had joined the caucus.

In February 2017, Levine faced a primary challenge from the former chair of the Alexandria School Board Karen Graf, who said she had "no particular criticism of Levine." In that primary campaign, Levine garnered the endorsement of Virginia Governor Terry McAuliffe and 36 other state and local officials. Graf dropped out of the race a month after entering it, leaving Levine unopposed in the Democratic primary.

On November 7, 2017, facing no opposition in the general election, Levine won re-election to represent Virginia's 45th District in the House of Delegates with more than 95% of the vote. His vote total of 31,417 was the highest of any candidate in the General Assembly in that election, as he was the only House of Delegates candidate that year to receive more than 30,000 votes.

On November 3, 2019, facing no primary or general-election opposition, Levine won re-election to his third term. After the 2019 election, Levine sat on the Courts of Justice; Privileges and Elections; Health, Welfare and Institutions; and Public Safety committees. He was the Public Safety Subcommittee Chair and the chair of the Constitutional Amendments Subcommittee.

On June 8, 2021, Levine lost renomination to Alexandria City Councilwoman Elizabeth Bennett-Parker 59.24%-40.76% on the same day Levine lost to Hala Ayala in the Democratic primary for lieutenant governor.

== Personal life ==
Levine is Jewish. He describes himself as "someone who goes out and strives to achieve the impossible and sometimes succeeds". He has stated that he bases his political philosophy on the Jewish principle of tikkun olam: "We have to do our duty. If I see something that I think is unjust I just want to change it".
