= Newport, Delaware =

- Town
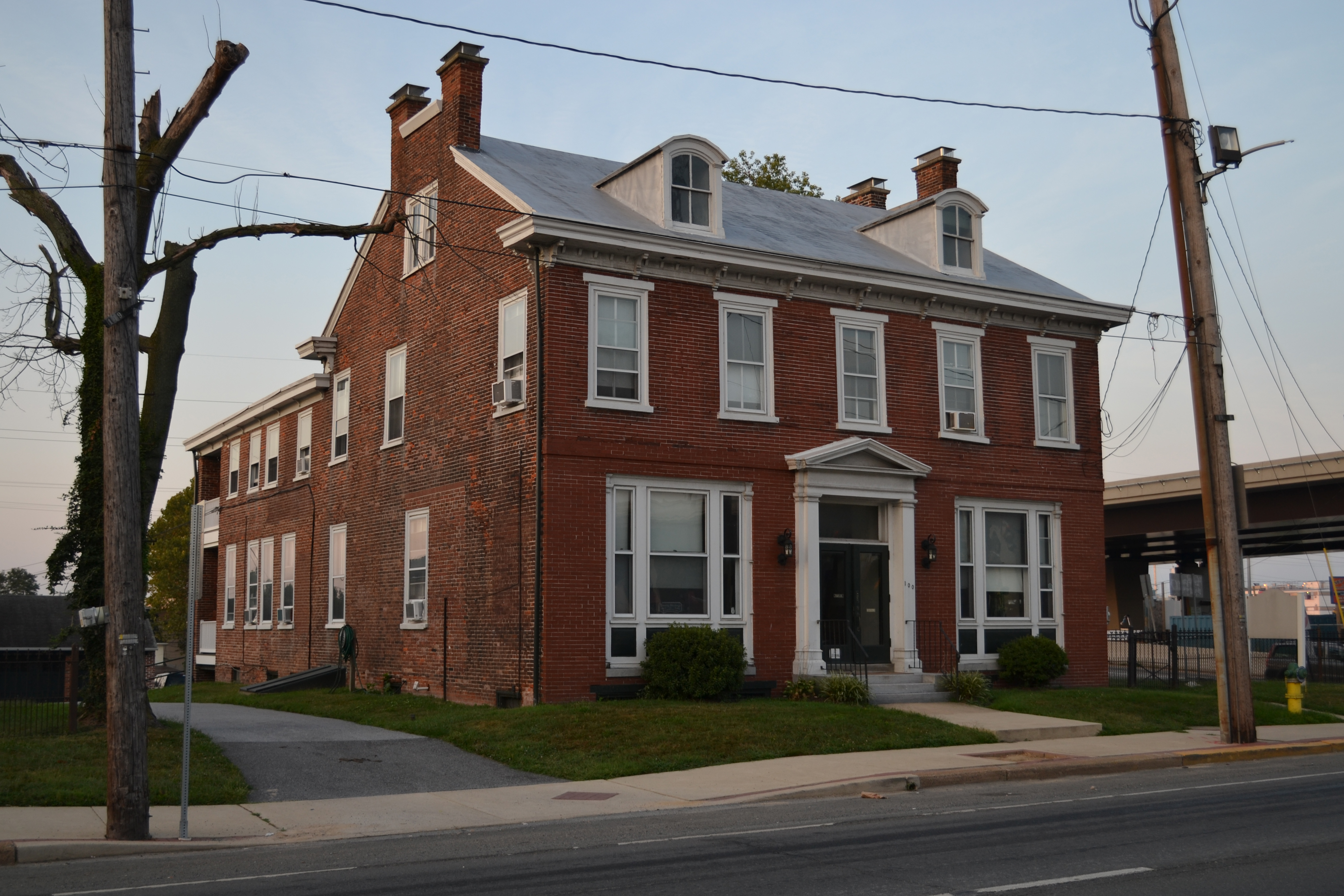
- Newport National Bank

- Seal Logo

- Location of Newport in New Castle County, Delaware.

- Location within the state of Delaware Newport (the United States)
- Coordinates: 39°42′49″N 75°36′34″W
- Country: United States
- State: Delaware
- County: New Castle
- Settled: 1735
- Incorporated: 1873

Government
  - Mayor: Michael Spencer

Area
  - Total: 0.48 sq mi (1.25 km^{2})
  - Land: 0.47 sq mi (1.21 km^{2})
  - Water: 0.015 sq mi (0.04 km^{2})
- Elevation: 33 ft (10 m)

Population (2020)
  - Total: 910
  - Density: 1,951.5/sq mi (753.47/km^{2})
- Time zone: UTC−5 (Eastern (EST))
  - Summer (DST): UTC−4 (EDT)
- ZIP code: 19804
- Area code: 302
- FIPS code: 10-51190
- GNIS feature ID: 214388
- Website: newport.delaware.gov

Newport is a town in New Castle County, Delaware, United States. It is on the Christina River. It is best known for being the home of colonial inventor Oliver Evans. As of the 2020 census, Newport had a population of 910. Four limited access highways, I-95, I-295, I-495, and Delaware Route 141 intersect within one mile (1.6 km) of the town.

== Geography ==
Newport is located at 39°42′49″N 75°36′34″W (39.7137238, −75.6093709).

According to the United States Census Bureau, the town has an area of 0.4 square miles (1.0 km^{2}), of which 2.22% is water.

== History ==
Prior to European settlement, the Minquas (or Susquehannock) peoples lived in and around modern-day Newport. This heritage is reflected in the name of the Minquas Fire Company, Newport's volunteer fire company.

The first land grant for the area were awarded to the Duke of York in 1641. In 1735, longtime area resident and businessman John Justis purchased 100 acres (0.40 km^{2}) and several years later the streets of a town called Newport-Ayre were laid out. According to Newport histories, Justis saw the area's potential as a commercial crossroads and a port.

George Washington passed through during the Revolutionary War during preparations for the Battle of the Brandywine in 1777. The town dropped "Ayre" from its name by the time what would become the U.S. Postal Service opened a branch office there in 1793.

Newport became a center of commerce in the early 19th century, as Conestoga wagons transported farm products from as far away as Lancaster County, Pennsylvania to Newport's docks on the Christina River, where the supplies were loaded on ships bound for Boston, New York and Philadelphia. The town's important role in trade ebbed as new roads favored the larger town of Wilmington and the railroad reached the area in 1837.

Newport incorporated in 1873 and became a manufacturing center, boasting chemical works, glue factory and iron works in 1900. Henrik J. Krebs, founder of Krebs Pigments and Chemical Company, built a plant in town in 1908. The facility was purchased by DuPont in 1929 and sold to Ciba-Geigy in 1984.

The Armstrong Lodge No. 26, A.F. & A.M., Collison House, Galloway-Walker House, Killgore Hall, Joseph Killgore House, Newport National Bank, Newport Railroad Station, Joseph Tatnall House, Lewis Weldin House, and Woman's Club of Newport are listed on the National Register of Historic Places.

== Economy ==
Newport has several small industries within its borders, including a BASF pigment manufacturing plant.

The General Motors Wilmington Assembly automobile manufacturing facility was located on Boxwood Road just north of the town and operated from 1947 to 2009. In October 2009, Fisker Automotive announced it would begin manufacturing electric automobiles at the Boxwood Road location. However, the plant never opened and was later demolished to make room for an Amazon warehouse.

== Education ==
Newport is served by the Red Clay Consolidated School District for public education.

Richey Elementary School (grades K–5) is located in town proper off of East Highland Avenue. Public school students in Newport in grades 6 through 8 attend Stanton Middle School in Stanton while students in grades 9 through 12 attend John Dickinson High School northwest of Newport in Pike Creek.

Conrad Schools of Science and Delaware Military Academy, magnet high schools, are located just outside the town. Richardson park elementary school is also located just outside of the town.

== Infrastructure ==
=== Transportation ===
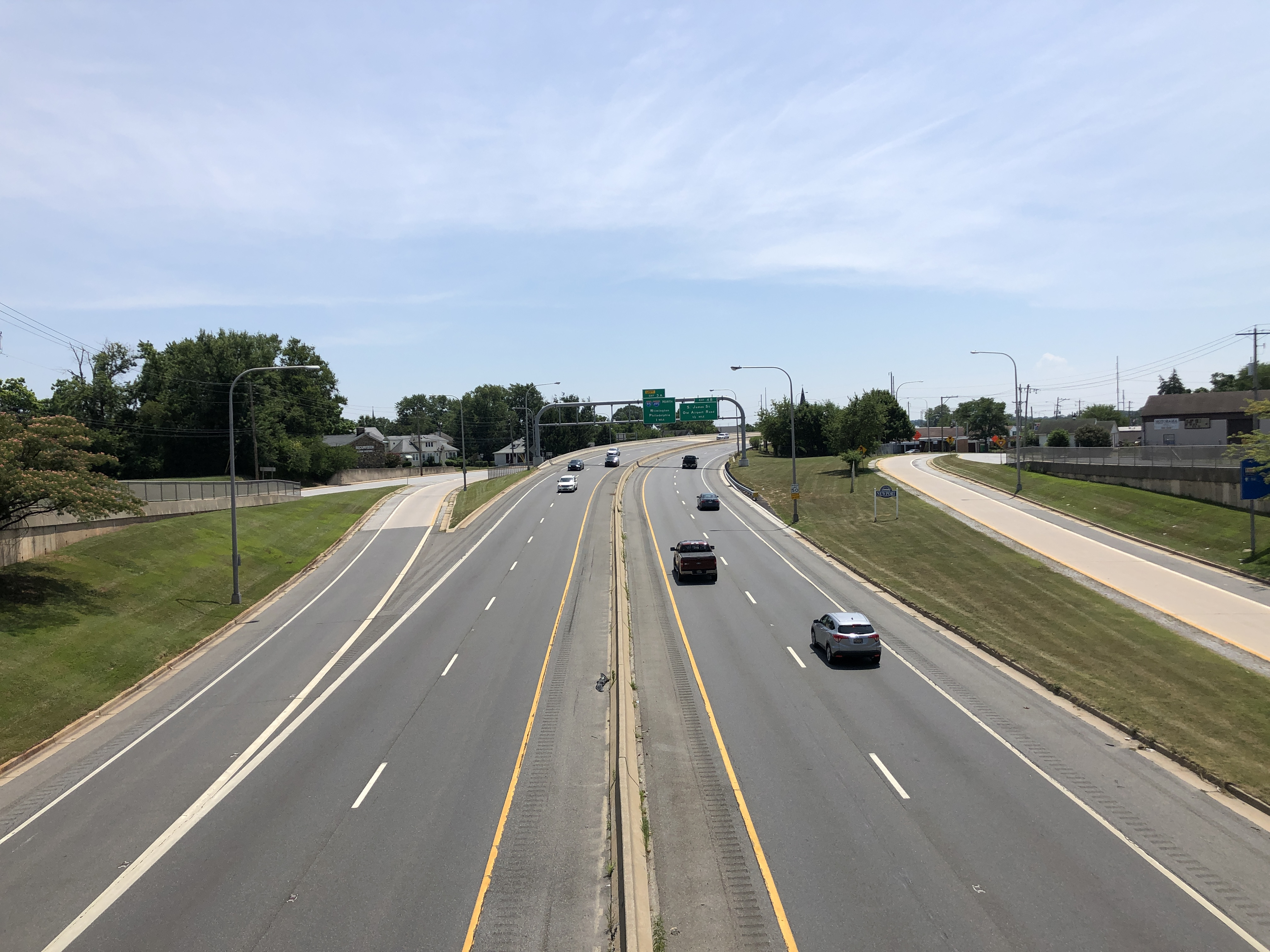
DE 141 southbound in Newport

Delaware Route 141 is the main road providing access to Newport. It follows an elevated freeway on a north–south alignment through Newport, with James Street and Marshall Street serving as frontage roads. DE 141 heads south to an interchange with Interstate 95, Interstate 295, and Interstate 495 just to the south of Newport and continues on to New Castle, while it heads north and east as a western bypass of Wilmington to U.S. Route 202 in Fairfax. Delaware Route 41 and Delaware Route 62 form the majority of the Delaware portion of the Newport Gap Pike which connects Newport to Gap, Pennsylvania and also serves as a local route to Lancaster, Pennsylvania as it eventually absorbs Lancaster Pike (Delaware Route 48) in Hockessin. Delaware Route 4 serves as the main east–west road through Newport, passing through the town on the one-way pair of Market Street eastbound and Justis Street westbound and becoming Newport Pike outside the town. DE 4 heads northeast to Wilmington and southwest to Christiana and Newark.

DART First State provides bus service to Newport along Route 5, which follows DE 4 and heads northeast to Wilmington and southwest to the Christiana Mall. The Northeast Corridor rail line that carries Amtrak and SEPTA Regional Rail's Wilmington/Newark Line passes through Newport but no trains stop in the town; the nearest station serving Amtrak and SEPTA trains is Wilmington station.

=== Utilities ===
Delmarva Power, a subsidiary of Exelon, provides electricity and natural gas to Newport. Suez Delaware, a subsidiary of Suez North America, provides water to Newport. Sewer service in Newport is provided by New Castle County. Trash and recycling collection in Newport is provided under contract by Waste Management.

== Sports ==
The Stanton-Newport Little League Girls Softball team were Little League Senior League Softball Champions in 1999.

== Demographics ==
Historical population
Census	Pop.	Note	%±
1880	535		—
1890	711		32.9%
1900	657		−7.6%
1910	722		9.9%
1920	676		−6.4%
1930	947		40.1%
1940	987		4.2%
1950	1,171		18.6%
1960	1,239		5.8%
1970	1,366		10.3%
1980	1,167		−14.6%
1990	1,240		6.3%
2000	1,122		−9.5%
2010	1,055		−6.0%
2020	910		−13.7%
U.S. Decennial Census

As of the census of 2000, there were 1,122 people, 456 households, and 290 families residing in the town. The population density was 2,554.0 inhabitants per square mile (986.1/km^{2}). There were 490 housing units at an average density of 1,115.4 per square mile (430.7/km^{2}). The racial makeup of the town was 75.76% White, 10.61% African American, 0.80% Native American, 1.69% Asian, 5.08% from other races, and 6.06% from two or more races. Hispanic or Latino of any race were 13.55% of the population.

There were 456 households, out of which 35.3% had children under the age of 18 living with them, 36.2% were married couples living together, 17.5% had a female householder with no husband present, and 36.4% were non-families. 25.7% of all households were made up of individuals, and 8.6% had someone living alone who was 65 years of age or older. The average household size was 2.46 and the average family size was 2.89.

In the town, the population was spread out, with 26.0% under the age of 18, 11.5% from 18 to 24, 36.5% from 25 to 44, 17.5% from 45 to 64, and 8.5% who were 65 years of age or older. The median age was 32 years. For every 100 females, there were 101.4 males. For every 100 females age 18 and over, there were 96.2 males.

The median income for a household in the town was $38,864, and the median income for a family was $41,771. Males had a median income of $32,917 versus $26,420 for females. The per capita income for the town was $19,590. About 9.9% of families and 11.8% of the population were below the poverty line, including 17.3% of those under age 18 and 8.9% of those age 65 or over.

== Notable people ==
- Oliver Evans, inventor
- Dallas Green, Major League Baseball pitcher and manager of the 1980 World Series champion Philadelphia Phillies
- Henry Latimer, United States Representative and Senator
