= Jacob Cress =

American furniture maker (1944–2026)

Jacob Francis Cress (November 22, 1944 – May 19, 2026), better known as Jake Cress, was an American furniture maker in Fincastle, Virginia who is known for his interpretations of classical 18th century furniture. He considered himself to be a cabinet maker and not an artist. He also built normal classical furniture, miniature furniture, and carved boxes, as well as decorative pieces. He also restored furniture. Additionally, he built more modern pieces like country tables and desks. Cress worked with mahogany, walnut, and cherry woods. His animated works include "The Decorator," "Alladin's Lamp," "Hickory Dickory Dock Clock," "Self-Portrait," and "Clock Face." Cress crafted each piece of furniture by hand in his shop without sketching the furniture before he began working on it.

== Early life and education ==
Cress was born in Norton, Virginia, on November 22, 1944. He graduated from John I. Burton High School, where he failed woodworking. He then joined the Navy in 1963 and attended Columbia School of Broadcasting in New York while he served. When he left the Navy, he worked for a radio station in Virginia. He moved to New York and acted in off-Broadway productions.

== Furniture ==
Cress returned to Virginia, where he opened up a cabinet-making business with his brother Joe in 1974 in Abingdon. He continued to act in community theater while he worked with his brother for several years. Cress married Phebe Fullerton and the couple eventually moved to Fincastle, Virginia, where Cress' shop currently is. Cress left his business with his brother and began creating his own furniture and opened his own shop. Cress was inspired by furniture he found in different antique shops. Cress continued his acting career in local theaters and he played the marshal in the 1993 movie "Sommersby."

=== Animated furniture ===
The first piece of animated furniture that Cress created was "Crippled Table," named by a friend of Cress' who had a leg damaged by childhood Polio. The table has one leg replaced by a carved crutch. His other pieces include a clock based on the "Hickory Dock," nursery rhyme, called the "Hickory Dickory Dock Clock," one of which was sold through Sotheby's and another of which is in the Indianapolis Children's Museum. "How to Build Furniture," a table with one shorter leg resting on a book and "Peel Here," a table that appears to peel back revealing a checkerboard, are other works. Cress has also animated other chairs through his "Self Portrait," chairs: chairs that are animated and appear to be building themselves.

Cress' chair "Oops!" is the most famous of his animated furniture and the ninth one Cress created was displayed in the Renwick Gallery, Smithsonian Museum and is now in the museum's permanent American Furniture collection. "Oops!", made in 1991 is featured in the permanent collection of Yale. "Oops!" is a Chippendale-style chair that is animated, including legs that have claws holding the traditional balls at the bottom of the chair in place. One of the claws has lost its ball, leading to the name "Oops!". Other features of the chair include eyes and a slanted chair frame and legs. Cress made 10 of the "Oops!" chairs, all but one of which have been sold.

=== Media, collaborations and exhibitions ===
Cress has been featured in The Washington Post and American Art Magazine and is featured in the Virginia tourism site under "The Arts. "

In 2011, Cress had an exhibition featuring his work in Abingdon, Virginia at the William King Museum. The exhibition was titled "Mischief-Making: Contemporary Craftsman Jake Cress," and included a carving workshop.

Cress collaborated with painter Mark Young to create "The Decorator," a realist oil painting that extends outwards physically through hand crafted furniture. From the painting, a chair's arm, created by Jake Cress, reaches out and places a flower into a vase that rests on a table built by Cress. The table stands under the painting. The chairs featured in the painting are Cress' animated chairs. "The Decorator" was featured at the King William Museum.

== Personal life and death ==
Cress' home, which included his furniture gallery and he and his wife's bed and breakfast, was furnished with his furniture, some of which is for sale. In later life Cress continued to work in his shop in Fincastle. He died on May 19, 2026, at the age of 81.
