= James L. Camblos =

American politician (1888–1970)

Member of the Virginia House of Delegates representing Wise County
- In office January 11, 1956 – January 8, 1964 Serving with Orby L. Cantrell
- Preceded by: T. Monroe Bates
- In office January 14, 1948 – January 9, 1952 Serving with T. Monroe Bates
- Succeeded by: Orby L. Cantrell

Personal details
- Born: James Lyle Camblos; January 23, 1888 Philadelphia, Pennsylvania, U.S.
- Died: July 11, 1970 (aged 82) Asheville, North Carolina, U.S.
- Resting place: Glencoe Cemetery
- Party: Democratic
- Spouse(s): Margaret Bullitt (m. 1913; died 1935) Louise Borum (m. 1951)
- Children: 4
- Education: University of Virginia School of Law (LLB)
- Occupation: Politician; lawyer; businessman

James Lyle Camblos (January 23, 1888 – July 11, 1970) was an American politician and lawyer from Virginia. He served as a member of the Virginia House of Delegates from 1948 to 1950 and from 1956 to 1964.

== Early life ==
James Lyle Camblos was born on January 23, 1888, in Philadelphia, Pennsylvania, to Ellen Lyle (née Morris) and Pierre Camblos. He attended the Episcopal Academy and Blight Preparatory School in Philadelphia. He graduated from the University of Virginia School of Law with a Bachelor of Laws in 1913. He was a member of Delta Phi fraternity and was a founder of the University of Virginia chapter of Rho Delta Phi.

== Career ==
Camblos was a corporate attorney. He was town attorney of Big Stone Gap. He was a lawyer with Heazel and Camblos of Kingsport from 1916 to 1918, J. L. Camblos of Norton from 1918 to 1927, and Chalkley and Camblos of Big Stone Gap from 1927 to 1932. He was associate counsel to Stonega Coke and Coal Company and its affiliated companies from 1932 to 1935. He was vice president of the Virginia Coal and Iron Company from 1954 to 1955. He retired in 1955 and continued with a private practice in Big Stone Gap.

Camblos was a Democrat. He was a member of the board of mayor and alderman in Kingsport, Tennessee, from 1917 to 1918. He was mayor of Norton, Virginia, from 1922 to 1924. He was judge of juvenile and domestic relations court of Wise County from 1926 to 1930. He served as a member of the Virginia House of Delegates, representing Wise County and Norton from 1948 to 1950 and from 1956 to 1964. He helped promote the highway system. He was a member of Governor J. Lindsay Almond's legislative redistricting commission. He was a member of the appropriations, privileges and elections, and mining and mineral resources committees. In 1963, after his re-election defeat, he was appointed commissioner of accounts for Wise County. He helped locate the community college to Big Stone Gap.

Camblos was director of First National Bank, Clear Creek Water Company, Cumberland Water Company, Appalachia and Virginia Wholesale Company and Central Supply Company of Andover. He was charter member and served as president of the Lonesome Pine Country Club of Big Stone Gap.

== Personal life ==
Camblos married Margaret Bullitt of Big Stone Gap on November 27, 1913. She died in 1935. They had two sons and two daughters, Joshua Fry Bullitt, John Taggart, Margaret Talbott and Martha Bullitt. He married Louise Borum of Big Stone Gap on July 14, 1951. He was a member and superintendent of the Sunday School at Christ Episcopal Church in Big Stone Gap. He was also a member of All Saints Church in Norton.

Camblos died on July 11, 1970, at a hospital in Asheville, North Carolina. He was buried in Glencoe Cemetery.
