= Woman's Club of Newport =

- U.S. National Register of Historic Places
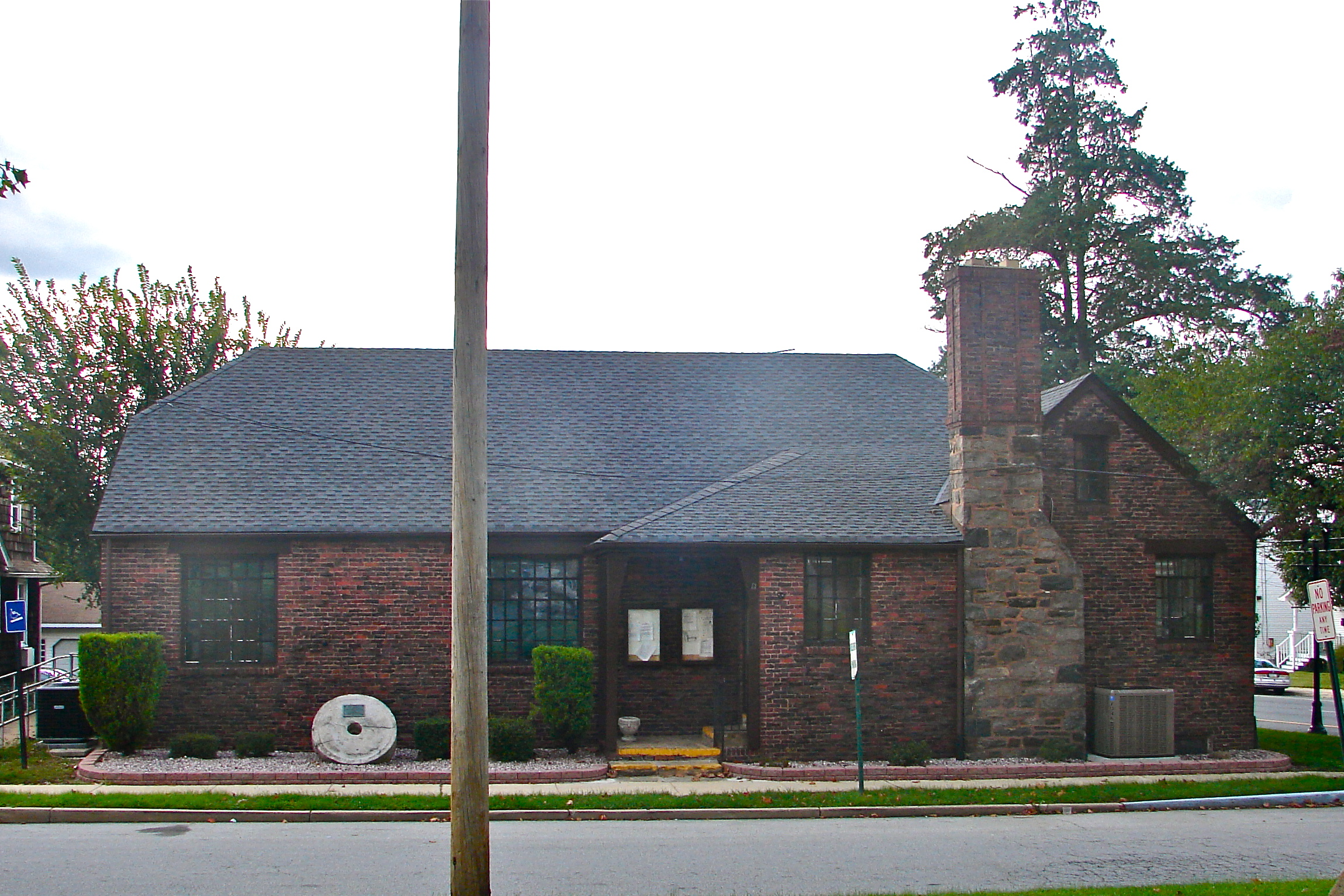
- Newport Town Hall, October 2011

- Location within Delaware Location within the United States
- Location: 15 N. Augustine St., Newport, Delaware
- Coordinates: 39.714821°N 75.606056°W
- Area: less than one acre
- Built: 1934
- Architectural style: Tudor Revival
- MPS: Newport Delaware MPS
- NRHP reference No.: 93000629
- Added to NRHP: July 14, 1993

Woman's Club of Newport, also known as Newport Town Hall, is a historic clubhouse located at Newport, New Castle County, Delaware. It was built in 1934, and is a one-story, T-plan building in the Tudor Revival style. It has a three-bay-wide, two-bay-deep, gable roofed main block with a broad wing extend to the rear, resulting in a T configuration. The roof of the wing is slightly higher than that of the front section, and terminates in a clipped "jerkinhead" gable. Originally built for the Woman's Club of Newport, in 1976, the clubhouse was sold to the Town of Newport for use as a town hall.

It was added to the National Register of Historic Places in 1993.
