= Elizabeth Bennett-Parker =

Virginia Senate member

Member of the Virginia Senate
- Incumbent
- Assumed office February 18, 2026
- Preceded by: Adam Ebbin
- Constituency: 39th district

Member of the Virginia House of Delegates
- In office January 12, 2022 – February 18, 2026
- Preceded by: Mark Levine
- Succeeded by: R. Kirk McPike
- Constituency: 45th district (2022–2024); 5th district (2024–2026)

Personal details
- Born: Elizabeth Barclay Bennett Alexandria, Virginia, U.S.
- Party: Democratic
- Spouse: Stephen Parker
- Children: 1
- Education: Cornell University (BA); University of London (MA)

Elizabeth Barclay Bennett-Parker is an American politician and former nonprofit executive. A member of the Democratic Party, she has been a member of the Virginia State Senate from the Virginia's 39th Senate district since 2026. District 39 all of Alexandria and parts of Arlington County and Fairfax County. Bennett-Parker previously served in the Virginia House of Delegates from the 5th district from 2022 to 2026.

== Early life and early career ==
Bennett-Parker was born to two naval officers in Alexandria, Virginia. She attended Cornell University where she received a Bachelor of Arts in History and the University of London where she earned her master's degree.

She co-led Together We Bake, a non-profit job training and personal development program and founded Fruitcycle, a social enterprise that combated food waste.

== Political career ==
=== Alexandria City Council ===
Bennett-Parker served on the Alexandria City Council from 2019 to 2021 and was Vice Mayor of Alexandria from 2019 to 2021.

=== Virginia House of Delegates ===
Bennett-Parker ran in the 2021 election, and in the primary defeated incumbent delegate Mark Levine, who was simultaneously running for lieutenant governor, with 59.24% of the vote. In the general election she defeated Republican J.D. Maddox with 73.68% of the vote.

Bennett-Parker ran unopposed for re-election in 2023.

=== Virginia Senate ===
In February 2026, Bennett-Parker won in the Special general election for Virginia State Senate District 39 against Julie Robbens Lineberry. Her win secured a Democratic hold on the seat after Adam Ebbin resigned to join Abigail Spanberger’s administration.

== Political positions ==
=== Voting rights ===
Bennett-Parker, during her time in the Virginia House of Delegates, patroned the proposed amendment to Virginia's Constitution that would restore voting rights to Virginians who had been convicted of felonies once their sentences in prison had been completed and that would remove the provision prohibiting those who had been found mentally incapacitated from voting, instead requiring an individual court order for the right to vote to be removed.

== Personal life ==
Bennett-Parker is married to Stephen Parker. The couple reside in Alexandria, Virginia, and have a newborn daughter. When the Virginia General Assembly is not in session, Bennett-Parker is a substitute teacher for Alexandria City Public Schools.
