= Newport station (Delaware) =

Newport
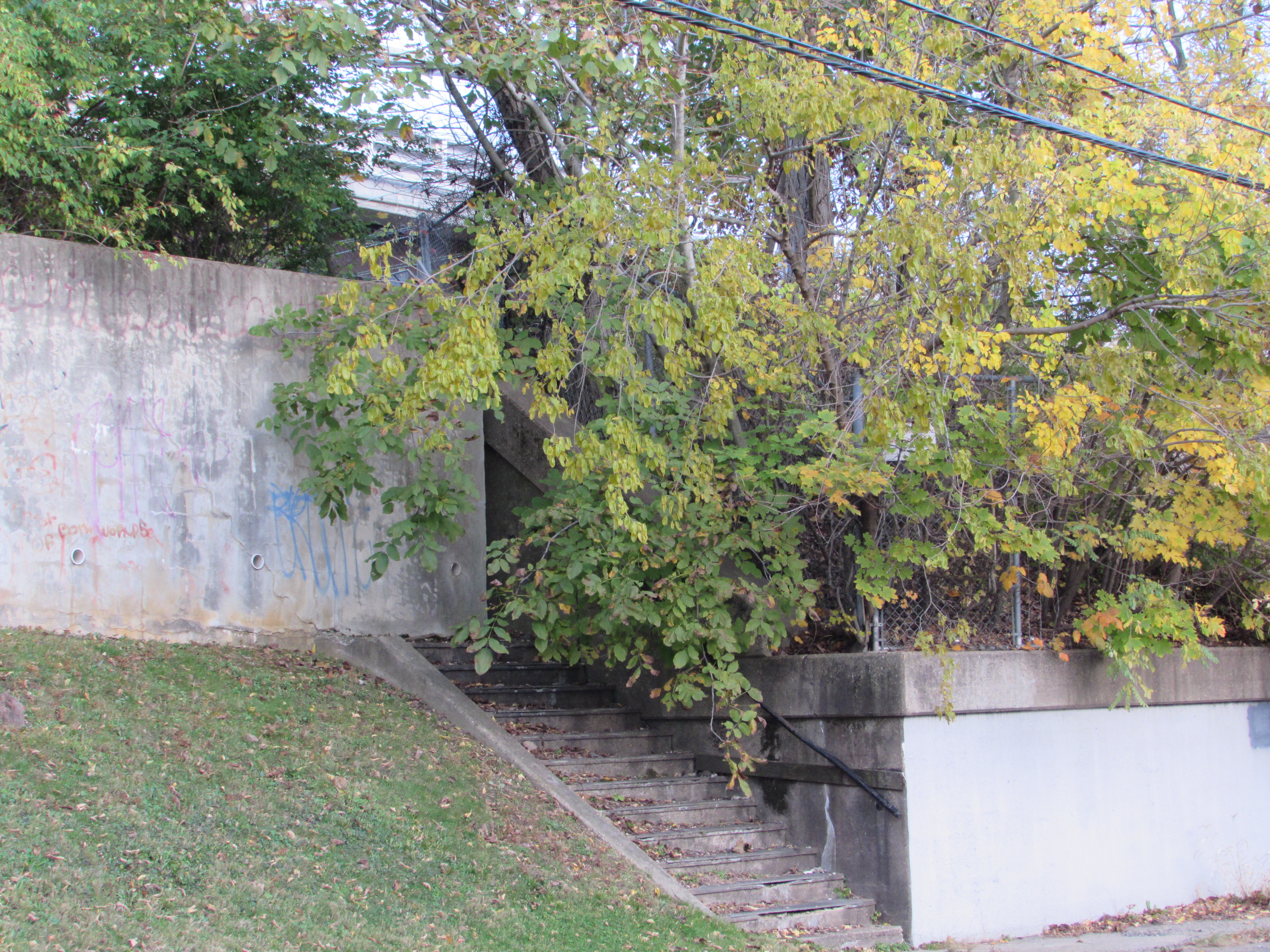
- Stairs leading to the site of the Newport station

General information
- Location: 112 South James Street, Newport, Delaware
- Line: Philadelphia, Wilmington and Baltimore Railroad

Former services
| Preceding station | Pennsylvania Railroad | Following station |
|---|---|---|
| Stanton toward Washington, D.C. | Philadelphia, Wilmington and Baltimore Railroad | Wilmington toward Philadelphia |
- Newport Railroad Station
- U.S. National Register of Historic Places
- Location within Delaware Location within the United States
- Location: 112 S. James St., Newport, Delaware
- Coordinates: 39.71211°N 75.60899°W
- Area: less than one acre
- Architectural style: Bungalow/craftsman
- NRHP reference No.: 93001515
- Added to NRHP: January 21, 1994
Location

Newport Railroad Station was a historic railway station located at Newport in New Castle County, Delaware. It was built about 1908 and was a 44.33 foot (13.51 m) long, one-story frame building in the Bungalow / American Craftsman style. It had a large overhanging hipped roof with exposed rafter ends. It was built by the Philadelphia, Wilmington and Baltimore Railroad and closed in the late 1940s. It was demolished between 1995 and 2002.

It was added to the National Register of Historic Places in 1994. A transportation study considered the location for a new commuter rail station along SEPTA Regional Rail's Wilmington/Newark Line during the mid-1990s.
