= Hotel Norton =

Historic hotel in Norton, Virginia, US

- U.S. National Register of Historic Places
- Virginia Landmarks Register
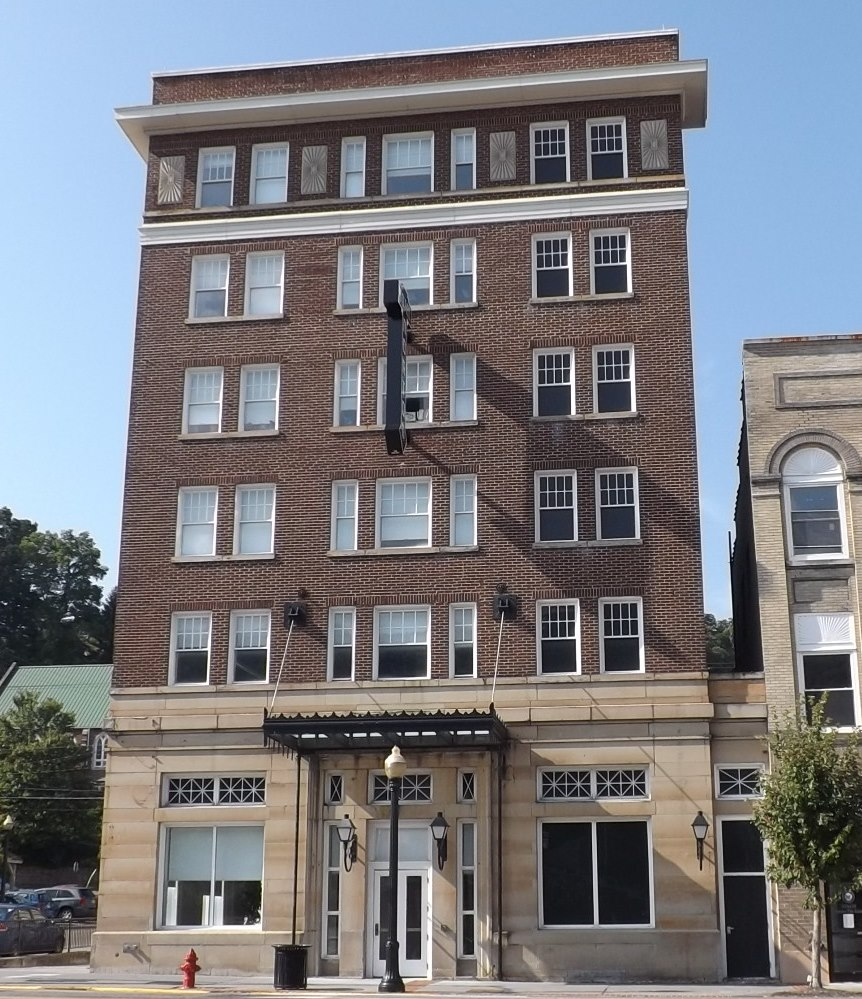
- Hotel Norton, September 2013

- Location within Virginia Location within the United States
- Location: 798 Park Ave., Norton, Virginia
- Coordinates: 36°56′2″N 82°37′53″W
- Area: less than one acre
- Built: 1921
- Architect: Brown, Thomas Seabrook
- Architectural style: Colonial Revival
- NRHP reference No.: 02000524
- VLR No.: 146-0005

Significant dates
- Added to NRHP: May 16, 2002
- Designated VLR: December 5, 2001

Hotel Norton is a historic hotel building located in Norton, Virginia. It was built in 1921, and is a six-story Colonial Revival style building consisting of a cut sandstone base, brick middle, and a deep stone and wood entablature. The interior features a two-story lobby with a decorative mezzanine level balcony. The hotel was abandoned in the 1970s and 1980s and subsequently acquired by the City of Norton for redevelopment.

It was listed on the National Register of Historic Places in 2002.
