= Norton, Virginia =

Independent city in Virginia, United States

- Independent city
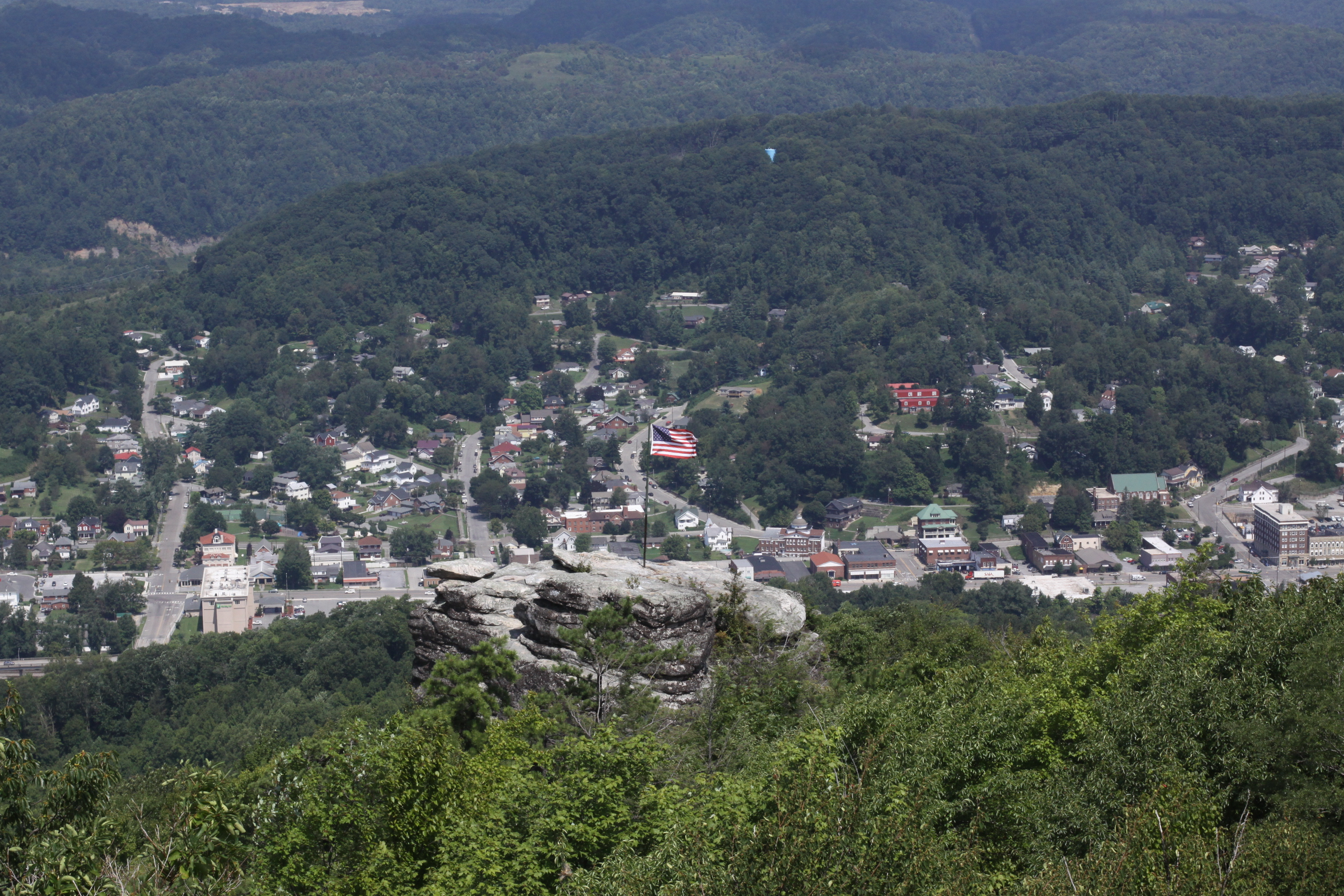
- A view overlooking Norton, Virginia at Flag Rock

- Seal

- Location in the Commonwealth of Virginia
- Coordinates: 36°56′12″N 82°37′30″W
- Country: United States
- State: Virginia
- County: None (Independent city)
- Founded: 1894
- Named for: Eckstein Norton

Government
  - Mayor: Joseph Fawbush

Area
  - Total: 7.51 sq mi (19.46 km^{2})
  - Land: 7.48 sq mi (19.37 km^{2})
  - Water: 0.035 sq mi (0.09 km^{2})
- Elevation: 2,130 ft (650 m)

Population (2020)
  - Total: 3,687
  - Estimate (2025): 3,477 ▼
  - Density: 493.0/sq mi (190.3/km^{2})
- Time zone: UTC−5 (EST)
  - Summer (DST): UTC−4 (EDT)
- ZIP code: 24273
- Area code: 276
- FIPS code: 51-57688
- GNIS feature ID: 1485924
- Website: https://www.nortonva.gov

Norton is an independent city in the Commonwealth of Virginia, located in the far western tip of the state and surrounded by Wise County, Virginia. As of the 2020 census, the population was 3,687, making it the least populous city in Virginia. The Bureau of Economic Analysis combines the city of Norton with surrounding Wise County for statistical purposes.

== History ==
The settlement was originally known as "Prince's Flats," but in a bid to convince the Louisville and Nashville Railroad to build a depot there, the town was renamed after the then-current head of the railroad, Eckstein Norton. Norton was located on the Wilderness Trail, which had been blazed by Daniel Boone, and later extensively mapped and settled by Christopher Gist. The settlement developed as a central hub for the timber trade until the coal boom of the 1830-40s.

The Hotel Norton is listed on the National Register of Historic Places.

== Geography ==
Norton is located along the Powell and Guest Rivers. The entire area of Norton lies within the confines of Wise County but is not a part of the county.

According to the United States Census Bureau, the city has a total area of 7.5 square miles (19 km^{2}), virtually all of which is land.

=== Major highways ===
- US 23
- US 58 Alt.

== Demographics ==
Historical population
Census	Pop.	Note	%±
1900	654		—
1910	1,866		185.3%
1920	3,068		64.4%
1930	3,077		0.3%
1940	4,006		30.2%
1950	4,315		7.7%
1960	4,996		15.8%
1970	4,001		−19.9%
1980	4,757		18.9%
1990	4,247		−10.7%
2000	3,904		−8.1%
2010	3,958		1.4%
2020	3,687		−6.8%
2025 (est.)	3,477	▼	−5.7%
U.S. Decennial Census; 1790–1960 1900–1990; 1990–2000 2010 2020

=== Racial and ethnic composition ===
Norton city, Virginia – Racial and ethnic composition Note: the US Census treats Hispanic/Latino as an ethnic category. This table excludes Latinos from the racial categories and assigns them to a separate category. Hispanics/Latinos may be of any race.
Race / Ethnicity (NH = Non-Hispanic)	Pop 1980	Pop 1990	Pop 2000	Pop 2010	Pop 2020	% 1980	% 1990	% 2000	% 2010	% 2020
White alone (NH)	4,436	3,900	3,548	3,478	3,223	93.25%	91.83%	90.88%	87.87%	87.42%
Black or African American alone (NH)	249	268	235	250	179	5.23%	6.31%	6.02%	6.32%	4.85%
Native American or Alaska Native alone (NH)	1	13	3	5	4	0.02%	0.31%	0.08%	0.13%	0.11%
Asian alone (NH)	25	35	39	56	27	0.53%	0.82%	1.00%	1.41%	0.73%
Native Hawaiian or Pacific Islander alone (NH)	x	x	4	0	0	x	x	0.10%	0.00%	0.00%
Other race alone (NH)	9	0	7	6	14	0.19%	0.00%	0.18%	0.15%	0.38%
Mixed race or Multiracial (NH)	x	x	34	95	159	x	x	0.87%	2.40%	4.31%
Hispanic or Latino (any race)	37	31	34	68	81	0.78%	0.73%	0.87%	1.72%	2.20%
Total	4,757	4,247	3,904	3,958	3,687	100.00%	100.00%	100.00%	100.00%	100.00%

=== 2020 census ===
As of the 2020 census, Norton had a population of 3,687; the median age was 40.7 years, 21.5% of residents were under the age of 18, and 18.7% were 65 years of age or older. For every 100 females there were 86.4 males, and for every 100 females aged 18 and over there were 84.7 males age 18 and over.

As of the 2020 census, 90.1% of residents lived in urban areas, while 9.9% lived in rural areas.

As of the 2020 census, there were 1,678 households in Norton, of which 28.4% had children under the age of 18 living in them. Of all households, 35.7% were married-couple households, 20.3% were households with a male householder and no spouse or partner present, and 36.7% were households with a female householder and no spouse or partner present. About 39.1% of all households were made up of individuals and 16.5% had someone living alone who was 65 years of age or older.

As of the 2020 census, there were 1,934 housing units, of which 13.2% were vacant. The homeowner vacancy rate was 3.8% and the rental vacancy rate was 8.0%.

Racial composition as of the 2020 census
Race	Number	Percent
White	3,242	87.9%
Black or African American	180	4.9%
American Indian and Alaska Native	8	0.2%
Asian	27	0.7%
Native Hawaiian and Other Pacific Islander	1	0.0%
Some other race	38	1.0%
Two or more races	191	5.2%
Hispanic or Latino (of any race)	81	2.2%

=== 2000 census ===
As of the census of 2000, there were 3,904 people, 1,730 households, and 1,067 families residing in the city. The population density was 518.5 people per square mile (200.2 people/km^{2}). There were 1,946 housing units at an average density of 258.4 units per square mile (99.8 units/km^{2}). The racial makeup of the city was 91.57% White, 6.15% Black, 0.08% Native American, 1.00% Asian, 0.13% Pacific Islander, 0.18% from other races, and 0.90% from two or more races. Hispanic or Latino of any race were 0.87% of the population.

There were 1,730 households, out of which 26.1% had children under the age of 18 living with them, 43.0% were married couples living together, 15.7% had a female householder with no husband present, and 38.3% were non-families. 34.9% of all households were made up of individuals, and 14.3% had someone living alone who was 65 years of age or older. The average household size was 2.23 and the average family size was 2.88.

In the city, the population was spread out, with 21.8% under the age of 18, 10.2% from 18 to 24, 27.3% from 25 to 44, 25.4% from 45 to 64, and 15.3% who were 65 years of age or older. The median age was 39 years. For every 100 females, there were 81.8 males. For every 100 females aged 18 and over, there were 78.5 males.

The median income for a household in the city was $22,788, and the median income for a family was $30,889. Males had a median income of $30,000 versus $23,229 for females. The per capita income for the city was $16,024. About 19.1% of families and 22.8% of the population were below the poverty line, including 35.7% of those under age 18 and 12.1% of those age 65 or over.

== Government ==
United States presidential election results for Norton, Virginia
Year	Republican		Democratic		Third party(ies)	
Year	No.	%	No.	%	No.	%
1956	684	55.12%	552	44.48%	5	0.40%
1960	549	51.02%	526	48.88%	1	0.09%
1964	372	31.10%	824	68.90%	0	0.00%
1968	495	39.07%	555	43.80%	217	17.13%
1972	823	62.68%	463	35.26%	27	2.06%
1976	577	40.35%	811	56.71%	42	2.94%
1980	572	40.86%	762	54.43%	66	4.71%
1984	806	48.32%	842	50.48%	20	1.20%
1988	608	42.73%	795	55.87%	20	1.41%
1992	472	30.49%	871	56.27%	205	13.24%
1996	416	30.10%	802	58.03%	164	11.87%
2000	639	41.76%	867	56.67%	24	1.57%
2004	768	51.06%	725	48.20%	11	0.73%
2008	744	49.21%	743	49.14%	25	1.65%
2012	895	59.99%	566	37.94%	31	2.08%
2016	1,021	69.93%	383	26.23%	56	3.84%
2020	1,109	69.27%	464	28.98%	28	1.75%
2024	1,174	71.41%	458	27.86%	12	0.73%

The city of Norton is located in the 9th congressional district, currently served by Morgan Griffith. For state government, Norton lies in the 1st House district (Terry Kilgore) and the 38th Senate district (Travis Hackworth, previously Ben Chafin, who died from COVID-19 complications).

Since 2004, Norton has reliably voted for the Republican candidate for president. Although John McCain beat Barack Obama in Norton by just a single vote in 2008, the Republican margins increased thereafter, reaching forty percent margins beginning in 2016.

In 2021, Norton voted for Glenn Youngkin over Terry McAuliffe at a greater than forty-five percent margin.

== Education ==
Norton City Schools is the school division of the city, operating John I. Burton High School and Norton Elementary and Middle School.

== Notable people ==
- Dock Boggs – musician and songwriter
- James L. Camblos (1888–1970) – mayor of Norton, state delegate
- Vernon Crawford "Jack" Cooke – bluegrass musician
- Jacob Cress – furniture maker
