= Newport Masonic Hall =

Historic building in Delaware, US

- Armstrong Lodge No. 26, A. F. & A. M.
- U.S. National Register of Historic Places
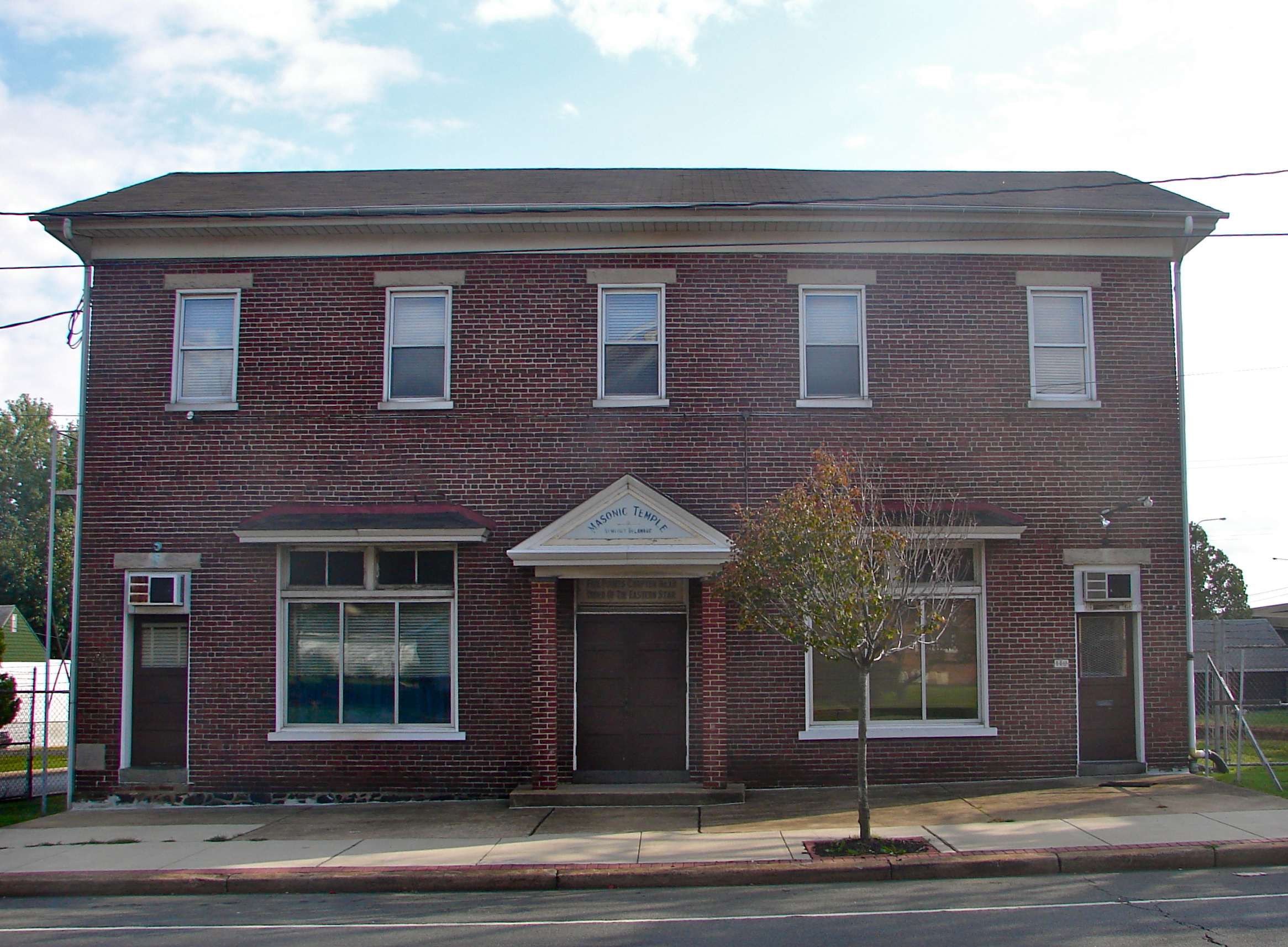
- Armstrong Lodge No. 26, A. F. & A. M., October 2011

- Location within Delaware Location within the United States
- Location: 112-114 E. Market St., Newport, Delaware
- Coordinates: 39°42′49″N 75°36′28″W
- Area: less than one acre
- Built: 1913
- Architect: Campbell, Fred R.; Thompson and Campbell
- Architectural style: Colonial Revival
- MPS: Newport Delaware MPS
- NRHP reference No.: 93000628
- Added to NRHP: July 14, 1993

Newport Masonic Hall is historic building located at Newport, Delaware, United States. Listed on the National Register of Historic Places as Armstrong Lodge No. 26, A. F. & A. M., it was built in 1913, and consists of a two-story, five-bay, rectangular brick main block with a long, one-story rectangular rear wing to form a 'T'-plan. A large, arch-roofed brick addition was built in 1958. The building is in a restrained Colonial Revival style. The main block has a gable roof. It was designed with two commercial spaces on the ground floor, and a lodge room and auditorium on the second.

The building was added to the National Register of Historic Places in 1993.
