= Killgore Hall =

- U.S. National Register of Historic Places
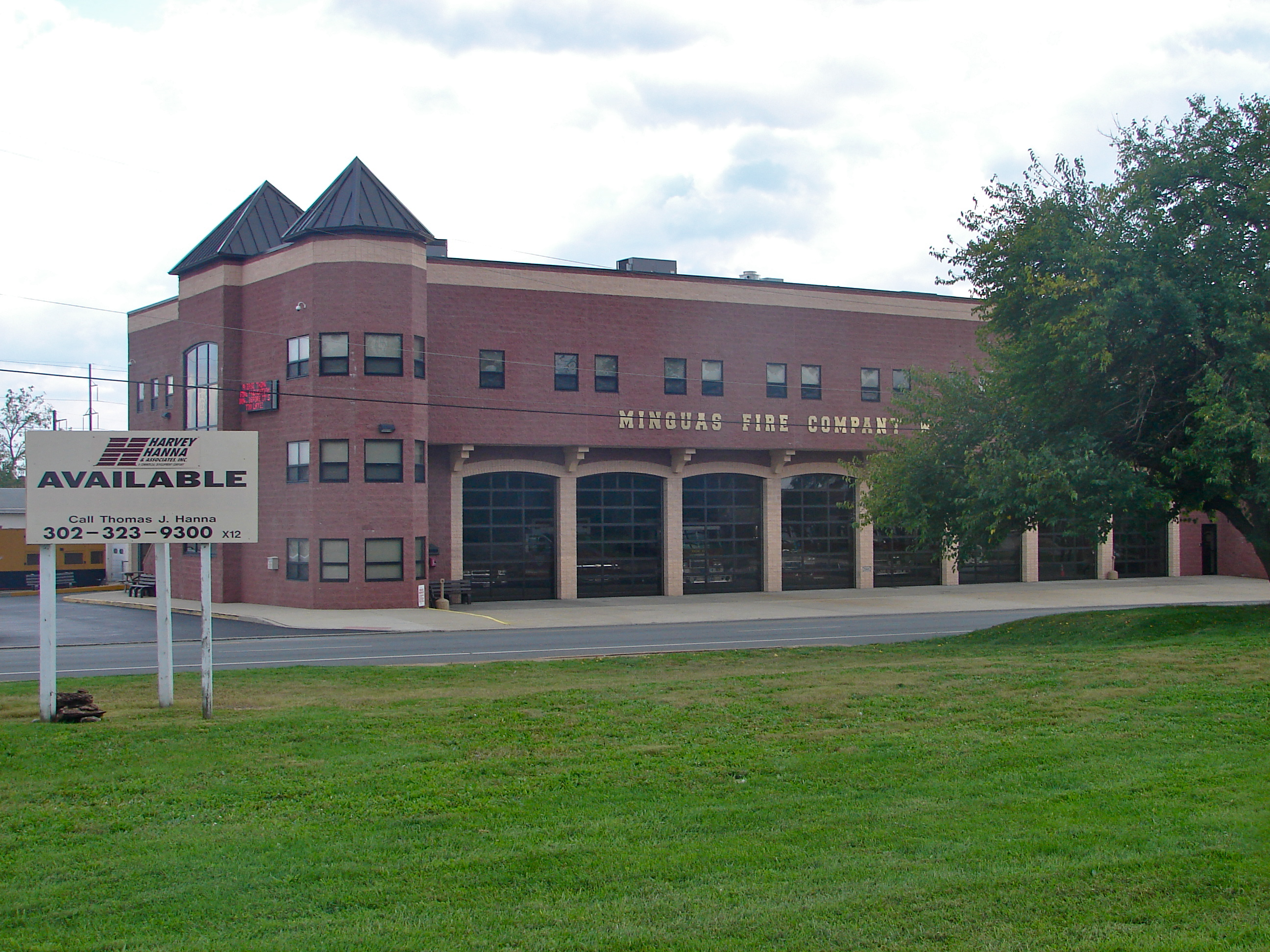
- Site of the former Joseph Killgore House, October 2011

- Location within Delaware Location within the United States
- Location: 101 N. James St., Newport, Delaware
- Coordinates: 39.714812°N 75.609967°W
- Area: less than one acre
- Built: 1883
- Architectural style: Colonial Revival
- MPS: Newport Delaware MPS
- NRHP reference No.: 93000630
- Added to NRHP: July 14, 1993

Killgore Hall, also known as Wroten's Hardware, was a historic commercial building located at Newport, New Castle County, Delaware. It was built in 1883, and was a three-story, three bay by six bay, brick building with a flat roof and overhanging cornice. It has a one-story, one bay extension. A three-story porch spanned the east facade, with Colonial Revival columns and square balusters. It was located next to the Joseph Killgore House. The building was demolished about 2000.

It was added to the National Register of Historic Places in 1993.
