= Joseph Killgore House =

Historic house in Delaware, United States

- U.S. National Register of Historic Places
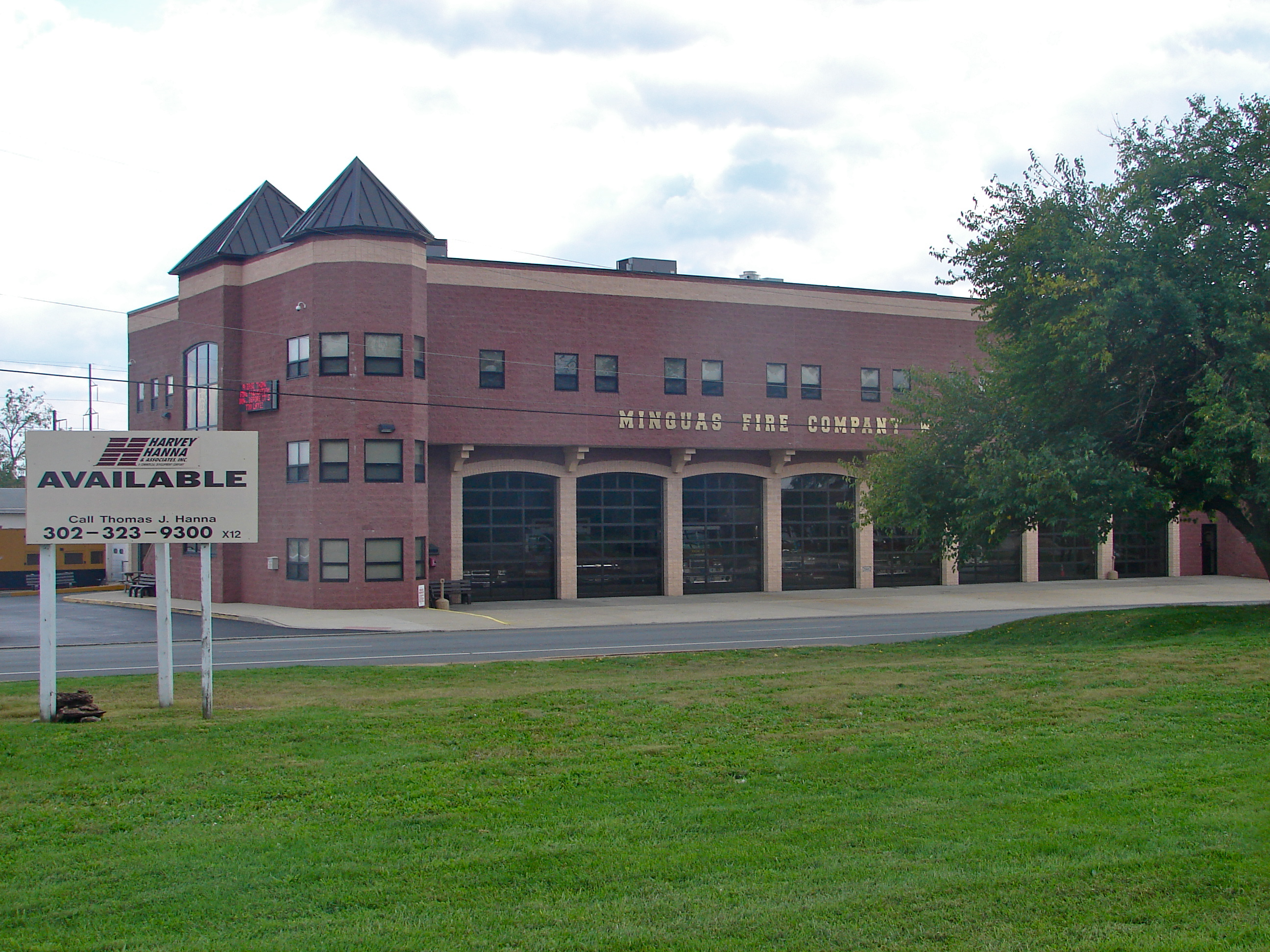
- Site of the former Joseph Killgore House, October 2011

- Location within Delaware Location within the United States
- Location: 107 N. James St., Newport, Delaware
- Coordinates: 39.714985°N 75.609996°W
- Area: less than one acre
- Architectural style: Vernacular, hall-parlor
- MPS: Newport Delaware MPS
- NRHP reference No.: 93000627
- Added to NRHP: July 14, 1993

Joseph Killgore House was a historic home located at Newport, New Castle County, Delaware. It was built in the second quarter of the 19th century and was a two-story, three-bay, frame dwelling with a gable roof in the saltbox style. It began as a 1 1/2-story, hall-parlor plan dwelling and later expanded. It was located next to the Killgore Hall commercial development. The house was demolished in about 2000.

It was added to the National Register of Historic Places in 1993.
