= Lithopone =

Mixture of inorganic compounds, widely used as a white pigment powder

Names
- Other names Barium zinc sulfate sulfide, Enamel White, Pigment white 5, CI Pigment white 5, Barium zinc sulfate, Barium zinc sulfide, Lithopone B301, ZNS 28-30%, Lithopone 28-30%, LithoponeB311, Zinc sulfide, Barium sulfate Mixture, Pigment White 5 (77115), Becton White, Charlton White, Zincolith

Identifiers
CAS Number	1345-05-7
ChemSpider	27472957
ECHA InfoCard	100.014.286
EC Number	215-715-5
PubChem CID	56846444
UNII	BU2HVV8RW9
CompTox Dashboard (EPA)	DTXSID40892168

Properties
Chemical formula	BaSO_{4}·ZnS
Molar mass	330.80 g/mol
Appearance	White powder
Odor	odorless
Density	Approx. 4.36 g/mL
Melting point	ZnS > 1,180 °C BaSO4 > 1,350 °C
Solubility in water	Insoluble

Hazards
- GHS labelling
Pictograms	(GHS07: Exclamation mark)
Signal word	Warning
Hazard statements	H302, H332
Precautionary statements	P261, P264, P270, P271, P301+P312, P304+P312, P304+P340, P312, P330, P501
NFPA 704 (fire diamond)	1 0 1
- Except where otherwise noted, data are given for materials in their standard state (at 25 °C [77 °F], 100 kPa). Infobox references

Lithopone, C.I. Pigment White 5, is a mixture of inorganic compounds, widely used as a white pigment powder. It is composed of a mixture of barium sulfate and zinc sulfide. These insoluble compounds blend well with organic compounds and confer opacity. It was made popular by the cheap production costs, greater coverage. Related white pigments include titanium dioxide, zinc oxide ("zinc white"), zinc sulfide, and white lead.

== History ==
Lithopone was discovered in the 1870s by DuPont. It was manufactured by Krebs Pigments and Chemical Company and other companies. The material came in different "seals", which varied in the content of zinc sulfide. Gold seal and Bronze seals contain 40-50% zinc sulfide, offering more hiding power and strength. Although its popularity peaked around 1920, approximately 223,352 tons were produced in 1990. It is mainly used in paints, putty, and in plastics.

=== Stability and darkening ===
Although barium sulfate is almost completely inert, zinc sulfide degrades upon exposure to UV light, leading to darkening of the pigment. The severity of this UV reaction is dependent on a combination of two factors; how much zinc sulfide makes up the pigments formulation, and its total accumulated UV exposure. Depending on these factors the pigment itself can vary in shade over time, ranging from pure white all the way to grey or even black. To suppress this effect, a dopant may be used, such as a small amount of cobalt salts, which would be added to the formulation. This process creates cobalt-doped zinc sulfide. The cobalt salts help to stabilize zinc sulfide so it will not have as severe a reaction to UV exposure.

== Production ==
Lithopone is produced by coprecipitation of barium sulfate and zinc sulfide. Most commonly coprecipitation is effected by combining equimolar amounts of zinc sulfate and barium sulfide:

BaS + ZnSO_{4} → ZnS·BaSO_{4}

This route affords a product that is 29.4 wt % ZnS and 70.6 wt % BaSO_{4}. Variations exist, for example, more ZnS-rich materials are produced when zinc chloride is added to the mixture of zinc sulfate and barium sulfide.

Barium sulfide is produced by carbothermic reduction of barium sulfate. Zinc sulfate is obtained from a variety of zinc products, often waste, by treatment with sulfuric acid.

== Safety ==
Lithopone is rather nontoxic, due to the compound's extreme insolubility. It has been used in medicine as a radiocontrast agent. Lithopone is allowed to be in contact with foodstuffs in the US and Europe.

== See also ==
- List of inorganic pigments

== Historical references ==
- Ralston, O.C. (1921). Electrolytic Deposition and Hydrometallurgy of Zinc. New York: McGraw Hill..
- O'Brien, W.J. (1915). "The Study of Lithopone". J. Phys. Chem. 19 (2): 113–144. doi:10.1021/j150155a002..
- US 1478347, Mitchell John L, "Apparatus for calcining lithopone", published Dec 18, 1923, assigned to Mitchell John L
- Goshorn, J.H.; Black, C.K. (1929). "The study of lithopone darkening". Industrial and Engineering Chemistry. 21 (4): 348–9. doi:10.1021/ie50232a021.
- Sachtleben. "Material Safety Data Sheet" (PDF)..
- Trott, L.H. (1927). Lithopone and Its Part in Paints. The New Jersey Zinc Company..
