= Reel East Texas Film Festival =

Film festival in Kilgore, Texas

- Location: Texan Theater, Downtown, Kilgore, Texas
- Founded: 2017
- Awards: Best Feature Film; Best Short Film; Audience Choice Award
- Website: reeleasttexas.com

The Reel East Texas Film Festival (RETFF) is an annual film event held at the Texan Theater in downtown Kilgore, Texas. Established in 2017, the festival focuses on independent films and offers competitive awards across multiple categories.

== History ==
Chip Hale founded the Reel East Texas Film Festival which debuted in 2017 at the Texan Theater in the downtown. The theater, an Art Moderne venue built in 1931, was restored in 2016 to host cultural events. In 2022 they added a horror film block curated by Texas filmmaker Don Thacker, featuring shorts like East Texas Hot Links. In September 2023 it received over 300 submissions from 28 countries, including Robin Givens' feature Nanna. By October 2023, the festival screened over 100 films annually, with nearly half being student projects. In 2024, the city of Kilgore was designated a "Film Friendly City" by the Texas Film Commission.

== Awards ==
Category	2023 Winner	Country
Best Short	A Kind of Testament	France
Audience Choice	East Texas Hot Links	USA
