= Krebs Pigments and Chemical Company =

Defunct manufacturer of lithopone and titanium dioxide

- Founded: 1902

Krebs Pigments and Chemical Company was founded in 1902 by Henrik J. Krebs and was a manufacturer of lithopone and titanium dioxide. Following Krebs death it would be purchased by DuPont and eventually liquidated simply becoming a part of DuPont.

== History ==
The company was founded in 1902 by Henrik J. Krebs in Newport, Delaware. After the death of Krebs in 1929 the company was purchased by DuPont.

In 1931, DuPont formed a joint venture with Commercial Pigments Corporation to scale up titanium dioxide production for use as a white pigment, to compete against National Lead. The joint venture was named the Krebs Pigment and Color Corporation.

By 1933, National Lead and DuPont ended their patent litigation and cross-licensed their patents and synthetic routes. In 1934, DuPont purchased the Commercial Pigments Corporation's 30 percent stake in the company for $7,420,000. In 1935 Phelps was named the assistant general manager. It then became a wholly-owned subsidiary of DuPont. DuPont then called it the "Krebs Pigments Department" and by 1942 it became just the "Pigments Department". DuPont then liquidated all of Krebs Pigment and Color Corporation's assets and transferred them to the DuPont Company.
