= Terry Kilgore =

American politician

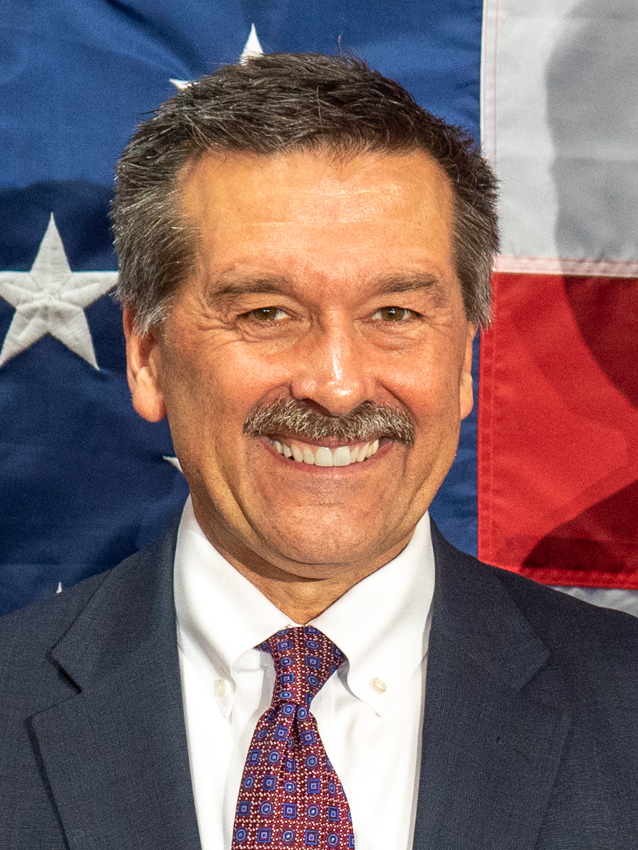
- Kilgore in 2023

Minority Leader of the Virginia House of Delegates
- Incumbent
- Assumed office June 1, 2025
- Preceded by: Todd Gilbert

Majority Leader of the Virginia House of Delegates
- In office January 12, 2022 – January 10, 2024
- Preceded by: Charniele Herring
- Succeeded by: Charniele Herring

Member of the Virginia House of Delegates
- Incumbent
- Assumed office January 12, 1994
- Preceded by: Ford C. Quillen
- Constituency: 1st district (1994–2024); 45th district (2024–present)

Personal details
- Born: Terry Gene Kilgore; August 23, 1961 (age 64) Kingsport, Tennessee, U.S.
- Party: Republican
- Spouse: Debbie Wright
- Relations: Jerry Kilgore (brother)
- Education: Clinch Valley College (BA); College of William and Mary (JD)

Terry Gene Kilgore (born August 23, 1961) is an American attorney and politician. A Republican, he was elected to the Virginia House of Delegates in 1993, and became chair of the Commerce and Labor committee in 2008. He currently represents the 45th district in the far southwestern corner of the state, near Cumberland Gap.

== Early life and education ==
Kilgore graduated with a B.A. from the University of Virginia's College at Wise, previously named Clinch Valley College, and a J.D. from the College of William & Mary's School of Law.

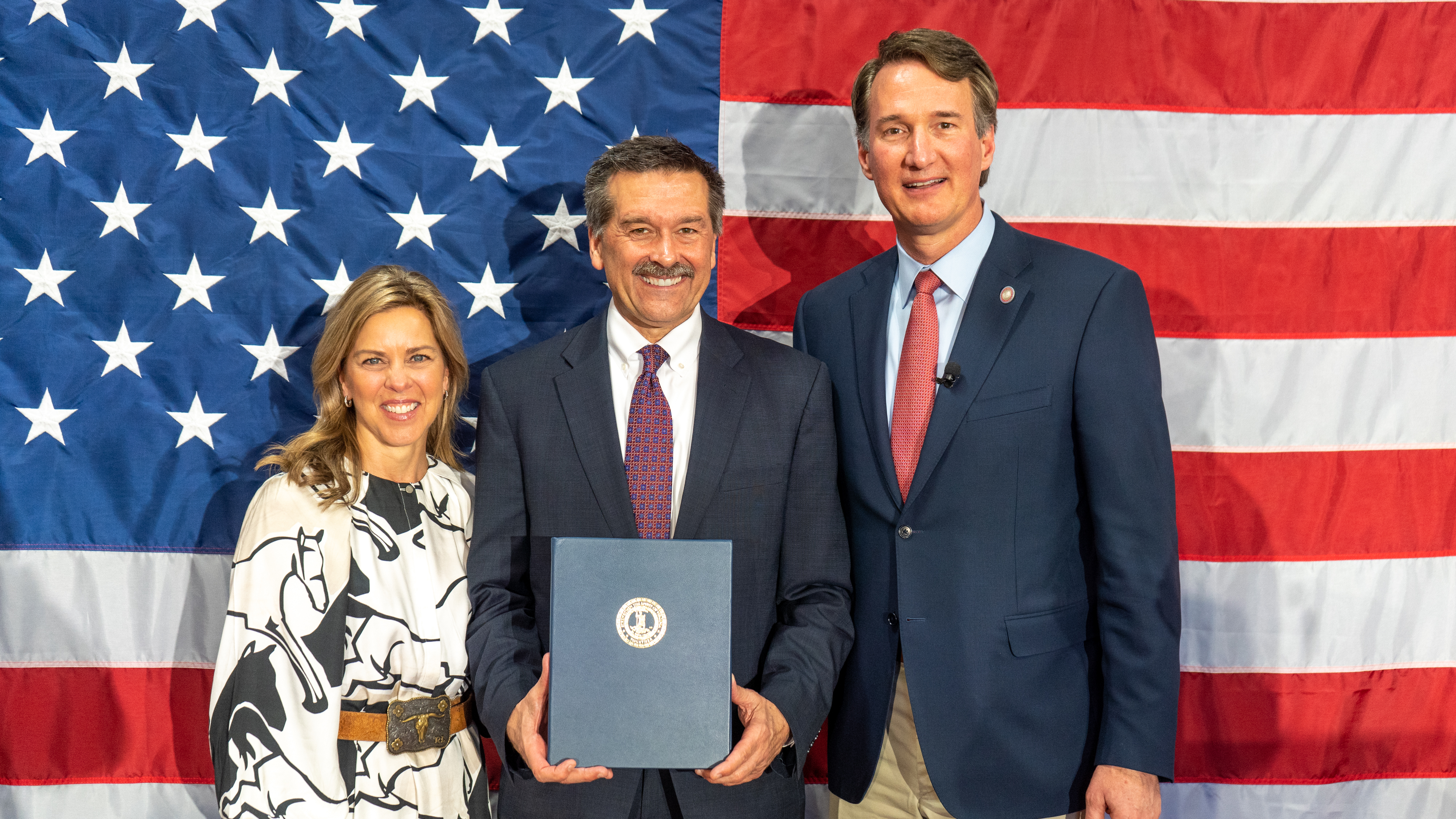
Kilgore with Governor Glenn Youngkin and First Lady Suzanne Youngkin

== Political career ==
Following the 2019 elections in which Republicans lost their majority in the Virginia House of Delegates, Kilgore sought the minority leader position. Republicans regained control of the House of Delegates in 2021.

Kilgore was elected as minority leader in June 2025.

== Personal life ==
Kilgore's twin brother, Jerry, was Attorney General of Virginia 2002–2005, and was the unsuccessful Republican candidate for Governor of Virginia in 2005, losing to Tim Kaine. Kilgore's mother, Willie Mae Kilgore, was the registrar of voters in Kilgore's home jurisdiction, Scott County, until December 2008. He has two children.

== Electoral history ==
Date	Election	Candidate	Party	Votes	%
Virginia House of Delegates, 1st district
Nov 2, 1993	General	Terry G. Kilgore	Republican	10,882	57.13
Nov 2, 1993	General	George F. Cridlin	Democratic	8,162	42.85
Nov 2, 1993	General	Write Ins		3	0.02
Nov 2, 1993	General	Ford C. Quillen retired; seat switched from Democratic to Republican			
Nov 7, 1995	General	Terry G. Kilgore	Republican	13,909	99.91
Nov 7, 1995	General	Write Ins		12	0.09
Nov 4, 1997	General	Terry G. Kilgore	Republican	12,130	72.06
Nov 4, 1997	General	Jerry D. Taylor	Democratic	4,703	27.94
Nov 2, 1999	General	Terry G. Kilgore	Republican	13,983	99.91
Nov 2, 1999	General	Write Ins		13	0.09
Nov 6, 2001	General	Terry G. Kilgore	Republican	12,777	99.87
Nov 6, 2001	General	Write Ins		16	0.13
Nov 4, 2003	General	Terry G. Kilgore	Republican	14,279	99.91
Nov 4, 2003	General	Write Ins		13	0.09
Nov 8, 2005	General	Terry G. Kilgore	Republican	14,194	68.74
Nov 8, 2005	General	Rex E. McCarty	Democratic	6,445	31.21
Nov 8, 2005	General	Write Ins		9	0.04
Nov 6, 2007	General	Terry G. Kilgore	Republican	14,374	72.30
Nov 6, 2007	General	Jerry D. Taylor	Democratic	5,491	27.62
Nov 6, 2007	General	Write Ins		14	0.07
Nov 3, 2009	General	Terry G. Kilgore	Republican	13,098	98.92
Nov 3, 2009	General	Write Ins		142	1.07
Nov 8, 2011	General	Terry G. Kilgore	Republican	16,465	98.64
Nov 8, 2011	General	Write Ins		226	1.35
Nov 5, 2013	General	Terry G. Kilgore	Republican	14,330	98.3
Nov 5, 2013	General	Write Ins		253	1.7
Nov 3, 2015	General	Terry G. Kilgore	Republican	16,716	98.4
Nov 3, 2015	General	Write Ins		271	1.6
Nov 7, 2017	General	Terry G. Kilgore	Republican	14,848	76
Nov 7, 2017	General	Alicia D. Kallen	Democratic	4,639	23.8
Nov 7, 2017	General	Write Ins		42	0.2
Nov 5, 2019	General	Terry G. Kilgore	Republican	16,747	96.41
Nov 5, 2019	General	Write Ins		623	3.59
Nov 2, 2021	General	Terry G. Kilgore	Republican	21,910	97.3
Nov 2, 2021	General	Write Ins		602	2.7
Virginia House of Delegates, 45th district
Nov 7, 2023	General	Terry G. Kilgore	Republican	14,815	97.7
Nov 7, 2023	General	Write Ins		353	2.3

== Notes ==
Virginia House of Delegates
Preceded by Charniele Herring	Majority Leader of the Virginia House of Delegates; 2022–2024	Succeeded by Charniele Herring
Preceded by Todd Gilbert	Minority Leader of the Virginia House of Delegates; 2025–present	Incumbent
