= Virginia's 1st House of Delegates district =

Virginia legislative district

Virginia's 1st State House of Delegates district
- District map from the 2023 election
Delegate
Patrick Hope; D–Arlington
- Demographics: 69% White; 4% Black; 11% Hispanic; 9% Asian; 0% Native American; 0% Hawaiian/Pacific Islander; 0% Other; 6% Multiracial
- Population (2023) • Voting age: 85,428; 18
- Registered voters (2025): 69,097

Virginia's 1st House of Delegates district is one of 100 seats in the Virginia House of Delegates, the lower house of the state's bicameral legislature. District 1 represents part of Arlington County. The seat is held by Democrat Patrick Hope. Hope was first elected in 2009.

== Elections ==
=== 2017 ===
In the November 2017 election, Democrat Alicia Kallen ran against Kilgore. It was the first time in a decade Kilgore had a challenger for the seat. Kallen, 26, works at Norton Community Hospital. However, she was unable to win the seat and Kilgore kept his position.

=== 2021 ===
Due to the 2021 Redistricting, House of Delegates District 1 has been moved to Northern Virginia, encompassing part of Arlington County.

== District officeholders ==
Years	Delegate	Party	Electoral history
January 12, 1972 – January 12, 1994	Ford C. Quillen	Democratic	Retired
January 12, 1994 – January 10, 2024	Terry Kilgore	Republican	First elected in 1994. Redistricted to the 45th District.
January 10, 2024 – present	Patrick A. Hope	Democrat	Redistricted from the 47th District

== Electoral history ==
Date	Election	Candidate	Party	Votes	%
Virginia House of Delegates, 1st district
Nov 2, 1993	General	Terry Gene Kilgore	Republican	10,882	57.13
Nov 2, 1993	General	George F Cridlin	Democratic	8,162	42.85
Nov 2, 1993	General	Write Ins		3	0.02
Nov 2, 1993	General	Ford C. Quillen retired; seat switched from Democratic to Republican			
Nov 7, 1995	General	Terry G. Kilgore	Republican	13,909	99.91
Nov 7, 1995	General	Write Ins		12	0.09
Nov 4, 1997	General	Terry G. Kilgore	Republican	12,130	72.06
Nov 4, 1997	General	Jerry D. Taylor	Democratic	4,703	27.94
Nov 2, 1999	General	T G Kilgore	Republican	13,983	99.91
Nov 2, 1999	General	Write Ins		13	0.09
Nov 6, 2001	General	T G Kilgore	Republican	12,777	99.87
Nov 6, 2001	General	Write Ins		16	0.13
Nov 4, 2003	General	T G Kilgore	Republican	14,279	99.91
Nov 4, 2003	General	Write Ins		13	0.09
Nov 8, 2005	General	T G Kilgore	Republican	14,194	68.74
Nov 8, 2005	General	R E Mccarty	Democratic	6,445	31.21
Nov 8, 2005	General	Write Ins		9	0.04
Nov 6, 2007	General	Terry G. Kilgore	Republican	14,374	72.30
Nov 6, 2007	General	Jerry D. Taylor	Democratic	5,491	27.62
Nov 6, 2007	General	Write Ins		14	0.07
Nov 3, 2009	General	Terry G. Kilgore	Republican	13,098	98.92
Nov 3, 2009	General	Write Ins		142	1.07
Nov 8, 2011	General	Terry G. Kilgore	Republican	16,465	98.64
Nov 8, 2011	General	Write Ins		226	1.35
Nov 5, 2013	General	Terry G. Kilgore	Republican	14,330	98.3
Nov 5, 2013	General	Write Ins		253	1.7
Nov 3, 2015	General	Terry G. Kilgore	Republican	16,716	98.4
Nov 3, 2015	General	Write Ins		271	1.6
Nov 7, 2017	General	Terry G. Kilgore	Republican	14,848	76.0
Nov 7, 2017	General	Alicia D. Kallen	Democratic	4,639	23.8
Nov 7, 2017	General	Write Ins		42	0.2
Nov 5, 2019	General	Terry G. Kilgore	Republican	16,748	95.7
Nov 5, 2019	General	Write Ins		754	4.3
Nov 2, 2021	General	Terry G. Kilgore	Republican	21,910	97.3
Nov 2, 2021	General	Write Ins		602	2.7
Nov 7, 2023	General	Patrick A. Hope	Democrat	24,483	95.5
Nov 7, 2023	General	Write Ins		1,142	4.5
