= List of blacksmith shops =

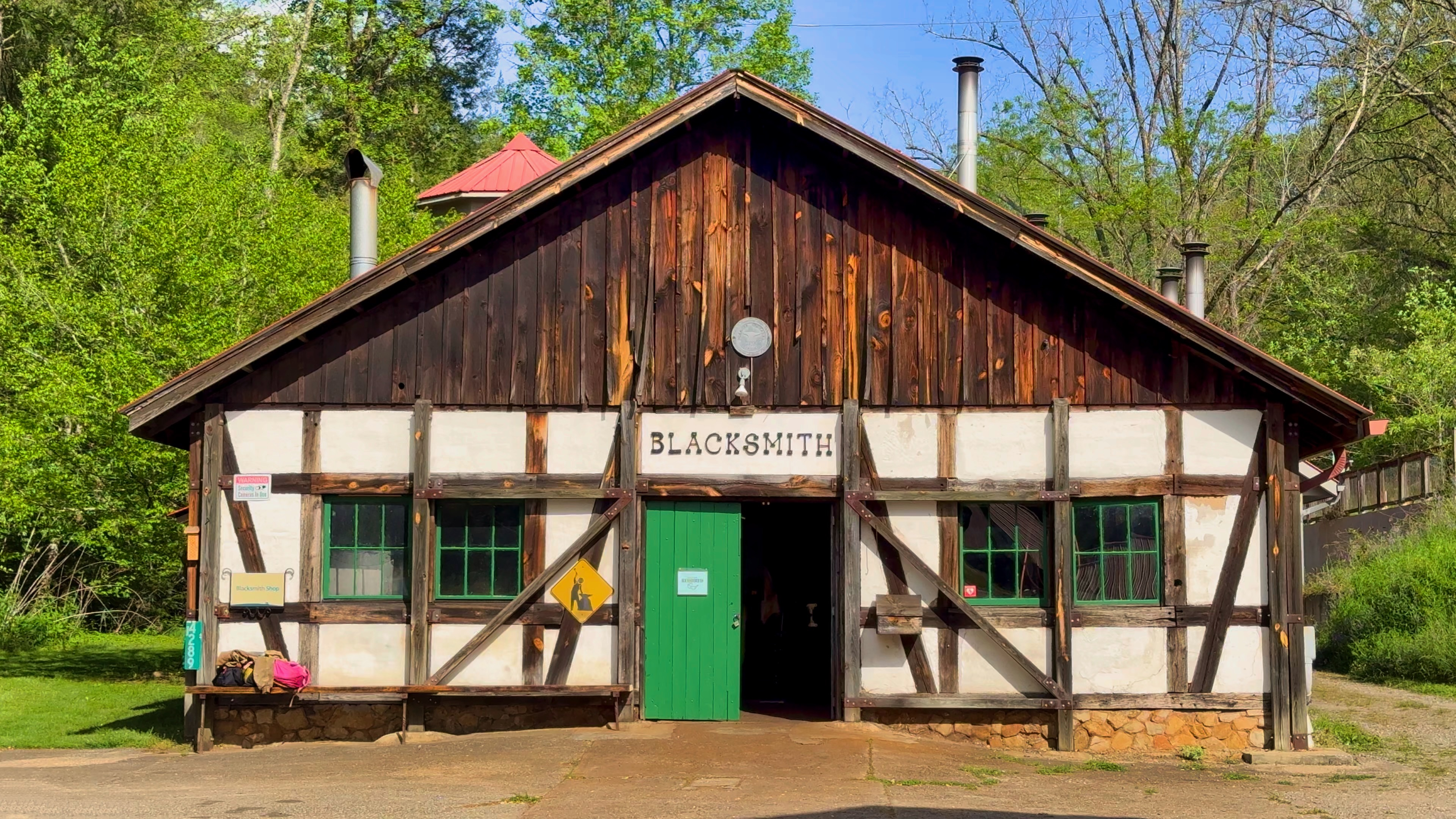
The Francis Whitaker Blacksmith Shop at the John C. Campbell Folk School

This is a list of blacksmith shops. This is intended to include any notable current ones operating as businesses, as well as historic ones that are operational or not. It includes numerous ones in open-air museums. Some of the historic blacksmith shops are contributing buildings in historic districts.

== Australia ==
- Deasland, Ginninderra, Canberra
- Historic Village Herberton, Herberton, Queensland
- Coppabella Blacksmith Shop, Rosewood, Greater Hume Shire, New South Wales
- Honeysuckle Point Railway Workshops, Newcastle, New South Wales
- Warrawagine, Pilbara region, Western Australia

== Canada ==
- South Peace Centennial Museum, open-air museum, Beaverlodge, Alberta
- Pioneer Acres Museum, museum north of Irricana, Alberta
- Kings Landing Historical Settlement, New Brunswick
- Upper Canada Village, near Morrisburg, Ontario
- Lang Pioneer Village Museum, Peterborough County, Ontario
- Black Creek Pioneer Village, Toronto, Ontario
- Mossbank, Saskatchewan

== United Kingdom ==
- Tooley's Boatyard, Banbury, Oxfordshire, England
- Wayside Folk Museum, Zennor, west Cornwall, England
- Beck Isle Museum, Pickering, North Yorkshire, England.
- Ryhope Engines Museum, Sunderland, Tyne and Wear, England
- Bishops Lydeard Mill and Rural Life Museum, Bishops Lydeard, Somerset, England
- Burwell Museum, Burwell, Cambridgeshire, England
- Gretna Green, Dumfries and Galloway, Scotland

== United States ==
Alabama

- Preuit Oaks, Colbert County, Alabama, NRHP-listed

Arizona

- Sahuaro Ranch, north of Glendale, Arizona
- Pioneer Living History Museum, museum, Phoenix, Arizona

Arkansas

- Jacob Wolf House, Norfork, Arkansas

California

- Irvine Blacksmith Shop, Irvine, CA, NRHP-listed
- Old Borges Ranch, Contra Costa County, California
- Old Town San Diego State Historic Park, San Diego, California
- Great Sierra Mine Historic Site, Yosemite National Park, California

Colorado

- Bimson Blacksmith Shop, Berthoud, Colorado, NRHP-listed
- Rock Ledge Ranch Historic Site, open-air museum, Colorado Springs, Colorado
- Romeo Block, Denver, Colorado
- Wiley Rock Schoolhouse, 603 Main St., Wiley, Colorado, NRHP-listed

Connecticut

- William Gorton Farm, East Lyme, Connecticut
- Griswold House (Guilford, Connecticut)

Delaware

- Hickman Blacksmith Shop and House, Marshallton, Delaware, NRHP-listed

Florida

- Barberville Central High School, Barberville, Florida
- Blacksmith Shop (St. Augustine, Florida)

Georgia

- Central of Georgia Depot and Trainshed, Savannah, Georgia
- Georgia State Railroad Museum, Savannah, Georgia

Illinois

- John Deere House and Shop, Grand Detour, Illinois
- Hicks Locomotive and Car Works, Chicago Heights, Illinois
- Streibich Blacksmith Shop, Newman, IL, NRHP-listed

Iowa

- Quasdorf Blacksmith and Wagon Shop, Dows, IA, NRHP-listed
- Matthew Edel Blacksmith Shop and House, Haverhill, IA, NRHP-listed
- Bigler Building, Clermont, Iowa
- Quasdorf Blacksmith and Wagon Shop (1899), Dows, Iowa, NRHP-listed
- Forest Park Museum and Arboretum, near Perry, Iowa

Kansas

- Blacksmith Creek Bridge, Topeka, KS, NRHP-listed
- Cuba Blacksmith Shop, Cuba, KS, NRHP-listed
- Transue Brothers Blacksmith & Wagon Shop, Summerfield, KS, NRHP-listed
- Holmberg and Johnson Blacksmith Shop, Lindsborg, KS, NRHP-listed
- Holmberg and Johnson Blacksmith Shop, Lindsborg, Kansas

Kentucky

- Joy, Kentucky

Louisiana

- Lafitte's Blacksmith Shop, New Orleans, LA, NRHP-listed
- Kent Plantation House, Alexandria, Rapides Parish, Louisiana
- Oak Alley Plantation, Vacherie, St. James Parish, Louisiana
- Whitney Plantation Historic District, near Wallace, St. John the Baptist Parish, Louisiana
- Plaquemine Historic District, Plaquemine, Louisiana, NRHP-listed

Maine

- Chandler-Parsons Blacksmith Shop, Dover-Foxcroft, ME, NRHP-listed
- Chandler-Parsons Blacksmith Shop, Dover-Foxcroft, Maine
- Larsson–Noak Historic District, New Sweden, Maine
- Stearns Hill Farm, West Paris, Maine

Maryland

- Oakland Mills Blacksmith House and Shop, Columbia, MD, NRHP-listed
- G. Krug & Son Ironworks and Museum, Baltimore, Maryland
- Mount Clare Shops, Baltimore, Maryland
- Stone Hall (Cockeysville, Maryland)
- Oakland Mills Blacksmith House and Shop, Oakland Mills, Maryland, NRHP-listed

Massachusetts

- George I. Briggs House, Bourne, Massachusetts
- Robert Strong Woodward House and Studio, Buckland, Massachusetts, NRHP-listed
- Old Chelmsford Garrison House, Chelmsford, Massachusetts, historic house museum
- Uxbridge Common District, Uxbridge, Massachusetts

Michigan

- Benjamin Blacksmith Shop, Mackinac Island, Michigan
- Calumet and Hecla Industrial District, Michigan
- Arthur Silliman House, Three Rivers, Michigan

Minnesota

- J. A. Johnson Blacksmith Shop, Rothsay, Minnesota
- North Oaks Farm, North Oaks, Minnesota, an open-air museum
- City Blacksmith Shop, Lamberton, MN, NRHP-listed
- J.A. Johnson Blacksmith Shop, Rothsay, MN, NRHP-listed
- Bally Blacksmith Shop, Grand Marais, MN, NRHP-listed

Mississippi

- Ravennaside, Natchez, Mississippi, NRHP-listed

Missouri

- Dr. James Compton House, Kansas City, Missouri

Montana

- Boyd's Shop, Kalispell, Montana
- Gildersleeve Mine, Mineral County, Montana

Nebraska

- Blacksmith Shop, Bellevue, NE, NRHP-listed
- Cook Blacksmith Shop, Ponca, NE, NRHP-listed
- Cook Blacksmith Shop, Ponca, Nebraska
- Crossfire Forge, Ainsworth, Nebraska

New Jersey

- Glanville Blacksmith Shop, Morristown, NJ, NRHP-listed

New Mexico

- Santa Fe Railway Shops (Albuquerque), New Mexico

New York

- Mixter Blacksmith Shop, Warrensburg, NY, NRHP-listed
- Alloway, New York
- Fenimore Farm & Country Village, Cooperstown, New York
- A. Newton Farm, Orleans, New York
- Hildreth-Lord-Hawley Farm, Pittsford, New York
- Old Stone Shop, a double blacksmith shop, Lyme, New York, NRHP-listed
- Rowe Farm, South Bethlehem, Albany County, New York
- Thorne Memorial School, Millbrook, New York
- Grooms Tavern Complex, Saratoga County, New York
- Hubbell Family Farm and Kelly's Corners Cemetery, Kelly's Corners, Delaware County, New York
- George Westinghouse Jr. Birthplace and Boyhood Home, Central Bridge, Schoharie County, New York

North Carolina

- Marion Jasper Jordan Farm, near Gulf, Chatham County, North Carolina
- John C. Campbell Folk School, Brasstown, North Carolina
- Baldwin's Mill, near Pittsboro, Chatham County, North Carolina
- Oakdale Cotton Mill Village, Jamestown, North Carolina; the smithy is a contributing building in an NRHP-listed historic district
- Bray-Paschal House, near Siler City, Chatham County, North Carolina

Ohio

- Henry Stoffel Blacksmith Shop, Sandusky, OH, NRHP-listed
- Hale Farm and Village, Bath Township, Summit County, Ohio

Oklahoma

- Blacksmith's House, Pawhuska, OK, NRHP-listed
- Owl Blacksmith Shop, Weatherford, OK, NRHP-listed
- Post Blacksmith Shop, Fort Gibson, OK, NRHP-listed

Oregon

- Hayse Blacksmith Shop, Eugene, OR, NRHP-listed
- Svenson Blacksmith Shop, Astoria, OR, NRHP-listed
- Vinsonhaler Blacksmith Shop, Nyssa, OR, NRHP-listed
- Windischar's General Blacksmith Shop, Mount Angel, OR, NRHP-listed
- Philip Foster Farm, Eagle Creek, Oregon
- Rogue River Ranch, Curry County, Oregon
- Hayse Blacksmith Shop, Eugene, Oregon
- Svenson Blacksmith Shop, Astoria, Oregon

Pennsylvania

- Brown-Moore Blacksmith Shop, Merrittstown, PA, NRHP-listed
- Reiff Farm with blacksmith shop from 1742, Oley Township, Berks County, Pennsylvania, NRHP-listed
- Strode's Mill Historic District, East Bradford Township, Chester County, Pennsylvania
- Altoona Works, Altoona, Pennsylvania
- Jacob Leiby Farm, Perry Township, Berks County, Pennsylvania
- Mary Ann Furnace Historic District, Longswamp Township, Berks County, Pennsylvania
- Minersville Coke Ovens, Carbon Township, Huntingdon County, Pennsylvania
- Colver Historic District, Cambria County, Pennsylvania
- Fort Hunter Historic District, Fort Hunter, Pennsylvania
- Cambria Iron Company, Johnstown, Pennsylvania
- Waterloo Mills Historic District, Easttown Township, Chester County, Pennsylvania
- Compass Inn, Laughlintown, Pennsylvania
- New Holland Machine Company, New Holland, Pennsylvania
- Hans Herr House, West Lampeter Township, Lancaster County, Pennsylvania

Rhode Island

- George Fayerweather Blacksmith Shop, Kingstown, RI, NRHP-listed
- Smith–Appleby House, Smithfield, Rhode Island
- Henry Eldred Farm, South Kingstown, Rhode Island

South Carolina

- Senn's Grist Mill-Blacksmith Shop-Orange Crush Bottling Plant, Summerton, South Carolina, NRHP-listed

South Dakota

- G.L. Stocker Blacksmith Shop, Gettysburg, SD, NRHP-listed

Tennessee

- Fruitvale, Tennessee
- John Geist and Sons Blacksmith Shop and House, Nashville, TN, NRHP-listed
- Andy Wood Log House and Willie Wood Blacksmith Shop, Georgetown, TN, NRHP-listed

Texas

- Freeze Building (1887), San Angelo, Texas
- List of museums in the Texas Panhandle, Texas

Utah

- Fugal Blacksmith Shop, Pleasant Grove, UT, NRHP-listed

Vermont

- Old Stone Blacksmith Shop, Cornwall, Vermont, NRHP-listed

Virginia

- Jackson Blacksmith Shop, Goochland, Virginia, NRHP-listed
- Weston (Casanova, Virginia)
- Appomattox Iron Works, Petersburg, Virginia
- Brook Hill Farm, near Forest, Bedford County, Virginia
- Cyrus McCormick Farm, Rockbridge County, Virginia
- Frederick County Poor Farm, Round Hill, Virginia
- Snowville Historic District, Snowville, Pulaski County, Virginia
- Sunnydale Farm, near Pound, Wise County, Virginia, NRHP-listed

Washington

- Stella Blacksmith Shop, Stella, WA, NRHP-listed

West Virginia

- Pickaway Rural Historic District, blacksmith shop built c.1800, Pickaway, West Virginia, NRHP-listed

Wisconsin

- Ritger Wagonmaking and Blacksmith Shop, Hartford, WI, NRHP-listed
- Kuehn Blacksmith Shop-Hardware Store, Kaukauna, WI, NRHP-listed
- Bartlett Blacksmith Shop-Scandinavian Hotel, Galesville, WI, NRHP-listed
- Vaughn's Hall and Blacksmith Shop, Montello, WI, NRHP-listed
- Pokrandt Blacksmith Shop, Waukesha, WI, NRHP-listed
- Cleveland's Hall and Blacksmith Shop, Brooklyn, WI, NRHP-listed
- Goodrich Blacksmith Shop, Milton, WI, NRHP-listed
- Cleveland's Hall and Blacksmith Shop, Brooklyn, Green County, Wisconsin
- Old World Wisconsin, an open-air museum, Waukesha County, Wisconsin
