= Mountain Justice (1937 film) =

1937 film

- Directed by: Michael Curtiz
- Written by: Norman Reilly Raine; Luci Ward
- Produced by: Henry Blanke; Louis F. Edelman
- Starring: George Brent; Josephine Hutchinson; Guy Kibbee; Margaret Hamilton
- Cinematography: Ernest Haller
- Edited by: George Amy
- Music by: Bernhard Kaun; Heinz Roemheld
- Production company: Warner Bros. Pictures
- Distributed by: Warner Bros. Pictures
- Release date: April 24, 1937
- Running time: 83 minutes
- Country: United States
- Language: English

Mountain Justice is a 1937 American drama film directed by Michael Curtiz, and starring George Brent, Josephine Hutchinson, and Guy Kibbee. It was produced and distributed by Warner Bros. Pictures. It is loosely based on the story of Edith Maxwell, who was convicted in 1935 of murdering her coal miner father in Pound, Virginia.

== Cast ==
- Josephine Hutchinson as Ruth Harkins
- George Brent as Paul Cameron
- Guy Kibbee as Dr. John Barnard
- Mona Barrie as Evelyn Wayne
- Robert Barrat as Jeff Harkins
- Margaret Hamilton as Phoebe Lamb
- Robert McWade as Horace Bamber
- Fuzzy Knight as Clem Biggars
- Edward Pawley as Tad Miller
- Elizabeth Risdon as Meg Harkins
- Granville Bates as Judge Crawley
- Russell Simpson as Mr. Turnbull
- Sybil Harris as Mrs. Turnbull
- Guy Wilkerson as Asaph Anderson
- Marcia Mae Jones as Bethie Harkins

== Preservation ==
- A print is held by the Library of Congress.
