= Cleveland Hall =

Cleveland Hall may refer to:

- Cleveland Hall, London, a meeting hall in London that was a center of the British secularist movement between 1861 and 1878
- Cleveland Hall, Nashville, a historic house in Nashville, Tennessee
- Cleveland's Hall and Blacksmith Shop, a historic site in the community of Attica, Wisconsin
