= John Geist and Sons Blacksmith Shop and House =

Historic blacksmith shop in Nashville, Tennessee

- U.S. National Register of Historic Places
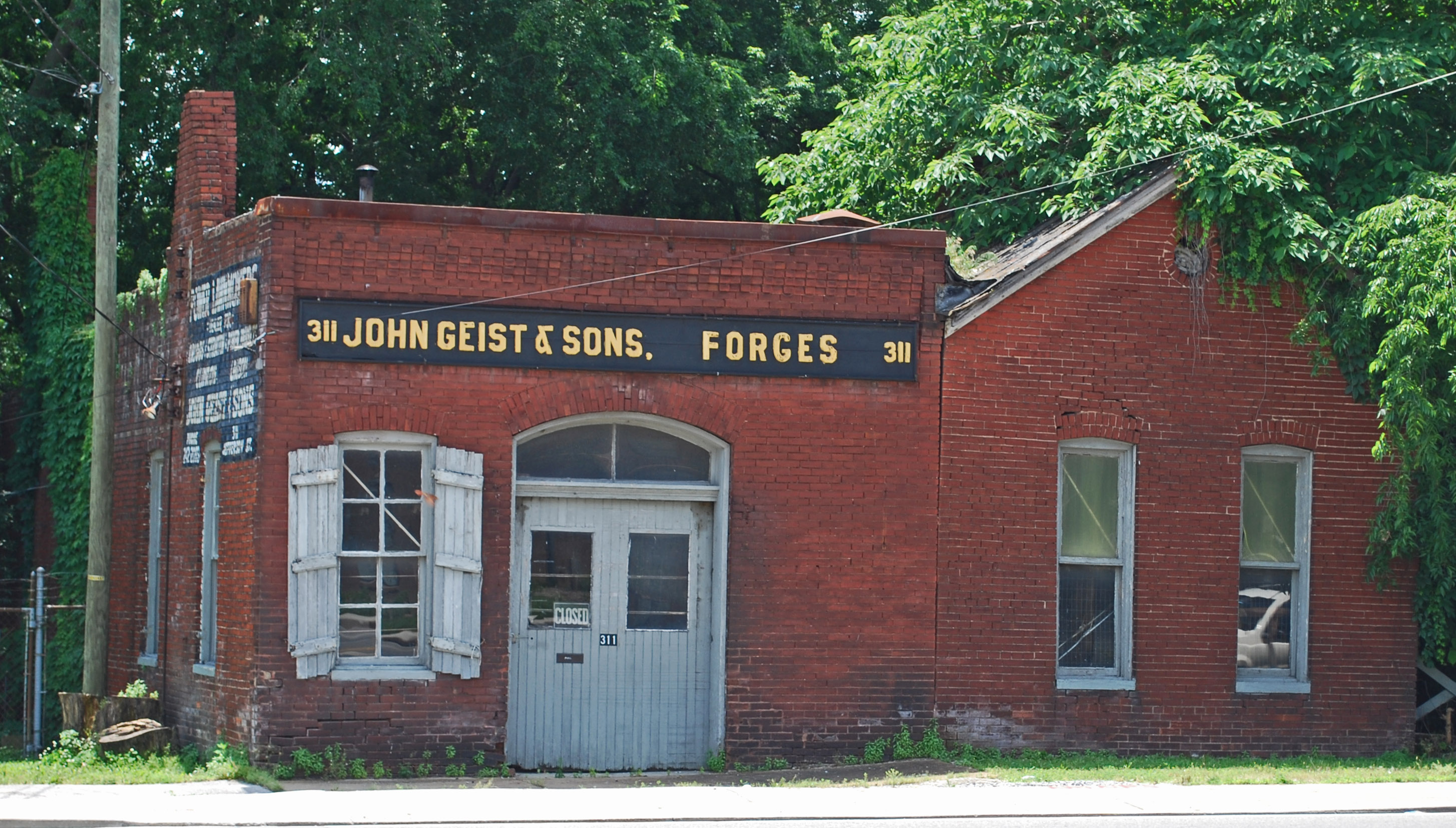
- John Geist & Sons Blacksmith Shop (2010)

- Location within Tennessee Location within the United States
- Location: 311 Jefferson St Nashville, Tennessee 37208
- Coordinates: 36.174722°N 86.785278°W
- Built: 1886 and 1900
- Architectural style: Brick
- Website: geistnashville.com
- NRHP reference No.: 80003792
- Added to NRHP: April 29, 1980

The John Geist and Sons Blacksmith Shop and House is a building located in Nashville, Tennessee. It was listed on the National Register of Historic Places listings in Davidson County, Tennessee (NRHP) in 1980. The business finally closed in 2006. In 2018 the building and site were developed and a restaurant opened in the blacksmith building.

== History ==
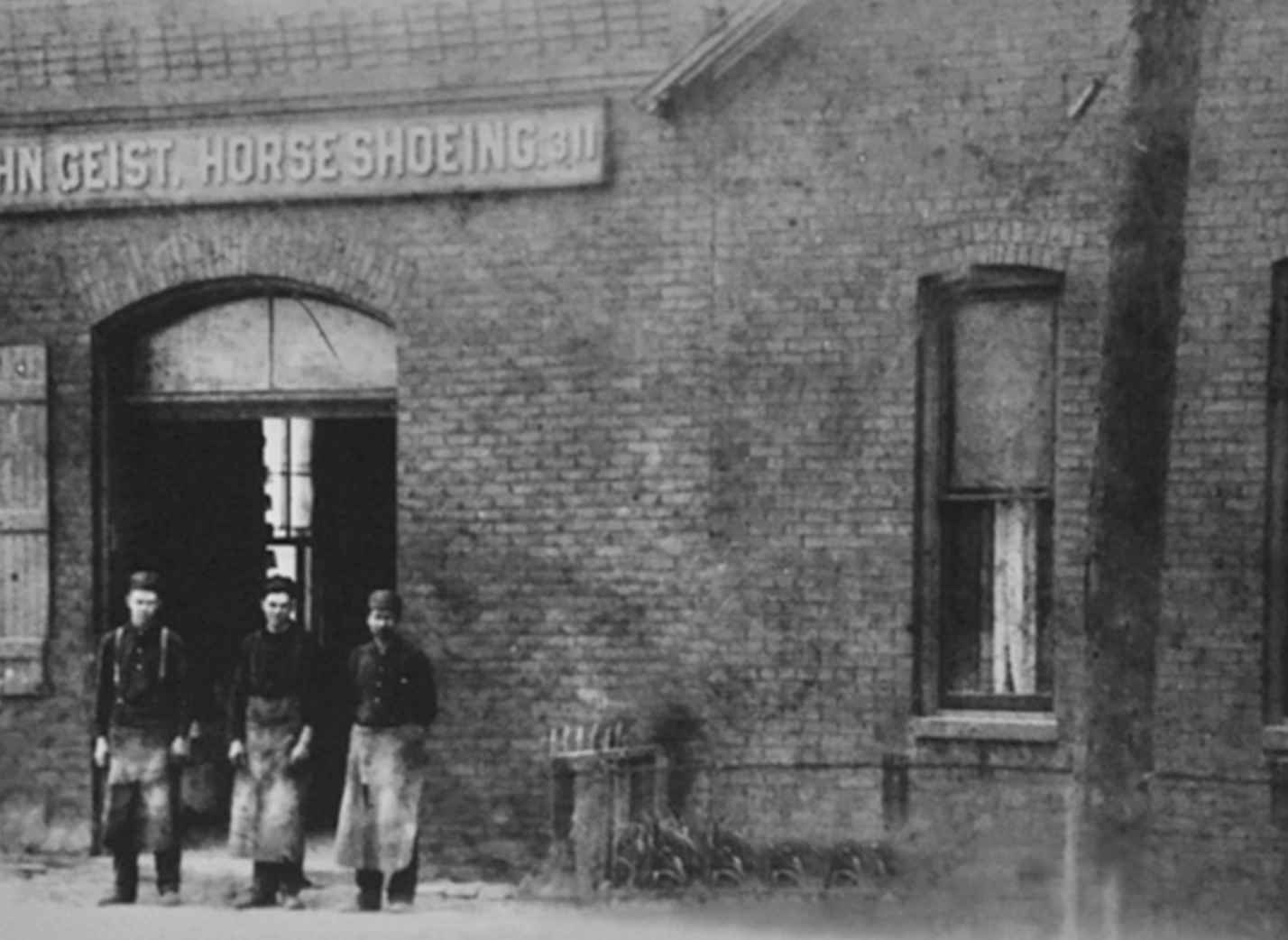
Image from (circa 1900) – John Geist and Sons Blacksmith Shop and House

The John Geist and Sons Blacksmith Shop and House was one of Nashville's oldest businesses to remain in continuous family ownership and operation (1886 to 2006). The first building constructed on the site in 1886 was a frame house: in 1900 a new brick building was built on the site and it remains today. When the automobile began to supplant the horse as transportation John Geist began to offer decorative ironwork. Until 2018 the building was still owned by the Geist family.

The building was added to the National Register of Historic Places listings in Davidson County, Tennessee (NRHP) on April 29, 1980.

== Redevelopment ==
The building is located in the Historic Germantown Neighborhood. The property includes three buildings. In 2013, a Nashville developer became involved in coming up with uses for the property. In 2018, a restaurant called "Geist" was developed and opened in the renovated blacksmith building that year. The restaurant's website states that the building houses a bar and a dining room which features handcrafted items from local artisans. They also claim to have a champagne garden, and a courtyard with an outdoor cooking stove.

== See also ==
- List of blacksmith shops
