= Rothsay, Minnesota =

City in Minnesota, United States

Rothsay
- City
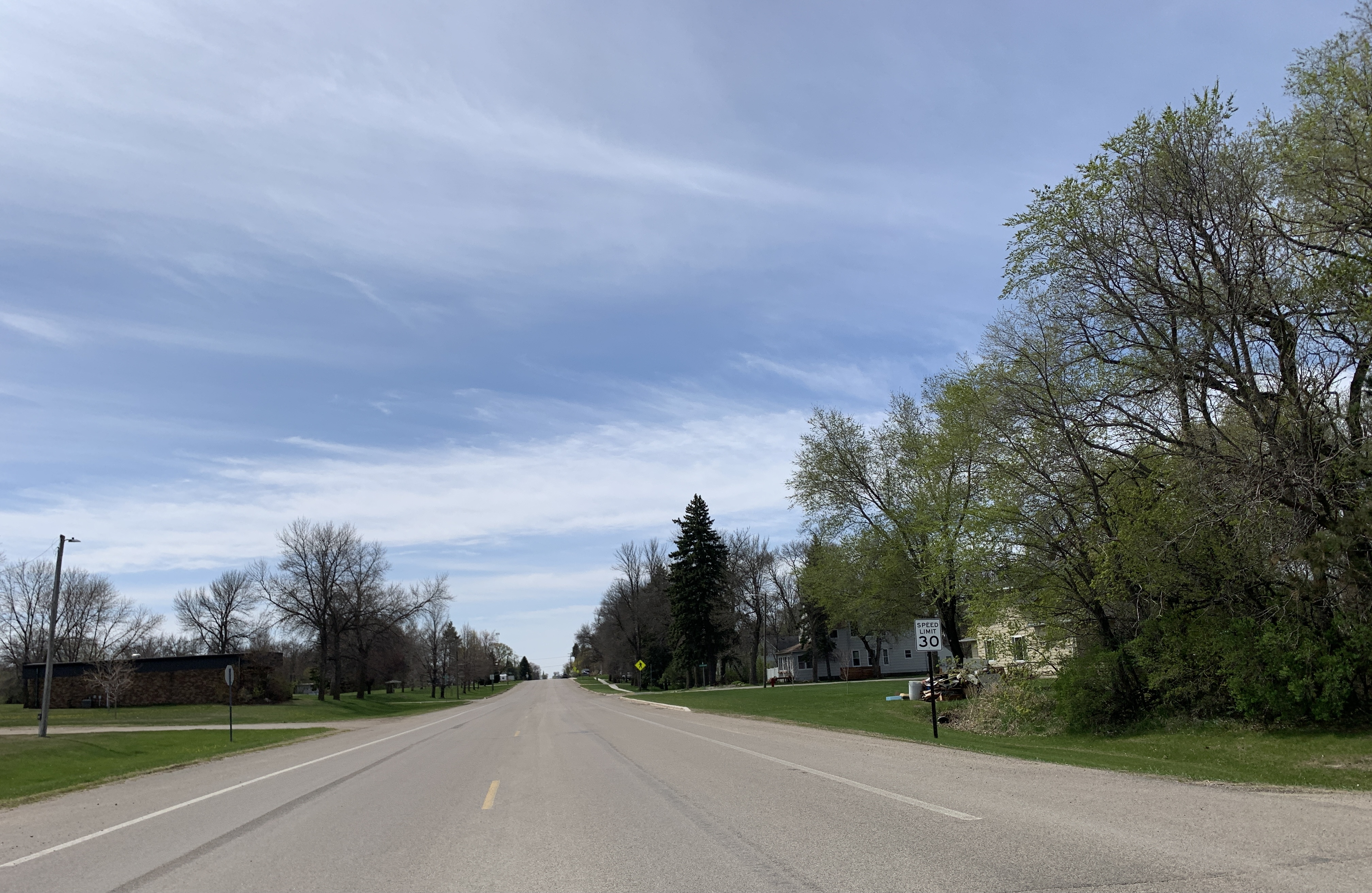

- Location of Rothsay, Minnesota
- Coordinates: 46°28′23″N 96°17′03″W
- Country: United States
- State: Minnesota
- Counties: Wilkin, Otter Tail

Area
  - Total: 0.86 sq mi (2.22 km^{2})
  - Land: 0.86 sq mi (2.22 km^{2})
  - Water: 0 sq mi (0.00 km^{2})
- Elevation: 1,188 ft (362 m)

Population (2020)
  - Total: 498
  - Estimate (2021): 491
  - Density: 580.5/sq mi (224.14/km^{2})
- Time zone: UTC-6 (CST)
  - Summer (DST): UTC-5 (CDT)
- ZIP code: 56579
- Area code: 218
- FIPS code: 27-56014
- GNIS feature ID: 2396439
- Website: https://rothsay.gov/

Rothsay is a city in Otter Tail and Wilkin counties in the State of Minnesota. The population was 498 at the 2020 census. One of Rothsay's major tourist attractions is the large prairie chicken statue near the northwest outskirts of the town, which was built in 1976 after Rothsay was designated the Prairie Chicken Capital of Minnesota.

The Otter Tail County portion of Rothsay is part of the Fergus Falls Micropolitan Statistical Area, while the Wilkin County portion is part of the Wahpeton, ND—MN Micropolitan Statistical Area.

== History ==
A post office called Rothsay has been in operation since 1880. The city was named after Rothesay, in Scotland. Rothsay contains one property listed on the National Register of Historic Places, the 1903 J. A. Johnson Blacksmith Shop.

== Geography ==
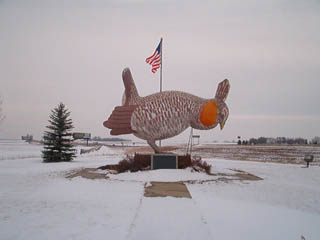
Rothsay Prairie Chicken Statue

According to the United States Census Bureau, the city has a total area of 0.88 square miles (2.28 km^{2}), all land.

Interstate Highway 94/US Highway 52, Center Street, and Main Avenue are three of the main routes in the community.

=== Climate ===
Climate data for Rothsay, Minnesota (1991–2020 normals, extremes 1959–present)
Month	Jan	Feb	Mar	Apr	May	Jun	Jul	Aug	Sep	Oct	Nov	Dec	Year
Record high °F (°C)	55 (13)	56 (13)	81 (27)	98 (37)	97 (36)	99 (37)	102 (39)	105 (41)	99 (37)	95 (35)	77 (25)	56 (13)	105 (41)
Mean daily maximum °F (°C)	18.2 (−7.7)	23.0 (−5.0)	36.3 (2.4)	52.7 (11.5)	66.9 (19.4)	75.8 (24.3)	80.0 (26.7)	78.4 (25.8)	70.3 (21.3)	54.7 (12.6)	38.0 (3.3)	24.1 (−4.4)	51.5 (10.8)
Daily mean °F (°C)	8.7 (−12.9)	12.8 (−10.7)	26.8 (−2.9)	42.0 (5.6)	56.1 (13.4)	66.1 (18.9)	70.0 (21.1)	68.3 (20.2)	59.5 (15.3)	44.8 (7.1)	29.4 (−1.4)	15.6 (−9.1)	41.7 (5.4)
Mean daily minimum °F (°C)	−0.9 (−18.3)	2.6 (−16.3)	17.2 (−8.2)	31.3 (−0.4)	45.2 (7.3)	56.4 (13.6)	60.0 (15.6)	58.1 (14.5)	48.8 (9.3)	35.0 (1.7)	20.9 (−6.2)	7.1 (−13.8)	31.8 (−0.1)
Record low °F (°C)	−39 (−39)	−37 (−38)	−26 (−32)	−5 (−21)	18 (−8)	32 (0)	40 (4)	35 (2)	20 (−7)	10 (−12)	−21 (−29)	−34 (−37)	−39 (−39)
Average precipitation inches (mm)	0.75 (19)	0.63 (16)	1.08 (27)	2.06 (52)	3.27 (83)	3.93 (100)	3.43 (87)	2.72 (69)	2.75 (70)	2.34 (59)	0.92 (23)	0.89 (23)	24.77 (629)
Average snowfall inches (cm)	11.4 (29)	7.7 (20)	7.2 (18)	4.1 (10)	0.0 (0.0)	0.0 (0.0)	0.0 (0.0)	0.0 (0.0)	0.0 (0.0)	1.6 (4.1)	6.9 (18)	10.7 (27)	49.6 (126)
Average precipitation days (≥ 0.01 in)	5.5	5.5	6.3	6.9	10.2	11.5	10.1	8.3	8.7	8.5	4.7	7.0	93.2
Average snowy days (≥ 0.1 in)	6.5	5.1	3.7	1.2	0.0	0.0	0.0	0.0	0.0	0.8	2.5	7.1	26.9
Source: NOAA

== Demographics ==
Historical population
Census	Pop.	Note	%±
1890	174		—
1900	296		70.1%
1910	343		15.9%
1920	398		16.0%
1930	386		−3.0%
1940	415		7.5%
1950	537		29.4%
1960	457		−14.9%
1970	448		−2.0%
1980	476		6.3%
1990	433		−9.0%
2000	497		14.8%
2010	493		−0.8%
2020	498		1.0%
2021 (est.)	491		−1.4%
U.S. Decennial Census; 2020 Census

=== 2010 census ===
As of the census of 2010, there were 493 people, 211 households, and 140 families living in the city. The population density was 560.2 inhabitants per square mile (216.3/km^{2}). There were 250 housing units at an average density of 284.1 per square mile (109.7/km^{2}). The racial makeup of the city was 98.8% White, 0.8% Native American, and 0.4% Asian. Hispanic or Latino of any race were 0.2% of the population.

There were 211 households, of which 32.7% had children under the age of 18 living with them, 49.8% were married couples living together, 9.5% had a female householder with no husband present, 7.1% had a male householder with no wife present, and 33.6% were non-families. 28.4% of all households were made up of individuals, and 11.4% had someone living alone who was 65 years of age or older. The average household size was 2.34 and the average family size was 2.80.

The median age in the city was 37.1 years. 25.8% of residents were under the age of 18; 5.7% were between the ages of 18 and 24; 28.8% were from 25 to 44; 24% were from 45 to 64; and 15.8% were 65 years of age or older. The gender makeup of the city was 51.3% male and 48.7% female.

=== 2000 census ===
As of the census of 2000, there were 497 people, 201 households, and 125 families living in the city. The population density was 123.5 inhabitants per square mile (47.7/km^{2}). There were 231 housing units at an average density of 57.4 per square mile (22.2/km^{2}). The racial makeup of the city was 97.59% White, 0.40% Native American, 1.01% from other races, and 1.01% from two or more races. Hispanic or Latino of any race were 1.01% of the population.

There were 201 households, out of which 35.3% had children under the age of 18 living with them, 51.2% were married couples living together, 9.5% had a female householder with no husband present, and 37.8% were non-families. 33.8% of all households were made up of individuals, and 20.4% had someone living alone who was 65 years of age or older. The average household size was 2.47 and the average family size was 3.20.

In the city, the population was spread out, with 28.4% under the age of 18, 8.9% from 18 to 24, 28.2% from 25 to 44, 15.7% from 45 to 64, and 18.9% who were 65 years of age or older. The median age was 35 years. For every 100 females, there were 89.0 males. For every 100 females age 18 and over, there were 88.4 males.

The median income for a household in the city was $31,058, and the median income for a family was $34,479. Males had a median income of $25,625 versus $19,286 for females. The per capita income for the city was $14,854. About 6.2% of families and 9.6% of the population were below the poverty line, including 16.8% of those under age 18 and 9.7% of those age 65 or over.
