= Flat Gap High School =

- U.S. National Register of Historic Places
- Virginia Landmarks Register
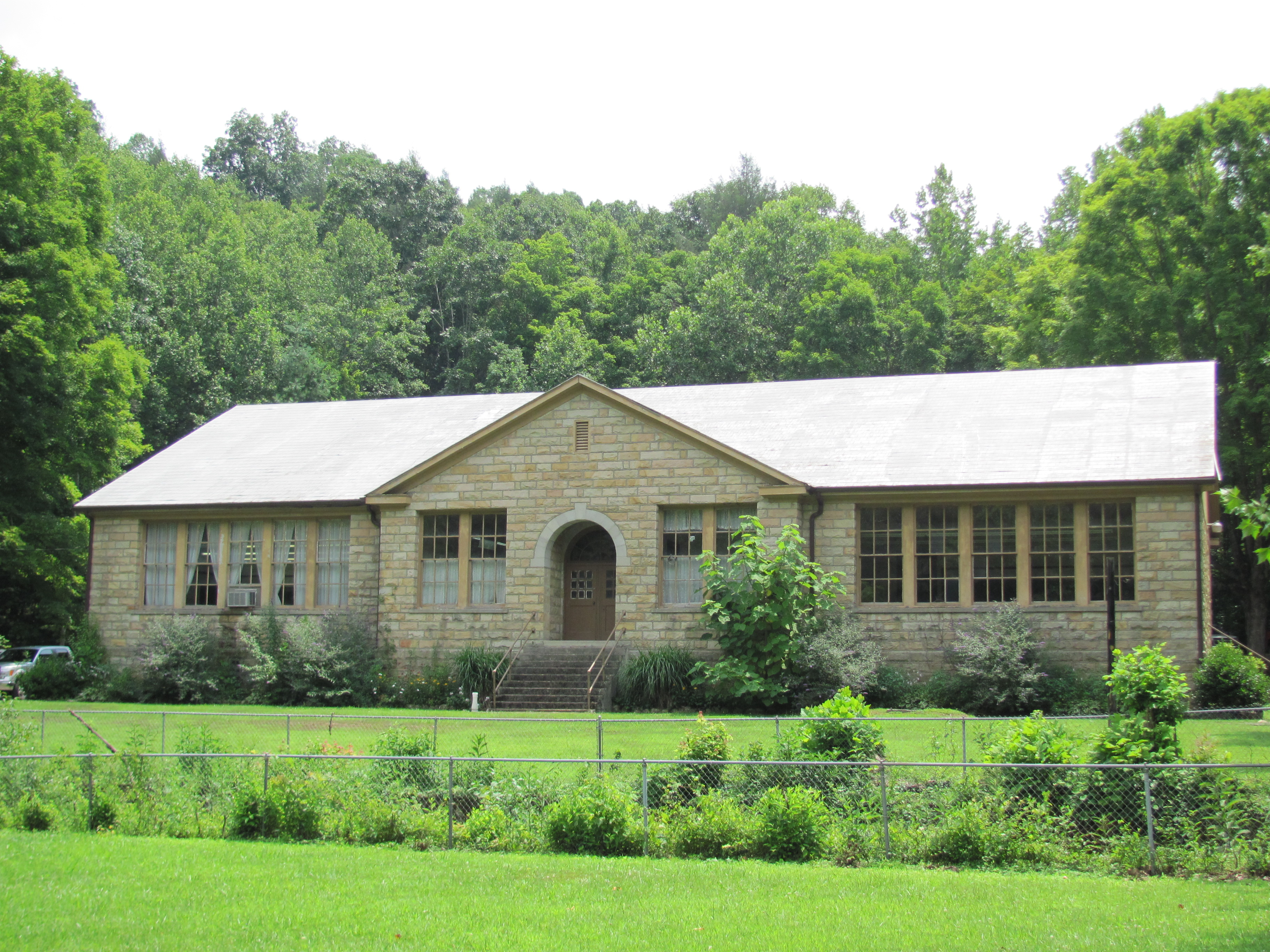
- Flat Gap High School, July 2010

- Location within Virginia Location within the United States
- Location: 4408 Stone Mountain Rd., Pound, Virginia
- Coordinates: 37°05′00″N 82°41′37″W
- Area: less than one acre
- Built: 1935-1936
- Architect: Pepper, Thomas M.; et al.
- Architectural style: Classical Revival
- NRHP reference No.: 09000123
- VLR No.: 097-0395

Significant dates
- Added to NRHP: March 6, 2009
- Designated VLR: December 18, 2008

Flat Gap High School, also known as Flat Gap School Community Center, is a historic high school building located at Pound, Wise County, Virginia. It was built in 1935–1936 and is a one-story building with a three-part plan, consisting of a front gabled midsection and set-back, side-gable wings. The Classical Revival design references include rusticated stonework, molded cornice with gable returns, and a round-arched principal entrance with granite voussoirs and keystone. It ceased use as a school in the 1970s, and has been adapted for use as a community center.

It was listed on the National Register of Historic Places in 2009.
