= Wiley Rock Schoolhouse =

- U.S. National Register of Historic Places
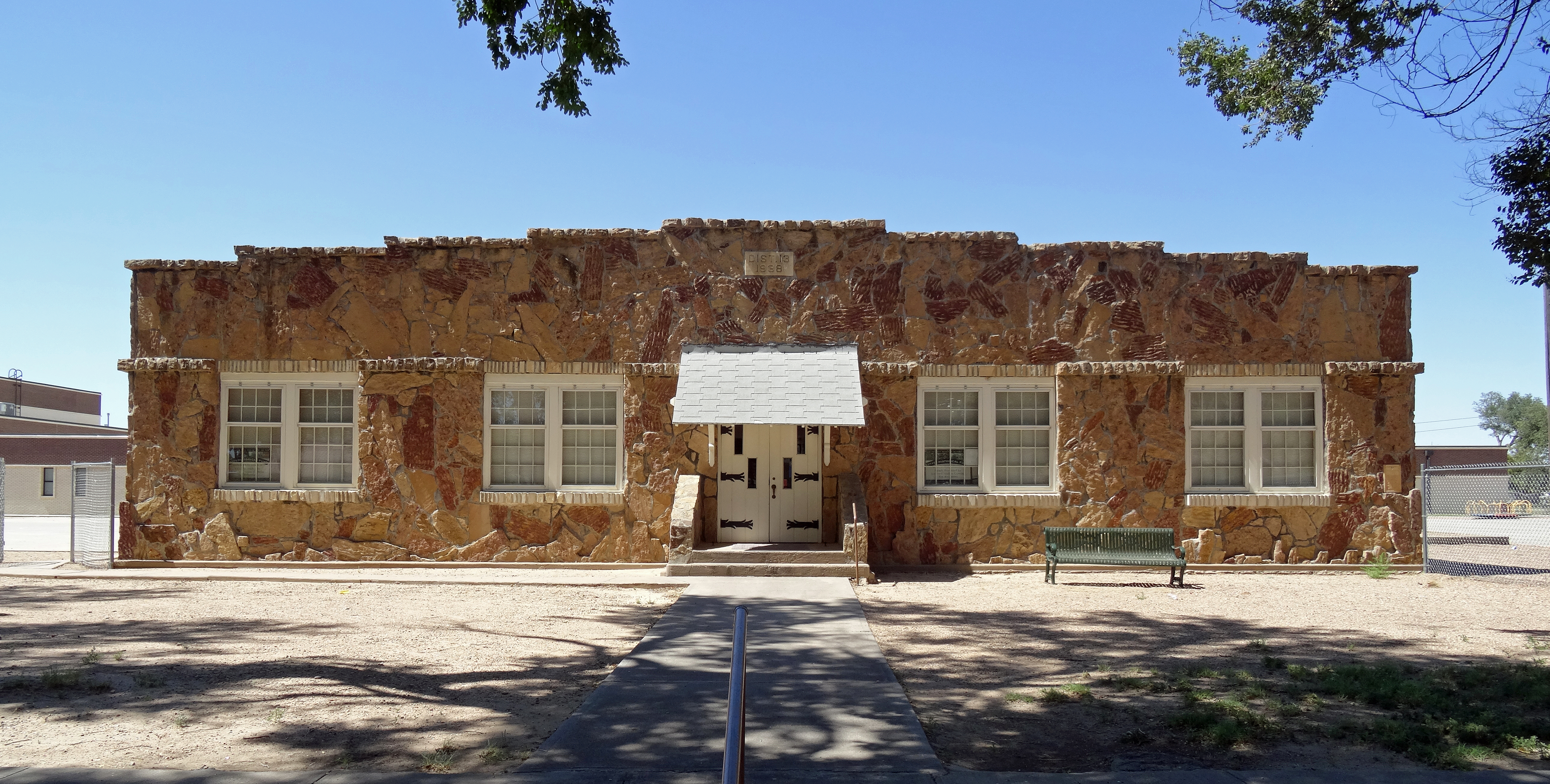

- Location within Colorado
- Location: 603 Main St., Wiley, Colorado
- Coordinates: 38°09′24″N 102°43′11″W
- Area: less than one acre
- Built by: Works Progress Administration
- Architectural style: Late 19th and Early 20th Century American Movements
- NRHP reference No.: 04000057
- Added to NRHP: February 20, 2004

The Wiley Rock Schoolhouse, at 603 Main St. in Wiley, Colorado, United States, was listed on the National Register of Historic Places in 2004.

It was built in 1938 as a Works Progress Administration project.

It served as an annex to the high school and included space for agriculture classes, for a blacksmith shop, and a music room.

It is 70 by 70 feet (21 m × 21 m) in plan, and was built of heavy gray rock reclaimed from two buildings that the school purchased for the purpose.
