= Edith Maxwell =

Convicted murderer

Edith Maxwell (April 24, 1914 – May 2, 1979) was a Virginian schoolteacher who, at the age of 21, was convicted of murdering her father in rural Appalachia, triggering a nationwide media sensation.

On July 20, 1935, the young teacher spent the evening with friends at "the Little Ritz" in Wise, Virginia. When she returned home late at night in Pound, Virginia, she had an argument with Trigg Maxwell, her coal miner father. Trigg attempted to whip his daughter for staying out late. According to Edith Maxwell, during the fight, she hit her father with a high heeled shoe, accidentally killing him. Other accounts asserted various alternate scenarios, including that she hit her father with an iron skillet, that he fell and banged his head on a butcher's block, or even that he had had a stroke and died.

The prosecutor's case was circumstantial, and no one had a good idea of what really happened that night. After a two-day trial, Edith was found guilty by an all-male jury in November 1935, and when that decision was overturned in 1936, a second trial later found her guilty of murder and she was sentenced to 25 years in jail.

Edith's mother, Ann, was originally jointly charged with her for Trigg's death, however after Edith's first trial, the states attorney decided to not go forward for lack of sufficient evidence for a first-degree conviction. Under Virginia law at that time, once Edith was convicted, Ann could not be charged with accessory after the fact as the law didn't allow prosecution of parents.

The case became a national sensation, since recent movies at the time, including The Trail of the Lonesome Pine and the best selling novel of the same name, made rural Appalachia exotic to the rest of America, with tales of family abuse, moonshining and family feuds. She became known as Appalachia's "slipper slayer" and a cause célèbre, and even Eleanor Roosevelt appealed for her release. The Washington Post raised funds for her legal defense. In 1937, Hollywood created a movie loosely based on her story, Mountain Justice, which fictionalized her account by adding new elements to the story, including the heroine narrowly avoiding being lynched by the townsfolk.

The governor of Virginia, James Hubert Price, pardoned her in 1941. After her release from prison, she left Virginia and changed her name to Ann Grayson, settling in Indiana. She married and had children and lived quietly until her death at age 65 in 1979.

== See also ==
- Familicide

== Bibliography ==
- "Accused Killer, Media Darling." Miller, Suzanne. Discover: History & Heritage. 2016.
- Best, Gary Dean. Witch Hunt in Wise County: The Persecution of Edith Maxwell. Westport, Conn: Praeger, 1994.
- Hatfield, Sharon. Never Seen the Moon: The Trials of Edith Maxwell. Urbana: University of Illinois Press, 2005.
- Staples, Abram P., and Joseph L. Jr Kelly. Edith Maxwell Vs. Commonwealth of Virginia: Brief on Behalf of the Commonwealth. Staunton, Va: The Court, 1930.
- The Trial of Edith Maxwell, Wise County, Virginia, 1935: Court Transcript of Actual Trial. Wise, VA: Wise County Historical Society, 2000.
