= Fugal Dugout House =

Historic house in Utah, United States

- U.S. National Register of Historic Places
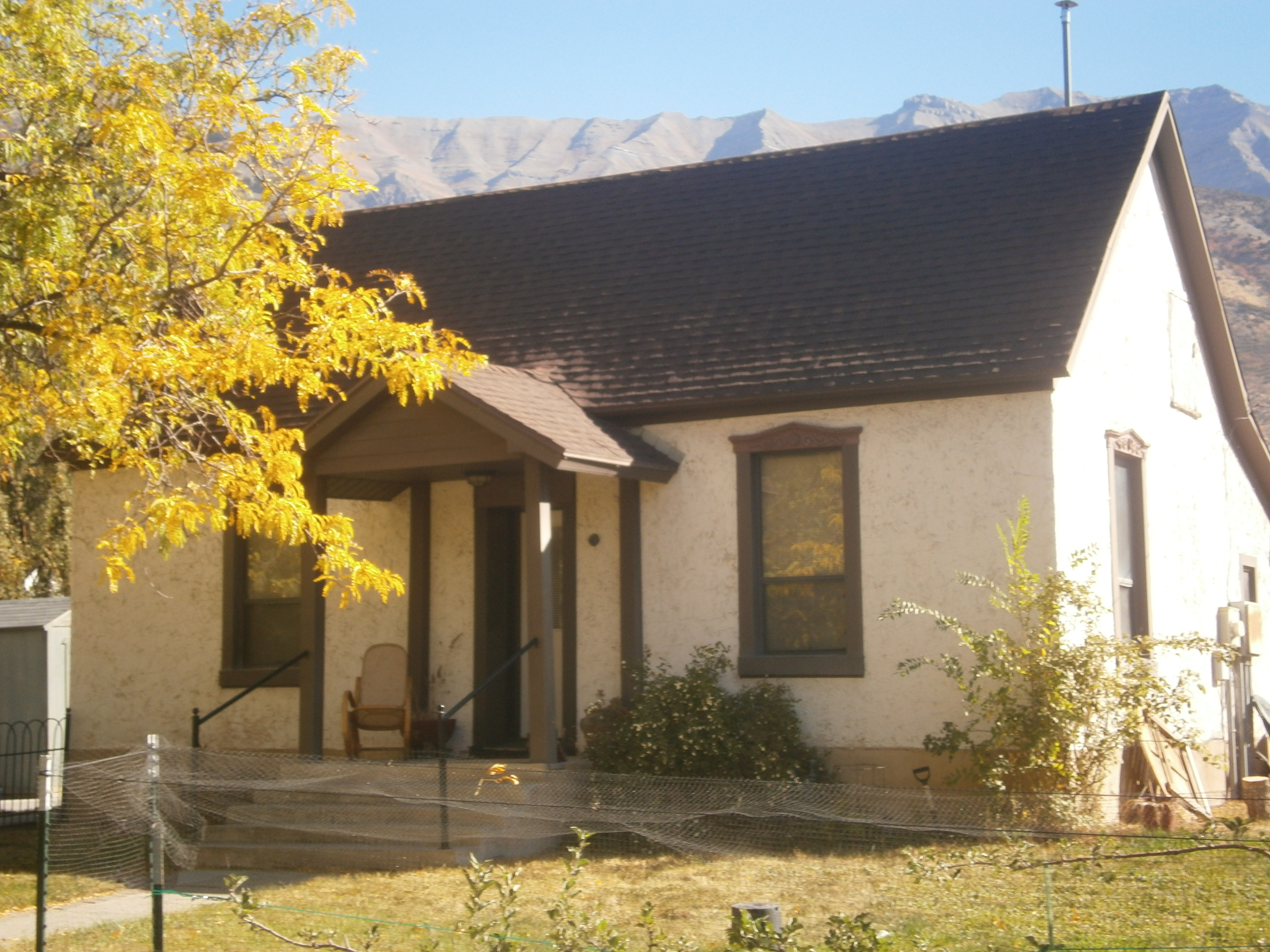

- Location within Utah Location within the United States
- Location: 630 North 400 East, Pleasant Grove, Utah
- Coordinates: 40°22′14″N 111°43′55″W
- Area: less than one acre
- Built: 1869; 1882
- Built by: Fugal, Andreas Christensen; Fugal, Christian Christensen
- Architectural style: Dugout, Other
- NRHP reference No.: 86000611
- Added to NRHP: March 27, 1986

The Fugal Dugout House is a historic house at what is now 630 North 400 East in Pleasant Grove, Utah, built in 1869.

== Description and history ==
It was used as the foundation for a stone house in 1882. It "is architecturally significant as the only known example in Utah of a dugout serving as the basis for a later house expansion." It was listed on the National Register of Historic Places in 1986.

== See also ==
- Fugal Blacksmith Shop
