= Jackson Blacksmith Shop =

Historic commercial building in Virginia, United States

- U.S. National Register of Historic Places
- Virginia Landmarks Register
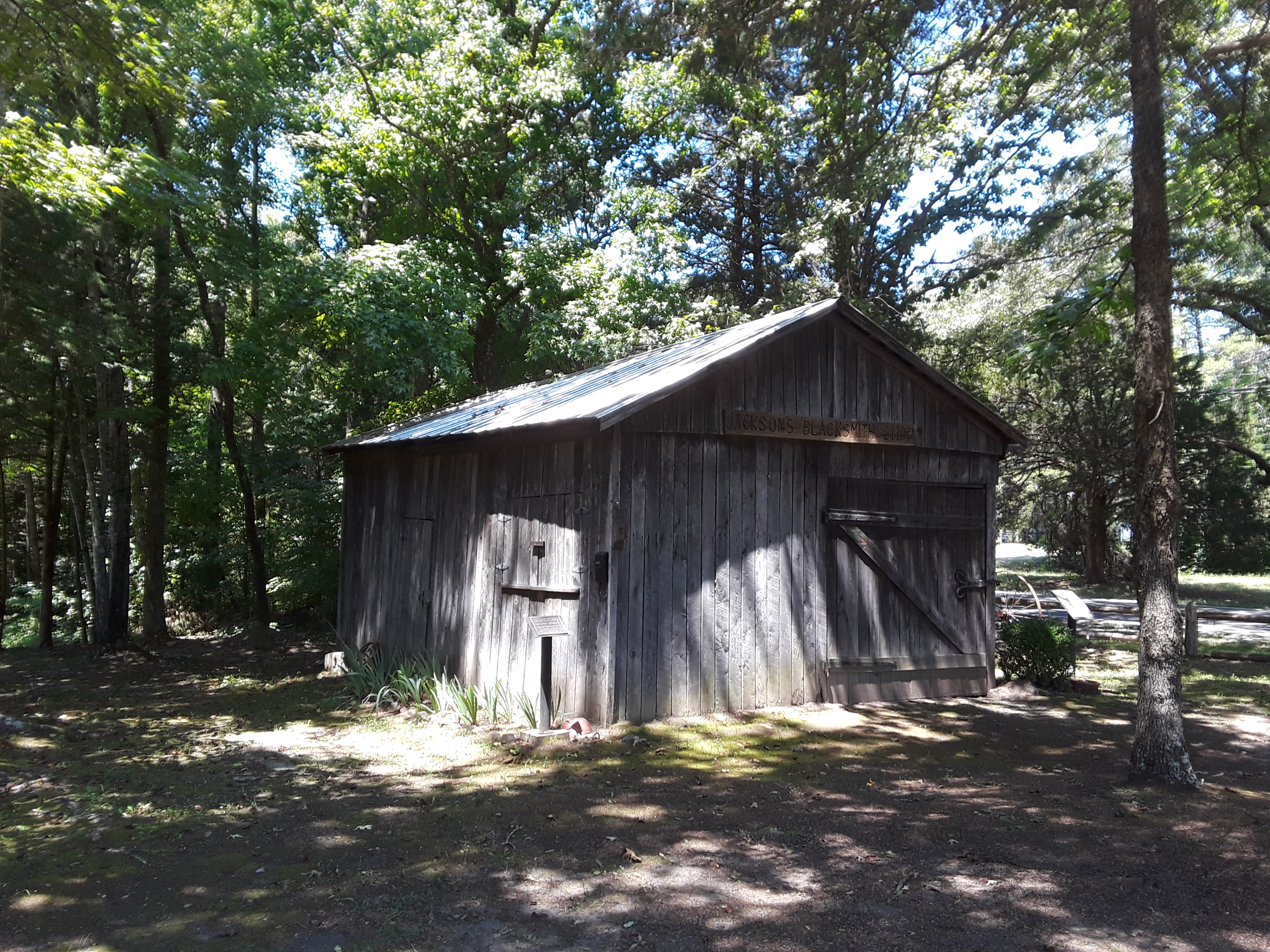

- Location within Virginia Location within the United States
- Location: 2558 Blacksmith Shop Rd., near Goochland, Virginia
- Coordinates: 37°44′41″N 77°54′18″W
- Area: 1.8 acres (0.73 ha)
- Built: 1932
- Built by: G. Wilson Jackson, Sr.
- Architectural style: Pole-construction, Shed
- NRHP reference No.: 97001511
- VLR No.: 037-0163

Significant dates
- Added to NRHP: December 11, 1997
- Designated VLR: September 17, 1997

Jackson Blacksmith Shop is a historic blacksmith shop located near Goochland, Goochland County, Virginia. It was built in 1932, and is a one-story, rectangular, pole structure, shed-type building. It measures 16 feet by 24 feet and has a gable roof. The shop remains in operation.

It was listed on the National Register of Historic Places in 1997.
