= Sunnydale Farm =

- U.S. National Register of Historic Places
- Virginia Landmarks Register
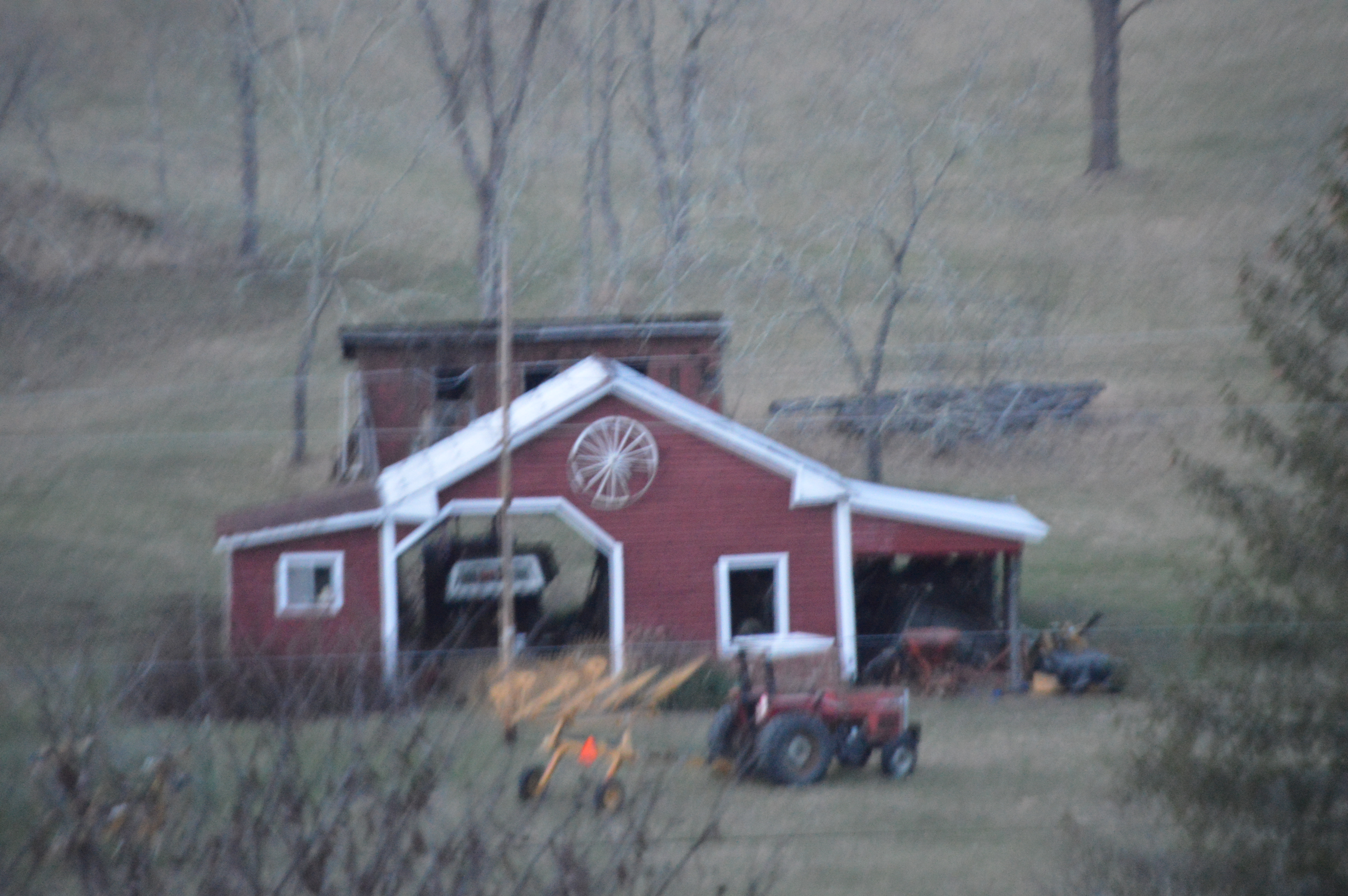
- One of the outbuildings

- Location within Virginia Location within the United States
- Location: 12439 Sunnydale Farm Rd., near Pound, Virginia
- Coordinates: 37°09′16″N 82°33′28″W
- Area: 40 acres (16 ha)
- Built: 1919
- Architectural style: Craftsman / bungalow
- NRHP reference No.: 11000352
- VLR No.: 097-0403

Significant dates
- Added to NRHP: June 8, 2011
- Designated VLR: March 17, 2011

Sunnydale Farm is a historic home and farm complex located near Pound, Wise County, Virginia. The complex includes contributing and noncontributing buildings, structures, and sites dating from the 19th century or before to the 1960s. The Sunnydale Farm House, was built about 1919, and is a 1 1/2-story, frame Craftsman bungalow with vinyl and novelty weatherboard siding. Also on the property are the contributing stone well, a ruinous stone and frame root cellar, a frame chicken house, a frame blacksmith shop with a wagon and tractor, and a family cemetery. Other contributing resources are the sites of the Millard cabin and associated root cellar, coal mine openings, and the site of a coal mine tipple and bridge ruins.

It was listed on the National Register of Historic Places in 2011.
