= J. A. Johnson Blacksmith Shop =

- U.S. National Register of Historic Places
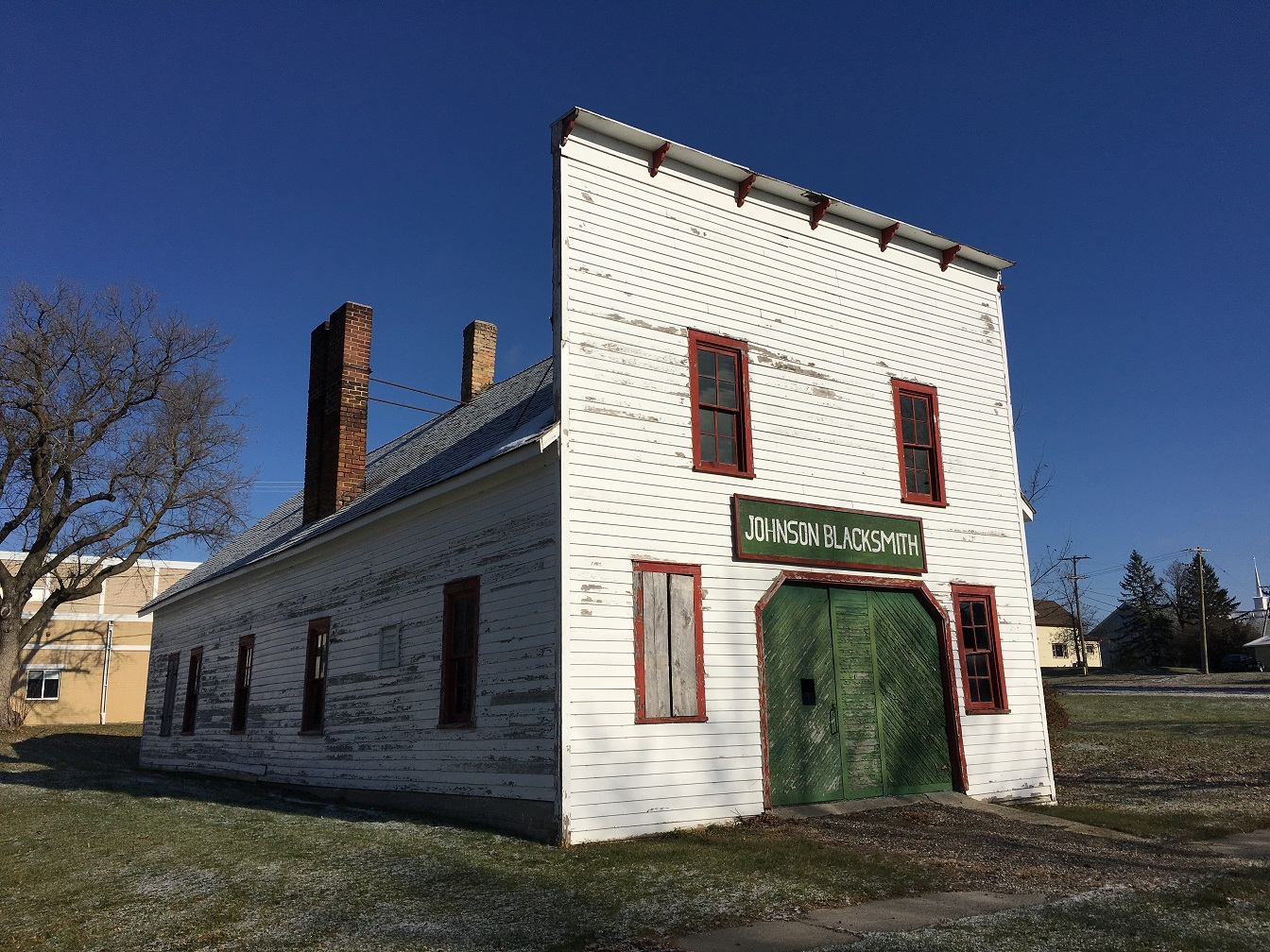
- The J. A. Johnson Blacksmith Shop from the southwest

- Location within Minnesota Location within the United States
- Location: Main Avenue West & 2nd Street West, Rothsay, Minnesota
- Coordinates: 46°28′30.5″N 96°16′59.2″W
- Area: Less than one acre
- Built: 1903
- NRHP reference No.: 96000174
- Designated: February 23, 1996

The J. A. Johnson Blacksmith Shop is a historic commercial building in Rothsay, Minnesota, United States. It is one of Minnesota's most intact early-20th-century blacksmith shops, and still contains a large portion of its original, handforged equipment. The shop was listed on the National Register of Historic Places in 1996 for its local significance in the theme of commerce. It was nominated for being a rare intact example of the style of blacksmith shop once common to small Midwestern farming communities in the first half of the 20th century.

== See also ==
- National Register of Historic Places listings in Wilkin County, Minnesota
