= Preuit Oaks =

Historic house in Alabama, United States

- U.S. National Register of Historic Places
- Alabama Register of Landmarks and Heritage
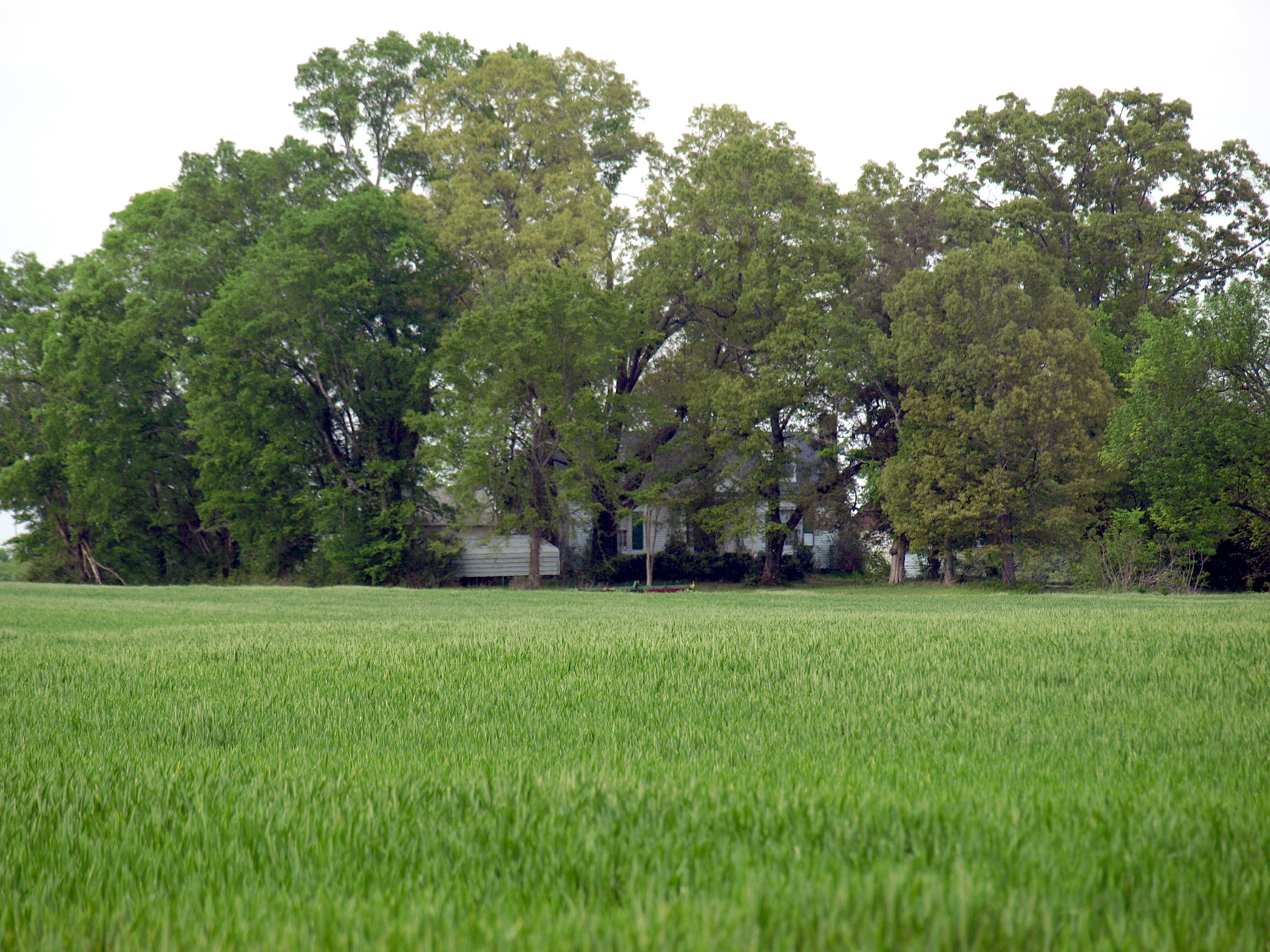
- The house in April 2017

- Location within Alabama Location within the United States
- Location: Cotton Town Rd., Leighton, Alabama
- Coordinates: 34°40′26″N 87°30′35″W
- Area: 156.7 acres (63.4 ha)
- Built: 1847
- Architectural style: Greek Revival, Federal
- NRHP reference No.: 86000997

Significant dates
- Added to NRHP: May 8, 1986
- Designated ARLH: November 26, 1978

Preuit Oaks is a historic plantation house near Leighton in Colbert County, Alabama, United States. The house was built in 1847 by Dr. John S. Napier, on land originally owned by his father-in-law. The house and land were sold in 1851 to W. Richard Preuit, who developed the property into a large cotton plantation using the forced labour of enslaved people. At its peak in 1860, the plantation covered 1,500 acres (600 ha); following the Civil War, its productivity declined, and Preuit's holdings had depleted to only 400 acres (160 ha) upon his death in 1882. The house has remained in the family since.

The house is a 1 1/2-story structure with a gable roof punctuated by two dormer windows on the front façade. A pedimented portico supported by square columns covers the double entry door, which is surrounded by sidelights and a transom. Twelve-over-twelve sash windows sit on either side of the portico. The house has a center-hall plan with two rooms on either side. A one-story, shed-roofed addition projects from the rear of the house. In addition to the house, the complex also contains 14 buildings and structures constructed between 1850 and 1890, including an office, kitchen, cook's house, corn cribs, barn, gin house, tenant house, smokehouse, blacksmith shop, and the family cemetery.

The house was listed on the Alabama Register of Landmarks and Heritage in 1978 and the National Register of Historic Places in 1986.
