= Dr. James Compton House =

Historic house in Missouri, United States

- U.S. National Register of Historic Places
- Location within Missouri Location within the United States
- Location: 5410 NE Oak Ridge Rd., Kansas City, Missouri
- Coordinates: 39°11′47″N 94°30′43″W
- Area: 7.5 acres (3.0 ha)
- Built: 1829
- NRHP reference No.: 79003677
- Added to NRHP: July 10, 1979

Dr. James Compton House, also known as the Sandy's Oak Ridge Manor Tea House , is a historic home located at Kansas City, Clay County, Missouri. The original section was built about 1829, as a log dwelling. It was later enlarged and expanded through 1952 during its ownership by the Compton family. Also on the property are the contributing frame blacksmith shop and frame guest house. It is one of the oldest surviving residential structures in the city.

It was listed on the National Register of Historic Places in 1979.
