= Bigler Building =

- U.S. National Register of Historic Places
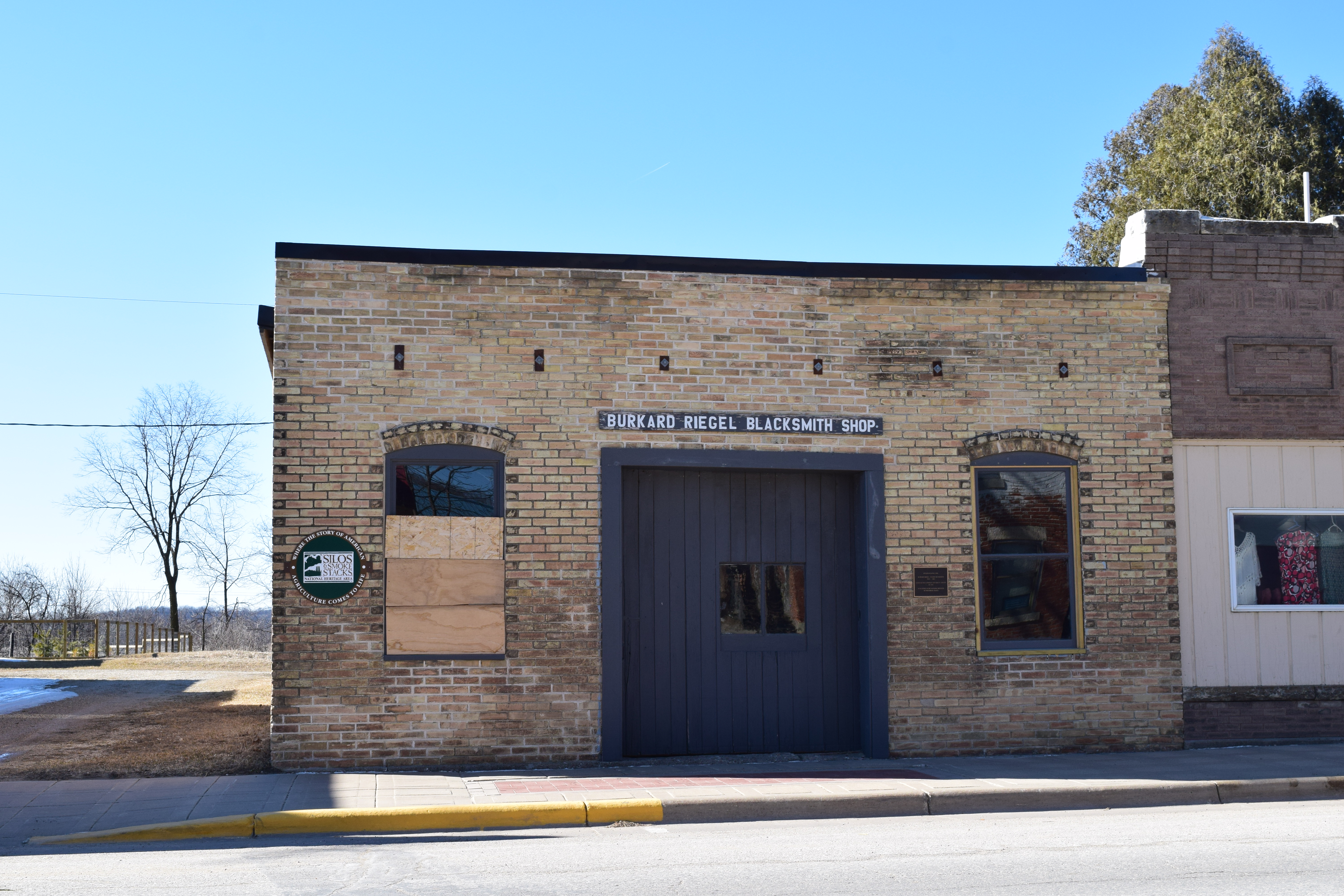

- Location within Iowa Location within the United States
- Location: 210 Mill St. Clermont, Iowa
- Coordinates: 42°59′58.6″N 91°39′23.7″W
- Area: less than one acre
- Built: c. 1906
- NRHP reference No.: 95000691
- Added to NRHP: June 9, 1995

The Bigler Building, also known as the Riegel Blacksmith Shop, is a historic building located in Clermont, Iowa, United States. The simple, single-story brick structure was built in about 1906 by Fred Bigler who operated the local lumberyard and was a contractor. This property had long been the location for a blacksmith shop. Burkhard Riegel, a German immigrant, opened his shop in this building in 1931. He rented the space until he bought the building from Bigler's widow in 1946. After his death in 1990, the Clermont Historical Society acquired the building for a living history museum, and it contains its original blacksmithing equipment and furnishings. It was listed on the National Register of Historic Places on June 9, 1995.
