= Chandler-Parsons Blacksmith Shop =

- U.S. National Register of Historic Places
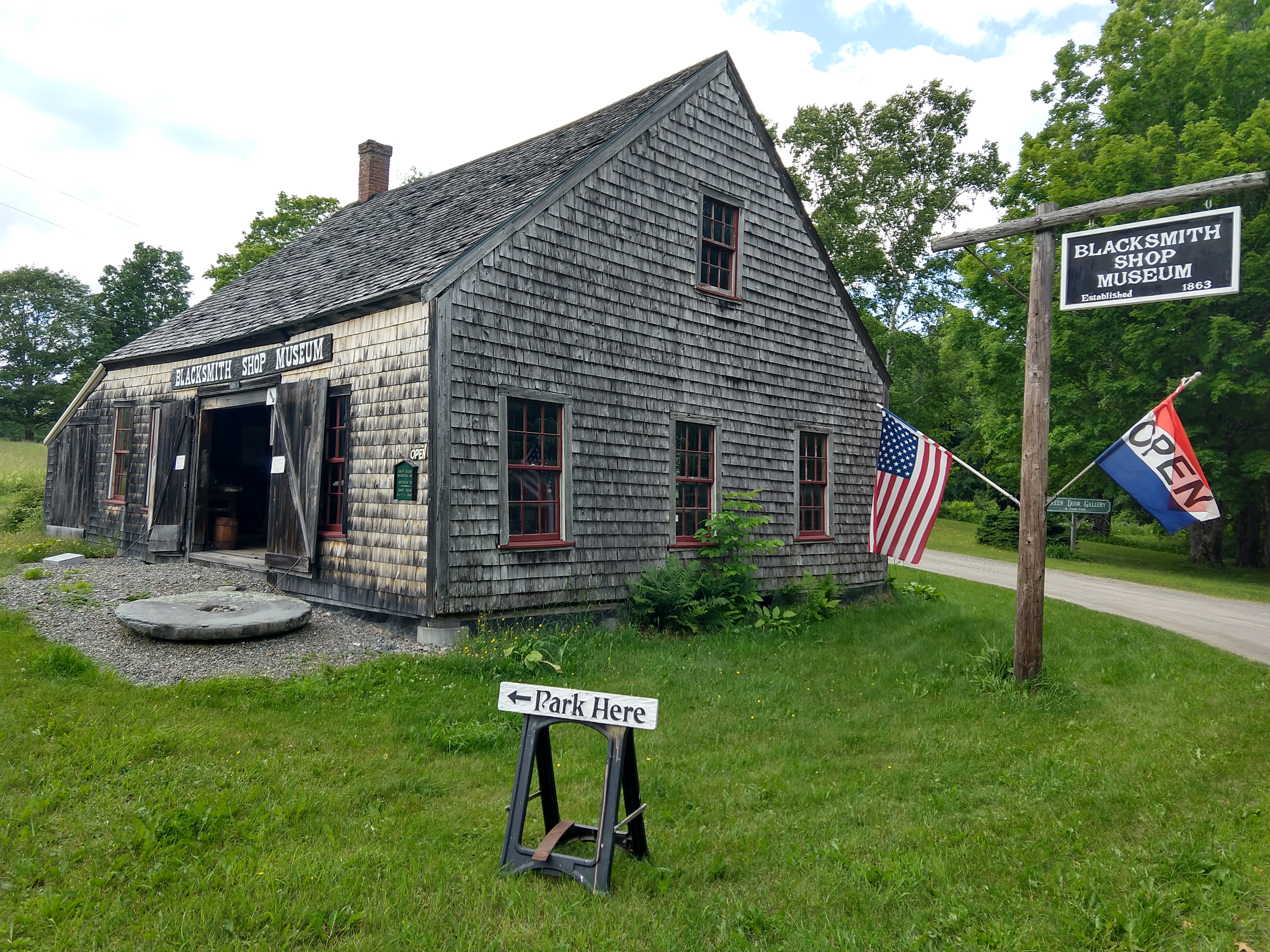

- Location within Maine Location within the United States
- Location: 107 Dawes Street, Dover-Foxcroft, Maine
- Coordinates: 45°12′13″N 69°15′27″W
- Area: less than one acre
- Built: 1860
- NRHP reference No.: 89001702
- Added to NRHP: October 16, 1989

The Chandler-Parsons Blacksmith Shop, now the Blacksmith Shop Museum, is a historic blacksmith shop at 107 Dawes Road in Dover-Foxcroft, Maine. Believed to be built in the early 1860s, it is one of a very small number of relatively unaltered rural 19th-century blacksmithies in the state. It is owned and operated by the local historical society as a museum, and was listed on the National Register of Historic Places in 1989.

== Description and history ==
The smithy is a small single-story wood frame structure, with a gable roof and a wood shingle exterior. A shed-roofed addition extends across the western facade. The main facade, facing south, is four bays wide, with the main entrance in one of the center bays and sash windows in the other bays. The main double door is attached via heavy wrought iron hinges. The interior is very plain, with exposed framing, and houses a collection of original 19th-century blacksmithing tools.

The shop was probably built in the early 1860s by Nicholas A. Chandler, whose family owned the land at the time, and who was listed in later business directories as a blacksmith, but was also known for breeding and training horses. The next owner, Henry Parsons, was Chandler's brother-in-law, and is believed to be responsible for a number of additions and alterations to the building, including changing its roofline and adding the shed-roof addition. Parsons operated the smithy as a business until about 1905, and the shop was thereafter used intermittently by area residents. It was acquired in 1964 by the Dover-Foxcroft Historical Society, which now operates the property as a museum. The society has added a modern building to the property for use as a demonstration area. The museum is open between Memorial Day and October.

== See also ==
- National Register of Historic Places listings in Piscataquis County, Maine
