= Cook Blacksmith Shop =

- U.S. National Register of Historic Places
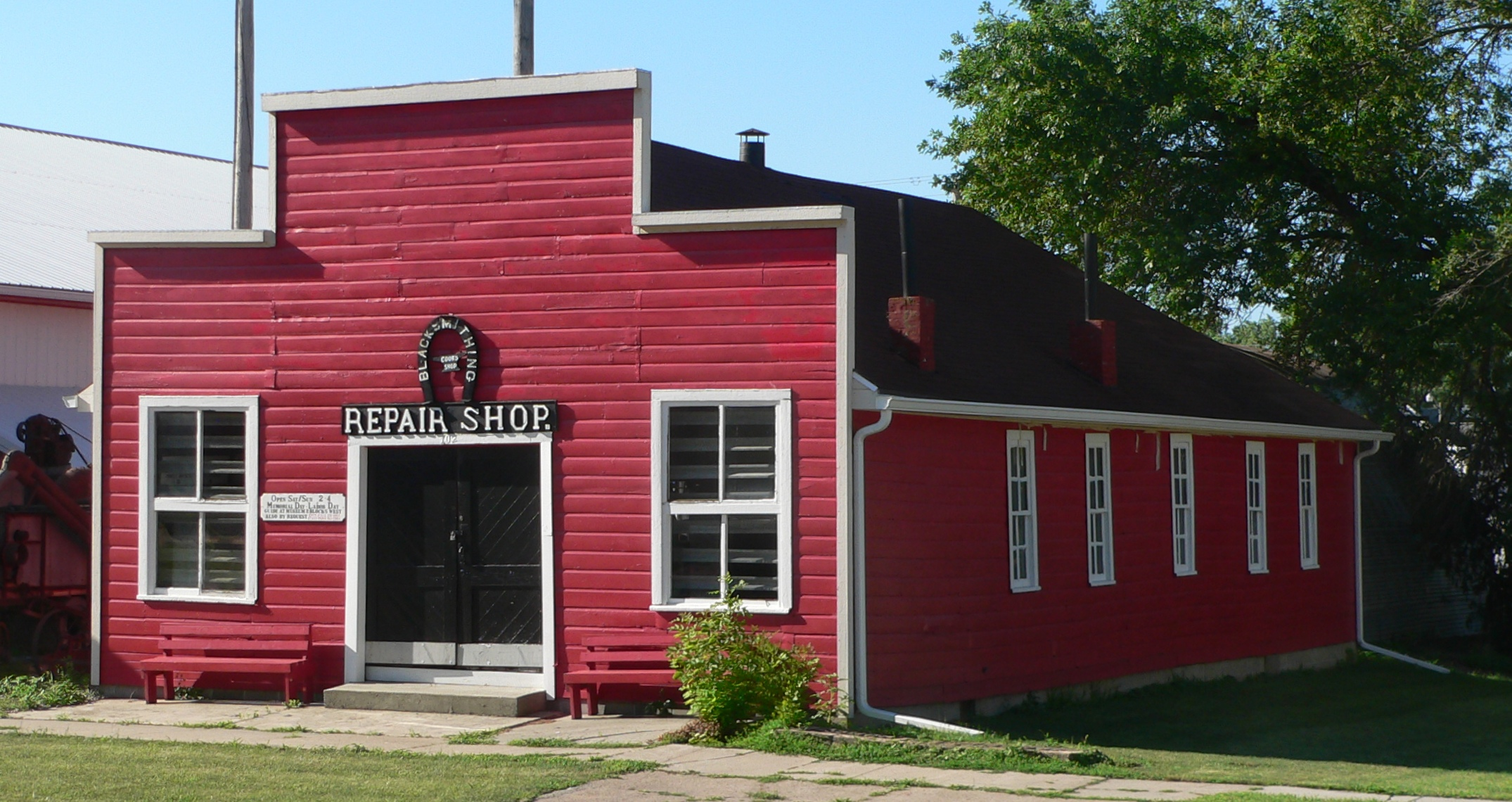

- Location within Nebraska Location within the United States
- Location: 204 3rd St., Ponca, Nebraska
- Coordinates: 42.562639°N 96.707781°W
- Built: 1901
- NRHP reference No.: 74001106

The Cook Blacksmith Shop is a former blacksmith shop in Ponca, Nebraska, United States that today is a museum.

The Cook Blacksmith Shop was built in 1901 by C. O. Cook, who operated his business for over thirty years. The building is owned by the Ponca Historical Society, which uses the shop as a living history museum. C.O. Cook Blacksmith Shop, with all its original tools and machinery, has been restored and placed in working condition.

It was listed on the National Register of Historic Places in 1974.

It is a one-story structure with a false front.
