= City Blacksmith Shop =

- U.S. National Register of Historic Places
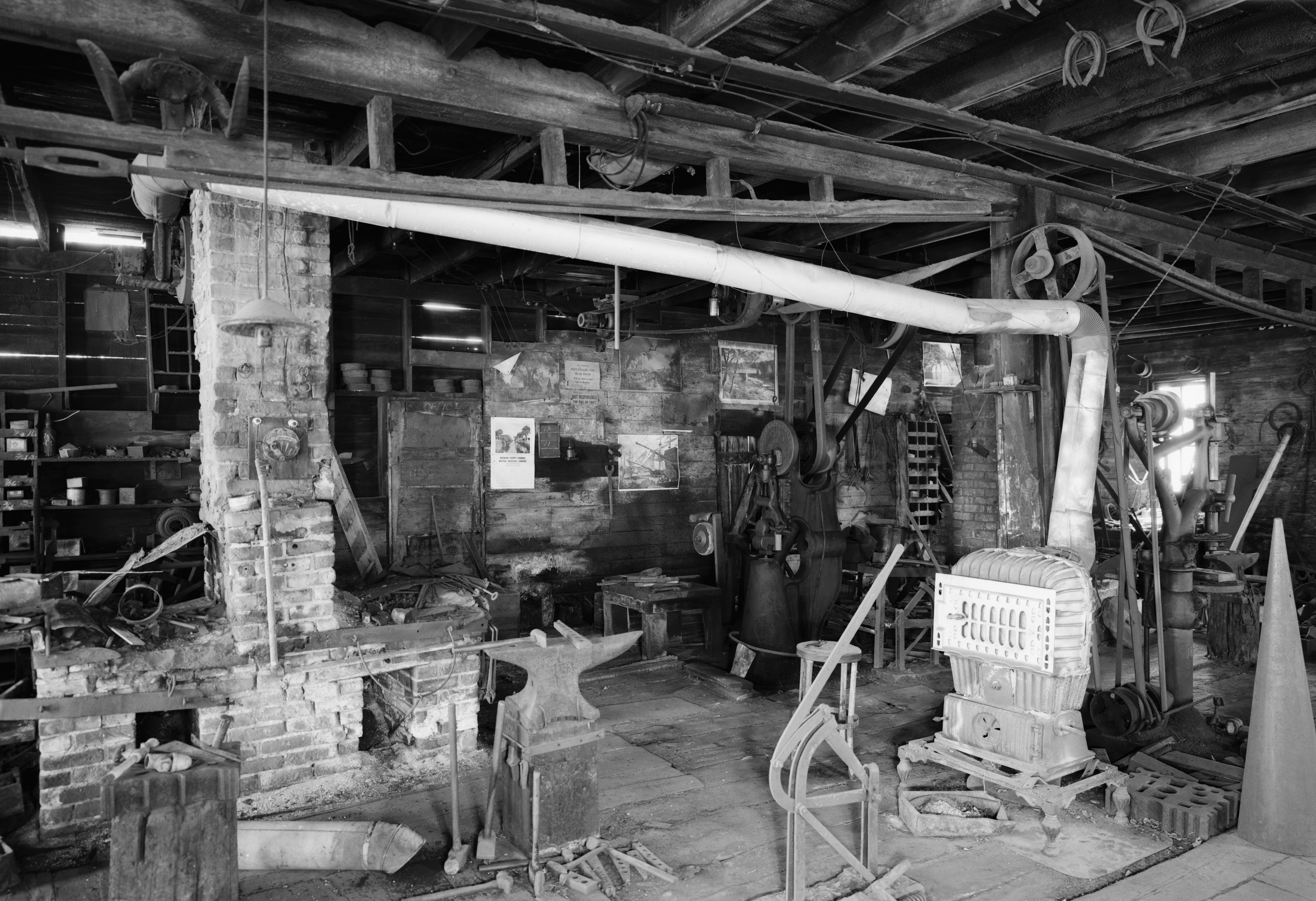

- Location within Minnesota Location within the United States
- Location: Lamberton, Minnesota
- Coordinates: 44°13′51″N 95°15′54.2″W
- Built: 1898
- MPS: Redwood County MRA
- NRHP reference No.: 80002133
- Added to NRHP: August 11, 1980

The City Blacksmith Shop or Hanzlik Blacksmith Shop in Lamberton in the U.S. state of Minnesota is located at Douglas Street and 2nd Avenue. The building was built by George Nigg Senior and Paul Schaffran in 1897. They smithed until they sold the shop to Anton Hanzlik in 1920. Many of the trade tools are still in the building, however some have been modernized with electricity.
