= A. Newton Farm =

Historic house in New York, United States

- U.S. National Register of Historic Places
- Location within New York Location within the United States
- Location: NY 180, jct. with Co. Rd. 13, Hamlet of Omar, Orleans, New York
- Coordinates: 44°15′45″N 75°58′44″W
- Area: 99.5 acres (40.3 ha)
- Built: 1870
- Architectural style: Mid 19th Century Revival
- MPS: Orleans MPS
- NRHP reference No.: 97000356
- Added to NRHP: May 5, 1997

A. Newton Farm is a historic home and farm complex located at Orleans in Jefferson County, New York. The farmhouse was built about 1870 and is a small, modest 1 1/2-story Greek Revival building with a gable front, prominent cornice returns, a northside wing, and a modern kitchen ell on the rear. Also on the property are a hay barn, blacksmith's shop, toolshed, pig barn, milk and ice house, hay and heifer barn, and horse barn.

It was listed on the National Register of Historic Places in 1997.
