= Pound, Virginia =

- Town
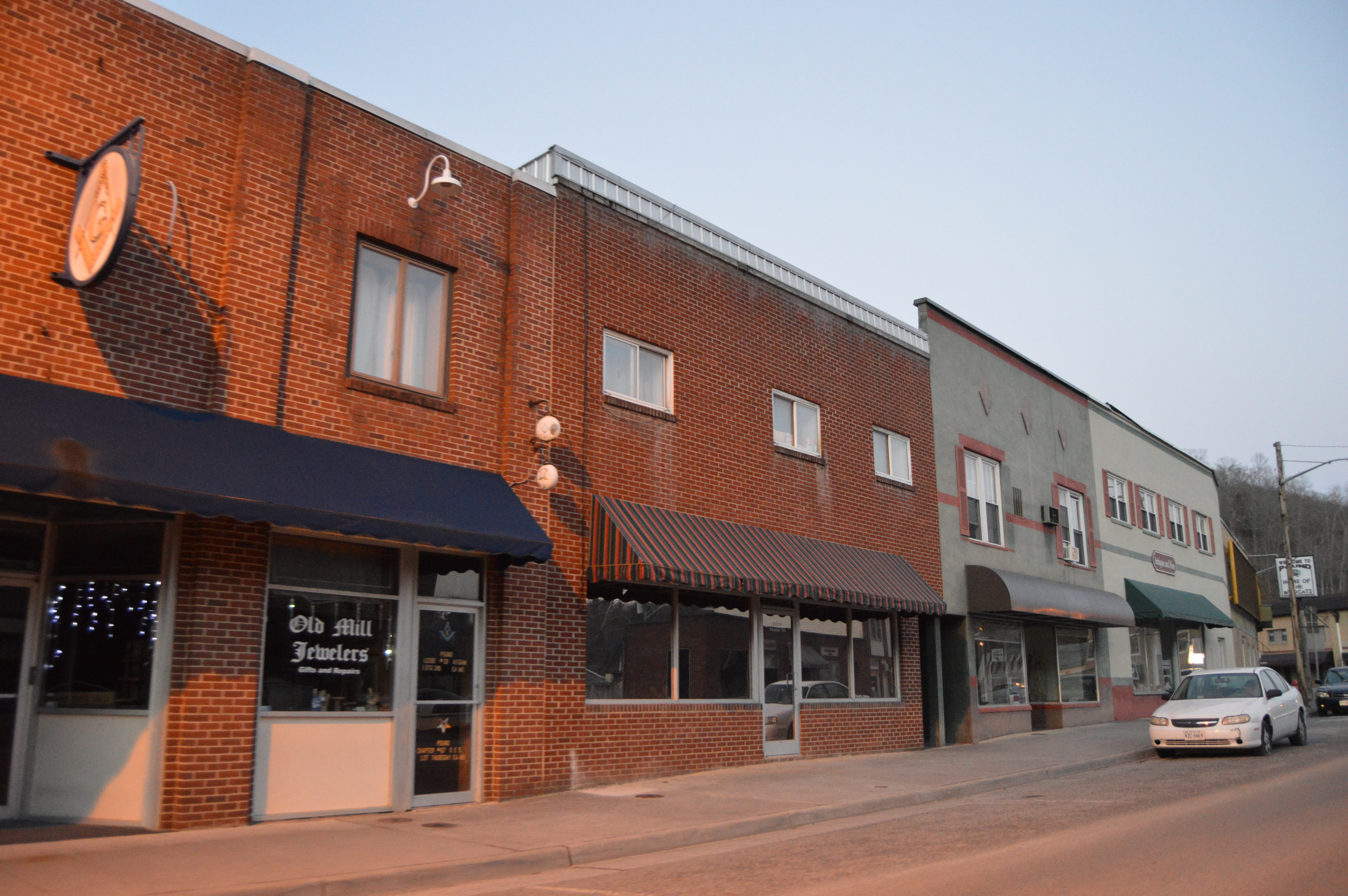
- Main Street (2017)

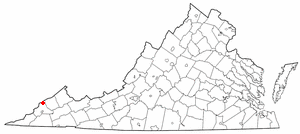
- Location in the Commonwealth of Virginia
- Coordinates: 37°7′26″N 82°36′28″W
- Country: United States
- State: Virginia
- County: Wise

Government
  - Mayor: John Cauthorne

Area
  - Total: 2.61 sq mi (6.75 km^{2})
  - Land: 2.61 sq mi (6.75 km^{2})
  - Water: 0.0039 sq mi (0.01 km^{2})
- Elevation: 1,565 ft (477 m)

Population (2020)
  - Total: 877
  - Estimate (2019): 918
  - Density: 352.3/sq mi (136.04/km^{2})
- Time zone: UTC-5 (EST)
  - Summer (DST): UTC-4 (EDT)
- ZIP code: 24279
- Area code: 276
- FIPS code: 51-64272
- GNIS ID: 1499906
- Website: poundva.gov

Pound is a town in Wise County, Virginia, United States. As of the 2020 census, Pound had a population of 877.

== History ==
The Pound area was explored in 1751 by Christopher Gist, and it is traditionally said to be the oldest settlement in Wise County. Also known as "The Pound," the name may derive from a family name, or from a pounding mill built in the area in 1815. The county's first post office was established there in 1848. Pound was not incorporated until 1950, the last town in Wise County to do so.

Historically, the town's economy benefited from the area's coal mining industry. In the 1940s, the town had nearly a dozen bars catering to miners from nearby Kentucky. As mining declined in the late twentieth and early twenty-first centuries, Pound—like much of Southwest Virginia—saw its economy and tax base collapse. Over the following decades, fiscal and political difficulties led the Virginia General Assembly to pass a law in 2022 that would revoke the town's charter in 2023 unless improvements were made. Its charter was restored on February 2, 2023.

The Flat Gap High School and Sunnydale Farm are listed on the National Register of Historic Places.

=== Notable crimes ===
On November 30, 1927, Leonard Woods, a black coal miner and resident of Jenkins, Kentucky, was lynched on the Virginia-Kentucky border in Pound. Woods had been jailed in Kentucky for the murder of 29-year-old Herschel Deaton of Coeburn, Virginia, following an altercation on November 27. On the night of the lynching, a crowd estimated between 400 and 500 surrounded the Kentucky jail Woods was held in and demanded he be released to their custody. The crowd then transported Woods to a wooden structure located in Pound adjacent to the recently constructed US 23 highway. By this time the mob, estimated at 1,500, oversaw the hanging of Woods, followed by the firing of over 500 shots at his body, according to a local reporter. Both Virginia and Kentucky authorities claimed they were not responsible for investigating the crime, and no one was prosecuted for the death of Leonard Woods.

In 1935, Pound gained national attention for the case of Edith Maxwell, who was convicted in 1935 of murdering her father, Trigg Maxwell. She was pardoned in 1941 after appeals from Eleanor Roosevelt and the Washington Post raised funds for her legal defense.

== Geography ==
Pound is located at 37°7′26″N 82°36′28″W (37.123820, -82.607859).

According to the United States Census Bureau, the town has a total area of 2.6 square miles (6.8 km^{2}), all land.

=== Climate ===
The climate in this area is characterized by relatively high temperatures and evenly distributed precipitation throughout the year. The Köppen Climate System describes the weather as humid subtropical, and uses the abbreviation Cfa.

== Demographics ==
Historical population
Census	Pop.	Note	%±
1950	1,193		—
1960	1,135		−4.9%
1970	995		−12.3%
1980	1,086		9.1%
1990	995		−8.4%
2000	1,089		9.4%
2010	1,037		−4.8%
2020	877		−15.4%
2025 (est.)	836	▼	−4.7%
U.S. Decennial Census

At the 2000 census there were 1,089 people, 455 households and 322 families in the town. The population density was 417.6 per square mile (161.1/km^{2}). There were 516 housing units at an average density of 197.9 per square mile (76.3/km^{2}). The racial makeup of the town was 98.71% White, 0.09% Native American, 0.09% from other races, and 1.10% from two or more races. Hispanic or Latino of any race were 0.18%.

Of the 455 households 31.2% had children under the age of 18 living with them, 52.5% were married couples living together, 15.8% had a female householder with no husband present, and 29.2% were non-families. 25.9% of households were one person and 14.3% were one person aged 65 or older. The average household size was 2.39 and the average family size was 2.88.

The age distribution was 24.0% under the age of 18, 8.8% from 18 to 24, 29.8% from 25 to 44, 21.5% from 45 to 64, and 16.0% 65 or older. The median age was 39 years. For every 100 females there were 87.8 males. For every 100 females aged 18 and over, there were 80.8 males.

The median income for a household in the town was $29,107, and the median family income was $33,688. Males had a median income of $32,065 versus $22,143 for females. The per capita income for the town was $14,375. About 19.4% of families and 23.0% of the population were below the poverty line, including 37.9% of those under age 18 and 9.8% of those age 65 or over.

== Government ==
The town is governed by an elected mayor and council. It employs a paid town manager, who has often been the same person as the mayor.

In 1981, the town council adopted an ordinance forbidding dancing without a permit (Section 127-138). When the town turned down a dance application, the ordinance was challenged and overturned by the federal District Court in 1999 as "unconstitutional on its face."

=== Near-revocation of charter ===
Pound was once a thriving town, with large revenues coming in from coal companies. Yet, by the 2020s, falling revenues and assertions that past wealth had not been correctly saved for lean years caused issues in the town government, which led to financial and political issues plaguing the town government, including embezzlement. The town failed to pass a budget by its deadline, closed its police department, and was required by the state government to turn over its wastewater treatment facility to Wise County. Resignations and attendance problems deprived the town council of a quorum, resulting in a judge appointing replacement members. In 2021, the county board of supervisors requested that the Virginia General Assembly revoke the town's charter, along with Delegate Terry Kilgore threatening the same after being tired of hearing about issues in the town.

In 2022, the General Assembly passed, and the Governor signed into law, a bill to revoke the charter without a local referendum, as of November 1, 2023, unless the town government sufficiently improved before then. On February 2, 2023, the General Assembly passed, and the Governor signed into law, a bill to restore the town's charter.

Before, but especially since, Kilgore's suggestion that he would push for the charter's revocation, the town has worked to repay its debts, chosen a new mayor, and replaced half of the council. Via creative grant applications and resourceful spending, the town has decreased its spending. It has also improved policing procedures and equipment and worked to revitalize the community, including with a new neighborhood watch group and increased business activity downtown. Yet, more work needs to be done on the town hall and to repair the effects of a 2015 landslide downtown. Some grant funding streams are unattainable due to past fiscal problems, and the audits, which would serve, among other things, to reassure potential funders, would be unattainably expensive for the town.

== Education ==
Pound has one public school, James Woodrow Adams Combined School, which is a part of Wise County Public Schools, which owns and operates it.

== Infrastructure ==
=== Highways ===
US 23 runs through Pound and crosses into Kentucky at Pound Gap. Pound is also the proposed connection to US 23 for the planned Coalfield Expressway.

== Flooding ==
Flooding in the region has been ongoing for many years. A flood in 1957 has been referred to as the Great Appalachian Flood of 1957, affecting southeastern Kentucky, southwestern West Virginia, western West Virginia, and northeastern Tennessee. A flood of the Appalachian region of Kentucky, Tennessee, Virginia, and West Virginia has been referred to as The Great Appalachian Flood of 1977. A flood in 2014 affected Grayson, Smyth, Tazewell, Washington, Wise, and Wythe counties. In 2022, the Indian Creek, a tributary of the Clinch River running approximately 12 miles (19 km) through the county, and Pound River, flooded. The area was inundated with around five feet of water. A February 2025 flood affected the southwest Virginia region including Wise, Russell, Lee, Buchanan, Scott and Dickenson counties to include many communities. All the affected counties declared a State of emergency and the Virginia National Guard was sent to the area. Flooding caused impassable roads, damaged roads, as well as flooded and damaged bridges. Virginia Governor Glenn Youngkin, when asking for a declaration of emergency from President Donald Trump, stated that it was the fifth major flood in the past five years and it was listed as the worse in the commonwealth since 1977.

== Places of interest ==
- Jefferson National Forest
- North Fork Pound Reservoir
- Pound Gap

== Notable people ==
- Sean Brock - Chef
- Napoleon Hill - Author and motivational speaker, born in Pound in 1883
- Edith Maxwell - American woman convicted and later pardoned of murder
- Tony Mullins - Songwriter
- Glenn Roberts - Professional Basketball Player
- Francis Gary Powers - CIA pilot best known for his role in the 1960 U-2 incident
