= Forest Park Museum and Arboretum =

Museum and arboretum near Perry, Iowa

Coordinates: 41.8261°N 94.0879°W

- Website: Official website

Forest Park Museum and Arboretum is a 17-acre (69,000 m^{2}) museum and arboretum located near Perry, Iowa. It is open year-round on weekdays and weekends April 1 to Nov 1st from 1:00 pm to 4:30 pm. There is no admission fee.

The museum and arboretum were originally developed on 5 acres (20,000 m^{2}) in the 1940s by Eugene Hastie, a farmer and local historian of Dallas County. He planted his arboretum in straight lines to allow farming between the trees, and in 1953 opened his museum to the public. In 1966, the Dallas County Conservation Department purchased the site, and has subsequently added another 12 acres (49,000 m^{2}) of re-established prairie and wildflowers. The museum displays unique artifacts; including a presidential autograph collection, a high quality Iowa book collection and the giant electrical generator built by noted inventor Henry Nelson. Live animals and an increasing number of hands on family exhibits are also featured at the facility.

The arboretum contains over 100 species of primarily native trees and shrubs.

Permanent museum displays include the last one-room school house of Dallas County (built 1867, closed 1961), a 1860s cabin, early transportation and railroading memorabilia, farm machinery, small hand tools, and a blacksmith shop.

== See also ==
- List of botanical gardens in the United States
