= Vaughn's Hall and Blacksmith Shop =

- U.S. National Register of Historic Places
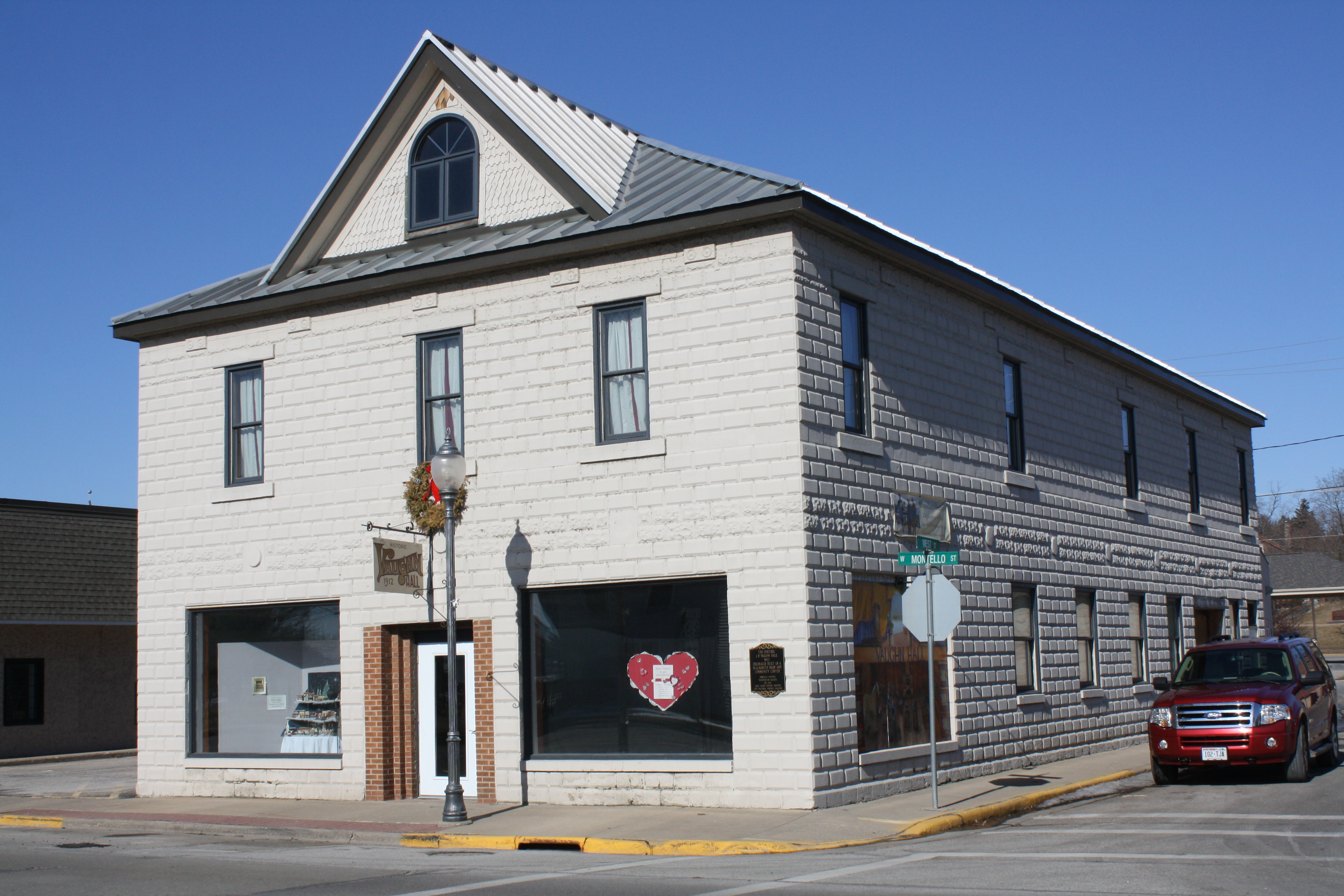
- Vaughn's Hall and Blacksmith Shop, Montello, Wisconsin, February 2012

- Location within Wisconsin Location within the United States
- Location: 55 W. Montello St., Montello, Wisconsin
- Coordinates: 43°47′31″N 89°19′46″W
- Built: 1912
- Architect: Ben Neck & Bros.
- Architectural style: Colonial Revival
- NRHP reference No.: 07000556
- Added to NRHP: June 12, 2007

The Vaughn's Hall and Blacksmith Shop is a building in Montello, Wisconsin, United States, listed on the National Register of Historic Places. The two-story cement block building was built by a blacksmith named John P. Vaughn in 1912. The new cast concrete blocks were manufactured in Montello at Neck and Brothers manufacturing site.

The building was used as a blacksmith shop with a community hall upstairs. The second floor grand opening ball on June 28, 1912 featured the Lyric Harp Orchestra.

Later, the building was used as a garage, a car dealership, a hardware store, and is now home of the Montello Museum.

In 2001, on the eve of demolition, Vaughn Hall was saved by a group of citizens dedicated to preserving Montello's history and a conscientious community who donated the building to the Montello Historic Preservation Society.
