= Hayse Blacksmith Shop =

- U.S. National Register of Historic Places
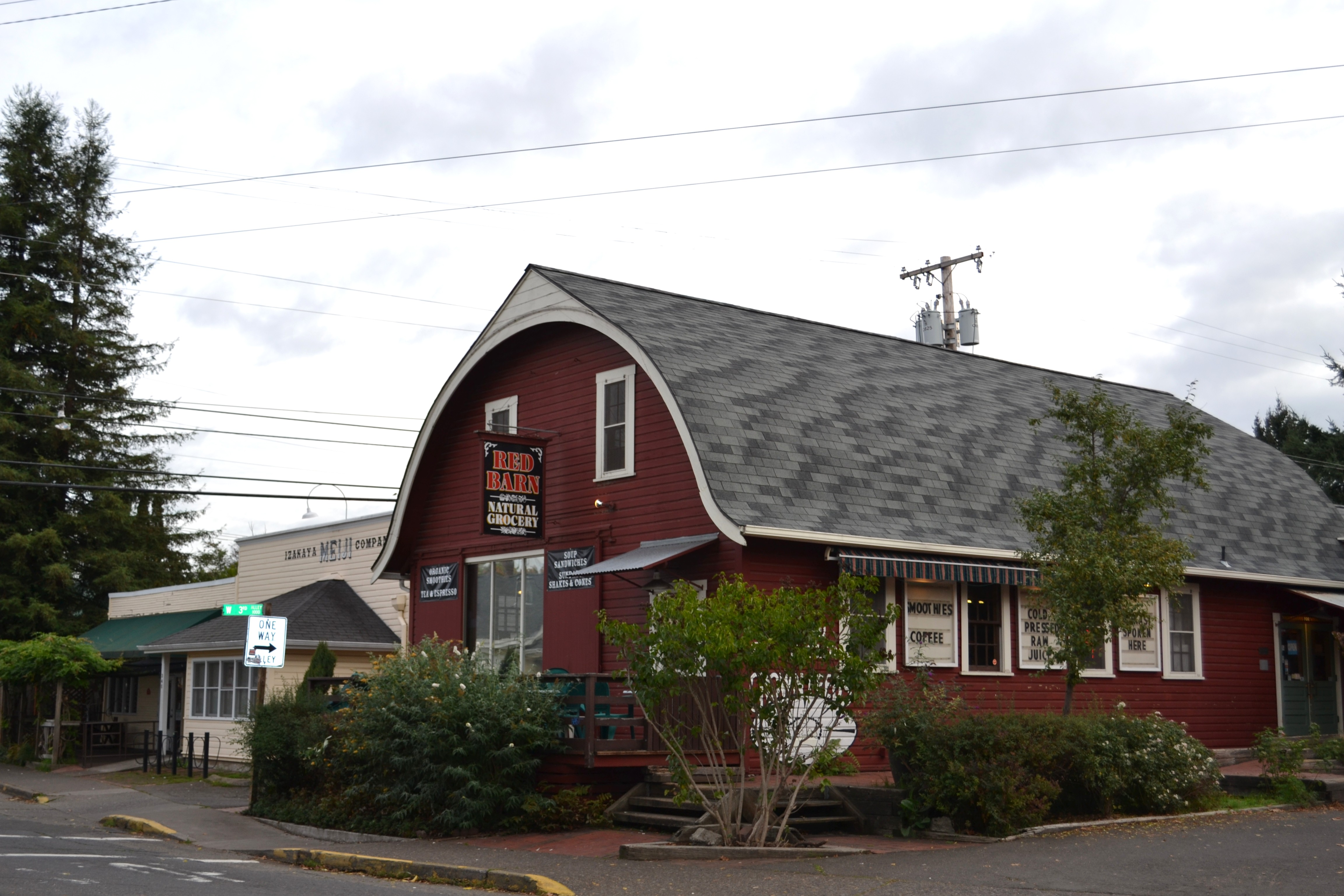
- The building in 2011

- Location within Oregon Location within the United States
- Location: 357 Van Buren St., Eugene, Oregon
- Coordinates: 44°03′21″N 123°06′29″W
- Area: less than one acre
- Built: 1914
- Built by: C.O. Stratton and son
- Architectural style: Round roof barn
- NRHP reference No.: 80003335
- Added to NRHP: November 7, 1980

The Hayse Blacksmith Shop, located in Eugene, Oregon, is listed on the National Register of Historic Places.

The building is now occupied by Red Barn Natural Grocery, an independent grocery store and deli.

== See also ==
- National Register of Historic Places listings in Lane County, Oregon
