= Reiff Farm =

- U.S. National Register of Historic Places
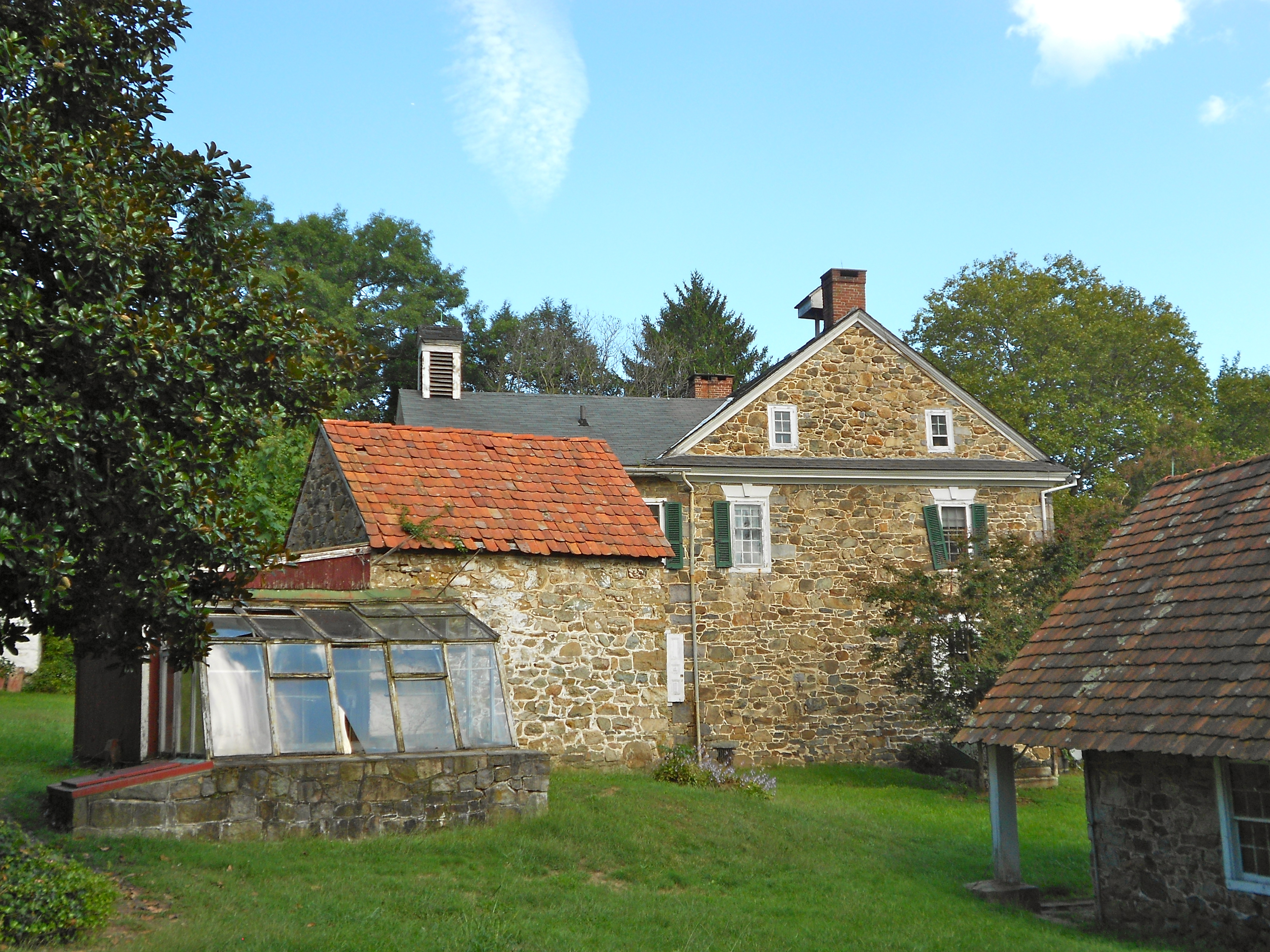
- House and outbuilding

- Location within Pennsylvania Location within the United States
- Location: Southwest of Oley on Township 454, Oley Township, Pennsylvania
- Coordinates: 40°22′55″N 75°48′30″W
- Area: less than one acre
- Built by: Reiff, Conrad, III
- Architectural style: Georgian
- NRHP reference No.: 82003759
- Added to NRHP: February 25, 1982

The Reiff Farm is an historic home and farm complex that is located in Oley Township, Berks County, Pennsylvania, United States.

It was listed on the National Register of Historic Places in 1982.

== History and architectural features ==
The main farmhouse is a 2 1/2-story, five-bay by two-bay, Georgian-style dwelling built from fieldstone. The property includes a 2 1/2-story, log house that may have been built between 1742 and 1800, but possibly as early as 1709, along with a variety of outbuildings. Outbuildings include an implement shed and workshop, a pig barn, a combination spring house and smokehouse, a summer kitchen and bake oven, an ice house, and a combination butcher shop and blacksmith shop (1742). Six of the outbuildings have red clay tile roofs.

== Gallery ==
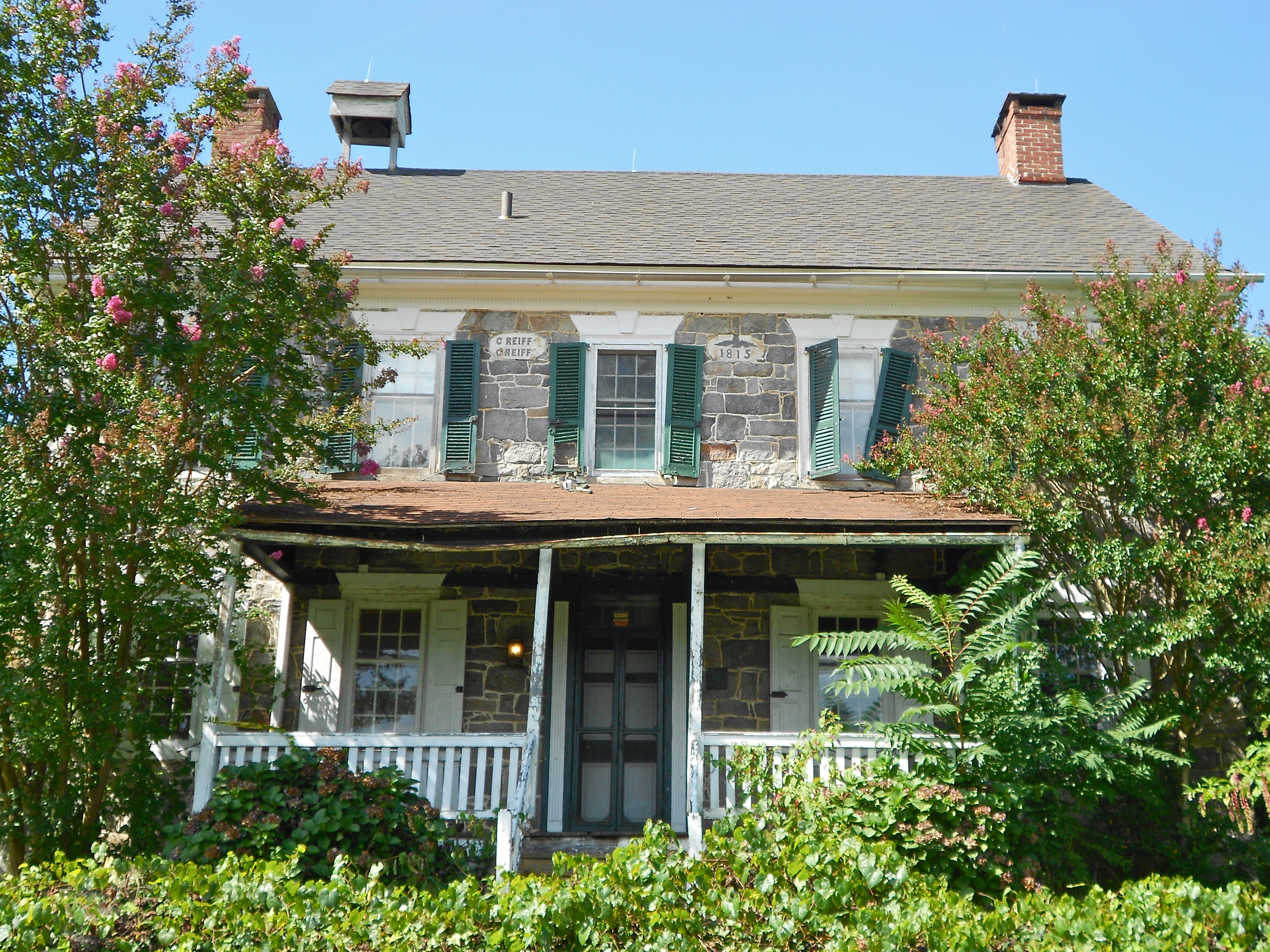
Main house
