= Fugal Blacksmith Shop =

- U.S. National Register of Historic Places
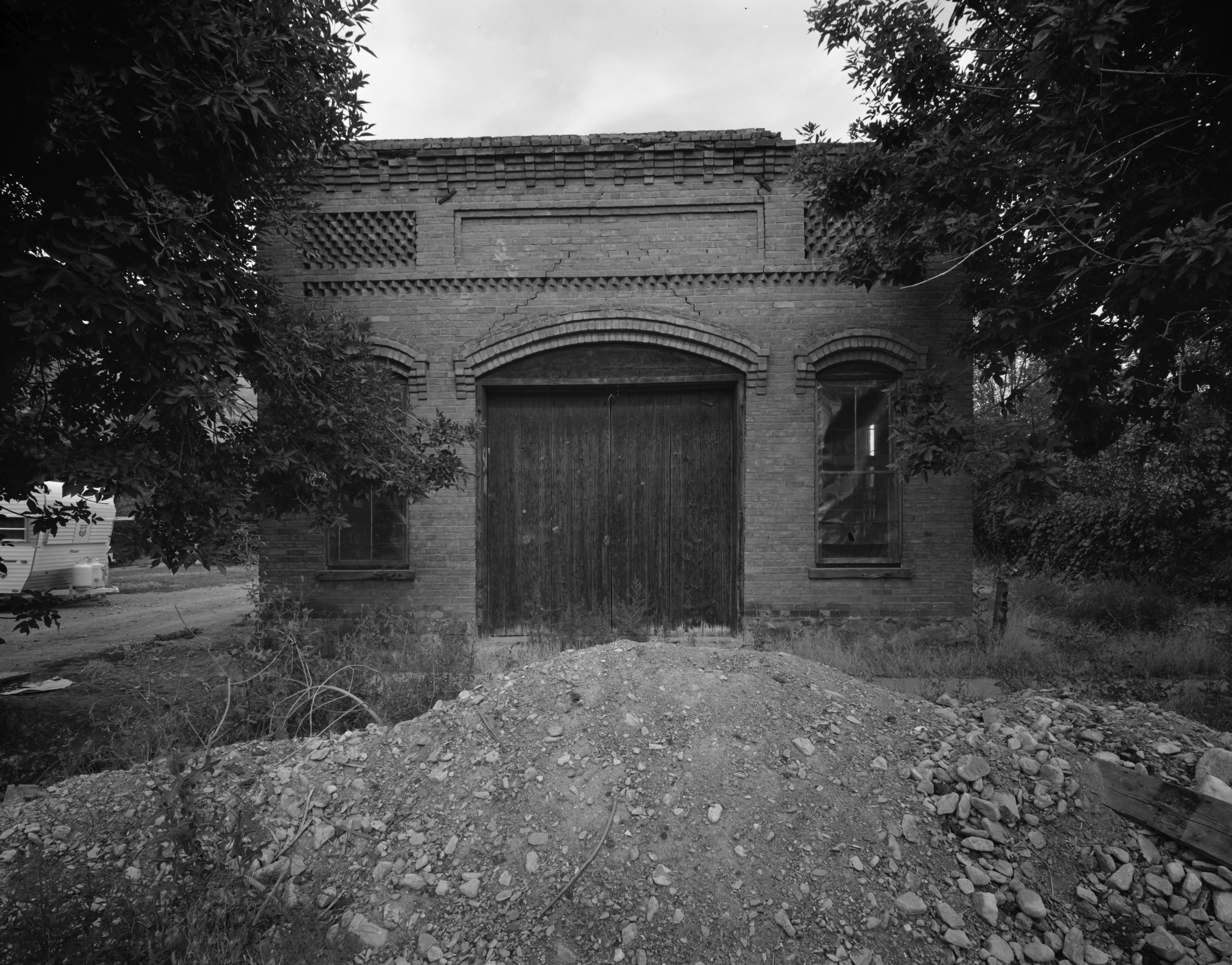
- The Fugal Blacksmith Shop, August 1968

- Location within Utah Location within the United States
- Location: Approximately 680 North 400 East; Pleasant Grove, Utah; United States
- Coordinates: 40°22′15″N 111°43′54″W
- Area: less than one acre
- Built: 1903
- Architectural style: Late Victorian
- NRHP reference No.: 94000297
- Added to NRHP: April 7, 1994

The Fugal Blacksmith Shop is a structure in Pleasant Grove, Utah, United States, that is listed on the National Register of Historic Places.

== Description ==
The shop, located at approximately 680 North 400 East, was built in 1903. It served as the only blacksmith shop in Pleasant Grove during 1926-1962 after the other two converted into automobile garages.

The shop was listed on the National Register of Historic Places April 7, 1994.

== See also ==
- National Register of Historic Places listings in Utah County, Utah
- Fugal Dugout House, also NRHP-listed in Pleasant Grove
