= Svenson Blacksmith Shop =

- U.S. National Register of Historic Places
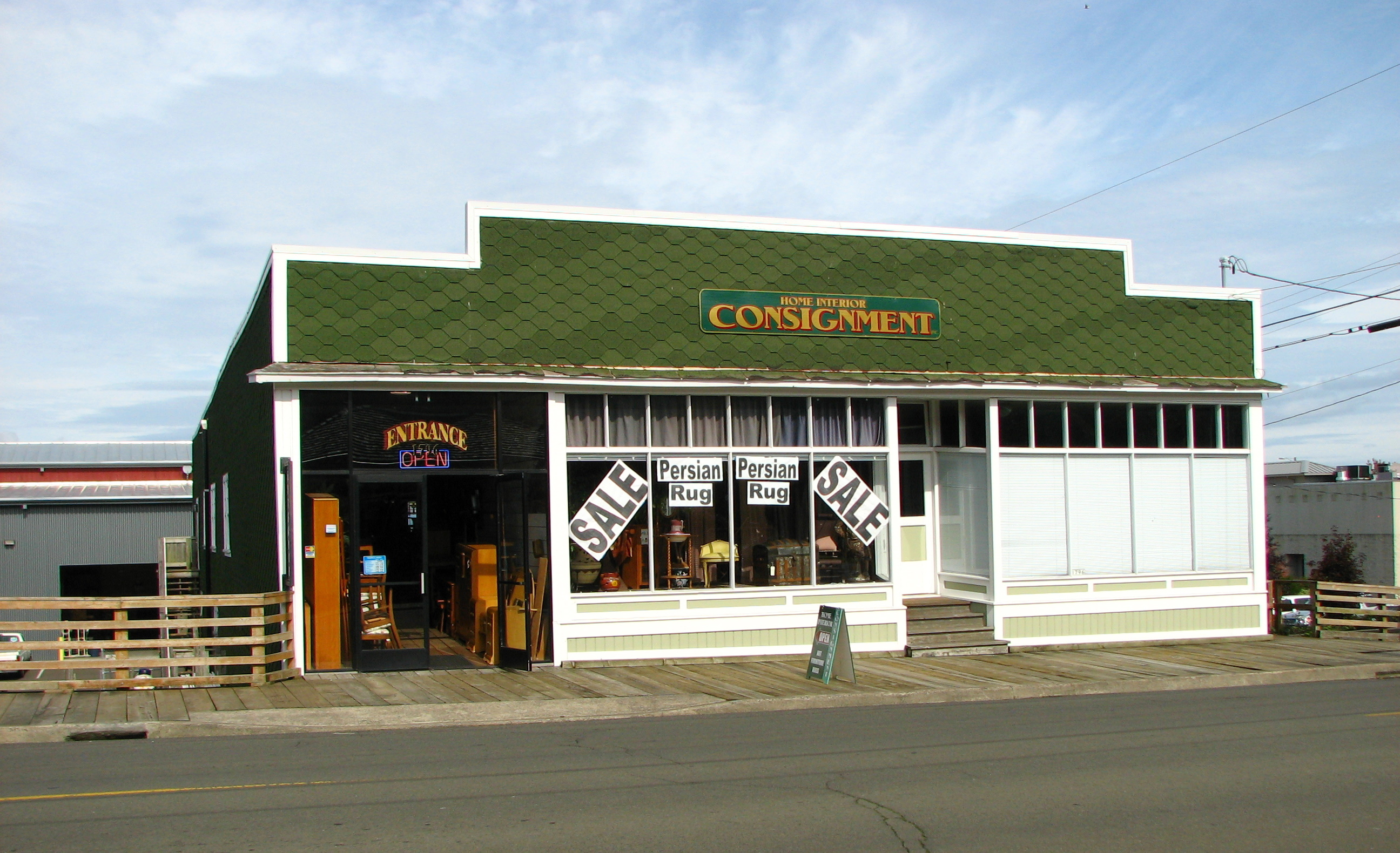
- The building's exterior in 2010

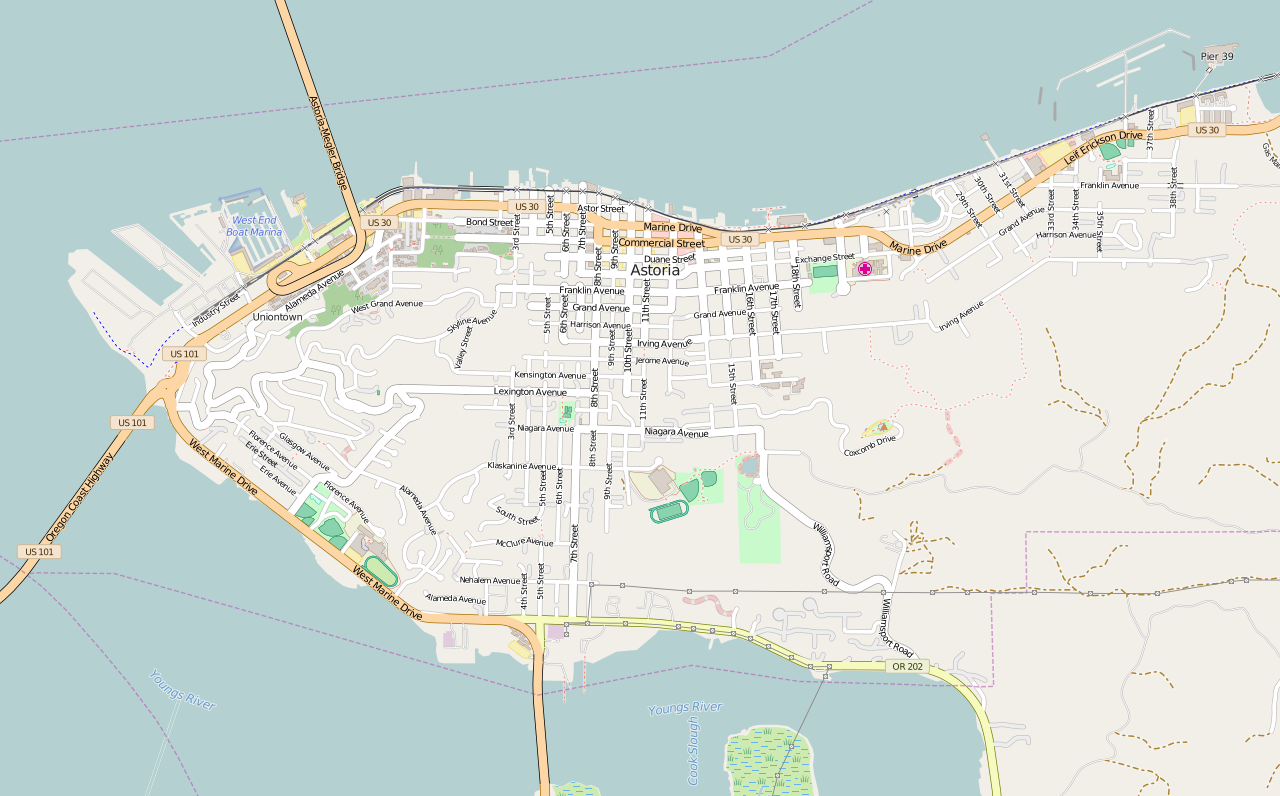
- Location within Astoria OR
- Location: 1769 Exchange Street; Astoria, Oregon
- Coordinates: 46°11′19″N 123°49′23″W
- Area: Less than 1 acre (0.40 ha)
- Built: 1920
- Built by: C. S. Cato
- Architectural style: Vernacular Commercial style
- NRHP reference No.: 86003015
- Added to NRHP: November 6, 1986

The Svenson Blacksmith Shop is a historic commercial building in Astoria, Oregon, United States.

It was listed on the National Register of Historic Places in 1986.

== See also ==
- National Register of Historic Places listings in Clatsop County, Oregon
