= Wiley, Colorado =

Town in Prowers County, Colorado, United States

- Town
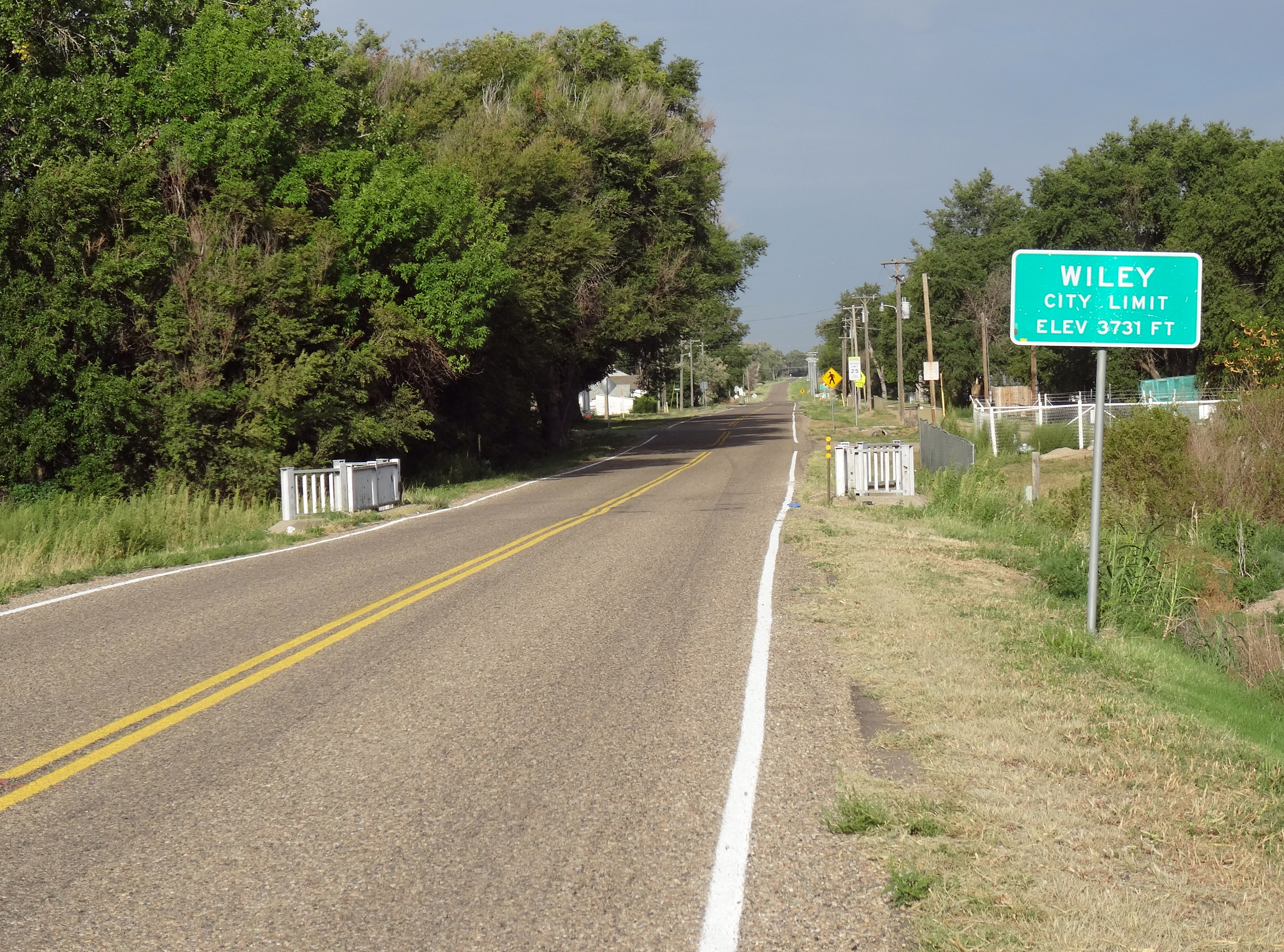
- Wiley from the east (2013)

- Location with Prowers County and Colorado
- Coordinates: 38°9′19.17″N 102°43′9.06″W
- Country: United States
- State: Colorado
- County: Prowers
- Incorporated: January 28, 1909

Area
  - Total: 0.31 sq mi (0.81 km^{2})
  - Land: 0.31 sq mi (0.81 km^{2})
  - Water: 0 sq mi (0 km^{2})
- Elevation: 3,740 ft (1,140 m)

Population (2020)
  - Total: 437
  - Density: 1,400/sq mi (540/km^{2})
- Time zone: UTC−7 (MST)
  - Summer (DST): UTC−6 (MDT)
- ZIP Code: 81092
- Area code: 719
- FIPS code: 08-85045
- GNIS ID: 2413488
- Website: townofwiley.gov

Wiley is a statutory town in Prowers County, Colorado, United States. The population was 437 at the 2020 Census.

== Description ==
A post office called Wiley has been in operation since 1907. The community was named after W. M. Wiley, the president of Holly Sugar Company.

== Geography ==
According to the United States Census Bureau, the town has a total area of 0.3 square miles (0.78 km^{2}), all of it land.

== Demographics ==
Historical population
Census	Pop.	Note	%±
1910	197		—
1920	565		186.8%
1930	589		4.2%
1940	413		−29.9%
1950	417		1.0%
1960	383		−8.2%
1970	357		−6.8%
1980	425		19.0%
1990	406		−4.5%
2000	483		19.0%
2010	405		−16.1%
2020	437		7.9%
U.S. Decennial Census

As of the census of 2010, there were 405 people, 162 households, and 112 families residing in the town. The population density was 1,384.4 inhabitants per square mile (534.5/km^{2}). There were 196 housing units at an average density of 558.9 units per square mile (215.8 units/km^{2}). The racial makeup of the town was 83% White, 0.7% African American, 0% Native American, 0.5% Asian, 13.8% from other races, and 1.7% from two or more races. Hispanic or Latino of any race were 25.2% of the population.

There were 162 households, out of which 35.8% had children under the age of 18 living with them, 51.2% were married couples living together, 10.5% had a female householder with no husband present, and 30.9% were non-families. 27.8% of all households were made up of individuals, and 17.9% had someone living alone who was 65 years of age or older. The average household size was 2.5 and the average family size was 3.11.

In the town, the population was spread out, with 31.1% under the age of 18, 8.9% from 18 to 24, 34.0% from 25 to 44, 16.6% from 45 to 64, and 9.5% who were 65 years of age or older. The median age was 32 years. For every 100 females, there were 90.2 males. For every 100 females age 18 and over, there were 91.4 males.

The median income for a household in the town was $30,294, and the median income for a family was $32,143. Males had a median income of $30,156 versus $18,750 for females. The per capita income for the town was $13,115. About 13.1% of families and 20.2% of the population were below the poverty line, including 26.2% of those under age 18 and 16.7% of those age 65 or over.

== Transportation ==
Highway: Wiley is 0.2 miles east of U.S. Highway 287.

Rail: (Historical information) Wiley was once served by the Arkansas Valley subdivision of the Acheson, Topeka and Santa Fe railway.

== See also ==
- List of municipalities in Colorado
