= Cleveland's Hall and Blacksmith Shop =

- U.S. National Register of Historic Places
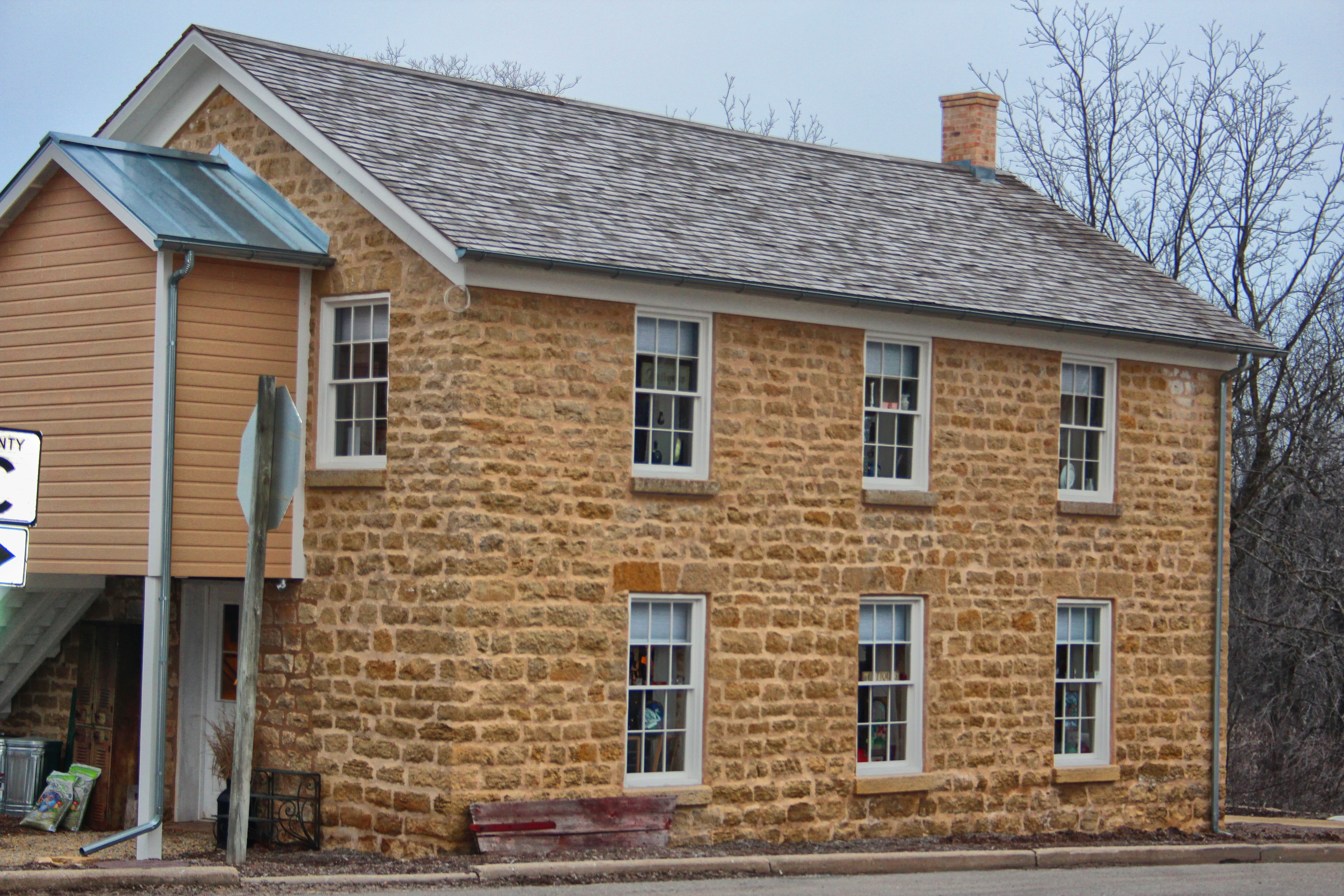
- Location: N7302 County Trunk Hwy. X Attica, Wisconsin
- Coordinates: 42.77014°N 89.48084°W
- Built: 1873
- NRHP reference No.: 09001220
- Added to NRHP: January 7, 2010

Cleveland's Hall and Blacksmith Shop is a highly intact two-story workshop and meeting hall at the rural crossroad of Attica, Wisconsin, in the town Brooklyn, Green County, Wisconsin, USA. It was added to the National Register of Historic Places in 2010.

Probably constructed around 1873, the structure was built by blacksmith David C. Heathman, facing onto Attica's Main Street, which is now County X. Norwegian immigrant blacksmith Benjamin Cleveland bought it in 1883 and converted the second story to a dance hall and meeting space, calling it 'Cleveland's Hall'. Around 1899 the Attica lodge of the Modern Woodmen of America bought the building. They continued to use the upper story as their meeting hall, but the first story transitioned from the blacksmith shop to a feed store and a garage.

Heathman built his shop much as it appears today. The walls are of gold-tinted limestone. The side facing the Sugar River is uncoursed stone; the other sides are coursed. Heathman built the front door large enough to admit a workhorse for shoeing. The door and some windows have dressed stone sills and lintels. Before 1900 a wooden porch ran across the front of the building, open on the first story and enclosed on the second. By 1908 the Woodmen had removed the early porch and added a Boomtown-style facade. They also added a wooden addition on the north side, but that has been removed.

Inside, the first floor is a single room. It originally had a dirt floor, but that has been replaced with poured concrete. In the south wall is a timber with iron rings which were used to tie up horses while they were being shod. A wooden staircase leads up to the second story, which consists of one meeting room with a tongue-and-groove wooden floor and plastered walls.

With transportation difficult in early Wisconsin, the rural blacksmith was important to nearby farmers, both for keeping horses and equipment in order and for forging tools. Attica already had a blacksmith, Lorenzo Barnes, in 1845, long before Heathman built the surviving shop in 1873.

In 1897 Cleveland ran an announcement in the Albany Vindicator which gives a sense of the man:

I have rented J.S. Smith's blacksmith shop and will do all kinds of general blacksmithing. I have made a great study of horse-shoeing, am a great lover of horses and will not torture them by doing a bad job of shoeing. We know that there is a great difference between putting a horse's foot on irons and on a block of wood. There is a great art in horse-shoeing. I have heard farmers say that such a man did a good job of shoeing because the shoes stayed on a good many months; but at the same time those shoes may have been a great injury to the horse. Horse's heels do not contract all at once. I learned plow-work at Thompson's shop, in Beloit, where I learned my trade. I can harden a plowshare as hard as it can be hardened at any factory, and all my work is warranted.
