= National Register of Historic Places listings in Lane County, Oregon =

Location of Lane County in Oregon

This list presents the full set of buildings, structures, objects, sites, or districts designated on the National Register of Historic Places in Lane County, Oregon, United States, and offers brief descriptive information about each of them. The National Register recognizes places of national, state, or local historic significance across the United States. Out of over 90,000 National Register sites nationwide, Oregon is home to over 2,000, and 138 of those are found partially or wholly in Lane County.

This National Park Service list is complete through NPS recent listings posted May 1, 2026.

== Current listings ==
	Name on the Register	Image	Date listed	Location	City or town	Description
1	Alpha Phi Sorority House	Alpha Phi Sorority House	October 24, 1991 (#91001564)	1050 Hilyard St. 44°02′53″N 123°04′52″W	Eugene	
2	Alpha Tau Omega Fraternity House (Old)	Alpha Tau Omega Fraternity House (Old)	September 1, 1983 (#83002158)	1143 Oak St. 44°02′50″N 123°05′23″W	Eugene	
3	Archeological site 35LA1		September 10, 1997 (#97001014)	Address restricted		
4	Archeological site 35LA2		September 10, 1997 (#97001016)	Address restricted		
5	Archeological site 35LA4		September 10, 1997 (#97001018)	Address restricted		
6	Archeological site 35LA5		September 10, 1997 (#97001019)	Address restricted		
7	Archeological site 35LA6		September 10, 1997 (#97001020)	Address restricted		
8	Archeological site 35LA7		September 10, 1997 (#97001021)	Address restricted		
9	Archeological Site 35LA11		September 10, 1997 (#97001025)	Address restricted		
10	Archeological Site 35LA13		September 10, 1997 (#97001026)	Address restricted		
11	Archeological Site 35LA16		September 10, 1997 (#97001027)	Address restricted		
12	Archeological Site 35LA227		September 10, 1997 (#97001024)	Address restricted		
13	Archeological site 35LA228		September 10, 1997 (#97001015)	Address restricted		
14	Ax Billy Department Store	Ax Billy Department Store	August 26, 1982 (#82003731)	E. 10th Ave. and Willamette St. 44°02′56″N 123°05′28″W	Eugene	Occupied by the Downtown Athletic Club, Conference Center, and the Ax Billy Grill & Sports Bar
15	Baldwin Market	Baldwin Market	May 29, 1996 (#96000619)	765–781 Monroe St. 44°03′05″N 123°06′17″W	Eugene	
16	Abraham and Phoebe Ball House	Abraham and Phoebe Ball House	November 21, 2003 (#03001181)	1312 Lincoln St. 44°02′44″N 123°05′46″W	Eugene	
17	Belknap Bridge	Belknap Bridge	November 29, 1979 (#79002097)	Off SR 126; 44°10′06″N 122°13′37″W	Rainbow	
18	Edwin E. Benedict House	Edwin E. Benedict House	October 18, 1979 (#79002090)	East of Florence on Cox Island; 43°58′31″N 124°04′01″W	Florence	
19	Beta Theta Pi Fraternity House, Old	Beta Theta Pi Fraternity House, Old	October 30, 1989 (#89001858)	379–381 E. 12th Ave. 44°02′49″N 123°05′08″W	Eugene	
20	Big Creek Bridge No. 01180	Big Creek Bridge No. 01180	August 5, 2005 (#05000819)	OR Coast 9, US 101, MP175.02; 44°10′28″N 124°06′51″W	Heceta Head	
21	The Big "O"	The Big "O"	September 23, 2010 (#10000800)	Skinner Butte; 44°03′28″N 123°05′34″W	Eugene	
22	Bob Creek Site 35LA10		September 10, 1997 (#97001023)	Address restricted		
23	Clarence and Ethel Boyer House	Clarence and Ethel Boyer House	February 25, 2009 (#09000061)	1138 E. 22nd Ave. 44°02′07″N 123°04′32″W	Eugene	
24	Windsor W. Calkins House	Windsor W. Calkins House	December 9, 1981 (#81000498)	588 E. 11th Ave. 44°02′51″N 123°04′58″W	Eugene	
25	Robert E. Campbell House	Robert E. Campbell House	November 1, 1979 (#79002088)	890 Aspen Dr. 44°03′14″N 123°02′31″W	Springfield	
26	Cape Creek Bridge No. 01113	Cape Creek Bridge No. 01113	August 5, 2005 (#05000820)	OR Coast 9, US101, MP178.35; 44°08′01″N 124°07′14″W	Heceta Head	
27	Chambers Bridge	Chambers Bridge	November 29, 1979 (#79002081)	S. River Rd. 43°47′22″N 123°04′11″W	Cottage Grove	
28	Frank L. and Ida H. Chambers House	Frank L. and Ida H. Chambers House	September 14, 1987 (#87001537)	1006 Taylor St. 44°02′56″N 123°06′47″W	Eugene	
29	Fred E. Chambers House and Grounds	Fred E. Chambers House and Grounds	September 27, 1996 (#96001047)	1151 Irving Rd. 44°06′14″N 123°09′10″W	Eugene	
30	Chase Gardens Residential Grouping	Chase Gardens Residential Grouping	August 5, 1999 (#99000943)	274 S. Garden Way; 44°03′32″N 123°03′06″W	Eugene	
31	Chi Psi Fraternity House	Chi Psi Fraternity House	March 18, 1993 (#91001563)	1018 Hilyard St. 44°02′55″N 123°04′52″W	Eugene	
32	Daniel and Catherine Christian House^{†}	Daniel and Catherine Christian House	January 29, 2008 (#07001507)	170 E. 12th Ave. 44°02′47″N 123°05′20″W	Eugene	
33	Christian-Patterson Rental Property	Christian-Patterson Rental Property	October 24, 1991 (#91001567)	244 E. 16th Ave. 44°02′32″N 123°05′16″W	Eugene	
34	Jacob Clearwater House	Jacob Clearwater House	July 3, 2017 (#100001273)	1656 Clearwater Lane; 44°01′35″N 122°57′04″W	Springfield	
35	Coburg Historic District	Coburg Historic District	January 7, 1986 (#86000036)	Roughly bounded by Van Duyn Rd., Diamond and Miller Sts., Dixon St. and Tax lots 1700 and 201, and Bottom Loop Rd. 44°08′22″N 123°03′57″W	Coburg	
36	Cochran-Rice Farm Complex	Cochran-Rice Farm Complex	October 17, 1991 (#91001558)	993 N. Lane St. 43°48′19″N 123°03′09″W	Cottage Grove	Dismantled in 2012.
37	Cottage Grove Armory	Cottage Grove Armory	March 7, 2012 (#12000081)	628 E. Washington Avenue; 43°47′48″N 123°03′41″W	Cottage Grove	
38	Cottage Grove Downtown Commercial Historic District	Cottage Grove Downtown Commercial Historic District	January 28, 1994 (#93001568)	Area surrounding Main St. between Coast Fork Willamette R. and Ninth St. 43°47′51″N 123°03′38″W	Cottage Grove	
39	Coyote Creek Bridge	Coyote Creek Bridge	November 29, 1979 (#79002084)	Southeast of Crow; 43°58′12″N 123°19′08″W	Crow	
40	Creswell Public Library and Civic Improvement Club Clubhouse	Creswell Public Library and Civic Improvement Club Clubhouse	January 29, 2008 (#07001508)	195 S. 2nd St. 43°54′59″N 123°01′13″W	Creswell	
41	Currin Bridge	Currin Bridge	November 29, 1979 (#79002082)	East of Cottage Grove; 43°47′37″N 122°59′43″W	Cottage Grove	
42	Dads' Gates	Dads' Gates	August 11, 2004 (#04000829)	11th Ave. E. bet. Kincaid St. and Franklin Blvd. 44°02′52″N 123°04′35″W	Eugene	
43	Deadwood Creek Bridge	Deadwood Creek Bridge	November 29, 1979 (#79002099)	Northeast of Swisshome; 44°08′37″N 123°43′13″W	Swisshome	
44	Deady Hall	Deady Hall	April 11, 1972 (#72001082)	University of Oregon campus 44°02′48″N 123°04′31″W	Eugene	Now known as University Hall
45	Devil's Elbow Site (35LA17)		September 10, 1997 (#97001028)	Address restricted		
46	Dorena Bridge	Dorena Bridge	November 29, 1979 (#79002086)	Northwest of Dorena; 43°44′14″N 122°53′01″W	Dorena	
47	Dorris Apartments	Dorris Apartments	October 24, 1991 (#91001565)	963 Ferry Ln. 44°02′57″N 123°05′00″W	Eugene	
48	Dorris Ranch	Dorris Ranch	June 22, 1988 (#88000724)	S. Second St. at Dorris Ave. 44°01′41″N 123°01′02″W	Springfield	
49	Benjamin Franklin Dorris House	Benjamin Franklin Dorris House	February 23, 1996 (#96000171)	707 E. 17th Ave. 44°02′29″N 123°04′51″W	Eugene	
50	East Skinner Butte Historic District	East Skinner Butte Historic District	September 23, 1982 (#82003732)	Pearl and High Sts., and 2nd and 3rd Aves. 44°03′25″N 123°05′17″W	Eugene	
51	Ernest Bridge	Ernest Bridge	November 29, 1979 (#79002094)	Northeast of Marcola; 44°12′04″N 122°50′10″W	Marcola	
52	Eugene Blair Boulevard Commercial Historic District	Eugene Blair Boulevard Commercial Historic District	September 21, 1993 (#93000928)	Blair Blvd. between W. 3rd and W. 5th Aves., including Van Buren St. between Blair and W. 3rd 44°03′20″N 123°06′30″W	Eugene	
53	Eugene Hotel	Eugene Hotel	October 7, 1982 (#82001508)	222 E. Broadway; 44°02′59″N 123°05′21″W	Eugene	Built in 1925; Americanized-Spanish architecture.
54	Eugene Pioneer Cemetery	Eugene Pioneer Cemetery	August 1, 1997 (#97000850)	Jct. of E. Eighteenth Ave. and University St. 44°02′30″N 123°04′30″W	Eugene	
55	First Congregational Church	First Congregational Church	February 12, 1980 (#80003333)	492 E. 13th Ave. 44°02′43″N 123°05′08″W	Eugene	
56	First Presbyterian Church	First Presbyterian Church	December 31, 1974 (#74001690)	216 S. 3rd St. 43°47′42″N 123°03′48″W	Cottage Grove	
57	Charles C. Fitch Farmstead	Charles C. Fitch Farmstead	June 16, 1989 (#89000510)	26689 Pickens Rd. 44°01′47″N 123°16′51″W	Eugene	
58	Flanagan Site (35 LA 218)		July 20, 1977 (#77001106)	Address restricted	Eugene	
59	Foster–Simmons House	Foster–Simmons House	October 30, 2017 (#100001773)	417 E. 13th Ave. 44°02′45″N 123°05′11″W	Eugene	
60	Gamma Phi Beta Sorority House	Gamma Phi Beta Sorority House	October 24, 1991 (#91001566)	1021 Hilyard St. 44°02′55″N 123°04′50″W	Eugene	
61	Goodpasture Bridge	Goodpasture Bridge	November 29, 1979 (#79002100)	West of Vida; 44°08′54″N 122°35′10″W	Vida	
62	Howard A. Hall House	Howard A. Hall House	July 14, 1988 (#88001036)	1991 Garden Ave. 44°02′47″N 123°03′46″W	Eugene	
63	Elmer Harlow House	Elmer Harlow House	February 12, 1980 (#80003334)	2991 Harlow Rd. 44°04′12″N 123°03′49″W	Eugene	Built in 1922, this bungalow is a representative example of the style promoted by The Craftsman magazine. It is especially notable for fine detailing, including in woodwork and windows. The use of two-tone brickwork emphasizes the refined and careful construction.
64	Hayse Blacksmith Shop	Hayse Blacksmith Shop	November 7, 1980 (#80003335)	357 Van Buren St. 44°03′21″N 123°06′29″W	Eugene	
65	Heceta Head Lighthouse and Keepers Quarters	Heceta Head Lighthouse and Keepers Quarters	November 28, 1978 (#78002296)	North of Florence on U.S. 101; 44°08′15″N 124°07′37″W	Florence	
66	Jessie M. Honeyman Memorial State Park Historic District	Jessie M. Honeyman Memorial State Park Historic District	November 28, 1984 (#84000473)	U.S. 101; 43°55′48″N 124°06′26″W	Dunes City	
67	Johnson Hall	Johnson Hall	June 20, 1985 (#85001351)	E. 13th between University and Kincaid Sts. 44°02′43″N 123°04′29″W	Eugene	
68	William Kyle and Sons Building	William Kyle and Sons Building	December 2, 1981 (#81000499)	1297 Bay St. 43°58′00″N 124°06′19″W	Florence	
69	Lake Creek Bridge	Lake Creek Bridge	November 29, 1979 (#79002091)	West of Greenleaf; 44°06′16″N 123°40′25″W	Greenleaf	
70	Lane County Clerk's Building	Lane County Clerk's Building	November 25, 1983 (#83004174)	740 W. 13th Ave. 44°02′41″N 123°06′09″W	Eugene	
71	Lane County Farmers' Union Cooperative Wholesalers' Association Building	Lane County Farmers' Union Cooperative Wholesalers' Association Building	October 17, 1991 (#91001560)	532 Olive St. 44°03′14″N 123°05′37″W	Eugene	
72	Leaburg Hydroelectric Project Historic District	Leaburg Hydroelectric Project Historic District	June 29, 2015 (#15000375)	14348 McKenzie River Highway; 44°06′05″N 122°41′20″W	Leaburg vicinity	
73	Dr. Norman L. Lee House	Dr. Norman L. Lee House	November 2, 1977 (#77001108)	655 Holly St. 44°13′12″N 123°12′09″W	Junction City	
74	Log Cabin Inn Ensemble	Log Cabin Inn Ensemble	December 4, 2002 (#02001486)	56483 McKenzie Highway; 44°10′27″N 122°09′33″W	McKenzie Bridge	
75	Lowell Bridge	Lowell Bridge	November 29, 1979 (#79002085)	East of Dexter; 43°54′33″N 122°46′42″W	Lowell	
76	Lowell Grange	Lowell Grange	August 10, 2005 (#05000849)	51 E 2nd St. 43°55′17″N 122°46′54″W	Lowell	
77	Marx-Schaefers House^{†}	Marx-Schaefers House	August 2, 2006 (#06000662)	1718 Lincoln St. 44°02′28″N 123°05′45″W	Eugene	
78	Masonic Cemetery and Hope Abbey Mausoleum	Masonic Cemetery and Hope Abbey Mausoleum	September 15, 1980 (#80003336)	25th and University Sts. 44°01′53″N 123°04′24″W	Eugene	
79	Nelson and Margret Mathews House	Nelson and Margret Mathews House	June 14, 1984 (#84003025)	32702 E. Pearl St. 44°08′13″N 123°03′50″W	Coburg	Street was renumbered. Old address: 231 E. Pearl St.
80	McCracken Brothers Motor Freight Building	McCracken Brothers Motor Freight Building	September 21, 2005 (#05001055)	375 W. 4th St. 44°03′21″N 123°05′50″W	Eugene	
81	McDonald Theater Building	McDonald Theater Building	August 26, 1982 (#82003733)	1004–1044 Willamette St. 44°02′55″N 123°05′30″W	Eugene	
82	Old McKenzie Fish Hatchery	Old McKenzie Fish Hatchery	February 23, 1996 (#96000142)	44645 McKenzie Hwy. 44°08′31″N 122°36′31″W	Leaburg	
83	McKenzie Highway Historic District	McKenzie Highway Historic District	February 7, 2011 (#10001215)	OR 242; 44°14′55″N 121°50′18″W	Belknap Springs vicinity	Extends into Linn and Deschutes counties.
84	McMorran and Washburne Department Store Building	McMorran and Washburne Department Store Building	March 2, 1989 (#89000125)	795 Willamette St. 44°03′05″N 123°05′29″W	Eugene	
85	Methodist Episcopal Church of Goshen	Methodist Episcopal Church of Goshen	October 17, 1991 (#91001559)	85896 First St. 43°59′45″N 123°00′37″W	Goshen	
86	Wayne Morse Farm	Wayne Morse Farm	February 12, 1999 (#99000066)	595 Crest Dr. 44°01′23″N 123°05′55″W	Eugene	
87	Mosby Creek Bridge	Mosby Creek Bridge	November 29, 1979 (#79002083)	East of Cottage Grove; 43°46′41″N 123°00′13″W	Cottage Grove	
88	Musick Guard Station	Musick Guard Station	March 6, 1991 (#91000170)	Northeast of Bohemia Mtn., Umpqua NF; 43°34′51″N 122°38′25″W	Cottage Grove	
89	The Neptune Site (35LA3)		September 10, 1997 (#97001017)	Address restricted		
90	Office Bridge	Office Bridge	November 29, 1979 (#79003768)	Crosses N. Fork Middle Fork Willamette River; 43°46′04″N 122°29′40″W	Westfir	
91	Oregon Electric Railway Passenger Station	Oregon Electric Railway Passenger Station	March 13, 1979 (#79002087)	27 E. 5th St. 44°03′17″N 123°05′28″W	Eugene	
92	Oregon Power Company's Springfield Substation	Oregon Power Company's Springfield Substation	February 23, 1996 (#96000170)	590 Main St. 44°02′47″N 123°01′02″W	Springfield	
93	Oregon Railway and Navigation Company Bridge	Oregon Railway and Navigation Company Bridge	March 13, 1980 (#80003332)	Southeast of Coburg; 44°06′45″N 123°02′44″W	Coburg	
94	Our Lady of Perpetual Help Roman Catholic Church	Our Lady of Perpetual Help Roman Catholic Church	February 21, 1997 (#97000127)	147 N. H St. 43°47′57″N 123°03′54″W	Cottage Grove	
95	Pacific Cooperative Poultry Producers Egg-Taking Station	Pacific Cooperative Poultry Producers Egg-Taking Station	September 8, 1988 (#88001523)	506 Olive St. 44°03′12″N 123°05′37″W	Eugene	
96	Palace Hotel	Palace Hotel	December 23, 1977 (#77001105)	488 Willamette St. 44°03′16″N 123°05′35″W	Eugene	
97	Parvin Bridge	Parvin Bridge	November 29, 1979 (#79003767)	South of Dexter off Lost Creek Rd. 43°53′59″N 122°49′17″W	Dexter	
98	Patterson-Stratton House	Patterson-Stratton House	September 29, 1992 (#92001262)	1605 Pearl St. 44°02′32″N 123°05′18″W	Eugene	
99	Pengra Bridge	Pengra Bridge	November 29, 1979 (#79002092)	Spanning Fall Creek on Place Road; 43°57′58″N 122°50′43″W	Jasper vicinity	
100	A. V. Peters House	A. V. Peters House	October 25, 1990 (#90001597)	1611 Lincoln St. 44°02′32″N 123°05′44″W	Eugene	
101	Petersen Apartments^{†}	Petersen Apartments	December 16, 2005 (#05001420)	1263 Oak St. 44°02′46″N 123°05′23″W	Eugene	
102	Wallace and Glenn Potter House	Wallace and Glenn Potter House	April 24, 2007 (#07000360)	120 Fir Ln. 44°03′56″N 123°06′54″W	Eugene	
103	Psi Alpha Chapter, Chi Omega House	Psi Alpha Chapter, Chi Omega House	December 28, 2001 (#01001402)	1461 Alder St. 44°02′37″N 123°04′50″W	Eugene	
104	Quackenbush Hardware Store	Quackenbush Hardware Store	September 23, 1982 (#82003734)	160 E. Broadway; 44°02′56″N 123°05′20″W	Eugene	
105	Rice Apartments^{†}	Rice Apartments	November 15, 2006 (#06001031)	360 W. 13th Ave. 44°02′43″N 123°05′52″W	Eugene	
106	Schaefers Building	Schaefers Building	October 30, 1979 (#79003735)	1001 Willamette St. 44°02′55″N 123°05′28″W	Eugene	
107	Shelton-McMurphey House and Grounds	Shelton-McMurphey House and Grounds	June 14, 1984 (#84003028)	303 Willamette St. 44°03′28″N 123°05′25″W	Eugene	
108	Horace J. and Ann S. Shinn Cottage	Horace J. and Ann S. Shinn Cottage	March 5, 1998 (#98000206)	1308 Ash Ave. 43°47′56″N 123°04′10″W	Cottage Grove	
109	Siuslaw River Bridge No. 01821	Siuslaw River Bridge No. 01821	August 5, 2005 (#05000816)	OR Coast 9, US101, MP109.98; 43°57′52″N 124°06′27″W	Florence	
110	Smeede Hotel	Smeede Hotel	January 17, 1974 (#74001691)	767 Willamette St. 44°03′06″N 123°05′28″W	Eugene	
111	Southern Pacific Passenger Depot	Southern Pacific Passenger Depot	August 16, 2007 (#07000823)	433 Willamette St. 44°03′18″N 123°05′29″W	Eugene	
112	Southern Pacific Railroad Passenger Station and Freight House	Southern Pacific Railroad Passenger Station and Freight House	February 24, 1993 (#82005088)	101 S. A St. 44°02′41″N 123°00′56″W	Springfield	
113	Springfield General Hospital	Springfield General Hospital	September 1, 1983 (#83002159)	846 F St. 44°03′06″N 123°00′52″W	Springfield	
114	Springfield High School		October 23, 2023 (#100009475)	525 Mill Street; 44°03′01″N 123°01′32″W	Springfield	
115	Springfield Motors Buick Dealership	Springfield Motors Buick Dealership	June 1, 2011 (#11000328)	702 North A St. 44°02′50″N 123°01′00″W	Springfield	
116	Stewart Bridge	Stewart Bridge	November 29, 1979 (#79002102)	Southeast of Walden; 43°45′59″N 122°59′35″W	Walden	
117	LaSells D. Stewart House	LaSells D. Stewart House	January 28, 1994 (#93001569)	1807 E. Main St. 43°47′50″N 123°02′50″W	Cottage Grove	
118	Strawberry Hill Site (35LA8)		September 10, 1997 (#97001022)	Address restricted		
119	John Sutherland House	John Sutherland House	February 2, 1995 (#94001631)	83246 Lorane Highway; 43°55′06″N 123°14′23″W	Eugene	
120	Ten Mile Creek Bridge No. 01181	Ten Mile Creek Bridge No. 01181	August 5, 2005 (#05000818)	OR Coast 9, US101, MP171.44; 44°13′27″N 124°06′35″W	Yachats vicinity	
121	Thompson-Roach Building	Thompson-Roach Building	November 15, 2006 (#06001032)	544–550 E. 13th Ave. 44°02′43″N 123°04′59″W	Eugene	Included in Eugene West University Neighborhood MPS
122	Triangle Lake Round Barn	Triangle Lake Round Barn	July 3, 2017 (#100001274)	19941 Highway 36; 44°11′20″N 123°33′47″W	Blachly vicinity	
123	Unity Bridge	Unity Bridge	November 29, 1979 (#79002093)	North of Lowell; 43°56′43″N 122°46′26″W	Lowell	
124	University of Oregon Library and Memorial Quadrangle	University of Oregon Library and Memorial Quadrangle	March 9, 1990 (#90000370)	Kincaid St. at E. Fifteenth Ave. 44°02′38″N 123°04′39″W	Eugene	Includes the Knight Library
125	University of Oregon Museum of Art	University of Oregon Museum of Art	June 5, 1986 (#86001224)	1430 Johnson Lane; 44°02′39″N 123°04′37″W	Eugene	Also known as the "Jordan Schnitzer Museum of Art"
126	U.S. Post Office	U.S. Post Office	August 14, 1985 (#85001805)	520 Willamette St. 44°03′14″N 123°05′35″W	Eugene	
127	Villard Hall	Villard Hall	April 11, 1972 (#72001083)	University of Oregon; 44°02′50″N 123°04′35″W	Eugene	
128	Washburne Historic District	Washburne Historic District	February 10, 1987 (#87000042)	Roughly bounded by G, N. Tenth, A, and N. Second Sts. 44°03′01″N 123°01′00″W	Springfield	
129	Wendling Bridge	Wendling Bridge	November 29, 1979 (#79002095)	Northeast of Marcola; 44°11′29″N 122°47′56″W	Wendling	
130	Wildcat Creek Bridge	Wildcat Creek Bridge	November 29, 1979 (#79002089)	West of Eugene; 44°00′13″N 123°39′09″W	Walton	
131	Wilder Apartments^{†}	Wilder Apartments	August 23, 2006 (#06000727)	259 E. 13th Ave. 44°02′45″N 123°05′15″W	Eugene	
132	Willakenzie Grange Hall	Willakenzie Grange Hall	January 22, 2009 (#08001368)	3055 Willakenzie Rd. 44°04′55″N 123°03′47″W	Eugene	
133	C. S. Williams House	C. S. Williams House	July 14, 1988 (#88001037)	1973 Garden Ave. 44°02′48″N 123°03′42″W	Eugene	
134	Lew Williams Chevrolet Dealership	Lew Williams Chevrolet Dealership	June 1, 2011 (#11000329)	2020 Franklin Blvd. 44°02′39″N 123°03′44″W	Eugene	
135	Woodrow Wilson Junior High School	Woodrow Wilson Junior High School	October 25, 1990 (#90001602)	650 W. Twelfth Ave. 44°02′47″N 123°06′04″W	Eugene	
136	Women's Memorial Quadrangle Ensemble	Women's Memorial Quadrangle Ensemble	October 2, 1992 (#92001320)	Bounded by University St., Johnson Ln. and Pioneer Cemetery on the University of Oregon campus 44°02′38″N 123°04′28″W	Eugene	
137	Woodmen of the World Hall	Woodmen of the World Hall	June 3, 1996 (#96000618)	291 W. 8th Ave. 44°03′04″N 123°05′50″W	Eugene	
138	James W. Working Flats	James W. Working Flats	August 26, 1994 (#94001024)	614 Lawrence St. 44°03′12″N 123°05′52″W	Eugene	

== Former listings ==
	Name on the Register	Image	Date listed	Date removed	Location	City or town	Description
1	Amazon Family Housing Complex		March 1, 1996 (#95000090)	October 22, 1996	24th Ave and Patterson St.	Eugene	
2	Brattain–Hadley House	Brattain–Hadley House	September 14, 1995 (#95001099)	May 8, 2012	1260 Main St. 44°02′47″N 123°00′22″W	Springfield	Severely damaged by fire in 1997. Was demolished in 2012.
3	Brumbaugh Bridge		November 29, 1979 (#79002101)	November 25, 1986	SE of Walden	Walden vicinity	Demolished in 1979.
4	Eugene Civic Stadium	Eugene Civic Stadium	October 6, 2008 (#08000183)	March 8, 2016	2077 Willamette St. 44°02′13″N 123°05′29″W	Eugene	Destroyed by fire June 29, 2015
5	Horse Creek Bridge	Horse Creek Bridge	November 29, 1979 (#79002096)	July 27, 1988	S of McKenzie Bridge	McKenzie Bridge	Dismantled in 1987. Parts were used to build other bridges in Myrtle Creek and Cottage Grove
6	Jacob C. Spores House		November 2, 1977 (#77001107)	August 1, 2001	N of Eugene at 90311 Coburg Rd.	Eugene vicinity	Destroyed by fire in 1996.
7	Charles S. Williams House		October 31, 1985 (#85003479)	June 16, 1987	228 E. Twelfth	Eugene vicinity	

== Key ==
^{†}	part of Residential Architecture of Eugene, Oregon MPS
	Building, site, object, or structure
^{∞}	Historic district

== See also ==
- National Register of Historic Places listings in Oregon
- Listings in neighboring counties: Benton, Deschutes, Douglas, Klamath, Lincoln, Linn
- List of National Historic Landmarks in Oregon
- Historic preservation
- History of Oregon
- Lists of Oregon-related topics
