= McCracken Brothers Motor Freight Building =

- U.S. National Register of Historic Places
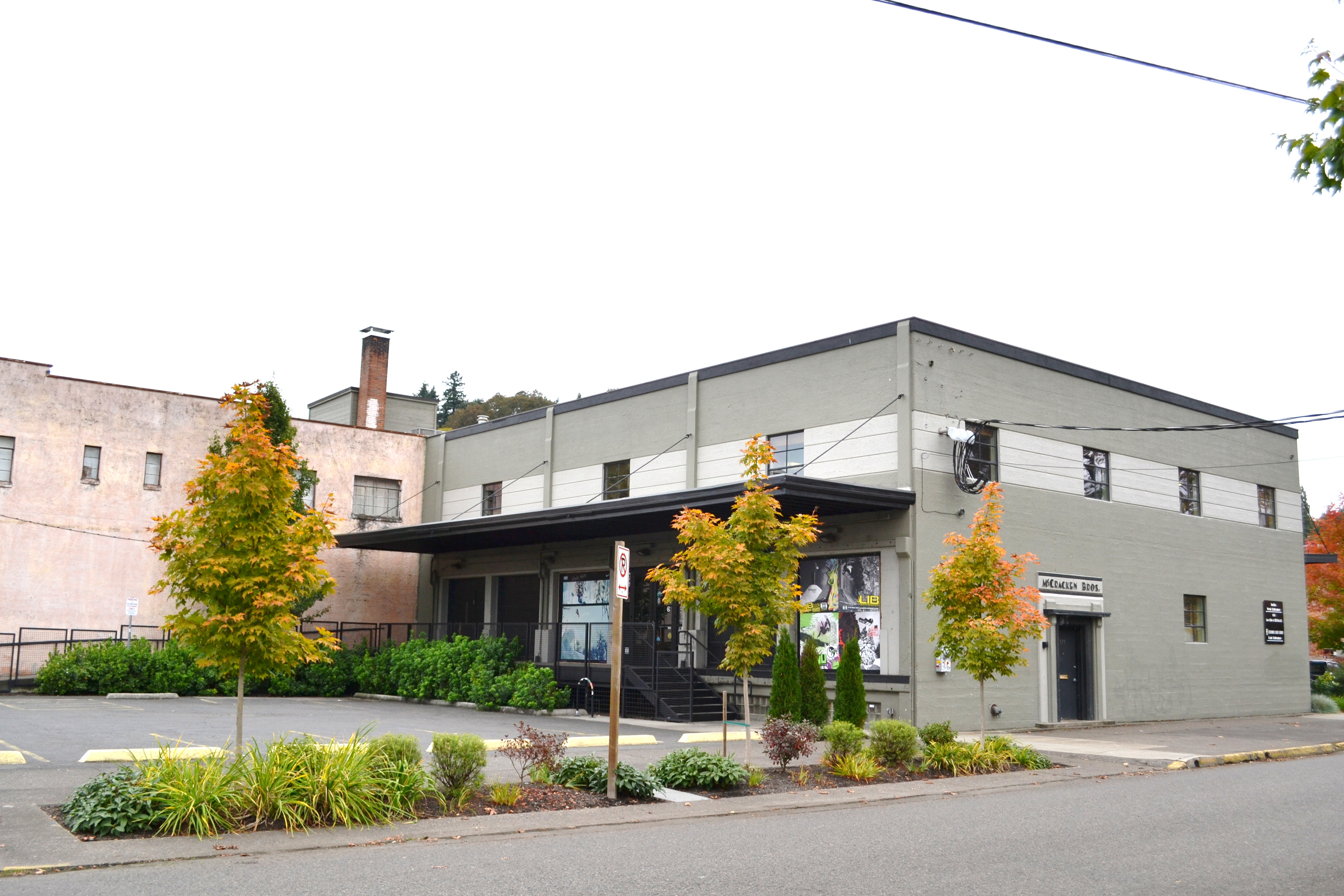
- The building in 2011

- Location within Oregon Location within the United States
- Location: 375 W. 4th St., Eugene, Oregon
- Coordinates: 44°03′21″N 123°05′50″W
- Area: 0.7 acres (0.28 ha)
- Built: 1946
- Built by: Wayne Shields
- Architectural style: Art Deco, Industrial
- NRHP reference No.: 05001055
- Added to NRHP: September 21, 2005

The McCracken Brothers Motor Freight Building, located in Eugene, Oregon, is listed on the National Register of Historic Places.

== See also ==
- National Register of Historic Places listings in Lane County, Oregon
