= Windsor W. Calkins House =

Historic house in Eugene, Oregon, U.S.

- U.S. National Register of Historic Places
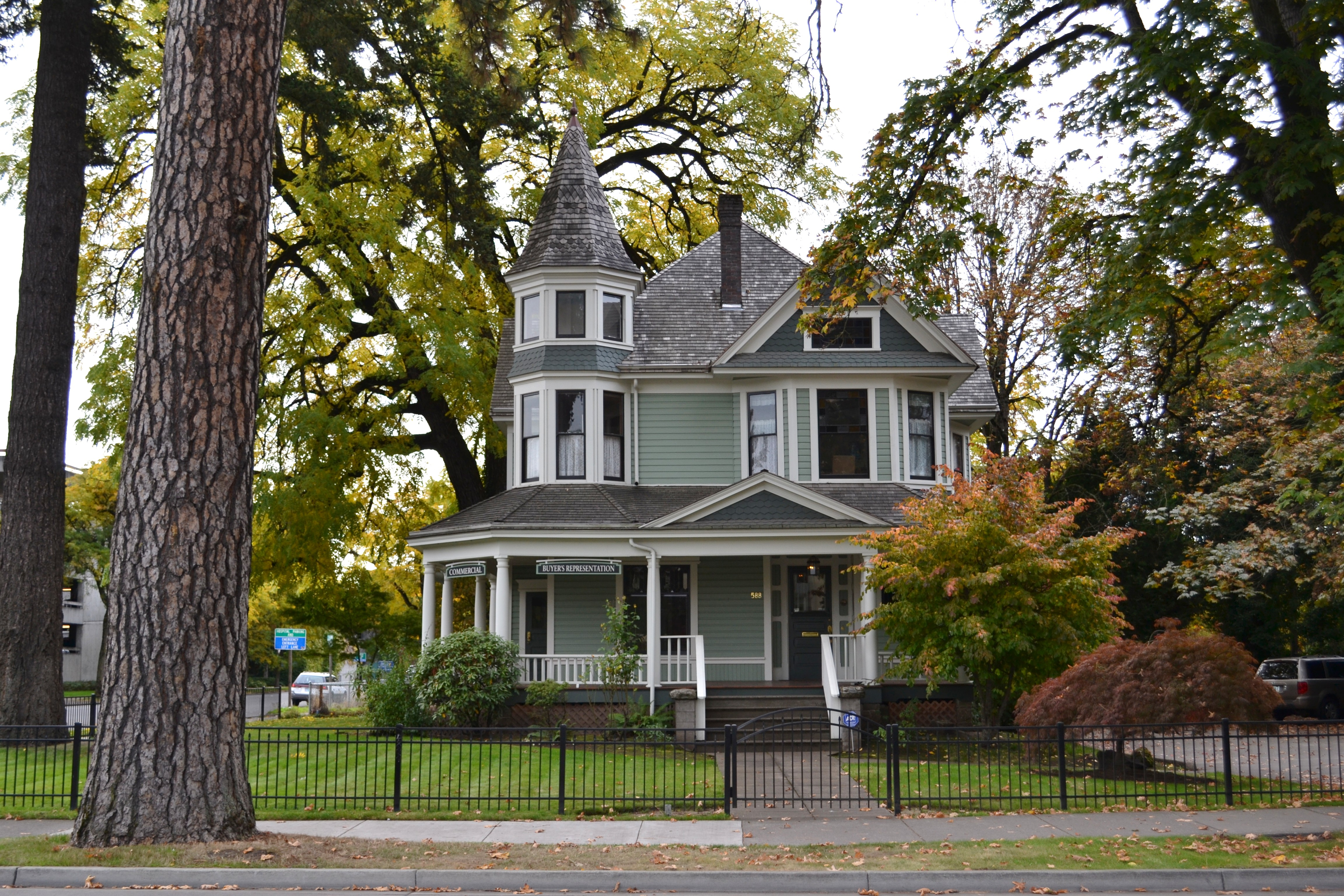

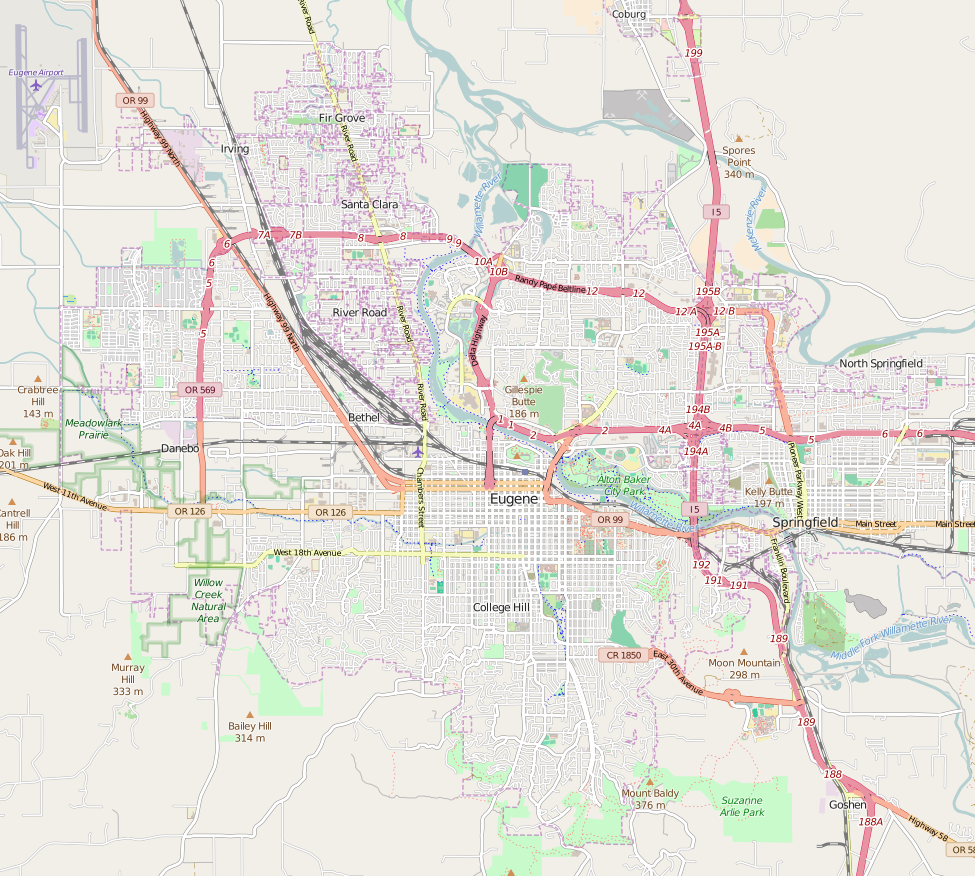
- Location within Eugene OR Location within Oregon
- Location: 588 E. 11th Avenue, Eugene, Oregon
- Coordinates: 44°2′51″N 123°4′58″W
- Area: less than one acre
- Built: 1902
- Architectural style: Queen Anne
- NRHP reference No.: 81000498
- Added to NRHP: December 9, 1981

The Windsor W. Calkins House is a historic house located in Eugene, Oregon. It was listed on the National Register of Historic Places on December 9, 1981.

== Description and history ==
The Queen Anne style house was built in 1902 for Windsor W. Calkins, a prominent Eugene attorney and banker, and embodies the distinctive characteristics of its style, including a multitude of gables, bays, a corner tower, flare top chimneys, and variegated wood siding. It is a 2 1/2-story structure, rectangular in plan with four two-story projecting bays. The house is in good condition and remains virtually unaltered.

== See also ==
- National Register of Historic Places listings in Lane County, Oregon
