= John Sutherland House =

Historic house in Oregon, United States

- U.S. National Register of Historic Places
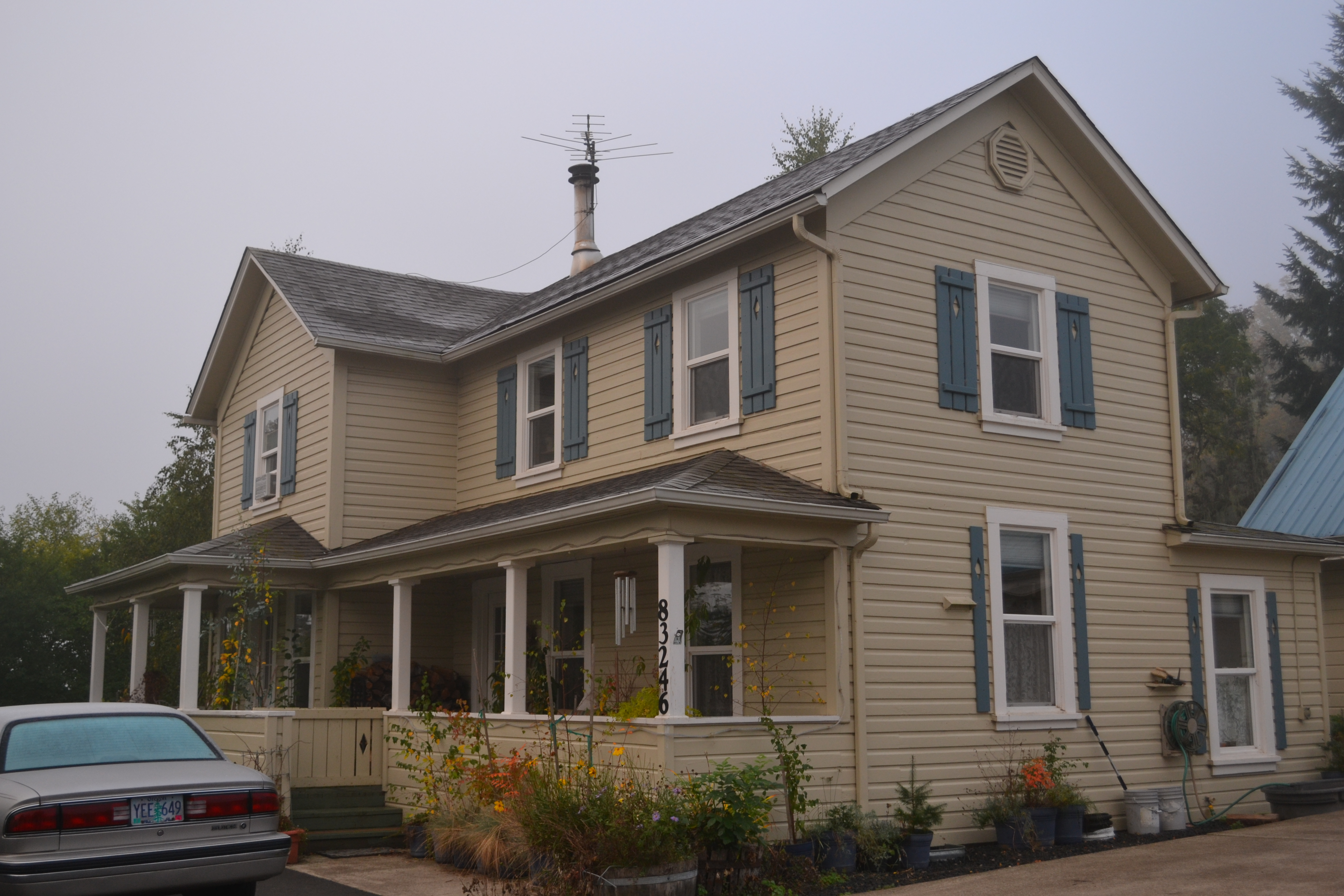
- The house in 2011

- Location within Oregon
- Location: 83246 Lorane Highway, Eugene, Oregon
- Coordinates: 43°55′06″N 123°14′23″W
- Architectural style: Rural Gothic
- NRHP reference No.: 94001631
- Added to NRHP: February 2, 1995

The John Sutherland House, located in Eugene, Oregon, is a house listed on the National Register of Historic Places.

== See also ==
- National Register of Historic Places listings in Lane County, Oregon
