= Amazon Family Housing Complex =

Former residential complex located in Eugene, Oregon, U.S.

Coordinates: 44.03465°N 123.08472°W

- Formerly listed on the U.S. National Register of Historic Places
- U.S. Historic district
- The Amazon Family Housing Complex during its demolition in 1995

- Location within Oregon Location within the United States
- Location: Jct. of 24th Ave. and Patterson St., Eugene, Oregon
- Area: 14 acres (5.7 ha)
- Built: 1947
- Architect: Belluschi, Pietro; U. of Oregon Dept. of Physical Plant
- Architectural style: Modern Movement, Prefab WWII worker housing
- NRHP reference No.: 95000090

Significant dates
- Added to NRHP: 1995
- Removed from NRHP: October 22, 1996

The Amazon Family Housing Complex was a residential complex located in Eugene, Oregon, formerly listed on the National Register of Historic Places. They were demolished in 1995, and removed from the Register in October 1996.

== See also ==
- National Register of Historic Places listings in Lane County, Oregon
