= Benjamin Franklin Dorris House =

Historic house in Oregon, United States

- U.S. National Register of Historic Places
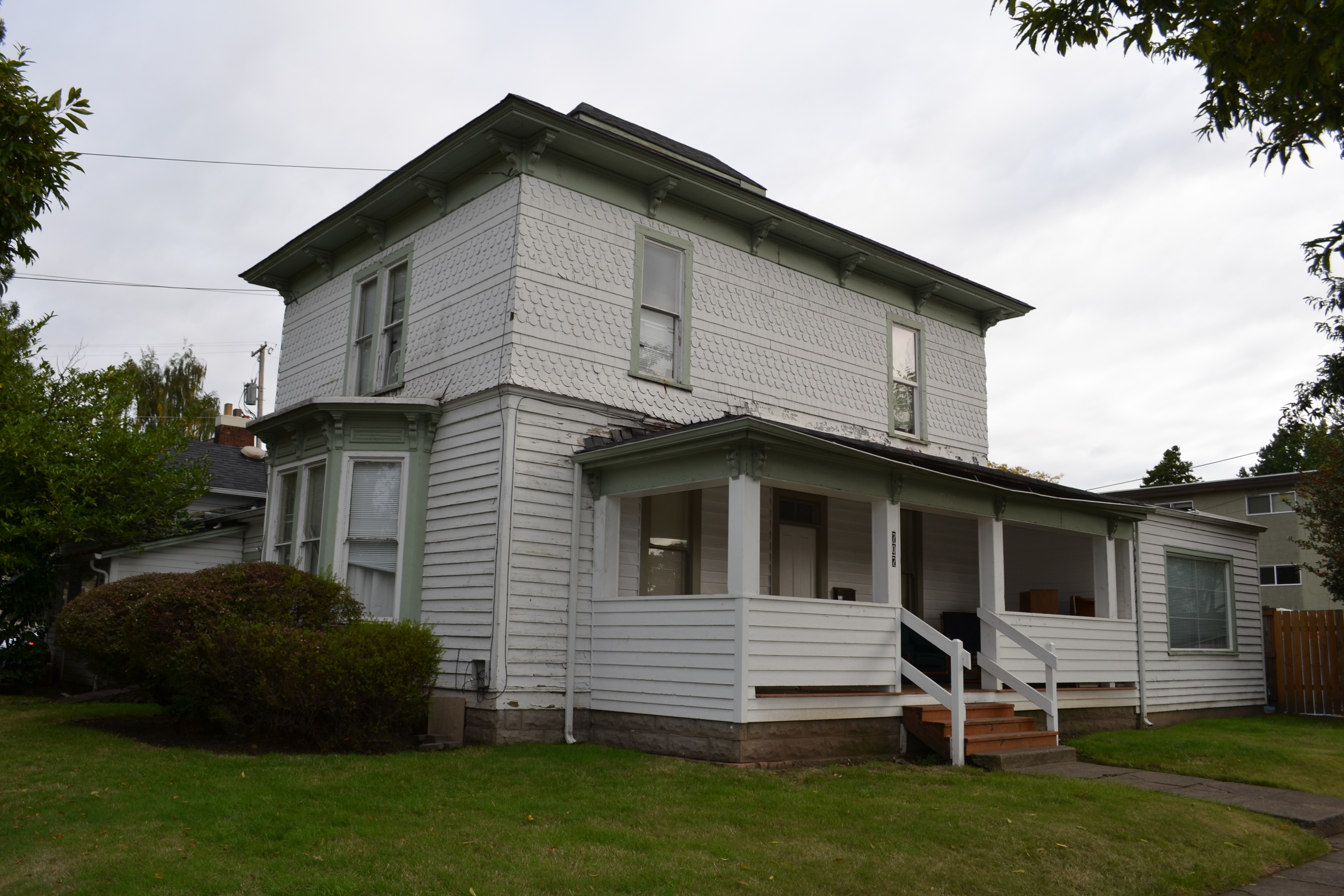
- The house's exterior in 2011

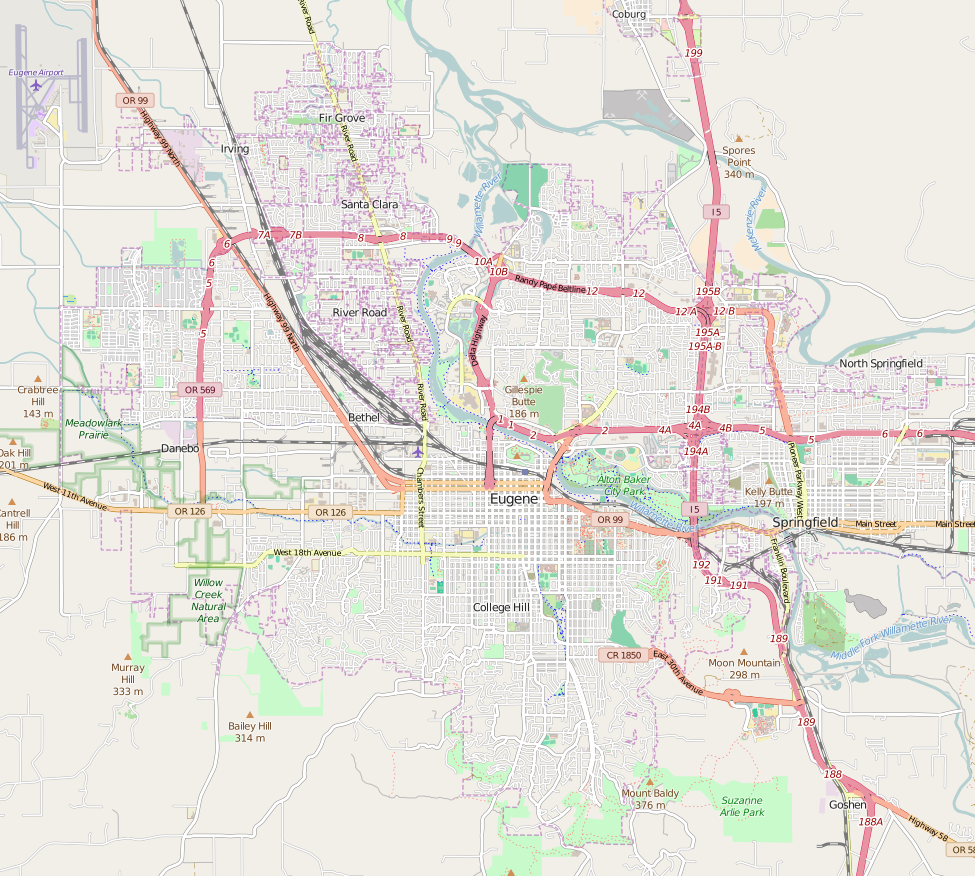
- Location within Eugene OR Location within Oregon
- Location: 707 E. 17th Ave., Eugene, Oregon
- Coordinates: 44°2′29″N 123°4′51″W
- Area: 0.2 acres (0.081 ha)
- Architectural style: Italianate
- NRHP reference No.: 96000171
- Added to NRHP: February 23, 1996

The Benjamin Franklin Dorris House is a house located in Eugene, Oregon, listed in the National Register of Historic Places.

== See also ==
- National Register of Historic Places listings in Lane County, Oregon
