= Pacific Cooperative Poultry Producers Egg-Taking Station =

- U.S. National Register of Historic Places
- Location within Oregon Location within the United States
- Location: 506 Olive Street; Eugene, Oregon
- Coordinates: 44°3′12″N 123°5′37″W
- Area: 0.6 acres (0.24 ha)
- Built: 1928
- Architectural style: Industrial
- NRHP reference No.: 88001523
- Added to NRHP: September 8, 1988

The Pacific Cooperative Poultry Producers Egg-Taking Station, located in Eugene, Oregon, is listed on the National Register of Historic Places.

== See also ==
- National Register of Historic Places listings in Lane County, Oregon
