= Frank L. and Ida H. Chambers House =

Historic house in Oregon, United States

- U.S. National Register of Historic Places
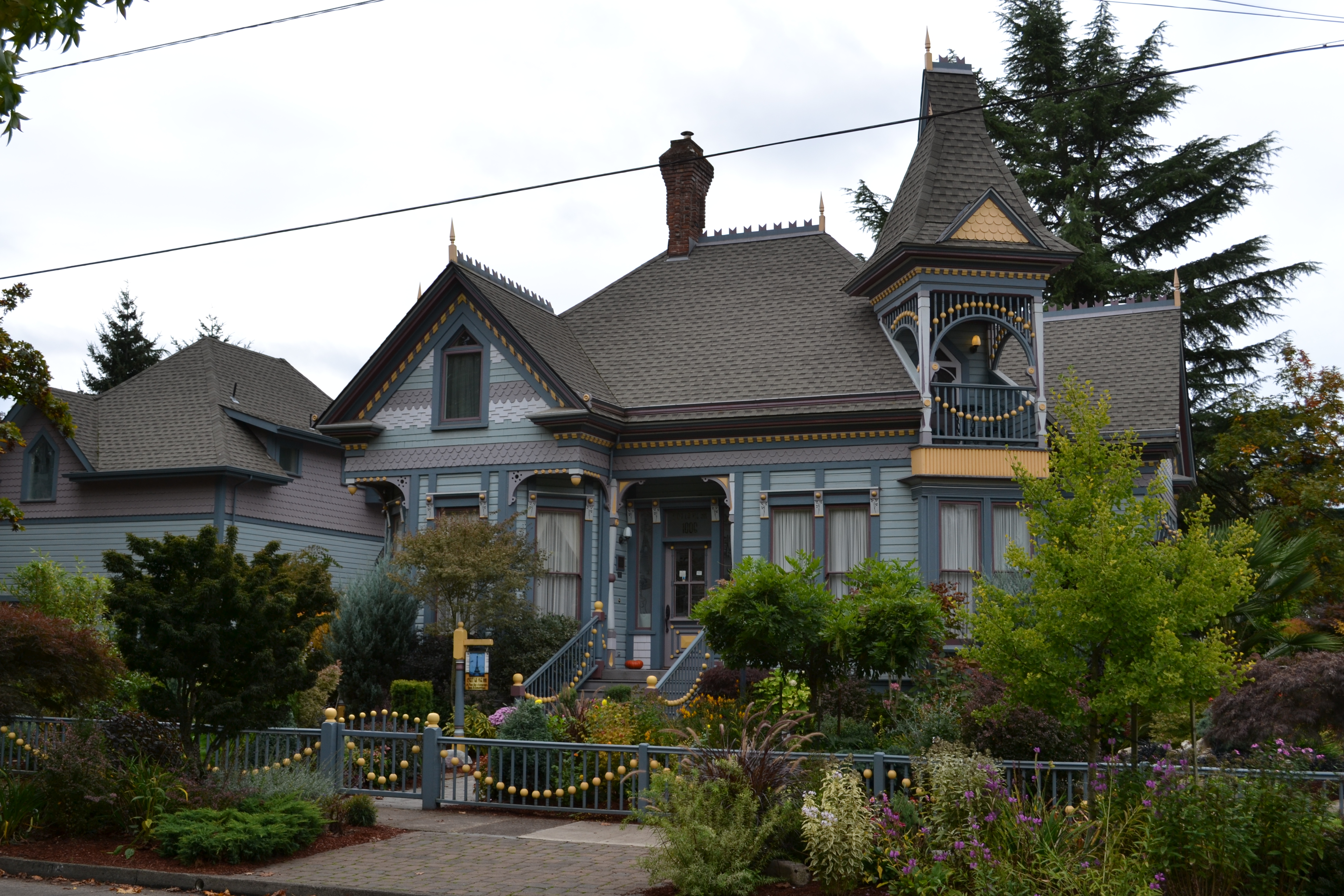

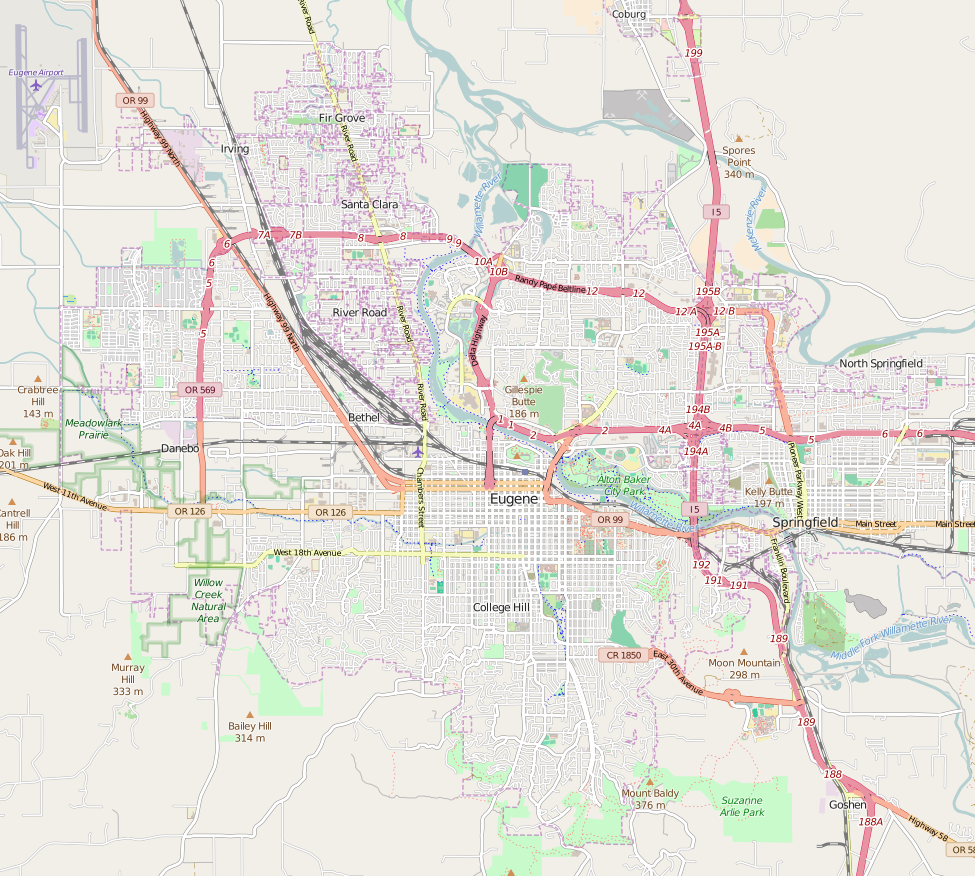
- Location within Eugene OR Location within Oregon Location within the United States
- Location: 1006 Taylor St., Eugene, Oregon
- Coordinates: 44°2′55″N 123°6′51″W
- Area: less than one acre
- Built: 1891
- Architect: William Alexander
- Architectural style: Queen Anne, Eastlake
- NRHP reference No.: 87001537
- Added to NRHP: September 14, 1987

The Frank L. and Ida H. Chambers House, located in Eugene, Oregon, is listed on the National Register of Historic Places.

== See also ==
- National Register of Historic Places listings in Lane County, Oregon
