= Triangle Lake Round Barn =

Round barn in Lane County, Oregon, U.S.

Coordinates: 44.18887°N 123.56313°W

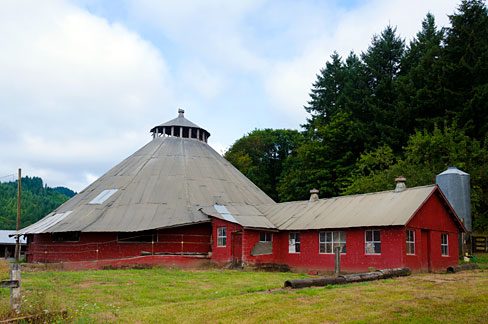

- Location within Oregon Location within the United States
- Location: Eugene, Oregon
- Added to NRHP: July 3 2017

The Triangle Lake Round Barn, located west of Eugene, Oregon, was built between 1946 and 1949, and added to the National Register of Historic Places on July 3 2017.

The barn was built by John P. Sumich (1925–2020), a dairy farmer. It holds the distinction of being the first round barn built in Oregon, and the only one used for dairy farming. The barn is created with locally sourced materials and uses concrete blocks for walls, Douglas fir beams for support poles, and aluminum sheet roofing.

While the condition of the barn has deteriorated after serving as a pheasant farm, a movement to restore the barn into a community center has gained some support since 2016. Beginning in 2016, the current owners began to raise funds, estimated to be about $53,000, for the restoration of the barn due to damage caused by several winter storms as well as a lack of maintenance while serving as a pheasant farm from 1996 on for several years. If restored, it is slated to be used as a community center and location for agriculture education for the local Triangle Lake School.

== See also ==
- National Register of Historic Places listings in Lane County, Oregon
