= Rice Apartments =

- U.S. National Register of Historic Places
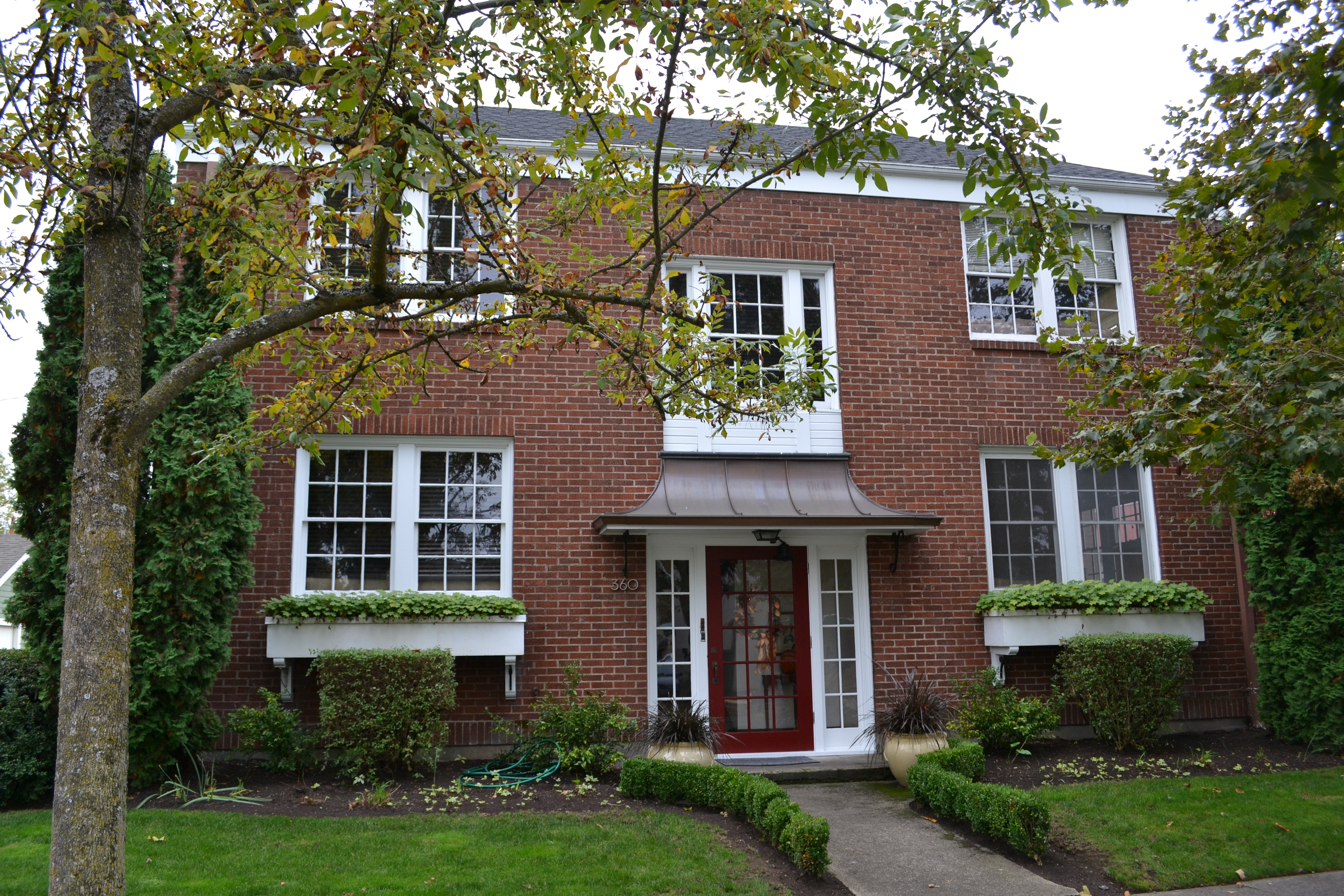
- The building's front exterior, 2011

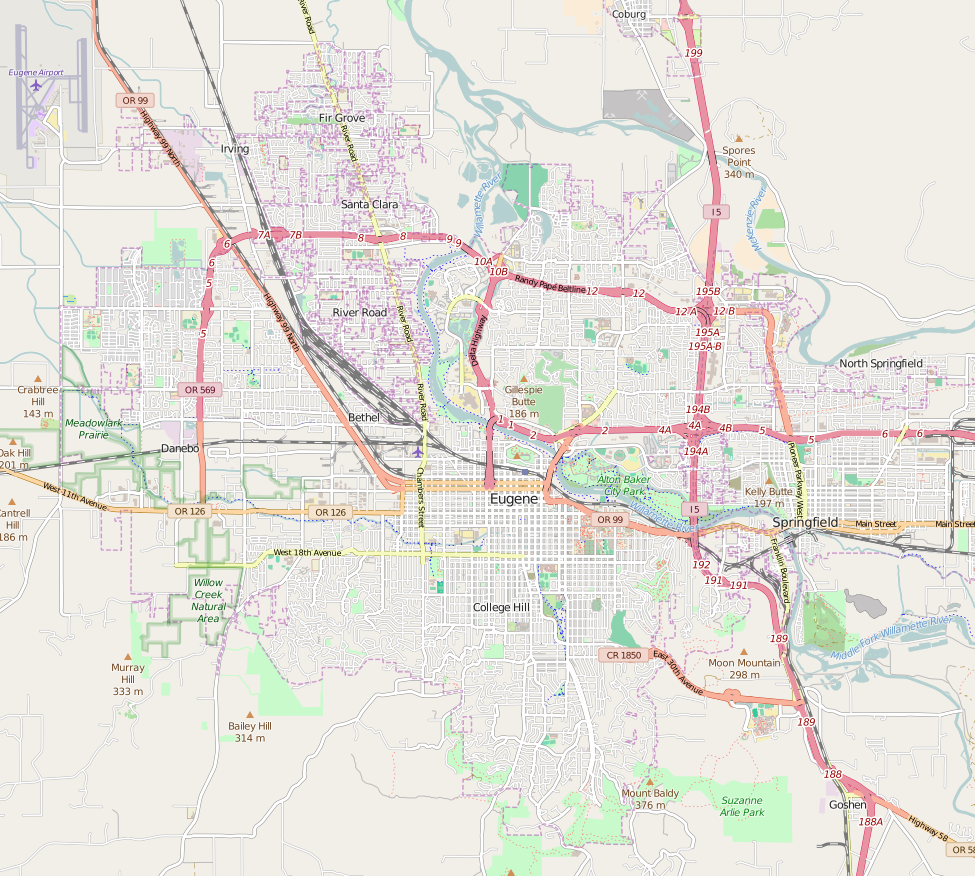
- Location within Eugene OR Location within Oregon
- Location: 360 W. 13th Avenue; Eugene, Oregon
- Coordinates: 44°02′43″N 123°05′52″W
- Area: Less than 1 acre (0.40 ha)
- Built: 1936
- Built by: Snook Brothers
- Architect: Graham Braden Smith
- Architectural style: Colonial Revival, Regency variation
- NRHP reference No.: 06001031
- Added to NRHP: November 15, 2006

The Rice Apartments are a historic apartment building in Eugene, Oregon, United States.

The building was added to the National Register of Historic Places in 2006.

== See also ==
- National Register of Historic Places listings in Lane County, Oregon
