= Willakenzie Grange Hall =

- U.S. National Register of Historic Places
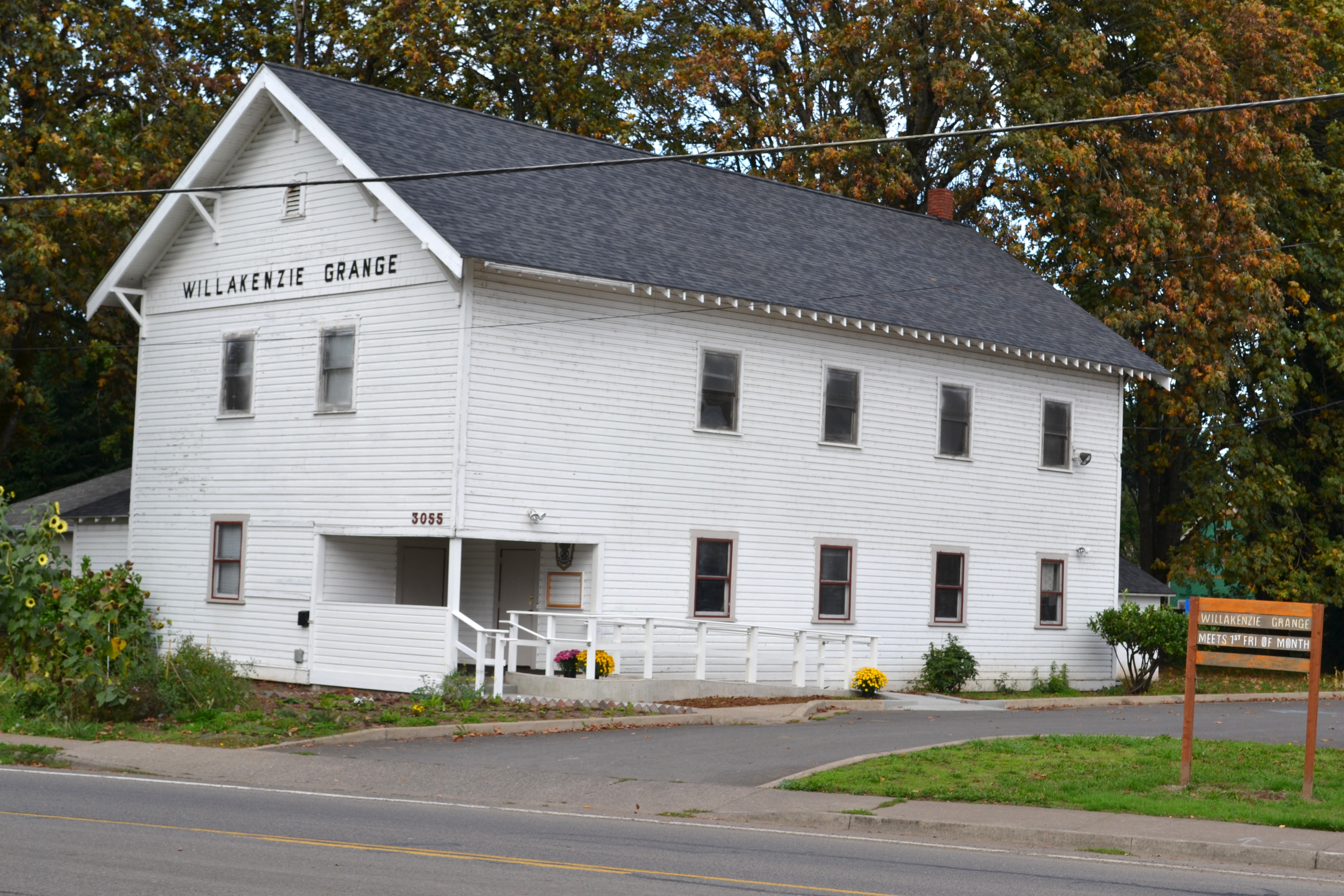
- The Willakenzie Grange Hall in 2011

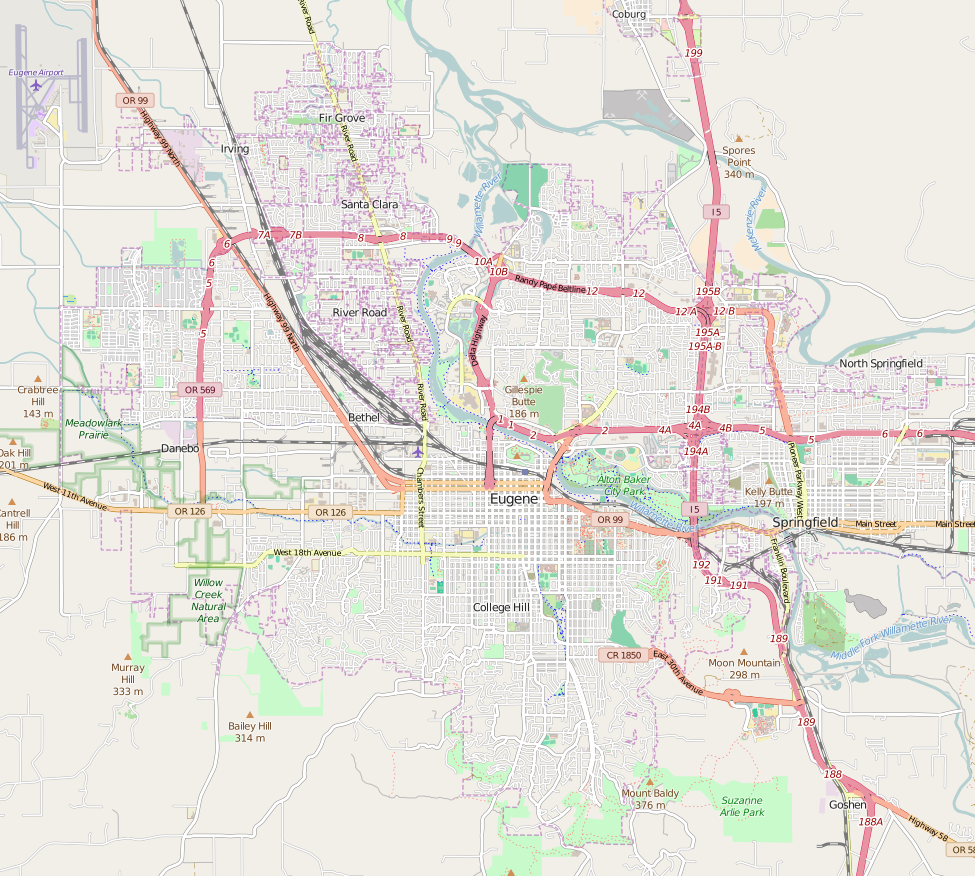
- Location within Eugene OR Location within Oregon
- Location: 3055 Willakenzie Road; Eugene, Oregon
- Coordinates: 44°04′55″N 123°03′47″W
- Area: 0.8 acres (0.32 ha)
- Built: 1913
- Architect: George Smith, Ira Calef, C. A. Rice
- Architectural style: Vernacular Craftsman
- NRHP reference No.: 08001368
- Added to NRHP: January 22, 2009

The Willakenzie Grange Hall is a historic community meeting hall in Eugene, Oregon, United States.

The grange hall was listed on the National Register of Historic Places in 2009.

== See also ==
- National Register of Historic Places listings in Lane County, Oregon
