= Ax Billy Department Store =

- U.S. National Register of Historic Places
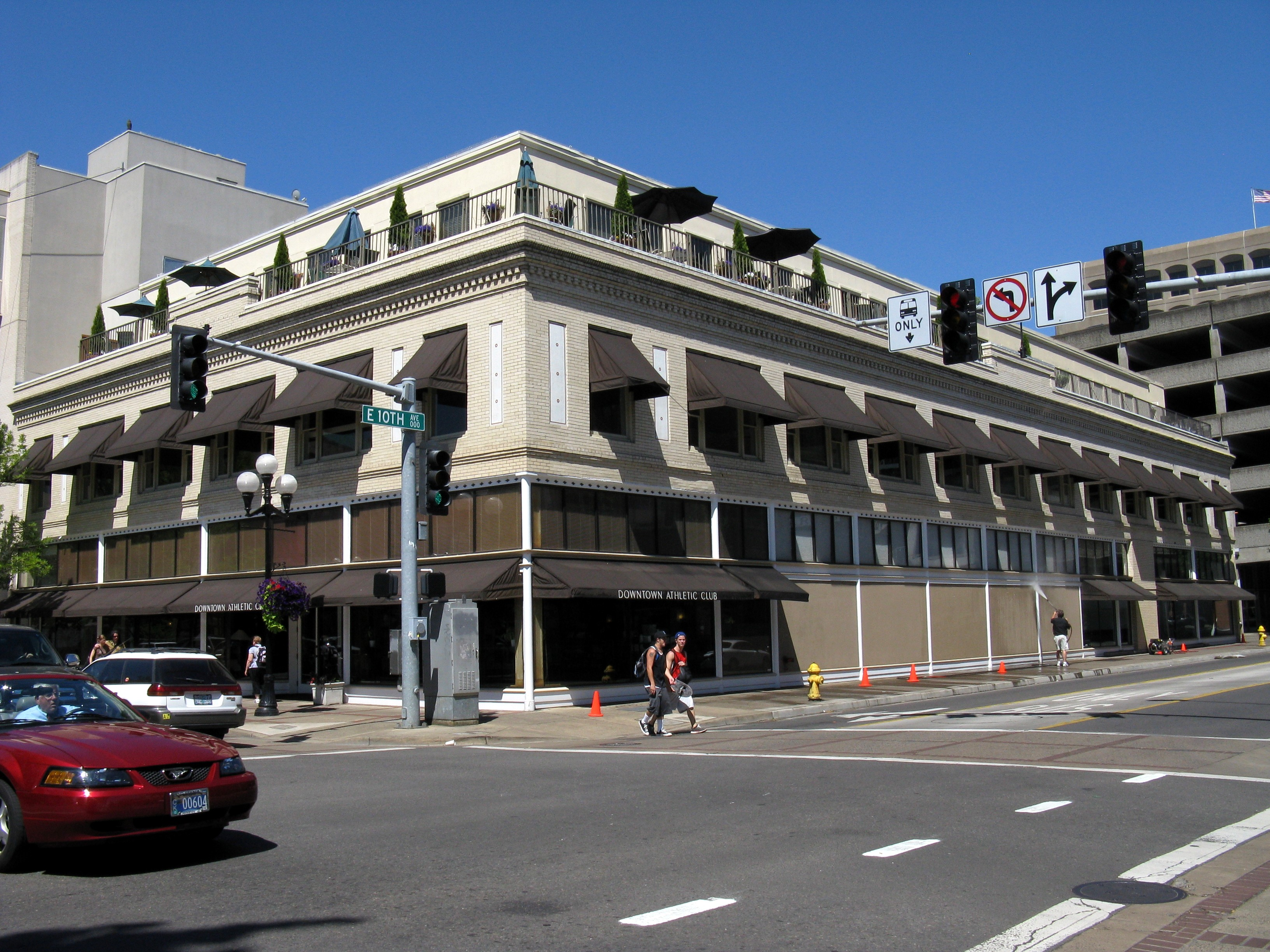
- The building in 2009

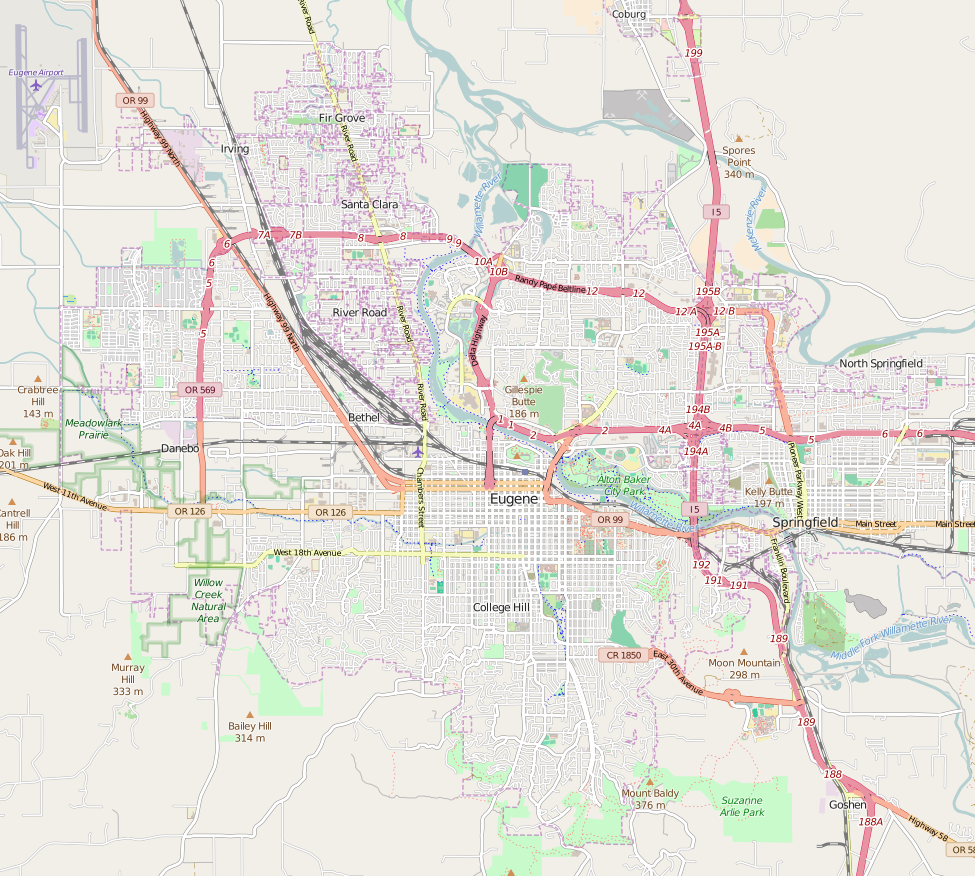
- Location within Eugene OR Location within Oregon
- Location: E. 10th & Willamette St., Eugene, Oregon
- Coordinates: 44°02′56″N 123°05′28″W
- Built: 1910
- NRHP reference No.: 82003731
- Added to NRHP: August 26, 1982

The Ax Billy Department Store, located in Eugene, Oregon, is listed on the National Register of Historic Places. It is currently occupied by the Downtown Athletic Club.

== See also ==
- National Register of Historic Places listings in Lane County, Oregon
