= Chase Gardens Residential Grouping =

Historic houses in Oregon, United States

Coordinates: 44.05892°N 123.05198°W

- U.S. National Register of Historic Places
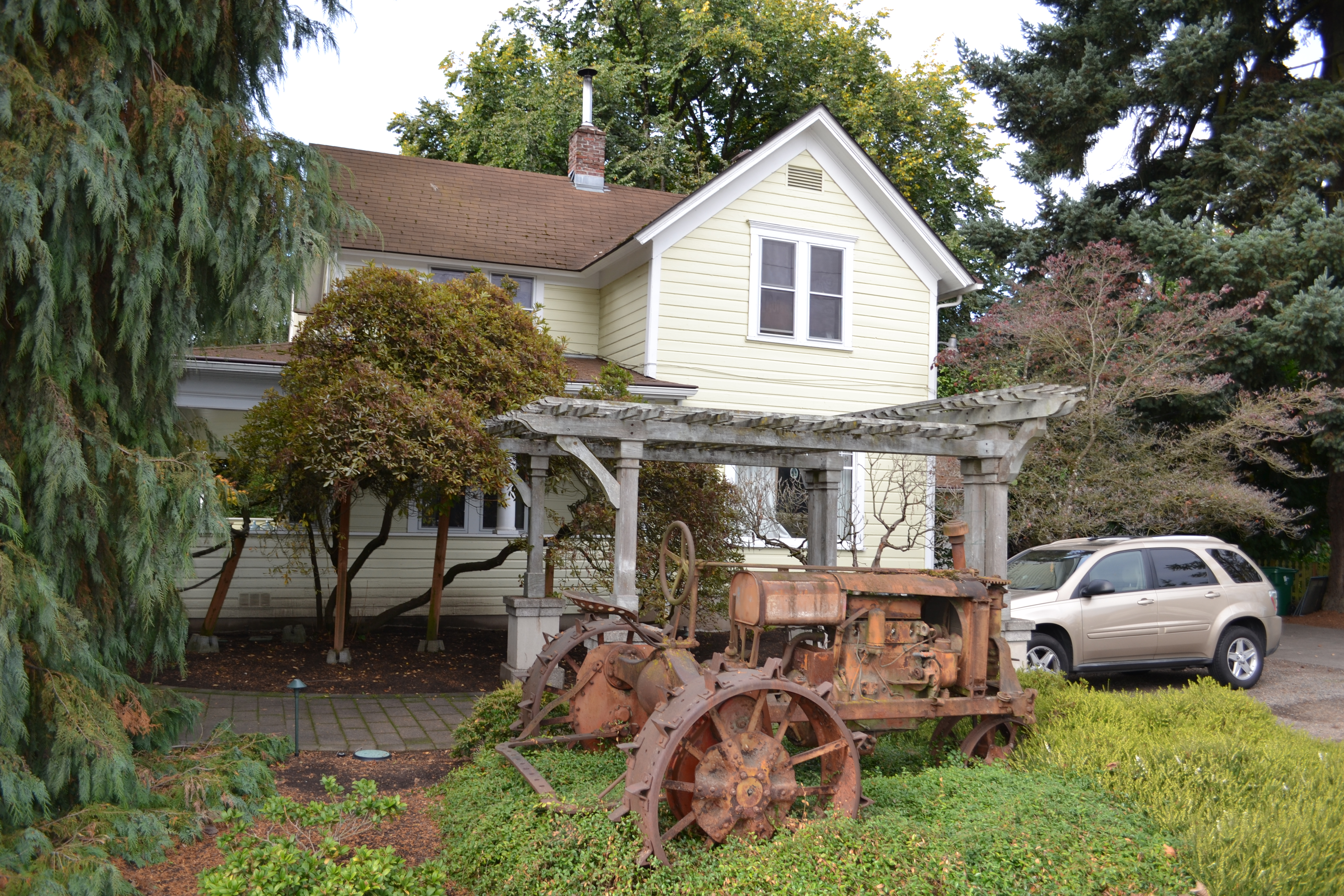

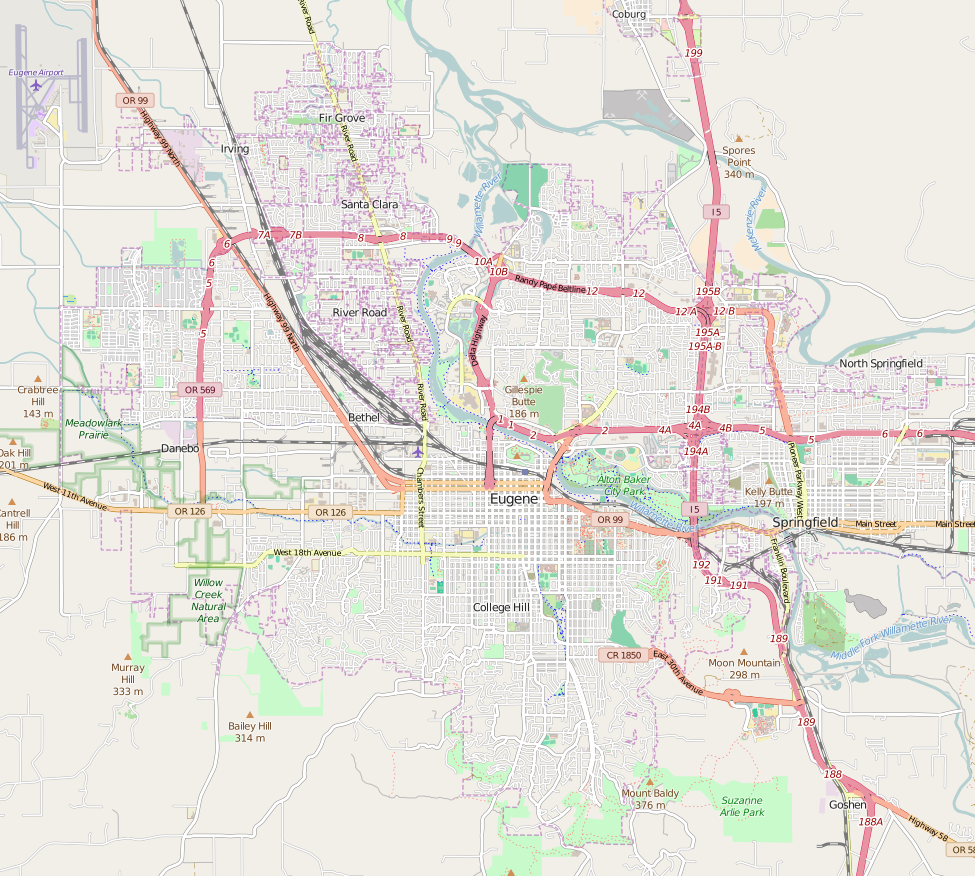
- Location within Eugene OR Location within Oregon
- Nearest city: Eugene, Oregon
- Area: 6 acres (2.4 ha)
- Built: 1889
- Architect: Wallace Hayden
- Architectural style: Gothic Revival, Queen Anne
- NRHP reference No.: 99000943
- Added to NRHP: August 5, 1999

The Chase Gardens Residential Grouping is a collection of five houses built during 1889-1945 located in Eugene, Oregon that are listed on the National Register of Historic Places.

== See also ==
- National Register of Historic Places listings in Lane County, Oregon
