= Abraham and Phoebe Ball House =

Historic house in Oregon, United States

- U.S. National Register of Historic Places
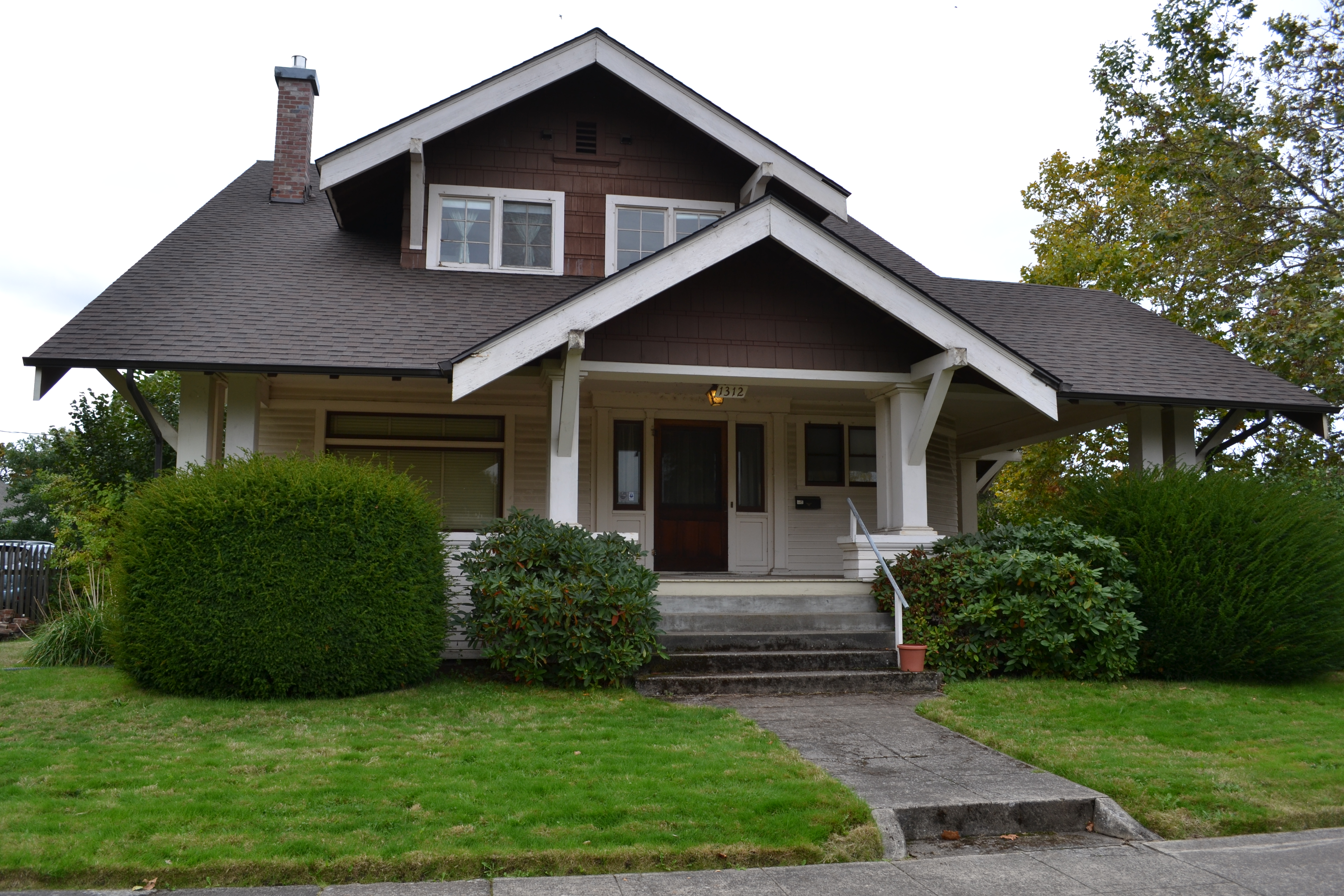

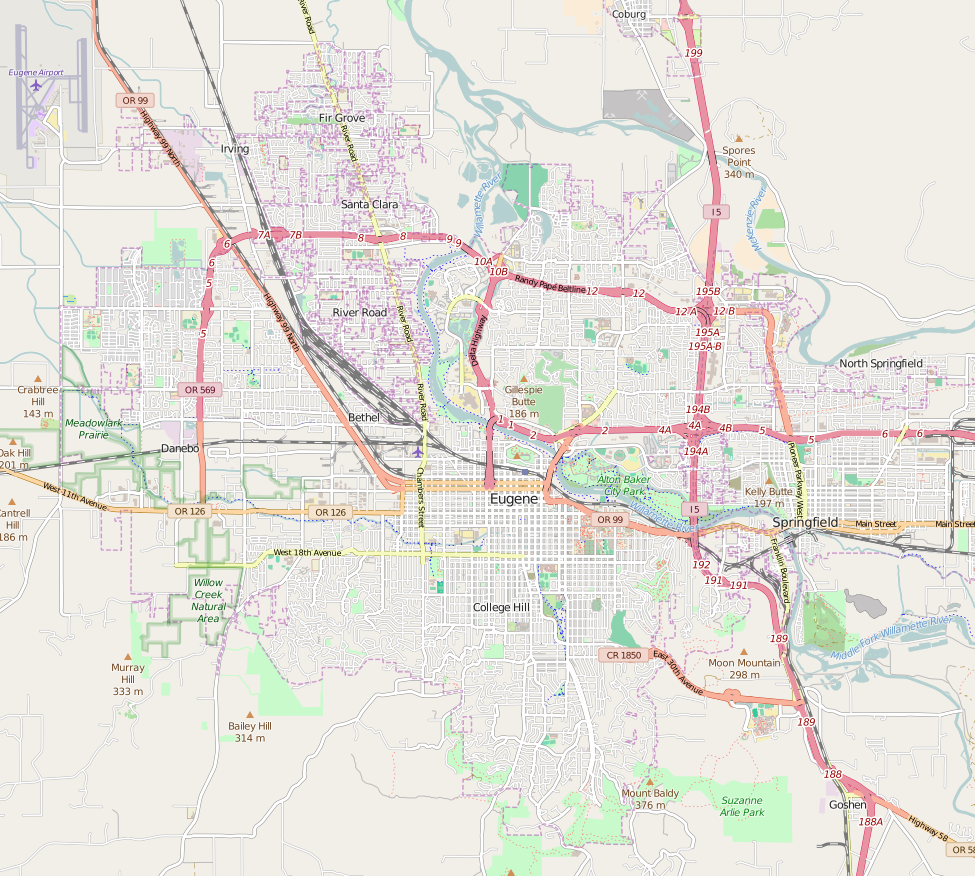
- Location within Eugene OR Location within Oregon
- Location: 1312 Lincoln Street, Eugene, Oregon
- Coordinates: 44°2′44″N 123°5′46″W
- Area: less than one acre
- Built: 1912
- Architect: Hunzicker, John
- Architectural style: Bungalow/craftsman
- MPS: Residential Architecture of Eugene, Oregon MPS
- NRHP reference No.: 03001181
- Added to NRHP: November 21, 2003

The Abraham and Phoebe Ball House, located in Eugene, Oregon, is listed on the National Register of Historic Places.

== See also ==
- National Register of Historic Places listings in Lane County, Oregon
