= Baldwin Market =

- U.S. National Register of Historic Places
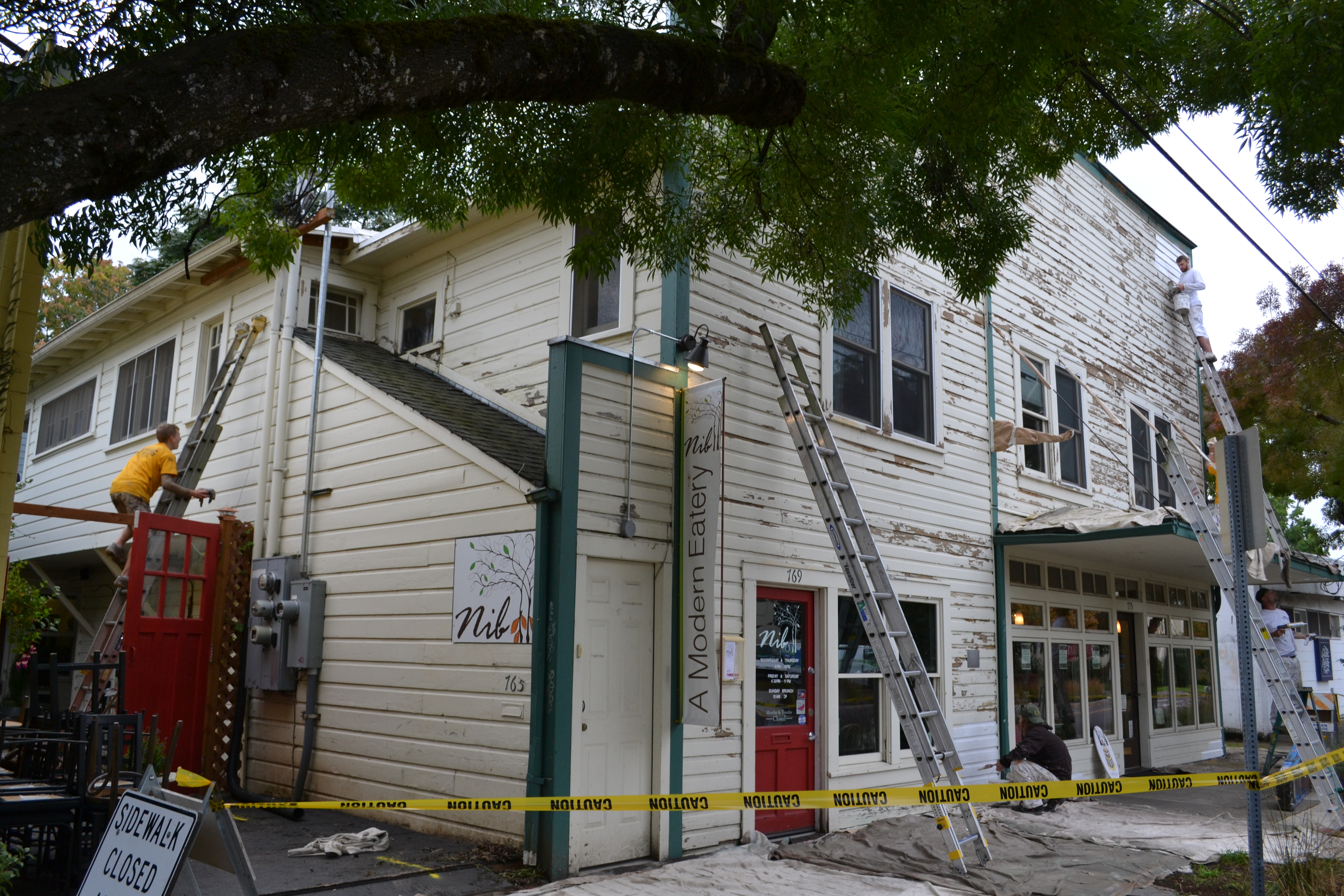
- The Baldwin Market in 2011

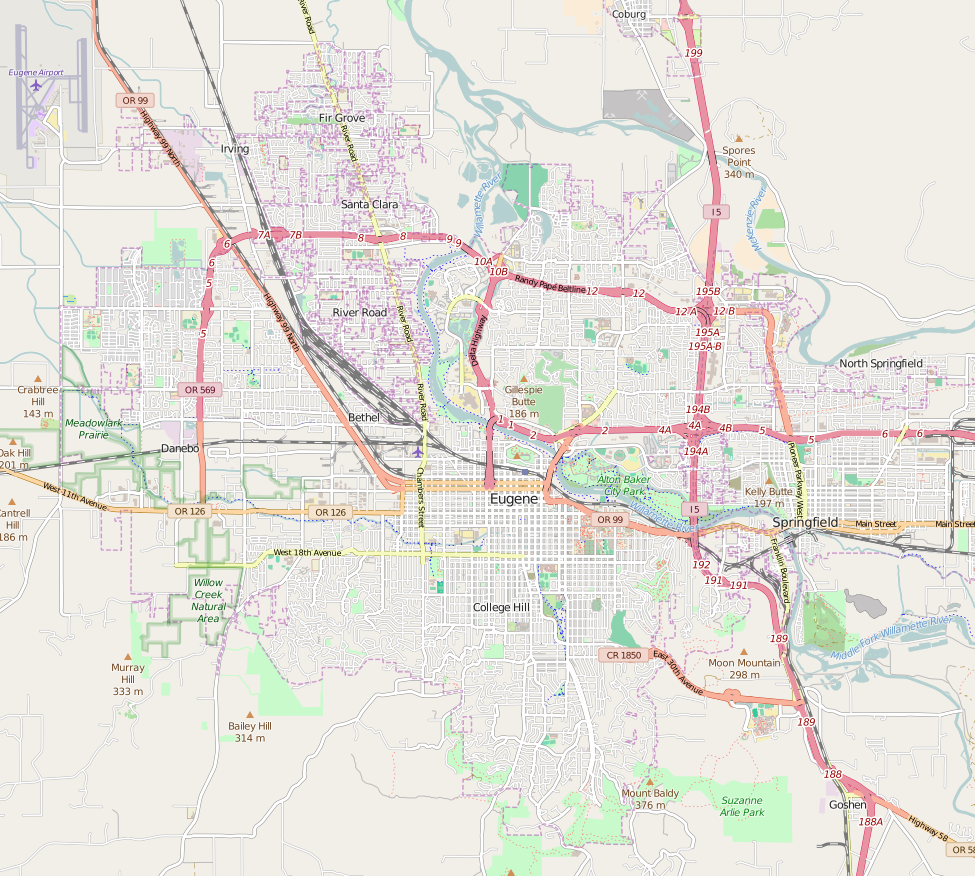
- Location within Eugene OR Location within Oregon
- Location: 765–781 Monroe Street; Eugene, Oregon
- Coordinates: 44°03′05″N 123°06′17″W
- Area: 0.09 acres (0.036 ha)
- Built: Before 1920
- Architectural style: Vernacular
- NRHP reference No.: 96000619
- Added to NRHP: May 29, 1996

The Baldwin Market building in 2026

The Baldwin Market is a historic retail shop building in Eugene, Oregon, United States.

== History ==
The building was constructed at some point between 1912 and 1920. It became the principal market - and therefore a community hub - in its neighbourhood between 1920, when it was renovated and established as a shop by Earl and Eva Baldwin, and 1946, when Jesse Ash and his family, who had acquired the building in 1941, sold it and moved their business to a nearby location to the south. It is now the only two-story false-fronted commercial building in Eugene, and therefore the only representative of the style which dominated Oregon's commercial wooden architecture during the 19th century.

The building was listed on the National Register of Historic Places in 1996. As of 2021, it houses a massage center and a cafe.

== See also ==
- National Register of Historic Places listings in Lane County, Oregon
