= Howard A. Hall House =

Historic house in Oregon, United States

- U.S. National Register of Historic Places
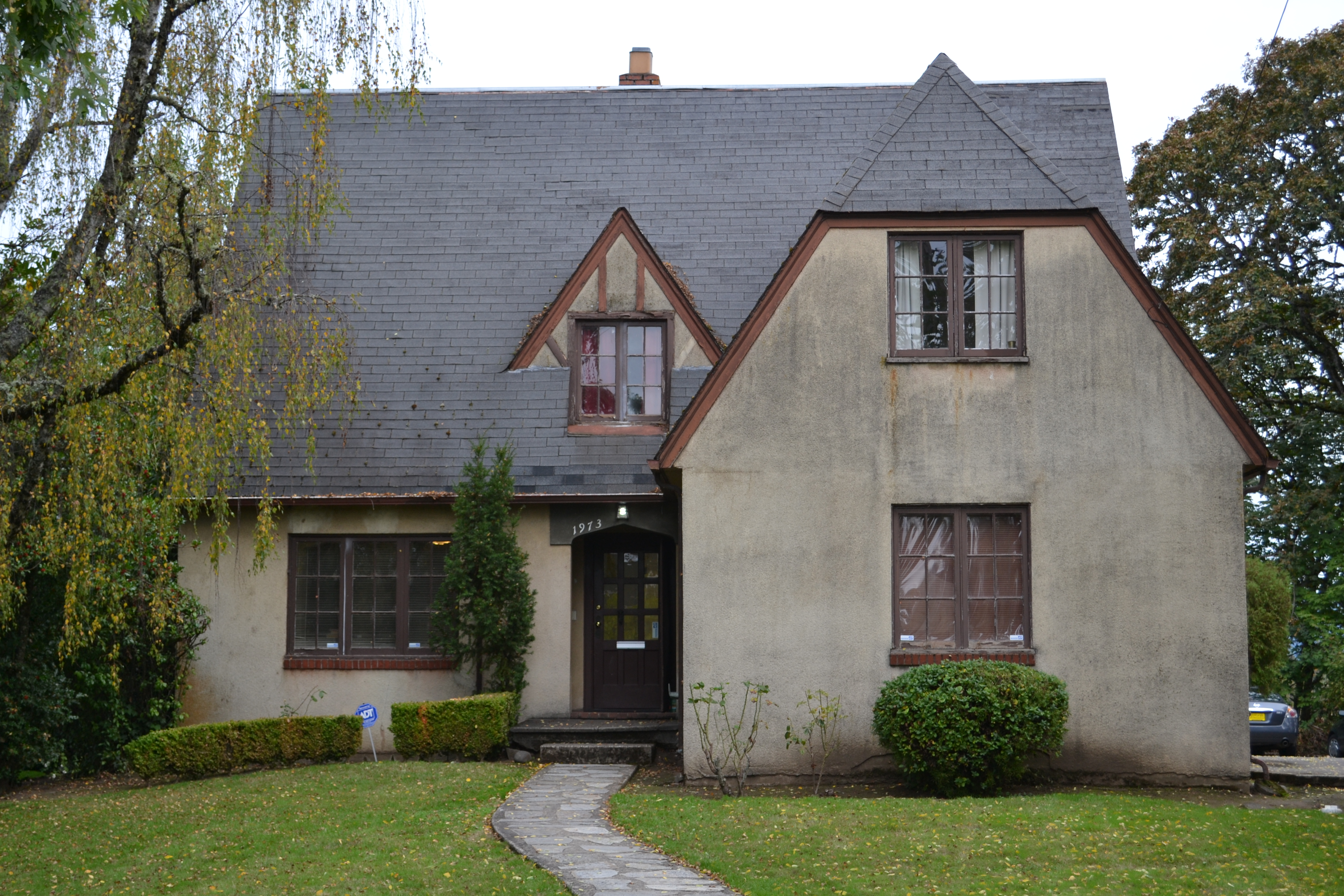
- The house in 2011

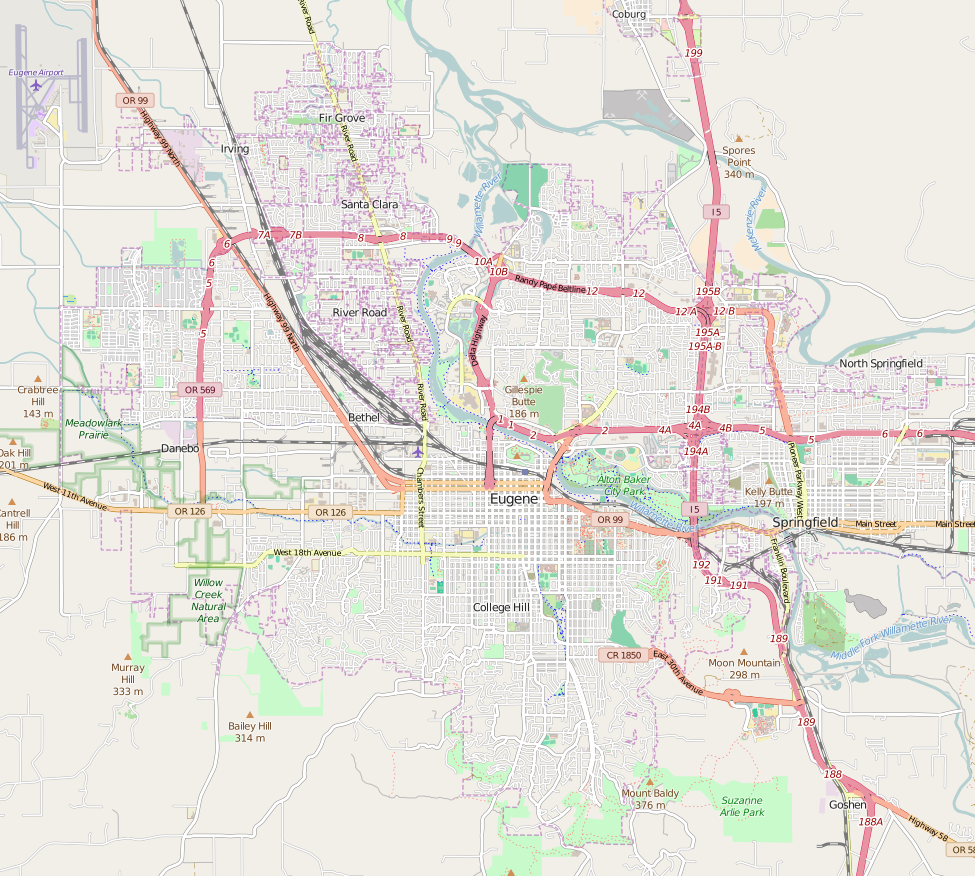
- Location within Eugene OR Location within Oregon Location within the United States
- Location: 1991 Garden Ave., Eugene, Oregon
- Coordinates: 44°2′48″N 123°3′41″W
- Built: 1922
- Built by: Slayton, Richard
- Architect: Hunzicker, John
- Architectural style: Tudor Revival, English Cottage
- NRHP reference No.: 88001036
- Added to NRHP: July 14, 1988

The Howard A. Hall House, located in Eugene, Oregon, is listed on the National Register of Historic Places.

== See also ==
- National Register of Historic Places listings in Lane County, Oregon
