= Wallace and Glenn Potter House =

Historic house in Oregon, United States

- U.S. National Register of Historic Places
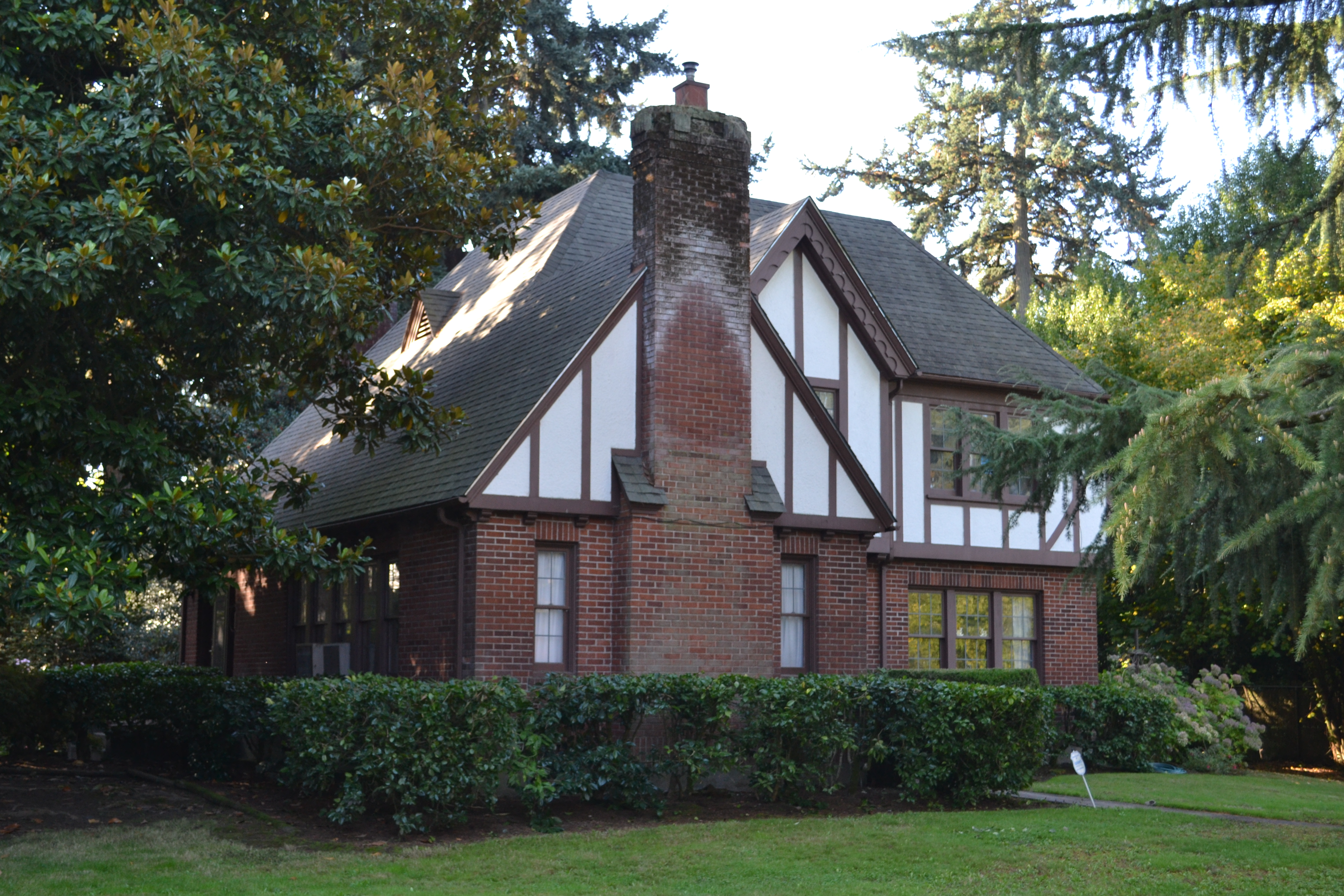
- The house in 2011

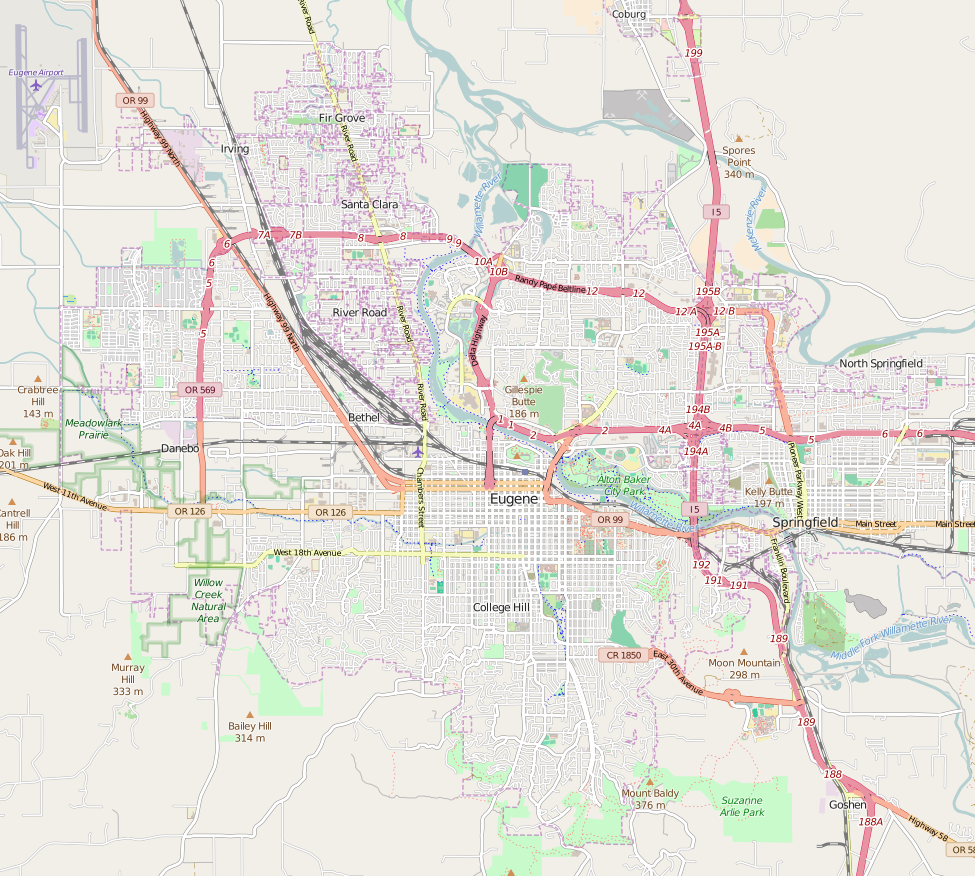
- Location within Eugene OR Location within Oregon
- Location: 120 Fir Ln, Eugene, Oregon
- Coordinates: 44°3′56″N 123°6′54″W
- Area: less than one acre
- Built: c. 1925 or 1928
- Architect: Hunzicker and Smith; Lindsay and Hargreaves
- Architectural style: Tudor Revival
- NRHP reference No.: 07000360
- Added to NRHP: April 24, 2007

The Wallace and Glenn Potter House, in Eugene, Oregon, United States, is a house listed on the National Register of Historic Places.

== See also ==
- National Register of Historic Places listings in Lane County, Oregon
