= Eugene Hotel =

- U.S. National Register of Historic Places
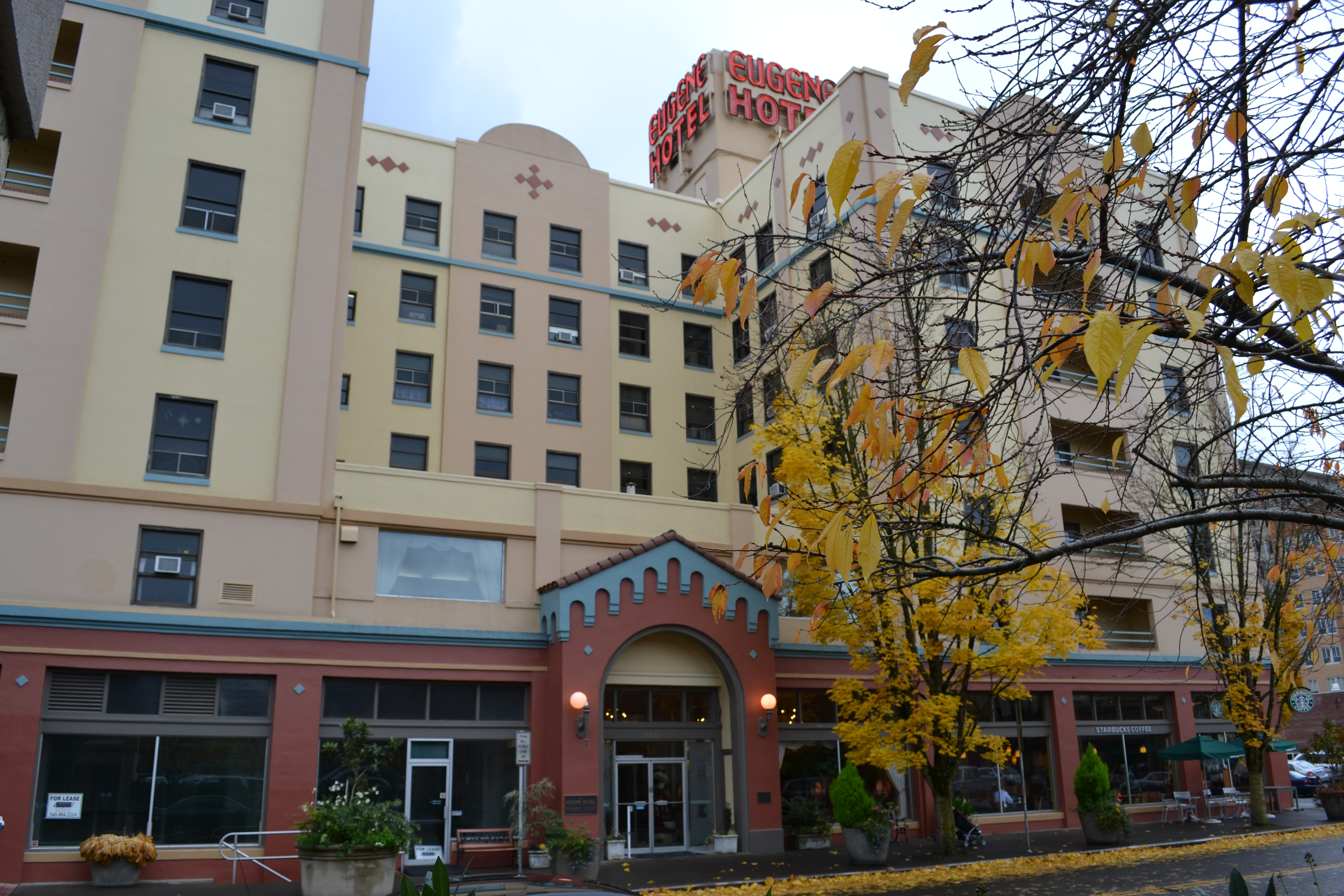

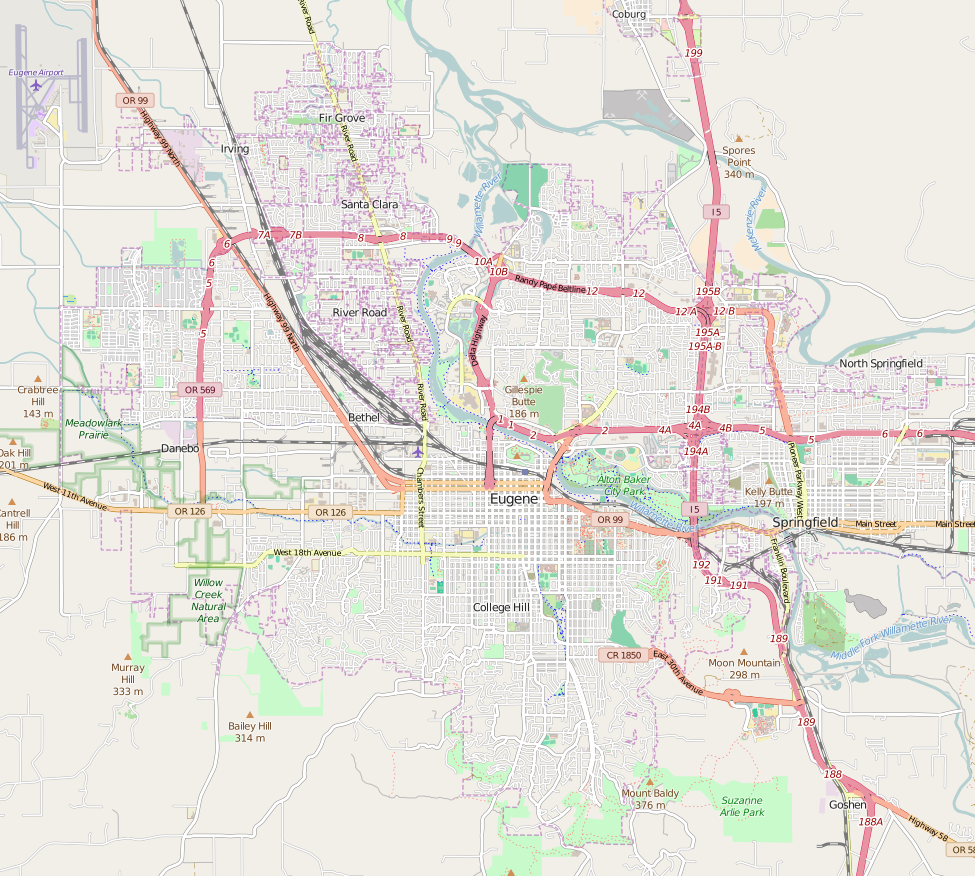
- Location within Eugene OR Location within Oregon
- Location: 222 E. Broadway; Eugene, Oregon
- Coordinates: 44°02′59″N 123°05′21″W
- Area: Less than 1 acre (0.40 ha)
- Built: 1925
- Architect: John Hunzicker
- Architectural style: Early Modern, with California Mission and Romanesque details
- Restored: 1983
- NRHP reference No.: 82001508
- Added to NRHP: October 7, 1982

The Eugene Hotel is a historic hotel building in Eugene, Oregon, United States.

The hotel was added to the National Register of Historic Places in 1982. In 1983, the building was adapted for use as retirement housing.

== See also ==
- National Register of Historic Places listings in Lane County, Oregon
