= Dorris Apartments =

- U.S. National Register of Historic Places
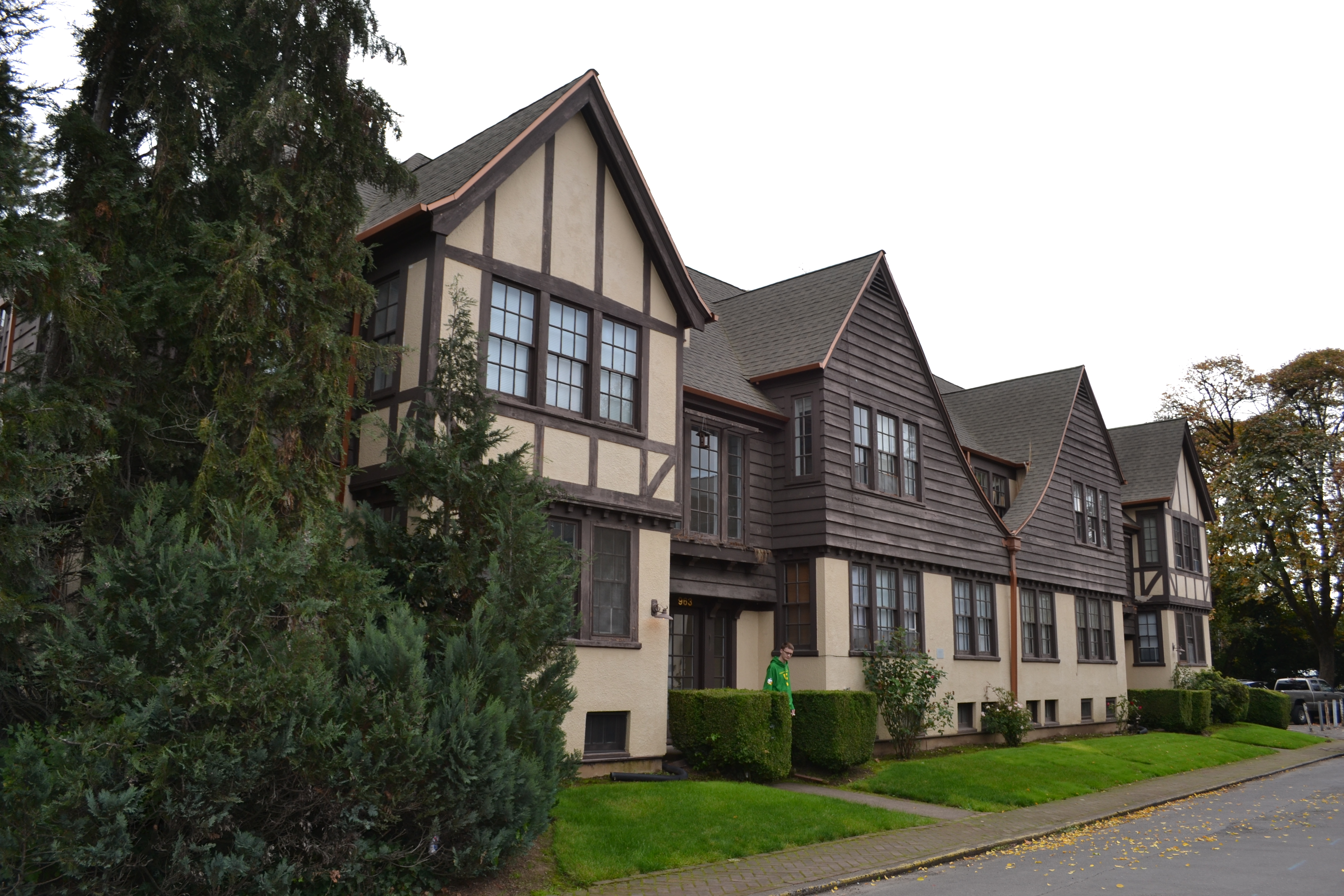
- The building in 2011

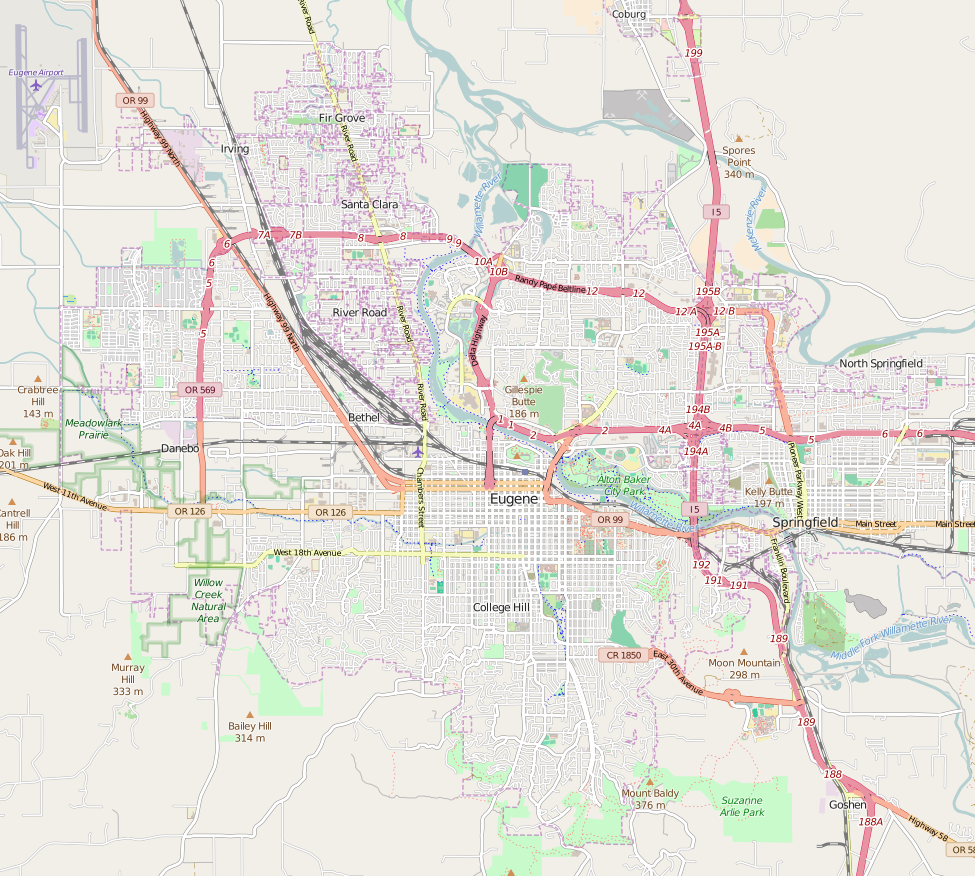
- Location within Eugene OR Location within Oregon
- Location: 963 Ferry Ln., Eugene, Oregon
- Coordinates: 44°2′57″N 123°5′0″W
- Area: 0.2 acres (0.081 ha)
- Built: 1927
- Architect: Hunzicker & Smith, et al.
- Architectural style: Tudor Revival
- MPS: Eugene West University Neighborhood MPS
- NRHP reference No.: 91001565
- Added to NRHP: October 24, 1991

The Dorris Apartments, located in Eugene, Oregon, are listed on the National Register of Historic Places.

== See also ==
- National Register of Historic Places listings in Lane County, Oregon
