= Quackenbush Hardware Store =

- U.S. National Register of Historic Places
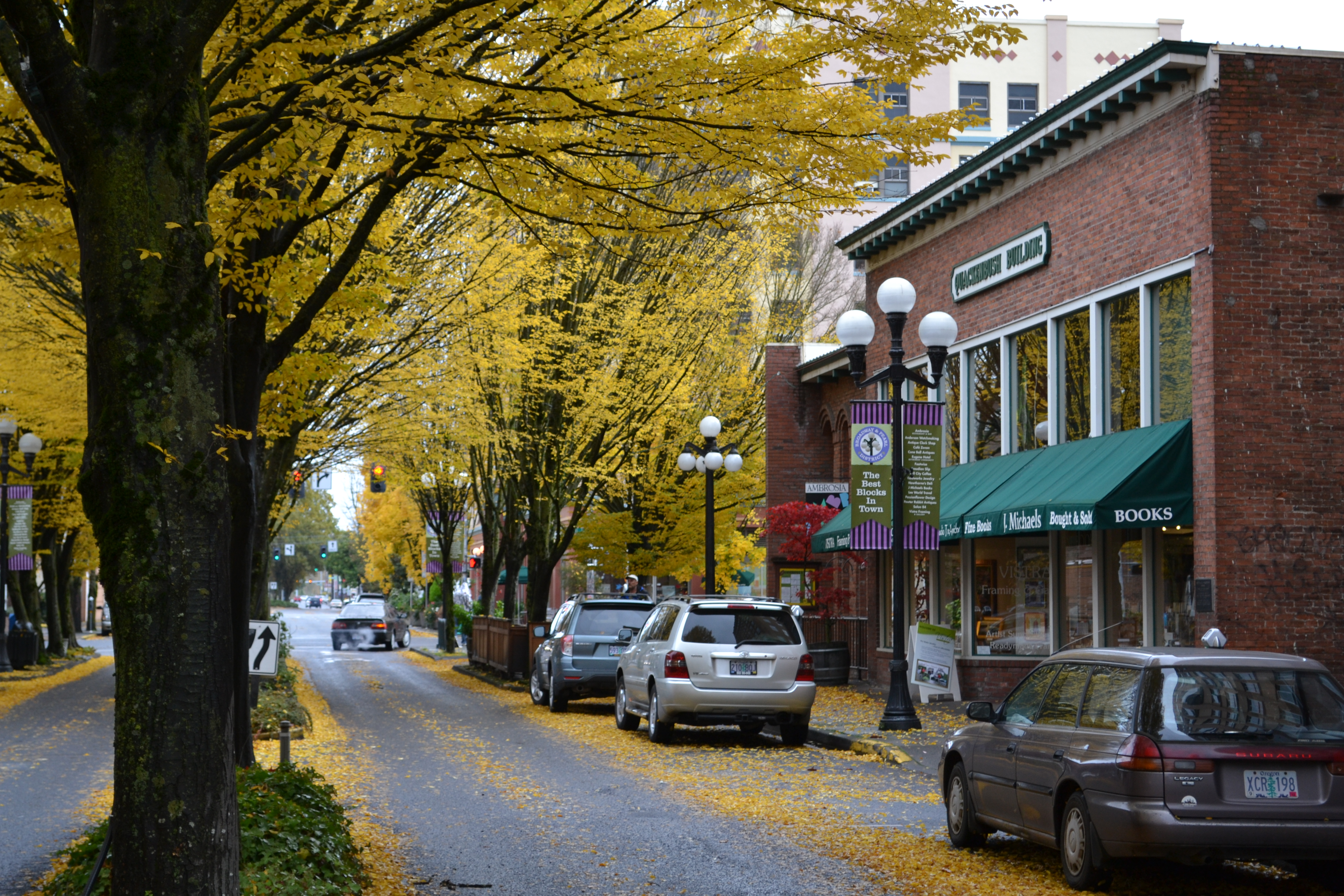
- The Quackenbush Building in 2011
- Location: 160 East Broadway; Eugene, Oregon
- Coordinates: 44°02′59″N 123°05′25″W
- Built: 1903
- Architectural style: American commercial
- NRHP reference No.: 82003734
- Added to NRHP: September 23, 1982

The Quackenbush Hardware Store, located in Eugene, Oregon, is listed on the National Register of Historic Places. The store opened in 1903 under the name J. W. Quackenbush's, selling farm implements, hardware, and horse-drawn vehicles. Gradually the inventory shifted to kitchen items and dinnerware, toys, and gift items. The store closed in 1980.

The 1.5-story building is of red brick construction in an American stretcher bond, commercial style characterized by large display windows on the ground floor. The architect and builder are unknown. In 1969 the building was saved from urban renewal demolition by a group of concerned citizens.

== See also ==
- National Register of Historic Places listings in Lane County, Oregon
