= Clarence and Ethel Boyer House =

Historic house in Oregon, United States

- U.S. National Register of Historic Places
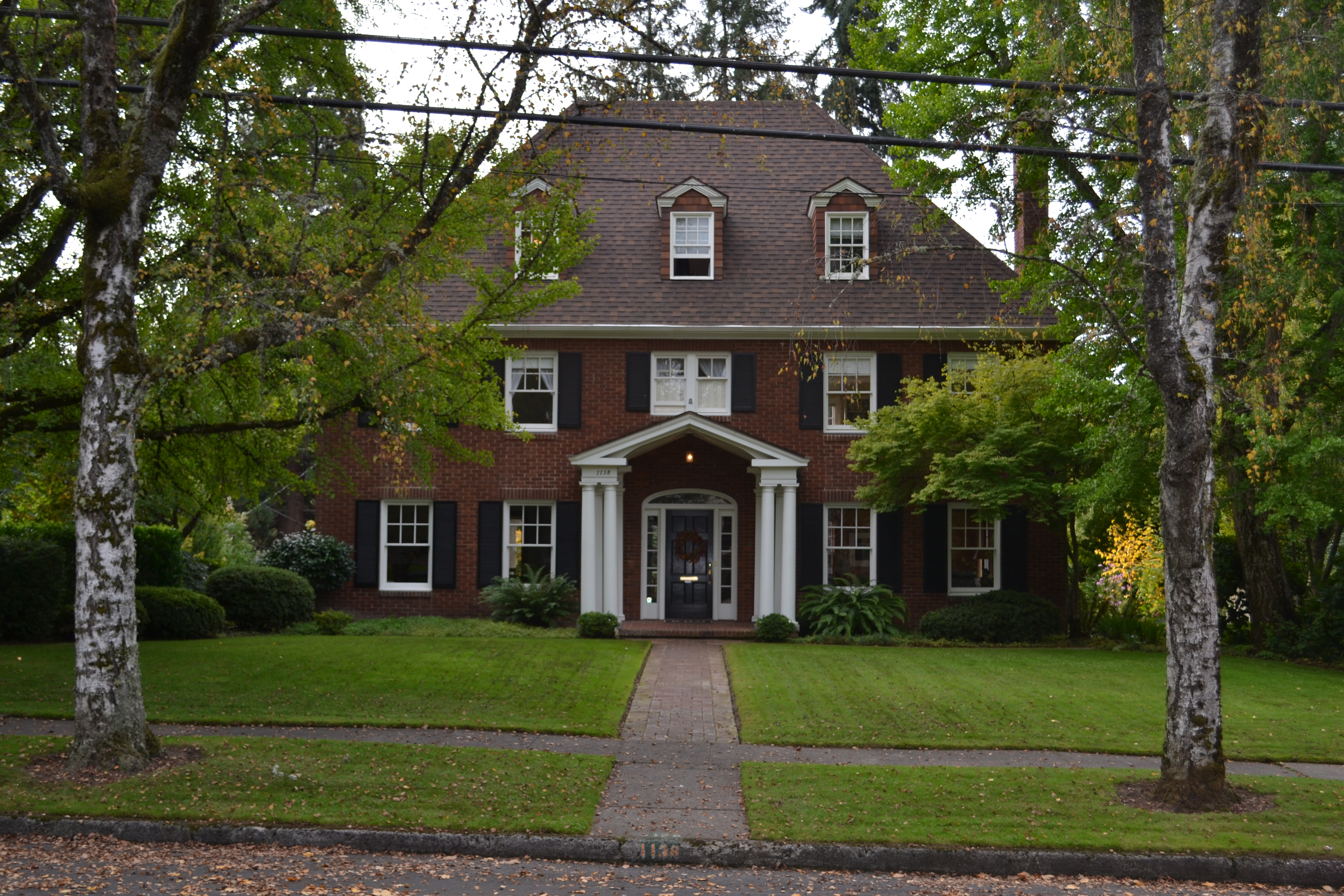

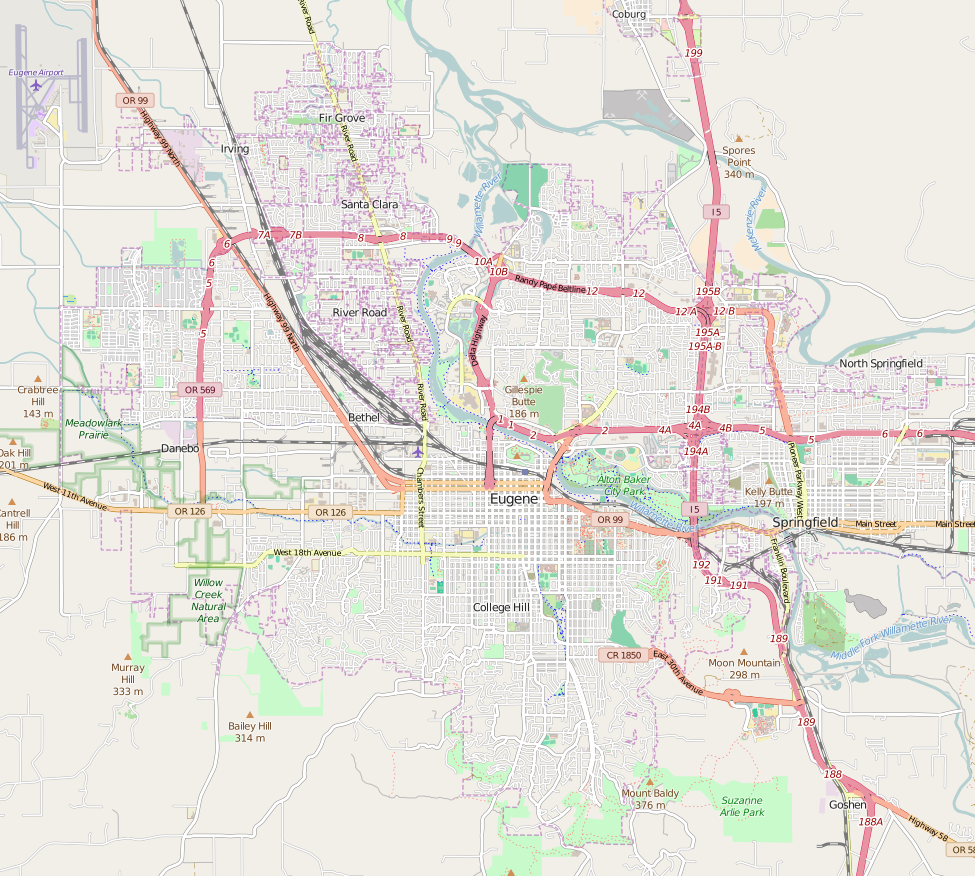
- Location within Eugene OR Location within Oregon
- Location: 1138 E. 22nd Ave., Eugene, Oregon
- Coordinates: 44°2′8″N 123°4′28″W
- Area: less than one acre
- Built: 1927
- Built by: Arnt Ree
- Architect: George York
- Architectural style: Colonial Revival
- NRHP reference No.: 09000061
- Added to NRHP: February 25, 2009

The Clarence and Ethel Boyer House, located in Eugene, Oregon, is listed on the National Register of Historic Places.

== See also ==
- National Register of Historic Places listings in Lane County, Oregon
