= Springfield General Hospital =

Historic building in Springfield, Oregon, U.S.

- U.S. National Register of Historic Places
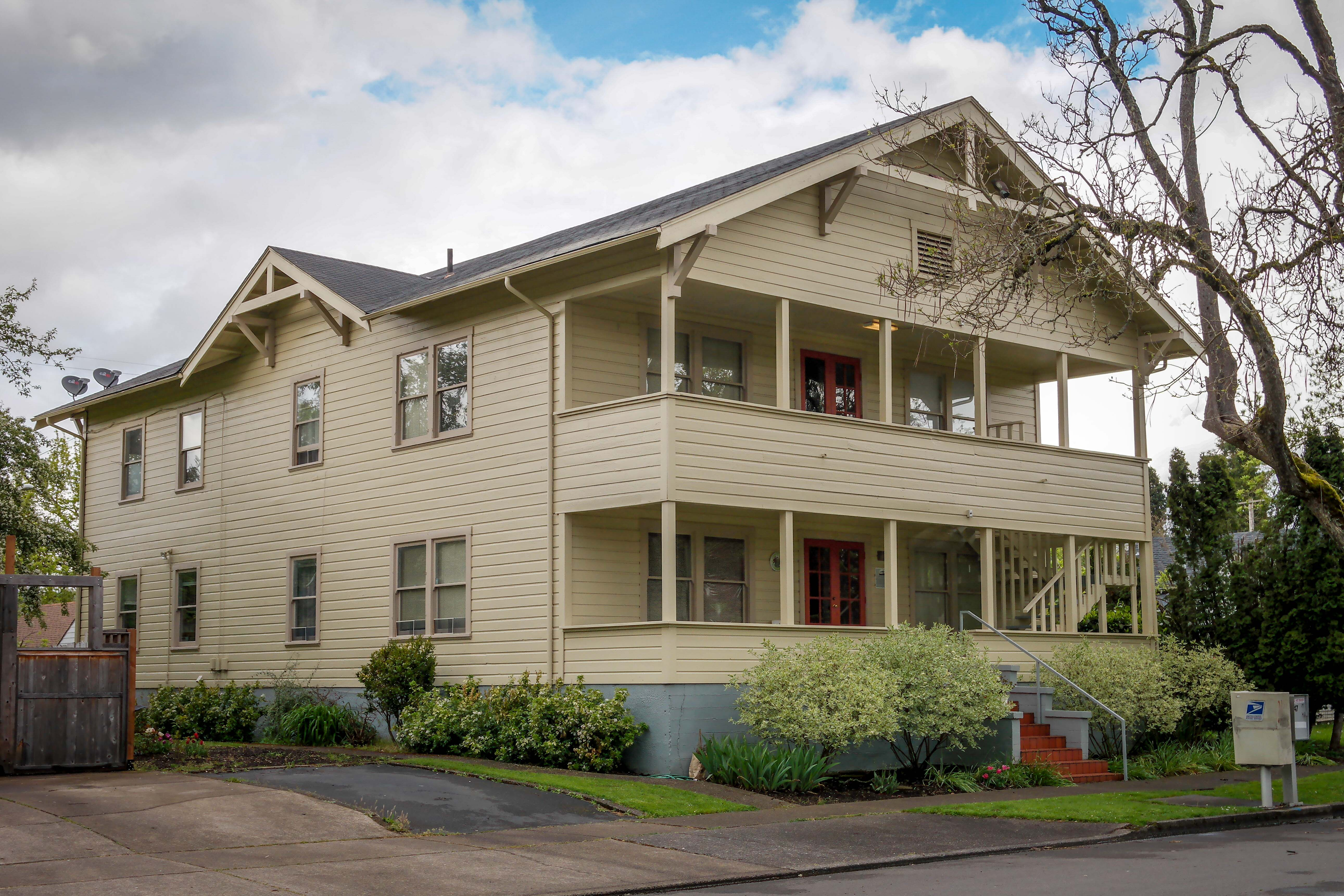

- Location within Oregon Location within the United States
- Location: 846 F St., Springfield, Oregon
- Coordinates: 44°03′06″N 123°00′47″W
- Area: less than one acre
- Built: 1914
- Architectural style: Bungalow/craftsman
- NRHP reference No.: 83002159
- Added to NRHP: September 1, 1983

The Springfield General Hospital, located in Springfield, Oregon, is listed on the National Register of Historic Places. The hospital was established in 1913.

== See also ==
- National Register of Historic Places listings in Lane County, Oregon
