= Jacob Clearwater House =

- U.S. National Register of Historic Places
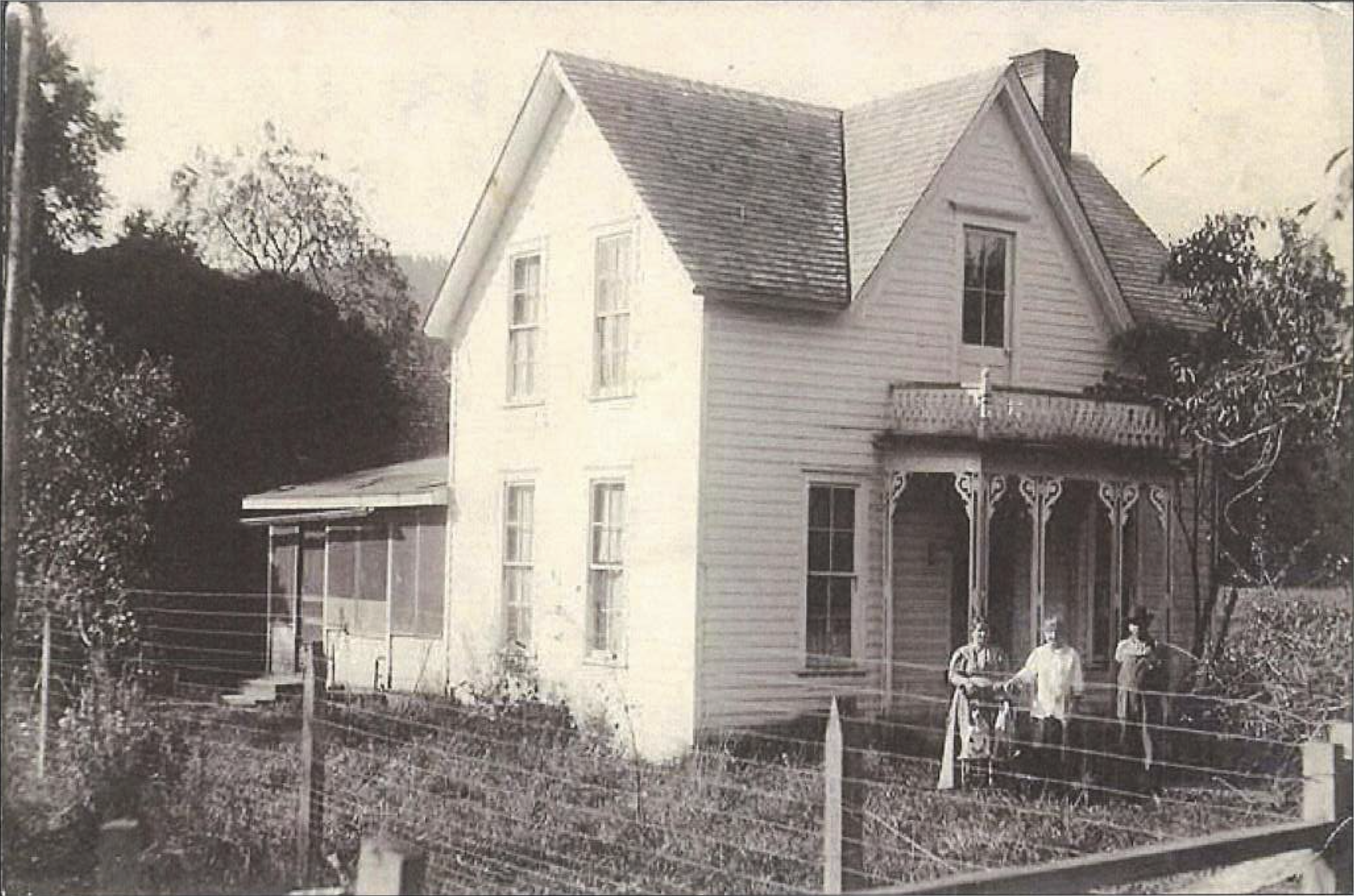
- Photograph of the Jacob Clearwater House, taken around 1890.

- Location within Oregon Location within the United States
- Location: 1656 Clearwater Lane, Springfield, Oregon
- Coordinates: 44°01′35″N 122°57′04″W
- Area: 43 acres (17 ha)
- NRHP reference No.: 100001273
- Added to NRHP: July 3, 2017

The Jacob Clearwater House in Springfield, Oregon was listed on the National Register of Historic Places in 2017.

It was home to the Clearwater family who transited the Oregon Trail and homesteaded 320 acres (1.3 km^{2}) in 1865 along the Middle Fork of the Willamette River. It was built in 1874 and is one of only four houses from 1874 or before in the Springfield area.

It is a Gothic Revival-style house.

The listing includes 43 acres (17 ha) of land containing the house and a historic water tower. The water tower is 10 by 10 feet (3.0 m × 3.0 m) in plan.
