= Walden, Oregon =

Unincorporated community in the state of Oregon, United States

- Unincorporated community
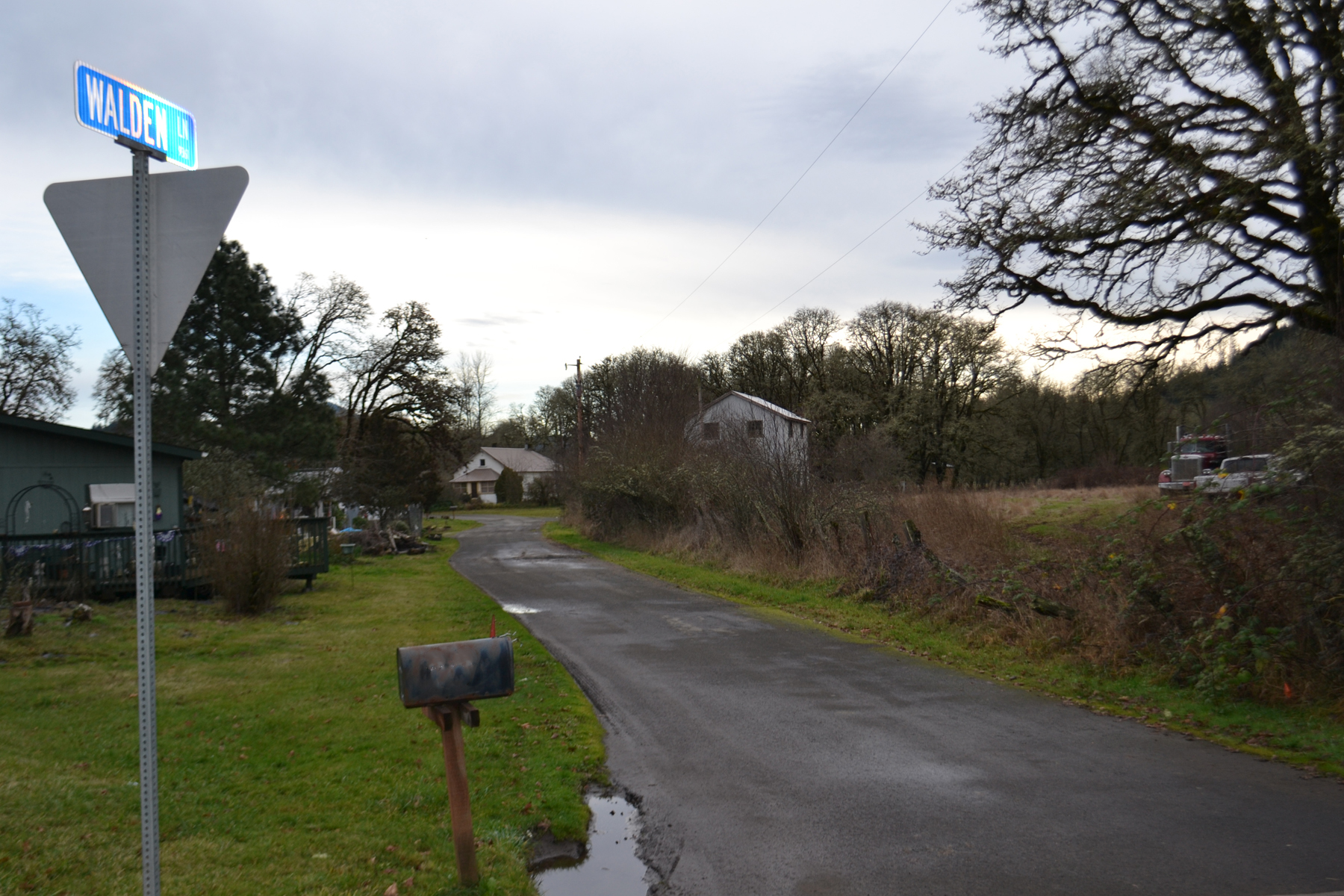
- Walden Lane in Walden, Oregon

- Location within Oregon Location within the United States
- Coordinates: 43°46′34″N 123°00′19″W
- Country: United States
- State: Oregon
- County: Lane
- Elevation: 689 ft (210 m)
- Time zone: UTC-8 (Pacific (PST))
  - Summer (DST): UTC-7 (PDT)
- ZIP codes: 97424
- GNIS feature ID: 1153709

Walden is an unincorporated community in Lane County, Oregon, United States. The community is approximately 3 miles (5 km) southeast of Cottage Grove, near the confluence of the Row River and Mosby Creek.

Walden was a station on the Oregon and Southeastern Railroad (now converted to the Row River Trail). According to state representative and local lumber company owner L. L. "Stub" Stewart, the station was named for a family of early residents in the area. There is a Nathan B. Walden listed in the 1880 Census for the Cottage Grove Precinct. The 1973 film Emperor of the North was shot in the Walden area along the rail line.

The Brumbaugh covered bridge, a National Register of Historic Places property, once stood near Walden, spanning Mosby Creek. It was dismantled and the wood used in the Centennial Covered Bridge in Cottage Grove. The Stewart and Mosby Creek bridges still stand in the Walden area, as well as the historic Walden Store & Gas Station building, built circa 1900. The store closed in about 2002.

== Notable people ==
Opal Whiteley and her grandparents lived in Walden; Opal mentioned the area in her book The Diary of Opal Whiteley.
