= Row River National Recreation Trail =

Rail trail in Lane County, Oregon, U.S.

Coordinates: 43°47′52″N 123°03′26″W

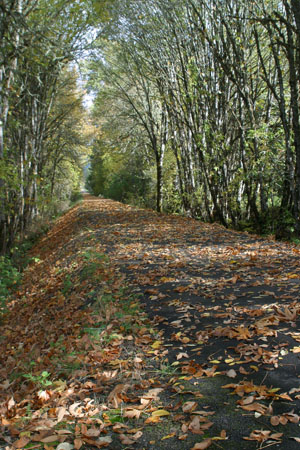
The trail in fall

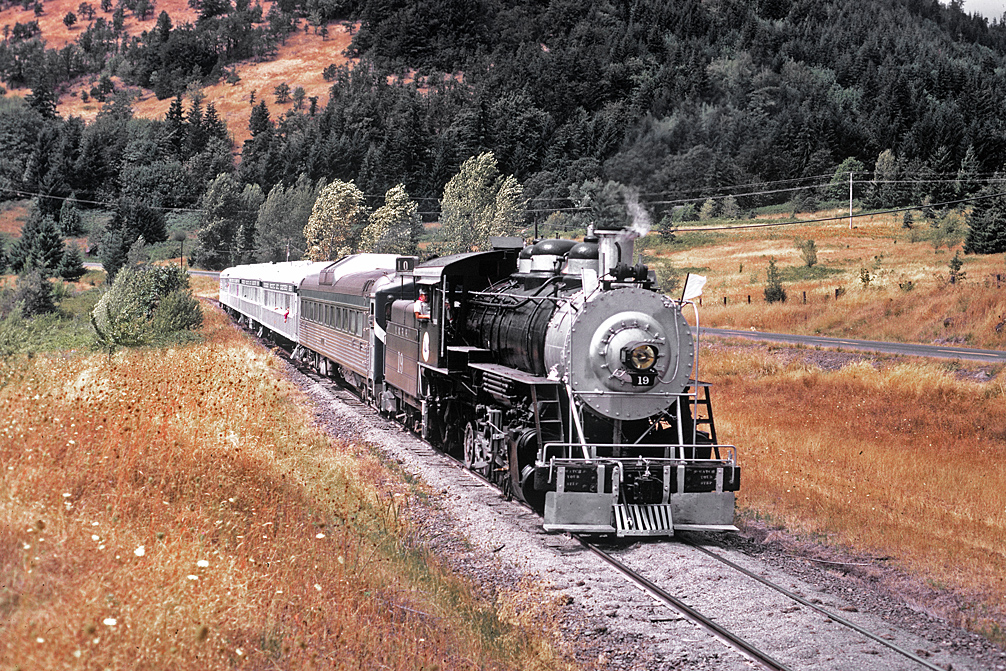
Oregon, Pacific and Eastern Railway train entering Dorena, Oregon, 1971. This line was closed in 1987, and is now the Row River Trail.

Row River National Recreation Trail is a rail trail in the U.S. state of Oregon. It follows the Row River for 16.2 miles (26.1 km) between Cottage Grove and Culp Creek, passing by Dorena Lake, and provides access to many forest trails of Umpqua National Forest.

The rail line was built to serve the gold and silver mining of the Bohemia mining district well up the Row River. The mines were closing by the time the rail line was complete, but the region's old-growth timber attracted many logging operations and communities that kept the rail line busy. The Oregon Pacific & Eastern Railway abandoned the line in 1994. A timber sale default resulted in the Bureau of Land Management taking the rail corridor in exchange for payment.

There are three historic covered bridges near the trail: the Mosby Creek Bridge of 1920, Currin Bridge of 1925, and the Dorena Bridge of 1949.

Several movies have been filmed along the route, including 1926's The General with Buster Keaton, 1974's Emperor of the North (Pole) with Lee Marvin and Ernest Borgnine, and 1986's Stand by Me with Keifer Sutherland and River Phoenix.
