= Oregon, Pacific and Eastern Railway =

Abandoned U.S. short line railroad

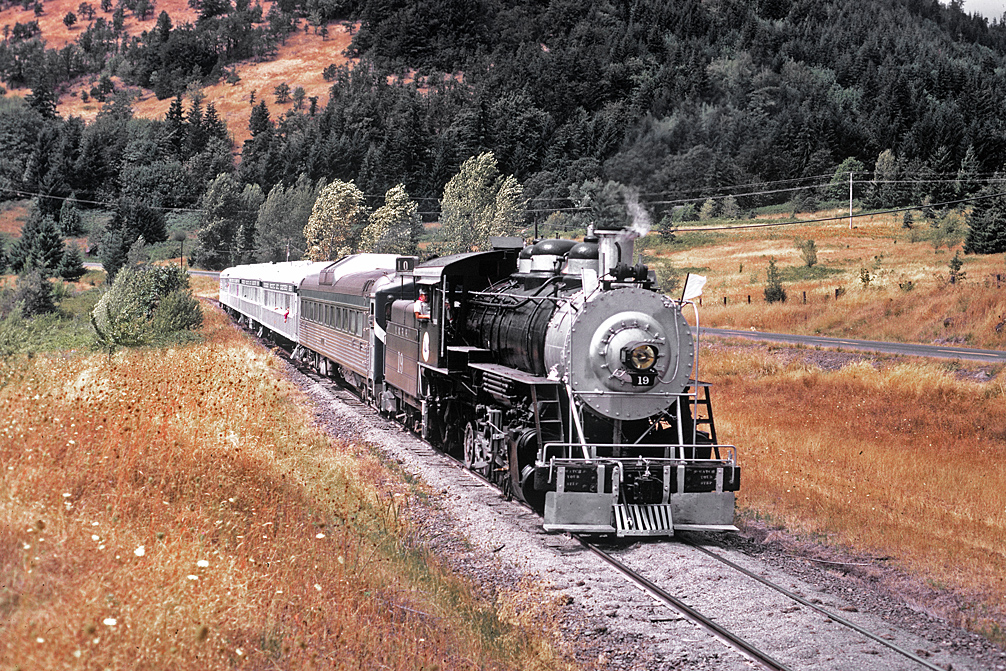
- OPE train, hauled by McCloud Railway 19, entering Dorena, Oregon in 1971. This line closed in 1987, and is now the Row River Trail.

Overview
- Headquarters: Cottage Grove, Oregon, Roseburg, Oregon
- Reporting mark: OPE
- Locale: Oregon
- Dates of operation: 1904–1994
- Successor: Row River Trail, 2001

Technical
- Track gauge: 4 ft 8 1/2 in (1,435 mm) standard gauge
- Length: 18 miles (29 km)

The Oregon, Pacific and Eastern Railway (reporting mark OPE) was an Oregon-based short line railroad that began near Eugene as the Oregon and Southeastern Railroad (O&SE) in 1904. O&SE's line ran 18 miles (29 km) along the Row River between the towns of Cottage Grove and Disston. The Oregon, Pacific & Eastern Railway Company incorporated in 1912, purchased the physical assets of the O&SE two years later, and shortened their total trackage to operate 16.6 miles (26.7 km) from an interchange yard with the Southern Pacific Railroad at Cottage Grove, east to a 528' x 156' turnaround loop at Culp Creek. The last of this track was closed and scrapped in 1994, and ownership of its abandoned right of way property was later reverted to the state of Oregon to become one of the first-ever Government/Private Sector cooperative partnership Rails to Trails programs in the US, forming the Row River National Recreation Trail. A successor corporation now operates a communications company and a narrow-gauge line at Wildlife Safari.

== History ==
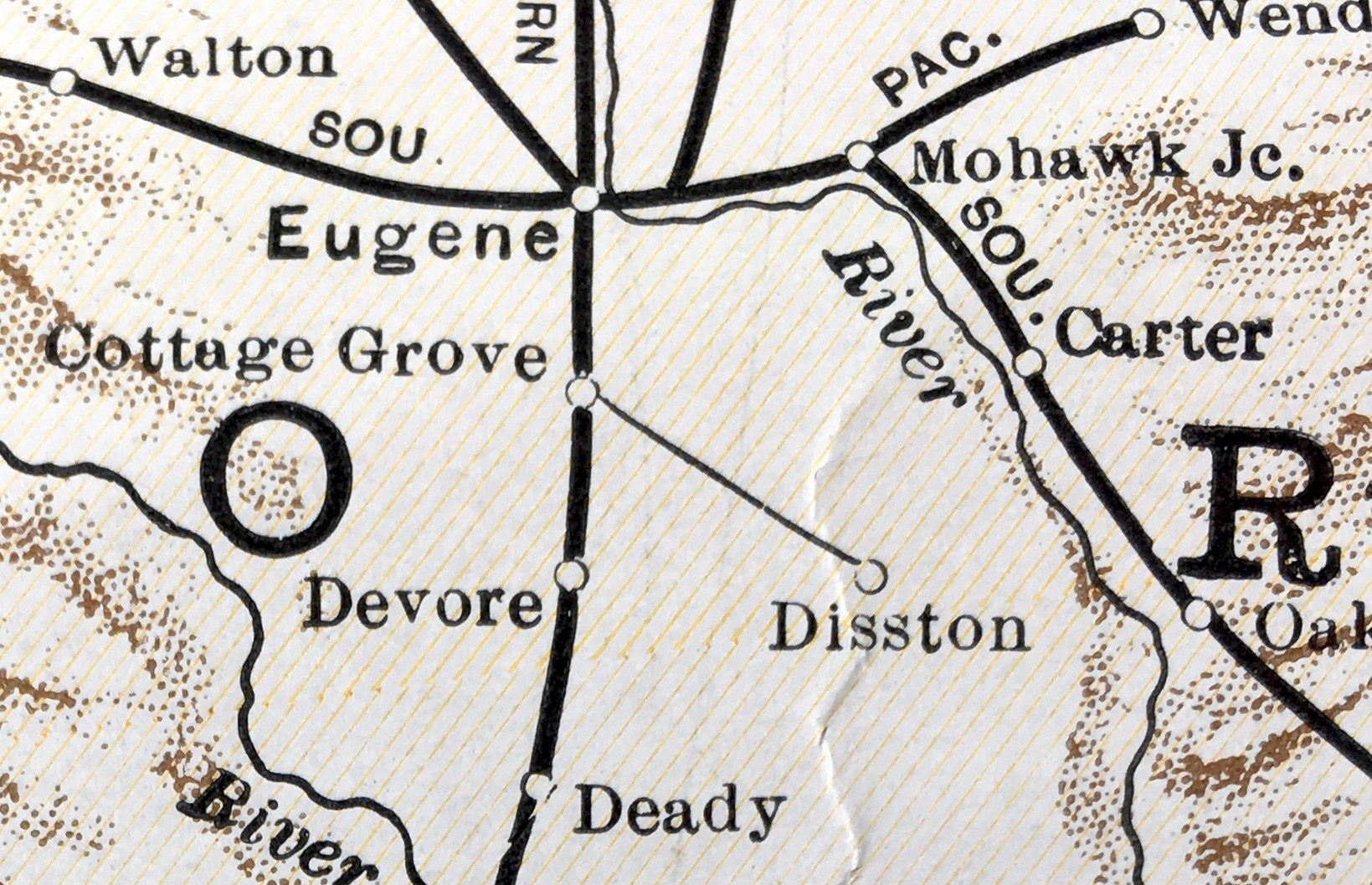
Route in 1930

=== Industrial origins ===
The O&SE (locally known as the Old, Slow & Easy) was built to serve the gold, silver, copper, zinc, and lead mines in the Bohemia mining district of Mid-Coastal Oregon's Willamette River Valley. Sawmills were built along the route as soon as transportation was available for the lumber they would produce, but traffic was seldom sufficient to encourage investment in new equipment. Covered bridges were built at Walden, Currin, and Wildwood to prevent rot after a train fell through the wooden bridge into the inland Row River on 5 June 1909, at Currin.

In 1912, J.H. Chambers Lumber Company was a major investor when the line was reorganized as the OP&E. The OP&E built a 6-mile (9.7 km) logging branch from Disston up Layng Creek in 1914, and in 1917, Chambers' Lumber company secured complete control of OP&E. As an economy move, Chambers built a gasoline-powered railbus to replace the daily passenger train. This "Galloping Goose" began operation on 1 April 1917 and remained the only passenger service until replaced by a thrice weekly mixed train under different ownership in March, 1929.

=== Post-WWI, silver screen stardom, and the Great Depression ===
The Anderson-Middleton Lumber Company purchased OP&E from Chambers in 1924, and built a new sawmill (today's Weyerhauser), south of Cottage Grove. The logging branch up Layng Creek was dismantled, and the rail relaid to form a new branch up to Herman Creek. Locomotive #8 and a trainload of logs fell through Walden bridge into Mosby Creek on 5 September 1924, killing both the engineer, and brakeman.

In 1925, Buster Keaton used the railway for his 1926 silent film classic The General. OP&E locomotives played the parts of #3 General, #5 Texas, and a Union Army locomotive pulling "Civil War coaches" (former Pacific Electric street cars specifically rebuilt for the film by the movie company). Local National Guard soldiers were hired to wear Civil War uniforms, and filming battle scenes caused several fires including one that destroyed the Red Bridge Station. The most exciting fire was the intentional destruction of the Texas scene, on a bridge the movie company built over the Row River, filming of which was scheduled on July 4 for the enjoyment of local spectators, and resulted in a rousing success.

Anderson-Middleton Lumber Company went bankrupt in 1930, and OP&E struggled through the Great Depression with only 7 employees until increasing lumber demand finally caused sawmills to resume operations in the late 1930s. The company reorganized under the same name in 1940, and resumed daily service. The Texas Locomotive #5 would remain in the Row River until the Japanese' military preparations in 1941 raised the price of scrap iron just before World War II.

=== Post WWII, more film fame, abandonment, and reclamation ===
Damming of the Row River in 1947 to form Dorena Reservoir required the United States Army Corps of Engineers to relocate approximately 8 miles (13 km) of track above the north side of the reservoir. The Wildwood covered bridge was replaced with a steel girder span in 1948, and the other two covered bridges were similarly replaced in 1950, as Booth-Kelly Lumber Company built a 7.2-mile (11.6 km) logging branch up Mosby Creek and also purchased OP&E. Rails were removed from the track east of Culp Creek in 1954 after two sawmills in Disston ceased operations. After steam-powered excursion trains were run 18–19 July 1959 to celebrate the Oregon Centennial, Georgia-Pacific purchased Booth-Kelly (including OP&E) in 1959.

Georgia-Pacific sold OP&E in 1970 to Willis B. Kyle, who formed the Row River Investment Company (jointly owned by Kyle Railroad predecessor Kyle Railways and Bohemia, Inc.).

During the Summer of 1972, 20th Century Fox's 1973 motion picture Emperor of the North Pole, starring Lee Marvin, Ernest Borgnine, Keith Carradine, (and also including Vic Tayback, Charles Tyner, Simon Oakland, Elisha Cook Jr., Liam Dunn, & Matt Clark) was filmed along the railroad's right-of-way using some of the company's equipment, including Kyle's 1915-built 90 ton Baldwin (serial number 42000) 2-8-2 logging steam locomotive No. 19. The film was released on DVD as Emperor of the North in 2006. In 1985, Stand By Me, Rob Reiner's motion picture of a Stephen King novelette, was also filmed along the railroad's right of way.

In March 1986, the company owned a total of three locomotives, 31 boxcars, and 44 flatcars. All of that fleet is gone, except for an old GE 44-ton switcher.

Bohemia Incorporated bought out the railroad in Cottage Grove from Kyle in 1987. Kyle's 1915 Baldwin 2-8-2 locomotive No. 19 was returned to the Yreka Western Railroad (another Kyle owned railroad) in California that same year. In 1994, Bohemia discontinued service along the entire 17 mile OP&E line, the Oregon Pacific & Eastern Railway was dissolved as a corporation on December 19, 1994, the line was then abandoned, taken up as scrap, and the right of way and easements transformed into a hiking and bicycling nature preserve, the Row River National Recreation Trail.

== Locomotives ==
Number	Builder	Type	Built	Notes
1st No. 1	Baldwin Locomotive Works	4-4-0	1881	purchased from the Oregon Railroad and Navigation Company in 1902
2nd No. 1	Baldwin Locomotive Works	2-6-2 Tank locomotive	1925	purchased from the Anderson-Middleton Lumber Company in 1928
2	Baldwin Locomotive Works	2-6-0	1871	purchased from the Oregon Railroad and Navigation Company in 1902
3	Cooke Locomotive and Machine Works	2-6-0	1872	purchased from the Salem, Falls City and Western Railway in 1909
4	Cooke Locomotive and Machine Works	4-4-0	1886	purchased from the Corvallis & Eastern RR in 1902
1st No. 5	Baldwin Locomotive Works	4-4-0	1881	purchased from the Mount Hood Railroad
2nd No. 5	American Locomotive Company	2-8-0	1922	purchased from the Magma Arizona Railroad in 1972
6	Baldwin Locomotive Works	2-6-0	1882	purchased from the Southern Pacific in 1902
7	Baldwin Locomotive Works	2-6-0	1880	purchased from the Salem, Falls City and Western Railway in 1916
8	Rhode Island Locomotive Works	4-6-0	1888	purchased from the Dallas Locomotive and Machine Works in 1924
1st No. 9	Cooke Locomotive and Machine Works	4-4-0	1886	purchased from the Corvallis & Eastern RR in 1902
2nd No. 9	Lima Locomotive Works	Shay locomotive	1906	purchased from the Anderson-Middleton Lumber Company in 1928
3rd No. 9	Richmond Locomotive Works	2-6-2 Tank locomotive	1909	purchased from the Dallas Locomotive and Machine Works in 1941
10	General Electric	Diesel locomotive	1952	purchased new from General Electric in 1952
11	General Electric	Diesel locomotive	1941	purchased from the Monongahela Connecting Railroad in 1953
12	General Electric	Diesel locomotive	1955	purchased from the Port of Tacoma in 1973
14	General Electric	Diesel locomotive	1949	purchased from the Southern Pacific in 1975
19	Baldwin Locomotive Works	2-8-2	1915	leased from the Yreka Western Railroad in 1971
100	Budd Company	Budd Rail Diesel Car ("RDC-1")	1954	Southern Pacific in 1971
112	Lima Locomotive Works	Shay locomotive	1970	Sold in 1978

== Gallery ==
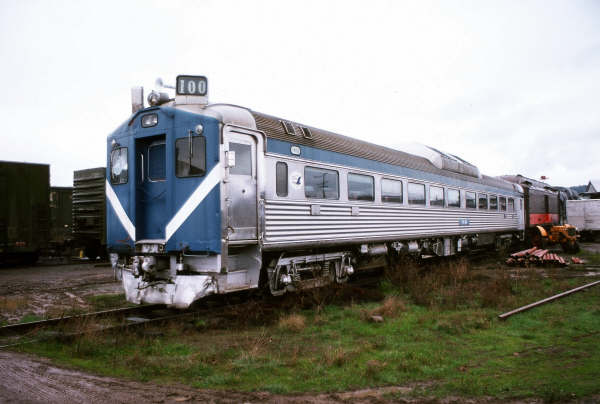
OP&E 100

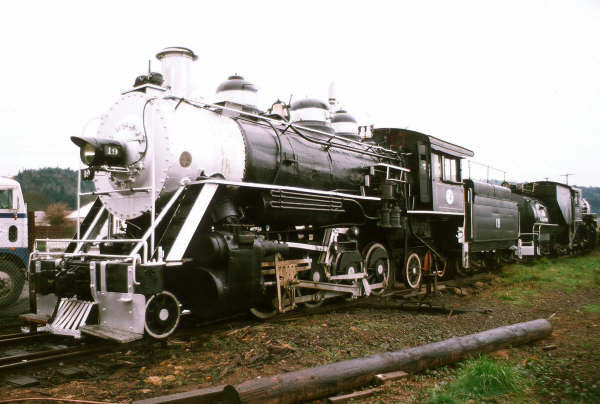
OP&E 19, a 1915-built, 90 ton Baldwin 2-8-2 logging locomotive moved from Yreka, California to 'Age of Steam Roundhouse' in Sugarcreek, Ohio on June 2, 2017 known as "The No. 19", and/or "Shack's Train", in 20th Century Fox's 1973 film, Emperor of the North Pole, and later in the 1986 Rob Reiner coming-of-age film, Stand by Me; it was used in a scene were one of the main characters plays chicken with No. 19..

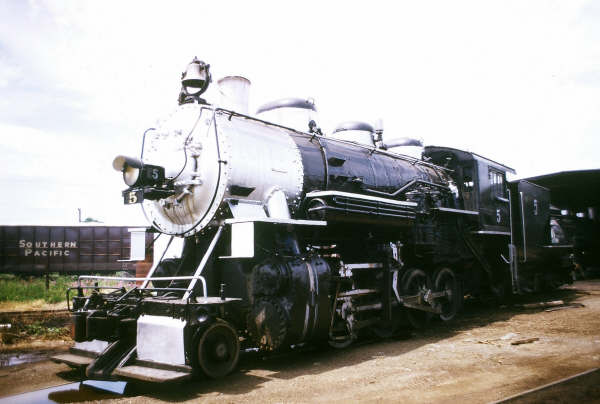
OP&E 5, a 1922-built ALCO 2-8-0 Consolidation locomotive currently in the Galveston Railroad Museum (as "Center for Transportation and Commerce Engine No. 555") was also used in Emperor of the North Pole both as No. 5, and also (via 'Hollywood off-camera magic') as No. 27.

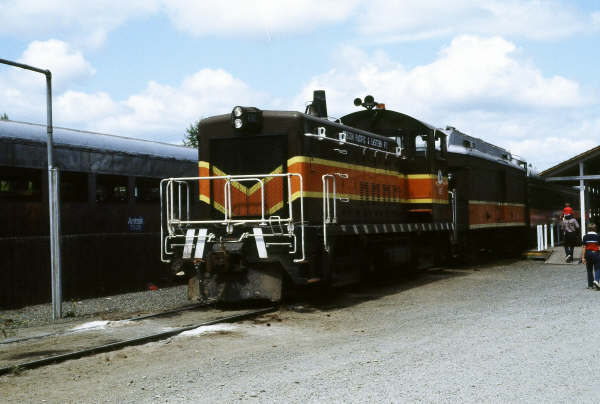
OP&E 602

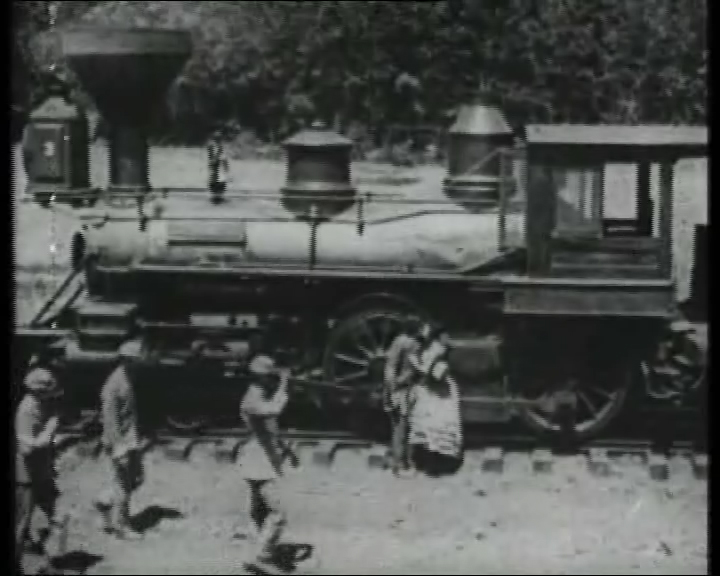
OP&E 4, an 1886-built Cooke 4-4-0 locomotive as it appeared in the Buster Keaton film, The General, portraying the famous Civil War locomotive.
