= Sharps Creek (Oregon) =

- Location of the mouth of Sharps Creek in Oregon
- Etymology: For 19th-century miner James H. "Bohemia" Sharp

Location
- Country: United States
- State: Oregon
- County: Lane

Physical characteristics
- Source: Bohemia Mountain
  - location: Cascade Range, Umpqua National Forest
  - coordinates: 43°34′10″N 122°39′39″W
  - elevation: 5,317 ft (1,621 m)
- Mouth: Row River
  - location: Culp Creek
  - coordinates: 43°41′44″N 122°50′17″W
  - elevation: 958 ft (292 m)

Sharps Creek is a tributary of the Row River in Lane County, in the U.S. state of Oregon. It begins near Bohemia Mountain and the Calapooia Divide of the Cascade Range and flows generally northwest to meet the river. Much of its course lies within the Umpqua National Forest. Sharps Creek enters the Row River at the unincorporated community of Culp Creek, about 12 miles (19 km) southeast of Cottage Grove.

According to Oregon Geographic Names, Sharps Creek was named for James H. "Bohemia" Sharp, a local prospector and road builder. The "Bohemia" in Sharp's nickname stemmed from another miner, James Johnson, who in 1863 found lode gold deposits on the mountain. Earlier prospectors had found placer gold in the creek in 1858. Johnson was nicknamed "Bohemia" because he had grown up in Bohemia in eastern Europe. He and other miners organized the Bohemia Gold and Silver Mining District (later referred to as the Bohemia mining district) in 1867.

The Sharps Creek Recreation Site, overseen by the Bureau of Land Management, is along the creek 18 miles (29 km) from Cottage Grove. Open usually from mid-May through the end of September, it has a day use area, 11 campsites, potable water, toilets, picnic tables and fire rings, and a swimming hole. Recreational activities near the site include fishing, hiking, wildlife viewing, and gold panning.

== Tributaries ==
Named tributaries listed from source to mouth include Bohemia Creek, which enters from the right; Judson Rock Creek, right; Fairview Creek, right; Sailors Gulch, left; Martin Creek, left, and White Creek, right. Also, Walker Creek, left; Buck Creek, left; Lick Creek, right; Staples Creek, right; Pony Creek, right; Table Creek, left; Damewood Creek, left, and Boulder Creek, left.

== See also ==
- List of rivers of Oregon
