= Wildwood, Lane County, Oregon =

Unincorporated community in the state of Oregon, United States

Coordinates: 43°41′44″N 122°49′34″W

Wildwood is an unincorporated community in Lane County, Oregon, United States. It is located between Culp Creek and Disston on the former line of the Oregon, Pacific and Eastern Railway (OP&E), about 16 miles southeast of Cottage Grove.

Wildwood post office began in 1888 and closed out to Disston in 1914. The first sawmill on the upper Row River was built in Wildwood in 1890, powered by Wildwood Falls. The OP&E was built through Wildwood in 1903.
