= Disston, Oregon =

Unincorporated community in Oregon, United States

- Unincorporated community
- Location within Oregon Location within the United States
- Coordinates: 43°41′53″N 122°46′12″W
- Country: United States
- State: Oregon
- County: Lane
- Elevation: 1,152 ft (351 m)
- Time zone: UTC-8 (Pacific (PST))
  - Summer (DST): UTC-7 (PDT)
- ZIP code: 97434
- Area codes: 458 and 541
- GNIS feature ID: 1141052

Disston is an unincorporated community in Lane County, Oregon, United States, southeast of Cottage Grove where Brice Creek and Layng Creek join to form the Row River. It is about a mile west of the Umpqua National Forest. Its post office opened in 1906 and ran until 1974. Cranston Jones—the first postmaster—was also one of the founders of the first sawmill in Disston and the name of the town came from the famous Disston saws.

At one time there were two sawmills in Disston, the Wheeler-Osgood Lumber Company and the I. E. James Lumber Company. Both mills closed down in the 1950s.

Disston was a sawmill and logging town and also a supply point for miners heading into the nearby Bohemia mining district. The terminus of the Oregon, Pacific and Eastern Railway logging railroad was also in Disston. Much of the former rail line has now been converted to the Row River National Recreation Trail, although the rail trail doesn't extend into Disston. A hiking trail managed by the United States Forest Service, the Noonday Wagon Road Trail, follows an 1896 wagon road that started in Disston and was used to haul supplies into the mining district.

== See also ==
- Musick Guard Station, a historic Forest Service structure southeast of Disston
