= Brumbaugh Bridge =

Former covered bridge in Oregon, US

- Formerly listed on the U.S. National Register of Historic Places
- Location within Oregon Location within the United States
- Nearest city: Cottage Grove
- Coordinates: 43°47′20.87″N 123°01′28.88″W
- Built: 1948
- Architectural style: Howe truss
- MPS: Oregon Covered Bridges (TR)
- NRHP reference No.: 79002101

Significant dates
- Listed: November 29, 1979
- Removed from NRHP: after demolition in 1979

The Brumbaugh Bridge was a covered bridge in Lane County in the U.S. state of Oregon. Built in 1948, the structure originally carried Row River Road over Mosby Creek near Cottage Grove. It was added to the National Register of Historic Places in 1979 and was subsequently delisted.

The bridge was demolished in 1979. Some of its timbers were combined with timbers from Meadows Bridge, also demolished in 1979, to construct a covered pedestrian bridge, Centennial Covered Bridge, over the Coast Fork Willamette River in Cottage Grove.

The Howe truss structure, 90 feet (27 m) long, was the second covered bridge at this location. The first Brumbaugh Bridge was a 92-foot (28 m) Howe truss structure built in 1925.

== See also ==
- List of bridges on the National Register of Historic Places in Oregon
- List of Oregon covered bridges
