= Culp Creek, Oregon =

Unincorporated community in Oregon, United States

- Unincorporated community
- Location within Oregon Location within the United States
- Coordinates: 43°42′12″N 122°50′51″W
- Country: United States
- State: Oregon
- County: Lane
- Elevation: 961 ft (293 m)
- Time zone: UTC-8 (Pacific (PST))
  - Summer (DST): UTC-7 (PDT)
- ZIP codes: 97434
- Area code: 541
- GNIS feature ID: 1140531

Culp Creek is an unincorporated community in Lane County, Oregon, United States, southeast of Cottage Grove on the Row River. It lies on Row River Road between Dorena and Disston.

== Geography ==
Culp Creek is located 961 feet (293 m) above sea level in the foothills of the Cascade Range. The community is located where the Row River receives the stream that shares its name with the community. Hawley Butte lies just north of Culp Creek and stands 2,992 feet (912 m) tall.

== History ==
Culp Creek is a tributary stream of the Row River, and was named for settler John Culp just before 1900. A logging camp was established in the area and named Culp Creek Camp, so when a new post office was set up in 1925, it was named Culp Creek after the camp.

The community's economy was long driven by the logging industry, including the Bohemia, Inc. sawmill that ran from 1959 until about 1990, just across the river. Bohemia was headquartered in Culp Creek until it was bought by Willamette Industries in 1991. At one time, there were over 20 mills along the Row River. The Oregon, Pacific and Eastern Railway (OP&E) line was built through Culp Creek in the early 1900s to ship ore, timber, supplies and passengers. Today the former OP&E line has been converted into a rail trail that opened in 1997, the Row River National Recreation Trail, which ends just past Culp Creek. Culp Creek's only store closed shortly after the closure of the mill.

In 1926, Buster Keaton filmed the climax of the silent film The General on the OP&E line near Culp Creek. Keaton spent $40,000 to build a temporary trestle over the Row River. During the scene, the bridge was set on fire and collapsed just as a locomotive passed over it. The remains of the bridge and locomotive were left in the river for 15 years, until they were removed in 1941 for scrap metal.

Culp Creek post office closed in 2009; the community's mail is now addressed to Dorena.

== Education ==
The area is served by the South Lane School District, which includes the Childs Way Charter School located in Culp Creek. Childs Way is a public charter school serving 35 students in grades six through twelve. Culp Creek Elementary School was consolidated with a school in Dorena in 1989 and closed, with the buildings becoming home to the charter school in 1994.
