= Stewart Bridge =

Stewart Bridge may refer to:

- Stewart Bridge (Oak, Nebraska), near Oak, Nebraska, listed on the NRHP in Nebraska
- Stewart Bridge (Walden, Oregon), listed on the NRHP in Oregon
