= Musick Guard Station =

- U.S. National Register of Historic Places
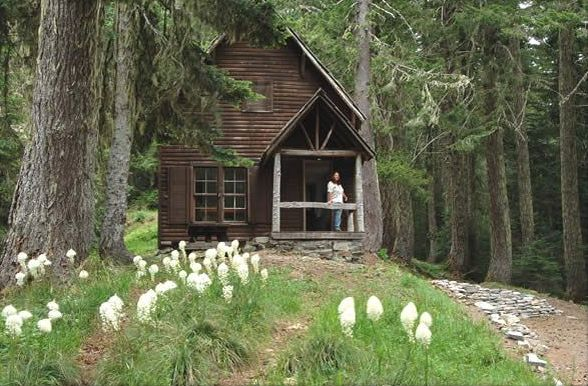
- Location: Umpqua National Forest
- Nearest city: Cottage Grove, Oregon
- Coordinates: 43.58083°N 122.63972°W
- Built: 1934
- Architectural style: Rustic forest cabin
- NRHP reference No.: 91000170
- Added to NRHP: 1991

The Musick Guard Station is a rustic cabin located in the Umpqua National Forest in western Oregon, United States. It was originally built to house fire crews assigned to patrol the surrounding National Forest. In the 1990s, the United States Forest Service began renting Musick Guard Station to recreational visitors. The Musick Guard Station is listed on the National Register of Historic Places.

== History ==
In the 1920s and 1930s, Forest Service employees often traveled many miles from local ranger stations to forest work sites. Since the forest road networks were not well developed, getting to a job site meant a long trek, carrying all the equipment need to perform the field work. This made it impractical for employees to make daily round-trips. To facilitate work at remote sites, the Forest Service built guard stations at strategic locations throughout the forest to house fire patrols and project crews.

After World War II, the Forest Service greatly expanded its road network, allowing employees to get to most National Forest areas within a few hours. As a result, guard stations lost their utility. The Forest Service found new uses for some stations, but most were demolished or abandoned. In the 1990s, historic preservation groups with the support of Forest Service employees began pressing National Forest managers to preserve the remaining structures. To finance the preservation effort the Forest Service started renting its guard stations to the public.

The Musick Guard Station was built by the Civilian Conservation Corps in 1934. It is located in the Umpqua National Forest approximately 38 miles (61 km) east of Cottage Grove, Oregon, in the heart of the old Bohemia mining district. The area is named after James "Bohemia" Johnson, the prospector who discovered gold there in 1863. The guard station was named after the nearby Musick Mine, a large gold mining operation in the late 19th and early 20th centuries.

It was originally used as a home station for fire crews that patrolled the forests around the Bohemia mining area. The cabin was used as a summer barracks for Forest Service fire patrols and trail crews until the 1960s when it was abandoned. In the early 1990s, the Forest Service started renting cabins including Musick Guard Station to the public for recreational purposes. Because of its rustic architecture and the cabin's unique historic value as an early Forest Service guard station, it was listed on the National Register of Historic Places in 1991.

== Structure ==
The Musick Guard Station is located on a narrow forested ridge between Fairview Peak and Grouse Mountain, at about 5,000 feet (1,500 m) elevation. It is surrounded by rugged 6,000-foot (1,800 m) mountains with steep slopes covered with Douglas fir, spruce, and western hemlock. The Musick Guard Station is a rustic two-story cabin. It has a wood-frame structure and a concrete foundation. The exterior is covered with weatherboard and shingles. It is stained dark brown so it blends into the surrounding forest landscape.

On the first floor, the cabin has three rooms. There is a central living room, a kitchen, and a small bedroom. The upstairs is a bunkroom that provides additional sleeping quarters. The cabin has two wooden platform beds and four bunk bed sets; however, there are no mattresses. The cabin is also furnished with table and chairs. In the living room, there is a wood-burning stove for heat. In the kitchen, there is a wood-burning cook stove. The cabin does not have electricity or water.

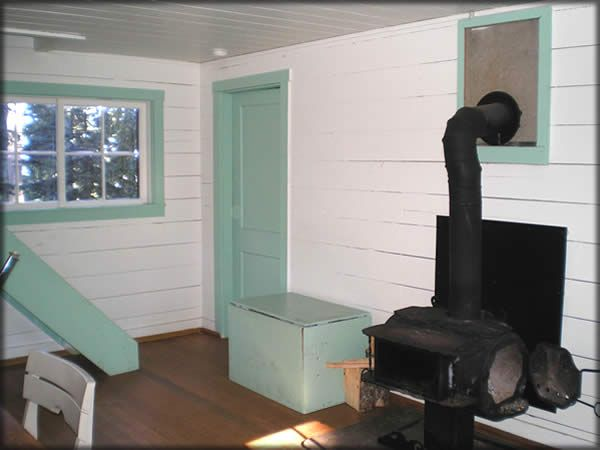
*Living room stove

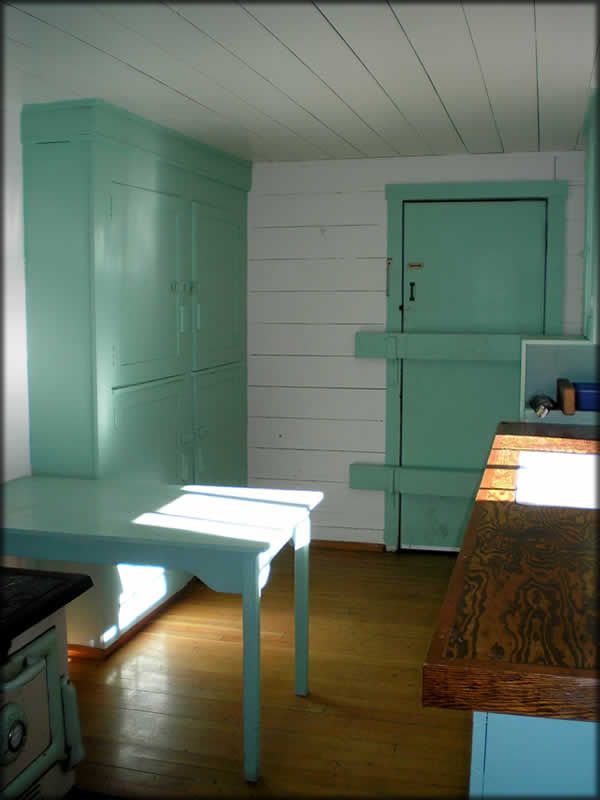
*Kitchen work area

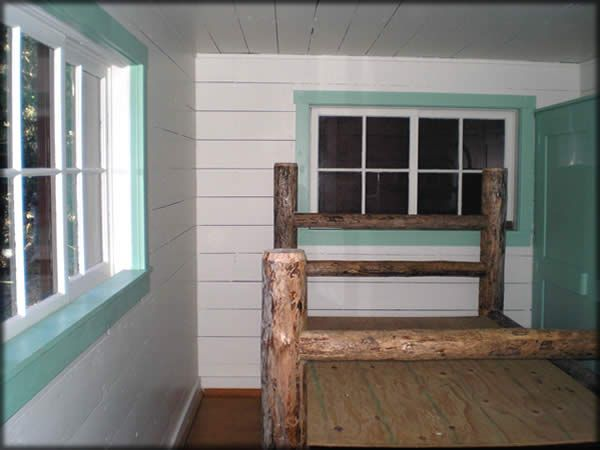
*Downstairs Bedroom

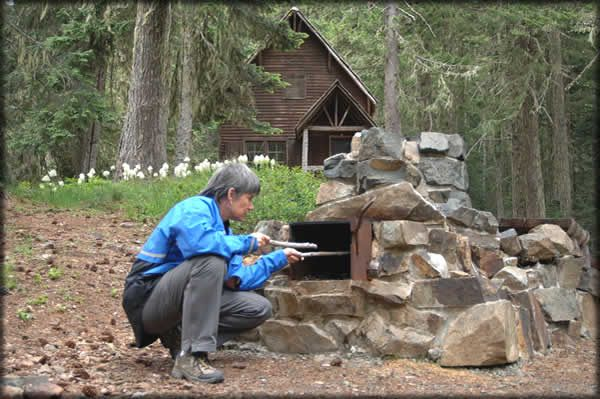
*Outdoor cook grill

There is a vault-type outhouse located near the cabin. A horse barn, a small shed, an outdoor fireplace with a cooking grill, and a picnic table are also located on the guard station grounds. There is room for tent camping at the site as well.

== Recreation ==
In the summer, visitors can hike nearby trails. The Bohemia Mountain Trail is a particularly popular. The trailhead is a little over a mile from the guard station. From there, it is a 3/4 mile hike to the summit of Bohemia Mountain which is highest point on the Cottage Grove Ranger District. However, it is not an easy hike with grades averaging 15-20 percent most of the way. A one-way trip takes about an hour from the trailhead. Hikers must pack their own water since none is available on the trail. From the summit of Bohemia Mountain there is an excellent view of the Cascade Range from Mount Hood to Mount Shasta.

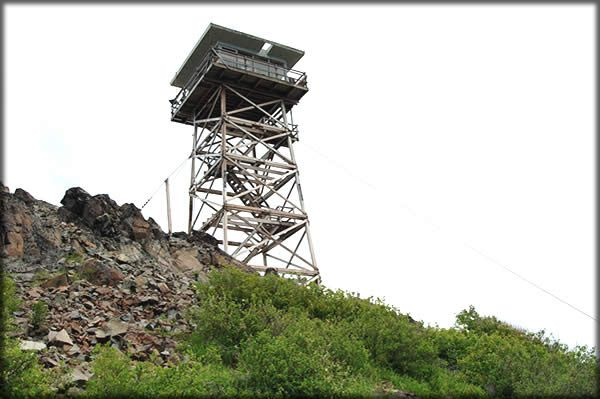
Fairview Peak lookout tower near Musick Guard Station

Another popular hike is to the summit of near-by Fairview Peak. Fairview Peak summit is about two miles (3 km) from the guard station. At the top there is a 53-foot (16 m) fire lookout tower that is staffed during the summer. When a Forest Service lookout is in residence, the tower is open to the public. Visitors can climb the tower and see how fires are spotted and their location plotted using an azimuth. From the lookout tower's deck there is a panoramic view of the surrounding forest and the Cascade Mountains. On a clear day, visitor can see a far north as Mt. Hood and as far south as Mt. Shasta.

In the Bohemia area, it is important to stay on designated hiking trails. Most of the old mines in the area are located on private property and can be very dangerous. It is particularly dangerous to enter abandoned tunnels or shafts.

== Access ==
Musick Guard Station is available for public reservations from mid-June to mid-October at a rate of $50 per night. The Umpqua National Forest keeps 95 percent of the rental fee to maintain the cabin and improve the site. The maximum capacity of the cabin is 10 people. There is no electricity or water at the site. Therefore, visitors must bring plenty of water for drinking, cooking, and washing, as well as a cold chest and non-flammable lanterns or lights. In addition, visitors must bring their own sleeping bags or bedding, cooking utensils, toiletries, towel, and first aid kit.

Musick Guard Station is located 38 miles (61 km) from Cottage Grove. There are a number of alternative routes to the guard station. Contact the Umpqua National Forest headquarters in Roseburg, Oregon or the Cottage Grove Ranger District in Cottage Grove during normal business hours for route information and road conditions.
