= Cottage Grove Lake =

Reservoir in Oregon, United States

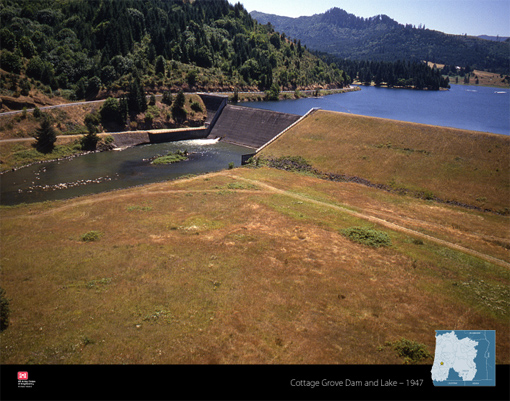
- Cottage Grove Dam and Lake

- Location of Cottage Grove Lake in Oregon Cottage Grove Lake (the United States)
- Location: Lane County, Oregon, United States
- Coordinates: 43°42′55″N 123°03′02″W
- Type: Mesotrophic reservoir
- Primary inflows: Coast Fork Willamette River
- Primary outflows: Coast Fork Willamette River
- Catchment area: 106 square miles (270 km^{2})
- Basin countries: United States
- Managing agency: U.S. Army Corps of Engineers
- Max. length: 3 miles (4.8 km)
- Surface area: 1,025.9 acres (415.2 ha)
- Average depth: 29 feet (8.8 m)
- Max. depth: 73 feet (22 m)
- Water volume: 33,000 acre-feet (41,000,000 m^{3})
- Residence time: 2 months
- Shore length^{1}: 10.6 miles (17.1 km)
- Surface elevation: 794 feet (242 m)
- ^{1} Shore length is not a well-defined measure.

Cottage Grove Lake is a reservoir on the Coast Fork Willamette River in Lane County, Oregon, United States. The lake is about 3 miles (4.8 km) long.

Cottage Grove Dam, which impounds the lake, is 1,750 feet (530 m) long and 95 feet (29 m) high. It was completed in 1942 as one of the 13 dams built by the United States Army Corps of Engineers in the Willamette River basin. It is about 5 miles (8 km) south of Cottage Grove at river mile 29 (kilometer 47).

The dam's main function, in conjunction with the Dorena Dam on the Row River, a Coast Willamette tributary, is flood control. Other functions are to supply water for irrigation and improved river navigation. The lake and its surrounds are used for recreation, including boating, camping, fishing, picnicking, and bird-watching.

== See also ==
- List of lakes in Oregon
