= Wildwood, Oregon =

Wildwood, Oregon may refer to:

- Wildwood, Clackamas County, Oregon
  - Wildwood Recreation Site, near Wildwood in Clackamas County
- Wildwood, Lane County, Oregon
