= Academy for Character Education =

Location
- 195 North 6th Street; Cottage Grove, (Lane County), Oregon 97424; United States; 43.798939°N 123.061683°W

Information
- Type: Public
- Opened: 2007
- School district: South Lane School District
- Director: Starr Sahnow
- Grades: K-12
- Enrollment: 101
- Colors: Red, black, and white
- Mascot: Eagle
- Website: www.aceclassicaled.org

Academy for Character Education (ACE) is a public charter school in Cottage Grove, Oregon, United States.

== Classical education model ==
The school uses the classical education model, which is a similar method to what the Greeks or Romans used. Students go through three stages of education cycles known as the "Grammar, Dialectic and Rhetoric stages". In the first stage, children learn the basics of language, mathematics, and discourse, along with the fundamentals of science. In the second stage, the knowledge from stage 1 is pieced together as students ask "why" and "how". Students begin to understand what they memorized in the Grammar stage. They can begin to form ideas of their own while being taught to properly formulate them with the study of logic. In the final stage, young adults can form their own opinions based on fact and reason. They can analyze sources, interpret them, and have meaningful discussions with each other. They often enjoy friendly but firmly grounded debates.

Students learn Latin. They are taught science, language arts, humanities and a special subject called Character, in which they discuss "character traits", and the moral characters of those in history and apply them to their own lives.

As the year progresses, high schoolers teach a class on a given week. They focus on a certain character trait per month, such as attentiveness.

ACE tailors academia to each student individually. Students can go down or up to less rigorous or more challenging classes if it best helps their learning, and are placed in classes based on skill level rather than age.

ACE offers excellent AP classes that prepare students well for the tests. Students have been shown to understand more intellectual processes, have a better knowledge of science, history, logic and government (both U.S. and foreign nations) than non-ACE students they interact with. For the 2018–2019 school year ace offers/ed 5 AP classes. The teachers according to the students exceed in aiding the students by helping them individually and as a group. Students also receive individual aid in their mathematics once a week via a tutor.

== Academics ==
In 2008–2017, 100% of the school's seniors received a high school diploma. Of 11 seniors, 11 graduated from ACE. For the 2016–2017 school year 80% if high school students received a 3.5 GPA or higher with some exceeding a 4.0., thus receiving a Presidential Award with the sitting president's signature printed on it.

There are 9 classes for 12 grades. ACE is a public/homeschool hybrid, in which there are avg six SCD days a month. Students attend school on Tuesdays and Thursdays, following normal school hours, and get every fourth week off. (three weeks of SCDs, one week of break), as well as normal breaks for things like holidays, and spring, summer, fall, and winter break.

Students are required to complete a good 4.5 weeks' worth of homework in 3 weeks expectantly increasing in the AP classes, but get the privilege of having the 4th week off. They also have four-year education cycles for history and science (e.g., biology, chemistry, physics, and geology). If effort is put into this experience, students should be well on track for college.

== Activities ==
ACE meets only six mandatory times a month, but students can use the SIF (student instructional funds) they receive, if their work is up to par, to do extra-curricular activities during their week studying at home. They attend field trips throughout the year as a whole school. Trips are education and strive to best supplement the current history/science rotation they are studying. Examples are the Oregon Shakespeare Festival, OMSI, civil war reenactments, boat trips and even trips to Washington DC, Greece, or London: In which fundraising, SIF funds and additional out of pocket funds are used by the students to experience.

== History ==
ACE started as a simple homeschooling support group for families by Ranell Curl, and her daughter, Star Sahnow, in Oakridge, Oregon, known as the Home Scholars Academy. In 2007, ACE became an official school, and moved to Cottage Grove.

== Classes ==
- Character- Analyze the moral character of those in present and history or in novels, also assessment of one's own character.
- Science - Learn biology, chemistry, physics, or earth science and astronomy depending on year. Labs are done every month or more often.
- Language-Arts - Learn to read and write (five paragraph essay model) including poetry and spelling and cursive practice and literature discussions in class.
- Humanities - Study ancient, medieval renaissance and US history depending on year, also logic and reasoning. Econ and music and art history are studied too.
- Latin - Latin grammar vocabulary and translation is learned. In 2017, middle school ACE students won the Latin Olympika competition.
