= Chambers Covered Bridge =

Covered bridge in Oregon, US

- Chambers Bridge
- U.S. National Register of Historic Places
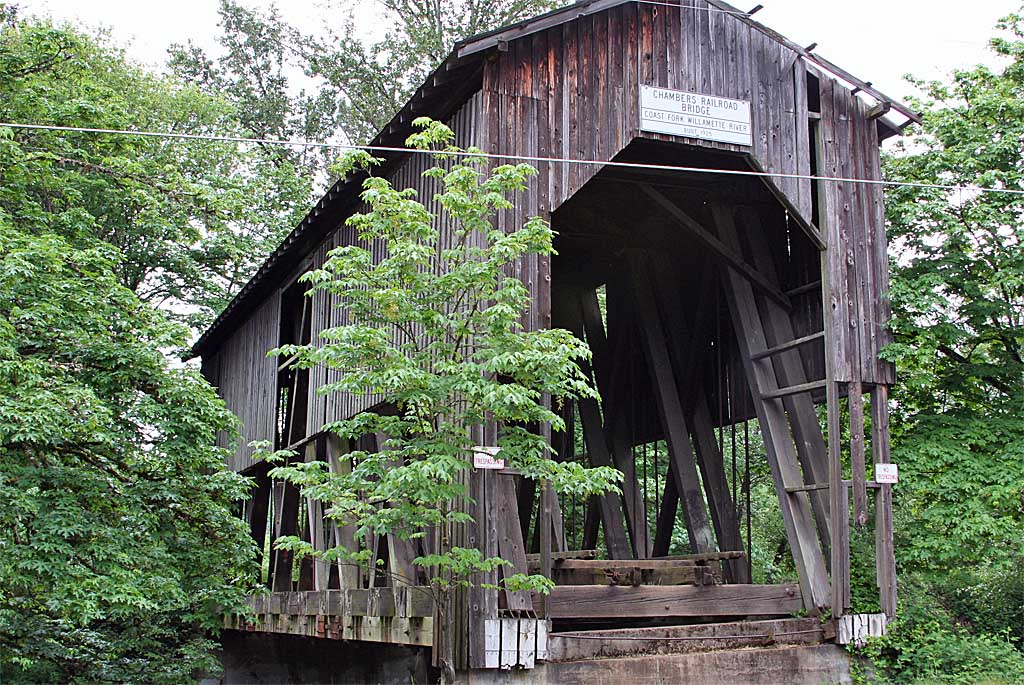

- Location within Oregon Location within the United States
- Location: S. River Rd., Cottage Grove, Oregon
- Coordinates: 43°47′34″N 123°4′7″W
- Area: 0.1 acres (0.040 ha)
- Built: 1925
- Architectural style: Howe Truss
- MPS: Oregon Covered Bridges TR
- NRHP reference No.: 79002081
- Added to NRHP: November 29, 1979

The Chambers Covered Bridge is a covered bridge located in Cottage Grove, Oregon, United States. It is 78 feet (24 m) long and spans the Coast Fork Willamette River. It was built in 1925 to carry rail traffic hauling logs from the Lorane Valley to the J.H. Chambers Mill, a lumber mill which was located on an area between South Highway 99 and the Coast Fork Willamette River. The mill closed in the 1950s after a second fire burned the mill down. The railroad tracks were removed and the bridge was left. The mill property is now being developed as a housing development called Riverwalk. The Chambers Covered Railroad Bridge is the only remaining fully covered railroad bridge west of the Mississippi River.

== Construction ==
It is a Howe truss design.

== Preservation ==
In FY 2008, The National Historic Covered Bridge Preservation Program, administered by the Federal Highway Administration, awarded a grant of $1,315,370 to the City of Cottage Grove for the rehabilitation of the Chambers Covered Bridge, one of seven covered bridges in Oregon that received grants the same period.

== Reconstruction ==
Chambers Covered Bridge was removed in 2010 and replaced with a carefully constructed bridge that is identical to the previous one. The new bridge is now open for pedestrians.

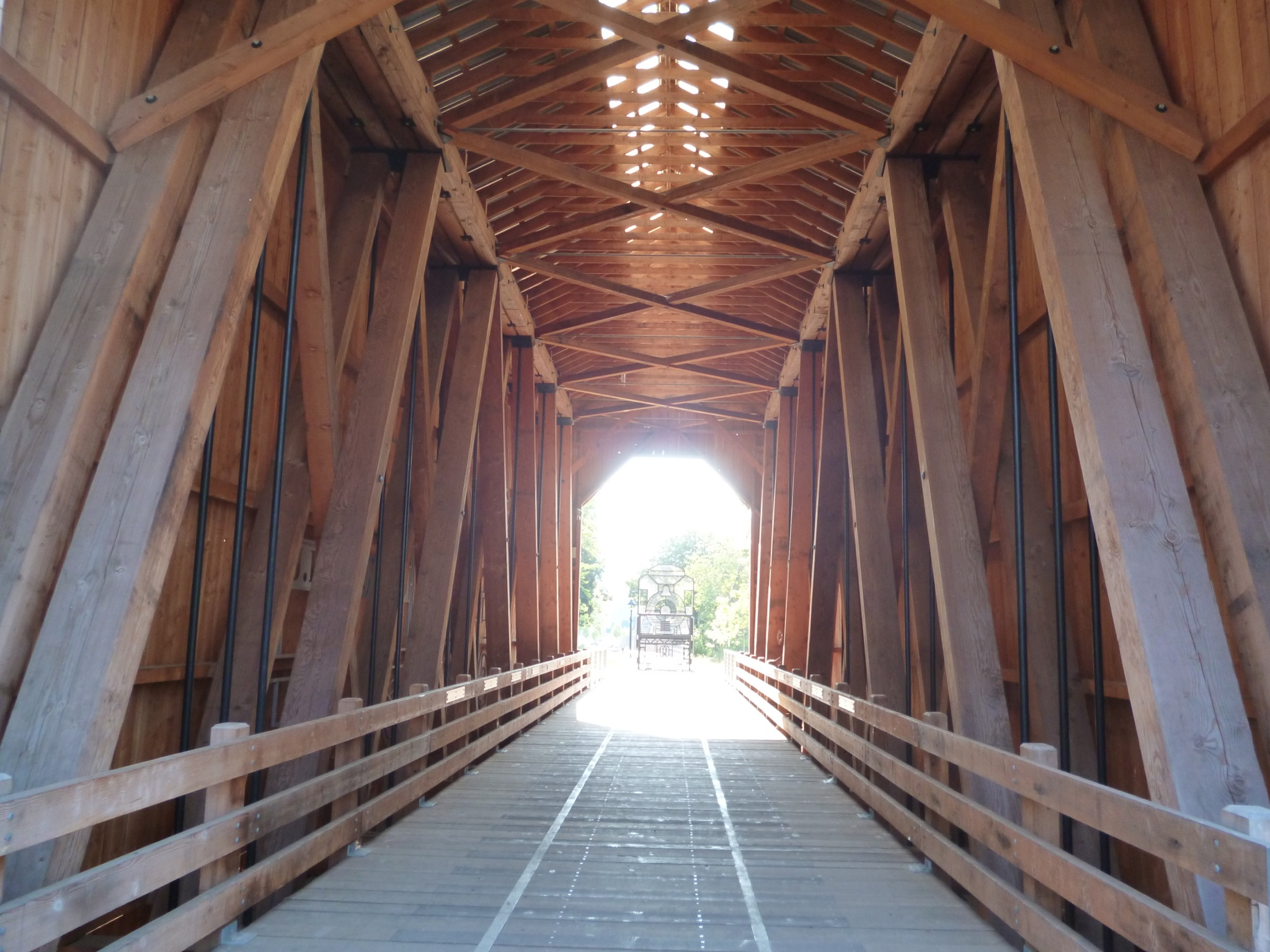
Interior of new Chambers Bridge.

== See also ==
- List of bridges on the National Register of Historic Places in Oregon
- List of Oregon covered bridges
