= Culp Creek =

Stream in Oregon, United States

Coordinates: 43°42′02″N 122°50′57″W

Culp Creek is a stream in Lane County, Oregon, in the United States. It was named for John Culp, a pioneer who settled near this stream. The creek flows northeast into the Row River.

== See also ==
- Culp Creek, Oregon, an unincorporated community
- List of rivers of Oregon
