= Mosby Creek (Oregon) =

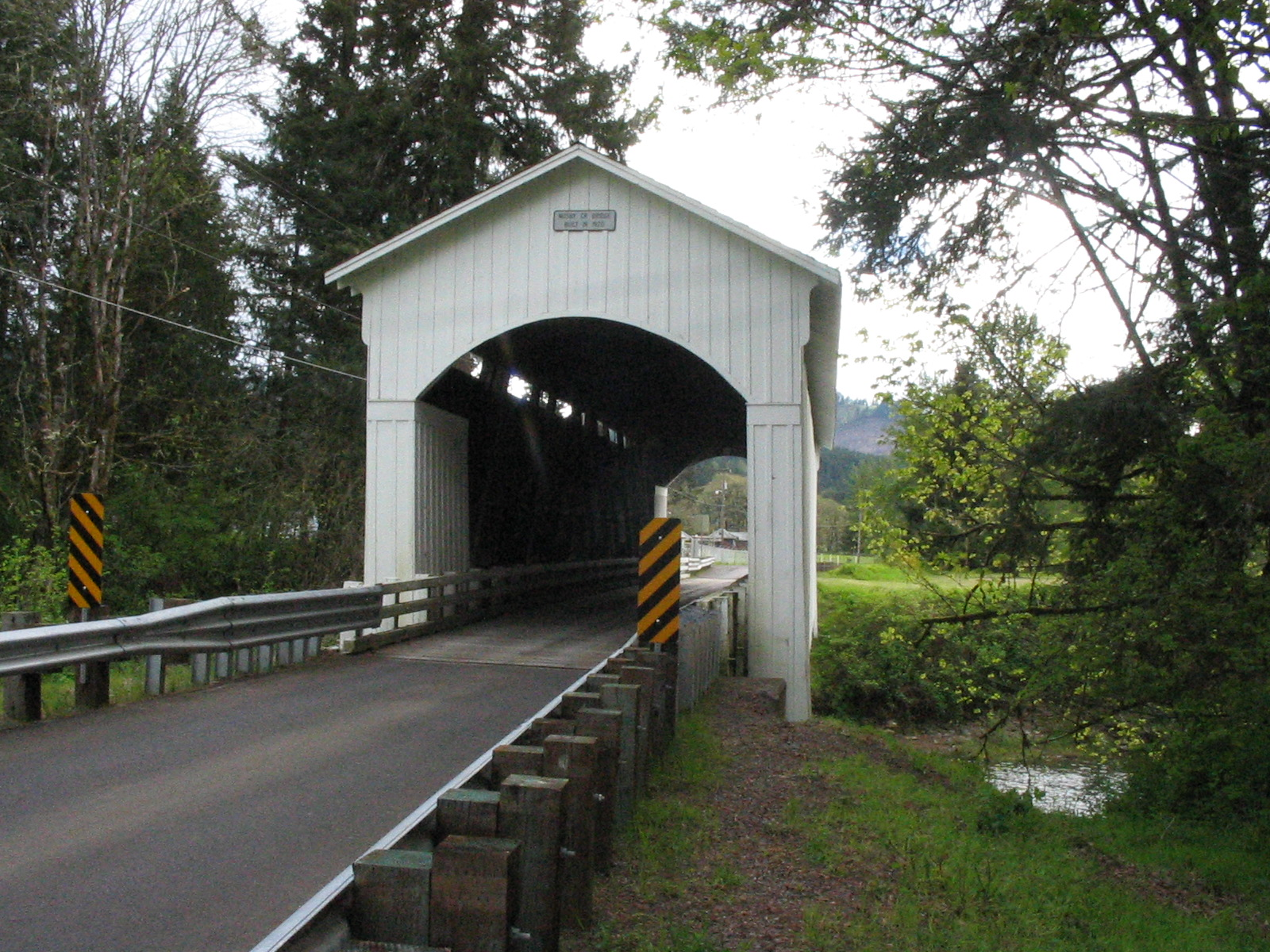
- Mosby Creek Bridge

- Location of the mouth of Mosby Creek in Oregon
- Etymology: David Mosby, pioneer settler

Location
- Country: United States
- State: Oregon
- County: Lane

Physical characteristics
- Source: confluence of West and East forks
  - location: near the Calapooia Divide
  - coordinates: 43°33′12″N 122°51′02″W
  - elevation: 1,508 ft (460 m)
- Mouth: Row River
  - location: near Cottage Grove
  - coordinates: 43°46′47″N 123°00′48″W
  - elevation: 669 ft (204 m)
- Length: 21 mi (34 km)

Mosby Creek is a 21-mile (34 km) tributary of the Row River in Lane County, in the U.S. state of Oregon. It begins at the confluence of the east and west forks of the creek near the Calapooia Divide and the border with Douglas County. From its source it flows generally north-northwest to meet the river slightly east of Cottage Grove and about 4 miles (6 km) from the larger stream's confluence with the Coast Fork Willamette River.

Mosby Creek was named for David Mosby, an early settler. He lived near the mouth of the stream, once known as Brumbaugh Creek.

Mosby Creek Covered Bridge, 90 feet (27 m) long, carries Layng Road over the creek east of Cottage Grove. Built in 1920, it is the oldest covered bridge in Lane County.

Further upstream near Walden, the Stewart Covered Bridge carries Garoutte Road over the creek. Built in 1930 and restored in 1996, this 60-foot (18 m) span is used only for pedestrian and bicycle traffic.

== Tributaries ==
Mosby Creek's east and west forks meet to form the main stem. Named tributaries from source to mouth include Cove, Tom, Miles, Tones, Lilly, Brownie, and Shea creeks. Then come Gray, Norwegian, Dahl, Little Dry, Dry, Bark Shanty, and Stell creeks, followed by Allen, Cedar, Clearing, Cow, Palmer, Rock, and Lewis creeks. Below that are Simpson, Blue, Short, Fall, Kennedy, Smith, Perkins, Kizer, and Champion creeks.

== See also ==
- List of covered bridges in Oregon
- List of rivers of Oregon
