= Dorena Bridge =

Covered bridge in Oregon, US

Coordinates: 43.7376493°N 122.8849115°W

- U.S. National Register of Historic Places
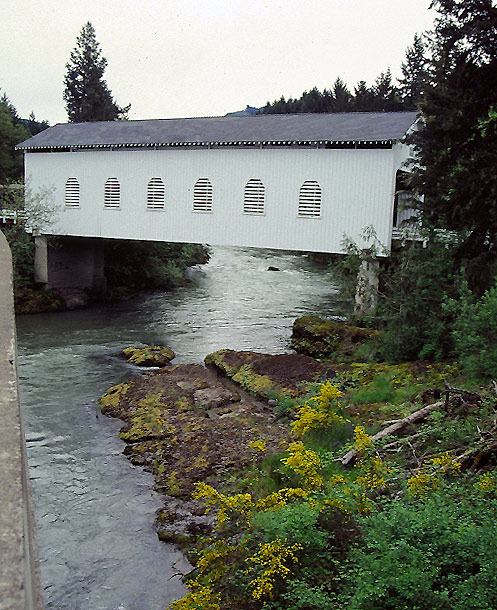
- The bridge in 2002

- Location within Oregon Location within the United States
- Nearest city: Dorena, Oregon
- Area: 0.2 acres (0.081 ha)
- Built: 1949
- Architectural style: Howe truss
- MPS: Oregon Covered Bridges TR
- NRHP reference No.: 79002086
- Added to NRHP: November 29, 1979

The Dorena Bridge is a covered bridge near Dorena in Lane County, Oregon in the United States. It is listed on the National Register of Historic Places. The 105-foot (32 m) structure crosses the Row River near the upper end of Dorena Reservoir.

== See also ==
- List of Oregon covered bridges
- List of bridges on the National Register of Historic Places in Oregon
- National Register of Historic Places listings in Lane County, Oregon
