= Al Kennedy Alternative High School =

Kennedy School of Sustainability

Location
- 79980 Delight Valley School Road; Cottage Grove, Oregon 97424; United States; 43.786244°N 123.059503°W

Information
- Type: Public
- Motto: School of Sustainability
- School district: South Lane School District
- Principal: Halie Ketcher
- Grades: 9-12
- Enrollment: 78
- Mascot: Bear
- Website: kennedy.slane.k12.or.us

Al Kennedy Alternative High School is a public alternative high school operated by the South Lane School District located in Cottage Grove, Oregon, United States. The school serves grades 9–12. It is a small school with a 16:1 student teacher ratio and 84 total students in 2023. Its stated goals are to incorporate experiential and service-learning approaches, including activities related to conservation management, agriculture, forestry and environmental monitoring.

== Sustainability as The Organizing Framework ==
The school curriculum promotes teaching sustainability, ecological responsibility and social responsibility and that the three are linked. The school's students grow and donate produce, work with energy-efficient architecture, restore wetlands, participate in sustainable forestry initiatives, plant community gardens, teach elementary school students, build trails, raise salmon, plant trees, count fish and keep bees.

The school incorporates organic farming practices into its curriculum, with instructional activities including soil testing, planting and cultivating crops, measuring agricultural outcomes, and marketing agricultural products. In 2008, the school partnered with Healing Harvest, a nonprofit organization based in Cottage Grove, Oregon, to design and build organic gardens at elementary schools across the South Lane School District. The partnership also included the development of a master garden on the Kennedy campus.

Students also participate in activities related to sustainable architecture, including instruction on alternative building practices and their historical development. Coursework has included participation in local building projects, such as the construction of a sustainable housing prototype intended for low-income communities.

The school collaborates with local landowners to manage forested and open lands. Student activities include assessing land use in collaboration with landowners, applying trigonometry to facilitate land parcel boundary calculations, rebuilding wildlife habitats, and conducting forest species inventories. Students also work with conservation agencies to draft land management plans and assist landowners with their implementation.

The Energy Management Program at Al Kennedy Alternative High School partners with Lane Community College. In the winter trimester of 2009, the school began offering a College Now course titled Sustainability 101. The course is taught jointly by high school and college instructors and includes instruction related to conservation and energy systems.

== Kennedy Conservation Corps ==
The Kennedy Conservation Corps engages students in the workings of regional and national conservation organizations. Kennedy has engaged in a number of fee-for-service projects with the U.S. Forest Service, Coast Fork Willamette Watershed Council, and private landowners.

== Apiary ==
In March 2010, the school installed three beehives on campus to start a beekeeping program. The Kennedy Apiary promotes vegetable growth in the neighboring community garden, and the beehives allow students to gain hands-on experience studying the ecology of the honeybee.

== Academics ==
In 2008, 44% of the school's seniors received a high school diploma, significantly less than the 74.2% average for the state. Of 48 students, 21 graduated, 21 dropped out, and six were still in high school in 2009. In 2024, 42% of the school's seniors received a high school diploma. Of 52 students, 22 graduated, and 24 dropped out.
