= Currin Bridge =

Covered bridge in Oregon, US

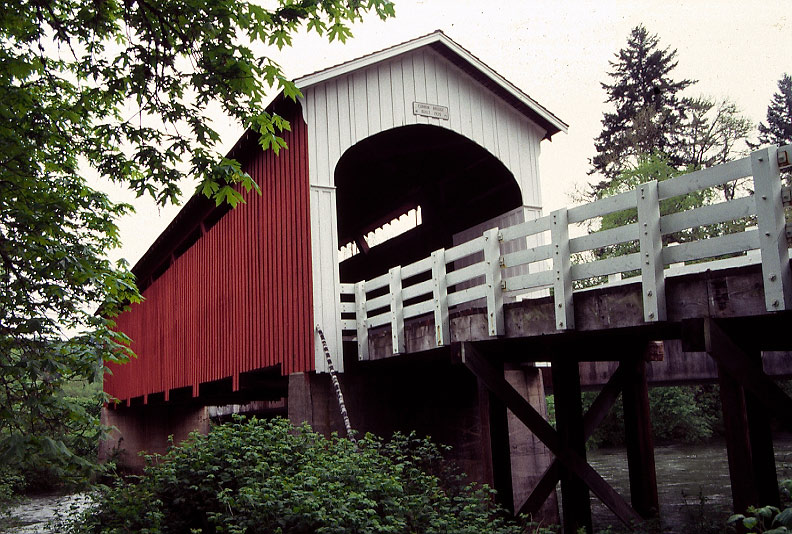
- Coordinates: 43°47′37″N 122°59′43″W
- Carries: Pedestrians
- Crosses: Row River
- Other name: Row River Covered Bridge

Characteristics
- Design: Covered
- Total length: 105 feet (32 m)

History
- Construction end: 1925
- Closed: 1979
- Currin Bridge
- U.S. National Register of Historic Places
- Nearest city: Cottage Grove, Oregon
- Area: 0.2 acres (0.08 ha)
- Built: 1925
- Architectural style: Howe Truss
- MPS: Oregon Covered Bridges TR
- NRHP reference No.: 79002082
- Added to NRHP: November 29, 1979

Location
- Interactive map of Currin Bridge

The Currin Bridge is a Howe truss covered bridge near Cottage Grove, Oregon, United States. It crosses the Row River.

The Currin Bridge was built in 1925 to replace another bridge built in 1883. The lowest bid received by Lane County for construction of the bridge was $6,250, so the county decided to build the bridge on its own for $4,205, saving $2,495 of taxpayers' money. The bridge was named after an early pioneer family.

The Currin Bridge is the only bridge in Oregon that is painted two different colors. The Currin Bridge has white portals and red sides. It is one of seven covered bridges in the immediate area.

In 1979, Lane County completed a new concrete bridge nearby the Currin Bridge and closed the old bridge to traffic. The new bridge is only a few feet away from the Currin Bridge, which is still accessible by pedestrians. In 1987, the bridge had work done fumigating for insects and structural repair, and in 1993–1995, the Oregon Covered Bridge Program of Lane County received a grant of $48,000 to restore the bridge. The bridge was added to the National Register of Historic Places in 1979.

== See also ==
- List of bridges on the National Register of Historic Places in Oregon
