= Stewart Bridge (Walden, Oregon) =

Covered bridge in Oregon, US

- U.S. National Register of Historic Places
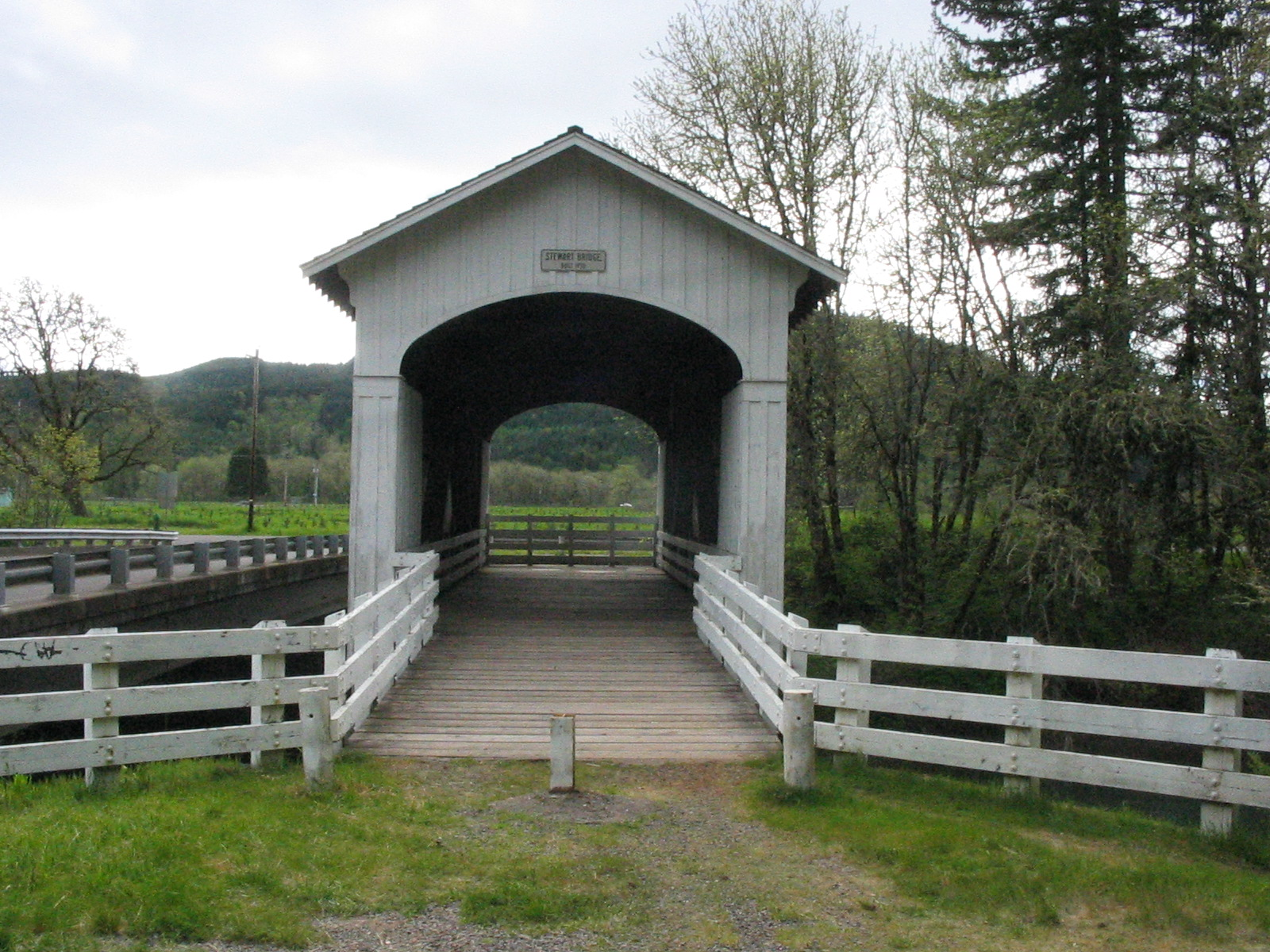

- Location within Oregon Location within the United States
- Nearest city: Walden, Oregon
- Coordinates: 43.76601°N 122.99415°W
- Built: 1930
- Architectural style: Howe Truss
- MPS: Oregon Covered Bridges TR
- NRHP reference No.: 79002102
- Added to NRHP: November 29, 1979

Stewart Bridge is a Howe truss covered bridge built in 1930 near Walden, Oregon, United States, in Lane County. It was listed on the National Register of Historic Places in 1979. It is 60 feet (18 m) long and crosses Mosby Creek, a tributary of the Row River.

== See also ==
- List of bridges on the National Register of Historic Places in Oregon
- List of Oregon covered bridges
