= Centennial Covered Bridge =

Covered bridge in Oregon, US

Coordinates: 43.79744°N 123.06441°W

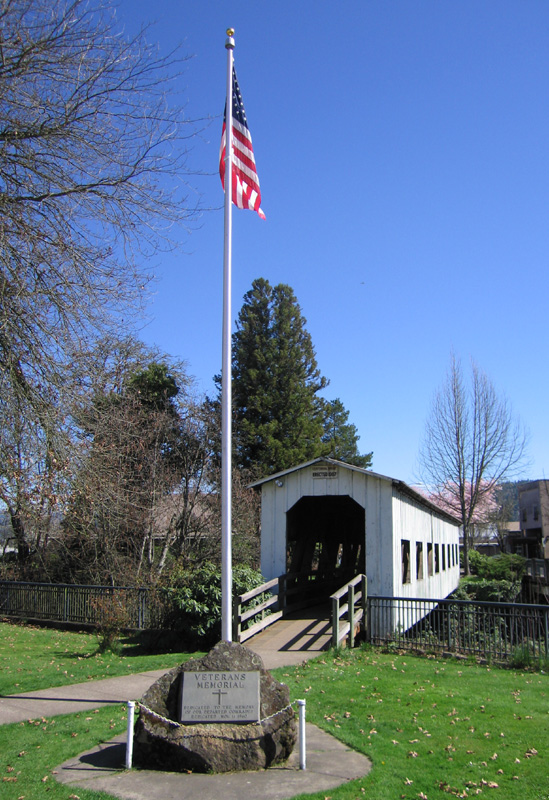
Centennial Covered Bridge and Veterans Memorial

The Centennial Covered Bridge is a covered bridge in Cottage Grove in the U.S. state of Oregon. The Howe truss structure is 84 feet (26 m) long, 10 feet (3.0 m) wide and 14 feet (4.3 m) high. It spans the Coast Fork Willamette River alongside Main Street, carrying only bicycle and pedestrian traffic. It was built in 1987, the hundredth year since the founding of the city. Constructed mostly by volunteers, it was made from timbers salvaged from the Meadows and Brumbaugh bridges, which were dismantled in 1979.

== See also ==
- List of covered bridges in Oregon
- National Register of Historic Places listings in Lane County, Oregon
