= Dorena, Oregon =

Unincorporated community in Oregon, United States

- Unincorporated community
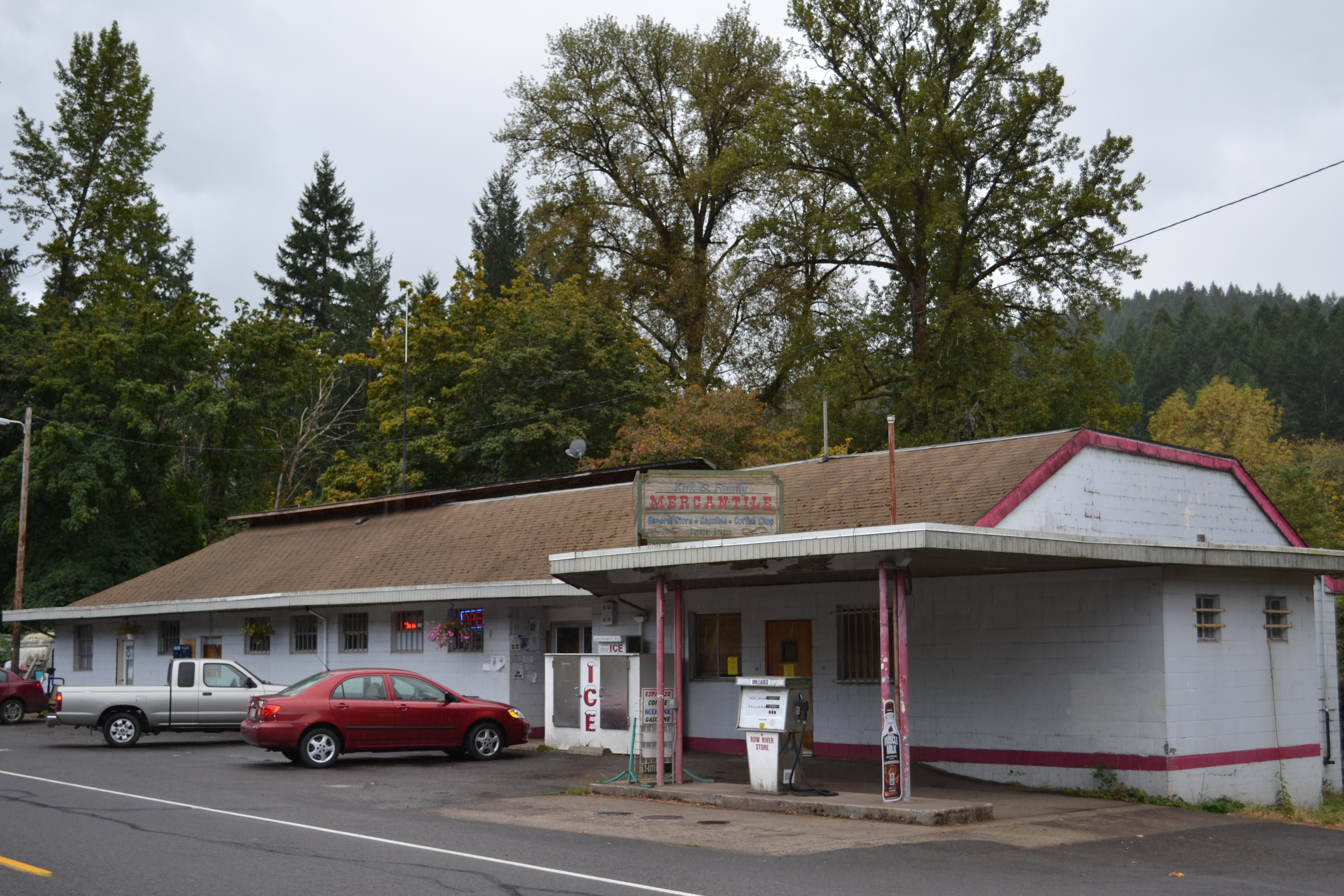
- Dorena Mercantile

- Location within Oregon Location within the United States
- Coordinates: 43°43′11″N 122°51′43″W
- Country: United States
- State: Oregon
- County: Lane
- Elevation: 922 ft (281 m)
- Time zone: UTC-8 (Pacific (PST))
  - Summer (DST): UTC-7 (PDT)
- ZIP code: 97434
- Area codes: 458 and 541
- GNIS feature ID: 1141192

Dorena is an unincorporated community in Lane County, Oregon, United States. It is located southeast of Cottage Grove on the Row River, a tributary of the Coast Fork Willamette River.

== History ==
The first settlers arrived in the Dorena area in the 1850s and depended on agriculture to survive, but later logging and gold mining became the mainstays of the local economy. Dorena was named by combining the first names of Dora Burnette and Lorena Martin. Dorena school was built in 1896, and Dorena post office was established in 1899. In 1946, the town was abandoned when the Corps of Engineers began construction of Dorena Dam on the Row River for flood control. The Corps relocated approximately one hundred homes from the town's former site at 43°46′32″N 122°55′38″W. The dam was completed in 1949 and created Dorena Reservoir, which flooded the townsite. The community was moved five miles upriver.

== Climate ==
This region experiences warm (but not hot) and dry summers, with no average monthly temperatures above 71.6 °F (22.0 °C). According to the Köppen Climate Classification system, Dorena has a warm-summer Mediterranean climate, abbreviated "Csb" on climate maps.

== Transportation ==
The Row River Trail, a rails to trails conversion of a former Oregon, Pacific and Eastern Railway line, passes through Dorena.
