= Emperor of the North Pole =

1973 film by Robert Aldrich

- Original film poster
- Directed by: Robert Aldrich
- Written by: Christopher Knopf
- Produced by: Kenneth Hyman; Stan Hough
- Starring: Lee Marvin; Ernest Borgnine; Keith Carradine; Charles Tyner; Malcolm Atterbury; Harry Caesar; Simon Oakland
- Cinematography: Joseph F. Biroc
- Edited by: Michael Luciano
- Music by: Frank De Vol
- Production company: Inter-Hemisphere
- Distributed by: 20th Century Fox
- Release date: May 24, 1973
- Running time: 118 minutes
- Country: United States
- Language: English
- Budget: $3,705,000
- Box office: $2 million (US/ Canada rentals); 251,021 admissions (France)

Emperor of the North Pole is a 1973 American action adventure film directed by Robert Aldrich, starring Lee Marvin, Ernest Borgnine, Keith Carradine, and Charles Tyner. It was later re-released on home media (and is more widely known) under the shorter title Emperor of the North, ostensibly chosen by studio executives to avoid being mistaken for a heartwarming holiday story. This original title is an homage to the historic joke among Great Depression-era hobos that the world's best hobo was "Emperor of the North Pole", a way of poking fun at their own desperate situation, implying that somebody ruling over the North Pole would reign over nothing but a vast, barren, cold, empty, and stark wasteland. The film depicts the story of two hobos' struggle (esp. vs. "The Establishment") during the Great Depression in 1930s Oregon.

Carradine's character, Cigaret, uses the moniker that Jack London used during his hobo escapades, and like London, is portrayed as a young traveling companion to the older Livingston's A-No.-1 (played by Marvin), but that is where (some assert) the similarity between Carradine's character and Jack London ends, as Cigaret is portrayed in the film as immature, loud-mouthed, and not bright, opposite A-No.-1's gracious and graceful seasoned veteran.

== Plot ==
Shack (Ernest Borgnine) is a conductor on the Oregon, Pacific and Eastern Railroad, during the Great Depression. He zealously guards his freight train, the No. 19, against those trying to ride for free. Two hobos, A-No.-1 and Cigaret, hop the train but are seen by Shack, who locks them both inside the car. A-No.-1, the more experienced hobo, sets fire to the train to burn his way out, successfully completes his hitched ride, and escapes to the hobo jungle. However, the younger and less-experienced Cigaret is caught by railyard laborers who spread a rumor that A-No.-1 died in the fire and that Cigaret is the one who finally bested Shack. Indignant, A-No.-1 declares his intention to ride Shack's train all the way to Portland, and the other hobos agree that the first to accomplish this will have earned the title "Emperor of the North Pole" -- that is, the world's best hobo. Railroad workers place bets whether A-No.-1 can do it, spreading the news nationwide by telephone and telegraph, Shack being widely known and disliked.

The next morning, A-No.-1 manages to board Shack's train and hides inside a hollow metal pipe on a flatcar, only to discover that Cigaret is hiding in the adjacent pipe. Alerted to their presence by Cigaret's carelessness, Shack stops the train to search for them, which forces them to deboard, then spots them when they get back on and fights them until they fall off. Not so easily defeated, A-No.-1 and Cigaret slow the train down so they can reboard and ride to the Salem railyard. Increasingly annoyed by Cigaret's antics, A-No.-1 tells Cigaret to listen and learn from him in order to become a successful hobo. The two get back on the train for a final, bloody confrontation with Shack. In the fight, A-No.-1 is injured and Cigaret refuses to help. A-No.-1 releases the pressure in the brake lines, causing the train to stop quickly. In the aftermath, he tells Cigaret that he lacks the strength and courage to go the distance. Cigaret still insists he will become an all-time great hobo.

After this tirade, Cigaret reboards the train, but immediately retreats in fear from the hammer-wielding and very angry Shack. Just as Shack is about to deliver a fatal blow, A-No.-1 appears and begins battling Shack. A desperate struggle involving heavy chains, planks of wood, and a fire axe ensues (Cigaret watches from a safe distance, atop the caboose). A-No.-1 ultimately has the bloodied Shack at his mercy, but instead of killing him, throws him off the train. In defiance, Shack yells that A-No.-1 has not seen the last of him. A-No.-1 then tosses Cigaret off into a river, for bragging about how "they" defeated Shack, telling the kid he could have become a good bum but he's got no class. "You had the juice, kid, but not the heart", he yells, as the train rolls away to Portland, beyond the distant horizon.

== Cast ==
- Lee Marvin as "A-No.-1"
- Ernest Borgnine as Shack
- Keith Carradine as "Cigaret"
- Charles Tyner as "Cracker"
- Matt Clark as Yardlet
- Liam Dunn as "Smile"
- Simon Oakland as Policeman
- Malcolm Atterbury as "Hogger"
- Elisha Cook, Jr. as "Gray Cat"
- Harry Caesar as Coaly
- Vic Tayback as Yardman
- Hal Baylor as Yardman's Helper
- Jack Collins as Yard Dispatcher
- Joe Di Reda as "Ringer"
- Diane Dye as Girl In Water
- Robert Foulk as Conductor
- James Goodwin as Fakir
- Raymond Guth as Preacher
- Sid Haig as "Grease Tail"
- Karl Lukas as "Pokey Stiff"
- Edward McNally as Yard Clerk
- John Steadman as "Stew Bum"
- Dave Willock as "Groundhog"

== Production ==
The film was announced in January 1972.

Borgnine's fee was $150,000.

Was the fifth film (of six total) that Marvin and Borgnine appeared in together.

=== Filming location ===
The film was shot in and around the city of Cottage Grove, Oregon (also the location used by Buster Keaton for his 1927 railroad feature The General), along the Oregon, Pacific and Eastern Railway (OP&E)'s active right-of-way. Willis Kyle, president of the OP&E in 1972, allowed the film company unlimited access to make the film, after an agreement with Oregon Governor Tom McCall and 20th Century Fox. Oregon, Pacific and Eastern's rolling stock, including two steam locomotives (one being No. 19, a type 2-8-2 Baldwin Locomotive Works logging/mining Light Mikado, the other, No. 5, an ALCO 2-8-0 Consolidation), appear in the film. Also featured in the film is the Dorena Reservoir, located about 10 miles east of Cottage Grove, OP&E's railyard in downtown Cottage Grove, and the former Portland, Astoria, & Pacific Railroad's 1913-built timber trestle bridge over Mendenhall Creek near Buxton, Oregon, now part of the Banks–Vernonia State Trail.

Filming wrapped on October 5, 1972.

== Reception ==
=== Box office ===
The film was a box office failure. Aldrich later confessed he misjudged the film's appeal:

I thought the symbols were so clear. It never occurred to me that the audience would miss the relationship – that Borgnine was the Establishment, that Marvin was the anti-Establishment individualistic character, and that Keith Carradine was the opportunistic youth who would sell out for whatever was most convenient. I never thought that people wouldn't root for the Marvin character. I thought everyone would say, "I understand what Marvin is. He's trying not to be regimented and suppressed, and denied his rights, and I'm for him. " And nobody was. It just didn't happen. Nobody cared.

=== Critical response ===
Rotten Tomatoes gave the film a score of 67% based on reviews from 9 critics.

Roger Ebert gave the film 2.5 stars out of 4 and wrote, "The movie's energies are vast but never focused; what we’re finally left with is too much undirected violence and some superb direction in an uncertain cause." In 1983 on an episode of At the Movies, Ebert praised this film's train stunts as being similar or "Something he had seen before" while reviewing Octopussy to disagree with Gene Siskel.

Vincent Canby of The New York Times praised the film as "a fine, elaborately staged action melodrama", with "splendid performances" and "almost perfect action-movie characters, people who can't bore us with their earlier histories because they don't have any. They exist solely within the time and the action of the film itself. When it stops, they vanish, but we have had a sensational ride."

Variety found the storyline "limited in scope and insufficient to sustain a full-length feature ... While there is a wealth of violence under Robert Aldrich's forceful direction, the motivating idea is bogged down frequently with time out while Marvin expounds the philosophy and finer points of hobodom to a brash young kid (Keith Carradine) who wants terribly to be accepted."

Gene Siskel of the Chicago Tribune gave the film 1.5 stars out of 4 and called it "a dismal adventure yarn" with "nothing in the script to make us care about either man."

Kevin Thomas of the Los Angeles Times praised the film as "a robust, rollicking adventure yarn" with "one of the finest original screenplays to come out of Hollywood this year."

Gary Arnold of The Washington Post knocked the "gratuitous, cartoon screenplay" and went on to state, "The whole point of the movie is the climax. Without that spectacular, sickening interlude of violence, the project would be completely negligible. The film's success depends on finding more people who are excited than repelled at the prospect of watching Lee Marvin hit Ernest Borgnine with an axe."

Quentin Tarantino later wrote "theoretically Aldrich should have been perfect for Emperor of the North. But instead of the muscular rusty claw hammer type direction you’d expect from the big man, Aldrich gives into corny thirties theatrics. The film seems more like a Damon Runyonesque musical about hobos than the crowbar vs. chain donnybrook that MGM sold it to audiences as."

== Soundtrack ==
On June 16, 2008, Intrada Records released the only commercial CD version of composer Frank De Vol's soundtrack to the public, 35 years after the film's release. The CD, limited to 1,200 copies, immediately sold out. Featuring several unused score cues, it was learned that Bill Medley of the Righteous Brothers had originally recorded the vocals for the film's score, but was replaced at the last minute for unknown reasons by Marty Robbins.

The theme ballad, "A Man and a Train", written by Frank De Vol with lyrics by Hal David and sung by Marty Robbins, appears on his album All-Time Greatest Hits (Catalog# 77425), and the CD The Best of Marty Robbins released by Curb Records in January 2006, both featuring a second verse not used in the film.

== Home media ==
The film was released in North America on DVD by 20th Century Fox Home Entertainment on June 5, 2006, under the title Emperor of the North. The Region 2 version was available under general release in the UK from September 3, 2007, under the same title. It was also released on Blu-ray by Twilight Time on September 8, 2015.

== See also ==
- List of American films of 1973

=== Other films ===
- Stand by Me a Rob Reiner film that also features the Oregon, Pacific and Eastern Railway right-of-way.
