= Mosby Creek Bridge =

Covered bridge in Oregon, US

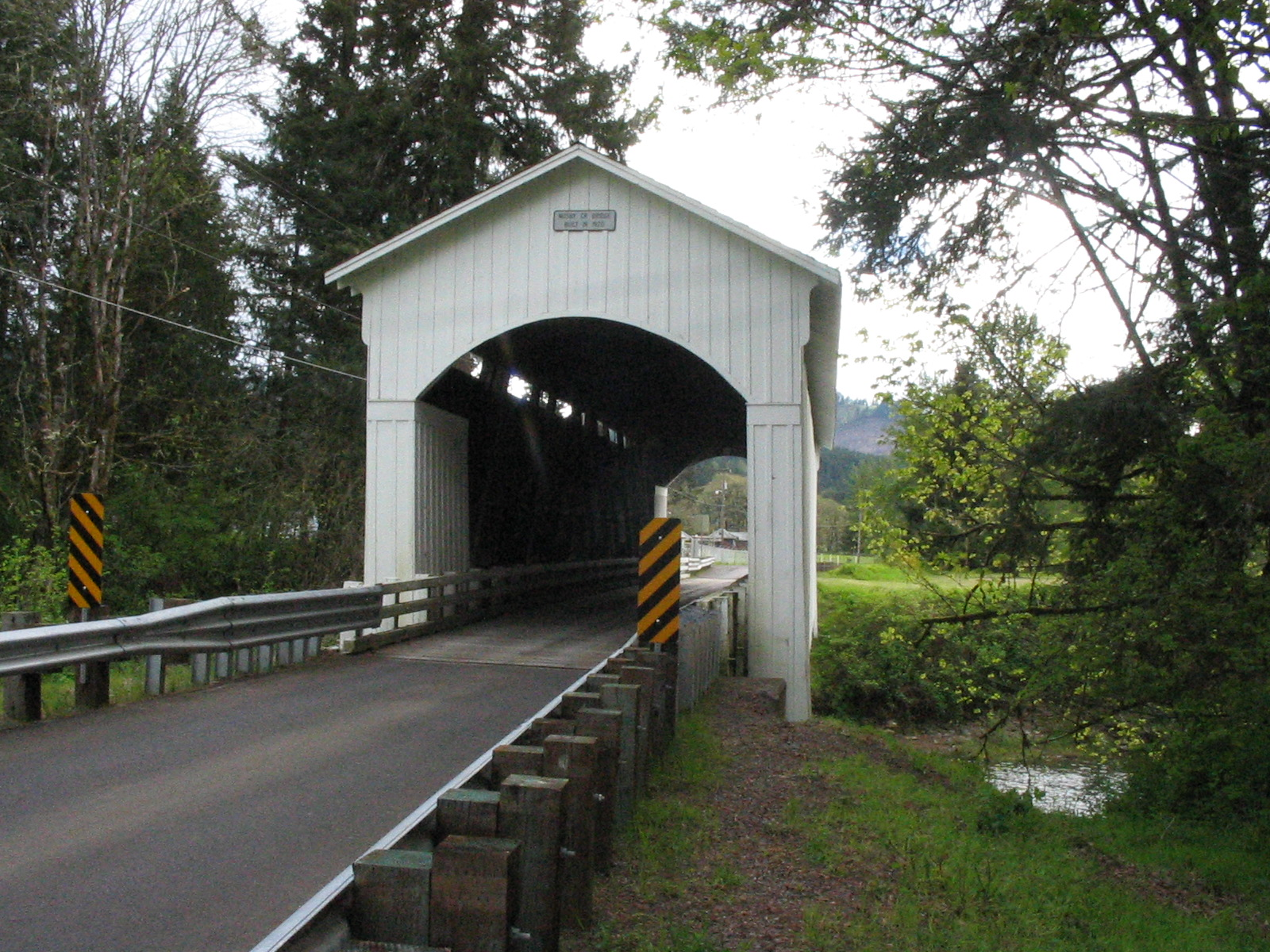
- Coordinates: 43°46′42″N 123°00′17″W
- Carries: Layng Road
- Crosses: Mosby Creek

Characteristics
- Design: Covered, Howe truss
- Total length: 90 feet (27 m)
- Width: 13.5 feet (4.1 m)
- Clearance above: 12.3 feet (3.7 m)

History
- Constructed by: Walter and Miller Sorensen
- Construction end: 1920
- Closed: 1979
- Mosby Creek Bridge
- U.S. National Register of Historic Places
- Location within Oregon Location within the United States
- Nearest city: Cottage Grove, Oregon
- Coordinates: 43°46′42″N 123°0′17″W
- Area: 0.1 acres (0.04 ha)
- Built: 1920
- Architectural style: Howe Truss
- MPS: Oregon Covered Bridges TR
- NRHP reference No.: 79002083
- Added to NRHP: November 29, 1979

Location
- Interactive map of Mosby Creek Bridge

The Mosby Creek Bridge, also called the Layng Bridge, is a historic Howe truss covered bridge located near Cottage Grove, Oregon, United States. The bridge crosses Mosby Creek and was constructed in 1920, making it the oldest covered bridge in Lane County.

The Mosby Creek Bridge was built in 1920 for a cost of $4125 (US$66,295 in 2025) by Walter and Miller Sorensen. The bridge was named after the pioneer David Mosby. He settled east of present-day Cottage Grove near the current site of the bridge on a 1,600 acres (650 ha) land claim.

Unique design elements of the Mosby Creek Bridge include semi-circular portal arches (the entrances to the bridge), ribbon openings at the roofline, and board-and-batten siding, as well as modifications to the basic Howe truss design. In 1990, the bridge underwent a major restoration. In 2002, the corrugated metal roof that capped the bridge's gable roof was replaced with synthetic material, as well as other repairs.

In 1979, the bridge was added to the National Register of Historic Places. The Mosby Creek Bridge remains open to traffic, the only bridge in the area that does so. The Mosby Creek Bridge receives regular maintenance from the county.

== See also ==
- List of bridges on the National Register of Historic Places in Oregon
- List of Oregon covered bridges
