= Bohemia mining district =

The Bohemia mining district is an area of about 9 square miles (23 km^{2}) in the Cascade Range of the U.S. state of Oregon. Near Bohemia Mountain in Lane County, about 25 miles (40 km) southeast of Cottage Grove, the district was the most productive of the mining areas in the Western Cascades. Beginning in the 1860s, mines in the district extracted mainly gold and silver but also copper, zinc, and lead, then valued at a total of about $1 million.

In 1858, W. W. Oglesby and Frank Bass, miners from California, found placer gold on Sharps Creek, a tributary of the Row River flowing out of the mountains. In 1863, James "Bohemia" Johnson, originally from Bohemia in central Europe, found lode gold at higher elevations nearby. He and other miners formed the Bohemia Gold and Silver Mining District in 1867. Eventually, the district included several mines, the most productive of which were called Champion, Helena, Musick, and Noonday.

Gold, silver, and other valuable metals are found in a strip 25 to 30 miles (40 to 48 km) wide where the Western Cascades, old and deeply eroded, run west of and parallel to the younger volcanic peaks of the high Cascades. The strip includes five major mining districts: the Bohemia and Fall Creek mining districts in Lane County; the North Santiam mining district in Clackamas and Marion counties; the Quartzville mining district in Linn County, and the Blue River mining district in Linn and Lane counties.

The Bohemia mining district had its own post office for about 30 years. It was established in 1893 and shut down in 1922. The first postmaster was John B. McGee. The surrounding community, Bohemia City, included houses, saloons, and a hotel, all depending on provisions from Cottage Grove.

== See also ==
- Musick Guard Station
