= Bohemia Mountain =

Mountain in Oregon, United States

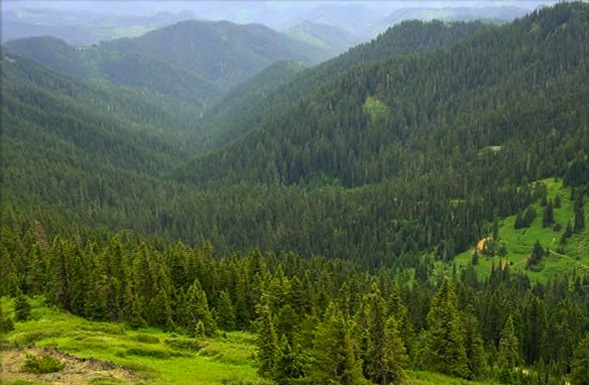
- View from Fairview Peak Lookout, close to the mountain

Highest point
- Elevation: 5,994 ft (1,827 m) NAVD 88
- Prominence: 2,230 ft (680 m)
- Coordinates: 43°34′30″N 122°39′23″W

Geography
- Location within Oregon
- Location: Lane County, Oregon, U.S.
- Topo map: USGS Fairview Peak

Climbing
- First ascent: Fairview Peak

Bohemia Mountain is a mountain in the Cascade Range of the U.S. state of Oregon, within the Umpqua National Forest. Its elevation is 5,994 feet (1,827 m). A trail traverses the mountain and leads to the summit. There is a location east of the trail's end where on a clear day one can see Mount Shasta, Mount Hood, and other peaks of the Cascades. Camping is available in the area. An abundance of wildflowers and plants bloom on the mountain from late June to mid-August, which attracts butterflies to the area.

== Ghost town ==
Bohemia City is a ghost town that lies off the trailhead. A few buildings and some mining equipment remain from the original settlement, which consisted of saloons, hotels, and some residences. The area surrounding the mountain was once known as the Bohemia mining district, named after the Czech immigrant James "Bohemia" Johnson, who discovered gold in the area in 1863. A gold mine and the settlement were established in 1866.

== Climate ==
Bohemia Mountain's climate is influenced by its location in the Pacific Northwest and the Cascade Range, as well as its elevation. The mountain has cool winter temperatures (above the −3 °C (27 °F) persistent snow line isotherm but still freezing), and summers with warm afternoon highs and cool lows (near 40 °F (4 °C)). Because of these summer temperatures, as well as the seasonal lag typical of the Pacific Northwest coastal regions, spring occurs as late as the latter part of June, and temperatures warm enough for plant growth to continue into September.

With summer daily average temperatures above 10 °C (50 °F) for only three months out of the year, winters that are colder than 0 °C (32 °F), and the pronounced summer dry season (well below the Köppen summer dry season threshold of 30 mm or less), Bohemia Mountains's climate is either the dry-summer variant of the subarctic climate (Köppen climate classification Dsc), or a cold-summer mediterranean climate (Köppen climate classification Csc), both being rare climates.

Climate data for Bohemia Mountain, Oregon
Month	Jan	Feb	Mar	Apr	May	Jun	Jul	Aug	Sep	Oct	Nov	Dec	Year
Mean daily maximum °F (°C)	36.3 (2.4)	38.8 (3.8)	41.0 (5.0)	46.4 (8.0)	54.3 (12.4)	61.3 (16.3)	70.0 (21.1)	70.0 (21.1)	65.1 (18.4)	55.0 (12.8)	41.2 (5.1)	35.6 (2.0)	51.3 (10.7)
Daily mean °F (°C)	28.95 (−1.69)	30.8 (−0.7)	31.7 (−0.2)	36.1 (2.3)	42.6 (5.9)	48.3 (9.1)	55.4 (13.0)	55.3 (12.9)	51.0 (10.6)	43.5 (6.4)	34.0 (1.1)	29.1 (−1.6)	40.56 (4.76)
Mean daily minimum °F (°C)	21.6 (−5.8)	22.8 (−5.1)	22.5 (−5.3)	25.9 (−3.4)	30.9 (−0.6)	35.4 (1.9)	40.8 (4.9)	40.5 (4.7)	36.9 (2.7)	32.0 (0.0)	26.8 (−2.9)	22.6 (−5.2)	29.9 (−1.2)
Average precipitation inches (mm)	4.96 (126)	4.33 (110)	3.82 (97)	2.32 (59)	1.85 (47)	1.06 (27)	0.47 (12)	0.59 (15)	1.02 (26)	2.48 (63)	5.94 (151)	6.26 (159)	35.1 (890)
Average precipitation days	14	13	14	11	9	7	3	3	5	8	15	15	117
Mean monthly sunshine hours	104	128	176	227	272	278	319	278	232	172	120	90	2,396
