= Cottage Grove, Oregon =

- City
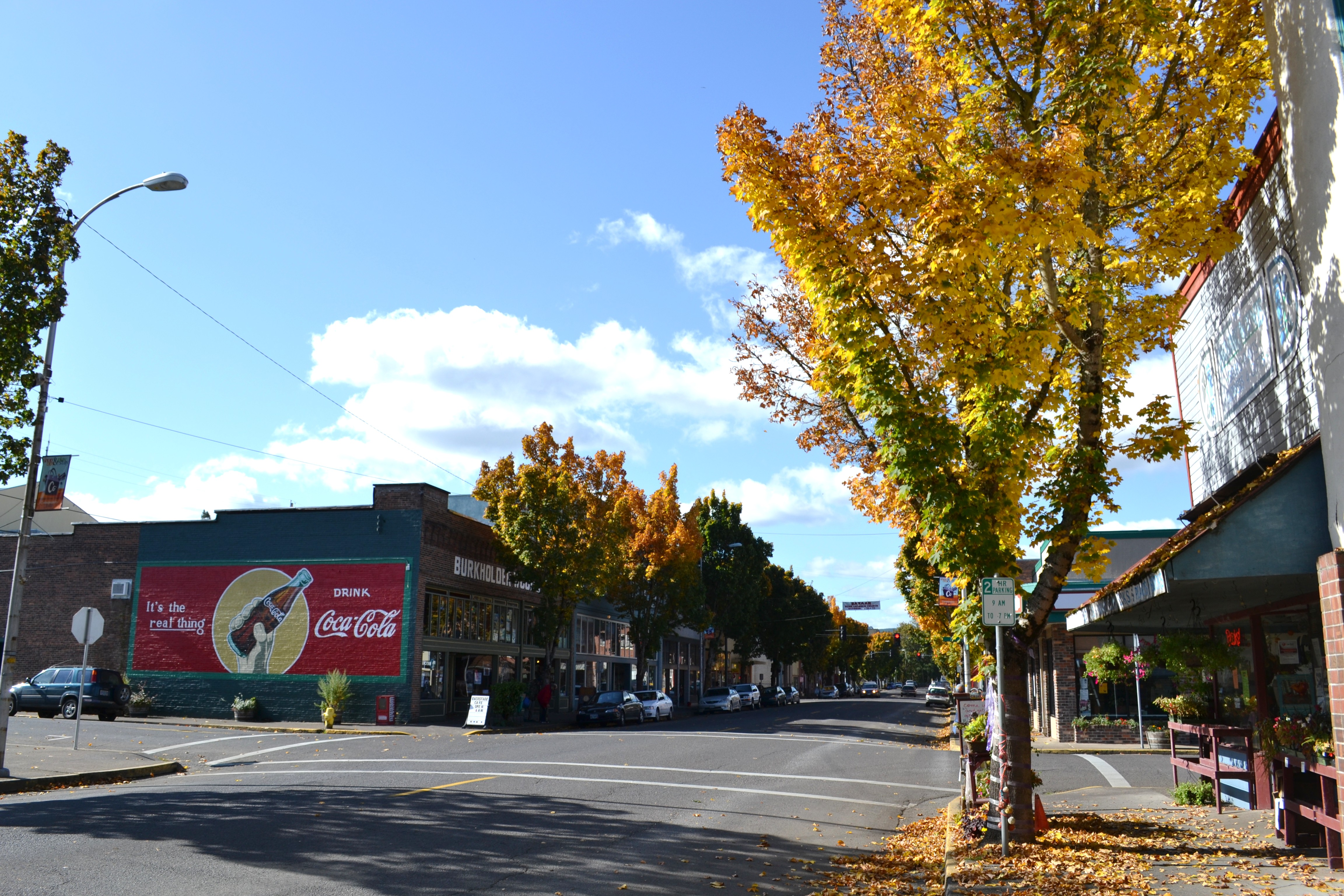
- Cottage Grove Historic District

- Flag
- Nickname: Covered Bridge Capital of Oregon
- Location in Oregon
- Coordinates: 43°47′46″N 123°03′26″W
- Country: United States
- State: Oregon
- County: Lane
- Incorporated: 1887

Government
  - Type: Council-manager
  - City Manager: Michael 'Mike' Sauerwein
  - Mayor: Candace Solesbee

Area
  - Total: 3.89 sq mi (10.08 km^{2})
  - Land: 3.86 sq mi (10.01 km^{2})
  - Water: 0.027 sq mi (0.07 km^{2})
- Elevation: 650 ft (200 m)

Population (2020)
  - Total: 10,574
  - Density: 2,735.9/sq mi (1,056.32/km^{2})
- Time zone: UTC-8 (Pacific)
  - Summer (DST): UTC-7 (Pacific)
- ZIP codes: 97424, 97472
- Area code: 541
- FIPS code: 41-15950
- GNIS feature ID: 2410241
- Website: www.cottagegroveor.gov

Cottage Grove is a city in Lane County, Oregon, United States. Its population was 10,643 at the 2020 census. It is the third largest city in Lane County. It is on Interstate 5, Oregon Route 99, and the main Willamette Valley line of the CORP railroad.

== History ==
Cottage Grove post office was established in 1855 east of present-day Creswell. It was named by its first postmaster, G. C. Pearce, whose home was in an oak grove. In 1861, the office was moved to the present site of Saginaw; then in the late 1860s, to the southwesternmost part of present-day Cottage Grove, on the west bank of the Coast Fork Willamette River. When the Southern Pacific railroad was built through the area in the 1870s, Cottage Grove station was placed more than half a mile northeast of the post office, on the river's east side. This was the start of a neighborhood dispute that lasted for nearly 20 years. The people living near the post office did not want it moved to the railroad station, so a new office was established at the station with the name Lemati, a Chinook Jargon word that means "mountain". Lemati office ran from November 1893 to September 1894, but in March 1898 the Cottage Grove office was renamed Lemati, and ran that way until it was permanently renamed Cottage Grove in May 1898.

Gold mining preceded both agriculture and timber as a major economic driver for the area. Gold was first discovered near Bohemia Mountain southeast of town in 1858, and a small group of prospectors worked the area until the district went idle during the early years of the Civil War. The Bohemia mining district, an area of about nine square miles in the Cascade Range roughly 25 miles southeast of Cottage Grove, became the most productive of the mining areas in the Western Cascades, with mines extracting mostly gold and silver, along with copper, zinc, and lead. By 1865 the district had grown to around 2,000 mines and drew more than 2,000 miners from around the world; proceeds from the district helped fund the founding of Cottage Grove. One mine engineer used his wages to attend the 1893 Chicago World's Fair, where he observed an early electric light plant; on returning, he established Cottage Grove's first electric plant and incandescent lighting system. Mining activity declined gradually, and much of the district was abandoned after the world wars and the Great Depression, as gold mining was not considered essential to wartime production and the industry did not recover its earlier scale afterward.

As mining declined, the timber industry became the dominant sector of the local economy. W.A. Woodard, born in Iowa in 1889, moved to Cottage Grove with his family in 1900 and began working in lumbering at age 11, cutting wood to sell to the local railroad as locomotive fuel. He later worked throughout Oregon helping construct and improve sawmills before establishing his own lumber operations near Cottage Grove. In 1940 he built a mill so modern that it continued operating for decades afterward under Weyerhaeuser; Woodard died in December 1957 in a log-train accident. During his career, the region's timber operations transitioned from draft animals, hand tools, steam donkeys, and log flumes to diesel trucks, chainsaws, and modern milling methods. He was later described in local histories as one of Oregon's last large-scale independent lumbermen. After his death, his estate continued to fund community projects through the Woodard Family Foundation.

In the summer of 1926, Cottage Grove was the filming location for Buster Keaton's Civil War-era comedy The General, now regarded as one of the most significant films of the silent era. Keaton's production crew arrived with eighteen freight cars of Civil War-era cannons, stagecoaches, prairie schooners, props, cameras, and more than 1,200 costumes, and built a temporary set town while recruiting local residents and National Guardsmen for battle scenes. The area's forested terrain and the tracks of the Oregon, Pacific and Eastern Railroad were used to represent wartime Georgia. The production included what was then the most expensive stunt filmed during the silent era: a locomotive crashing off a collapsing bridge into a ravine. The film premiered in Portland on December 31, 1926, followed by a Cottage Grove premiere the following month. It received mixed reviews and did not recoup its production costs at the time, but was later reassessed as one of the greatest American films, ranking eighteenth on the American Film Institute's 2007 list of the 100 greatest American films. The city commemorates the production annually with Buster Keaton Days, and a mural depicting Keaton on the train's cowcatcher is painted on the building where he stayed during filming.

Cottage Grove's rail corridor and small-town Main Street continued to draw film and television productions after The General, reinforcing the city's association with the movie industry. Later productions filmed along the former rail line included Stand By Me, starring River Phoenix, and Emperor of the North, starring Ernest Borgnine. The famous parade sequence in Animal House was also filmed on Cottage Grove's downtown Main Street.

In the late 1940s, the U.S. Army Corps of Engineers constructed Dorena Dam on the Row River east of Cottage Grove as part of a regional flood-control system. The project required relocating the town of Dorena, along with roughly 100 homes, five miles upriver to make way for the reservoir. The resulting Dorena Lake became a recreational destination, drawing an estimated 80,000 visitors annually for fishing, boating, and camping, while the dam also generates hydropower. The Oregon, Pacific and Eastern Railroad, which had carried ore, logs, and passengers along the Row River since the mining era, continued operating into the late twentieth century before being abandoned. In 1992, a multi-agency and citizen working group began planning to convert the abandoned rail corridor into a public trail, and the Bureau of Land Management acquired 14 miles of the former right-of-way in 1993 as settlement for a debt from a timber sale default. The resulting Row River Trail, a paved multi-use path connecting Cottage Grove to Dorena Lake and Culp Creek, officially opened in 1998.

The only existing covered railroad bridge west of the Mississippi River, the National Register of Historic Places-listed Chambers Railroad Bridge, is in Cottage Grove. The city restored the bridge in 2011, reopening it on December 3.

Alongside its continued reliance on the declining regional timber industry, the city pursued downtown preservation and revitalization efforts in the latter half of the twentieth century, work recognized when it received the National Civic League's All-America City Award in 1968 and again in 2004. The city has since been designated a Tree City USA by the Arbor Day Foundation for more than a decade, and in October 2008 it became the seventeenth city in the United States recognized as a Green Power Community.

=== Lemati ===
Cottage Grove was incorporated in 1887, but the people on the city's east side rebelled in 1893 and founded East Cottage Grove. The Oregon State Legislature changed its name to Lemati in 1895; the train station's signboard said "Cottage Grove", with "Lemati" appearing in smaller letters. In 1899 an act was passed that consolidated the two towns as Cottage Grove.

== Geography ==
According to the United States Census Bureau, the city has a total area of 3.77 square miles (9.76 km^{2}), of which 3.76 square miles (9.74 km^{2}) is land and 0.01 square miles (0.03 km^{2}) is water.

Cottage Grove lies south of the confluence of the Row River and the Coast Fork of the Willamette River. This confluence effectively marks the southern end of the Willamette Valley.

=== Climate ===
This region experiences warm (but not hot) and dry summers, with no average monthly temperatures above 71.6 °F (22.0 °C). According to the Köppen Climate Classification system, Cottage Grove has a warm-summer Mediterranean climate, abbreviated Csb on climate maps.

Climate data for Cottage Grove (1991–2020 normals, extremes 1916–present)
Month	Jan	Feb	Mar	Apr	May	Jun	Jul	Aug	Sep	Oct	Nov	Dec	Year
Record high °F (°C)	71 (22)	76 (24)	83 (28)	87 (31)	98 (37)	105 (41)	105 (41)	105 (41)	105 (41)	96 (36)	77 (25)	73 (23)	105 (41)
Mean maximum °F (°C)	61.7 (16.5)	64.6 (18.1)	71.8 (22.1)	78.6 (25.9)	86.4 (30.2)	90.3 (32.4)	95.5 (35.3)	96.3 (35.7)	92.1 (33.4)	80.3 (26.8)	67.9 (19.9)	61.1 (16.2)	98.8 (37.1)
Mean daily maximum °F (°C)	48.1 (8.9)	51.7 (10.9)	56.3 (13.5)	61.1 (16.2)	67.8 (19.9)	73.2 (22.9)	82.0 (27.8)	82.6 (28.1)	76.5 (24.7)	64.1 (17.8)	53.0 (11.7)	46.7 (8.2)	63.6 (17.6)
Daily mean °F (°C)	40.7 (4.8)	42.7 (5.9)	45.8 (7.7)	49.7 (9.8)	55.6 (13.1)	60.5 (15.8)	66.6 (19.2)	66.5 (19.2)	61.3 (16.3)	52.6 (11.4)	45.0 (7.2)	40.0 (4.4)	52.3 (11.2)
Mean daily minimum °F (°C)	33.4 (0.8)	33.8 (1.0)	35.3 (1.8)	38.3 (3.5)	43.5 (6.4)	47.8 (8.8)	51.1 (10.6)	50.4 (10.2)	46.1 (7.8)	41.0 (5.0)	37.1 (2.8)	33.3 (0.7)	40.9 (4.9)
Mean minimum °F (°C)	22.9 (−5.1)	24.0 (−4.4)	27.6 (−2.4)	30.1 (−1.1)	34.0 (1.1)	39.6 (4.2)	43.3 (6.3)	43.0 (6.1)	37.3 (2.9)	30.9 (−0.6)	26.8 (−2.9)	23.1 (−4.9)	18.4 (−7.6)
Record low °F (°C)	−2 (−19)	0 (−18)	14 (−10)	21 (−6)	23 (−5)	29 (−2)	34 (1)	32 (0)	24 (−4)	17 (−8)	9 (−13)	−4 (−20)	−4 (−20)
Average precipitation inches (mm)	6.57 (167)	4.86 (123)	5.24 (133)	4.46 (113)	3.11 (79)	1.67 (42)	0.40 (10)	0.53 (13)	1.54 (39)	3.75 (95)	6.77 (172)	7.57 (192)	46.47 (1,180)
Average snowfall inches (cm)	0.9 (2.3)	1.1 (2.8)	0.3 (0.76)	0.0 (0.0)	0.0 (0.0)	0.0 (0.0)	0.0 (0.0)	0.0 (0.0)	0.0 (0.0)	0.0 (0.0)	0.0 (0.0)	0.4 (1.0)	2.7 (6.9)
Average precipitation days (≥ 0.01 in)	21.1	18.3	20.4	18.4	12.7	8.9	2.5	2.8	6.2	15.6	21.4	21.8	170.1
Average snowy days (≥ 0.1 in)	0.4	0.6	0.4	0.0	0.0	0.0	0.0	0.0	0.0	0.0	0.0	0.3	1.7
Source: NOAA

== Demographics ==
Historical population
Census	Pop.	Note	%±
1900	974		—
1910	1,834		88.3%
1920	1,919		4.6%
1930	2,473		28.9%
1940	2,626		6.2%
1950	3,536		34.7%
1960	3,895		10.2%
1970	6,004		54.1%
1980	7,148		19.1%
1990	7,402		3.6%
2000	8,432		13.9%
2010	9,686		14.9%
2020	10,574		9.2%
U.S. Decennial Census

=== 2020 census ===
As of the 2020 census, Cottage Grove had a population of 10,574. The median age was 39.7 years. 23.3% of residents were under the age of 18 and 19.4% of residents were 65 years of age or older. For every 100 females there were 95.4 males, and for every 100 females age 18 and over there were 92.0 males age 18 and over.

100.0% of residents lived in urban areas, while <0.1% lived in rural areas.

There were 4,078 households in Cottage Grove, of which 32.3% had children under the age of 18 living in them. Of all households, 41.8% were married-couple households, 18.7% were households with a male householder and no spouse or partner present, and 29.5% were households with a female householder and no spouse or partner present. About 27.3% of all households were made up of individuals and 13.9% had someone living alone who was 65 years of age or older.

There were 4,251 housing units, of which 4.1% were vacant. Among occupied housing units, 60.1% were owner-occupied and 39.9% were renter-occupied. The homeowner vacancy rate was 1.0% and the rental vacancy rate was 3.9%.

Racial composition as of the 2020 census
Race	Number	Percent
White	8,580	81.1%
Black or African American	45	0.4%
American Indian and Alaska Native	169	1.6%
Asian	106	1.0%
Native Hawaiian and Other Pacific Islander	16	0.2%
Some other race	578	5.5%
Two or more races	1,080	10.2%
Hispanic or Latino (of any race)	1,217	11.5%

=== 2010 census ===
As of the census of 2010, there were 9,686 people, 3,895 households, and 2,469 families living in the city. The population density was 2,576.1 inhabitants per square mile (994.6/km^{2}). There were 4,154 housing units at an average density of 1,104.8 per square mile (426.6/km^{2}). The racial makeup of the city was 90.4% White, 0.3% African American, 1.3% Native American, 1.1% Asian, 0.1% Pacific Islander, 3.1% from other races, and 3.8% from two or more races. Hispanic or Latino of any race were 8.0% of the population.

There were 3,895 households, of which 32.2% had children under the age of 18 living with them, 43.8% were married couples living together, 14.8% had a female householder with no husband present, 4.9% had a male householder with no wife present, and 36.6% were non-families. 29.9% of all households were made up of individuals, and 14.1% had someone living alone who was 65 years of age or older. The average household size was 2.47 and the average family size was 3.02.

The median age in the city was 38.3 years. 24.4% of residents were under the age of 18; 8.5% were between the ages of 18 and 24; 25.1% were from 25 to 44; 25.3% were from 45 to 64; and 16.5% were 65 years of age or older. The gender makeup of the city was 48.0% male and 52.0% female.

=== 2000 census ===
As of the census of 2000, there were 8,445 people, 3,264 households, and 2,183 families living in the city. The population density was 2,561.6 inhabitants per square mile (989.0/km^{2}). There were 3,430 housing units at an average density of 1,040.4 per square mile (401.7/km^{2}). The racial makeup of the city was 92.84% White, 0.15% African American, 1.21% Native American, 0.92% Asian, 0.09% Pacific Islander, 1.55% from other races, and 3.23% from two or more races. Hispanic or Latino of any race were 4.94% of the population. There were 3,264 households, out of which 33.0% had children under the age of 18 living with them, 49.4% were married couples living together, 13.2% had a female householder with no husband present, and 33.1% were non-families. 28.1% of all households were made up of individuals, and 14.3% had someone living alone who was 65 years of age or older. The average household size was 2.54 and the average family size was 3.05.

In the city, the population dispersal was 27.4% under the age of 18, 8.5% from 18 to 24, 26.4% from 25 to 44, 21.7% from 45 to 64, and 16.0% who were 65 years of age or older. The median age was 37 years. For every 100 females, there were 92.1 males. For every 100 females age 18 and over, there were 86.5 males. The median income for a household in the city was $30,442, and the median income for a family was $37,457. Males had a median income of $30,775 versus $23,485 for females. The per capita income for the city was $14,550. About 15.6% of families and 19.8% of the population were below the poverty line, including 29.0% of those under age 18 and 13.0% of those age 65 or over.

== Arts and culture ==
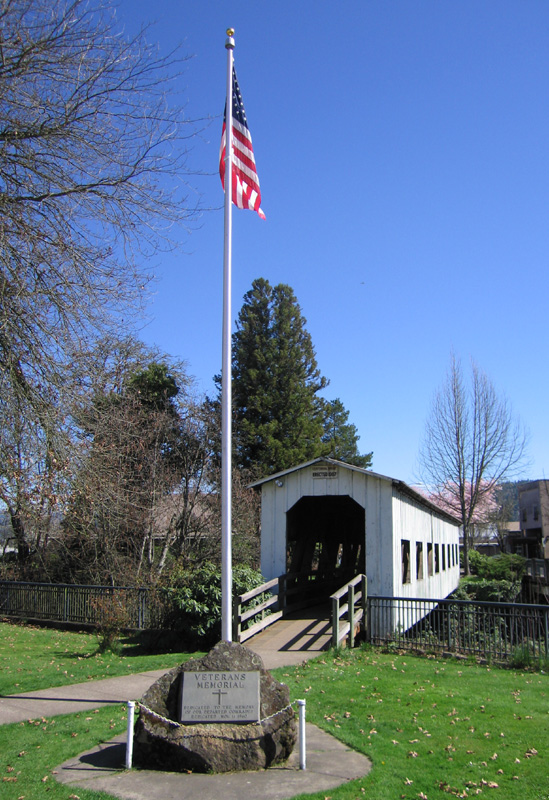
Centennial Bridge and Veterans Memorial

=== Annual cultural events ===
The largest festivals in Cottage Grove are Bohemia Mining Days (third weekend in July) and the Western Oregon Exposition Heritage Fair (third weekend in August).

=== Museums and other points of interest ===
Cottage Grove is known as the "Covered Bridge Capital of The West" with six covered bridges near the city. Five of the six bridges, Chambers Covered Bridge, Currin Bridge, Dorena Bridge, Mosby Creek Bridge, and Stewart Bridge, are listed on the National Register of Historic Places. Centennial Covered Bridge is a replica bridge constructed from materials salvaged from dismantled bridges. The Swinging Bridge is a historic suspension footbridge.

It is home to 21 murals throughout downtown reflecting the community's history.

The Cottage Theatre and the Opal Center for Arts and Education offer live theatre productions year-round.

Cottage Grove has four museums:

- The Cottage Grove Historical Museum, filled with vintage photographs and artifacts, including a coat worn by a survivor of the 1912 shipwreck of the RMS Titanic
- The Bohemia Gold Mining Museum, illustrating the area's gold mining history in the nearby Bohemia Mining District
- The Oregon Aviation History Center, preserving Oregon's rich aviation history, including some vintage aircraft restoration projects.
- The Dr. Snapp House, with artifacts of early medical practices; built in 1886 by one of the community's first doctors, the Queen Anne–style home is owned and maintained by the Prospectors' and Gold Diggers' Club.

=== Filming location ===
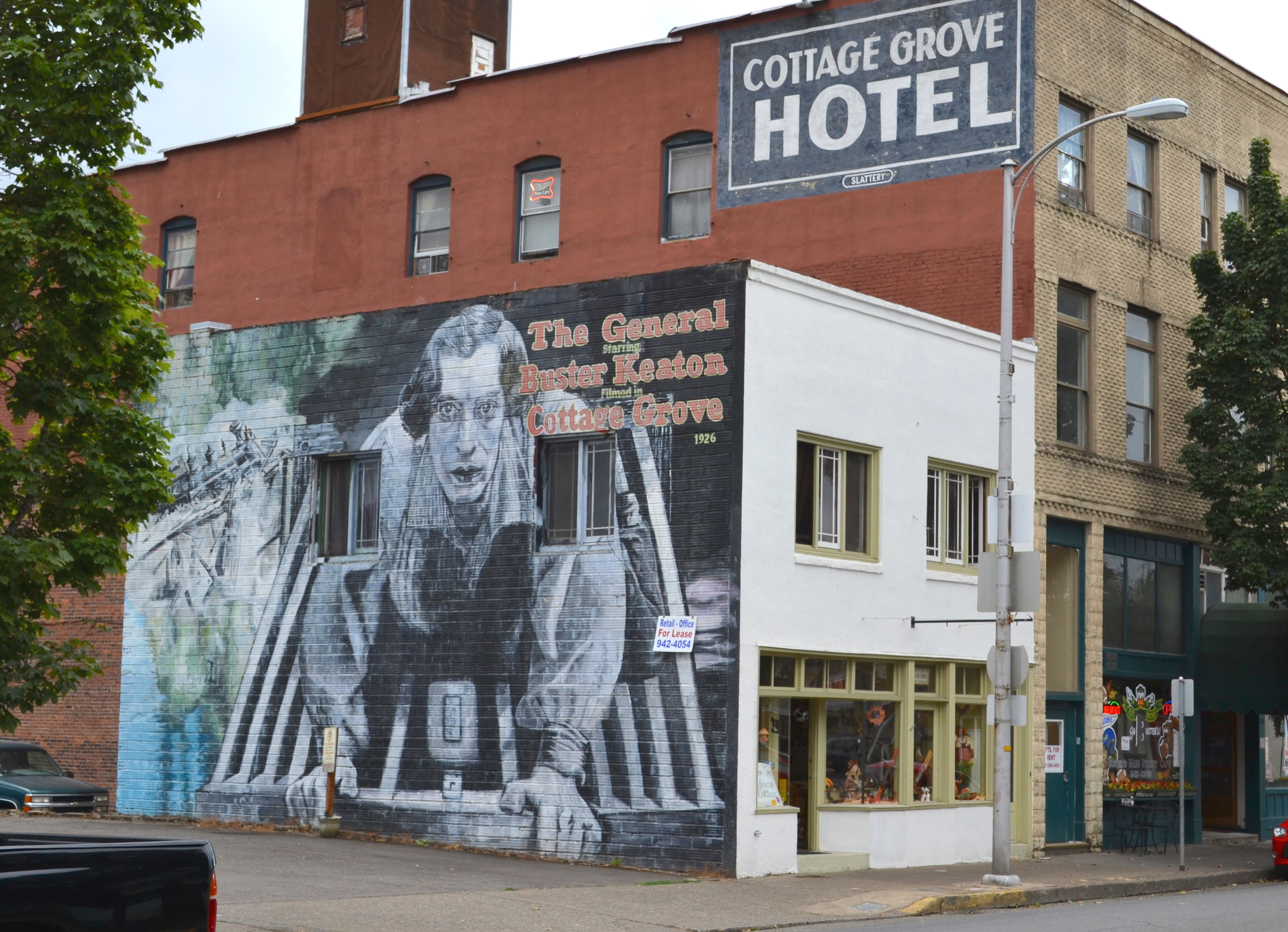
The General signage in Cottage Grove where the cast and crew stayed

Several films have been filmed in Cottage Grove:

- Buster Keaton's The General (1926) in town and the surrounding countryside; the film included a spectacular locomotive crash, and the wrecked train was a minor tourist attraction until it was dismantled for scrap during World War II
- Emperor of the North Pole (1973)
- Parts of Animal House (1978); citizens celebrated the film's 25th-anniversary release with a toga party on August 30, 2003, on Main Street, where the movie's climactic parade sequence was filmed
- Portions of Stand By Me (1986), along the railroad tracks east of town (now the Row River National Recreation Trail, a bicycle and walking trail)
- Ricochet River (1997) starring Kate Hudson

== Sports ==
Cottage Grove has two golf courses. Middlefield is owned and operated by the City of Cottage Grove. It is a challenging 18-hole executive course surrounded by mature landscaping and next to Interstate 5. Middlefield also has a disc golf course. Hidden Valley is a privately owned 10-hole course nestled along the northern slope of Mount David, featuring numerous gigantic oak trees and bounded by Bennett Creek and the Coast Fork of the Willamette River. Coiner Park offers tennis, pickleball and basketball courts. South Lane School District has a newly renovated aquatic center and its high school athletic facilities are often used for regional and state athletic events.

== Parks and recreation ==
Dorena Lake and Cottage Grove Lake are near the city and offer picnicking, camping, and boating facilities. The Row River National Recreation Trail is a 14-mile (23 km) paved, multi-use trail that begins in Cottage Grove's Historic Downtown District and follows the route of the now-abandoned Oregon Pacific & Eastern Railroad line along the shores of the Row River and Dorena Reservoir.

== Education ==
The South Lane School District serves Cottage Grove and the surrounding area. Cottage Grove High School, Al Kennedy High School, Lincoln Middle School, Bohemia and Harrison elementary schools and the Academy for Character Education are in the city. Dorena School (K–8) and the Child's Way Charter School (5–12) are rural schools located in the Row River Valley east of Cottage Grove. London School (K–8) is a rural school located south of Cottage Grove Lake. Lane Community College has a Cottage Grove satellite campus offering credit and enrichment courses.

== Media ==
Founded in 1909, the Cottage Grove Sentinel (circulation: 3,331) is the city's weekly newspaper. KNND is the local radio station.

== Infrastructure ==
=== Transportation ===
==== Air ====
Jim Wright Field is a public airport serving small general aviation aircraft, located one mile (1.6 km) east of Cottage Grove.

==== Bus ====
Lane Transit District runs bus service to nearby Eugene and Springfield. South Lane Wheels offers a shuttle and door-to-door service in Cottage Grove.

== Notable people ==
- Dyrol Burleson
- Diane Downs
- Dennis Dunaway
- Everett W. Holstrom
- Richard Swift
- Opal Whiteley

== See also ==
- List of Oregon covered bridges
