= Dorena Reservoir =

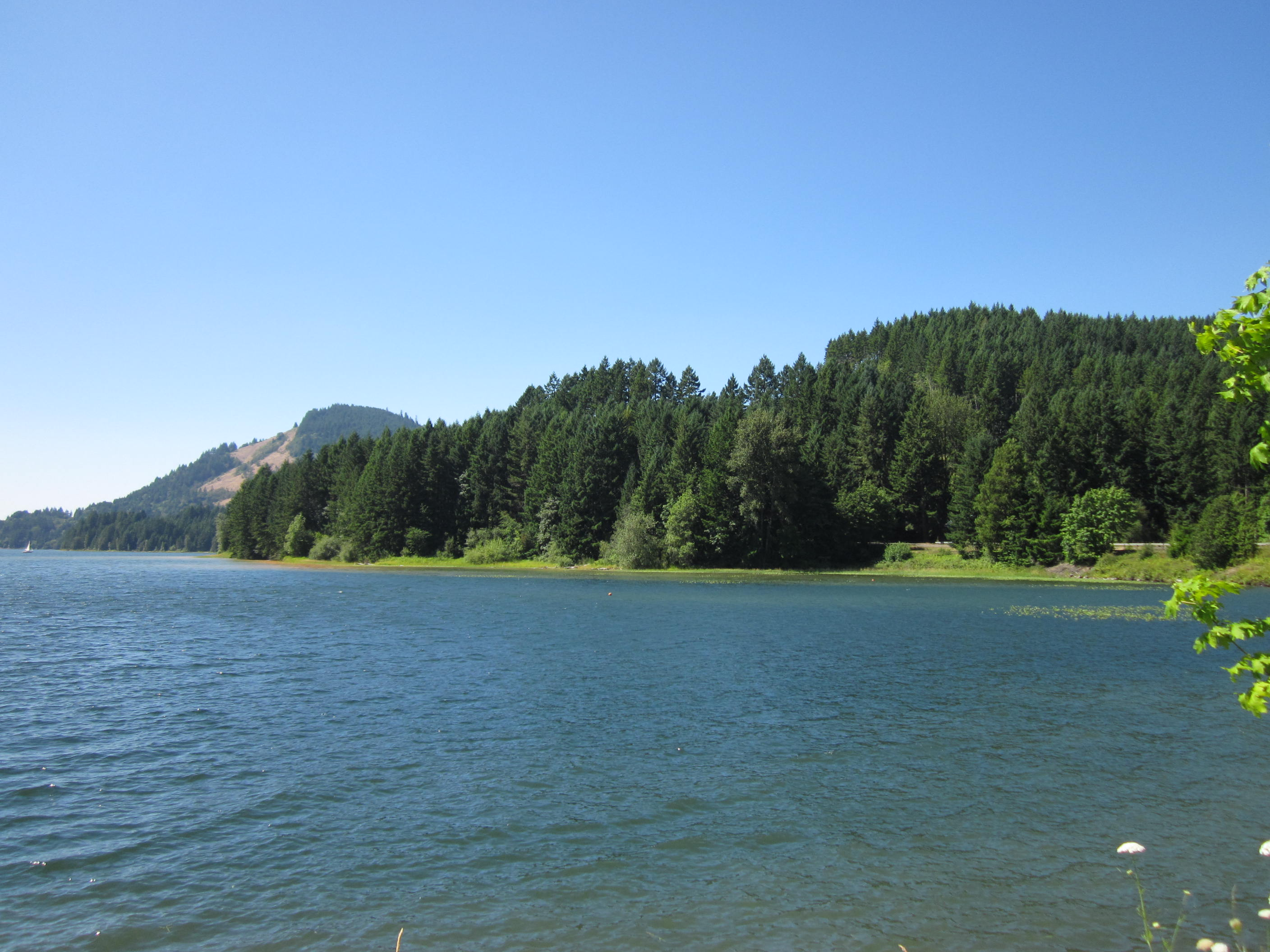
- Dorena Reservoir

- Location within Oregon Location within the United States
- Location: Lane County, Oregon, United States
- Coordinates: 43°47′12″N 122°57′16″W
- Type: Reservoir
- Primary inflows: Row River
- Primary outflows: Row River
- Catchment area: 265 mi^{2} (690 km^{2})
- Basin countries: United States
- Surface area: 1,840 acres (740 ha)
- Average depth: 42 ft (13 m)
- Max. depth: 97 ft (30 m)
- Water volume: 77,600 acre⋅ft (95,700 dam^{3})
- Residence time: 1.7 months
- Shore length^{1}: 13 mi (21 km)
- Surface elevation: 835 ft (255 m)
- ^{1} Shore length is not a well-defined measure.

Dorena Reservoir (also Dorena Lake) is a reservoir on the Row River in Lane County, Oregon, United States. It is located 6 miles (9.7 km) east of Cottage Grove.

The Dorena Dam in front of the reservoir was completed in 1949 as one of the 13 dams of the United States Army Corps of Engineers in the Willamette River's basin.

Set at the south end of the Willamette Valley and criss-crossed by the Coast Fork Willamette River and its tributary the Row River, the area was susceptible to periodic flooding from large rains and snow melts in the surrounding mountains prior to the construction of the dam.

In the 1940s the United States Army Corps of Engineers began construction of dams which created Cottage Grove Lake and Dorena Lake. Dorena Lake is a popular summer vacation destination. Amenities include Baker Bay Marina and Schwarz Park campground. Visitor estimates top 80,000 people annually.

== See also ==
- List of lakes in Oregon
