= Row River =

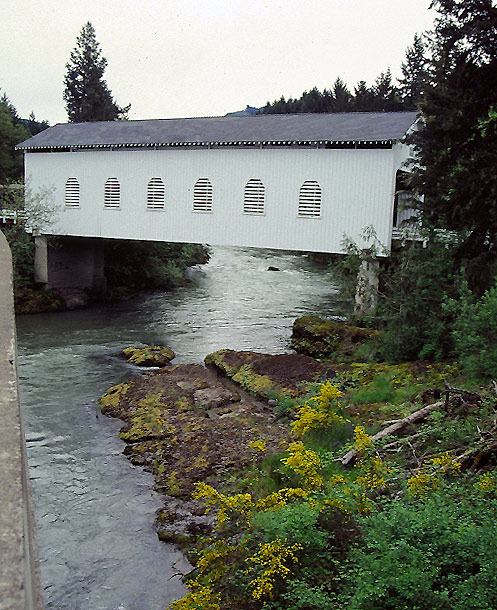
- Dorena Bridge over the Row River

- Location of the mouth of the Row River in Oregon
- Etymology: A dispute or row between two brothers-in-law who lived near the stream

Location
- Country: United States
- State: Oregon
- County: Lane

Physical characteristics
- Source: Cascade Range
  - location: Confluence of Brice Creek and Layng Creek, Lane County, Oregon
  - coordinates: 43°42′13″N 122°46′13″W
  - elevation: 1,121 ft (342 m)
- Mouth: Coast Fork Willamette River
  - location: near Cottage Grove, Lane County, Oregon, United States
  - coordinates: 43°49′14″N 123°02′36″W
  - elevation: 617 ft (188 m)
- Length: 20 mi (32 km)
- Discharge
  - location: near Cottage Grove, 5.5 miles (8.9 km) from mouth
  - average: 728 cu ft/s (20.6 m^{3}/s)
  - minimum: 0.20 cu ft/s (0.0057 m^{3}/s)
  - maximum: 21,400 cu ft/s (610 m^{3}/s)

The Row River is a river, approximately 20 miles (32 km) long, in Lane County, Oregon, United States. It rises in the Cascade Range and flows into the Coast Fork Willamette River near Cottage Grove. The stream was originally known as the "East Fork Coast Fork", but was later renamed after a dispute (row) between neighbors and brothers-in-law George Clark and Joseph Southwell over "trespassing" livestock. Clark was killed as a result of the row. The name rhymes with "cow" rather than with "slow". A post office named Row River operated from 1911 to 1914 a little north of the present site of Dorena at 43.740123°N 122.880347°W.

== Course ==
The Row River, about 20 miles (32 km) long, drains a portion of the Umpqua National Forest on the west face of the central Oregon Cascades between Cottage Grove and Oakridge. Its headwaters are near the unincorporated community of Disston, where Layng Creek and Brice Creek join at 43.70331°N 122.77093°W. The river flows predominately westward.

About 1 mile (1.6 km) below Disston, Gleason Creek enters from the right bank, and about 1 mile (1.6 km) later, the Row receives Hunt Creek from the right and passes over 15-foot (4.6 m) Wildwood Falls at 43.699845°N 122.818954°W. A quarter-mile (500 m) later it passes through Lasells D. Stewart Park, and 1 mile (1.6 km) later through the community of Culp Creek, where it receives Sharps Creek and then Culp Creek, both from the left bank. Turning northwards, the river receives Hawley Creek from the left just above river mile (RM) 15 or river kilometer (RK 24) and shortly thereafter flows through Dorena. At RM 14 (RK 23), Cedar Creek enters from the right. Soon the river turns sharply west, passes a United States Geological Survey (USGS) stream gauge at RM 13.2 (RK 21.2), and turns to the northwest. Over the next stretch, it receives Pitcher Creek, King Creek, and Anderson Creek, all from the left, before entering Dorena Lake at RM 11 (RK 18).

While part of the lake, the Row River receives Vaughn Creek from the left, Smith Creek from the right, Bluff Creek from the left, Rat Creek from the right, and Baker Creek from the left before reaching Dorena Dam and spillway at about RM 7.5 (RK 12.1). The river passes a second USGS stream gauge 5.5 miles (8.9 km) from the mouth, and soon Hann's Creek enters from the right. In its final 5 miles (8 km), the river receives Mosby Creek from the left, turns northwest, flows by Cottage Grove State Airport, and passes under Interstate 5 before entering the Coast Fork Willamette River just below the larger stream's RM 21 (RK 34).

=== Discharge ===
The USGS monitors the flow of the Row River at two gauges, one near Dorena, 13.2 miles (21.2 km) from the mouth and the other above Cottage Grove, 5.5 miles (8.9 km) from the mouth. The average flow of the creek at the Dorena gauge is 589 cubic feet per second (16.7 m^{3}/s). This is from a drainage area of 211 square miles (546.5 km^{2}). The maximum flow recorded there was 33,100 cubic feet per second (940 m^{3}/s) on December 22, 1964, and the minimum flow was 9.7 cubic feet per second (0.27 m^{3}/s) on September 4–6, 2003. At the Cottage Grove gauge, the average flow is 728 cubic feet per second (20.61 m^{3}/s). This is from a drainage area of 270 square miles (700 km^{2}). The maximum flow recorded there was 21,400 cubic feet per second (606 m^{3}/s) on December 28, 1945, and the minimum flow was 0.20 cubic feet per second (0.0057 m^{3}/s) from September 25 to October 7, 1958.

== See also ==
- List of rivers of Oregon
