= List of Art Deco architecture in Oregon =

This is a list of buildings that are examples of the Art Deco architectural style in Oregon, United States.

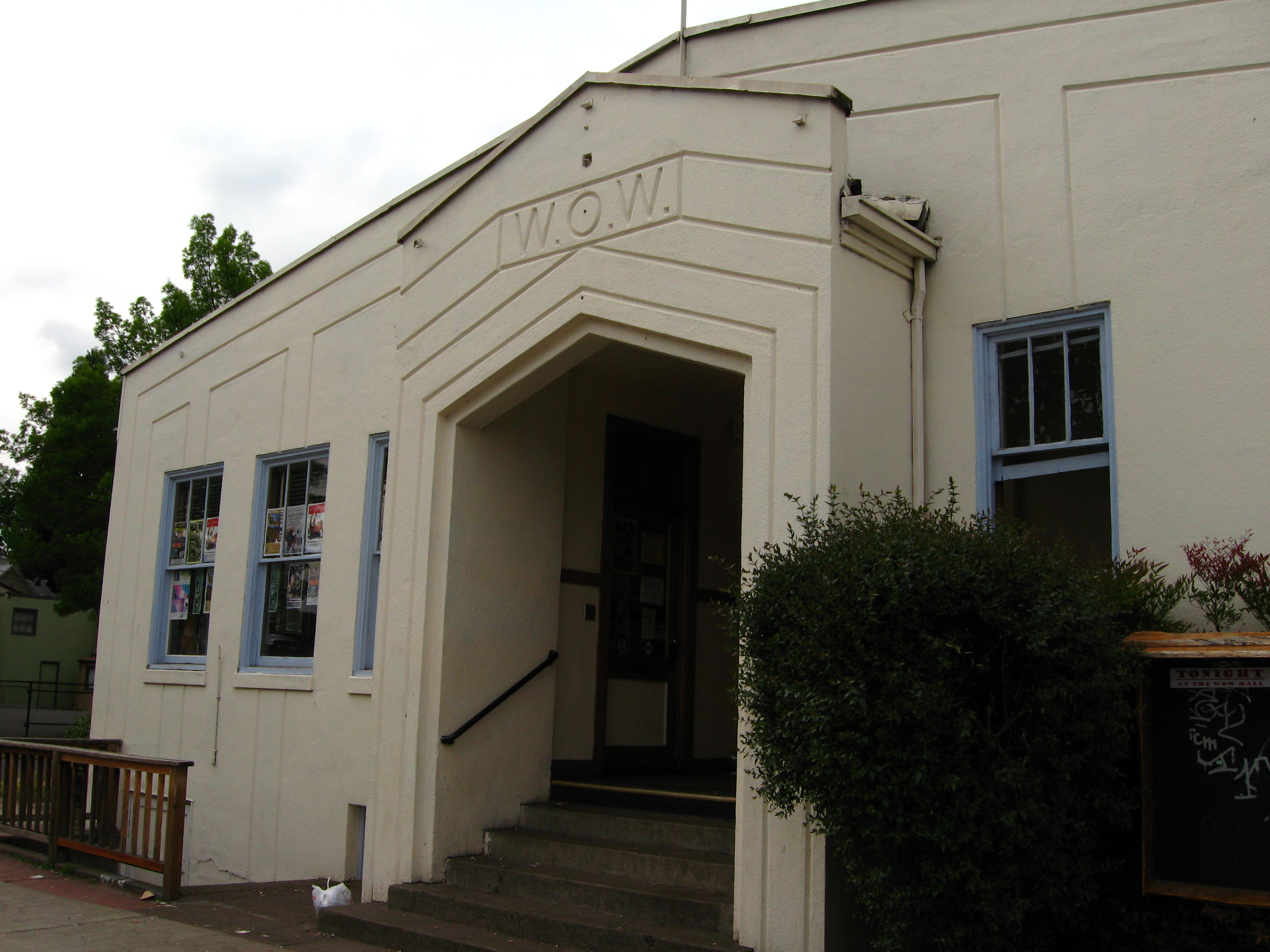
W.O.W. Hall, Eugene

== Eugene ==
- Knight Library, Eugene, 1937
- McCracken Brothers Motor Freight Building, Eugene, 1946
- Schaefers Building, Eugene, 1929
- United States Post Office, Eugene, 1939
- W.O.W. Hall, Eugene, 1932

== Grants Pass ==
- Grants Pass Steam Laundry, Grants Pass, 1903
- Redwoods Hotel, Grants Pass, 1926
- Rogue Theatre, Grants Pass, 1938

== Gresham ==
- Gresham High School Agricultural Building, Gresham, 1940
- Gresham High School Auditorium, Gresham, 1940
- Gresham High School Gymnasium, Gresham, 1940

== Hood River ==
- Butler Bank, Hood River, 1924
- Keir Medical Building, Hood River, 1927
- United States Post Office, Hood River, 1935

== Klamath Falls ==
- First National Bank, Klamath Falls, 1930
- Golden Rule (former JC Penney Building), Klamath Falls, 1937
- Klamath County Armory and Auditorium (now Klamath County Museum), Klamath Falls, 1935
- Oregon Bank Building, Klamath Falls, 1929
- Ross Ragland Theater (former Esquire Theater), Klamath Falls, 1940
- United States National Bank, Klamath Falls, 1937
- Winema Hotel, Klamath Falls, 1930

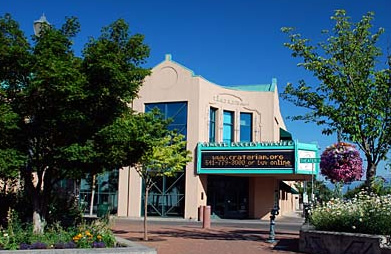
Craterian Theater, Medford

== Medford ==
- Central Medford High School, Medford, 1931
- Cora Knight Addition, Medford, 1930s
- Craterian Theater, Medford, 1924
- Fluhrer Bakery Building, 29 North Holly Street, Medford, 1933
- Hamlin Building East, Medford, 1886 and 1939
- Harry & David Building, Medford, 1937
- Hight Realty, Medford, 1947
- Holly Theatre, Medford, 1930
- Hubbard Hardware/Woods Building, Medford, 1913 and 1941
- J. C. Penney Building, Medford, 1948
- Jackson County Courthouse, Medford, 1932
- Johnson Market Groceteria, Medford, 1927
- Leever Motor Company, Medford, 1947
- Pacific Greyhound Bus Depot, Medford, 1948
- Safeway/Littrell Auto Parts, Medford, 1936, 1945
- Tayler–Phipps Building (now a shoe store), Medford, 1909 and 1937
- Vawter–Brophy Building, Medford, 1907 and 1940s
- Warner, Wortman & Gore Building, Medford, 1900 and 1927
- Washington Elementary School, 610 South Peach Street, Medford, 1931 and 1949
- Winetrout/Crater Lake Ford Building, Medford, 1946
- Young/Humphrey Motors, Medford, 1936

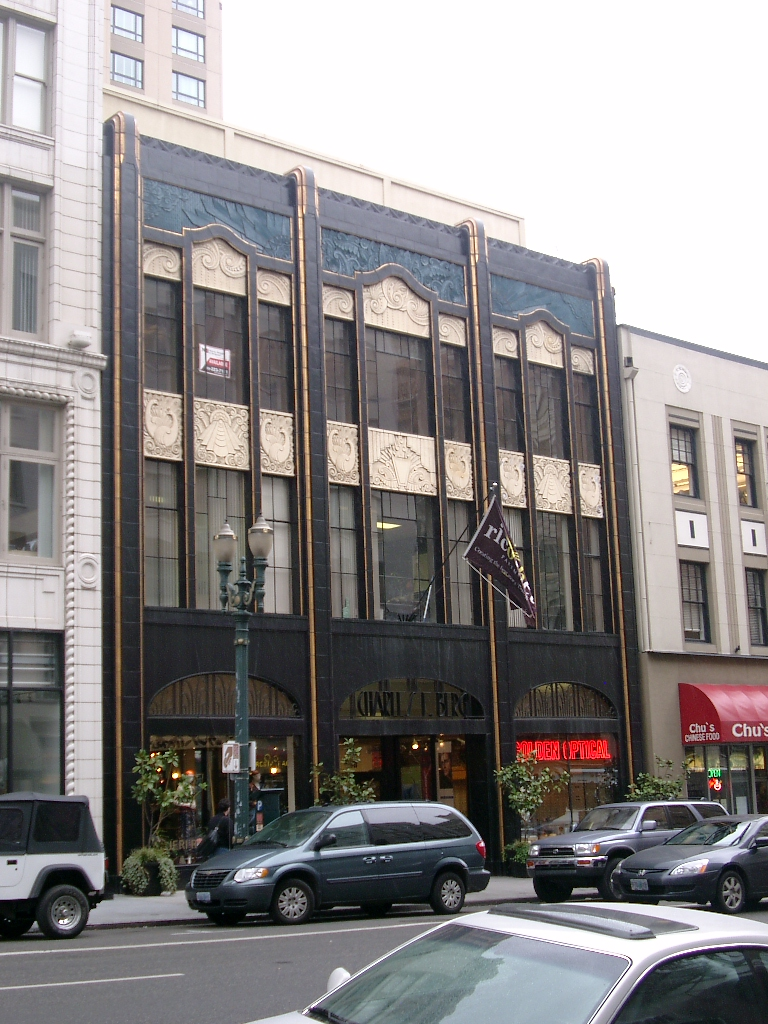
Charles F. Berg Building, Portland

== Portland ==
- Aladdin Theatre, Portland, 1927
- Avalon Theater, Portland, 1925
- Bagdad Theatre, Portland, 1927
- Bertha M. and Marie A. Green House, Portland, 1937
- Canterbury Castle, Portland, 1931
- Capri Apartments, Alphabet Historic District, Portland 1932
- Charles F. Berg Building, Portland, 1902 and 1930
- Coca-Cola Building, Portland, 1941
- Commodore Hotel, Portland, 1925
- Eastside Mortuary Building, Portland, 1930
- Hollywood Theatre, Portland, 1926
- Jantzen Knitting Mills Company Building, Portland, 1929
- Jeanne Manor Apartment Building, Portland, 1931
- Jensen Investment Company Building, Portland, 1930
- Harry A. and Gerda Johnson Building, Kenton Commercial Historic District, Portland, 1922
- Kenyon Building, Kenton Commercial Historic District, Portland, 1951
- Laurelhurst Theater, Portland, 1923
- Metropolitan Apartments, Portland, 1930
- Moreland Theatre, Portland, 1926
- Morris & Lizzie Goldstein Building, Kenton Commercial Historic District, Portland, 1923
- Park Regent Apartments, Portland, 1930
- Portland Art Museum, Portland, 1932
- Regent Apartments, Portland, 1937
- Roseway Theater, Portland, 1924
- St. Johns Signal Tower Gas Station, Portland, 1954
- Sunshine Dairy Plant, Portland, 1936
- Terminal Sales Building, Portland, 1927
- Volunteers of America, East Portland Grand Avenue Historic District, Portland, 1930

== Salem ==
- Corban University Library, Salem, 1935
- Elsinore Theatre, Salem, 1926
- Grand Theatre (former Grand Drugs and International Order of Odd Fellows Building), Salem, 1900 and 1947
- Old West Salem City Hall, Salem, 1935
- Oregon State Capitol, Salem, 1936
- State Library of Oregon, Salem, 1939

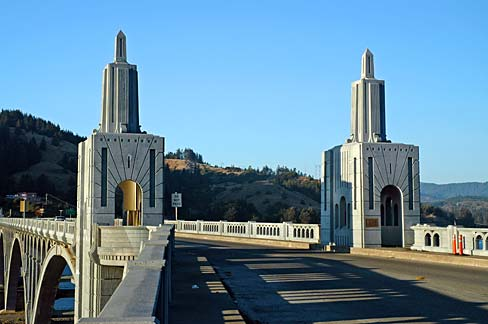
Isaac Lee Patterson Bridge, Gold Beach

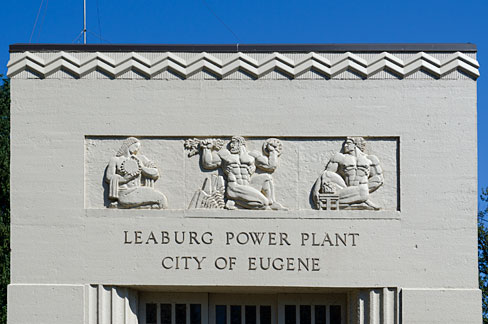
Leaburg Power Plant, Lane County

== Other cities ==
- Alger Theatre, Lakeview, 1940
- Ashland Springs Hotel, Ashland, 1925
- Baker City Tower, Baker City, 1929
- Big Creek Bridge, Heceta Head, 1931
- Cameo Theatre, Newberg, 1937
- Captain Robert Gray School, Astoria
- Celebration Center (former Port Theater), North Bend
- City Hall, Mt. Angel
- Clackamas County Courthouse, Oregon City, 1936
- Coos Art Museum (former Marshfield Post Office), Coos Bay, 1936
- Corvalis High School, Corvallis, 1935
- Cottage Grove Armory, Cottage Grove, 1931
- Dayton High School, Dayton, 1935
- Eltrym Theater, Baker City, 1940
- Forest Theatre, Forest Grove
- Harbor Theatre, Florence, 1938
- Harney County Courthouse, Burns, 1940
- Hub Department Store Building, Coos Bay, 1926 and 1941
- The Hub Restaurant (now Surefire Design), Albany, 1940s
- Isaac Lee Patterson Bridge, Gold Beach to Wedderburn, 1932
- John Jacob Astor Hotel, Astoria, 1923
- Joy Cinema & Pub, Tigard, 1939
- Kuhn Cinema, Lebanon, 1935
- Leaburg Power Plant, Lane County, 1930
- Mack Theater, McMinnville, 1942
- Marshfield High School, Coos Bay, 1939
- Midway Theatre, Newport
- Milton Odem House, Redmond, 1941
- Owyhee Dam, Adrian, 1932
- Palace Theatre, Silverton, 1935
- Pine Theater, Prineville, 1938
- Rio Theatre, Sweet Home, 1950
- Seaside Building, Seaside
- Siuslaw River Bridge, Florence, 1936
- Springdale School, Springdale, 1931
- Springfield Motors Buick Dealership, Springfield, 1952
- Ten Mile Creek Bridge, Lane County, 1931
- Tillamook City Hall (former Tillamook Post Office), Tillamook, 1942
- Toledo History Center (former Toledo City Hall), Toledo
- Tower Theater, Bend, 1940
- Union Pacific Station, Nyssa, 1940s
- United States Post Office, Ontario
- Varsity Theatre, Ashland, 1937
- Vista House, Corbett, 1918
- Wilson River Bridge, Tillamook, 1931

== See also ==
- List of Art Deco architecture
- List of Art Deco architecture in the United States
