= Springdale, Oregon =

Unincorporated community in the state of Oregon, United States

- Unincorporated community
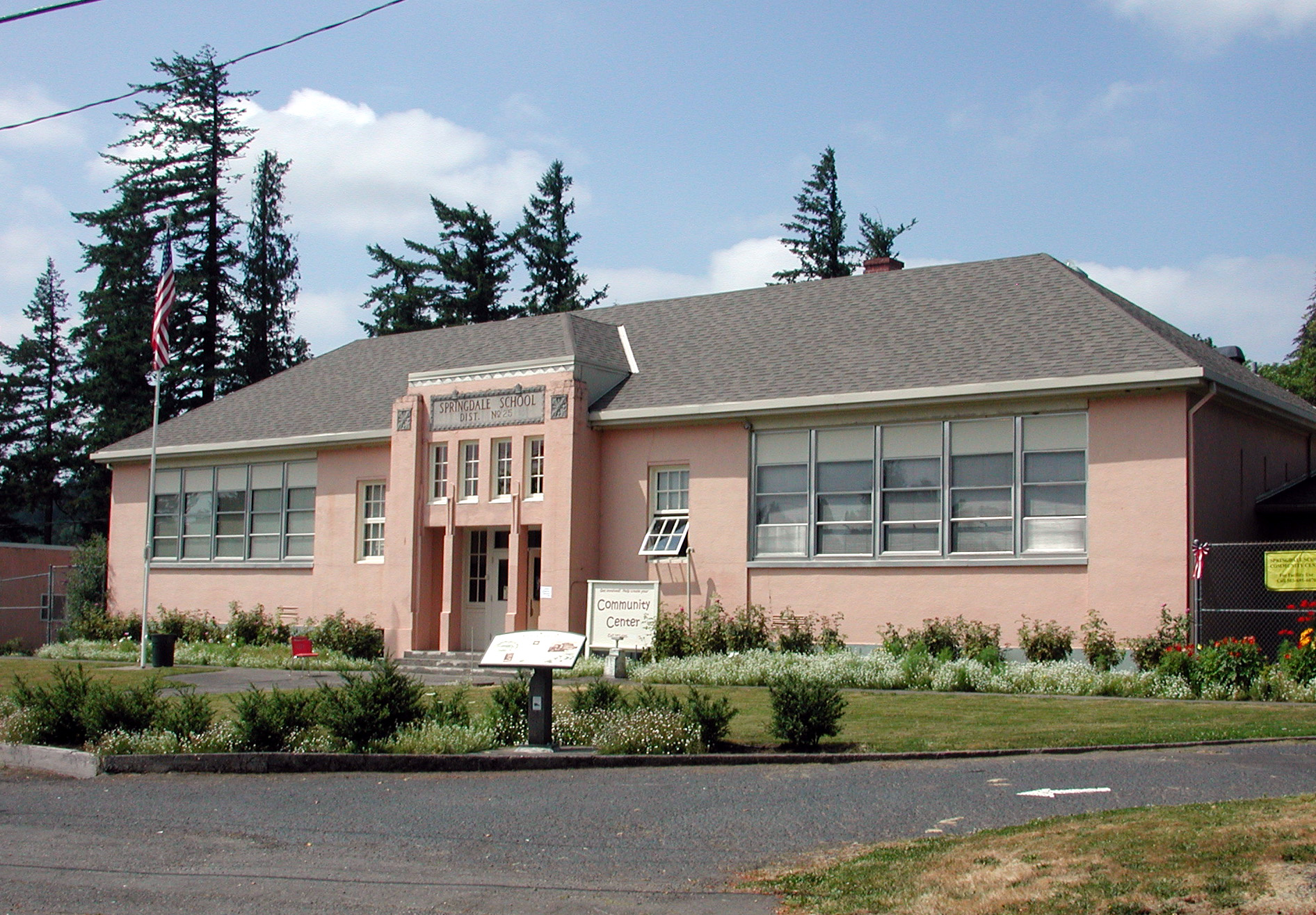
- Springdale Community Center

- Location within Oregon Location within the United States
- Coordinates: 45°31′08″N 122°19′47″W
- Country: United States
- State: Oregon
- County: Multnomah
- Elevation: 308 ft (94 m)
- Time zone: UTC-8 (Pacific (PST))
  - Summer (DST): UTC-7 (PDT)
- ZIP codes: 97060
- GNIS feature ID: 1136776

Springdale is an unincorporated community in Multnomah County in the U.S. state of Oregon. Located between Troutdale and Corbett on the Historic Columbia River Highway, it was named for the many springs in the area. In the 1890s, the east end of the community was called Springdale, but the west end was called Gage. Gage had a post office from 1900 to 1903. The Springdale School, also known as the Springdale Community Center, is listed on the National Register of Historic Places and currently houses the CAPS program of the Corbett School District.
