= Fritz Springmeier =

American author

- Born: Viktor E. Schoof; September 24, 1955 (age 71); Portland, Oregon, U.S.
- Education: Kansas State University
- Occupation: Author
- Spouse: Patricia Springmeier
- Relatives: James E. Schoof (father)
- Writing career
- Genre: Conspiracy literature
- Website: pentracks.com

Fritz Artz Springmeier (born Viktor E. Schoof, September 24, 1955) is an American author of conspiracy theory literature who has written a number of books claiming that a global elite who belong to Satanic bloodlines are conspiring to dominate the world. He has described his goal as "exposing the New World Order agenda."

== Life and career ==
=== Early life ===
Springmeier's father, James E. Schoof, worked for the United States Agency for International Development as an international agriculturist, with a primary focus on developing the Balochistan area of Pakistan.

=== Education ===
Springmeier received a master's degree in English from the University of Kansas.

=== Conspiracy theories ===
Springmeier, formerly a resident of Corbett, Oregon, has written and self-published a number of books based on the subject of the family lineage bloodlines of the Illuminati and their use of mind control. He has also endorsed the existence of Project Monarch, an alleged CIA mind control project, based partially on the assertions of author Cathy O'Brien.

Springmeier's early work, The Watchtower & the Masons, focuses on the relationship between Jehovah's Witnesses and Freemasonry. In this book he describes a relationship between Charles Taze Russell and the so-called "Eastern Establishment". Springmeier followed these links into Masonry and did a further examination of the Eastern establishment.

=== Criminal conviction ===
On January 31, 2002, Springmeier was indicted in the United States District Court in Portland, Oregon in connection with an armed robbery. On February 12, 2003, he was found guilty of one count of armed bank robbery in violation of 18 U.S.C. §§ 2113(a) and (d) and one count of aiding and abetting in the use of a semi-automatic rifle during the commission of a felony in violation of 18 U.S.C § 924(c)(1). In November 2003, he was sentenced to 51 months in prison on the armed robbery charge and 60 months on the aiding and abetting charge, fined $7,500, ordered to pay $6,488 in restitution, and assessed an additional $200. Springmeier's conviction was affirmed by the United States Court of Appeals for the Ninth Circuit. He was imprisoned, and was released from federal prison on March 25, 2011.

== Personal life ==
Fritz Springmeier is married to Patricia Springmeier.

== Selected works ==
- Bloodlines of the Illuminati, Fritz Springmeier, Ambassador House, 1998, ISBN 0-9663533-2-3
- Deeper Insights into the Illuminati Formula, Wheeler, Fritz Springmeier, CreateSpace, 2010, ISBN 1-4515-0269-9
- The Illuminati Formula Used to Create an Undetectable Total Mind Controlled Slave, Cisco Wheeler, Fritz Springmeier, On Demand Publishing, 1996, ASIN B0006QXVU4, ISBN 1-4404-9022-8

== See also ==
- List of conspiracy theories
