= Corbett School District =

School district in Oregon, United States

Corbett School District is a school district serving Corbett, Oregon, United States.

== Schools ==
- Corbett School, a K-12 school with approximately 1200 students which includes a K-8 program,
- Corbett Arts Program with Spanish (CAPS), a K-8 school with approximately 160 students

Corbett Grade School, Middle School and High School are each located on the main campus in Corbett at this time. The CAPS school is housed in the historic Springdale School building in nearby Springdale.
