= Charles Piggott House =

Historic building in Portland, Oregon, U.S.

- U.S. National Register of Historic Places
- Portland Historic Landmark
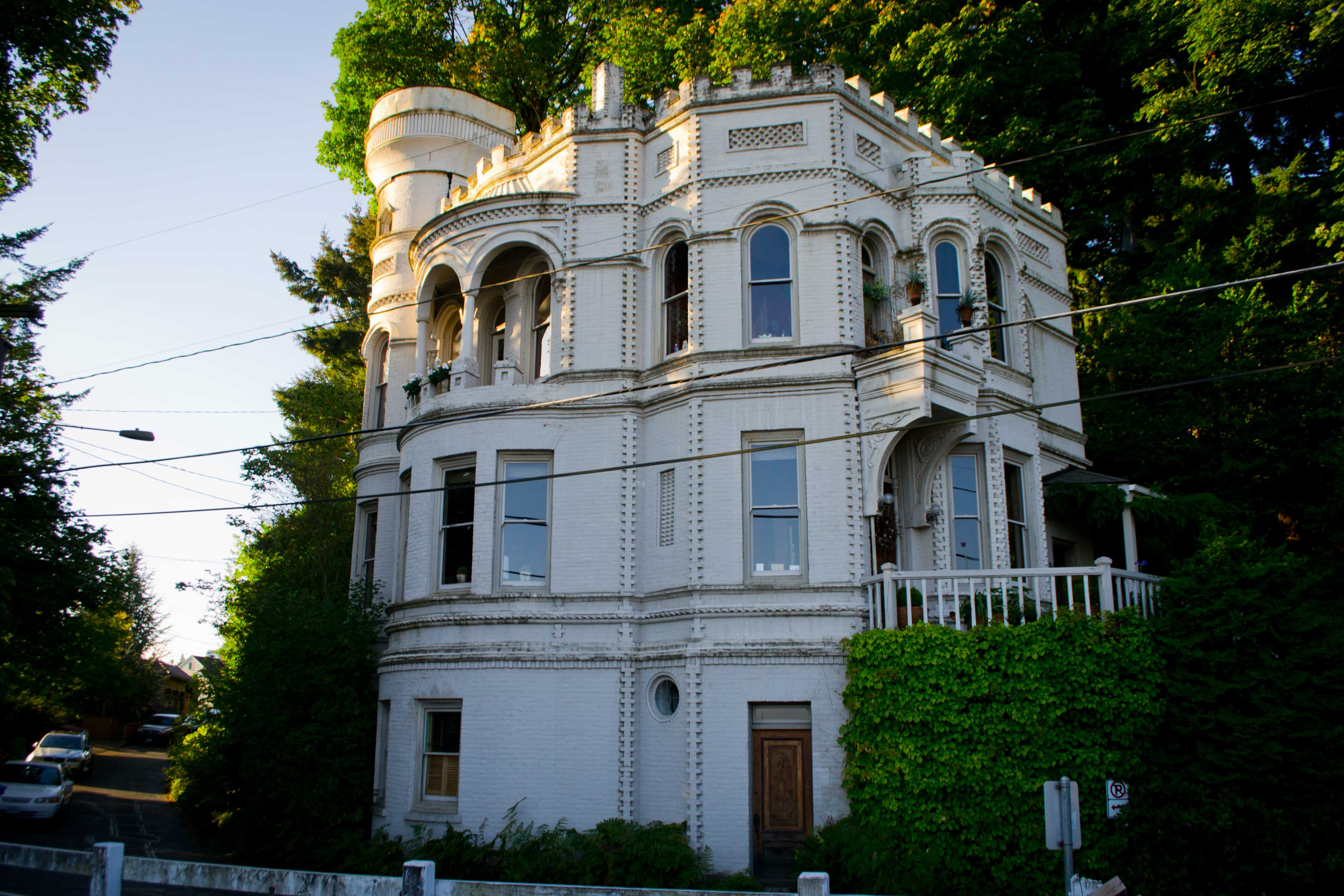
- The house's exterior in 2012

- Location within Portland, Oregon
- Location: 2591 SW Buckingham Avenue; Portland, Oregon
- Coordinates: 45°30′23″N 122°41′14″W
- Area: less than one acre
- Built: 1892
- Architect: Charles Henry Piggott
- Architectural style: Romanesque
- NRHP reference No.: 79002139
- Added to NRHP: March 28, 1979

The Charles Piggott House, also known as Piggott's Castle or Gleall Castle, is a house located in southwest Portland, Oregon, that is listed on the National Register of Historic Places. The house is notable for its Romanesque Revival-style architecture. It is considered Portland's only surviving castle-like home.

== History ==
The castle was first constructed in 1892 by Charles Henry Piggott, a local brick manufacturer, who moved to Portland from San Francisco in 1877. His brickyard on NE Sandy Boulevard supplied the materials for the construction. The architecture was inspired by an illustration of a Roman hilltop fortress.

Once completed, the house featured eleven-foot ceilings, a crenellated parapet, and a tower room. The entrance door includes a molded rail topped with a corbelled entablature, and interior woodwork inlaid with floral patterns and bronze rosettes. Piggott originally named the castle "Gleall Castle". The name came from a combination of the names of his three children, Gladys, Earl and Lloyd.

However, just one year after its completion, Piggot was forced to sell the house due to the economic downturn caused by the Panic of 1893. In 1934, it was converted into residential apartments.

== Preservation and Recognition ==
The Charles Piggott House was added to the National Register of Historic Places on March 29, 1979, for its architectural significance and association with local history.

== See also ==
- National Register of Historic Places listings in Southwest Portland, Oregon
- Canterbury Castle (Portland, Oregon)
- List of castles in the United States
