= John Jacob Astor Hotel =

- U.S. National Register of Historic Places
- U.S. Historic district – Contributing property
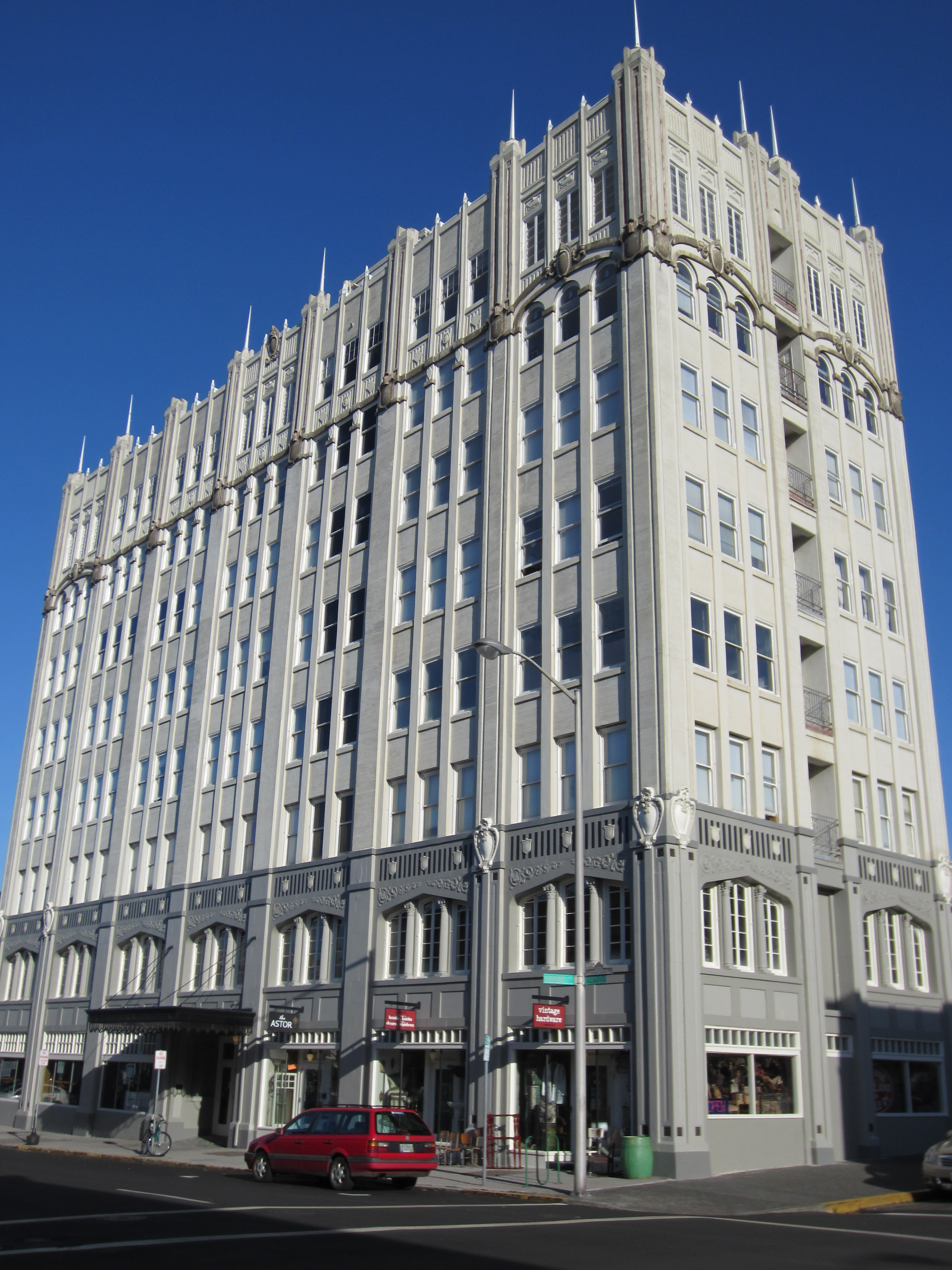
- The former Astor Hotel in 2011

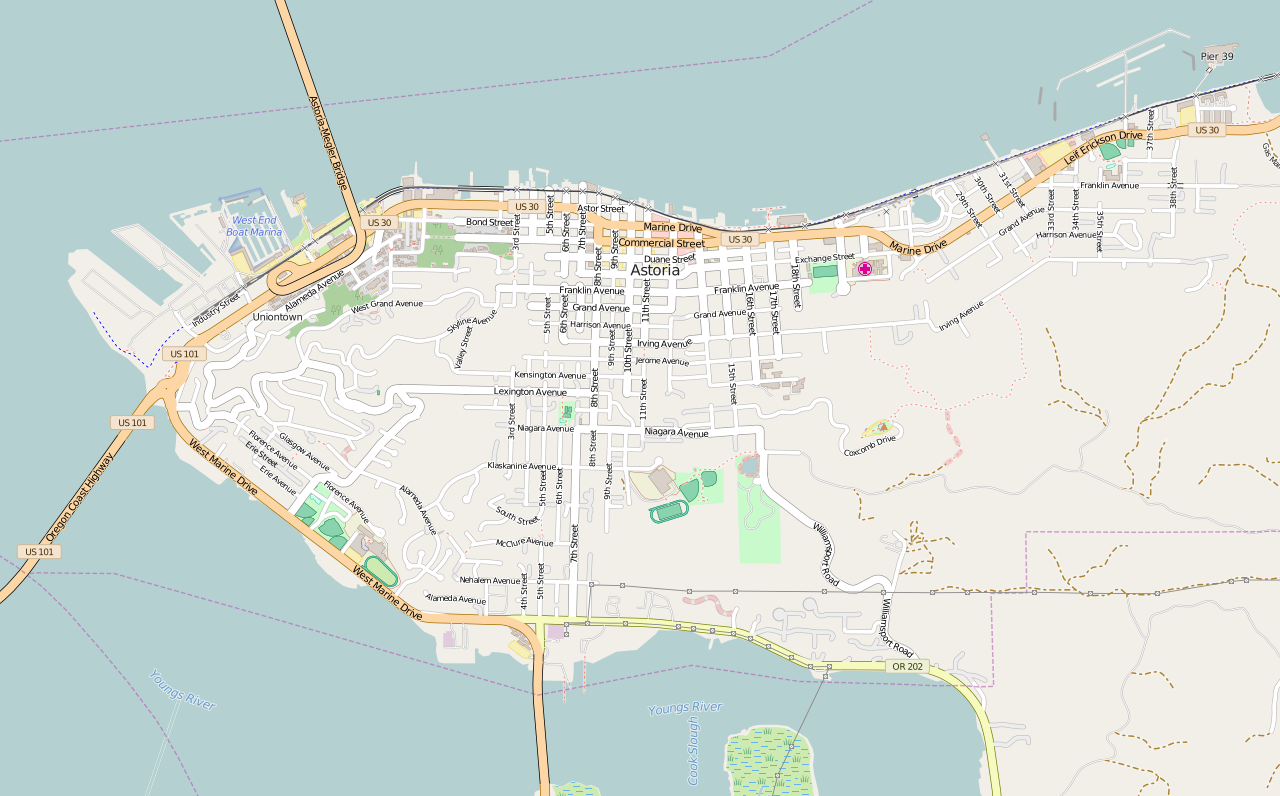
- Location within Astoria OR
- Location: 342 14th Street; Astoria, Oregon
- Coordinates: 46°11′19″N 123°49′42″W
- Built: 1922–1923
- Architect: Tourtellotte & Hummel
- Architectural style: Art Deco; Gothic Revival
- Part of: Astoria Downtown Historic District (ID98000631)
- NRHP reference No.: 79002046
- Added to NRHP: November 16, 1979

The John Jacob Astor Hotel, originally known as the Hotel Astoria, is a historic building located in Astoria, Oregon, United States. Listed on the National Register of Historic Places (NRHP). it is one of the tallest buildings on the Oregon Coast and a "prominent landmark" in Astoria. Constructed in 1922–23, it initially was the city's social and business hub, but soon was beset with a variety of problems and struggled financially for years. It was renamed the John Jacob Astor Hotel in 1951, but a decline in business continued, as did other problems. The building was condemned by the city for safety violations in 1968 and sat vacant for several years until 1984, when work to renovate it and convert it for apartments began. It reopened as an apartment building in 1986, with the lowermost two floors reserved for commercial use. The world's first cable television system was set up in 1948 using an antenna on the roof of the Hotel Astoria.

== History ==
Construction began in November 1922. Plans called for the hotel to be five stories tall, but only a month later a fire destroyed almost all of downtown Astoria. The resulting severe shortage of housing prompted the Columbia Hotel Company to revise the design to increase the structure to eight stories. Construction was completed in late 1923, and the Hotel Astoria opened for business on January 1, 1924.

The hotel was the tallest building in Oregon outside of Portland when completed and the tallest commercial structure on the Oregon Coast. Emporis gives its height as 86 feet (26 m). It was eclipsed by the nine-story, 110-foot-tall (34 m) Marshfield Hotel (now the Tioga Hotel), in Coos Bay, in 1926, when construction of that building's overall structure neared completion. However, work on the Marshfield was soon suspended, and the building stood vacant (its uppermost stories a windowless shell) until the late 1940s, when it was finally completed and opened for use for the first time, as the Tioga Hotel. Until the Tioga Hotel's opening in 1948, the Hotel Astoria remained the tallest commercial structure in use on the Oregon Coast.

Except on its first two floors, the building is L-shaped. On its most prominent side, the west façade, it extends the full length of the block on 14th Street between Commercial and Duane streets. It is nearly as wide on its north side, along Commercial Street, but less than half as wide on its south and east sides. The original exterior color was mainly white, with gray on the first two floors.

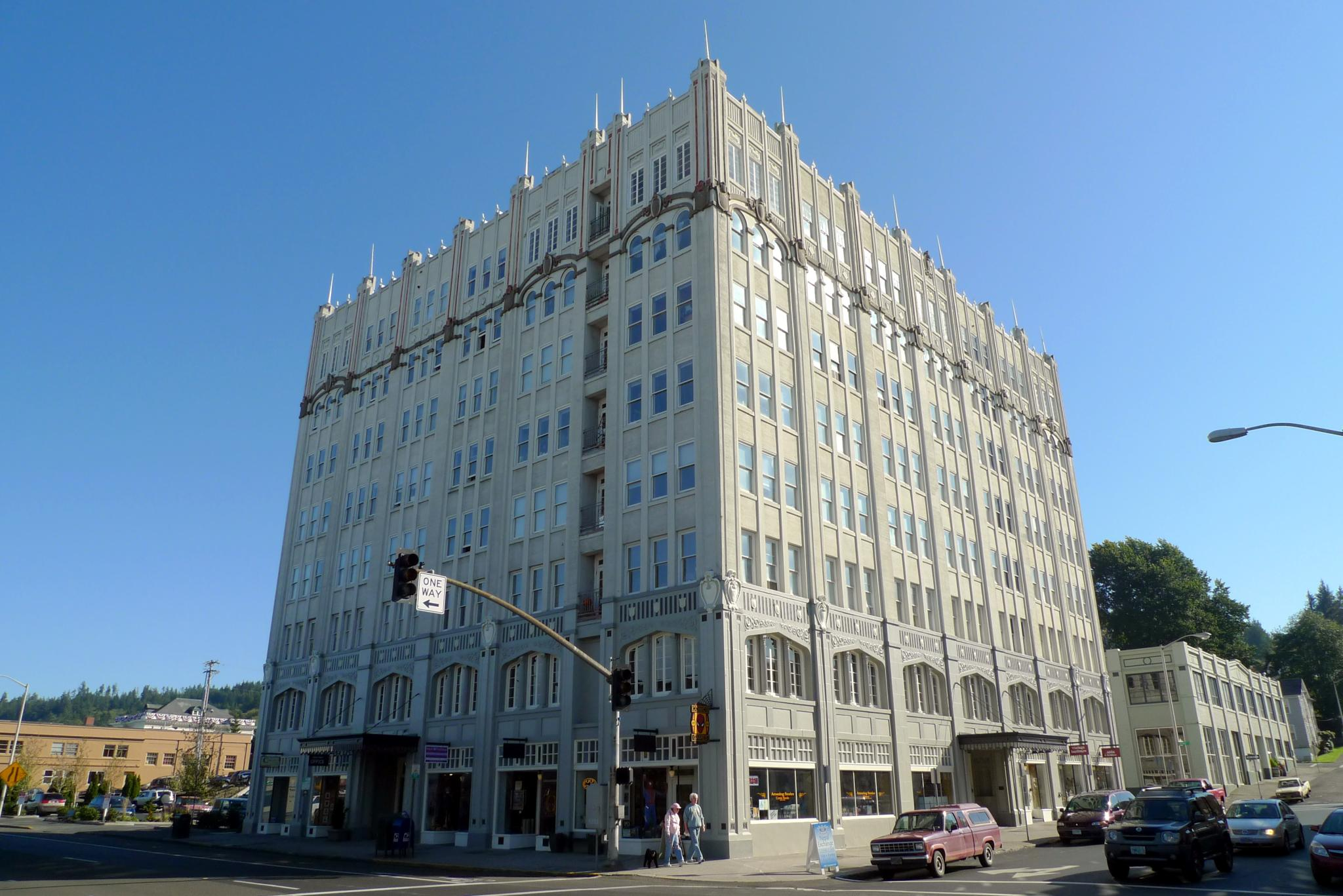
View from the northwest, showing the building's two widest sides

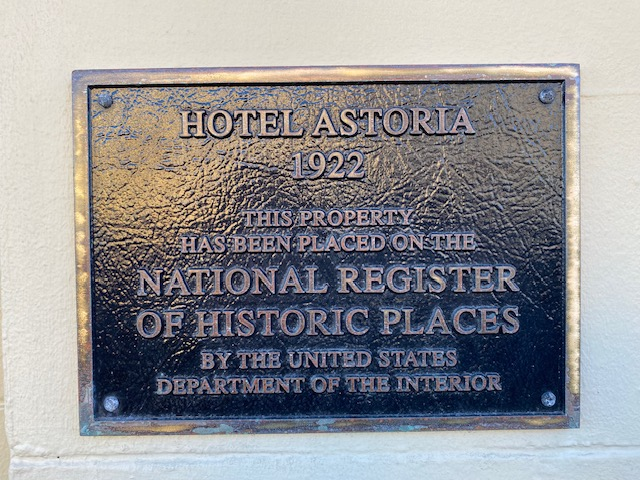

In its early years, the hotel was "the hub of the city's business dealings and social activities". In addition to 150 rooms for guests, the building included ten residential apartments on its top floor. The local chamber of commerce had its office in the hotel, and the basement included show space for salesmen. The hotel hosted many conventions, and several community groups used it as their regular meeting place. However, the hotel began to struggle financially within just a few years. It was beset with a variety of problems, involving "prohibition agents, liquor control officers, labor troubles and military police. The Army declared the area off-limits, and the Navy proclaimed it out-of-bounds," The Daily Astorian wrote in a 2011 retrospective article. The completion of the Sunset Highway in 1949 contributed to the decline in business, as it gave Portlanders a second route to the Oregon Coast, one not passing through Astoria. From the 1930s on, ownership of the hotel changed hands several times.

In late 1951, the Hotel Astoria was renamed the John Jacob Astor Hotel, in honor of the city's namesake, John Jacob Astor. The landmark building was repainted pink. However, a postwar decline in business continued, and other problems persisted. In 1961, the Astoria Fire Department found 51 code violations, six of them major, but all of the violations remained uncorrected seven years later. In early 1968 the Internal Revenue Service closed the restaurant and "Fur Trader Lounge" bar for failure to pay taxes.

=== Closure and long vacancy ===
In 1968, city officials condemned the building, declaring it a public nuisance and a fire hazard, and ordered it vacated. Except for a small Greyhound Lines terminal that was still operating in 1970, the building sat vacant for several years. A 1978 plan by the city to tear the building down was dropped when voters turned down a request for public funding to carry out the demolition. The Clatsop County government took ownership in 1978 through tax foreclosure and sold the building at auction in early 1979. During 1979, a group of local historians hoping to prevent further threat of demolition succeeded in an effort to get the landmark listed on the National Register of Historic Places. However, a succession of proposals to renovate and reopen the "derelict eyesore" failed to come to fruition. In 1983, a feature article about Astoria in The Sunday Oregonian referred to the Astor Hotel: "Formerly the pride of Astoria, the once-elegant inn now houses only frequent trespassers and serves as a haven for minor-in-possession juveniles with little to do on an Astoria Saturday night." Still wearing the pink paint, now faded, that it was given in the 1950s, the decaying building that still dominated the downtown skyline had come to be known as "the pink elephant" by local residents. At the end of an eight-year period as Astoria's mayor, Bob Chopping had given up hope of saving the hotel, telling a reporter in early 1983 that, "Citizens must have realized after all these years, chances of renovation is nil."

=== Conversion to apartments ===
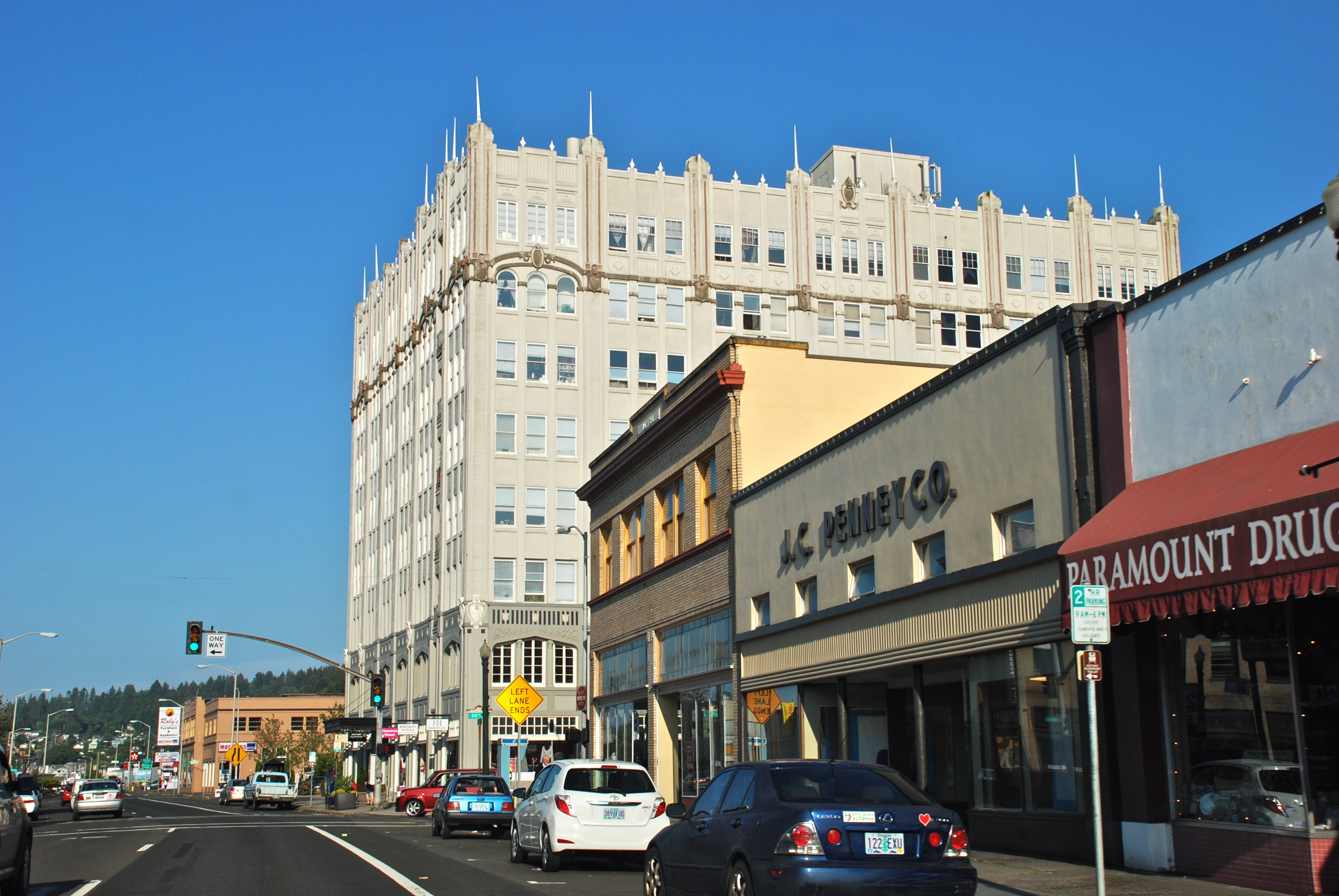
Looking east on downtown's main street. The Astor Hotel building is the city's tallest commercial structure.

In late 1984, a plan was approved in which private investors would convert the former hotel into 70 apartments for low-income residents on the six upper floors and commercial space on the first two floors. The building reopened in 1986 with 66 apartments of subsidized housing, referred to as the Astor Apartments and no longer colored pink. The lowermost two floors remained mostly vacant into the 1990s, but gradually businesses moved into the commercial spaces. The ornate lobby remained unused until 2010, when a business selling vintage furniture and hardware moved into the space.

As of 2026, the lobby was available as a venue for social functions, marketed as The Ruins At The Astor.

== Design ==
Exterior at the mezzanine level

The Hotel Astoria (later John Jacob Astor Hotel) was designed by architects Tourtellotte & Hummel, who were based in Portland from 1922 to 1930 and who, after the Astoria project, designed two other hotels that are now NRHP-listed: the Lithia Springs Hotel (Ashland, Oregon) and the Redwoods Hotel (Grants Pass, Oregon). Constructed of reinforced concrete, the eight-story John Jacob Astor Hotel building features Gothic decorative elements. The seventh floor is decorated with several escutcheons, one every third window, and the window groups at the building's corners at this level are additionally topped by rounded arches "embellished with elaborate cartouches in cast stone". Each group of three windows at the mezzanine level, or second floor, includes two Corinthian pilasters and is topped by a pointed arch and a frieze with three small shields above. The lobby is two stories high at its center and includes numerous Corinthian columns. It originally included a large fireplace and "an elegant wrought-iron chandelier with parchment shades over electric candles".

== Cable television birthplace ==
The former hotel has been called the "birthplace of cable television". In 1948, the Hotel Astoria was the site of the "world's first cable television system", invented by L. E. "Ed" Parsons, then owner of Astoria radio station KAST. Ed Parsons set up the first U.S. cable television system to use coaxial cable and a community antenna to deliver TV signals to an area that otherwise would not have been able to receive broadcast TV signals. The first television station in the Pacific Northwest was inaugurated in November 1948 by Seattle radio station KRSC, now KING-TV. Astoria being about 125 miles (201 km) from Seattle, Parsons "was unable to get a picture in his apartment, even with a high antenna". His apartment was located across the street from the eight-story Hotel Astoria, and with permission from the hotel's manager he set up an antenna on the building's roof and ran coaxial cable from there to his apartment. The set-up worked, and Parsons and his wife were the only people in Astoria able to view television, starting on Thanksgiving Day 1948. "Reception was not of a quality that would be saleable today," Parsons told The Oregonian in 1972, "but we received a picture and started attracting guests." The couple quickly became overwhelmed by requests from friends and neighbors eager to pay them a visit to experience the new medium. To appease them, Parsons laid a second cable to a TV set in the hotel's lobby, and by the end of December a nearby music store was the third hook-up. Parsons then began setting up cable television connections to area households, with 25 receiving the service by mid-March 1949 and 100 by July. Some time later, Parsons moved his community antenna from the roof of the Hotel Astoria to a separate location elsewhere in town and also added a second antenna site.

== See also ==
- National Register of Historic Places listings in Clatsop County, Oregon
