= Corbett School =

Public school in Corbett, Oregon, United States

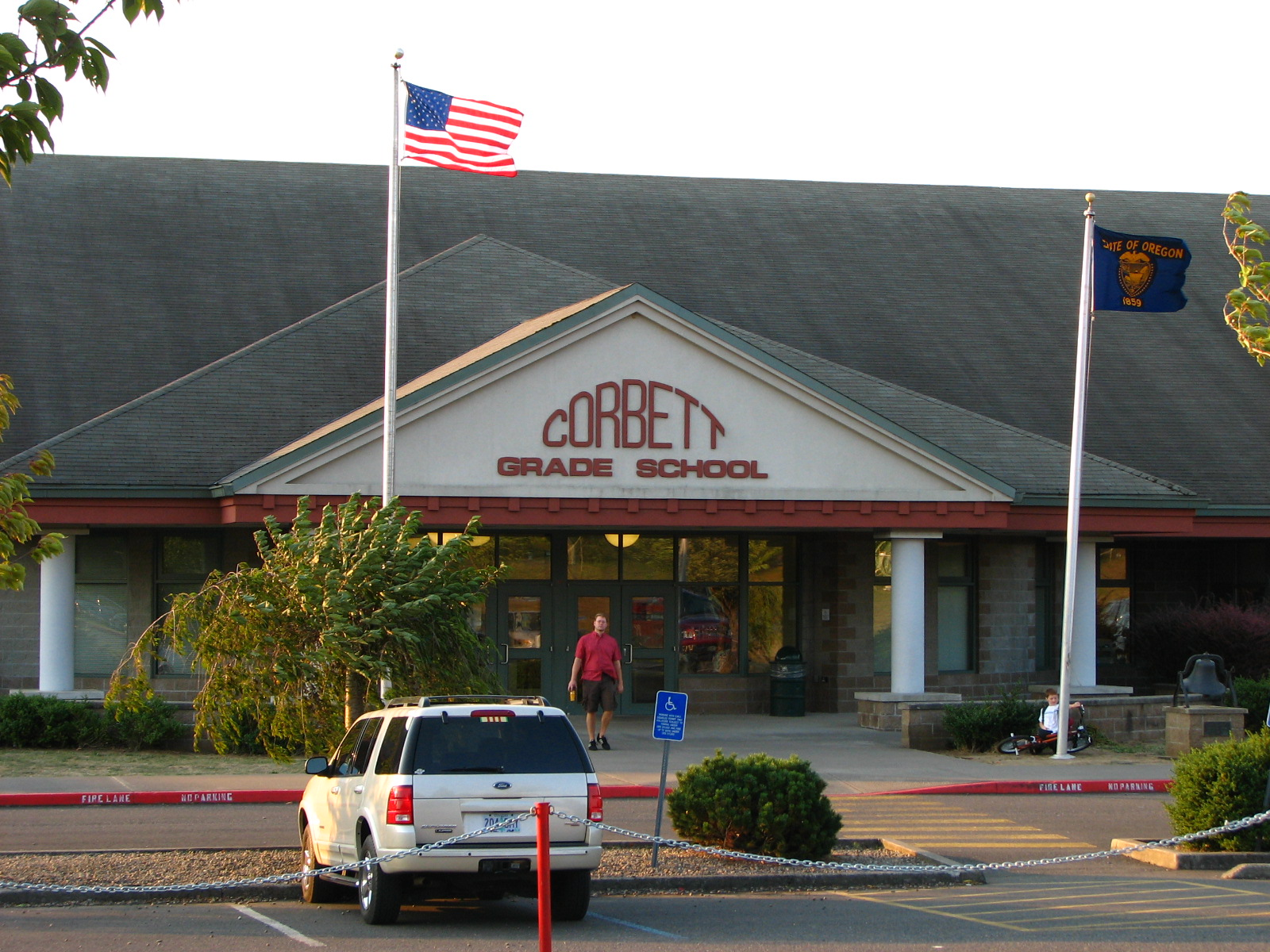

Location
- 35800 E Historic Columbia River Highway; Corbett, Multnomah County, Oregon 97109; United States; 45.530504°N 122.294703°W

Information
- Type: Public School
- School district: Corbett School District
- Principal: Derek Fialkiewicz (superintendent)
- Grades: K-12
- Enrollment: 600
- Colors: Red and Black
- Athletics conference: OSAA Tri-Valley Conference 4A-2
- Mascot: Cardinals
- Team name: Cardinals
- Website: corbett.k12.or.us

Corbett School is a K-12 public school in Corbett, Oregon, United States. In 2010, Corbett School was ranked 5th among public schools in the United States by Newsweek, as measured by the proportion of students who passed college prep courses. In 2011, it was ranked 15th by The Washington Post.

== Academics ==
In 2008, 90% of the school's seniors received their high school diploma. Of 41 students, 37 graduated, 2 dropped out, 1 part-time home school student and 1 received a modified diploma.

As of 2026, the school is ranked at 1,043 nationally with a 95% graduation rate.

== District Campuses and Locations ==
In December, 2023 the district opened a new 7th grade to 8th grade campus at 31520 East Woodard Road, and as of fall 2026, there are currently 3 campus locations. CAPS (Corbett Arts Program with Spanish) which is a K-8 campus, at 32405 East Historic Columbia River Highway, "Woodard" which is a 7-8 campus, at 31520 East Woodard Road, and "Main Campus" which is a K-12 campus (Formerly included a Pre-K program), at 35800 East Historic Columbia River Highway.
