= Springdale School =

Coordinates: 45.51935°N 122.32968°W

- U.S. National Register of Historic Places
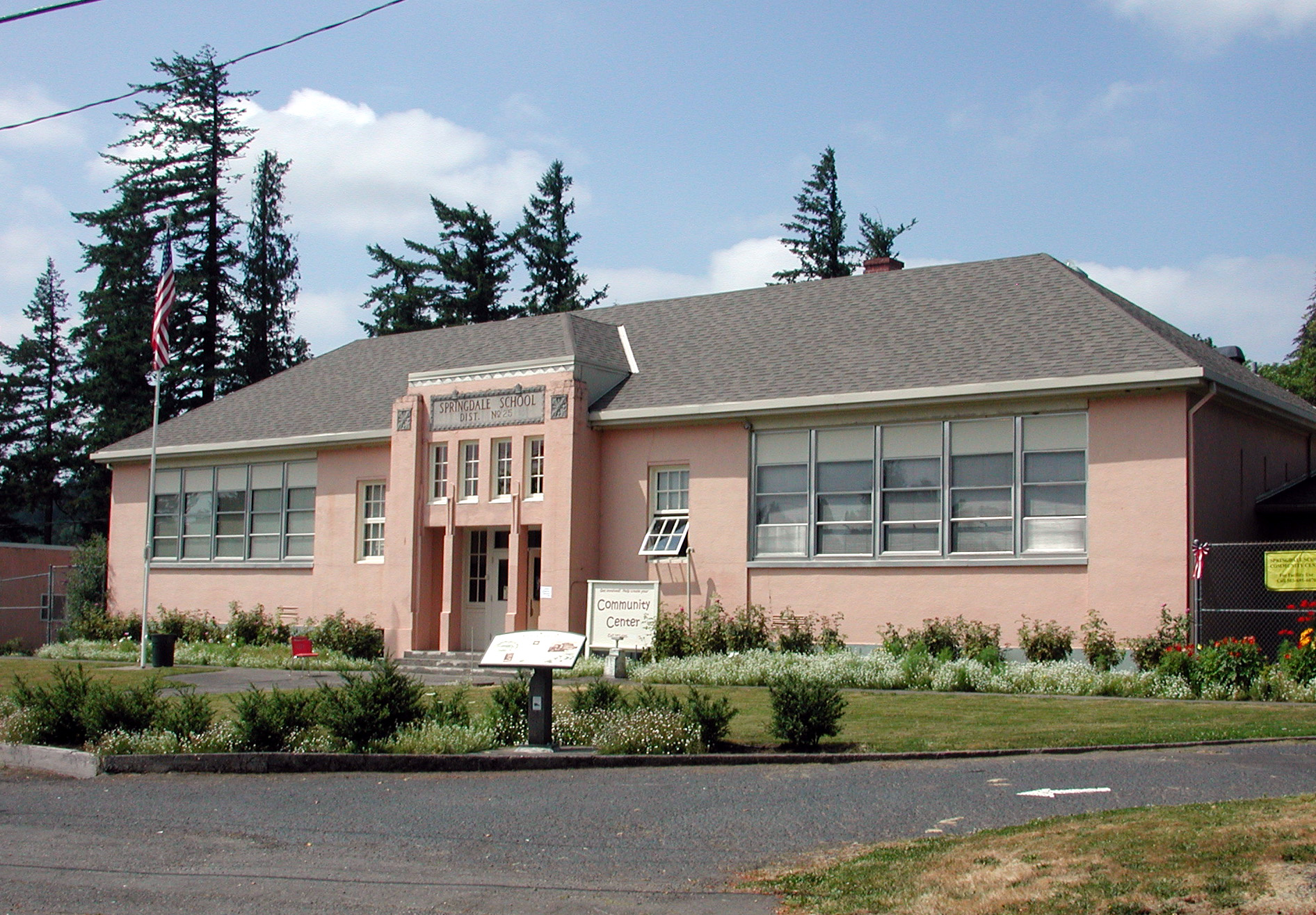
- Springdale Community Center in 2009
- Interactive map of Springdale School
- Location: 32405 E Historic Columbia River Hwy; Springdale, Oregon, United States
- Built: 1931
- Built by: Claude Woodle
- Architect: Claud Freeman
- Architectural style: Art Deco
- NRHP reference No.: 11000771
- Added to NRHP: October 25, 2011

The Springdale School, now the Springdale Community Center, is a building located in Springdale, Oregon, United States on the National Register of Historic Places. The single-story, Art Deco-style building was designed by Claud Freeman and constructed in 1931 by Claude Woodle.

== History ==
Springdale School at the intersection of the historic highway and Bell Road also served as the Springdale Community Center. The first school building at the site was built in 1899, the second about 20 years later, and the third in 1931. Voters approved consolidation of the Springdale and Corbett school districts in 1960, and in 1996 the Corbett School District (CSD) stopped using the Springdale building as a school. Tenants who began renting space in the building from CSD eventually formed the Springdale School Community Association (SSCA), which was granted 501(c)(3) nonprofit status in 2006.

SSCA's stated mission is "to preserve and enhance the Springdale School property in cooperation with the Corbett School District and facilitate its use for cultural, educational and social opportunities for a broad spectrum of the Springdale/Corbett Community". In February 2009, the CSD board voted unanimously to accept an offer from SSCA to buy the property for $312,000 at a closing set for May 2011. Until then, the center will continue under terms of a memorandum of understanding between CSD and SSCA.

== See also ==
- National Register of Historic Places listings in Multnomah County, Oregon
