= Regent Apartments =

Historic building in Portland, Oregon, U.S.

- U.S. National Register of Historic Places
- U.S. Historic district – Contributing property
- Portland Historic Landmark
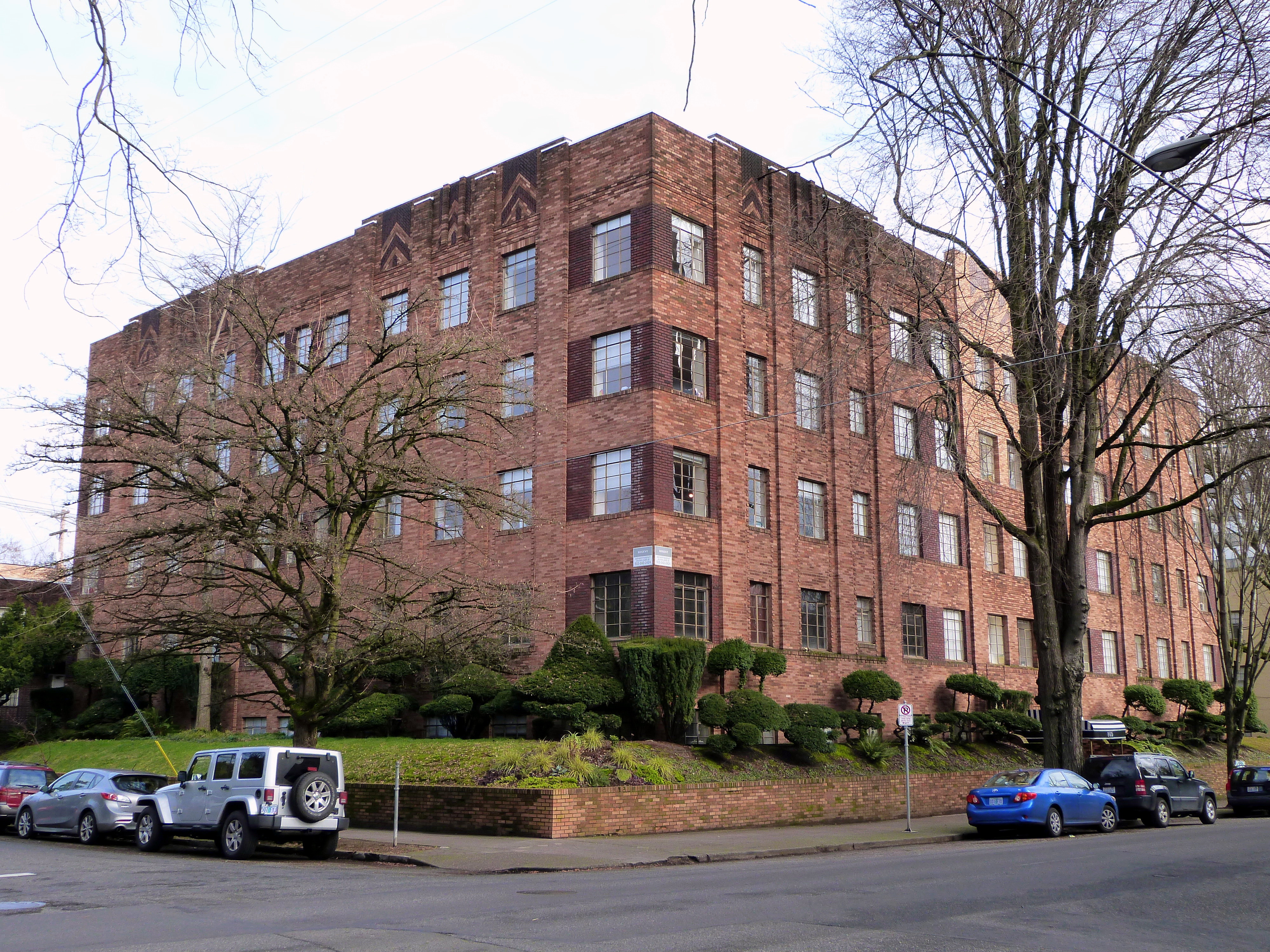
- The building's exterior in 2013

- Location within Portland, Oregon Location within Oregon Location within the United States
- Location: 1975 NW Everett Street; Portland, Oregon
- Coordinates: 45°31′30″N 122°41′31″W
- Built: 1937
- Architect: Henry Albert Herzog
- Architectural style: Moderne, Art Deco
- Part of: Alphabet Historic District (ID00001293)
- NRHP reference No.: 91000044
- Added to NRHP: February 20, 1991

The Regent Apartments, located in northwest Portland, Oregon, are listed on the National Register of Historic Places.

== See also ==
- National Register of Historic Places listings in Northwest Portland, Oregon
