= Charles F. Berg Building =

Historic building in Portland, Oregon, U.S.

- U.S. National Register of Historic Places
- Portland Historic Landmark
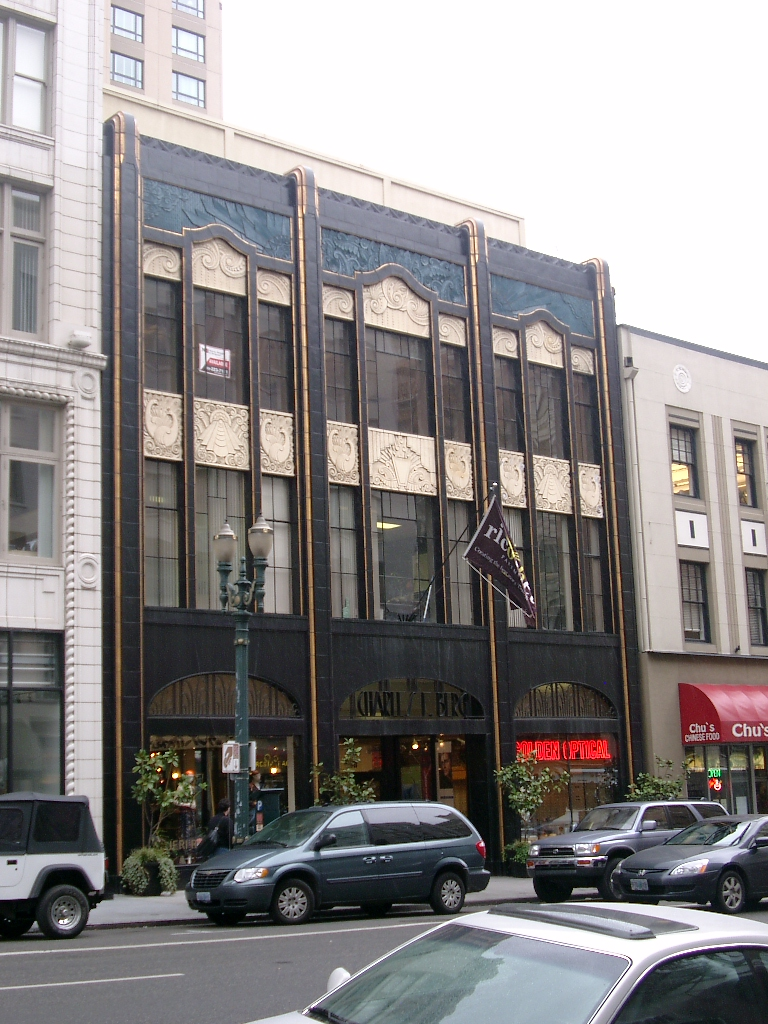
- Charles F. Berg Building facade on SW Broadway.

- Location within Portland, Oregon
- Location: 615 SW Broadway; Portland, Oregon
- Coordinates: 45°31′11″N 122°40′47″W
- Built: 1902/renovated 1930
- Architect: Grand Rapids Store Equipment Company
- Architectural style: Moderne
- NRHP reference No.: 83002170
- Added to NRHP: September 1, 1983

The Charles F. Berg Building, also the Dolph Building is an art-deco building in downtown Portland, Oregon. It is one of the few examples of commercial use of art-deco in Portland.

The structure was built in 1902, and remodeled into a women's clothing store with its signature facade in 1930. Charles F. Berg (1871–1932), the building's namesake, was the owner of the store once located inside. At the time, Charles F. Berg was an upscale store, and featured ornate and lavish interior fixtures such as a Tiffany-designed elevator. The facade includes inlays of 14 Karat gold.

Currently, the building is used as offices, with a retail arcade on the ground floor. The Berg building was added to the National Register of Historic Places in 1983.

== See also ==
- Architecture of Portland, Oregon
- National Register of Historic Places listings in Southwest Portland, Oregon
