= Schaefers Building =

- U.S. National Register of Historic Places
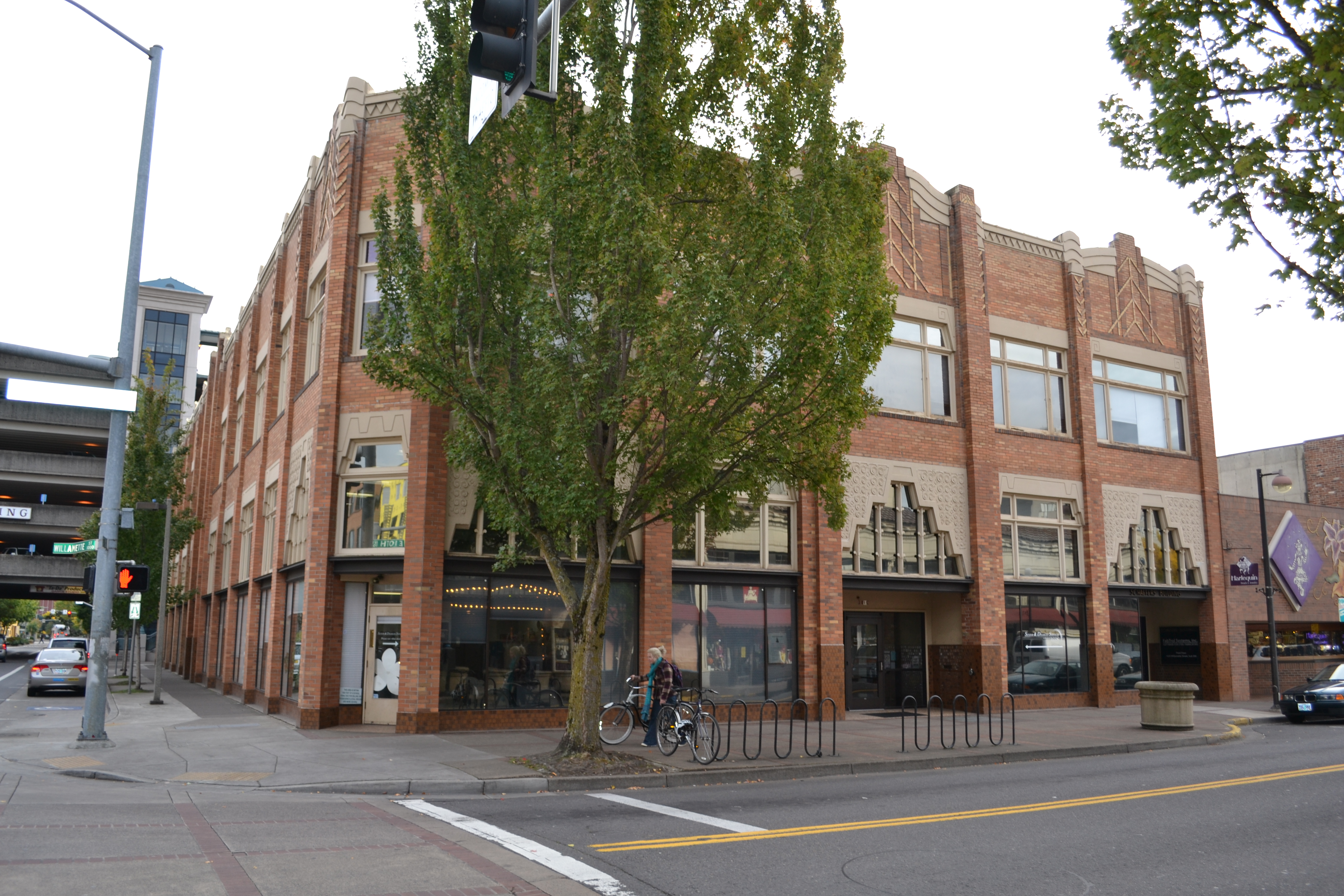
- The building in 2011

- Location within Oregon
- Location: 1001 Willamette St., Eugene, Oregon
- Coordinates: 44°02′55″N 123°05′32″W
- Area: less than one acre
- Built: 1929
- Architect: Truman Phillips
- Architectural style: Art Deco, Modernistic
- NRHP reference No.: 79003735
- Added to NRHP: October 30, 1979

The Schaefers Building, located in Eugene, Oregon, is listed on the National Register of Historic Places. It was designed in 1929 by Truman Phillips.

== See also ==
- National Register of Historic Places listings in Lane County, Oregon
