= Canterbury Castle (Portland, Oregon) =

Former house in Portland, Oregon, U.S.

- Formerly listed on the U.S. National Register of Historic Places
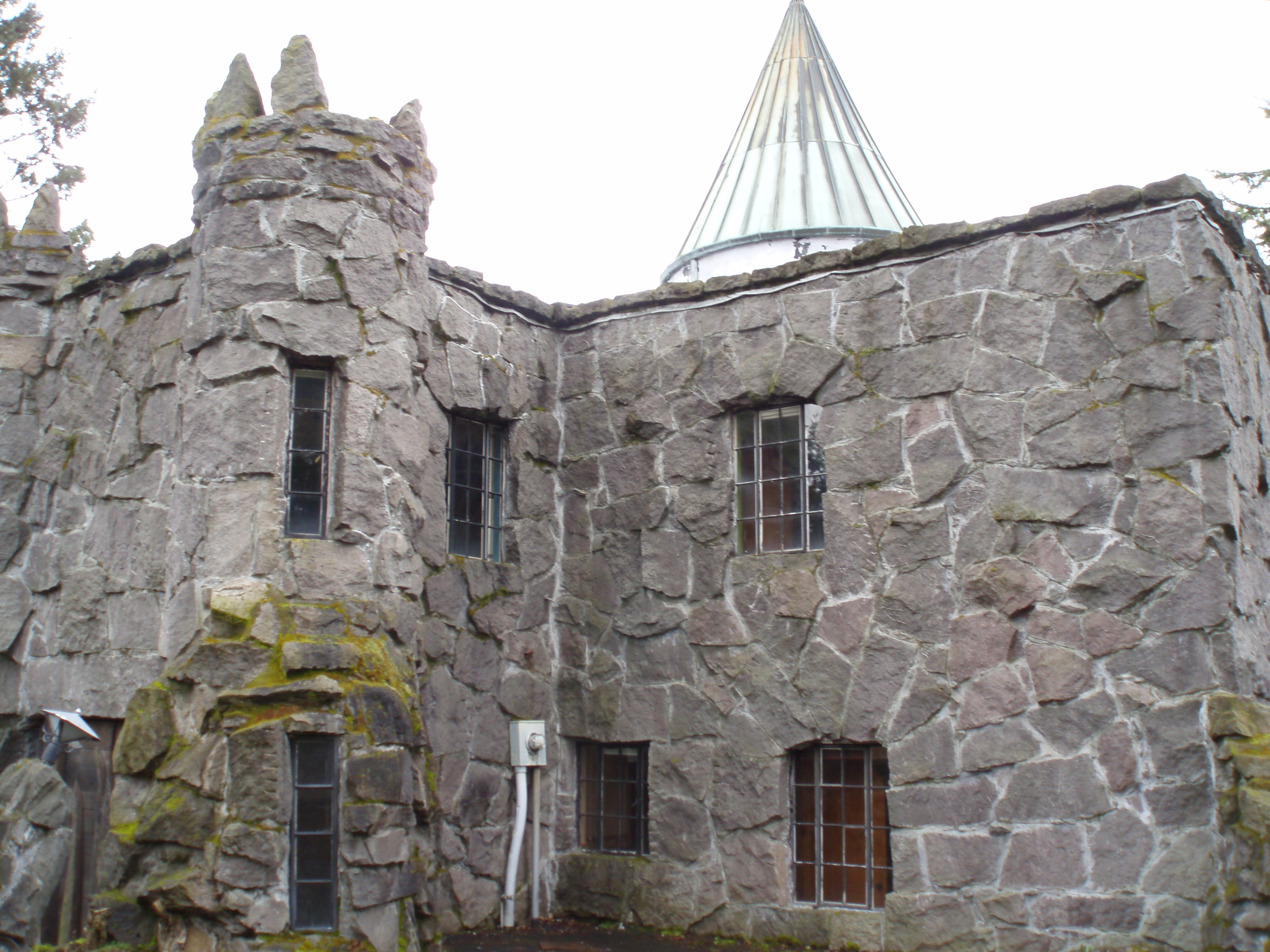
- The house's exterior in 2009, prior to demolition

- Location within Portland, Oregon Location within Oregon Location within the United States
- Location: 2910 Southwest Canterbury Lane; Portland, Oregon
- Coordinates: 45°31′18″N 122°42′32″W
- Area: less than one acre
- Built: 1929–1931
- Architect: Jeter O. Frye
- Architectural style: Castellated style
- Demolished: 2009
- NRHP reference No.: 87001509

Significant dates
- Added to NRHP: September 8, 1987
- Removed from NRHP: October 13, 2010

Canterbury Castle, also known as Arlington Castle, was a private house located in southwest Portland, Oregon and listed on the National Register of Historic Places. Constructed during 1929–1931, the house was designed by Jeter O. Frye to resemble England's Canterbury Castle on the exterior and to evoke the Art Deco styling of Hollywood of the 1920s on the interior. The house included castle features such as a moat, drawbridge and turret and attracted paying tourists immediately following its completion.

Canterbury Castle, Portland's only castle structure built in the 1930s, was added to the National Register of Historic Places in 1987. The property was also designated as a Portland Historic Landmark. The house underwent major renovation efforts in the 2000s, but those efforts were not completed, and the house was demolished in 2009 after failing to meet municipal safety codes. The razing of Canterbury made Piggott's Castle the city's only remaining castle. Canterbury Castle was removed from the National Register of Historic Places in October 2010.

== Description ==
Canterbury Castle was a private 6,000-square-foot (560 m^{2}), three-story house located in Arlington Heights near Washington Park, offering views of downtown Portland. Constructed from basalt stone quarried from Rocky Butte, the house featured characteristics of a castle such as a moat, a drawbridge and a copper-topped turret. The wooden drawbridge covered a moat seven feet wide by more than three feet deep. A single-car garage, built into the hillside, was constructed during the same time as the house. The concrete foundation supported a rectangular ground plan. Canterbury featured "buttressing wing walls, cylindrical corner bays and a crenellated parapet of uncut stone". Round, arched and straight-topped frameless windows were often fitted with steel sashes. Doorways were also frameless, narrow and round or parabolic in shape. Doors had wrought iron hinges, handles and lock plates. The leaded glass slit window at the stair tower's top level featured a spiderweb pattern, a signature element of castle designer Jeter O. Frye's work. Windmill palms surrounding the property added to its exotic appearance.

The Art Deco-style interior, meant to evoke a 1920s Hollywood style, featured mahogany woodwork, tile floors and chandeliers. The inside also contained Spanish-style white stucco, spiral staircases and wrought iron features including stair rails, built-in cabinetry door and window hardware and lighting fixtures. The house included a basement pool (which eventually closed due to water leaks), a stone fireplace 10 feet (3.0 m) in width, and small square windows. Also in the basement were the furnace, a storage room, and spaces for laundry and billiards. The main floor housed the garage, a kitchen and breakfast bay, the living and dining rooms and a music room. The master bedroom was adjacent to a deck above the dining and music rooms at the southwest corner of the property. Fireplaces and hallway floors featured brown ceramic tile; black glazed ceramic tile was used in the master bathroom, while black, red and yellow tiles were used in the breakfast bay. One of the castle's bathrooms was said to be modeled on Charlie Chaplin's. The interior was arranged around a central stair tower capped with a conical roof clad in copper. Chimneys vented the centrally located furnace and rose from fireplaces in the house's west hall.

== History ==
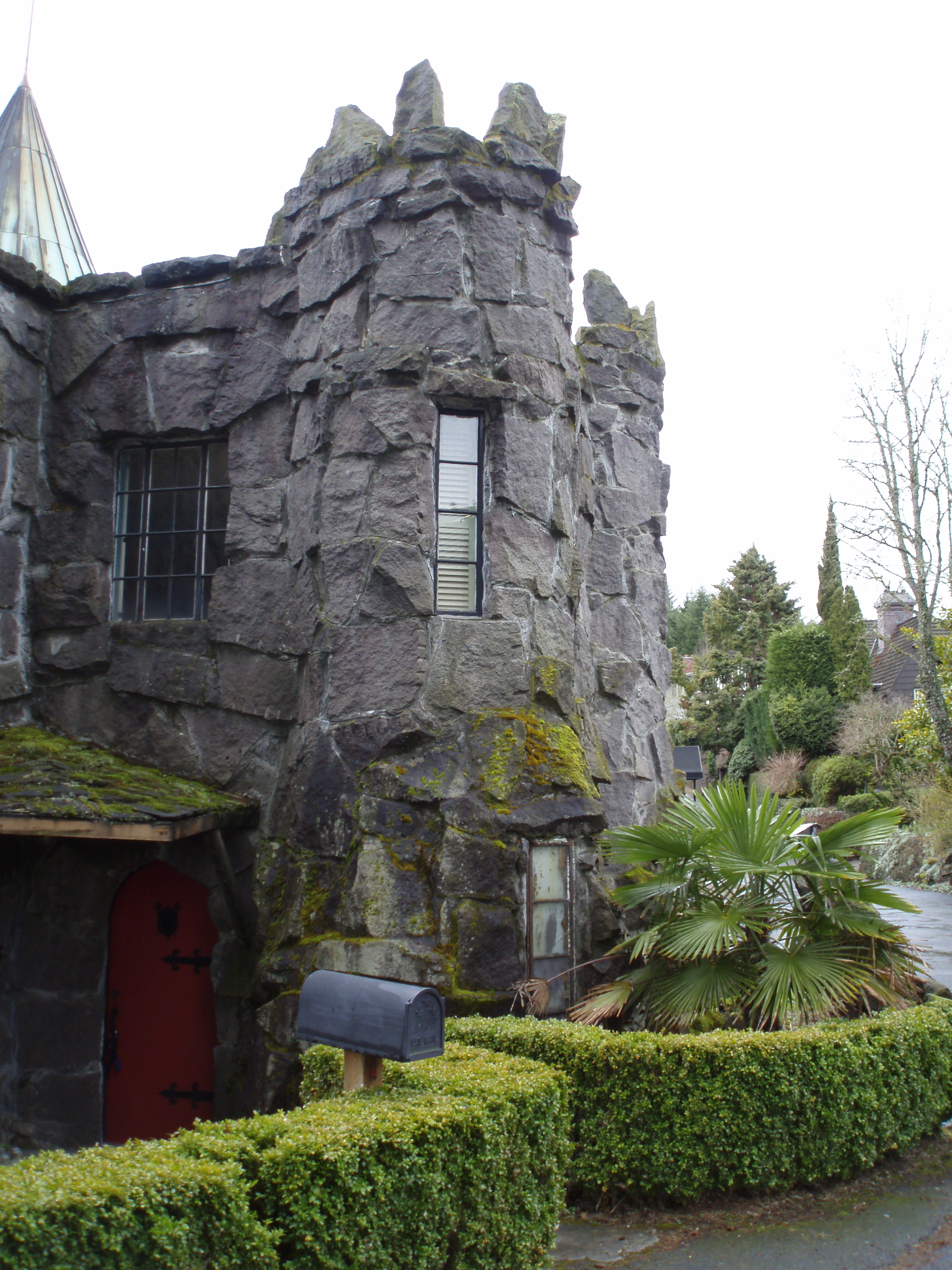
The house's exterior, 2009

Canterbury Castle was designed by Jeter O. Frye and constructed between 1929 and 1931. Immediately following construction, Frye was unable to sell the house and left Portland in bankruptcy to resume his career in California. Visitors immediately showed interest in touring the house. The castle attracted paying tourists and school groups, became a stop on the Washington Park bus tour and hosted Halloween parties for a local radio station. The house became known as Canterbury Castle over time due to the plat and name of the street on which it was situated. The terraced garden was eliminated in the 1950s when a portion of the land was sold. The property was added to the National Register of Historic Places in 1987 under the ownership of Dale and Karen Bernards, who had submitted an application for listing one year prior.

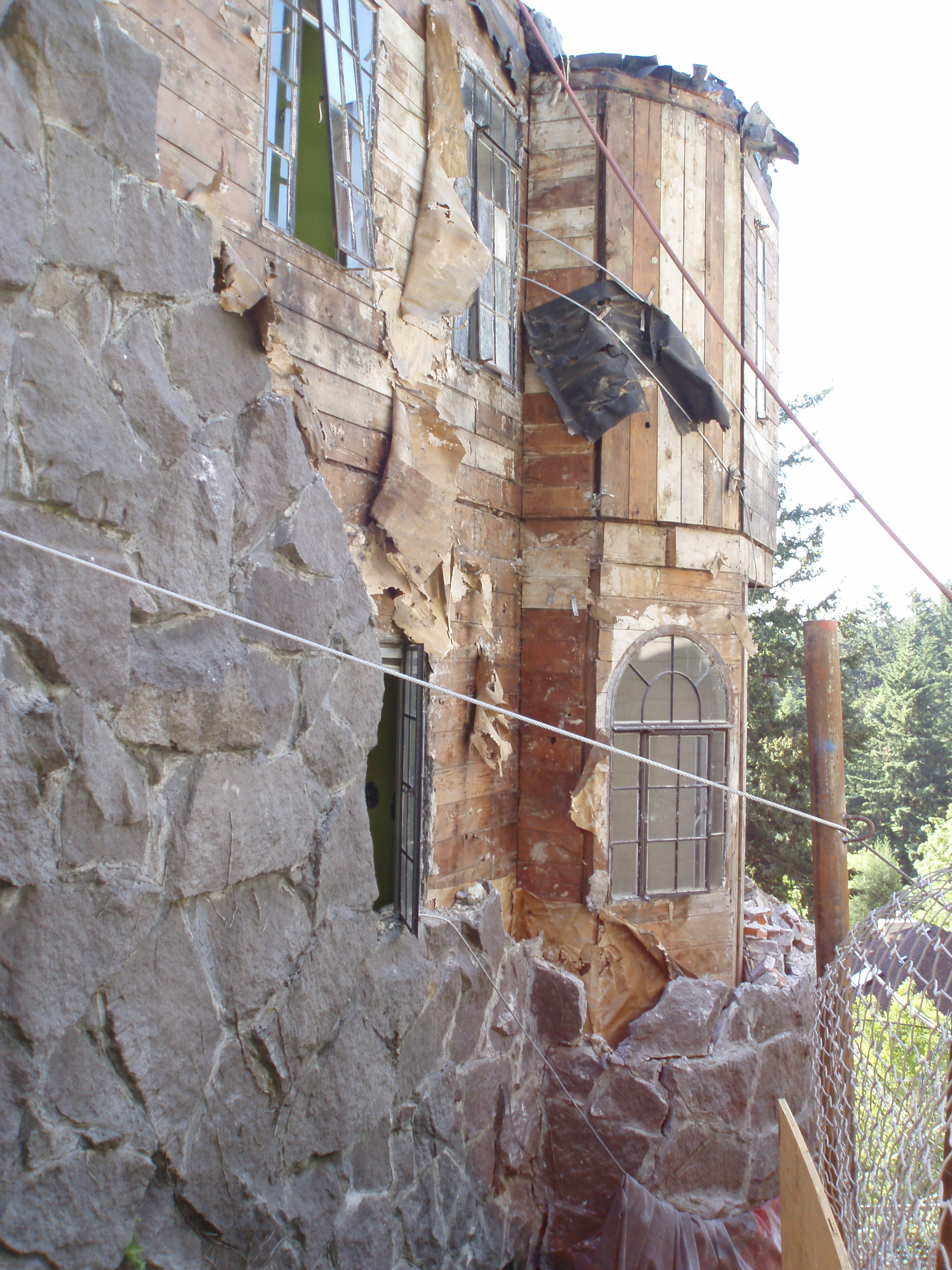
Canterbury Castle during demolition in 2009

Sidney Lynne and John Hefferin purchased the house for $469,900 in 2004 after it had been unoccupied for more than a year. By then, the structure had developed leaks and displayed cracks along the foundation, walls and ceiling. In 2006, a falling tree caused stones to break away, damaging the house's main gas line. The couple spent $200,000 over four years to reinforce the walls. Lynne and Hefferin also constructed exterior stairs and an underground retaining wall. However, the renovation process was not completed, as they were unable to pay for all repairs required by the city, which had issued $20,000 in fines on the property. The couple also struggled to pay for costly landslide prevention efforts, rising property taxes and high heating bills. Canterbury Castle was listed for sale in the summer of 2008 for $2 million. Lynne invited local interior design students and contractors to upgrade the house's interior, without success. The couple left the house in January 2009, and ownership was turned over to JPMorgan Chase. Lynne began a "one-woman crusade" to save the castle, seeking assistance from Portland City Commissioner Randy Leonard and from home improvement expert and This Old House host Bob Vila. In February 2009, the city's bureau of development services found that unstable soil and the risk of stones separating from sheeting underneath posed a landslide risk. The property had missing stones and thick cracks several feet long, which presented hazards to residents and the street below. Rumors of demolition began to surface in March 2009.

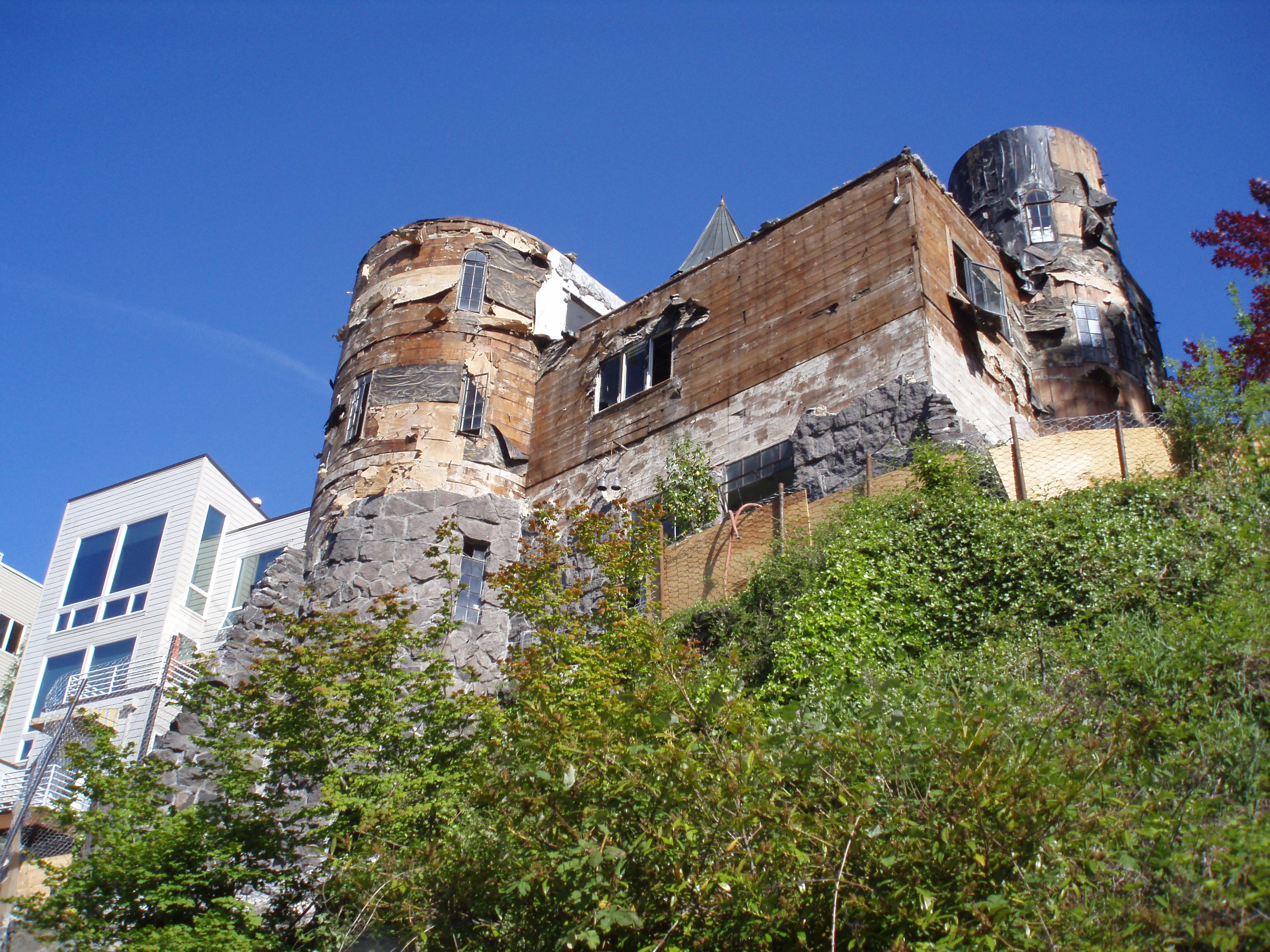
The house being demolished, 2009

In April 2009, the house was purchased by Robert Stansel, who had lived next door to the house for several years, at a foreclosure auction for $280,000. Demolition began in May 2009; the house was considered "structurally unsound" by the local government, a determination that permitted demolition despite the house's listing on the National Register of Historic Places. Lynne said of the house and its demolition: "It's totally like a death and completely unnecessary. It's a magical property that invokes hope and imagination in people. We had a really great time with it." Residents shared mixed feelings about the demolition. Stansel was able to salvage 21 tiles with neo-Aztec designs. In 2009, The Oregonian reported that Stansel would wait until the economy and housing market improved before deciding whether to sell the land or build a new structure.

Canterbury Castle was removed from the National Register of Historic Places on October 13, 2010. The demolition of Canterbury Castle made Piggott's Castle in southwest Portland the last remaining castle in the city. The property had also been listed as a Portland Historic Landmark and was the city's only castle structure constructed in the 1930s. Two stones from Canterbury Castle serve as steps in the zen garden of Stansel's home in East Hampton, New York.

== See also ==
- Architecture of Portland, Oregon
- List of castles in the United States
- National Register of Historic Places listings in Southwest Portland, Oregon
