= United States Post Office (Eugene, Oregon) =

- U.S. Post Office
- U.S. National Register of Historic Places
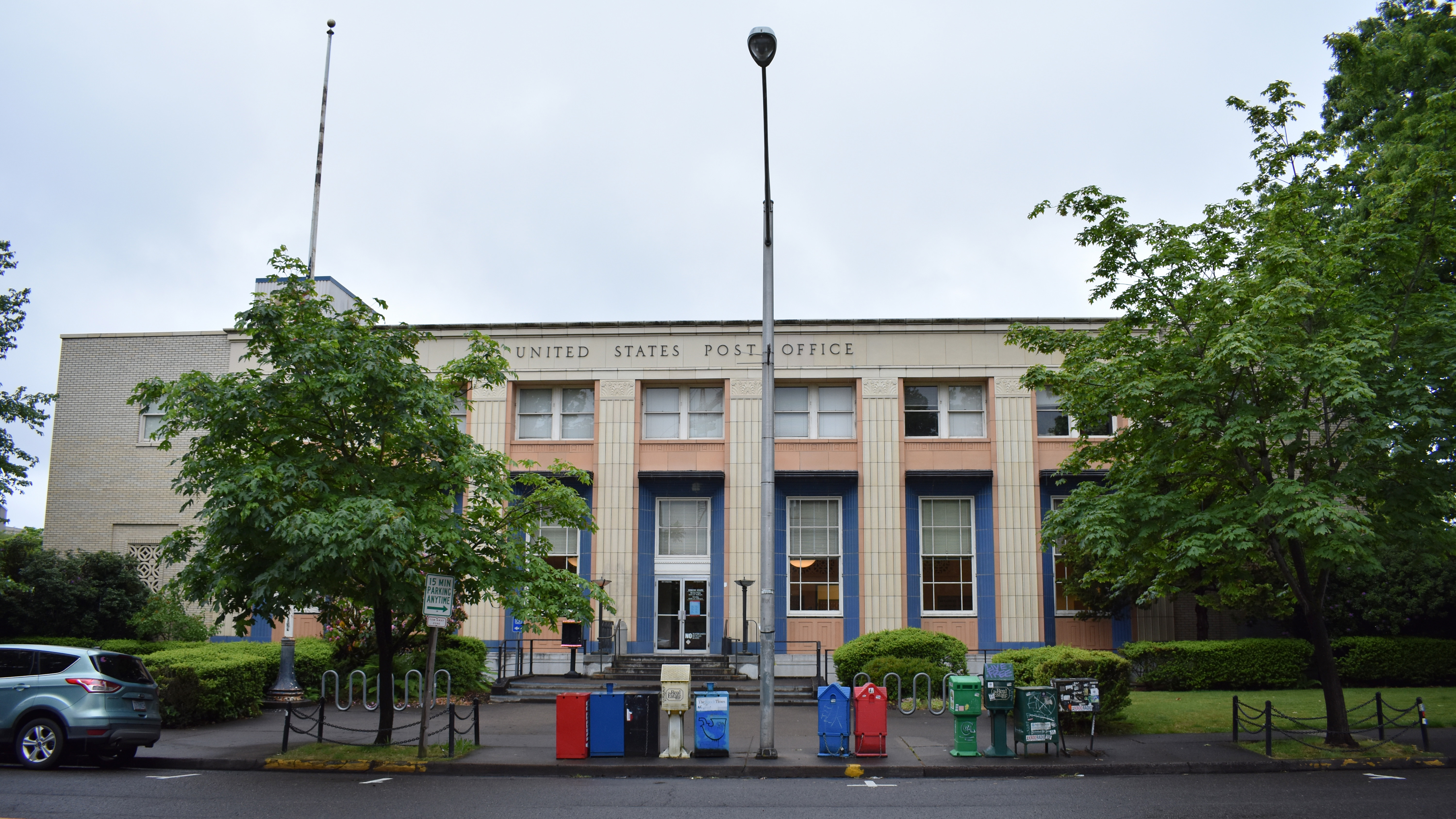
- The U.S. Post Office in 2019

- Location within Oregon Location within the United States
- Interactive map showing the location of U.S. Post Office, Eugene, Oregon
- Location: 520 Willamette Street, Eugene, Oregon
- Coordinates: 44°03′14″N 123°05′35″W
- Area: 0.7 acres (0.28 ha)
- Built: 1939
- Architect: Gilbert S. Underwood
- Architectural style: Art Deco
- MPS: Significant US Post Offices in Oregon 1900-1941 TR
- NRHP reference No.: 85001805
- Added to NRHP: August 14, 1985

The main United States Post Office in Eugene, Oregon, is a 2-story Art Deco building designed by Gilbert Stanley Underwood and constructed in 1939. The front facade features blue and cream colored terracotta with black and buff colored accents, and pilasters separate multicolored window bays. The building is the only example of federal Art Deco architecture in Lane County, and it is the only federal building in Oregon to use multicolored terracotta. Murals painted by Carl Morris were installed in the lobby in 1943. The post office was added to the National Register of Historic Places in 1985. The corner at 5th and Willamette Streets contains three sites listed on the register.

== See also ==
- Lane Hotel, NRHP
- Eugene–Springfield station, NRHP
