= Redwoods Hotel =

- U.S. National Register of Historic Places
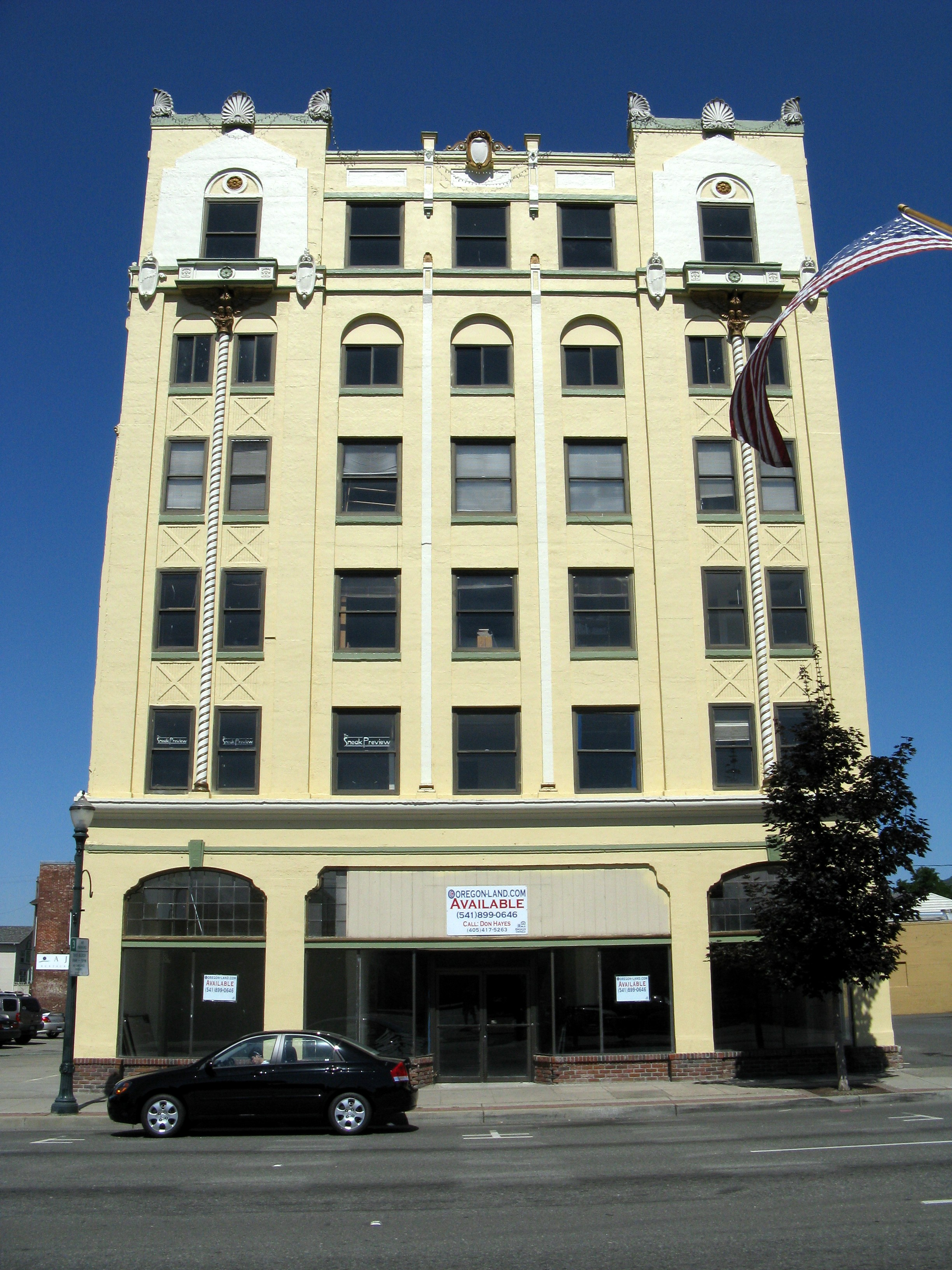
- The Redwoods Hotel in 2009. The old Josephine Hotel was to its left.

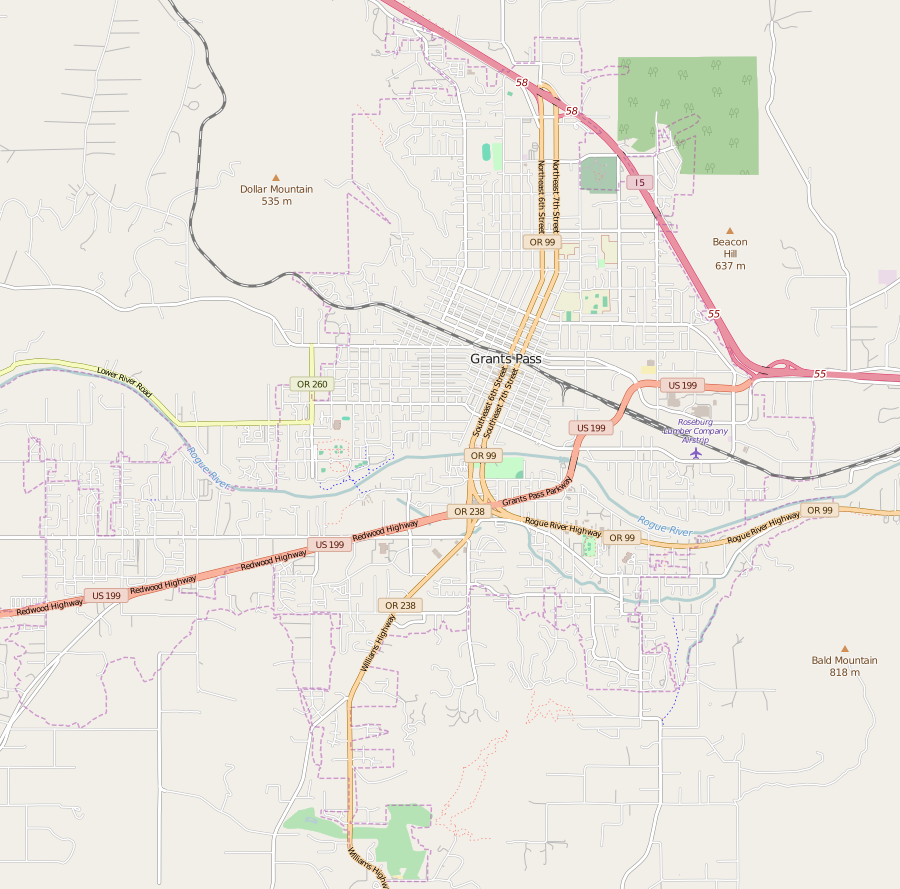
- Location within Grants Pass OR
- Location: 310 NW 6th St, Grants Pass, Oregon
- Coordinates: 42°26′28″N 123°19′31″W
- Area: less than one acre
- Built: 1926
- Built by: R.I. Stuart
- Architect: Tourtellotte and Hummel
- NRHP reference No.: 79002079
- Added to NRHP: October 25, 1979

The Redwoods Hotel, also known as the Redwood Towers, is a historic six-story hotel building located at 306-310 Northwest 6th Street in Grants Pass, Josephine County, Oregon. Built in 1926 of reinforced concrete with cast concrete art deco ornamentation on its front facade, it was designed by the architectural firm of Tourtellotte and Hummel, noted for the many buildings it designed in Idaho and Oregon. Its builder was R.I. (Richard Irwin) Stuart, of Medford, Oregon, who completed it in 6 months. It was built as an expansion of the adjacent 3-story brick Josephine Hotel and originally contained 45 hotel rooms with retail space on its first floor. The old Josephine Hotel was completely gutted by fire in 1975 and was razed. After the fire, the owners of the Redwoods Hotel made the decision to convert its upper floors to office space.

On October 25, 1979, it was added to the National Register of Historic Places.
