= Corbett, Oregon =

Unincorporated community in Oregon, United States

- Unincorporated community
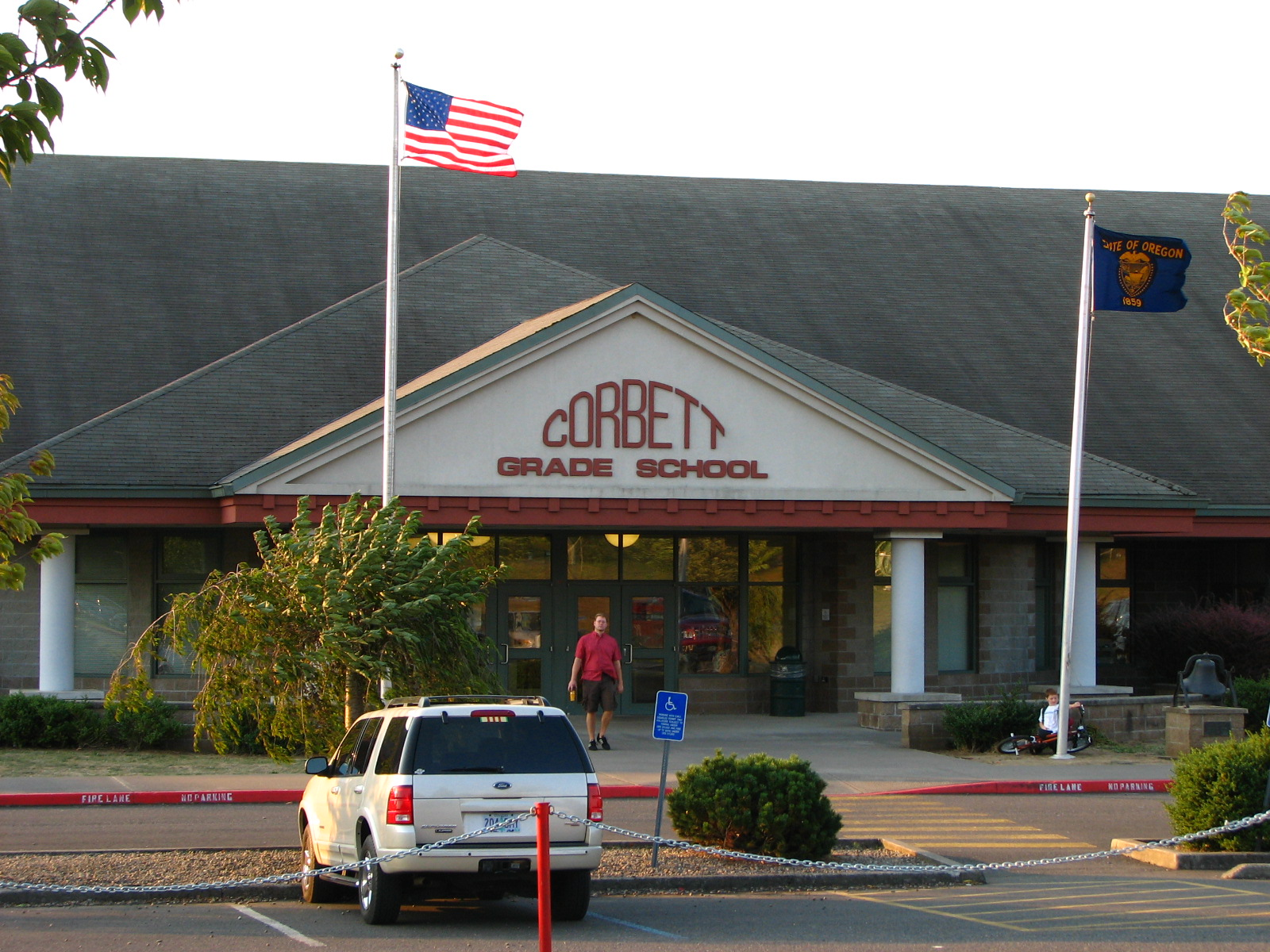
- The flags at Corbett Grade School demonstrate Corbett's signature east wind.

- Location within Oregon Location within the United States
- Coordinates: 45°31′54″N 122°17′28″W
- Country: United States
- State: Oregon
- County: Multnomah
- Elevation: 669 ft (204 m)

Population (2020)
  - Total: 3,947
- Time zone: UTC-8 (Pacific (PST))
  - Summer (DST): UTC-7 (PDT)
- ZIP codes: 97019
- GNIS feature ID: 1136174

Corbett is an unincorporated town on the Columbia River in eastern Multnomah County, Oregon, United States. It is located on the Historic Columbia River Highway (a.k.a. Crown Point Highway) between the Sandy River and Crown Point. It is located east of Portland on Interstate 84.

Corbett was named for prominent Oregon pioneer Senator Henry W. Corbett. Senator Corbett purchased a farm,The Highlands, in the area in 1885 that he used as a summer retreat, high up on the Columbia River Gorge on the bluff with a panoramic view overlooking the river. A little over ninety years before, in 1792, the river below had first been seen by a white man when it was charted by one of Captain George Vancouver's ships. Ten years later, this bluff had first been gazed upon by the first Americans to come overland to the West when Lewis and Clark passed by on the river below. And around 1812 David Thompson had been the first to map its wilderness for the Hudson's Bay Company. Henry Corbett's farm gave the name to the town of Corbett, later established nearby. The farm was reached by one of Corbett's rail cars of the Oregon Railway and Navigation Company (OR&N) of which he was the major stockholder. The OR&N track had been completed along the gorge by 1882. This was over 30 years before the Highway had been built between along it between 1913 and 1922.

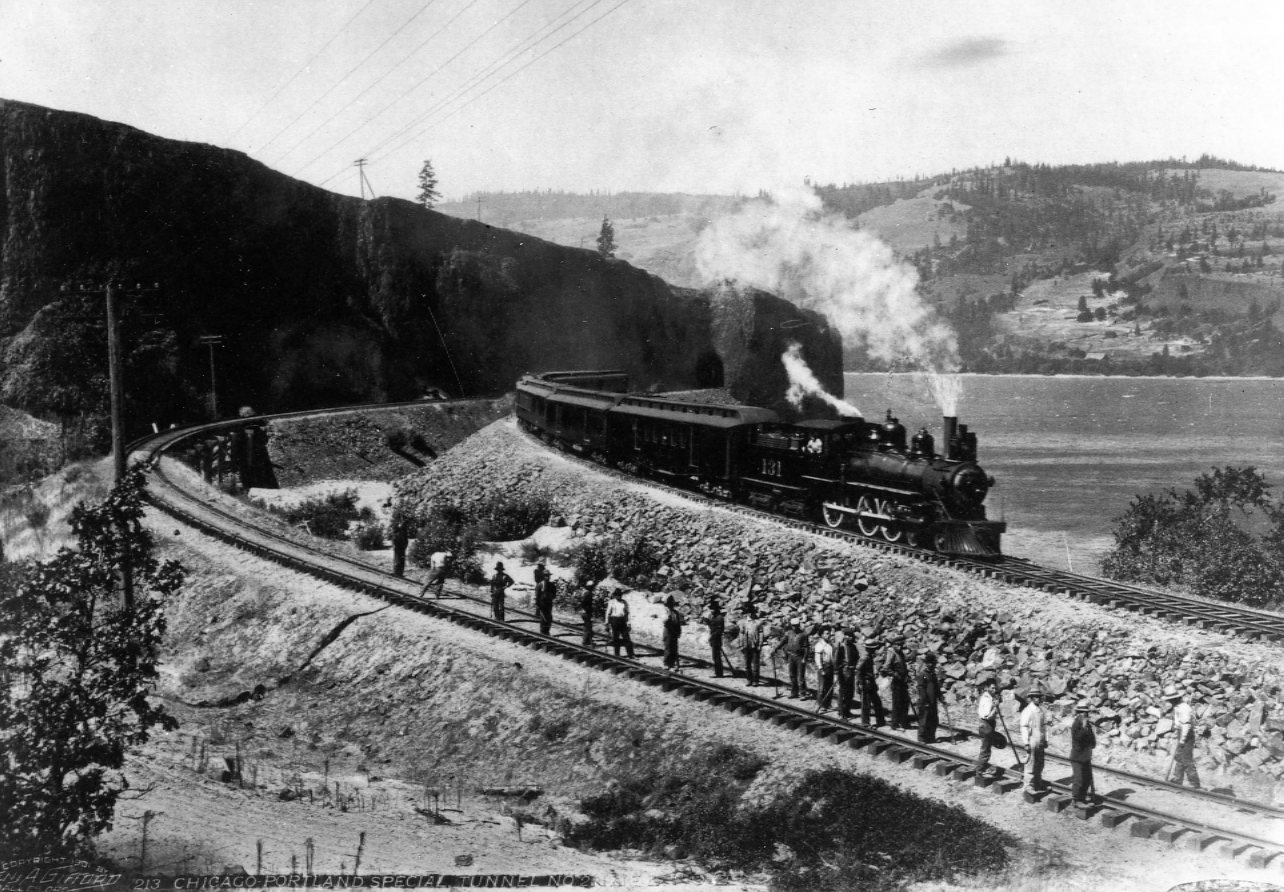
OR&N track being twinned along the Columbia River Gorge in 1901

His visitors disembarked at the OR&N Corbett stop so there was already a Corbett station of sorts before the town was named after him. After several name changes, the post office in the area was named "Corbett" in 1895.

Corbett School District runs the Corbett School and the Corbett Charter School.

== Notable people ==
- Henry W. Corbett, Oregon pioneer who owned farm overlooking the Columbia River Gorge here and town is named after
- Julius Meier, politician
- Billy Oskay, musician
- Patti Smith, politician
- Fritz Springmeier, author
- Dave Stief, football player
