= National Register of Historic Places listings in Tazewell County, Virginia =

Location of Tazewell County in Virginia

This is intended to be a complete list of the properties and districts on the National Register of Historic Places in Tazewell County, Virginia, United States. The locations of National Register properties and districts for which the latitude and longitude coordinates are included below, may be seen in an online map.

There are 23 properties and districts listed on the National Register in the county, including 1 National Historic Landmark.

This National Park Service list is complete through NPS recent listings posted March 21, 2025.

== Current listings ==
| | Name on the Register | Image | Date listed | Location | City or town | Description |
|---|---|---|---|---|---|---|
| 1 | Big Crab Orchard Site | Big Crab Orchard Site | August 11, 1980 (#80004230) | Grounds of Historic Crab Orchard Museum, 3663 Crab Orchard Rd. 37°07′10″N 81°34′28″W | Tazewell | |
| 2 | Bluefield Commercial Historic District | | November 7, 2024 (#100010975) | Virginia Avenue, Spring Street, S. College Avenue; 37°15′09″N 81°16′16″W | Bluefield | |
| 3 | Bull Thistle Cave Archeological Site (44TZ92) | | September 10, 1987 (#87001531) | Address Restricted | Tazewell | |
| 4 | Burke's Garden Central Church And Cemetery | Burke's Garden Central Church And Cemetery | May 7, 1979 (#79003092) | Southeast of Burke's Garden on Burkes Garden Rd. 37°05′33″N 81°20′10″W | Burke's Garden | |
| 5 | Burke's Garden Rural Historic District | Burke's Garden Rural Historic District | February 25, 1986 (#86000306) | Valley encircled by Garden Mountain; 37°05′51″N 81°20′23″W | Tazewell | |
| 6 | Chimney Rock Farm | Chimney Rock Farm | July 8, 1982 (#82004607) | State Route 91; 37°04′40″N 81°36′31″W | Tazewell | |
| 7 | Clinch Valley Roller Mills | Clinch Valley Roller Mills | October 4, 1984 (#84000056) | River Street Dr. 37°05′18″N 81°45′57″W | Cedar Bluff | |
| 8 | Clynchdale | Clynchdale | August 15, 2016 (#16000540) | 146 Beartown Rd. 37°04′51″N 81°28′31″W | Tazewell | |
| 9 | Indian Paintings | | December 3, 1969 (#69000284) | Address Restricted | Maiden Spring | |
| 10 | Maiden Spring | Maiden Spring | August 16, 1994 (#94000987) | Junction of State Route 91 and Wardell Rd. 37°01′48″N 81°41′01″W | Pounding Mill | |
| 11 | Capt. James Moore Homestead | Capt. James Moore Homestead | November 24, 2002 (#02001363) | Abbs Valley Rd. 37°16′07″N 81°23′38″W | Boissevain | |
| 12 | Old Kentucky Turnpike Historic District | Old Kentucky Turnpike Historic District | July 7, 1995 (#95000829) | Along Indian Creek Rd., Old Kentucky Turnpike, College Hill Rd., and Cedar Valley Dr. 37°05′21″N 81°45′42″W | Cedar Bluff | |
| 13 | Pocahontas Historic District | Pocahontas Historic District | November 3, 1972 (#72001418) | Corporate boundaries of Pocahontas including cemetery 37°18′20″N 81°20′20″W | Pocahontas | |
| 14 | Pocahontas Mine No. 1 | Pocahontas Mine No. 1 | October 12, 1994 (#94001651) | Shop Hollow Rd. 37°18′27″N 81°20′46″W | Pocahontas | |
| 15 | Richlands Historic District | Richlands Historic District | May 2, 2007 (#07000394) | Includes portions of Front, 2nd, 3rd, and 4th Sts., and Grayson Ave., Lee St., Washington Sq., and Suffolk Ave. 37°05′40″N 81°47′45″W | Richlands | |
| 16 | Alexander St. Clair House | Alexander St. Clair House | June 28, 1982 (#82004606) | West of Bluefield on Hockman Pike; 37°13′58″N 81°18′53″W | Bluefield | |
| 17 | Walter McDonald Sanders House | Walter McDonald Sanders House | November 21, 2002 (#02001370) | College Ave. 37°14′20″N 81°15′34″W | Bluefield | |
| 18 | Tazewell Avenue Historic District | Tazewell Avenue Historic District | March 31, 2010 (#10000147) | Tazewell Ave., Fairfax Ave., Front St., 2nd St., 3rd St., and 4th St. 37°05′49″N 81°48′24″W | Richlands | |
| 19 | Tazewell Depot | Tazewell Depot | February 17, 2015 (#15000020) | 135 Railroad Ave. 37°07′58″N 81°31′35″W | Tazewell | |
| 20 | Tazewell Historic District | Tazewell Historic District | May 16, 2002 (#02000519) | Main, Church, Tower, and Pine Sts., Central Ave., and Fincastle Turnpike; also the 100 block of W. Fincastle Turnpike, the 200 and 300 blocks of W. Main St., and the 300 block of W. Pine St. 37°06′58″N 81°31′12″W | Tazewell | Second set of addresses represents a boundary increase 2016-08-15 |
| 21 | George Oscar Thompson House | George Oscar Thompson House | June 28, 1982 (#82004608) | Thompson Valley Rd. 37°04′20″N 81°33′18″W | Tazewell | |
| 22 | Williams House | Williams House | July 7, 1983 (#83003319) | 102 Suffolk Ave. 37°05′37″N 81°47′54″W | Richlands | |
| 23 | James Wynn House | James Wynn House | October 28, 1992 (#92001368) | 408 S. Elk St. 37°06′52″N 81°31′08″W | Tazewell | |

== See also ==
- List of National Historic Landmarks in Virginia
- National Register of Historic Places listings in Virginia
