= Capt. James Moore Homestead =

Archaeological site in Virginia, United States

- U.S. National Register of Historic Places
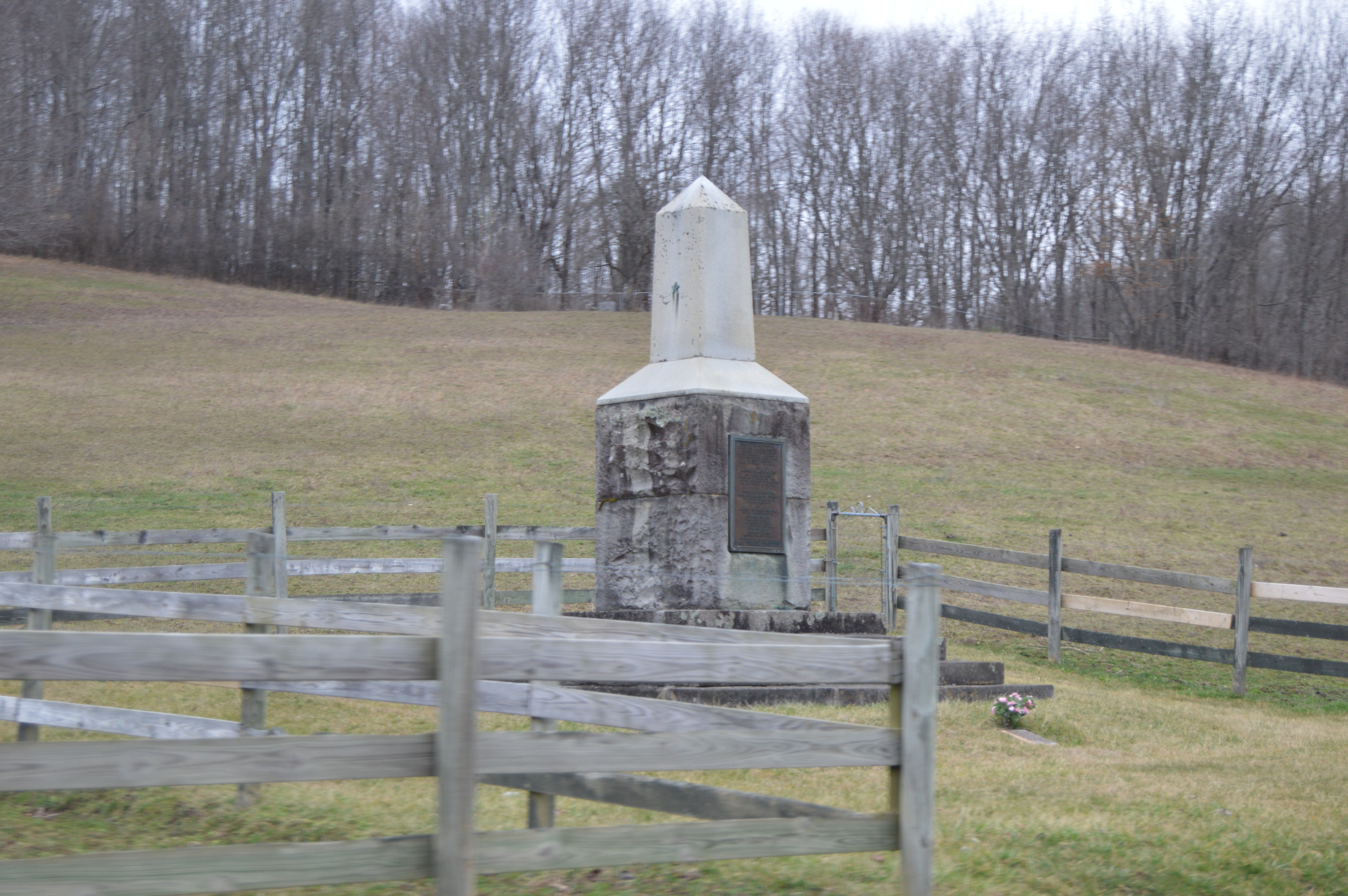
- Site of the homestead

- Location within Virginia Location within the United States
- Location: VA 644, Boissevain, Virginia
- Coordinates: 37°16′7″N 81°23′38″W
- Area: 4.7 acres (1.9 ha)
- Built: 1772
- NRHP reference No.: 02001363
- Added to NRHP: November 24, 2002

The Capt. James Moore Homestead is an archaeological site in rural Tazewell County, Virginia, United States. The site is located near Boissevain, and has both colonial and Native American significance. There was once a palisaded Native village from the Late Woodland period on the site, and it was chosen by James Moore, a local militia captain who was one of Tazewell County's early settlers, as the site of his homestead in 1772. Sixteen years later (1786) he was killed by a Shawnee party that also took his family prisoner.

The site was listed on the National Register of Historic Places in 2002.

== See also ==
- National Register of Historic Places listings in Tazewell County, Virginia
