= Exhibition mine =

An exhibition mine is a mine that is accessible to the public and contains exhibitions about that particular mine and about the mining industry or coal industry in general, effectively doubling as a museum.

== Notable exhibition mines ==
- Cape Breton Miners Museum - Glace Bay, Nova Scotia
- El Chiflón del Diablo - Arauco Basin, Chile
- Fell Exhibition Slate Mine - Trier, Germany
- Lackawanna Coal Mine Tour - Scranton, Pennsylvania
- Phillips-Sprague Mine - on the National Register of Historic Places in New River Park, Beckley, West Virginia
- Pocahontas Exhibition Coal Mine - Pocahontas, Virginia, United States
- Salt Cathedral of Zipaquirá - Altiplano Cundiboyacense, Colombia
- Wieliczka Salt Mine – Wieliczka, southern Poland
