= North Tazewell, Virginia =

Neighborhood in Virginia, United States

- Neighborhood
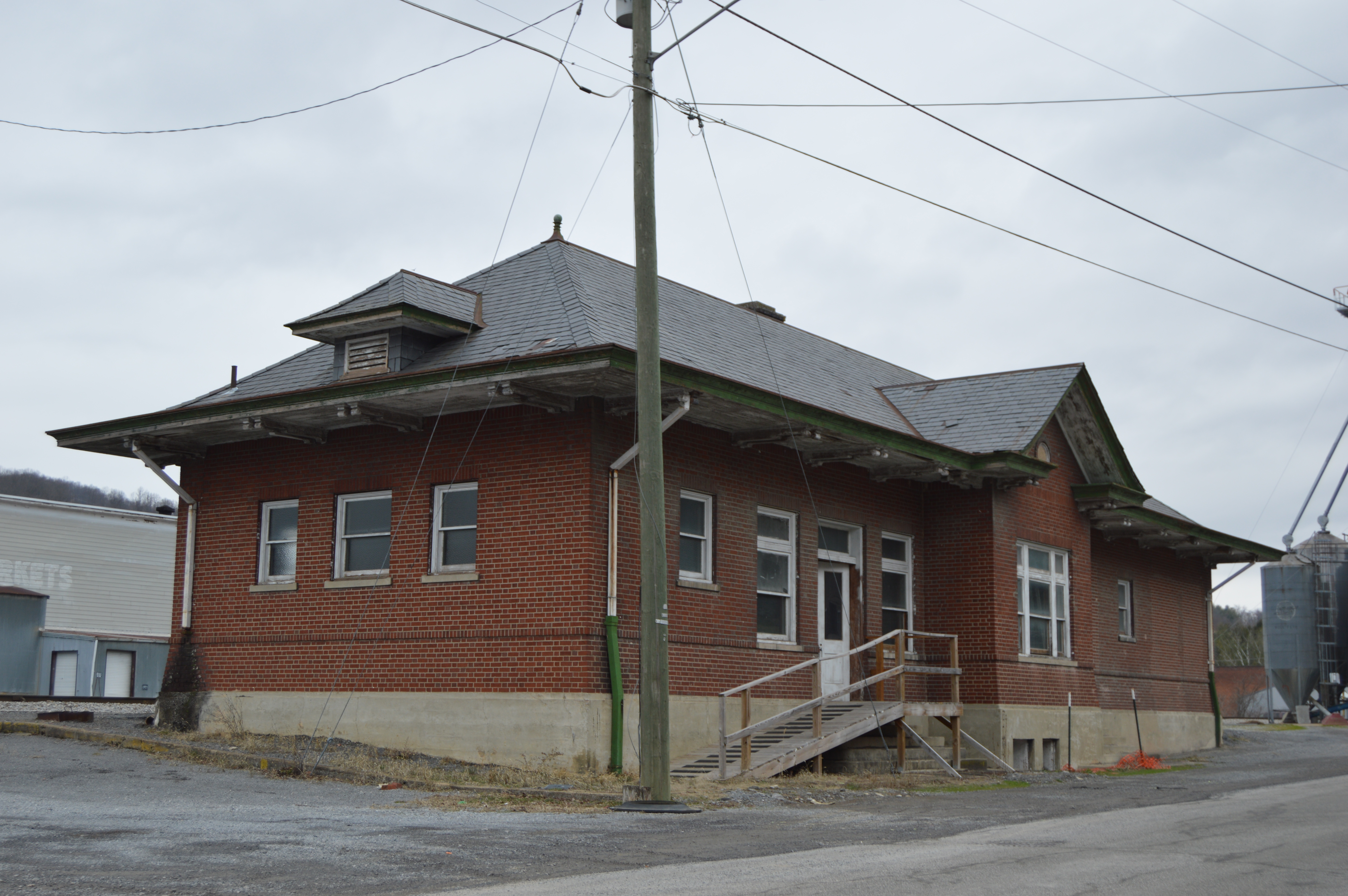
- The structure of Tazewell station on the National Register of Historic Places

- Location within Virginia
- Coordinates: 37°07′58″N 81°31′37″W
- Country: United States
- State: Virginia
- County: Tazewell
- Elevation: 2,405 ft (733 m)
- Time zone: UTC-5 (Eastern (EST))
  - Summer (DST): UTC-4 (EDT)
- ZIP code: 24630
- Area code: 276
- GNIS feature ID: 1499807

North Tazewell is a neighborhood of Tazewell, Virginia, United States. North Tazewell has its own post office with ZIP code 24630. Cavitt's Creek Park at Lake Witten and Tazewell station are located in North Tazewell.

Civilian Conservation Corps Camp was established in 1933, believed to be on land owned by the A.R. Beavers & Sons Dairy.

Project	Co. #	Date	Railroad	Post Office
S-54	1392	6/4/1933	North Tazewell	North Tazewell
