= Clynchdale =

Historic house in Virginia, United States

- U.S. National Register of Historic Places
- U.S. Historic district
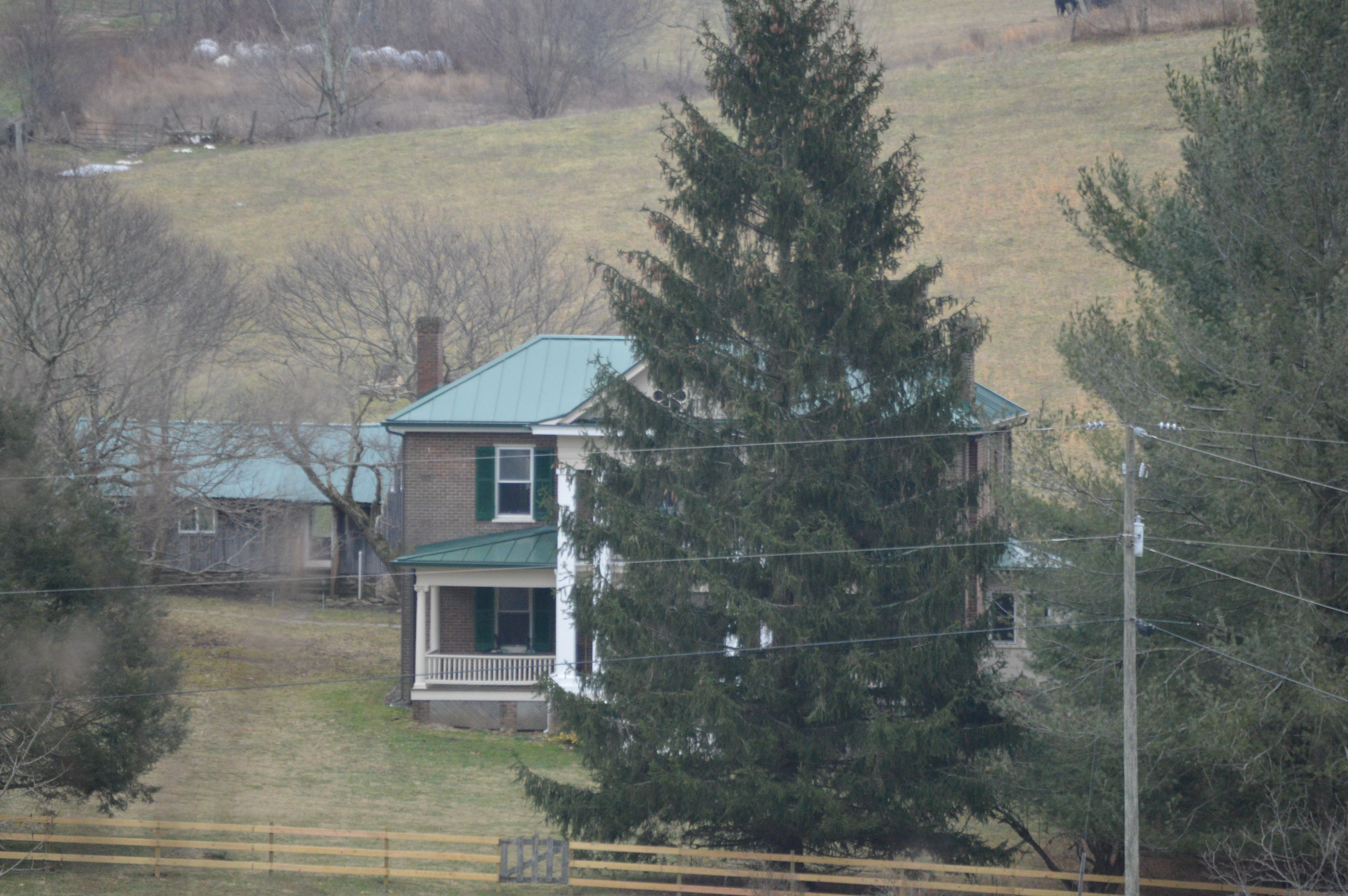

- Location within Virginia Location within the United States
- Location: 146 Beartown Rd., near Tazewell, Virginia
- Coordinates: 37°4′51″N 81°28′31″W
- Area: 240 acres (97 ha)
- Built: c. 1830
- Architectural style: Greek Revival
- NRHP reference No.: 16000540
- Added to NRHP: August 15, 2014

Clynchdale, also known as the Archibald Thompson House, is a historic farm property at 146 Beartown Road, in the rural Thompson Valley south of Tazewell in Tazewell County, Virginia. The property is a small remnant of the estate of Archibald Thompson, one of the first to be established in the valley. The brick main house has a long construction history beginning about 1830, and is one of the grandest representatives of Federal Greek Revival architecture.

The property was listed on the National Register of Historic Places in 2016.

== See also ==
- National Register of Historic Places listings in Tazewell County, Virginia
