= Claypool Hill Mall =

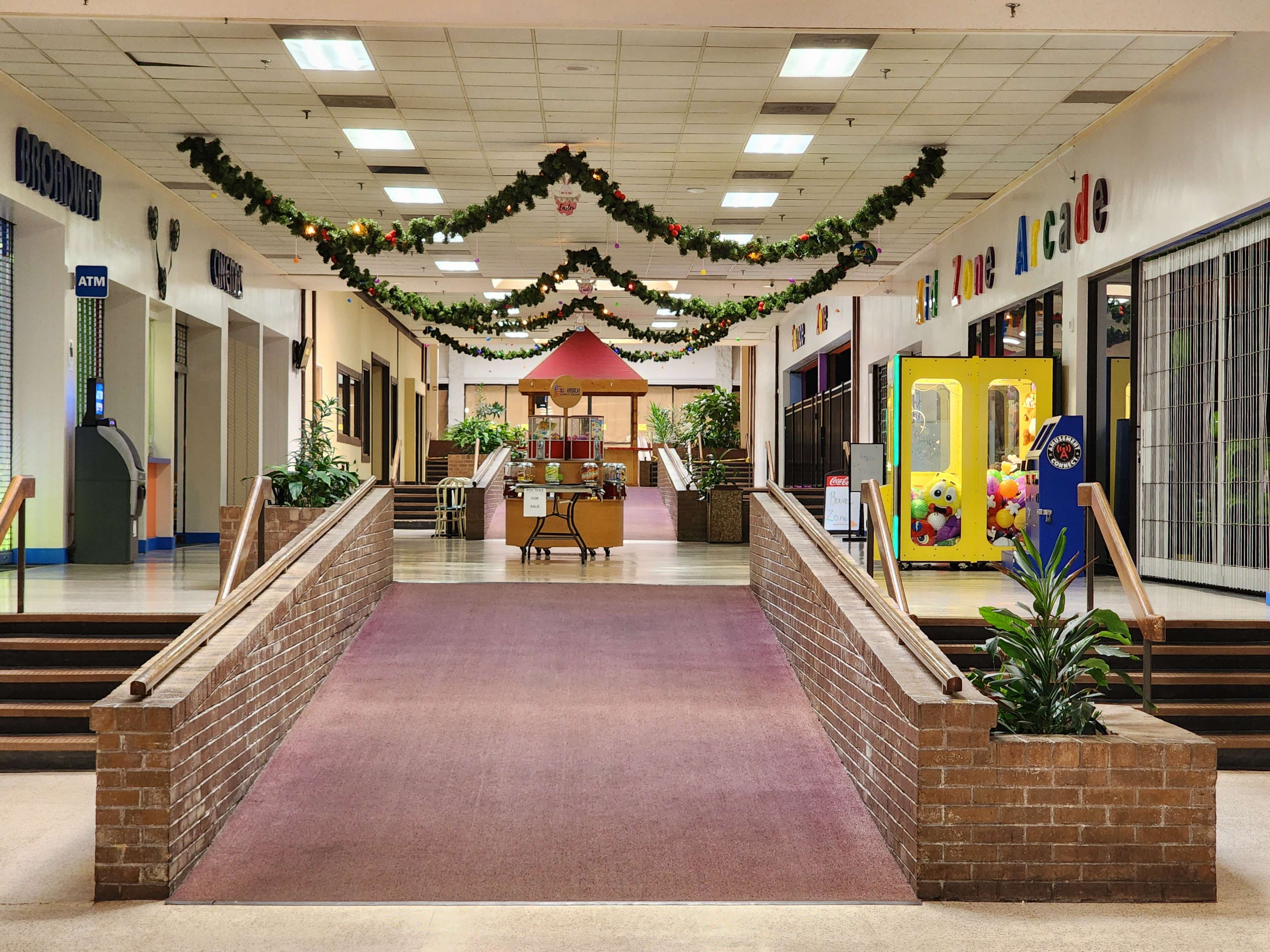
- Interior of Claypool Hill Mall in 2024.
- Location: Cedar Bluff, Virginia, United States
- Coordinates: 37.066700°N 81.757050°W
- Opened: March 18, 1982
- Developer: Paul Buskill and Claypool Hill Associates
- Num. of anchor tenants: 1 (1 Vacant)
- Floor area: 258,171 sq ft (23,984.9 m^{2})
- Floors: 1

Claypool Hill Mall is a regional shopping mall located in Tazewell County, Virginia, United States. Until 2026, it was anchored by Belk.

== History ==
The Claypool Hill Mall broke ground in 1981, at the intersection of U.S. Route 19 and U.S. Route 460. Located on approximately 25 acres of land, planned anchors called for a 55,552 square foot Kmart store, a then unnamed 41,586 square foot department store, a 28,875 square foot Piggly Wiggly, and a 10,125 square foot space for a drug store. The Piggly Wiggly would not be built. Inline mall space would amount to 75,625 square feet, and have room for 38 shops. The developer for the property was Paul Buskill, and Claypool Hill Associates.

The mall opened its doors on March 18, 1982, with anchors Kmart and Leggetts. Popular names occupying the new shopping center included Sidney's, Hickory Farms, and Kinney Shoes. The mall was built as to "provide a natural effect and feel of the outdoors," by having live plants and garden beds present throughout the mall, in addition to 3 fountains. Also notable in the mall was a community room with space for 400 people.

Leggetts wouldn't have their grand opening until August 18, 1982. With roughly 34,000 square feet of retail space, it would have room for 43 merchandise departments and employ 72 people.

=== 1990's ===
In 1994, Food City would break ground on a 33,562-square-foot grocery store on the mall property. The expected opening was slated for June 1995.

Leggett would officially become Belk at the Claypool Hill Mall in January 1997, with the old signage being taken down for the new Belk insignia. All 31 Leggett Stores were acquired by Belk and underwent this name change, but the stores would resume operations as normal.

Stores shown off in a 1998 flyer for the mall included Disc Jockey, Dollar General, Merle Norman Cosmetics, Regis, Belk, Sears, and Shoe Show, among others.

The mall was sold from its owner of over ten years, Ruby Clifton, to a group known as C&J Associates in September 1999 for an undisclosed amount. The group, headquartered in Bristol, Virginia, operated six retail centers, including the mall, at the time of purchase. The C & J in their name stood for the owners, Tim Carter and Steve Johnson.

=== 2000's ===
In September 2000, a couple from nearby Richlands, Virginia announced they would open a multiplex cinema at the mall. Featuring reclining love-seat style seating and a 2000-square-foot arcade, the theater was scheduled to open on November 1, 2000.

On April 28, 2001, it was announced that Dixie Pottery would join the mall. The expected opening was May 1, and it would be the second location in the company's 44-year history.

=== 2010's ===
At the start of 2016, it was announced that the Kmart location, operating under Big Kmart, would close in April. The store employed 50 people, and the liquidation sale would start on January 24, 2016.

=== 2020's ===
In March 2023, it was announced that Belk would switch to an outlet-style location, offering discounted items from other Belk stores nationwide.

Belk Outlet is stated to be one of the final remaining tenants occupying the mall, alongside Broadway Cinema, Subway and Anytime Fitness.

In 2024, Subway, the last restaurant in the mall, closed. In 2025, Broadway Cinemas would begin selling food to offer a restaurant location in the mall.

=== 2026 ===
As of January 2026, Belk Outlet, the last remaining store in Claypool Hill Mall, announced they'll be going out of business, officially leaving Broadway Cinemas and Anytime Fitness as the last tenants of the mall.
