= Phillips-Sprague Mine =

- U.S. National Register of Historic Places
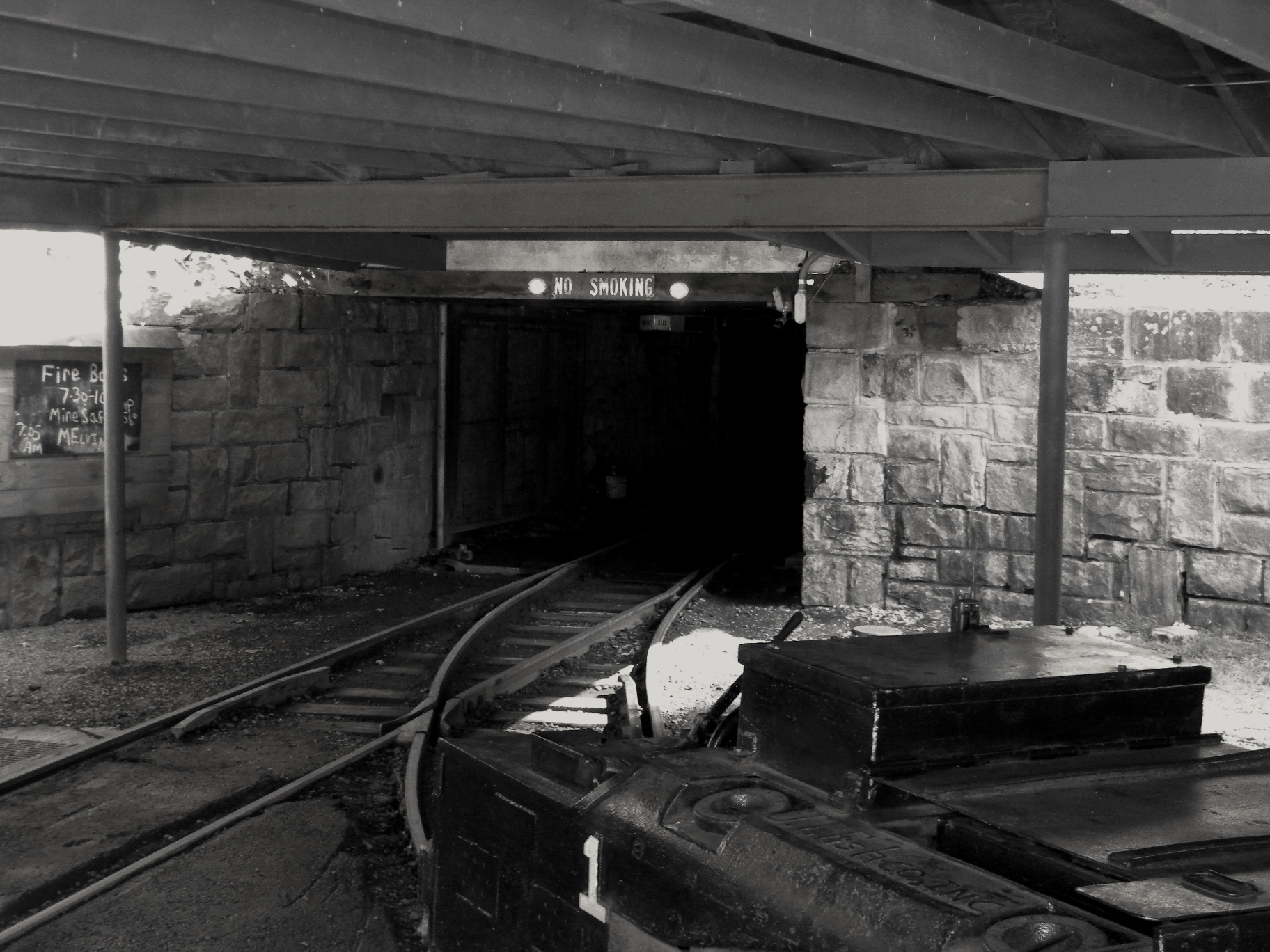
- Beckley Exhibition Mine Portal

- Location within West Virginia Location within the United States
- Location: New River Park, Beckley, West Virginia
- Coordinates: 37°47′03″N 81°11′37″W
- Area: 0.3 acres (0.12 ha)
- Built: 1889
- NRHP reference No.: 88000266
- Added to NRHP: March 25, 1988

Phillips-Sprague Mine, also known as the Beckley Exhibition Coal Mine, is a historic coal mine located at New River Park in Beckley, Raleigh County, West Virginia.

The mine opened about 1889 on what had been operated as a drift mine. Commercial development of the drift mine began in 1905 and the first coal was shipped on January 4, 1906. Mine operations ceased in 1953, and the property sold to the City of Beckley.

The Beckley Exhibition Coal Mine opened in 1962, as the first historic site wholly dedicated to educating the public about coal mining. It consists of 1,500 feet of restored passageways and entries with 3,000 feet of vintage track. It reopened to the public on April 1, 2008. It is a preserved coal mine that offers daily tours and a history lesson on coal mining in Appalachia.

It was listed on the National Register of Historic Places in 1988.
