= Pocahontas Exhibition Coal Mine =

- U.S. National Register of Historic Places
- U.S. National Historic Landmark District
- Virginia Landmarks Register
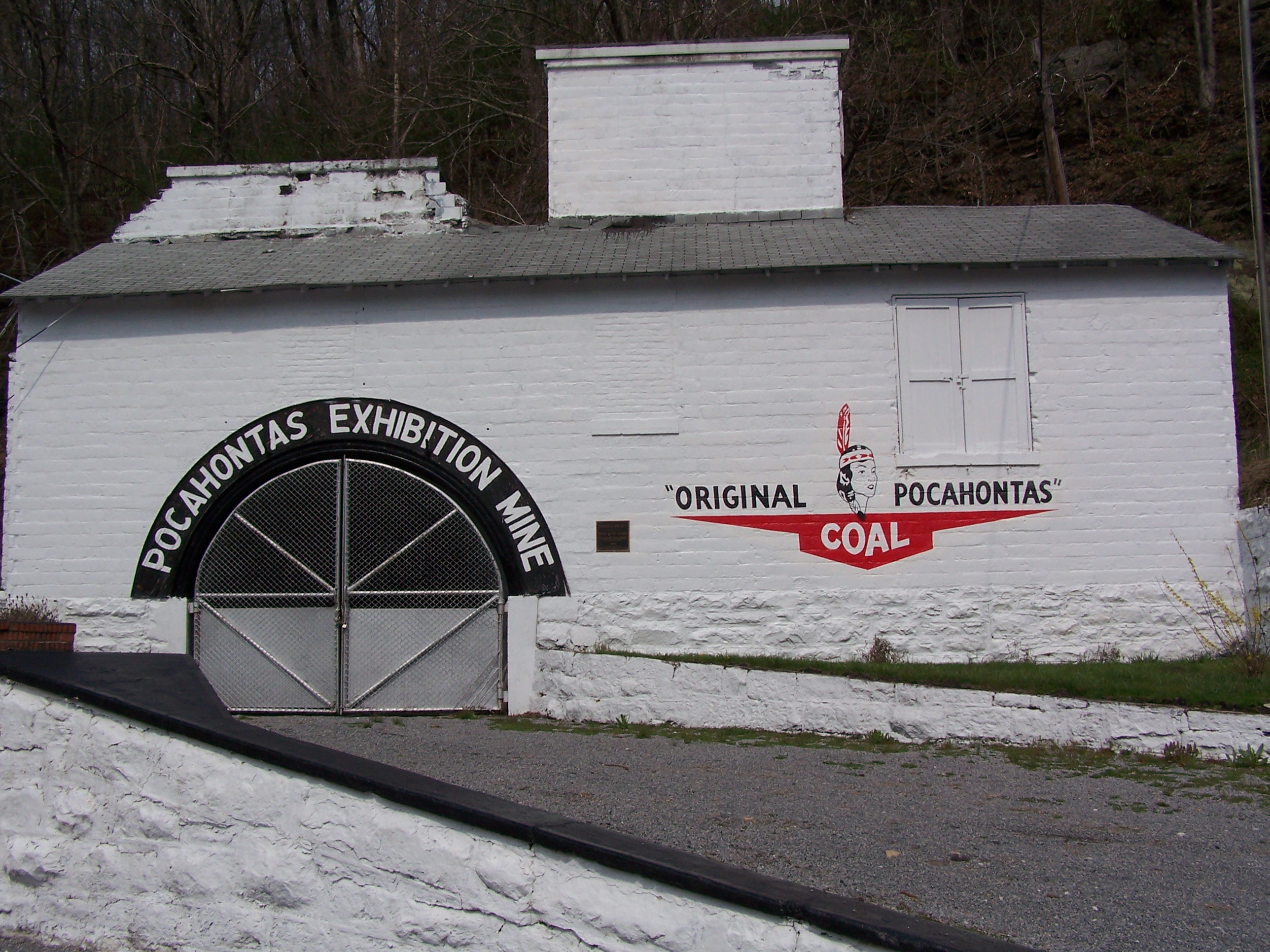
- Mine portal

- Location within Virginia Location within the United States
- Location: Rt. 659, 215 Shop Hollow Rd., Pocahontas, Virginia
- Coordinates: 37°18′29″N 81°20′59″W
- Built: 1882
- NRHP reference No.: 94001651
- VLR No.: 092-0011-0284

Significant dates
- Added to NRHP: October 12, 1994
- Designated NHLD: October 12, 1994
- Designated VLR: March 19, 1997

Pocahontas Exhibition Coal Mine, also known as Pocahontas Mine No. 1, or Baby Mine, is an inactive coal mine in the Pocahontas Coalfield, in Pocahontas in western Virginia. The mine was the first in the sub-bituminous coal of the Pocahontas Coalfield, opening in 1882. In 1938 it became the first exhibition coal mine in the United States. Uniquely, it was possible to drive one's automobile through the mine, entering through the fan opening and exiting through the original entry. The practice continued until 1970, when it was discontinued due to damage to the roof of the mine from car exhaust.

The site is also notable for its history of coke production on site for transportation by rail to steel mills. Pocahontas coal was especially suitable for coking, and played a significant role in the industrial development of the United States. Coke and coal were shipped by rail to Norfolk, Virginia for trans-shipment to eastern US ports and overseas. Coking on the site was eventually discontinued, and the mine spoil pile covers the area where the beehive ovens were located. Only three oven ruins remain, overgrown with trees.

This mine, when active, supplied the United States Navy a majority of its coal through both world wars. Its smokeless quality allowed ships to go undetected from distances, thus giving the Navy an advantage over enemies. By the end of the second world war, coal in the "baby mine" was waning. Technology was advancing and reducing the number of miners required to do the work and allowed for the creation of the exhibition mine. In 1955 mining ceased in Pocahontas altogether.

It was declared a National Historic Landmark in 1994.

== See also ==
- Pocahontas Historic District
- Tazewell County Virginia
- List of National Historic Landmarks in Virginia
- National Register of Historic Places listings in Tazewell County, Virginia
