= Old Kentucky Turnpike Historic District =

Historic district in Virginia, United States

- U.S. National Register of Historic Places
- U.S. Historic district
- Virginia Landmarks Register
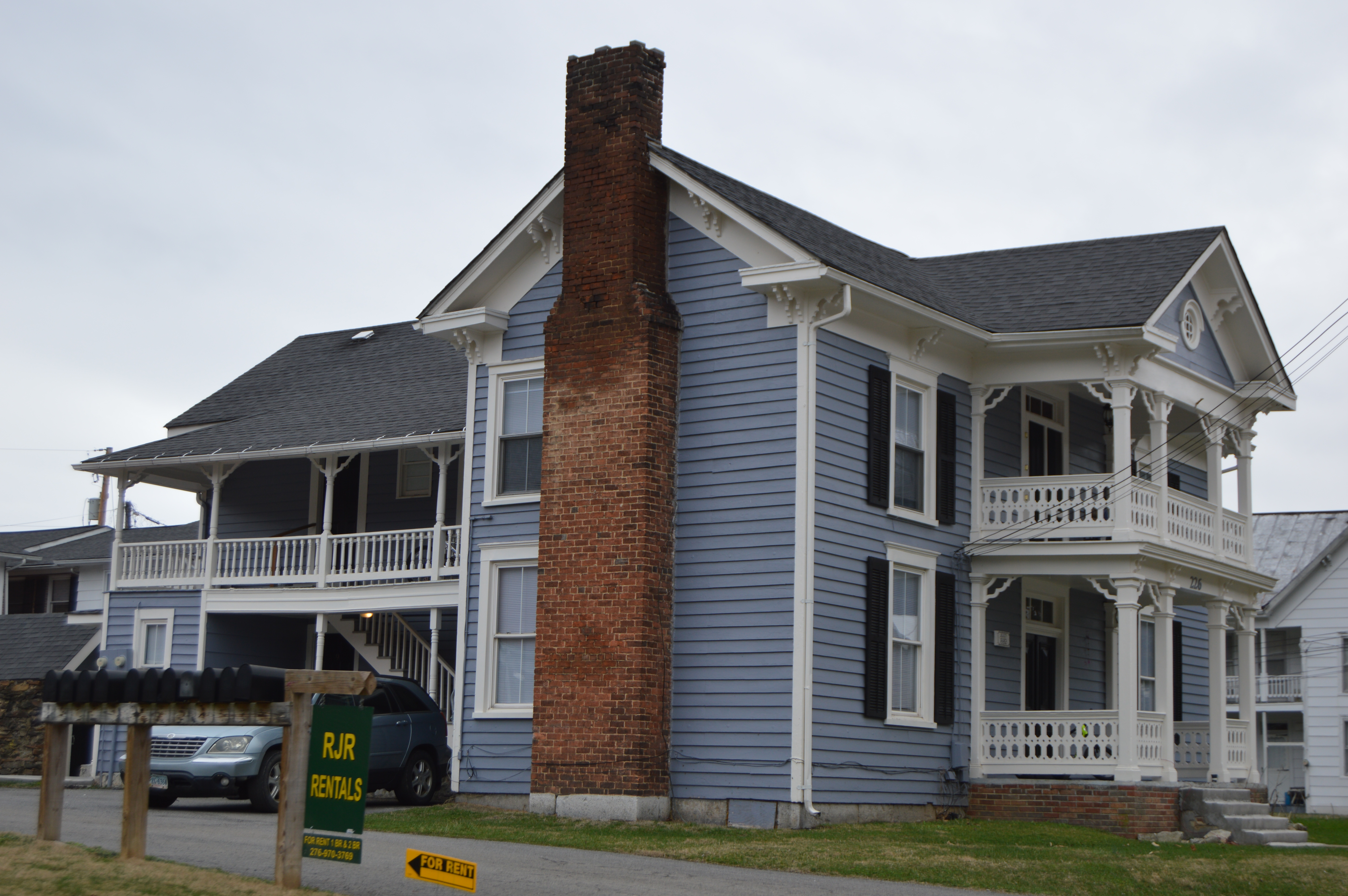
- The Ratliffe House, one of the core parts of the district

- Location within Virginia Location within the United States
- Location: Along Indian Creek Rd., Old Kentucky Tnpk., College Hill Rd. and Cedar Valley Dr., Cedar Bluff, Virginia
- Coordinates: 37°5′20″N 81°45′49″W
- Area: 48 acres (19 ha)
- Built: 1873
- Built by: Thomas Cubine
- Architectural style: Mid 19th Century Revival, Late Victorian, Late 19th And 20th Century Revivals
- NRHP reference No.: 95000829
- VLR No.: 184-0001

Significant dates
- Added to NRHP: July 7, 1995
- Designated VLR: April 28, 1995

Old Kentucky Turnpike Historic District is a national historic district located at Cedar Bluff, Tazewell County, Virginia. The district encompasses 35 contributing buildings, 3 contributing sites, and 3 contributing structures along Indian Creek Road and Indian Creek. They date from the late-19th to mid-20th centuries. Notable resources include the concrete bridge, steel railroad trestle, Cecil-Watkins House, Ratliff House, Cedar Bluff Presbyterian Church (c. 1930), the boyhood home of Governor George C. Peery (1873–1952), Thomas Cubine House (c. 1887), Gillespie House (c. 1892), the Old Cedar Bluff High School, Cedar Bluff High School (1906), and the Old Cedar Bluff Town Hall. Also located in the district is the separately listed Clinch Valley Roller Mills.

It was listed on the National Register of Historic Places in 1995.
