= Indian Paintings =

Archaeological site in Virginia, United States

- U.S. National Register of Historic Places
- Virginia Landmarks Register
- Nearest city: Maiden Spring, Virginia
- Area: 0 acres (0 ha)
- NRHP reference No.: 69000284
- VLR No.: 092-0007

Significant dates
- Added to NRHP: December 3, 1969
- Designated VLR: May 13, 1969

Indian Paintings is a historic archaeological site located near Maiden Spring, Tazewell County, Virginia. These pictographs are on a rock face high on Paint Lick Mountain. Stretched in a horizontal line along the irregular exposure is a series of simple images representing thunderbirds, human figures, deer, arrows, trees, and the sun, all painted in a red medium using iron oxide.

It was listed on the National Register of Historic Places in 1969.
