= Pocahontas State Correctional Center =

Medium-security prison in Virginia, United States

- Interactive map of Pocahontas State Correctional Center
- Location: 920 Old River Road Pocahontas, Virginia; 37°17′50″N 81°21′55″W
- Status: Open
- Security class: Level4/5
- Capacity: 1,034
- Opened: 2007
- Managed by: Virginia Department of Corrections
- Website: https://www.vadoc.virginia.gov/facilities-and-offices/

The Pocahontas State Correctional Center is a medium-security prison located on 35 acres (140,000 m^{2}) in Tazewell County, just west of the town of Pocahontas, Virginia. The $68.6 million facility was completed in the summer of 2007, and opened in September, 2007.

== Details ==
The prison has the capacity to house 1,000 inmates in the general population, and 24 inmates in the segregation units. The number of people employed at the prison is expected to reach 330.

The prison will provide counseling and group programs, including Alcoholics Anonymous, Narcotics Anonymous, Anger Control, Breaking Barriers, and Phases I and II of Psycho-Educational Substance Abuse.

Basic education/GED preparation, Literary Incentive Program, and college courses will be offered to inmates. Additionally, vocational courses will be provided, including electricity, small engine and motorcycle repair, floor covering, general maintenance, carpentry, plumbing and computer literacy.
