= Cedar Bluff Overlook Park =

Coordinates: 37°4′56″N 81°45′43″W

Cedar Bluff Overlook Park is a recreational park located on a high bluff in the town of Cedar Bluff, Virginia in Tazewell County, Virginia, United States. The park grounds feature a stepped trail with dramatic views of the town and the Clinch River which winds through the small town of Cedar Bluff, the birthplace of former Virginia Governor George C. Peery. The park contains three picnic shelters, horseshoe pits, badminton court, restrooms and a playground, as well as parking space for guests.

An American Civil War interpretive marker is located at the park.
