= Big Crab Orchard Site =

Archaeological site in Virginia, United States

- U.S. National Register of Historic Places
- Virginia Landmarks Register
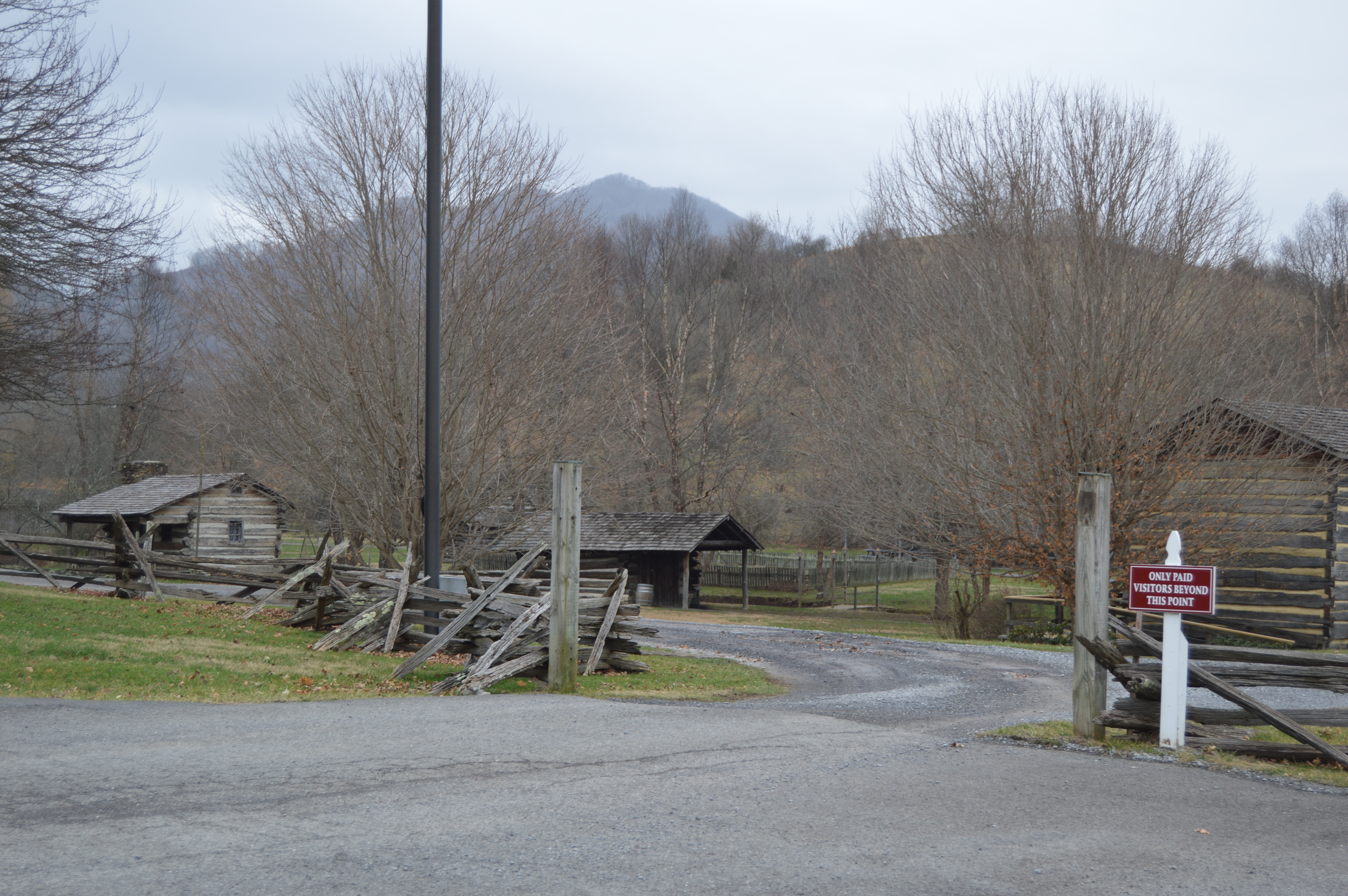
- Reconstructed buildings at the site

- Location within Virginia Location within the United States
- Nearest city: Tazewell, Virginia
- Coordinates: 37°7′11″N 81°34′28″W
- Area: 115 acres (47 ha)
- Built: c. 1768
- Built by: John Whitten, et al.
- NRHP reference No.: 80004230
- VLR No.: 092-0013

Significant dates
- Added to NRHP: August 11, 1980
- Designated VLR: May 13, 1969

Big Crab Orchard Site is a historic archaeological site located near Tazewell, Tazewell County, Virginia. The Crab Orchard site was patented in 1750, and was one of the first European settlements in Southwest Virginia. Parts of the tract were later owned by Morris Griffith and William Ingles and then acquired by Thomas Witten Sr., who settled here about 1768.

It was listed on the National Register of Historic Places in 1980. It is also known as Fort Witten or Witten's Fort and Pisgah Church, according to the National Register Nomination Form.
