= George Oscar Thompson House =

Historic house in Virginia, United States

- U.S. National Register of Historic Places
- Virginia Landmarks Register
- Location within Virginia Location within the United States
- Location: Route 604, near Tazewell, Virginia
- Coordinates: 37°4′19″N 81°33′21″W
- Area: 17 acres (6.9 ha)
- Built: 1886-1887
- Built by: Thomas Mastin Hawkins
- Architectural style: Log house
- NRHP reference No.: 82004608
- VLR No.: 092-0018

Significant dates
- Added to NRHP: June 28, 1982
- Designated VLR: November 18, 1980

George Oscar Thompson House, also known as the Sam Ward Bishop House, was a historic home located near Tazewell, Tazewell County, Virginia. It was built in 1886–1887, and was a two-story, three-bay, T-shaped frame dwelling. It had a foundation of rubble limestone. The front facade featured a one-story porch on the center bay supported by chamfered posts embellished with sawn brackets. Also on the property were a contributing limestone spring house, a one-room log structure (late 18th- to early 19th-century), and a 1 1/2-story frame structure (1831 through 1851). Tradition suggests the latter buildings were the first and second houses built by the Thompson family.

The house was listed on the National Register of Historic Places in 1982.

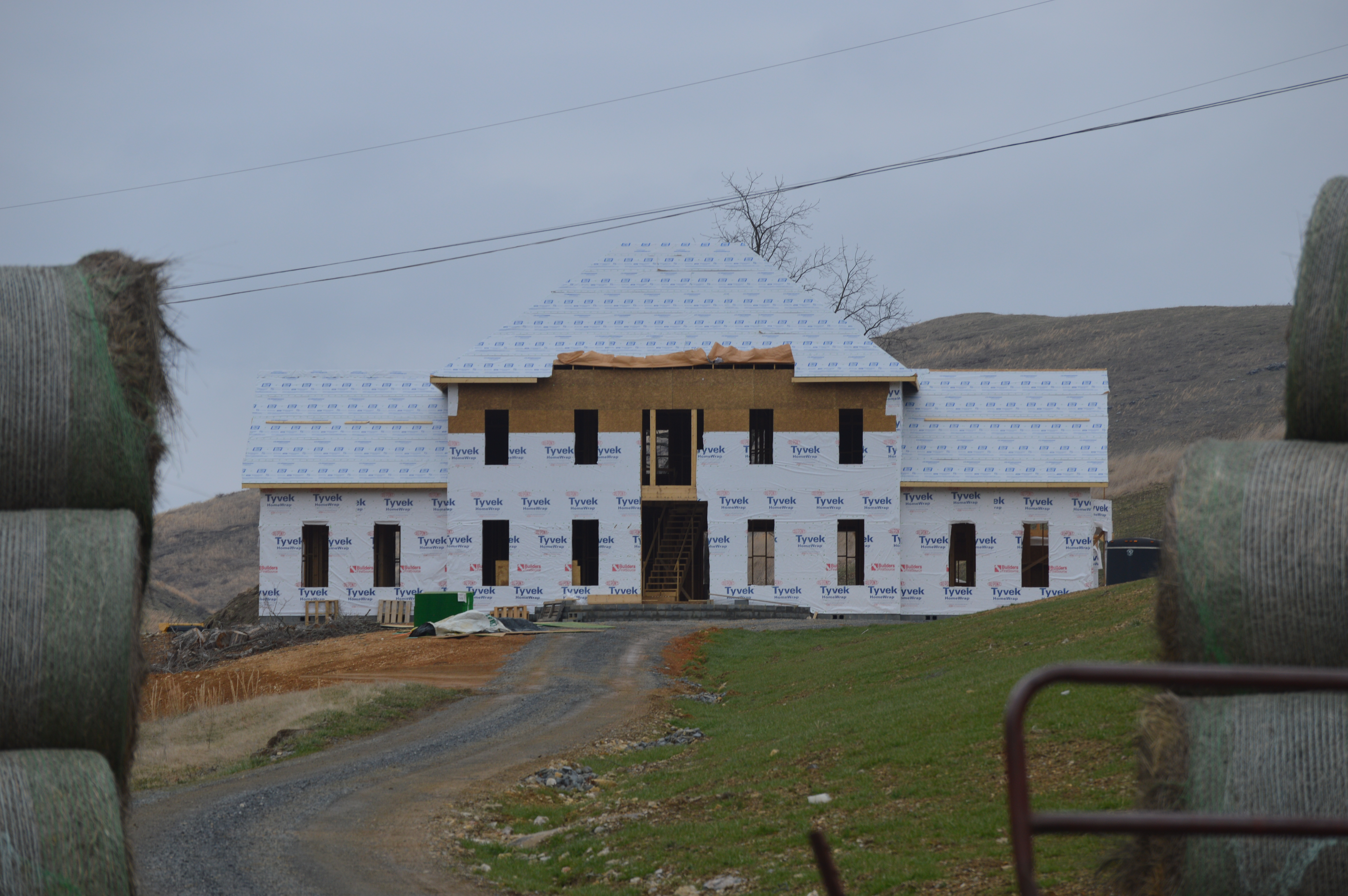
Former site of the house; a different residence was under construction in 2017

It was demolished by 2017, when a new house was photographed under construction on this site.
