= Cedar Bluff, Virginia =

- Town
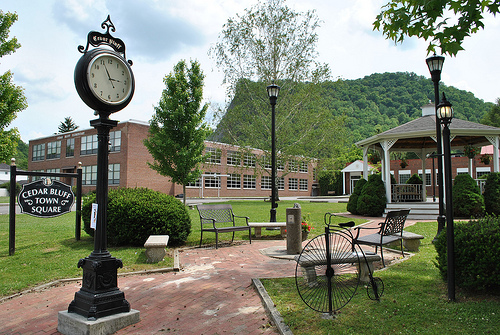
- Cedar Bluff Virginia Town Square

- Seal
- Motto: "A Rich Historical Heritage"
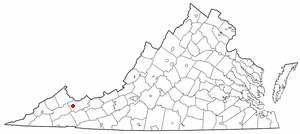
- Location in the Commonwealth of Virginia
- Coordinates: 37°5′17″N 81°45′53″W
- Country: United States
- State: Virginia
- County: Tazewell
- Established: Founded 1800, Incorporated 1912

Government
  - Type: Town Manager Plan
  - Mayor: Kenneth McVey

Area
  - Total: 2.13 sq mi (5.51 km^{2})
  - Land: 2.09 sq mi (5.41 km^{2})
  - Water: 0.039 sq mi (0.10 km^{2})
- Elevation: 1,955 ft (596 m)

Population (2020)
  - Total: 1,069
  - Estimate (2019): 1,002
  - Density: 479.4/sq mi (185.08/km^{2})
- U.S. Census Bureau, 2000 Population Estimates
- Time zone: UTC−5 (EST)
  - Summer (DST): UTC−4 (EDT)
- ZIP code: 24609
- Area code: 276
- FIPS code: 51-13784
- GNIS feature ID: 1500063
- Website: www.townofcedarbluff.com

Cedar Bluff is a town in Tazewell County, Virginia, United States. As of the 2020 census, Cedar Bluff had a population of 1,069. It is part of the Bluefield, WV-VA micropolitan area, which has a population of 107,578.

== History ==
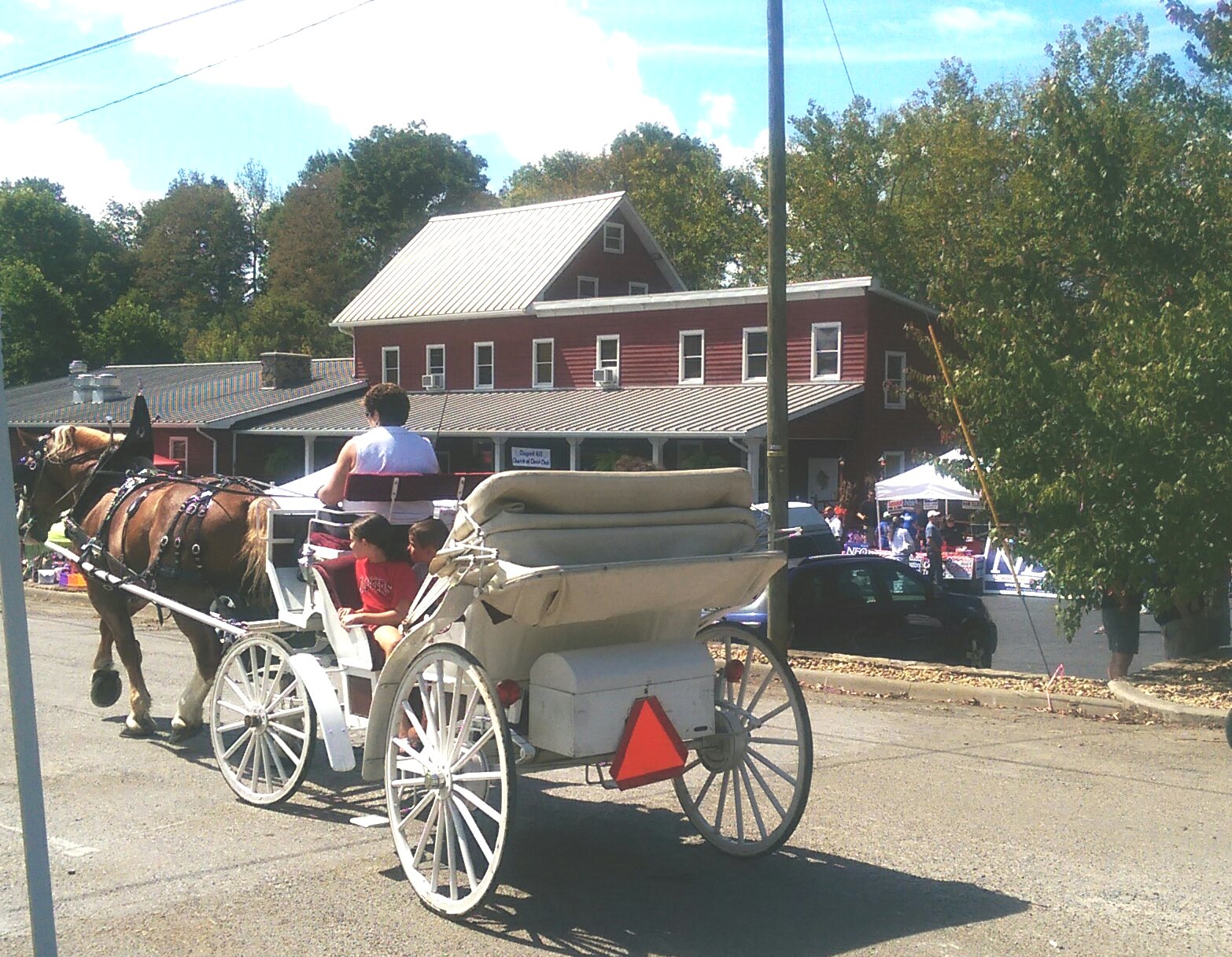
Historic Cedar Bluff Carriage Tour

Cedar Bluff is a 19th-century mill town located on the banks of the Clinch River in Tazewell County, Virginia. Centered around the Old Kentucky Turnpike, a street looking much as it did when the Virginia Legislature chartered the thoroughfare in 1848, the nationally listed historic district extends from the restored old grist mill to the 1873 birthplace of Virginia Governor George C. Peery.

Cedar Bluff is the home of the Clinch Valley Blanket Mill which housed the Goodwin weavers, in operation from 1890 through World War II.

The Virginia Civil War Trails project includes a Cedar Bluff battle site, with two markers detailing the event. There are also several marked graves of Civil War Soldiers in the historic Jones Chapel Cemetery located in the West end of Cedar Bluff.

In addition, Cedar Bluff is home to the Cedar Bluff Overlook Park located high on a bluff overlooking the Clinch River and the downtown area of Cedar Bluff. Along the Overlook Trail, there are interpretive signs with information on the Clinch River habitat, including federally listed endangered species, as well as information on the geology of the bluff itself.

Also in Cedar Bluff there are ruins of the old McGuire Mill dam with the adjoining picnic area and access to the Clinch River.

The Clinch Valley Roller Mills and Old Kentucky Turnpike Historic District are listed on the National Register of Historic Places.

The city's major shopping center is Claypool Hill Mall.

== Geography ==
Cedar Bluff is located at 37°5′17″N 81°45′53″W (37.088073, −81.764803).

According to the United States Census Bureau, the town has a total area of 2.3 square miles (5.9 km^{2}), all land.

== Demographics ==
Historical population
Census	Pop.	Note	%±
1920	533		—
1930	590		10.7%
1940	823		39.5%
1950	1,083		31.6%
1960	995		−8.1%
1970	1,050		5.5%
1980	1,550		47.6%
1990	1,290		−16.8%
2000	1,085		−15.9%
2010	1,137		4.8%
2020	1,069		−6.0%
U.S. Decennial Census

As of the census of 2000, there were 1,085 people, 475 households, and 312 families residing in the town. The population density was 473.7 people per square mile (182.9/km^{2}). There were 535 housing units at an average density of 233.6 per square mile (90.2/km^{2}). The racial makeup of the town was 98.99% White, 0.18% Native American, 0.09% Asian, 0.37% from other races, and 0.37% from two or more races. Hispanic or Latino of any race were 0.55% of the population.

There were 475 households, out of which 29.1% had children under the age of 18 living with them, 48.2% were married couples living together, 13.1% had a female householder with no husband present, and 34.3% were non-families. 32.0% of all households were made up of individuals, and 13.9% had someone living alone who was 65 years of age or older. The average household size was 2.28 and the average family size was 2.84.

In the town, the population was spread out, with 22.8% under the age of 18, 7.3% from 18 to 24, 26.8% from 25 to 44, 27.6% from 45 to 64, and 15.5% who were 65 years of age or older. The median age was 40 years. For every 100 females, there were 89.4 males. For every 100 females age 18 and over, there were 82.6 males.

The median income for a household in the town was $26,375, and the median income for a family was $30,357. Males had a median income of $30,982 versus $20,667 for females. The per capita income for the town was $16,664. About 11.9% of families and 14.3% of the population were below the poverty line, including 16.4% of those under age 18 and 23.7% of those age 65 or over.

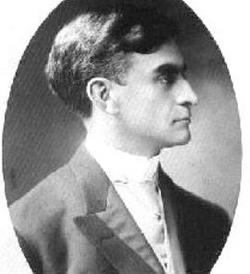
George C. Peery

== Notable people ==
- George C. Peery, former Governor of Virginia
