= Tazewell station =

Tazwell station
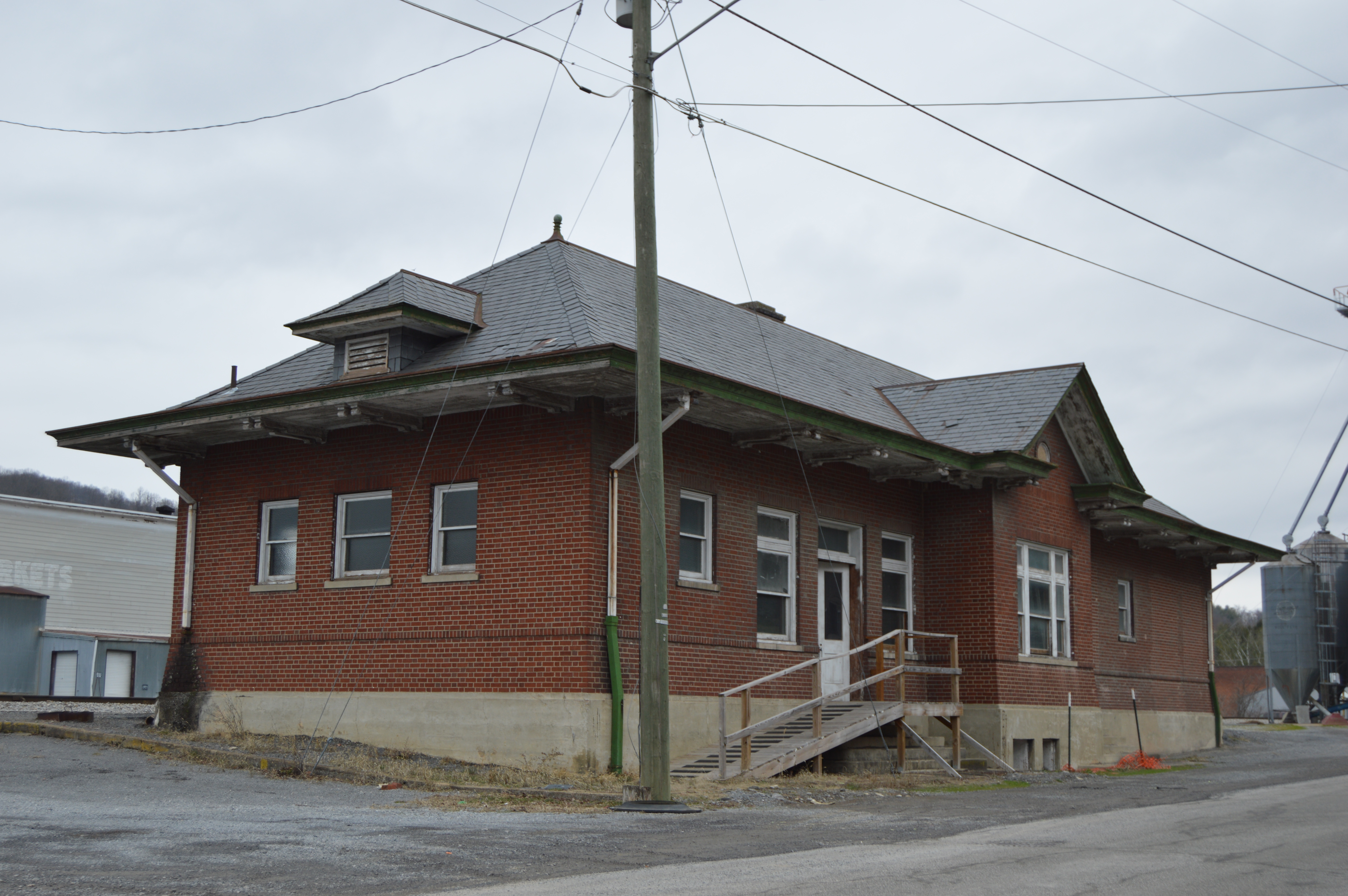
- Front and side of the depot

General information
- Location: 135 Railroad Ave., Tazewell, Virginia, United States
- Coordinates: 37°7′58″N 81°31′35″W
- Owner: Tazewell, Virginia

History
- Opened: 1888
- Rebuilt: 1928

Former services
Preceding station	Norfolk and Western Railway	Following station
Pisgah toward Norton	Norton – Bluefield	Five Oaks toward Bluefield
- Tazewell Depot
- U.S. National Register of Historic Places
- Area: less than one acre
- Built: 1928
- NRHP reference No.: 15000020
- Added to NRHP: February 17, 2015
Location

The Tazewell Depot is a historic railroad station at 135 Railroad Avenue in Tazewell, Virginia. It is a long rectangular brick structure, one story in height, with a hip roof that has broad eaves supported by large brackets. Both the long street-facing and track-facing sides have projecting bay sections. The depot was built in 1888 and rebuilt in 1928 by the Norfolk and Western Railway to serve passenger traffic on its line; the substantial freight volume was handled by a larger adjacent frame building. The town's streetcar system served the station from 1892 to 1933. Passenger service ended about 1957, after which time the depot was also used for freight traffic, which was finally ended in 1974. It is one of two surviving depots that served on the Clinch River Line. The station was restored from 2014 to 2019 for use as a visitor center.

The depot was listed on the National Register of Historic Places in 2015.

== See also ==
- National Register of Historic Places listings in Tazewell County, Virginia
