= Chimney Rock Farm =

Historic house in Virginia, United States

- U.S. National Register of Historic Places
- Virginia Landmarks Register
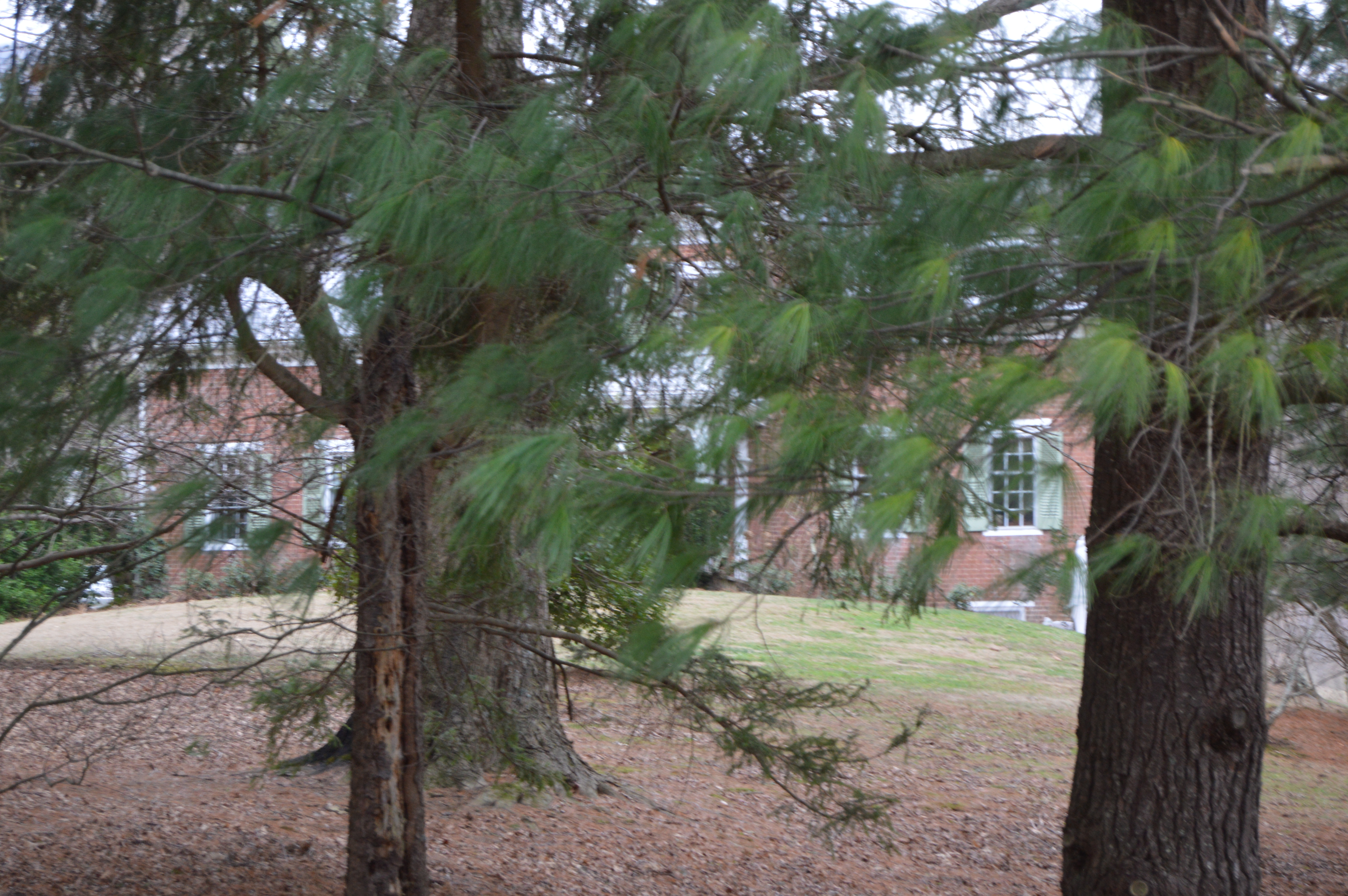
- Roadside view of the farmhouse

- Location within Virginia Location within the United States
- Location: VA 91, near Tazewell, Virginia
- Coordinates: 37°4′39.5″N 81°36′31″W
- Area: 3 acres (1.2 ha)
- Built: c. 1843
- Architectural style: Early Republic, Palladian-type
- NRHP reference No.: 82004607
- VLR No.: 092-0003

Significant dates
- Added to NRHP: July 8, 1982
- Designated VLR: March 13, 1981

Chimney Rock Farm, also known as The Willows, is a historic home located near Tazewell, Tazewell County, Virginia. It was built about 1843, and consists of a pedimented two-story, three-bay, center section flanked by one-story wings in the Palladian style. It is constructed of brick and sits on a high basement.

It was listed on the National Register of Historic Places in 1982.
