= Tazewell Historic District =

Historic district in Virginia, United States

- U.S. National Register of Historic Places
- U.S. Historic district
- Virginia Landmarks Register
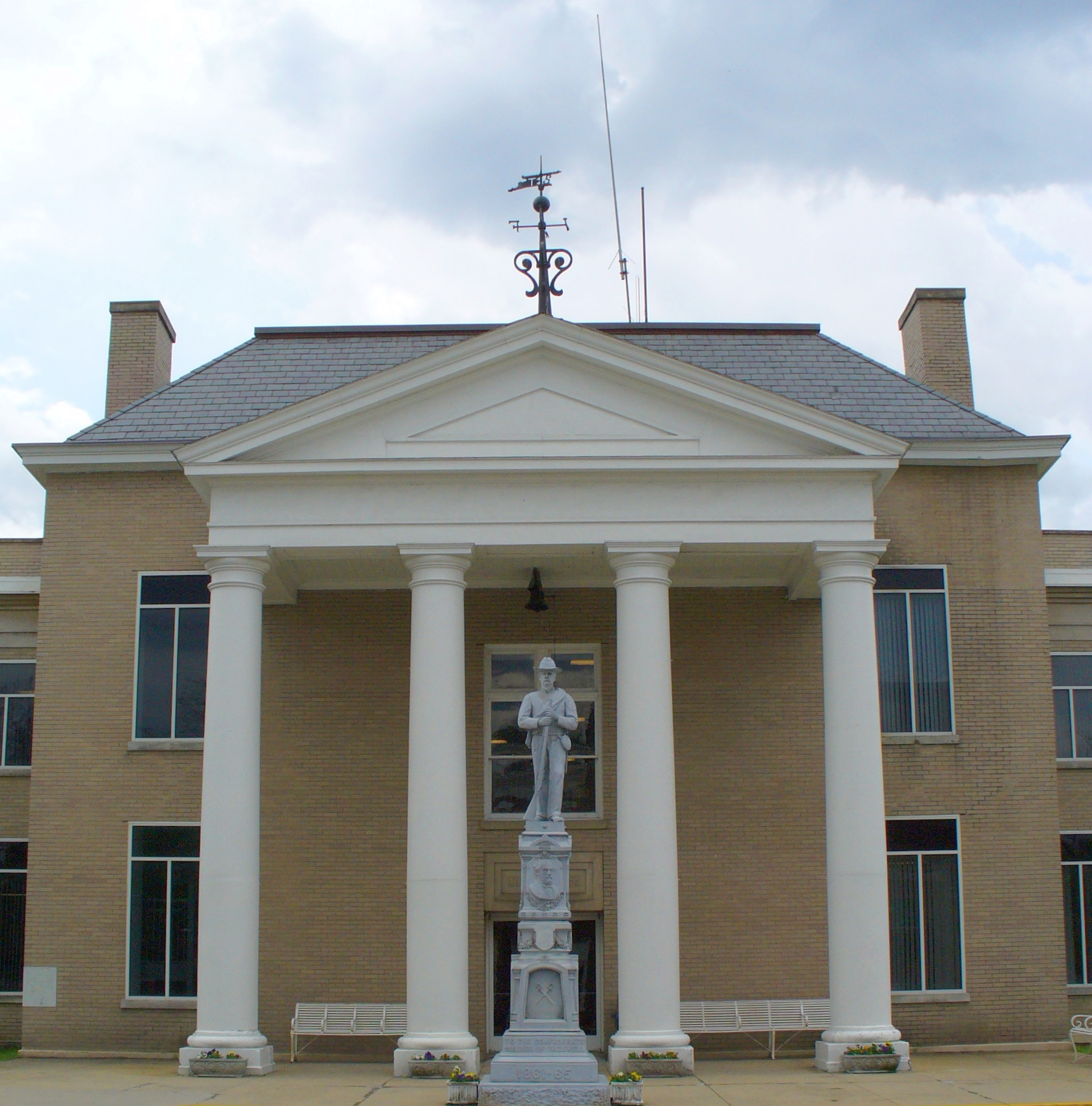
- Tazewell County Courthouse and Civil War Memorial, April 2006

- Location within Virginia Location within the United States
- Interactive map showing the location of Tazewell Historic District
- Location: Main, Church, Tower, and Pine Sts., Central Ave., and Fincastle Turnpike, Tazewell, Virginia
- Coordinates: 37°07′03″N 81°31′15″W
- Built: 1866
- Architect: Pierce, William; Bryan, Andrew J.
- Architectural style: Mid 19th Century Revival, Late Victorian
- NRHP reference No.: 02000519 (original); 16000541 (increase)
- VLR No.: 158-0005

Significant dates
- Added to NRHP: May 16, 2002
- Boundary increase: August 15, 2016
- Designated VLR: December 5, 2001

Tazewell Historic District is a national historic district located at Tazewell, Tazewell County, Virginia. The district encompasses 112 contributing buildings in central business district and surrounding residential area of the town of Tazewell.

The most notable building is the Tazewell County Courthouse. It was built in 1874, and rebuilt in 1913 in a Classical Revival style. Other notable buildings include the Old Jail (c. 1832), Clinch Valley News Building, Stras Memorial Episcopal Church (1884), Tazewell Christian Church (1898), Clinch Valley Bank (1889), J. A. Greever Building (1914), Greever and Gillespie Law Office Building (1897), Tazewell High School (1931), Tazewell Masonic Lodge #62 (1931), Tazewell Post Office (1936), and Tazewell Presbyterian Church (1924, 1959).

It was listed on the National Register of Historic Places in 2002, and had a boundary increase in 2016.
