= Pocahontas Historic District =

Historic district in Virginia, United States

- U.S. National Register of Historic Places
- U.S. Historic district
- Virginia Landmarks Register
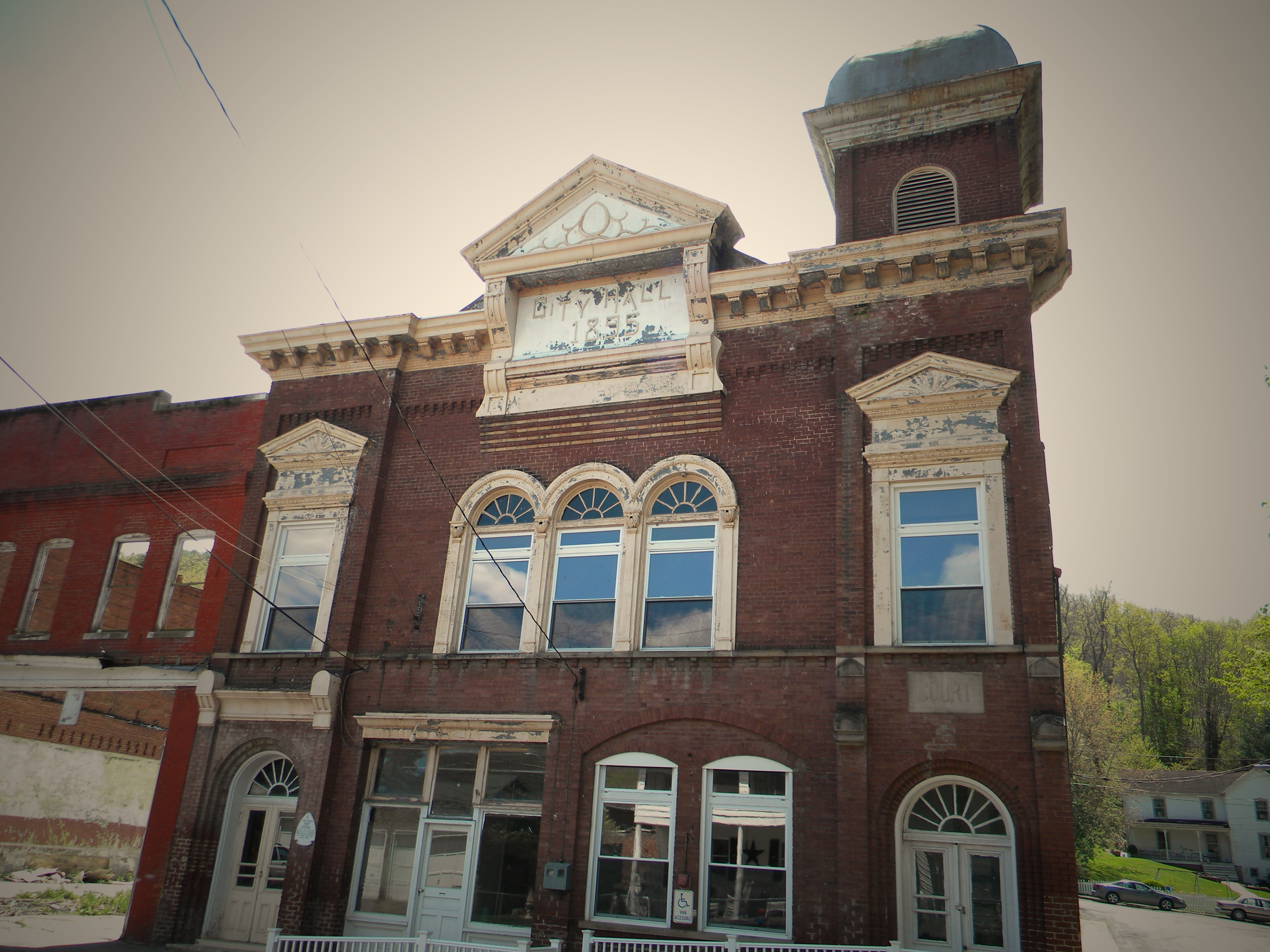

- Location within Virginia Location within the United States
- Location: Corporate boundaries of Pocahontas including cemetery, Pocahontas, Virginia
- Coordinates: 37°18′28″N 81°20′34″W
- Area: 380 acres (150 ha)
- Built: 1881
- Architect: Southwest Virginia Improvement Co.
- Architectural style: Late Victorian
- NRHP reference No.: 72001418
- VLR No.: 092-0011

Significant dates
- Added to NRHP: November 3, 1972
- Designated VLR: March 17, 1972

Pocahontas Historic District is a national historic district located at Pocahontas in the Pocahontas coalfield, Tazewell County, Virginia. It is near Pocahontas Exhibition Coal Mine, a U.S. National Historic Landmark which was Mine No. 1 of the Pocahontas coalfield. The district encompasses 17 contributing buildings and 1 contributing structure in the town of Pocahontas. Notable buildings include the City Hall (1895), the stone Episcopal Methodist Church, Catholic Church, the old brick medical dispensary, a Synagogue, the first millinery shop in the coalfields (now the Emma Yates Memorial Library) and a Masonic Hall.

It was listed on the National Register of Historic Places in 1972.
