= James Wynn House =

Historic house in Virginia, United States

- U.S. National Register of Historic Places
- Virginia Landmarks Register
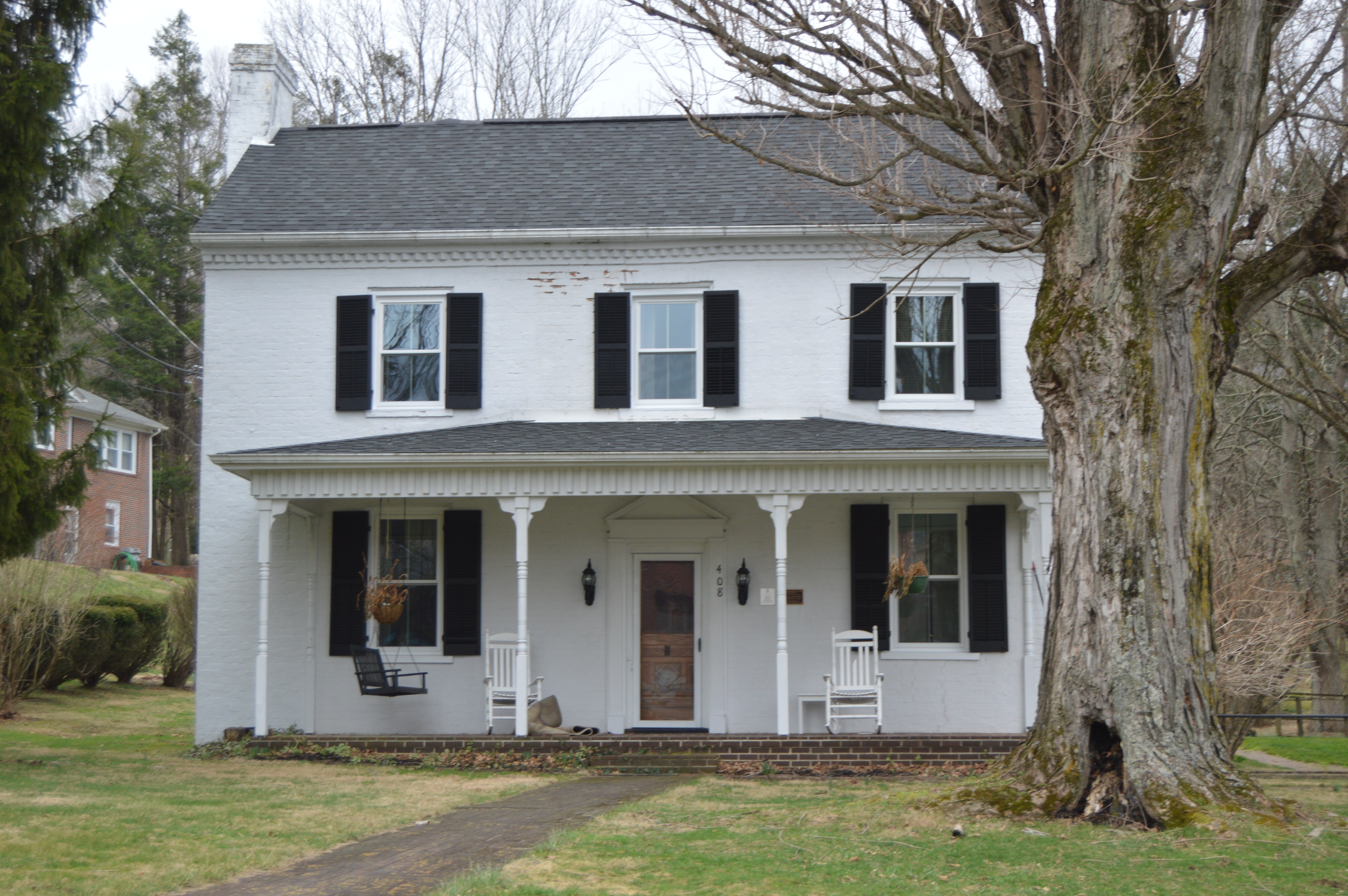
- Front of the house

- Location within Virginia Location within the United States
- Location: 408 S. Elk St., Tazewell, Virginia
- Coordinates: 37°6′52″N 81°31′8″W
- Area: 0.5 acres (0.20 ha)
- Built: 1828
- Architectural style: Federal
- NRHP reference No.: 92001368
- VLR No.: 158-0007

Significant dates
- Added to NRHP: October 28, 1992
- Designated VLR: October 9, 1991

James Wynn House, also known as the Peery House, is a historic home located near Tazewell, Tazewell County, Virginia. It was built about 1828, and is a large two-story, three-bay, brick dwelling with a two-story rear ell. The main block has a gable roof and exterior end chimneys. Across the front facade is a one-story, hip-roofed porch.

It was listed on the National Register of Historic Places in 1992.
