= Bull Thistle Cave Archaeological Site =

- Bull Thistle Cave Archaeological Site (44TZ92)
- U.S. National Register of Historic Places
- Virginia Landmarks Register
- Nearest city: Tazewell, Virginia
- Area: less than one acre
- NRHP reference No.: 87001531
- VLR No.: 092-0022

Significant dates
- Added to NRHP: September 10, 1987
- Designated VLR: March 17, 1987

The Bull Thistle Cave Archaeological Site is an archaeological site on the National Register of Historic Places, located in Tazewell County, Virginia. It is pit cave, used for burial. The distribution of the skeletal remains indicates that bodies were either thrown or lowered into the cave. On the surface of the cave floor, researchers have discovered the remains of a minimum of 11 bodies. Based on an artifact recovered from the site, it is estimated that the cave was used for burials between 1300 and 1600 AD.

It was listed on the National Register of Historic Places in 1987.

== History ==
In the southwestern part of Virginia, there are many burial caves that Native Americans used. The use of mortuary caves dates back to the Late Woodland period, which spans from 900-1600 A.D. These caves were very common in Virginia and more than 50 of the prehistoric caves have been discovered in the region. Many bones found in the mortuary caves have been gnawed on by rodents. This suggests that the Native Americans in the Late Woodland period put the bones on the surface during the burial rather than digging deeper into the earth. There are some hypotheses that, based on the remains, the people might have been on a maize plant diet because their teeth were similar to the southwest Virginia Late Woodland village sites. Scientists want the caves protected in order to prolong the time needed to conduct more tests solving unanswered questions about the artifacts in these caves.

== Discoveries ==
Bull Thistle Archaeological Site was first discovered by cavers in 1985. This was an important discovery because it is one of only two documented burial caves in the area whose bones were undisturbed. Vandalism is very common in the area and Burt Cave and Bull Thistle Cave are the only ones unaffected. In 1986, the University of Tennessee’s Midsouth Anthropological Research Corporation discovered remains of 11 bodies at Bull Thistle Cave. However, the lack of smaller bones may indicate that the cave was a secondary burial site. In other caves, burial methods such as cremations and ossuary-like piles of bones were found. In Bull Thistle Cave, the presence of osteoarthritis and osteophytes were found on several skeletal remains.

== Marginella Burial Cave Project ==
The Marginella Burial Cave Project was started in 1992 by David A. Hubbard and Michael B. Barber. The project was started to accomplish three main objectives. The first was to find more burial caves in the karst region of southwest Virginia. The second was to gauge how much vandalism had affected the remains and whether it would pose a threat in the future. The third, was to find a way to start protecting the caves because vandalism had harmed many of them.

Before the Marginella Burial Cave Project could start collecting artifacts, they needed to submit an analytical research design. There were specific goals detailed in the design. The first was to record the “location and edaphic attributes including geographic setting, elevation, aspect, association with water, drainage, slope, landform, and physiographic province." In addition, the project needed to document the amount of vandalism. Furthermore, the design entailed raising awareness to start a program to preserve the caves. Next, samples of disturbed human skeletal material and disturbed artifacts were collected for scientific study. Finally, the design encouraged public education to enforce efforts to sustain Virginia state burial caves.

== Conservation ==
The Virginia Cave Board is made up of 12 people who strive to uphold the cave’s protections. The 12 members are composed of professionals with different professions; however, they have a common passion of cave conservation. Their two main duties are to advise state agencies relating to cave preservation and educate the public on preservation resources. The board punishes anyone who purposefully harms the caves when they “excavate, remove, destroy, injure, deface, or in any manner disturb any burial grounds, historic or prehistoric resources, archaeological or paleontological site or any part thereof, including relics, inscriptions, saltpeter workings, fossils, bones, remains of historical human activity." While there are strong deterrents, vandalism is common and it is unknown whether the caves will remain preserved for much longer.
