= Pounding Mill, Virginia =

- Census-designated place
- Location within Virginia Location within the United States
- Coordinates: 37°04′31″N 81°42′31″W
- Country: United States
- State: Virginia
- County: Tazewell

Area
  - Total: 2.468 sq mi (6.39 km^{2})
  - Land: 2.432 sq mi (6.30 km^{2})
  - Water: 0.036 sq mi (0.093 km^{2})
- Elevation: 2,231 ft (680 m)

Population (2020)
  - Total: 367
  - Density: 148.7/sq mi (57.4/km^{2})
- Time zone: UTC-5 (Eastern (EST))
  - Summer (DST): UTC-4 (EDT)
- Area code: 276
- GNIS feature ID: 2807449

Pounding Mill is an unincorporated community and census-designated place in Tazewell County, Virginia, United States. As of the 2020 census, Pounding Mill had a population of 367.

Maiden Spring was listed on the National Register of Historic Places in 1994.

== Demographics ==
Historical population
Census	Pop.	Note	%±
U.S. Decennial Census; 2010

Pounding Mill first appeared as a census designated place in the 2020 United States census.
