= Boissevain, Virginia =

- Census-designated place
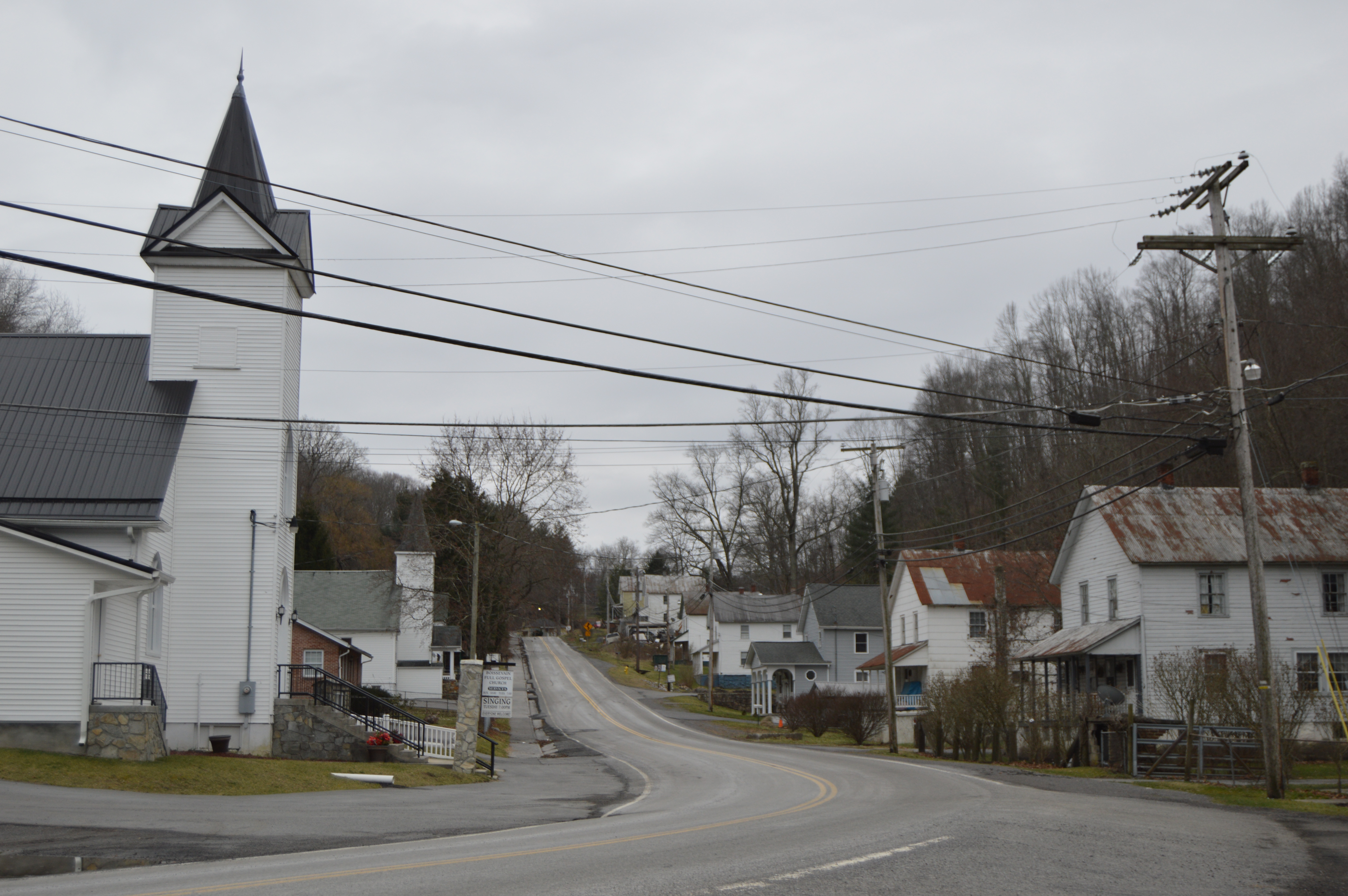
- Boissevain Road

- Location within Virginia Location within the United States
- Coordinates: 37°16′54″N 81°22′49″W
- Country: United States
- State: Virginia
- County: Tazewell
- Elevation: 2,454 ft (748 m)

Population (2020)
  - Total: 457
- Time zone: UTC-5 (Eastern (EST))
  - Summer (DST): UTC-4 (EDT)
- Area code: 276
- GNIS feature ID: 1492603

Boissevain is an unincorporated community, census-designated place (CDP), and former coal town in Tazewell County, Virginia, United States. It was defined as a census-designated place (then termed an unincorporated place) at the 1950 United States census under the spelling Boissevaine, when it had a population of 1,197. It did not reappear again as a CDP until the 2020 census with a population of 457.

In February 1932, 38 men lost their lives in a coal mine explosion.

Boissevain is served by the Abbs Valley -Boissevain - Pocahontas Rescue Squad Inc - Rescue 945 for Emergency Medical Services.

== Demographics ==
Historical population
Census	Pop.	Note	%±
1950	1,197		—
2020	457		—
U.S. Decennial Census; 1940 1950 1960 1970; 1980 1990 2000 2010

Boissevain first appeared as an unincorporated community in the 1950 U.S. census. It did not appear in subsequent censuses until it was listed a census designated place in the 2020 U.S. census.

Boissevain CDP, Virginia – Racial and ethnic composition Note: the US Census treats Hispanic/Latino as an ethnic category. This table excludes Latinos from the racial categories and assigns them to a separate category. Hispanics/Latinos may be of any race.
Race / Ethnicity (NH = Non-Hispanic)	Pop 2020	2020
White alone (NH)	422	92.34%
Black or African American alone (NH)	10	2.19%
Native American or Alaska Native alone (NH)	0	0.00%
Asian alone (NH)	0	0.00%
Native Hawaiian or Pacific Islander alone (NH)	0	0.00%
Other race alone (NH)	1	0.22%
Mixed race or Multiracial (NH)	23	5.03%
Hispanic or Latino (any race)	1	0.22%
Total	457	100.00%
