= Maiden Spring =

Historic house in Virginia, United States

- U.S. National Register of Historic Places
- U.S. Historic district
- Virginia Landmarks Register
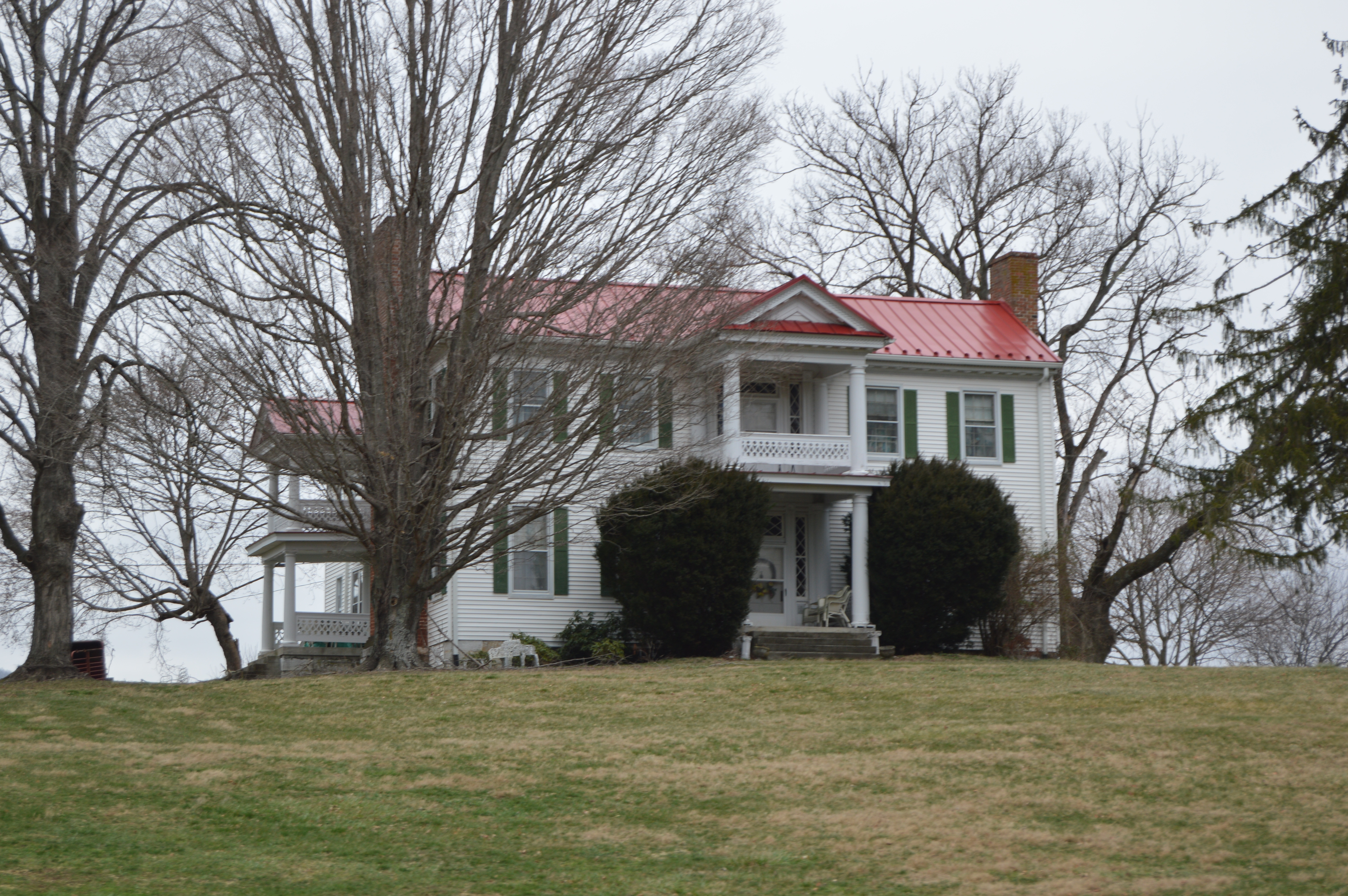
- Front of the farmhouse

- Location within Virginia Location within the United States
- Location: Jct. of VA 609 and VA 91, Pounding Mill, Virginia
- Coordinates: 37°1′48″N 81°41′1″W
- Area: 600 acres (240 ha)
- Built: 1769, 1838
- Architectural style: Central-passage plan
- NRHP reference No.: 94000987
- VLR No.: 092-0002

Significant dates
- Added to NRHP: August 16, 1994
- Designated VLR: June 15, 1994

Maiden Spring is a historic home and farm complex and national historic district located at Pounding Mill, Tazewell County, Virginia. The district encompasses eight contributing buildings, two contributing sites, and one contributing structure. The main house consists of a large two-story, five-bay, frame, central-passage-plan dwelling with an earlier frame dwelling (c. 1772), incorporated as an ell. Also on the property are the contributing meat house, slave house, summer kitchen, horse barn, the stock barn, the hen house, the granary / corn crib, the source of Maiden Spring, the cemetery, and the schoolhouse. It was the home of 19th-century congressman, magistrate and judge Rees Bowen (1809–1879) and his son, Henry (1841–1915), also a congressman. During the American Civil War, Confederate Army troops camped on the Maiden Spring Farm.

It was listed on the National Register of Historic Places in 1994.
