= Tazewell, Virginia =

- Town
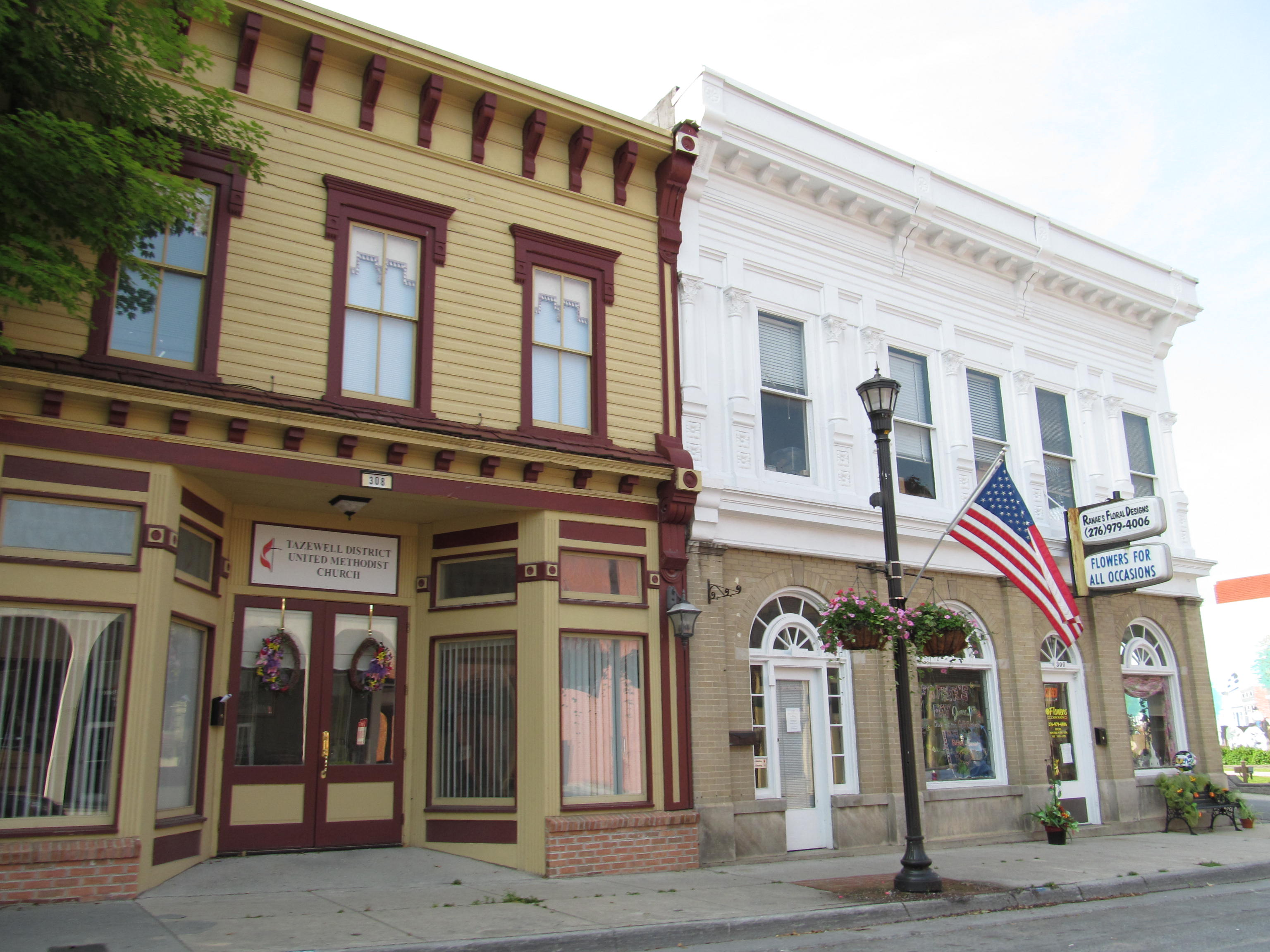
- Downtown, 2012

- Seal

- Location within Virginia Location within the United States
- Coordinates: 37°7′37″N 81°31′10″W
- Country: United States
- State: Virginia
- County: Tazewell
- Incorporated: 1800

Government
  - Mayor: Joseph R. Beasley

Area
  - Total: 6.95 sq mi (18.00 km^{2})
  - Land: 6.87 sq mi (17.79 km^{2})
  - Water: 0.081 sq mi (0.21 km^{2})
- Elevation: 2,503 ft (763 m)

Population (2020)
  - Total: 4,486
  - Density: 603.0/sq mi (232.81/km^{2})
- U.S. Census Bureau, 2010 Population Estimates
- Time zone: UTC−5 (EST)
  - Summer (DST): UTC−4 (EDT)
- ZIP codes: 24608, 24651
- Area code: 276
- FIPS code: 51-77792
- GNIS feature ID: 1498543
- Website: www.townoftazewell.org

Tazewell (/ˈtæzwɛl/) is a town in Tazewell County, Virginia, United States. As of the 2020 census, Tazewell had a population of 4,486. It is part of the Bluefield micropolitan area, which has a population of 107,578. It is the county seat of Tazewell County.

== History ==
Named Jeffersonville until 1892, Tazewell developed near the headwaters of the Clinch River.

Tazewell is in a county that underwent rapid growth in population at the end of the 19th century during the coal and iron boom, as resources of the Pocahontas Coalfields were exploited.

The Big Crab Orchard Site, Bull Thistle Cave Archeological Site, Burke's Garden Rural Historic District, Chimney Rock Farm, Tazewell Historic District, George Oscar Thompson House (now demolished), and James Wynn House are listed on the National Register of Historic Places.

=== Tazewell trolley ===
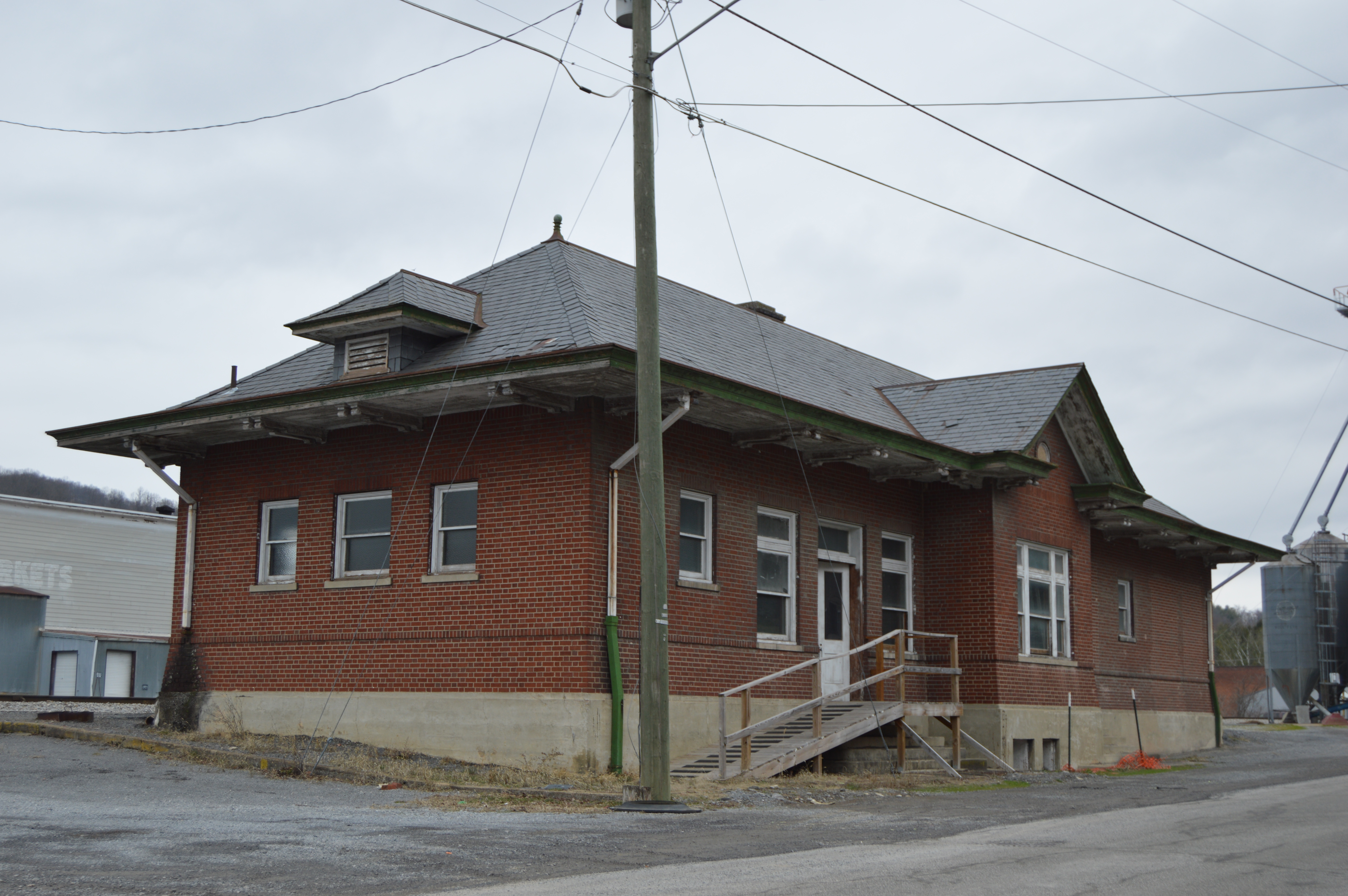
The structure of Tazewell Depot which was served by the Norfolk and Western Railway from 1928 to 1974

Tazewell is said to be one of the smallest towns in the United States to have once operated a streetcar.

The trolley operated from Tazewell station and industrial complexes in North Tazewell to downtown along Main Street and its lining government buildings, hotels, restaurants, and other businesses. Chartered as the Tazewell Railway and Light Company, it started operations in 1892 as a horsecar and it was electrified in 1904. The fare was five cents. By 1920, the streetcar was competing with automobiles and it closed in 1933.

== Geography ==
Tazewell is located at 37°07′37″N 81°31′10″W (37.126938, −81.519455).

According to the United States Census Bureau, the town has a total area of 4.0 square miles (10.5 km^{2}), all land.

A 32-mile stretch of Virginia State Highway 16 is known locally as the Back of the Dragon because of the hundreds of sharp rising and lowering turns between Hungry Mother State Park and Tazewell. The section of highway is popular with motorcycle enthusiasts and sports car aficionados.

== Climate ==
The climate in this area has mild differences between highs and lows, and there is adequate rainfall year-round. According to the Köppen Climate Classification system, Tazewell has a marine west coast climate, abbreviated "Cfb" on climate maps.

== Demographics ==
Historical population
| Census | Pop. | Note | %± |
|---|---|---|---|
| 1880 | 508 | | — |
| 1890 | 604 | | 18.9% |
| 1900 | 1,096 | | 81.5% |
| 1910 | 1,230 | | 12.2% |
| 1920 | 1,261 | | 2.5% |
| 1930 | 1,211 | | −4.0% |
| 1940 | 1,374 | | 13.5% |
| 1950 | 1,347 | | −2.0% |
| 1960 | 3,000 | | 122.7% |
| 1970 | 4,168 | | 38.9% |
| 1980 | 4,468 | | 7.2% |
| 1990 | 4,176 | | −6.5% |
| 2000 | 4,206 | | 0.7% |
| 2010 | 4,627 | | 10.0% |
| 2020 | 4,486 | | −3.0% |
U.S. Decennial Census

=== 2020 census ===
As of the 2020 census, Tazewell had a population of 4,486. The median age was 45.8 years. 19.1% of residents were under the age of 18 and 24.7% of residents were 65 years of age or older. For every 100 females there were 87.3 males, and for every 100 females age 18 and over there were 82.3 males age 18 and over.

95.0% of residents lived in urban areas, while 5.0% lived in rural areas.

There were 1,866 households in Tazewell, of which 26.7% had children under the age of 18 living in them. Of all households, 39.4% were married-couple households, 17.7% were households with a male householder and no spouse or partner present, and 37.7% were households with a female householder and no spouse or partner present. About 34.5% of all households were made up of individuals and 16.8% had someone living alone who was 65 years of age or older.

There were 2,154 housing units, of which 13.4% were vacant. The homeowner vacancy rate was 4.4% and the rental vacancy rate was 7.3%.

Racial composition as of the 2020 census
| Race | Number | Percent |
|---|---|---|
| White | 4,015 | 89.5% |
| Black or African American | 212 | 4.7% |
| American Indian and Alaska Native | 8 | 0.2% |
| Asian | 26 | 0.6% |
| Native Hawaiian and Other Pacific Islander | 0 | 0.0% |
| Some other race | 19 | 0.4% |
| Two or more races | 206 | 4.6% |
| Hispanic or Latino (of any race) | 56 | 1.2% |

=== 2000 census ===
As of the 2000 census, there were 4,206 people, 1,650 households, and 1,098 families living in the town. The population density was 1,040.1 people per square mile (402.0/km^{2}). There were 1,804 housing units at an average density of 446.1 per square mile (172.4/km^{2}). The racial makeup of the town was 88.78% White, 9.32% African American, 0.17% Native American, 0.52% Asian, 0.36% from other races, and 0.86% from two or more races. Hispanic or Latino of any race were 0.62% of the population.

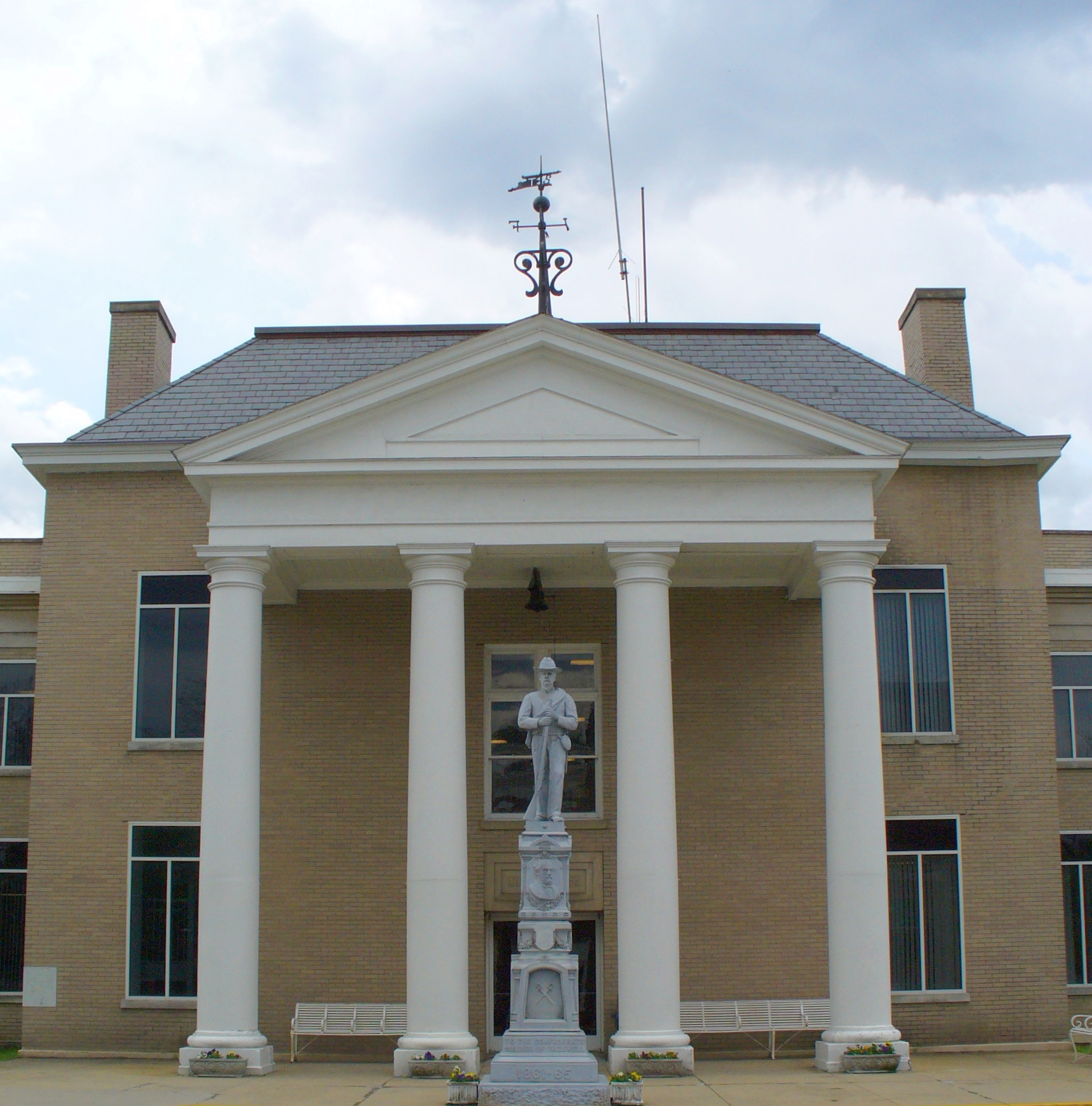
Tazewell County Courthouse and Confederate Memorial in Tazewell, Virginia

There were 1,650 households, out of which 26.1% had children under the age of 18 living with them, 51.7% were married couples living together, 11.8% had a female householder with no husband present, and 33.4% were non-families. 31.2% of all households were made up of individuals, and 15.6% had someone living alone who was 65 years of age or older. The average household size was 2.25 and the average family size was 2.81.

In the town, the population was spread out, with 18.6% under the age of 18, 8.1% from 18 to 24, 26.3% from 25 to 44, 25.3% from 45 to 64, and 21.7% who were 65 years of age or older. The median age was 43 years. For every 100 females, there were 92.1 males. For every 100 females aged 18 and over, there were 87.3 males.

The median income for a household in the town was $28,510, and the median income for a family was $37,792. Males had a median income of $35,912 versus $22,664 for females. The per capita income for the town was $15,468. About 11.6% of families and 20.6% of the population were below the poverty line, including 20.7% of those under age 18 and 27.8% of those age 65 or over.

== Infrastructure ==
=== Healthcare ===
Carilion Tazewell Community Hospital is a 56 licensed bed acute care facility that provides general medical care.

Tazewell Community Health Center is a Southwest Virginia Community Health Systems-run clinic.

== Notable people ==
- William Gibbony Baldwin, co-founder of the Baldwin-Felts Detective Agency.
- George W. L. Bickley - physician, founder of the Knights of the Golden Circle
- Emilee Hackney - writer, whose debut memoir All That's Unseen described her life growing up in Tazewell
- Kathryn Harrold – television and movie actress
- Betony Vernon - American jewelry designer based in Paris
- Billy Wagner - MLB Baseball player and member of the National Baseball Hall of Fame
- Fred M. Wilcox – director of the film Forbidden Planet
