= Pocahontas, Virginia =

- Town
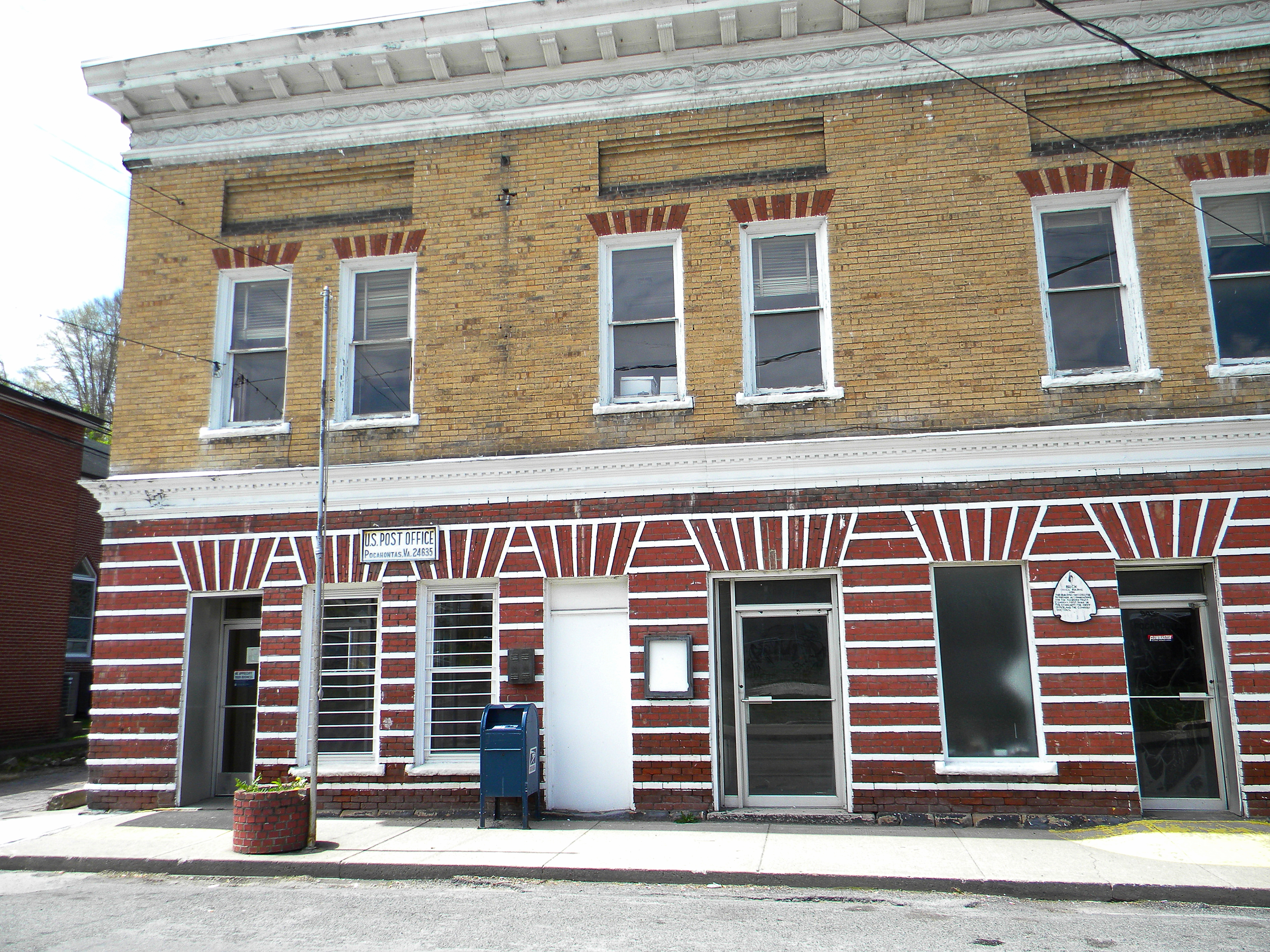
- Pocahontas, Virginia Post Office

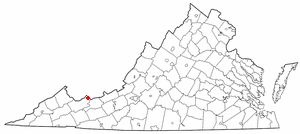
- Location of Pocahontas, Virginia
- Coordinates: 37°18′18″N 81°20′23″W
- Country: United States
- State: Virginia
- County: Tazewell

Government
  - Mayor: Benjamin Gibson

Area
  - Total: 0.58 sq mi (1.50 km^{2})
  - Land: 0.57 sq mi (1.48 km^{2})
  - Water: 0.012 sq mi (0.03 km^{2})
- Elevation: 2,330 ft (710 m)

Population (2020)
  - Total: 268
  - Estimate (2019): 353
  - Density: 619.4/sq mi (239.14/km^{2})
- Time zone: UTC−5 (Eastern (EST))
  - Summer (DST): UTC−4 (EDT)
- ZIP code: 24635
- Area code: 276
- FIPS code: 51-63288
- GNIS feature ID: 1493440
- Website: pocahontasva.org

Pocahontas is a town in Tazewell County, Virginia, United States. It was named for Chief Powhatan's daughter, Pocahontas, who lived in the 17th-century Jamestown Settlement. The town was founded as a company mining town by the Southwest Virginia Improvement Company in 1881. It was the first company mining town in Virginia. The post office opened on June 30, 1882.

Its population was 268 at the 2020 census. It is part of the Bluefield, WV-VA micropolitan area, which has a population of 106,363.

== History ==
Coal was known to exist in the western part of Virginia as early as 1750 when explorer Dr. Thomas Walker observed coal outcrops on Flat Top Mountain in western Virginia. His findings went largely unnoticed for nearly 125 years. In 1861, Confederate Major Jedediah "Jed." Hotchkiss observed the same outcrops while he was a topographical engineer for General Robert E. Lee. In 1873, he hired Isiah Arnold Welch to survey timber and coal in the Flat Top Mountain area. Welch's survey began at the residence of Jordan Nelson, a local blacksmith. In addition to using the coal from a large outcropping on his property, he sold it to people who came to purchase it by the bushel. Locals feared that actively mining the coal would deplete it. When the mine closed in 1955, after 73 years of continuous production, over 44 million tons had been shipped from the mine.

The depression of 1873 delayed further development until 1881. Hotchkiss, an advocate of Virginia industrialism, urged Frederick J. Kimball, a partner in the Philadelphia investment firm that established the Norfolk and Western Railroad (and later the railroad's president) to extend the railroad from the New River Depot near Radford, Virginia to the coal fields of Southwest Virginia and Southern West Virginia. The firm financed both the railroad's extension and the Southwest Virginia Improvement Company.

The railroad extension was established in 1881 by The Southwest Virginia Improvement Company under the direction of Mine Superintendent William Arthur Lathrop and architect Charles W. Bolton. At this time, the railroad line of Norfolk & Western was still about 50 miles away from the town. 200 Hungarian, Swedish and German immigrant workers, recruited from Castle Garden, New York, arrived in January 1882. They and native workers from Virginia, North Carolina and West Virginia lived in tents set up among the cleared laurel thickets of Powell's Bottom, which became the town's location.

On June 30, 1882, Powell's Bottom officially became Pocahontas when the post office was established with William A. Lathrop its first postmaster. The first house, finished in October 1882 at 181 W. Water St., is still standing and is a private residence as of October 2022. The railroad arrived in March 1883. The first carload (of coal) was used as fuel for the N&W railroad and shipped on March 12, 1883. The Virginia Legislature granted a charter for the town on January 31, 1884.

The railroad line constructed to Pocahontas helped start the region's coal boom in the late 19th century. The Norfolk and Western Railroad (reorganized as the Norfolk and Western Railway in 1896) (now Norfolk Southern) became nationally prominent during the 1880s primarily due to hauling the coal from the Pocahontas-Flat Top coal region. The Pocahontas large, two-state coal region was named after this town. The town reached its peak of population in 1920 and has declined markedly since 1960.

The Virginia Department of Housing and Community Development gave the town a $1,000,000 grant to help fund their downtown revitalization. In 2012, a lawsuit was filed on behalf of Historic Pocahontas to preserve buildings slated for demolition and redevelop them instead. The lawsuit stopped the revitalization project, which was never completed. In 2016, the lawsuit was dismissed, as one of the historic buildings was deemed unsafe after much of it had caved in.

== Geography ==
According to the United States Census Bureau, the town has a total area of 0.6 square mile (1.6 km^{2}), all land.

== Demographics ==
Historical population
Census	Pop.	Note	%±
1890	2,953		—
1900	2,789		−5.6%
1910	3,561		27.7%
1920	3,775		6.0%
1930	2,293		−39.3%
1940	2,673		16.6%
1950	2,410		−9.8%
1960	1,313		−45.5%
1970	891		−32.1%
1980	703		−21.1%
1990	513		−27.0%
2000	441		−14.0%
2010	389		−11.8%
2020	268		−31.1%
2021 (est.)	264		−1.5%

As of the census of 2000, there were 441 people, 190 households, and 122 families residing in the town. The population density was 729.1 people per square mile (283.8/km^{2}). There were 230 housing units at an average density of 380.3 per square mile (148.0/km^{2}). The racial makeup of the town was 96.15% White, 2.04% African American, 0.23% Native American, 0.91% from other races, and 0.68% from two or more races. Hispanic or Latino people of any race were 1.81% of the population.

There were 190 households, out of which 27.9% had children under the age of 18 living with them, 45.3% were married couples living together, 16.8% had a female householder with no husband present, and 35.3% were non-families. 32.6% of all households were made up of individuals, and 14.7% had someone living alone who was 65 years of age or older. The average household size was 2.32 and the average family size was 2.98.

In the town, the population was spread out, with 24.7% under the age of 18, 8.6% from 18 to 24, 21.1% from 25 to 44, 27.7% from 45 to 64, and 17.9% who were 65 years of age or older. The median age was 41 years. For every 100 females, there were 89.3 males. For every 100 females aged 18 and over, there were 82.4 males.

The median income for a household in the town was $22,917, and the median income for a family was $30,357. Males had a median income of $22,232 versus $17,321 for females. The per capita income for the town was $12,124. About 19.8% of families and 17.9% of the population were below the poverty line, including 18.4% of those under age 18 and 10.3% of those age 65 or over.

== Economy ==
The Pocahontas State Correctional Center opened in 2007; the medium-security prison can house around 1,000 inmates.

== Arts and culture ==
The Pocahontas Historic District and Pocahontas Mine No. 1 are listed on the National Register of Historic Places.

=== Points of interest ===
Pocahontas owns and operates the Pocahontas Exhibition Mine and Museum, a National Historic Landmark and Virginia's official "coal heritage zone." The "show mine" features tours into the historic mine that first extracted Pocahontas #3 coal. This was used to heat homes across the United States and was the chosen fuel of the United States Navy. The exhibition mine features a 13-foot-tall (4.0 m) coal seam, museum, education center, and restaurant. The museum created 16 new jobs and had over 3,500 visitors in 2021.

The Pocahontas Cemetery contains the side-by-side graves of 144 miners killed in a mine explosion in Pocahontas in 1884. A memorial for the victims is held each April.

St. Elizabeth's Roman Catholic Church, built by Hungarian immigrants who came to work in the coal mines, features ten life-sized murals on the ceiling and walls. The church holds an annual Hungarian cabbage roll dinner to honor the European heritage of workers in the coalfields.

=== Festivals ===
The Pocahontas Indian Run occurs each April and includes a memorial at the Pocahontas Cemetery for the miners killed in the 1884 mine explosion.

Events in June include a car show and flea market, and the Pocahontas Bluegrass Festival.

Independence Day celebrations in July include fireworks, a street dance, bands, and food.

Each Labor Day, Pocahontas hosts the Coal Miners Reunion, where retired coal miners and railroad workers from across the State are honored with a parade and luncheon.

The Peeled Chestnut Mountain Pumpkin Festival occurs each October.

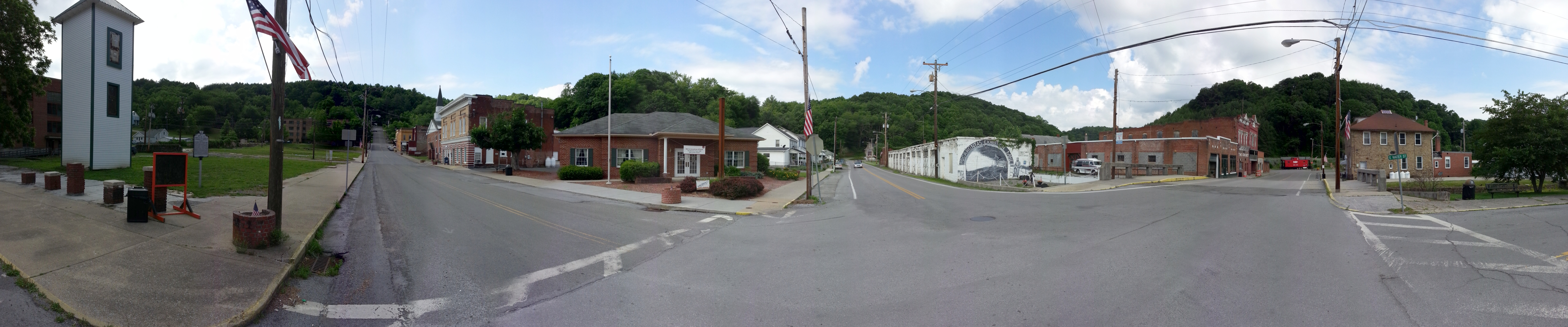
Pocahontas in 2014

== Government ==
The Town of Pocahontas has a mayor/council form of government. The mayor is elected and serves as the Town Manager. The current mayor is Benjamin A Gibson.

In 2006, the town elected an all-female administration.

== Parks and recreation ==
The Pocahontas ATV Spearhead Trail System was opened in 2014, and will be connected to the Hatfield and McCoy trail system in West Virginia. It has provided an economic boost for the small town. There are cabin rental companies that host ATV riders in the area. Several bed and breakfasts have also opened.

The Virginia Department of Transportation awarded the town funding to complete a walking trail which links the Pocahontas Exhibition Coal Mine to the Laurel Meadows Park.

== Media ==
Pocahontas was the setting and filming location of the 1992 film, The Turning.

== Infrastructure ==
Pocahontas operates a water treatment plant and distribution system for the town and surrounding communities in both Virginia and West Virginia. In 2009 and 2013, the town was awarded a Bronze Water Performance Award from the Virginia Department of Health for excellence in granular media filtration. In 2011, the West Virginia Department of Health recognized the town for efforts taken to protect its source water and safeguard the public.

== Notable people ==
- Herman Branson, physicist
- Margaret E. Morton, politician
- Frank Oceak, professional baseball player and coach
- Frank Soos, author
- Zollie Toth, professional football player
- Teddy Weatherford, jazz pianist
