= Clinch Valley Roller Mills =

- U.S. National Register of Historic Places
- Virginia Landmarks Register
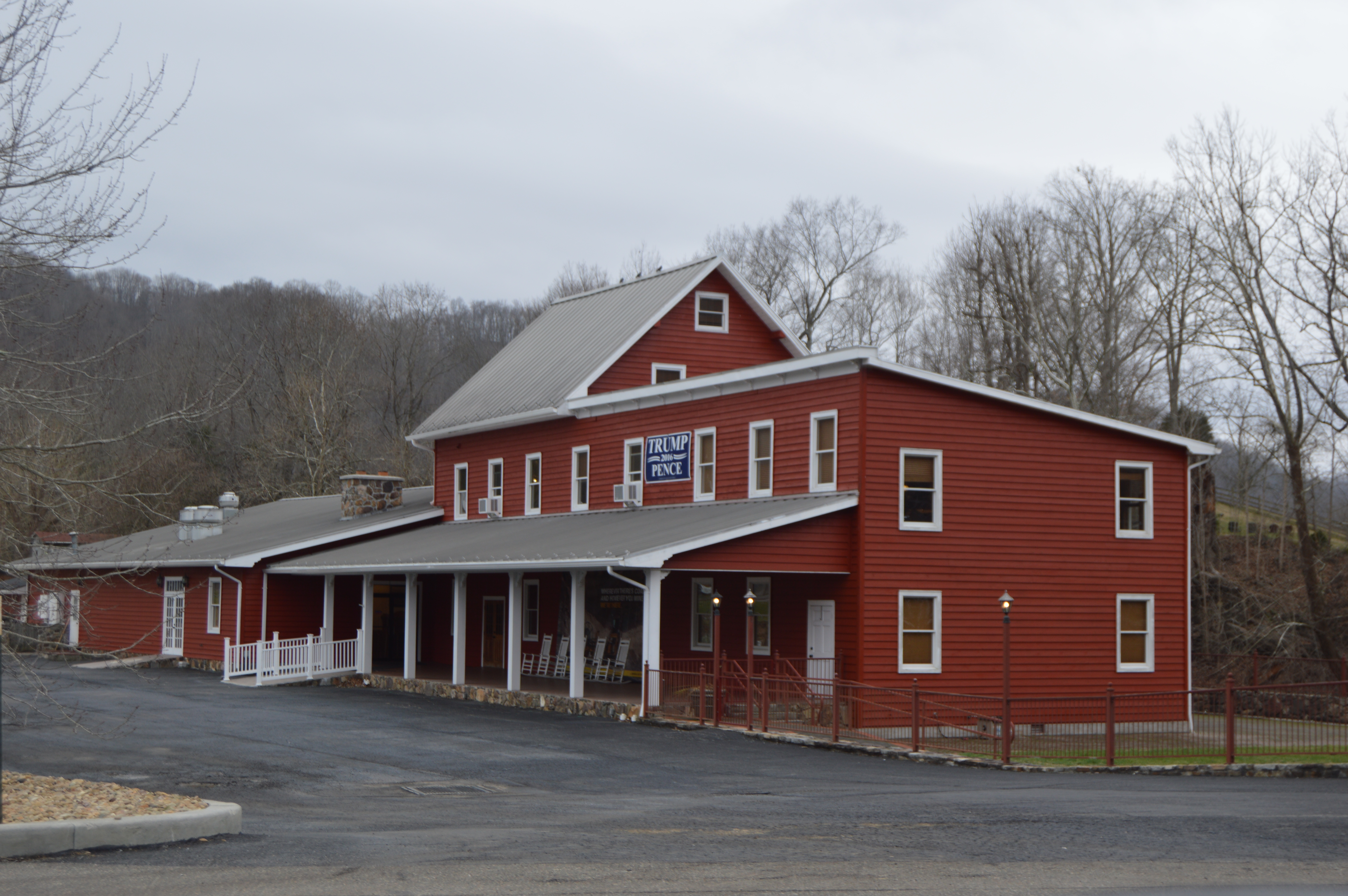
- Overview from east

- Location within Virginia Location within the United States
- Location: River Street Dr., Cedar Bluff, Virginia
- Coordinates: 37°5′18″N 81°45′58″W
- Area: less than one acre
- Built: c. 1856
- NRHP reference No.: 84000056
- VLR No.: 184-0001-0049

Significant dates
- Added to NRHP: October 4, 1984
- Designated VLR: August 21, 1984

Clinch Valley Roller Mills is a historic grist mill complex located along the Clinch River at Cedar Bluff, Tazewell County, Virginia. The main building was built about 1856, and consists of a 3 1/2-story, timber frame cinder block with later 19th and early-20th century additions. There are additions for grain storage; a saw mill, now enclosed and housing the mill office; the mill dam site with its associated culvert, weirs, flume and turbines; and the 1 1/2-story shop building. The main section is believed to have been rebuilt after a fire in 1884.

It was listed on the National Register of Historic Places in 1984.
