= Virginia State Route 67 =

State highway in western Virginia, US

State Route 67

Route information
- Maintained by VDOT
- Length: 22.36 mi (35.98 km)
- Existed: 1940–present
- Tourist routes: Virginia Byway

Major junctions
- South end: SR 80 near Honaker
- US 460 in Richlands
- North end: SR 616 at Jewell Ridge

Location
- Country: United States
- State: Virginia
- Counties: Russell, Tazewell

Highway system
- Virginia Routes; Interstate; US; Primary; Secondary; Byways; History; HOT lanes
← I-66	→ SR 68

State Route 67 (SR 67) is a primary state highway in the southwest part of the U.S. state of Virginia. It runs from SR 80 near Honaker east to U.S. Route 460 (US 460) at Raven, east concurrently with US 460 and US 460 Business (US 460 Bus.) into downtown Richlands, and north to SR 616 at Jewell Ridge on the Tazewell–Buchanan county line.

== Route description ==
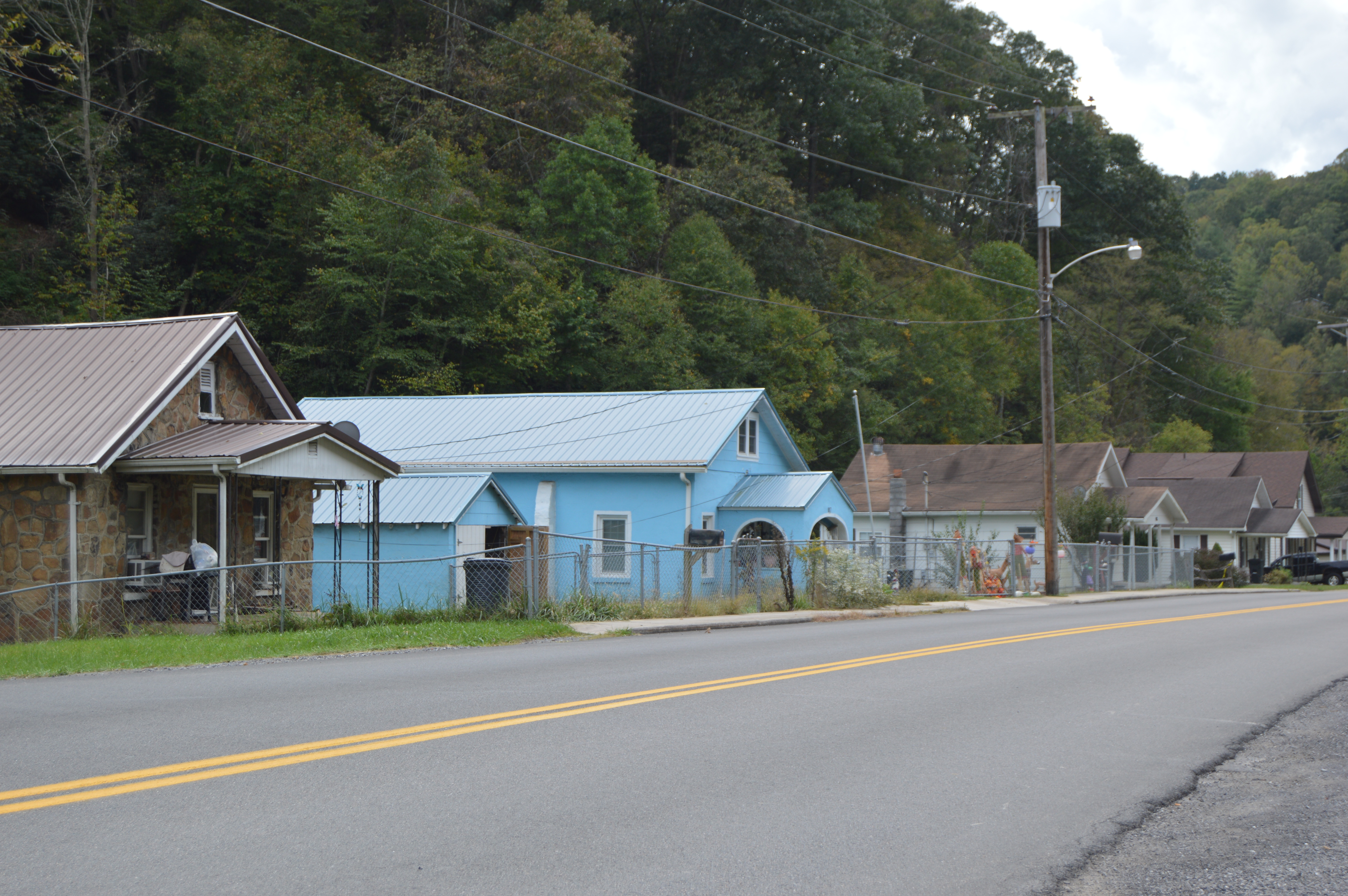
Along SR 67 in Richlands

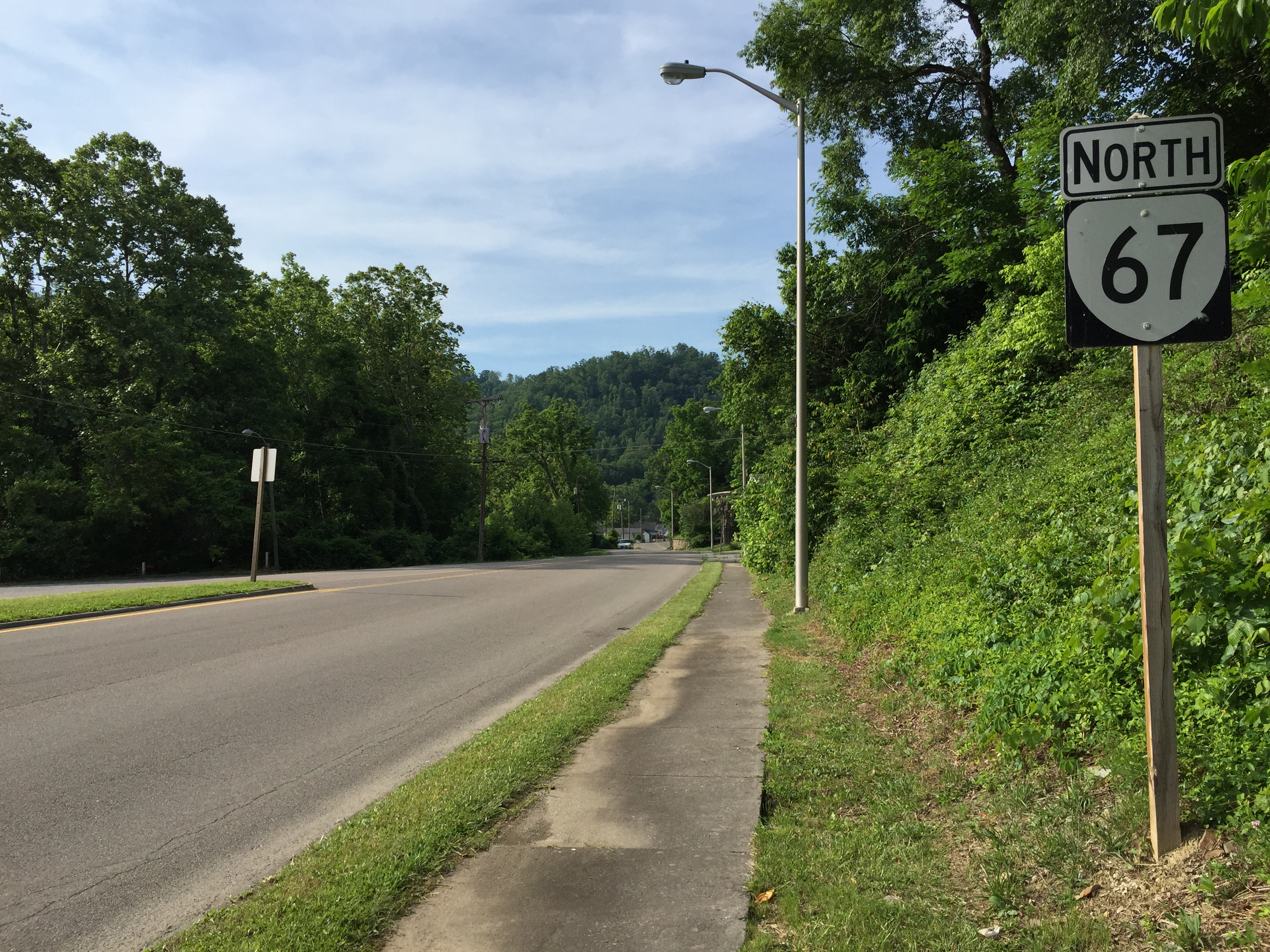
View north along SR 67 in Richlands

SR 67 begins at SR 80 east of Honaker in Russell County. From there, it heads in a generally northeasterly direction to the Clinch River at Gardner. SR 67 follows the Clinch River to the settlement of Swords Creek and then heads north next to Swords Creek to Dye. It curved gradually east along a smaller creek, crosses a summit, and runs alongside other creeks to the county line at West Raven.

Upon entering Tazewell County, SR 67 again parallels the Clinch River at Raven, following an old alignment of US 460 to Doran. It then heads east on US 460 and US 460 Bus into downtown Richlands. SR 67 leaves Richlands to the north, running alongside Big Creek past Seaboard and Coaldan to near Jewell Ridge, rising onto Smith Ridge (the Tennessee Valley Divide), and ending at SR 616 at the Buchanan County line. SR 616 runs along the county line at the top of the ridge.

== History ==
An initial 0.89 miles (1.43 km) piece north from SR 126 (now US 460 Business) in Richlands was added to the state highway system in 1931 as State Route 138, and a further 4.11 miles (6.61 km) was added in 1932. The road was renumbered State Route 83 in the 1933 renumbering, and the rest of current SR 67 was numbered State Route 619. In 1937, the road north to Jewell Ridge was transferred to the primary system.

On the other side, the road from SR 111 (now SR 80) east for 5.52 miles (8.88 km) was added in 1932, and in the 1933 renumbering it was also numbered SR 83. An extension to the east for 3.76 miles (6.05 km) was added in 1934, and the rest of the road east to SR 84 (now US 460) was numbered State Route 617. The gap in SR 83 was filled in 1938, transferring some of SR 617 to the primary system. (A short piece of SR 617 from SR 83 to SR 632 remains, as does a much larger piece of Tazewell County's SR 617.)

In the 1940 renumbering, SR 83 was renumbered SR 67, as the number 83 was needed for its current alignment, matching West Virginia Route 83.

== Major intersections ==
County	Location	mi	km	Destinations	Notes
Russell	Honaker	0.00	0.00	SR 80 (Redbud Highway) – Rosedale, Honaker	Southern terminus
Tazewell	Raven			SR 806 (Raven Road) to US 460 west – Grundy	
Tazewell	Raven	12.05	19.39	US 460 west (Governor G.C. Peery Highway) – Grundy	Southern end of US 460 concurrency
Tazewell	Richlands	13.43	21.61	US 460 east (Governor G.C. Peery Highway) – Claypool Hill	Northern end of US 460 concurrency; southern end of US 460 Bus. concurrency
Tazewell	Richlands	14.32– 14.41	23.05– 23.19	US 460 Bus. east (Front Street)	Northern end of US 460 Bus. concurrency; US 460 Bus. on one-way pair
Tazewell	Richlands	14.82	23.85	US 460 – Grundy, Claypool Hill	Interchange; exit 2 (US 460)
Tazewell–Buchanan county line	Jewell Ridge	22.36	35.98	SR 616 (Smith Ridge Road)	Northern terminus
1.000 mi = 1.609 km; 1.000 km = 0.621 mi: Concurrency terminus

< SR 137	District 1 State Routes; 1928–1933	SR 139 >
