= Virginia State Route 16 =

State highway in western Virginia, US

State Route 16

Route information
- Maintained by VDOT
- Length: 77.58 mi (124.85 km)
- Existed: 1940–present
- Tourist routes: Virginia Byway

Major junctions
- South end: NC 16 near Jefferson, NC
- US 58 in Mouth of Wilson; I-81 / US 11 in Marion; US 19 / US 460 in Tazewell
- North end: WV 16 near Bishop, WV

Location
- Country: United States
- State: Virginia
- Counties: Grayson, Smyth, Tazewell

Highway system
- Virginia Routes; Interstate; US; Primary; Secondary; Byways; History; HOT lanes
← US 15	→ US 17

State Route 16 is a primary state highway in the southwest part of the U.S. state of Virginia. It runs from the North Carolina border at North Carolina Highway 16 north to the West Virginia border at West Virginia Route 16, passing through the towns of Troutdale, Marion, and Tazewell. Highway 16 is part of a three-state route 16 that connects the Charlotte region with northwestern West Virginia.

== Route description ==
=== Grayson County ===
SR 16 begins at the North Carolina state line near the community of Grassy Creek, where North Carolina Highway 16 ends. (Mayberry Road/State Route 856, the old alignment of SR 16, crosses a bit to the east, and quickly joins SR 16.) SR 16 heads in a general east-northeasterly direction alongside minor creeks until it reaches Wilson Creek. It crosses that creek and heads east (downstream) alongside it to the junction with U.S. Route 58 at Mouth of Wilson.

SR 16 and US 58 overlap northwest from Mouth of Wilson next to a minor creek and then next to Wilson Creek, this time heading upstream. At Volney, US 58 turns west, along with Wilson Creek, and SR 16 continues uphill, northward and northwestward past Grant and Troutdale, to its crossing of the Tennessee Valley Divide at Dickey Gap between Hurricane Mountain and Straight Mountain in the Iron Mountains.

=== Smyth County ===
Soon after crossing the divide, State Route 650, once the alignment of U.S. Route 58, splits off to the west, while SR 16 heads northeast and downhill to Sugar Grove. After a flat area near Sugar Grove, SR 16 again heads uphill, north and northwest across Brushy Mountain and the Appalachian Trail. It then runs northwest, following Staley Creek downhill past Attoway and Furnace Hill and through several gaps into Marion. Between Sugar Grove and Trout Dale(Grayson County) SR 16 share a routing concurrency with US Bicycle Route 76.

SR 16 enters the town of Marion on Commerce Street, meeting Interstate 81 and then State Route 217 (the Southwestern Virginia Mental Health Institute driveways). At Main Street (U.S. Route 11), SR 16 turns northeast, overlapping US 11 out of downtown to Park Boulevard. There it turns northwest to the city limits.

The road again heads uphill, passing the west shore of Hungry Mother Lake and the entrance to Hungry Mother State Park (State Route 348). SR 16 crosses Walker Mountain in a curving route, coming down into the Rich Valley and crossing the North Fork Holston River at Chatham Hill and State Route 42 soon after at Black Hill. Again SR 16 heads uphill, climbing Brushy Mountain to the county line.

=== Tazewell County ===
Another twisty descent takes SR 16 down Brushy Mountain into the Freestone Valley, but almost immediately it must rise again to cross Clinch Mountain. This time, a single hairpin turn takes it into the wide Thompson Valley, where it passes the community of Thompson Valley. A gap between Knob Mountain and Rich Mountain leads to U.S. Route 19/460 Business at Frog Level, just east of the north end of State Route 91.

SR 16 turns northeast along US 19/460 Business into Tazewell, meeting the State Route 16 Alternate (Fairground Road) shortcut along the way. The overlapped routes pass through downtown Tazewell on Main Street and Fincastle Turnpike; SR 16 then splits to the northwest on Tazewell Avenue. It crosses the U.S. Route 19/U.S. Route 460 bypass of Tazewell on its way to the west end of State Route 61 at North Tazewell, still inside the town of Tazewell. SR 16 turns west where it meets SR 61, paralleling the Clinch River to the north end of SR 16 Alternate at River Jack. There it turns north and leaves Tazewell.

SR 16 begins to rise again, passing Adria on its way to the community of Stony Ridge, then crossing the Tennessee Valley Divide again there. The road then descends the ridge to the northwest, crossing into West Virginia and becoming West Virginia Route 16 near the community of Bishop.

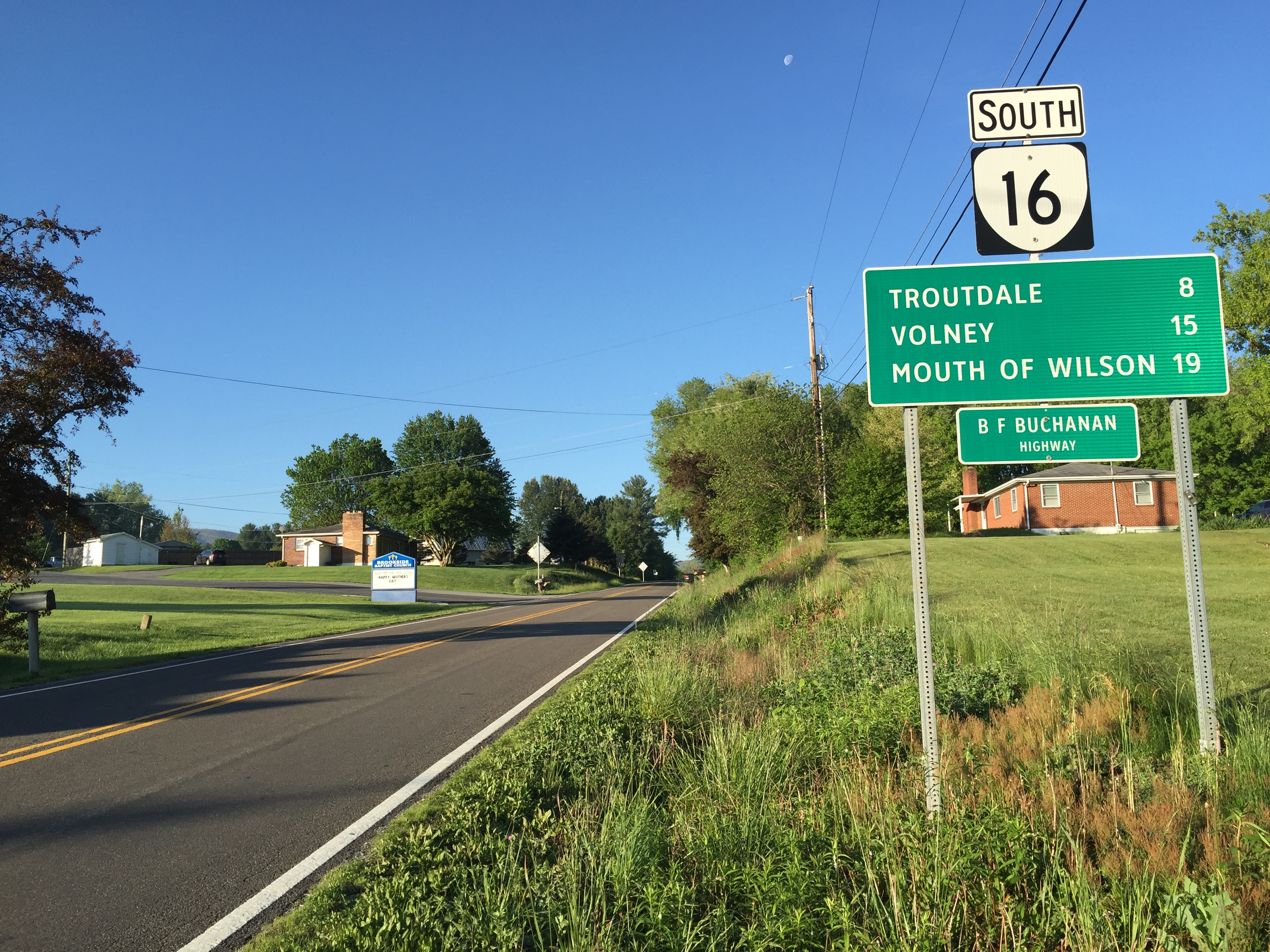
View south along SR 16 in Sugar Grove

=== Back of the Dragon ===
The section of SR 16 that passes between Marion and Tazewell is called the Back of the Dragon. It is a noted route of 32 miles (51 km) that has several hundred sharp turns, scenic overlooks and is a favorite of bicycle, motorcycle and sports car enthusiasts from several countries.

The Back of the Dragon crosses Big Walker, Brushy and Clinch Mountains along its route that runs from Hungry Mother State Park north of Marion for 32 miles (51 km) to Tazewell. Larry Brent Davidson spearheaded the naming of this section of the road because the route reminded him of the humps on the back of a dragon.

The turn count varies considerably with estimates of between 260 and 438 turns.

The speed limit is generally 55 miles per hour (89 km/h) with many turns marked at 15 miles per hour (24 km/h). Loose gravel, fallen rocks, agricultural trucks and vehicles suddenly coming out on the road, has led to 12 crashes, 13 injuries and no fatalities between 2013 and 2018, according to the Virginia Department of Motor Vehicles.

== History ==
One of the first two pieces of current SR 16 to be added to the state highway system was the road from Mouth of Wilson north to State Route 650 (Comers Creek Road) north of Troutdale, which was part of State Route 12 (the predecessor to U.S. Route 58) by 1923. Part of this, from Mouth of Wilson to Volney, still carries US 58.

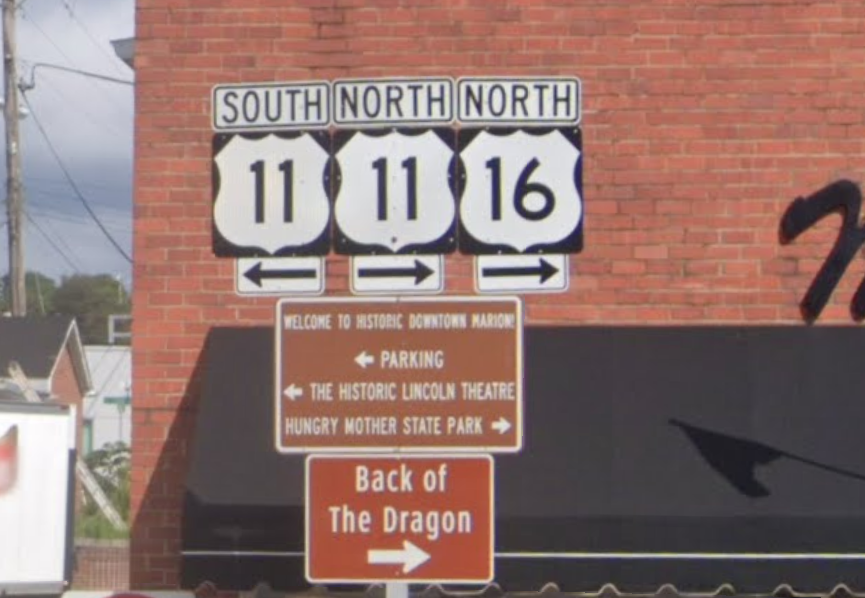
An erroneous "US 16" shield at the US 11 junction in Marion

At the other end, the State Highway Commission recommended that the General Assembly add the road from Tazewell north to North Tazewell to the state highway system in late 1921, as part of a relocation of State Route 11 (now U.S. Route 19/U.S. Route 460) to serve North Tazewell rather than Tazewell. The relocation was not made, but the spur and its continuation north to West Virginia was added, and was numbered State Route 117 in the 1923 renumbering. (The current route of US 19/US 460 does bypass Tazewell on much the same alignment as the SHC recommended.)

By 1927, SR 117 had become part of State Route 105, which continued south from Tazewell to Glade Spring along current State Route 91. This part of SR 16 north of Tazewell, along with the road south to Glade Spring, was renumbered State Route 112 in the 1928 renumbering and State Route 81 in the 1933 renumbering, not being split at Tazewell until 1940.

In 1928, the next piece of SR 16, running north and south from State Route 10 (now U.S. Route 11 in Marion, 6.8 miles (10.9 km) in each direction, was added to the state highway system as State Route 113. Further extensions were added south to SR 12 (now State Route 650) in 1930 and 1931 and north for 1.90 miles (3.06 km) and 3.00 miles (4.83 km) in 1931 and 1932 respectively (taking it to Chatham Hill). In 1932, a 4.78-mile (7.69 km) piece on the other side of Brushy Mountain was added, from SR 11 near Tazewell south to SR 602 (Pleasant Hill Church Road) at Criggers.

Both pieces of SR 113 - through Marion and south from Tazewell - became State Route 88 in the 1933 renumbering. In 1933 and 1934, the Marion section was extended north to State Route 42. The final piece in Smyth County was added in 1936; the gap in Tazewell County was filled in 1937 and 1938.

The whole piece of present SR 16 from State Route 12 (now U.S. Route 58) at Mouth of Wilson southwest to North Carolina Highway 681 (now North Carolina Highway 16) was added in 1931 as State Route 139. It was renumbered State Route 92 in the 1933 renumbering.

In the 1940 renumbering, the present route of State Route 16 was assigned over all of SR 92 and SR 88 and the part of SR 81 north of Tazewell. (The rest of SR 81 was simultaneously renumbered State Route 91, and U.S. Route 58 was removed from the Volney-Troutdale piece of SR 16.) At the same time, North Carolina Highway 681 and West Virginia Route 12 were renumbered as North Carolina Highway 16 and West Virginia Route 16, forming a three-state route.

== Major intersections ==
County	Location	mi	km	Destinations	Notes
Grayson		0.00	0.00	NC 16 south – Jefferson	Continuation from North Carolina
Grayson	Mouth of Wilson	4.06	6.53	US 58 east (Wilson Highway) – Independence, Galax	South end of US 58 concurrency
Grayson	Volney	8.05	12.96	US 58 west (Highlands Parkway) – Damascus	North end of US 58 concurrency
Smyth	Dickey Gap	17.4	28.0	SR 650 (Comers Creek Road)	former SR 81 west
Smyth	Sugar Grove	22.6	36.4	SR 601 (Teas Road) – St. Clair Bottom, Teas, Thomas Bridge	
Smyth	Sugar Grove	22.8	36.7	SR 695 (Slemp Creek Road) – Cedar Springs	former planned SR 81 east
Smyth	Marion	31.15	50.13	I-81 – Abingdon, Wytheville	I-81 exit 45
Smyth	Marion	32.20	51.82	SR 217 (State Street) – Southwestern Virginia Mental Health Institute	
Smyth	Marion	32.88	52.92	US 11 south (Main Street) – Chilhowie, Lincoln Theatre	South end of US 11 concurrency
Smyth	Marion	34.07	54.83	US 11 north (Main Street) to I-81 – Wytheville	North end of US 11 concurrency
Smyth		37.86	60.93	SR 348 east (Hungry Mother Drive) – Hungry Mother Park	
Smyth		47.29	76.11	SR 42 west (Blue Grass Trail) – Broadford	South end of SR 42 concurrency
Smyth		47.61	76.62	SR 42 east (Old Wilderness Road) – Bland	North end of SR 42 concurrency
Tazewell	Frog Level	63.63	102.40	US 19 Bus. south / US 460 Bus. west (Crab Orchard Road) – Bristol, Grundy	South end of US 19 Bus. / US 460 Bus. concurrency
Tazewell	Tazewell	65.38	105.22	SR 16 Alt. north (Fairground Road)	
Tazewell	Tazewell	66.63	107.23	US 19 Bus. north / US 460 Bus. east (Fincastle Turnpike)	North end of US 19 Bus. / US 460 Bus. concurrency
Tazewell	Tazewell	67.46	108.57	US 19 / US 460 – Claypool Hill, Bluefield	US 19 / US 460 exit 2
Tazewell	Tazewell	67.90	109.27	SR 61 east (East Riverside Drive)	
Tazewell	Tazewell	69.20	111.37	SR 16 Alt. south (Fairground Road)	
Tazewell	Bishop	77.58	124.85	WV 16 north – Welch	Continuation to West Virginia
1.000 mi = 1.609 km; 1.000 km = 0.621 mi: Concurrency terminus

== SR 16 Alternate ==
State Route 16 Alternate
- Location: Tazewell
- Length: 1.61 mi (2.59 km)

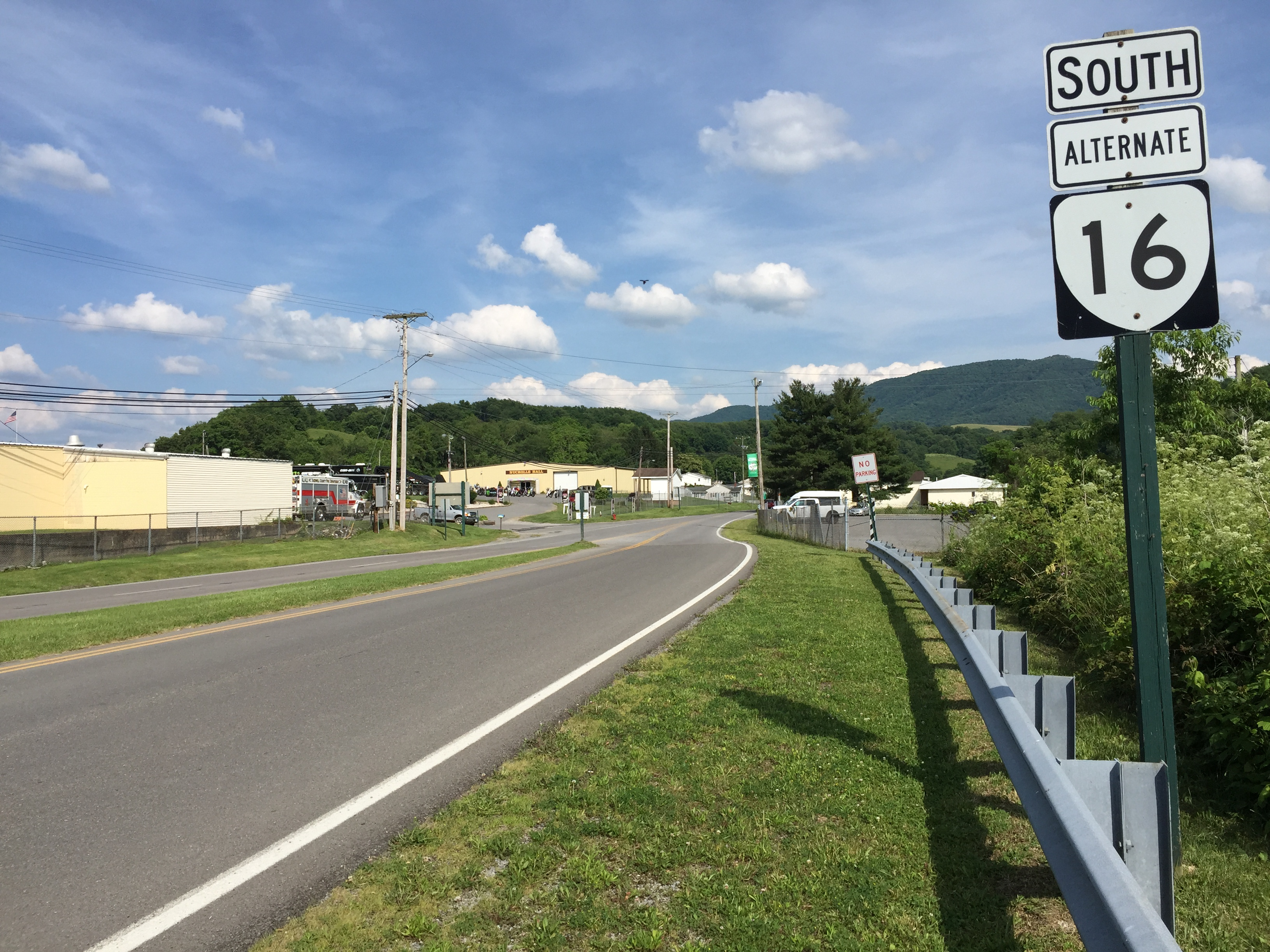
View south along SR 16 Alternate at US 19/US 460 in Tazewell

State Route 16 Alternate is a primary state highway in and near the town of Tazewell, Virginia, United States. It is an alternate route of State Route 16, with both ends in Tazewell; the route is shorter than staying on SR 16 through Tazewell.

SR 16 Alternate begins at SR 16 where it overlaps U.S. Route 19/460 Business in southwestern Tazewell. It generally heads northwest, leaving the town before interchanging with the U.S. Route 19/U.S. Route 460 bypass. SR 16 Alternate re-enters Tazewell, crossing the Clinch River before ending at SR 16 in the River Jack area of Tazewell.

SR 16 Alternate was added to the primary state highway system in 1953; it had been secondary State Route 631.

< SR 112	District 1 State Routes; 1928–1933	SR 114 >
< SR 138	District 1 State Routes; 1928–1933	none
