= Doran, Virginia =

- Census-designated places
- Location within Virginia Location within the United States
- Coordinates: 37°05′33″N 81°50′00″W
- Country: United States
- State: Virginia
- County: Tazewell
- Elevation: 1,929 ft (588 m)

Population (2020)
  - Total: 113
- Time zone: UTC-5 (Eastern (EST))
  - Summer (DST): UTC-4 (EDT)
- ZIP code: 24612
- Area code: 276
- GNIS feature ID: 1499351

Doran is an unincorporated community and census-designated place in Tazewell County, Virginia, United States. Doran is located along the Clinch River, U.S. Route 460 and Virginia State Route 67 between Richlands and Raven. Doran has a post office with ZIP code 24612. The community was named for Joseph I. Doran, who was the general counsel for the Norfolk and Western Railway. It was first listed as a CDP in the 2020 census with a population of 113.

== Demographics ==
Historical population
| Census | Pop. | Note | %± |
|---|---|---|---|
U.S. Decennial Census; 2010

Doran first appeared as a census designated place in the 2020 U.S. census.
