= Adria, Virginia =

- Unincorporated community
- Location within Virginia Location within the United States
- Coordinates: 37°10′07″N 81°32′45″W
- Country: United States
- State: Virginia
- County: Tazewell
- Elevation: 2,464 ft (751 m)
- Time zone: UTC-5 (Eastern (EST))
  - Summer (DST): UTC-4 (EDT)
- Area code: 276
- GNIS feature ID: 1462375

Adria is an unincorporated community in Tazewell County, Virginia, United States. Adria is located on Virginia Route 16, 4 miles (6.4 km) north-northwest of Tazewell.
