= Williams House (Richlands, Virginia) =

Historic house in Virginia, United States

- U.S. National Register of Historic Places
- U.S. Historic district – Contributing property
- Virginia Landmarks Register
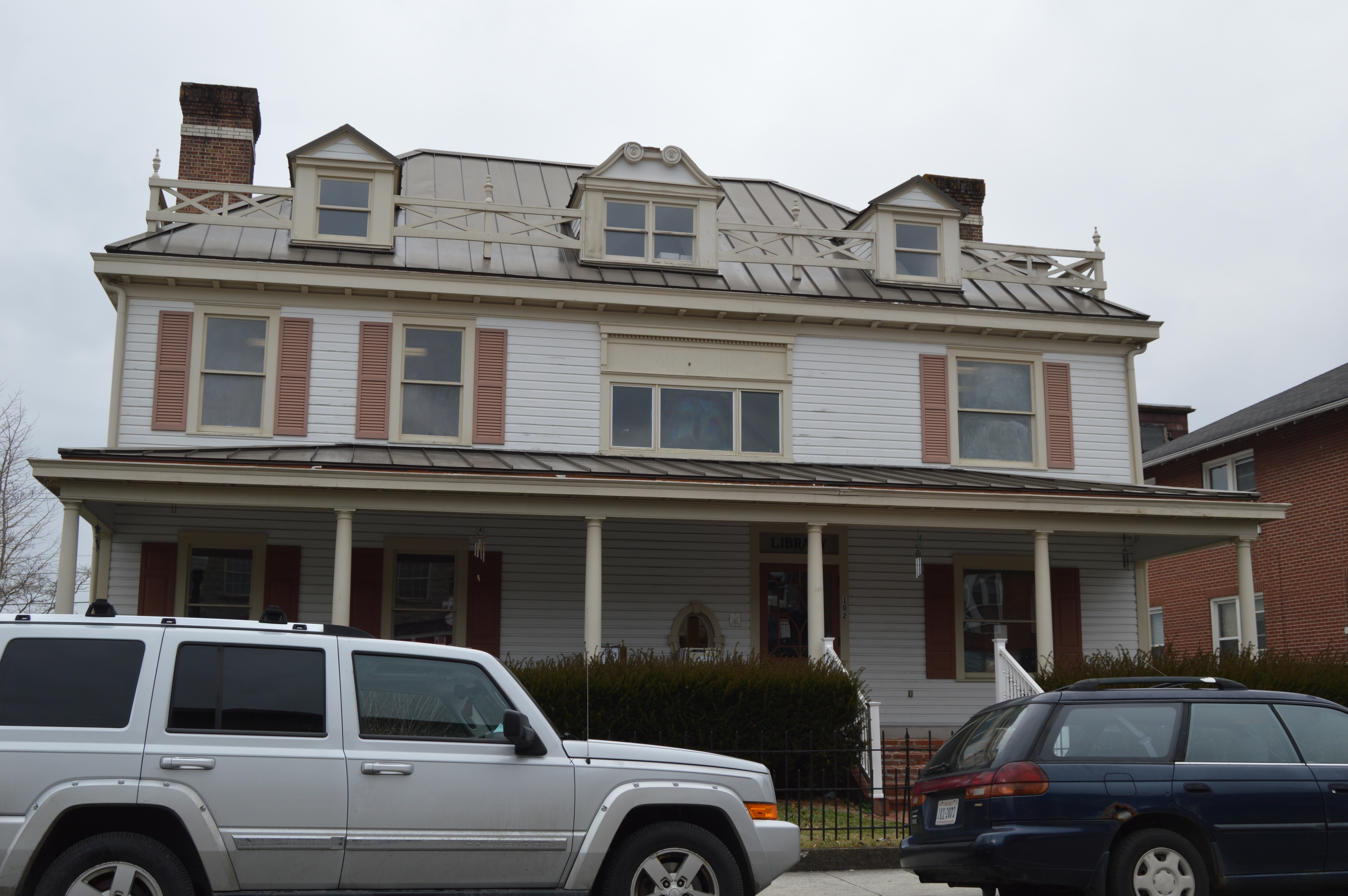
- Front of the house

- Location within Virginia Location within the United States
- Location: 102 Suffolk Ave., Richlands, Virginia
- Coordinates: 37°5′37″N 81°47′54″W
- Area: 0.3 acres (0.12 ha)
- Built: 1890
- Built by: Clinch Valley Coal & Iron
- Architectural style: Colonial Revival, Georgian Revival
- Part of: Richlands Historic District (ID07000394)
- NRHP reference No.: 83003319
- VLR No.: 148-5018

Significant dates
- Added to NRHP: July 7, 1983
- Designated VLR: September 16, 1982

The Williams House, also known as the Clinch Valley Coal and Iron Company Office, is a historic home and office located at Richlands, Tazewell County, Virginia. It was built in 1890, and is a 2 1/2-story, frame Georgian Revival style dwelling. It has a hipped roof with pedimented dormers and features a one-story, hip-roofed front porch supported by six slender Tuscan order columns. It originally served as the office for the Clinch Valley Coal and Iron Company, developer of Richlands. The building was sold in 1901 to Dr. William R. Williams, who used it as a residence. In 1984, it became the location of the town's branch of the Tazewell County Public Library.

It was listed on the National Register of Historic Places in 1982. It is located in the Richlands Historic District.
