= Charles W. G. Rich =

U.S. Army lieutenant general

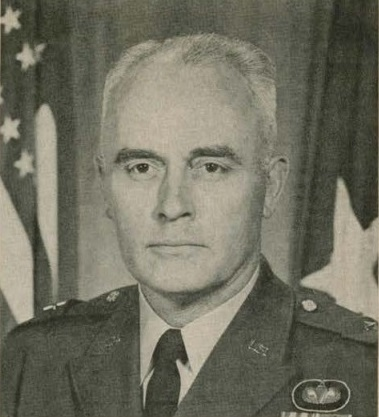
- Rich as a brigadier general in 1959
- Born: October 22, 1910; Bandy, Virginia, U.S.
- Died: August 24, 1993 (aged 82); Hilton Head Island, South Carolina, U.S.
- Burial place: West Point Cemetery, West Point, New York, U.S.
- Education: United States Military Academy; Armed Forces Staff College; United States Army War College
- Spouse(s): Lucile Elizabeth Schalker (m. 1935); Eleanor Digby (m. 1972)
- Children: 2
- Military career
- Service: United States Army
- Service years: 1929–1931; 1935–1970
- Rank: Lieutenant General
- Service number: O19910
- Unit: United States Army Infantry Branch
- Commands: 2nd Battalion, 19th Infantry Regiment; 2nd Parachute Training Regiment; 15th Infantry Regiment; Commandant of Cadets of the United States Military Academy; 101st Airborne Division; Commandant of the United States Army Infantry School and Fort Benning; Third United States Army; I Corps; U.S. Army Office of Reserve Components
- Wars: World War II; Korean War
- Awards: Army Distinguished Service Medal (2); Silver Star; Legion of Merit (2); Bronze Star Medal; French Legion of Honor (Chevalier); French Croix de Guerre with two palms Polish Order of Polonia Restituta (Officer); Belgian Croix de Guerre; South Korean Order of National Security Merit (Gukseon)

Charles W. G. Rich (December 22, 1910 – August 24, 1993) was a career officer in the United States Army. A 1935 graduate of the United States Military Academy and veteran of World War II and the Korean War, Rich attained the rank of lieutenant general. He was a recipient of several decorations, including two awards of the Army Distinguished Service Medal, the Silver Star, two awards of the Legion of Merit, the Bronze Star Medal, the French Legion of Honor (Chevalier), French Croix de Guerre with two palms, Polish Order of Polonia Restituta (Officer), Belgian Croix de Guerre, and South Korean Order of National Security Merit (Gukseon).

A 1948 graduate of the Armed Forces Staff College and a 1953 graduate of the United States Army War College, Rich served in several high-profile command positions during his career, including: 2nd Battalion, 19th Infantry Regiment; 2nd Parachute Training Regiment; 15th Infantry Regiment; Commandant of Cadets of the United States Military Academy; 101st Airborne Division; Commandant of the United States Army Infantry School and Fort Benning; Third United States Army; I Corps; and Chief of the United States Army Office of Reserve Components.

== Early life ==
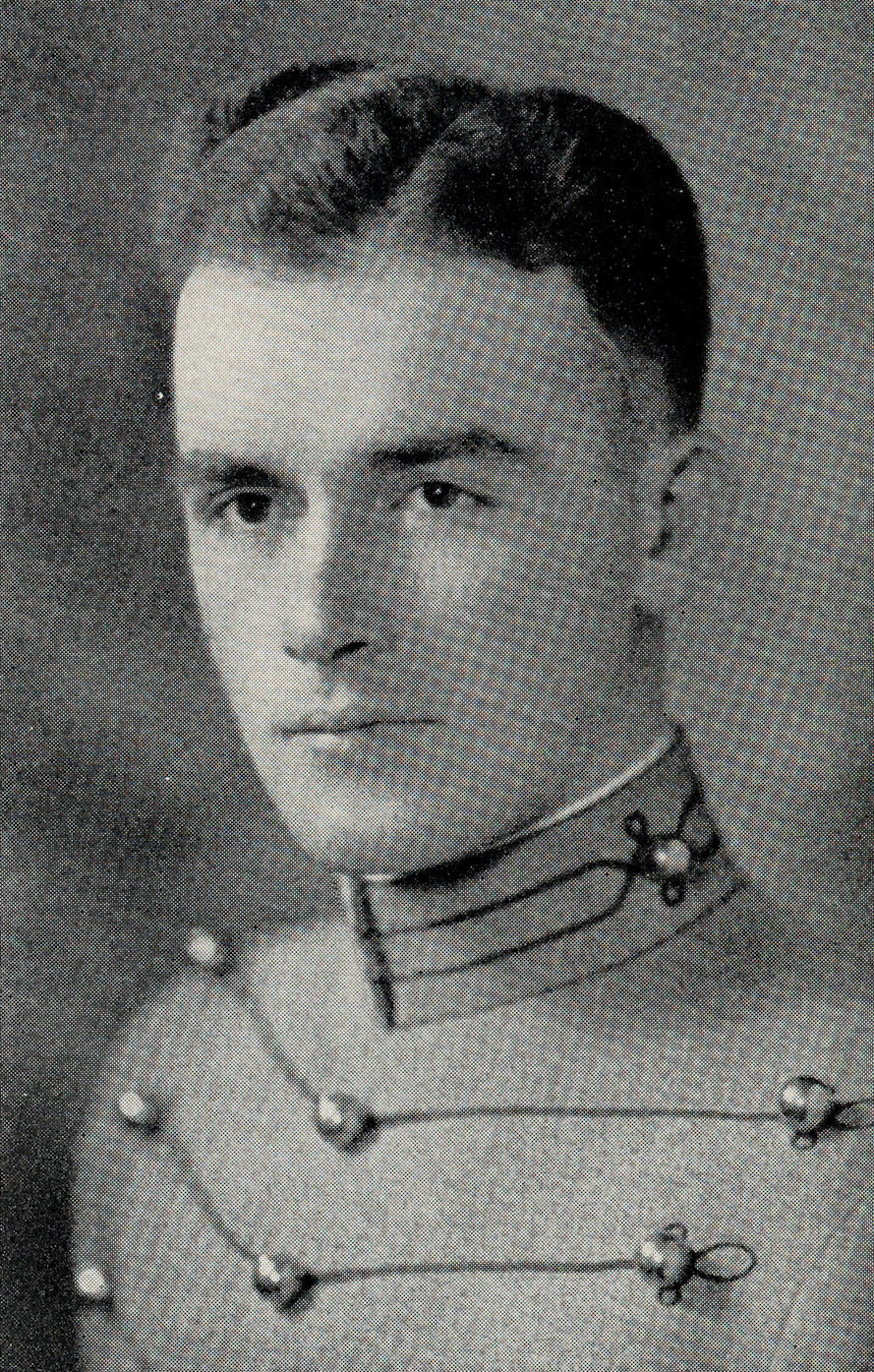
Rich as a West Point cadet in 1935

Charles Wythe Gleaves Rich was born in Bandy, Virginia on December 22, 1910, the son of John Robert Rich and Anna Maria (Gleaves) Rich. He was raised and educated in Glade, West Virginia and Princeton, Virginia, and enlisted in the United States Army in November 1929. Assigned first as a flight cadet with the Army Bombardment Group at Langley Field, Virginia, in September 1930 he was assigned to the 12th Coast Artillery Regiment at Fort Monroe, Virginia while attending the United States Military Academy Preparatory School. He attained the rank of private first class and was discharged in July 1931 so he could begin attendance at the United States Military Academy.

In 1931, Rich received an appointment to the United States Military Academy at West Point from U.S. Senator Henry D. Hatfield. He graduated in 1935 ranked 202 of 277, and received his commission as a second lieutenant of Infantry. While at West Point, Rich was a member of the track and field, basketball, and cross country running teams. After graduation, he joined the New York Athletic Club, which he represented in the 400-meter hurdle event at several track and field meets.

== Start of career ==
After receiving his commission, Rich was assigned to the 7th Infantry Regiment at Vancouver Barracks, Washington. He was promoted to first lieutenant in June 1938, and he attended the Infantry Officer's Course at Fort Benning, Georgia from September 1938 to June 1939. In August 1939, he was assigned to the 19th Infantry Regiment at Schofield Barracks, Hawaii. He was promoted to captain in September 1940, and served as the 19th Infantry's assistant adjutant in the period immediately prior to U.S. entry into World War II.

== World War II ==
Rich was serving as the 19th Infantry's Intelligence staff officer (S-2) when the Japanese attacked Pearl Harbor on December 7, 1941. He took part in the subsequent defense of Hawaii, and served as the 19th Infantry's Operations staff officer (S-3), followed by assignment as commander of the regiment's 2nd Battalion. He was promoted to temporary major in June 1941 and temporary lieutenant colonel in January 1943.

In February 1943, Rich was assigned as a student at Fort Benning's United States Army Airborne School. After completing the qualification course, he remained on the Airborne School's staff, first as S-3, then as executive officer. He was then assigned to command the 2nd Parachute Training Regiment, which he led until being assigned to the European Theatre in October 1944. Rich was promoted to temporary colonel in September 1944.

After arriving in France, Rich was assigned to the staff of the Sixth United States Army Group as the G-3's airborne tactics advisor. He subsequently served as assistant chief of staff of the XXI Corps, and assistant chief of staff for personnel (G-1). After the war, he performed occupation duty as chief of staff of the Oise Base Section in Reims, chief of staff of the Western Base Section in Paris, and assistant deputy chief of staff of Headquarters, European Command in Frankfurt.

== Continued career ==
Rich's temporary colonel rank was terminated in June 1947, and he continued to serve as a temporary lieutenant colonel. After returning to the United States, he attended the Armed Forces Staff College (AFSC) beginning in August 1947, followed by assignment as an AFSC instructor as well as its secretary. He received promotion to permanent major in July 1948. In June 1950, Rich was assigned as executive officer of the 325th Infantry Regiment at Fort Bragg, North Carolina. He was subsequently assigned as G-3 of the 82nd Airborne Division, followed by promotion to colonel and assignment as the division chief of staff.

In 1952, Rich began attendance at the United States Army War College, and he graduated in 1953. After completing the War College course, Rich was assigned to command the 15th Infantry Regiment in South Korea during the Korean War, and he later served as deputy chief of staff for IX Corps.

After his return from Korea, Rich was assigned to staff duty with the army's Office of the Deputy Chief of Staff for Personnel, G-1. He was promoted to brigadier general in 1956. In May 1958, he was assigned as assistant division commander of the 101st Airborne Division at Fort Campbell, Kentucky.

== Later career ==
From September 1959 to June 1961, Rich served as Commandant of Cadets of the United States Military Academy. He was promoted to major general in July 1961 and assigned as commander of the 101st Airborne Division. He was assigned as commander of the Fort Benning U.S. Infantry Center and commandant of the Infantry School in February 1963.

Rich was promoted to lieutenant general in August 1963 and assigned as commander of Third United States Army. From July 1965 to August 1966 Rich served as deputy commander of Eighth United States Army in Korea. He was acting commander of I Corps in July 1965 and November 1965. He became Chief of the United States Army Office of Reserve Components in September 1966. Rich retired in August 1970.

== Awards and decorations ==
Rich's major awards and decorations included:

Master Parachutist Badge
Army Distinguished Service Medal with oak leaf cluster
Silver Star	Legion of Merit with oak leaf cluster	Bronze Star Medal
Army Commendation Medal	American Defense Service Medal w/ 1 bronze service star	Asiatic–Pacific Campaign Medal w/ 1 bronze service star
American Campaign Medal	European–African–Middle Eastern Campaign Medal w/ 3 bronze service stars	World War II Victory Medal
Army of Occupation Medal	National Defense Service Medal w/ 1 bronze service star	Korean Service Medal
Legion of Honor (Chevalier) (France)	Croix de Guerre with two palms (France)	Order of Polonia Restituta (Officer) (Poland)
Croix de Guerre (Belgium)	Order of National Security Merit (Gukseon) (South Korea)	United Nations Korea Medal

United States Army Central Shoulder sleeve insignia

== Retirement ==
In retirement, Rich was a resident of Hilton Head Island, South Carolina. An avid golfer, he was a member of the Army-Navy Club and served as its president. He was also a member of the Port Royal Plantation Club on Hilton Head and served as its president, as well as a member and president of the South Carolina Senior Men's Golf Association.

Rich was also a civic activist and served on the board of trustees of the Hilton Head Hospital, where he was also a volunteer. In addition, he served on Hilton Head's Human Relations Council and was an active member of Hilton Head's All Saints Episcopal Church.

Rich died at Hilton Head's The Preston Health Center on August 24, 1993. He was buried at West Point Cemetery.

== Family ==
In 1935, Rich married Lucile Elizabeth Schalker. She died in 1971, and in 1972, he married Eleanor Digby, who survived him. With his first wife, Rich was the father of two daughters, Anne and Roselyn.
