= Red Ash, Virginia =

- Unincorporated community
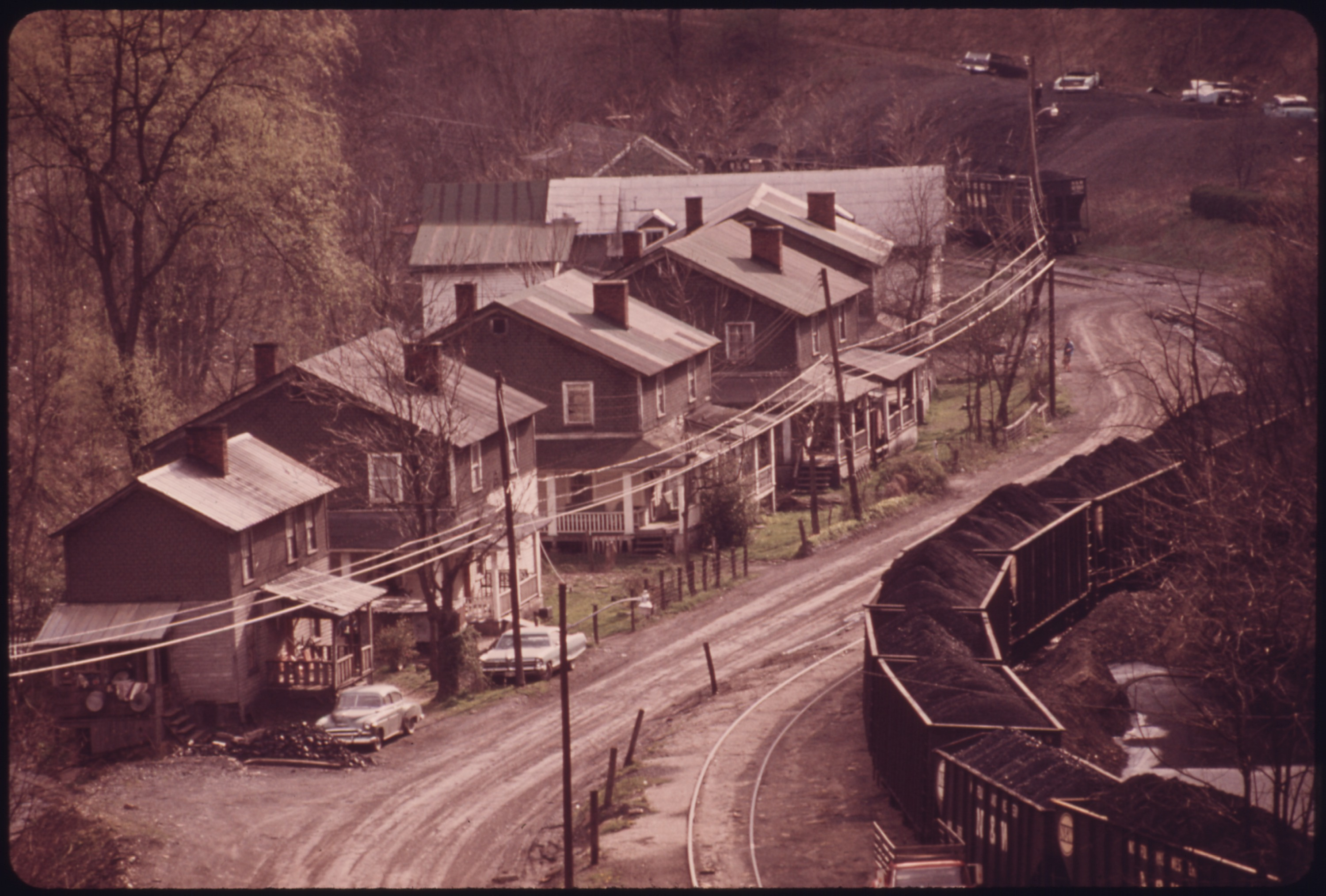
- Red Ash in 1974

- Location within Virginia Location within the United States
- Coordinates: 37°6′48″N 81°52′15″W
- Country: United States
- State: Virginia
- County: Tazewell
- Elevation: 2,155 ft (657 m)
- Time zone: UTC-5 (Eastern (EST))
  - Summer (DST): UTC-4 (EDT)
- ZIP codes: 24640
- GNIS feature ID: 1499940

Red Ash is an unincorporated community and coal town located in Tazewell County, Virginia, United States. The community is located along VSR 804, which runs parallel to US 460 north of Raven.
