= Richlands Historic District (Richlands, Virginia) =

Historic district in Virginia, United States

- U.S. National Register of Historic Places
- U.S. Historic district
- Virginia Landmarks Register
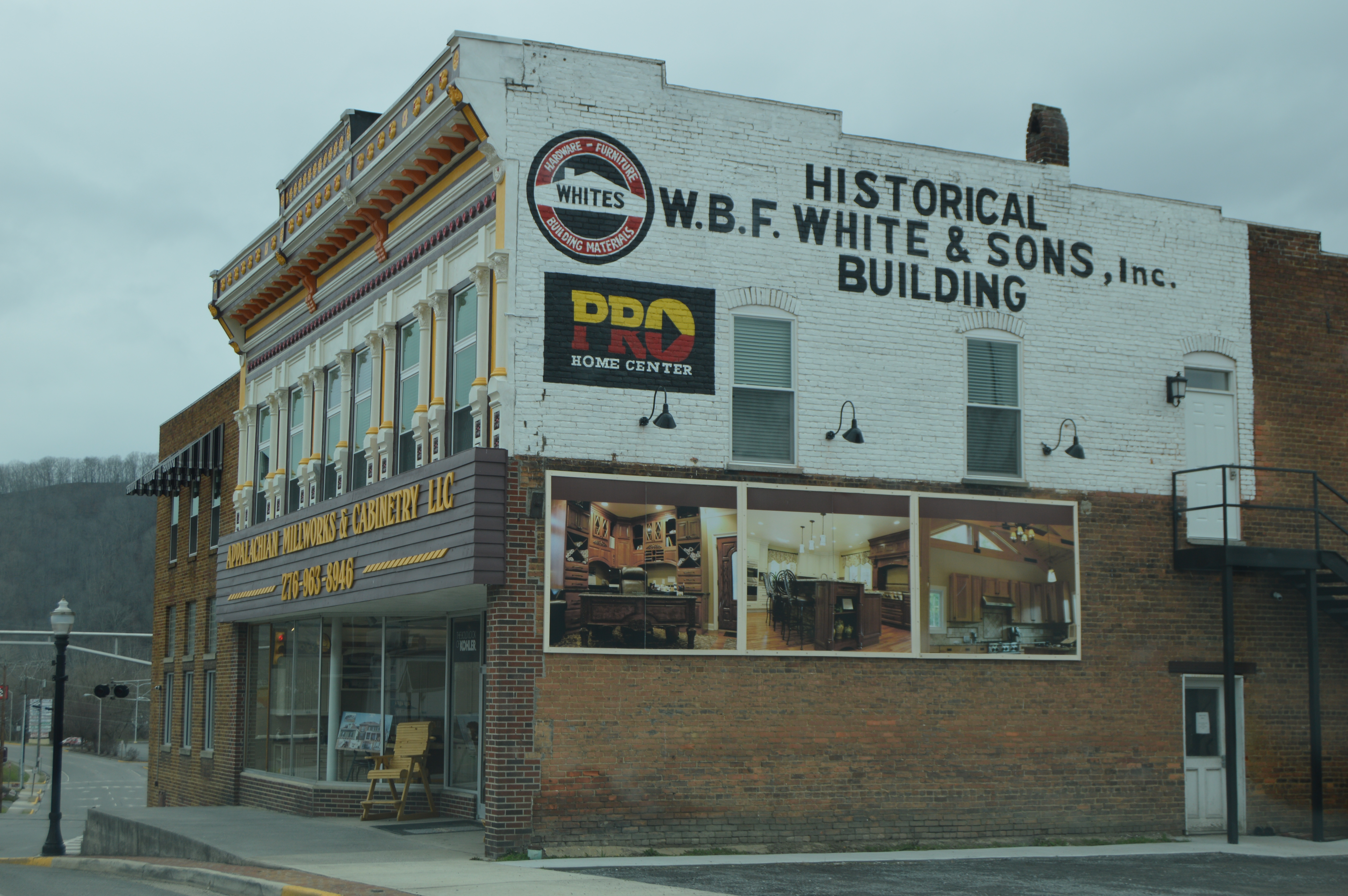
- W.B.F. White and Sons Hardware building

- Location within Virginia Location within the United States
- Location: Includes portions of Front, Second, Third, Fourth Sts., and Grayson Ave., Lee St., Washington Sq. and Suffolk Ave., Richlands, Virginia
- Coordinates: 37°5′40″N 81°48′22″W
- Area: 40 acres (16 ha)
- Architectural style: Late Victorian, Late 19th And 20th Century Revivals
- NRHP reference No.: 07000394
- VLR No.: 148-5014

Significant dates
- Added to NRHP: May 2, 2007
- Designated VLR: December 6, 2006

Richlands Historic District is a national historic district located at Richlands, Tazewell County, Virginia. The district encompasses 91 contributing buildings in the central business district of the town of Richlands. It includes residential, commercial, and institutional buildings dating from the late-19th to mid-20th centuries. Notable buildings include the W.B.F. White and Sons Hardware building (c. 1892), Bank of Richlands (c. 1890), Norfolk and Western Railroad Section House (c. 1889), First Christian Church (1908), First United Methodist Church, and Richlands Presbyterian Church. Also located in the district is the separately listed Clinch Valley Coal and Iron Company Office.

was listed on the National Register of Historic Places in 2007.
