= Tazewell Avenue Historic District =

Historic district in Virginia, United States

- U.S. National Register of Historic Places
- U.S. Historic district
- Virginia Landmarks Register
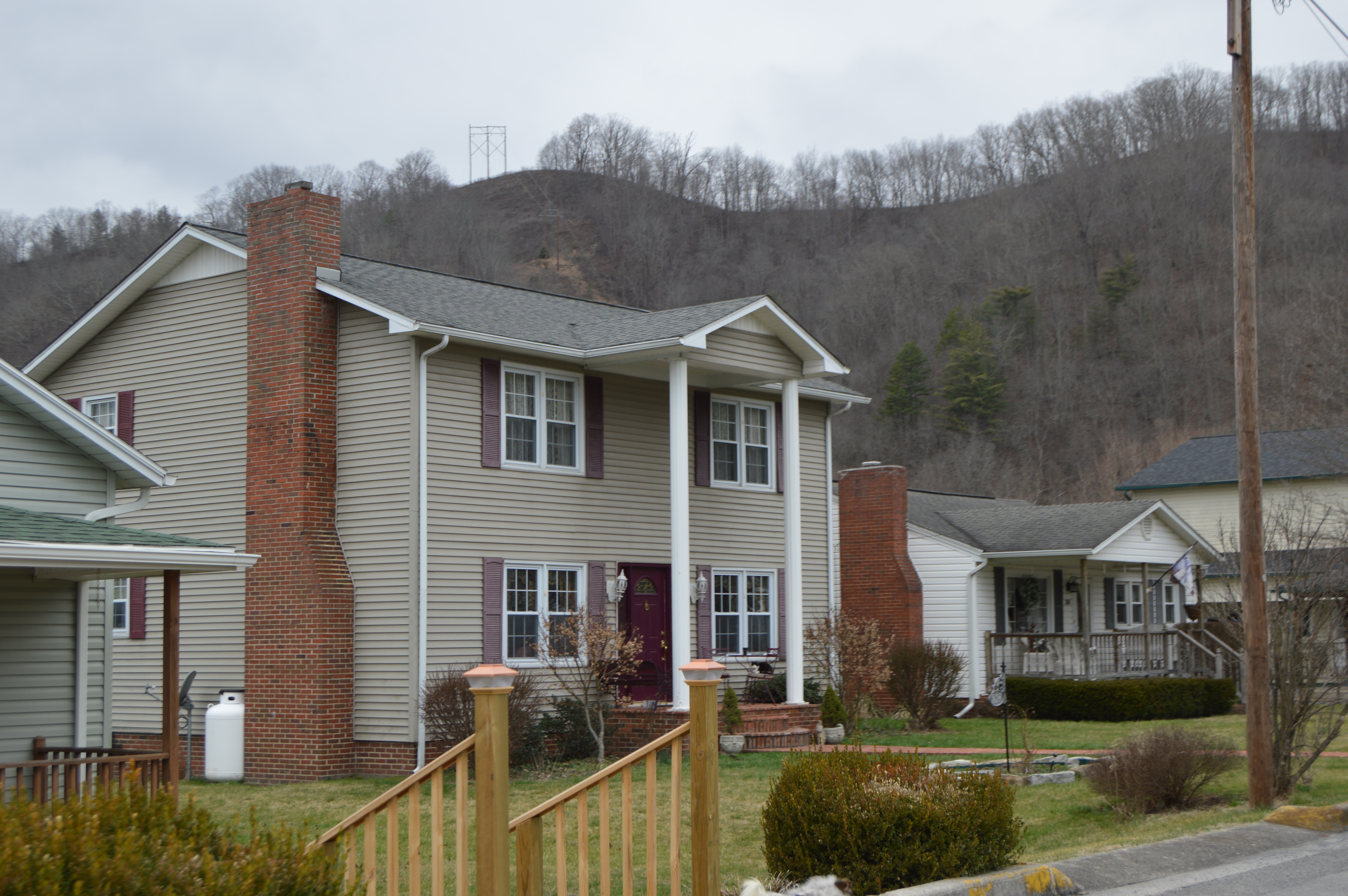
- Houses on Tazewell Avenue

- Location within Virginia Location within the United States
- Location: Tazewell Ave, Fairfax Ave, Front St., Second St., Third St., & Fourth St, Richlands, Virginia
- Coordinates: 37°5′46″N 81°48′21″W
- Area: 15 acres (6.1 ha)
- Built: 1900
- Architect: F Fields, W. W., Sr.; Brown, Joe
- Architectural style: Queen Anne, Colonial Revival, Bungalow/Craftsman
- NRHP reference No.: 10000147
- VLR No.: 148-5020

Significant dates
- Added to NRHP: March 31, 2010
- Designated VLR: December 17, 2009

Tazewell Avenue Historic District is a national historic district located at Richlands, Tazewell County, Virginia. The district encompasses 70 contributing buildings in a primarily residential section of the town of Richlands. They were largely built between 1900 and 1960, and are modestly scaled brick and frame dwellings reflecting popular architectural styles including Queen Anne, Colonial Revival, and Bungalow. Notable non-residential buildings include the former Pentecostal Holiness Church, former First Baptist Church, Barker Youth Center (1955), Nassif Building (c. 1945), and Masonic Hall and Jenkins Cleaners Building (c. 1930).

It was listed on the National Register of Historic Places in 2007.
