= Bandy, Virginia =

- Unincorporated community
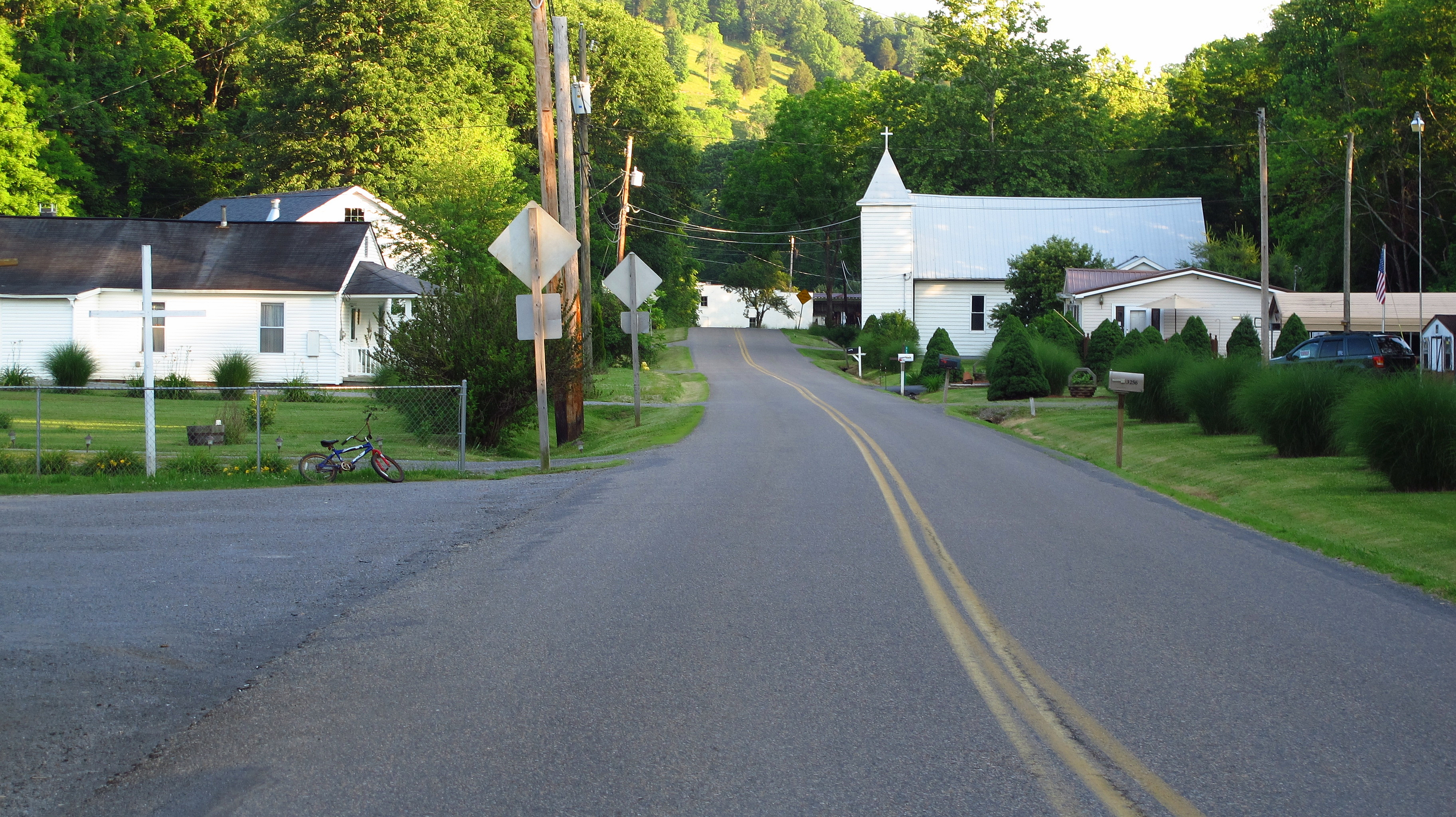
- State Road 627 in Bandy

- Location within Virginia Location within the United States
- Coordinates: 37°08′34″N 81°42′03″W
- Country: United States
- State: Virginia
- County: Tazewell
- Elevation: 2,119 ft (646 m)
- Time zone: UTC-5 (Eastern (EST))
  - Summer (DST): UTC-4 (EDT)
- ZIP code: 24602
- Area code: 276
- GNIS feature ID: 1492508

Bandy is an unincorporated community in Tazewell County, Virginia, United States. Bandy is located at the junction of State Routes 624 and 627, 3.4 miles (5.5 km) northeast of Richlands. Bandy has a post office with ZIP code 24602.

The community was named for early settler William W. "Billy" Bandy.
