= Wardell, Virginia =

- Unincorporated community
- Location within Virginia Location within the United States
- Coordinates: 37°01′52″N 81°47′40″W
- Country: United States
- State: Virginia
- County: Tazewell
- Elevation: 2,060 ft (630 m)
- Time zone: UTC−5 (Eastern (EST))
  - Summer (DST): UTC−4 (EDT)
- Area code: 276
- GNIS feature ID: 1500276

Wardell is an unincorporated community located in Tazewell County, Virginia, United States.
