= Liberty, Tazewell County, Virginia =

Liberty, Virginia
- Unincorporated community
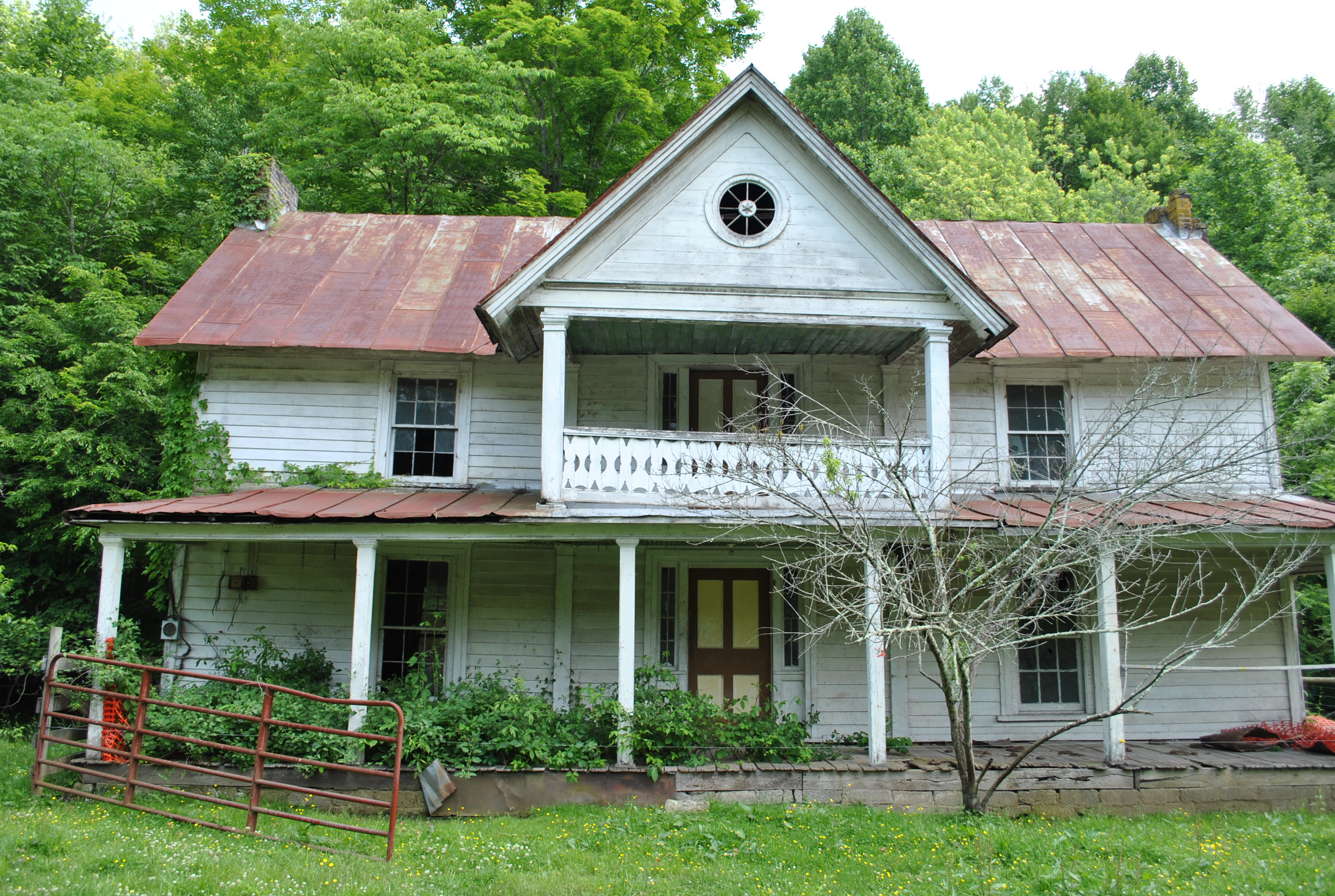

- Location within Virginia Location within the United States
- Coordinates: 37°03′24″N 81°39′14″W
- Country: United States
- State: Virginia
- County: Tazewell
- Elevation: 2,382 ft (726 m)
- Time zone: UTC-5 (Eastern (EST))
  - Summer (DST): UTC-4 (EDT)
- Area code: 276
- GNIS feature ID: 1499660

Liberty is an unincorporated community located in Tazewell County, Virginia, United States.
