= Jewell Ridge, Virginia =

- Census-designated place
- Location within Virginia Location within the United States
- Coordinates: 37°11′05″N 81°47′18″W
- Country: United States
- State: Virginia
- County: Tazewell

Area
  - Total: 0.414 sq mi (1.07 km^{2})
  - Land: 0.414 sq mi (1.07 km^{2})
  - Water: 0 sq mi (0 km^{2})
- Elevation: 2,969 ft (905 m)

Population (2020)
  - Total: 149
  - Density: 359.9/sq mi (139.0/km^{2})
- Time zone: UTC-5 (Eastern (EST))
  - Summer (DST): UTC-4 (EDT)
- ZIP code: 24622
- Area code: 276
- GNIS feature ID: 2807450

Jewell Ridge is an unincorporated community and census-designated place in Tazewell County, Virginia, United States. As of the 2020 census, Jewell Ridge had a population of 149. Jewell Ridge is 6.3 miles (10.1 km) north of Richlands. Jewell Ridge has a post office with ZIP code 24622.

== Demographics ==
Historical population
Census	Pop.	Note	%±
U.S. Decennial Census; 2010

Jewell Ridge first appeared as a census designated place in the 2020 U.S. census.
