= Tannersville, Virginia =

- Unincorporated community
- Location within Virginia Location within the United States
- Coordinates: 36°58′24″N 81°37′31″W
- Country: United States
- State: Virginia
- County: Tazewell
- Elevation: 1,942 ft (592 m)
- Time zone: UTC−5 (Eastern (EST))
  - Summer (DST): UTC−4 (EDT)
- Area code: 276
- GNIS feature ID: 1493687

Tannersville is an unincorporated community in Tazewell County, Virginia, United States. It is located in the Eastern Time Zone.

== Notable person ==
- Billy Wagner, baseball player and member of the National Baseball Hall of Fame.

== See also ==
- Claypool Hill, Virginia
- Saltville, Virginia
