= Swords Creek, Virginia =

Swords Creek
- Unincorporated community
- Location within Virginia Location within the United States
- Coordinates: 37°02′10″N 81°55′04″W
- Country: United States
- State: Virginia
- County: Russell
- Elevation: 1,867 ft (569 m)
- Time zone: UTC−5 (Eastern (EST))
  - Summer (DST): UTC−4 (EDT)
- ZIP code: 24649
- Area code: 276
- GNIS feature ID: 1496285

Swords Creek is an unincorporated community in Russell County, Virginia, United States. Swords Creek is located at the junction of Virginia State Route 67 and State Route 633, 3.4 miles (5.5 km) east-northeast of Honaker. Swords Creek has a post office with ZIP code 24649. The community was founded by hunters Henry and Michael Sword, for whom the settlement was named.
