= Springville, Virginia =

Springville
- CDP
- Location within the Commonwealth of Virginia
- Coordinates: 37°11′56″N 81°23′46″W
- Country: United States
- State: Virginia
- County: Tazewell

Population (2010)
  - Total: 1,371
- Time zone: UTC−5 (Eastern (EST))
  - Summer (DST): UTC−4 (EDT)
- ZIP codes: 24630
- FIPS code: 51-74848
- GNIS feature ID: 2629846

Springville is a census-designated place in Tazewell County, Virginia, United States. It is the midpoint between Bluefield and Tazewell on US 460 and US 19. As of the 2020 census, Springville had a population of 1,043.

Springville is home to several churches including Destiny Outreach Ministries and Springville Christian Church which is purported to be the oldest congregation in Tazewell County.

The Bluestone River rises in the Springville area on East River Mountain.

== Demographics ==
Historical population
| Census | Pop. | Note | %± |
|---|---|---|---|
| 2010 | 1,371 | | — |
| 2020 | 1,043 | | −23.9% |
U.S. Decennial Census; 2010 2020

Springville was first listed as a census designated place in the 2010 U.S. census.
