= Busthead, Virginia =

- Unincorporated community
- Location within Virginia Location within the United States
- Coordinates: 37°06′26″N 81°41′53″W
- Country: United States
- State: Virginia
- County: Tazewell
- Elevation: 2,182 ft (665 m)
- Time zone: UTC-5 (Eastern (EST))
  - Summer (DST): UTC-4 (EDT)
- Area code: 276
- GNIS feature ID: 1499200

Busthead, a tiny community in the western end of Baptist Valley, near Cedar Bluff, is an unincorporated community located in Tazewell County, Virginia, United States.
