= Coaldan, Virginia =

- Unincorporated community
- Location within Virginia Location within the United States
- Coordinates: 37°9′41″N 81°47′23″W
- Country: United States
- State: Virginia
- County: Tazewell
- Elevation: 2,310 ft (700 m)
- Time zone: UTC-5 (Eastern (EST))
  - Summer (DST): UTC-4 (EDT)
- GNIS feature ID: 1495402

Coaldan is an unincorporated community and coal town located in Tazewell County, Virginia, United States.
