= Paintlick, Virginia =

- Unincorporated community
- Location within Virginia Location within the United States
- Coordinates: 37°00′35″N 81°46′39″W
- Country: United States
- State: Virginia
- County: Tazewell

Government
  - Mayor: Shawn Lee Hill
- Elevation: 2,192 ft (668 m)
- Time zone: UTC-5 (Eastern (EST))
  - Summer (DST): UTC-4 (EDT)
- Area code: 276
- GNIS feature ID: 1497701

Paintlick is an unincorporated community located in Tazewell County, Virginia, United States.
