= Tiptop, Virginia =

- Unincorporated community
- Location within Virginia Location within the United States
- Coordinates: 37°12′39″N 81°26′02″W
- Country: United States
- State: Virginia
- County: Tazewell
- Elevation: 2,756 ft (840 m)
- Time zone: UTC−5 (Eastern (EST))
  - Summer (DST): UTC−4 (EDT)
- Area code: 276
- GNIS feature ID: 1487929

Tiptop is an unincorporated community located in Tazewell County, Virginia, United States. Tiptop was named for being the highest elevated point on the Norfolk and Western Railroad.

Nearby Tiptop was the Iron Lithia Springs resort, which opened in 1892. The Resort was home to mineral springs, hotel with a ballroom and bowling alley.
