= Cavitt's Creek at Lake Witten =

Coordinates: 37°10′17″N 81°30′40″W

Cavitt's Creek Park is a 300-acre park located at 750 Recreation Drive in North Tazewell, Tazewell County, Virginia. The lake is named for a local doctor and state politician. It features a 54-acre lake, stocked with fish; allows only non-motorized boats and has both full service and primitive camping. It is also a site for the Mountain Heritage Loop of the Virginia Birding and Wildlife Trail.
