= Sugar Grove, Virginia =

- CDP
- Location within the state of Virginia
- Coordinates: 36°46′27″N 81°24′35″W
- Country: United States
- State: Virginia
- County: Smyth

Area
  - Total: 2.9 sq mi (7.6 km^{2})
  - Land: 2.9 sq mi (7.5 km^{2})
  - Water: 0 sq mi (0.0 km^{2})
- Elevation: 2,585 ft (788 m)

Population (2020)
  - Total: 610
  - Density: 210/sq mi (81/km^{2})
- Time zone: UTC−5 (Eastern (EST))
  - Summer (DST): UTC−4 (EDT)
- ZIP code: 24375
- Area code: 276
- FIPS code: 51-76448
- GNIS feature ID: 1487691

Sugar Grove is a census-designated place (CDP) in Smyth County, Virginia, United States. The population was 610 at the 2020 census.

== Geography ==
Sugar Grove is located at 36°46′27″N 81°24′35″W.

According to the United States Census Bureau, the CDP has a total area of 2.9 square miles (7.6 km^{2}), all land.

== Demographics ==
Historical population
Census	Pop.	Note	%±
2000	741		—
2020	610		—
U.S. Decennial Census; 2000 2010 2020

Sugar Grove was first listed as a census designated place in the 2000 U.S. census.

As of the census of 2000, there were 741 people, 320 households, and 213 families residing in the CDP. The population density was 88.6 people per square mile (34.2/km^{2}). There were 365 housing units at an average density of 43.6/sq mi (16.9/km^{2}). The racial makeup of the CDP was 93.52% White, 4.99% African American, 0.13% Native American, 0.13% from other races, and 1.21% from two or more races. Hispanic or Latino of any race were 0.81% of the population.

There were 320 households, out of which 30.9% had children under the age of 18 living with them, 50.9% were married couples living together, 10.0% had a female householder with no husband present, and 33.4% were non-families. 28.4% of all households were made up of individuals, and 13.8% had someone living alone who was 65 years of age or older. The average household size was 2.32 and the average family size was 2.80.

In the CDP, the population was spread out, with 24.0% under the age of 18, 6.7% from 18 to 24, 30.9% from 25 to 44, 22.5% from 45 to 64, and 15.8% who were 65 years of age or older. The median age was 35 years. For every 100 females, there were 95.0 males. For every 100 females age 18 and over, there were 93.5 males.

The median income for a household in the CDP was $27,563, and the median income for a family was $31,065. Males had a median income of $21,607 versus $21,016 for females. The per capita income for the CDP was $14,172. About 7.9% of families and 11.1% of the population were below the poverty line, including 2.3% of those under age 18 and 6.9% of those age 65 or over.
