= Thompson Valley, Virginia =

- Unincorporated community
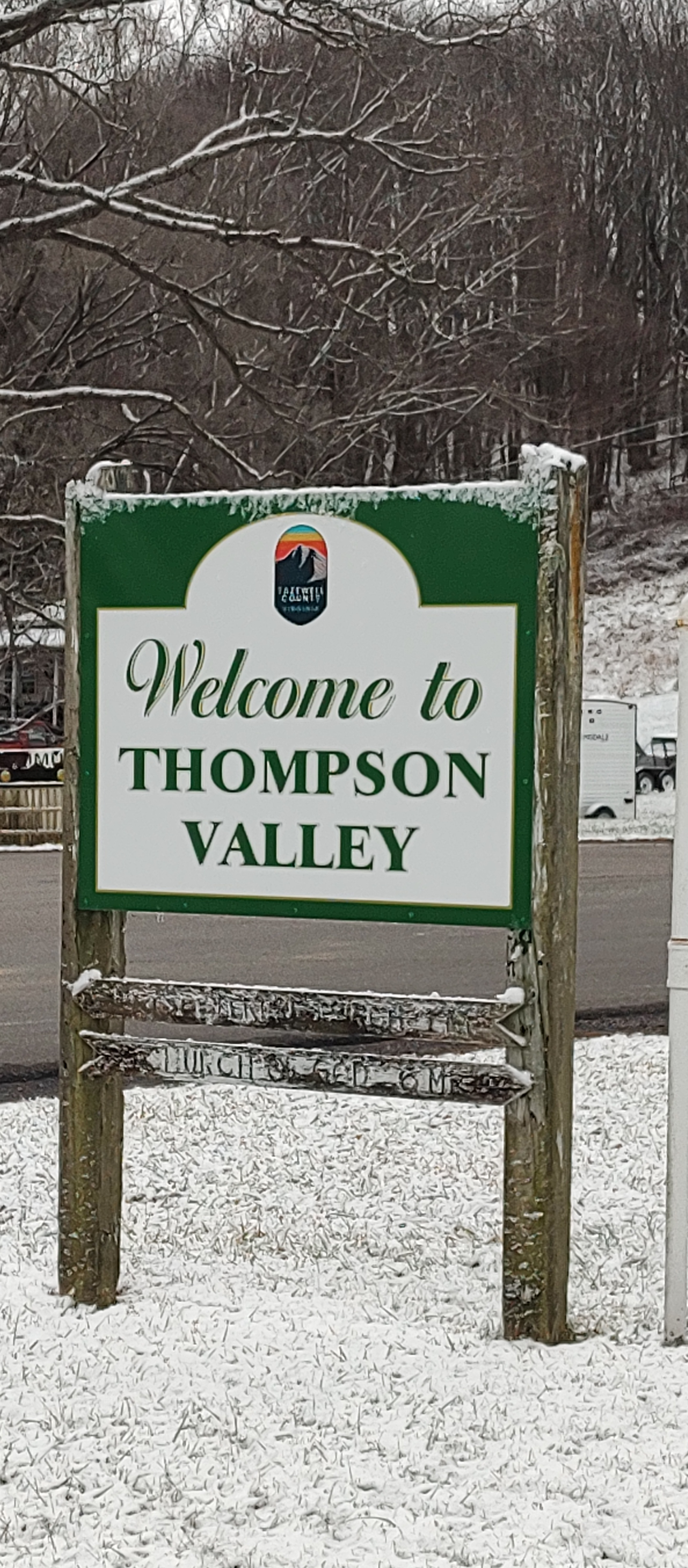

- Location within Virginia Location within the United States
- Coordinates: 37°04′42″N 81°32′51″W
- Country: United States
- State: Virginia
- County: Tazewell
- Elevation: 2,753 ft (839 m)
- Time zone: UTC−5 (Eastern (EST))
  - Summer (DST): UTC−4 (EDT)
- Area code: 276
- GNIS feature ID: 1487886

Thompson Valley is an unincorporated community located in Tazewell County, Virginia, United States.

It is named after William and Archibald Thompson, who first settled the community in the early 19th century.
