= Richlands, Virginia =

- Town
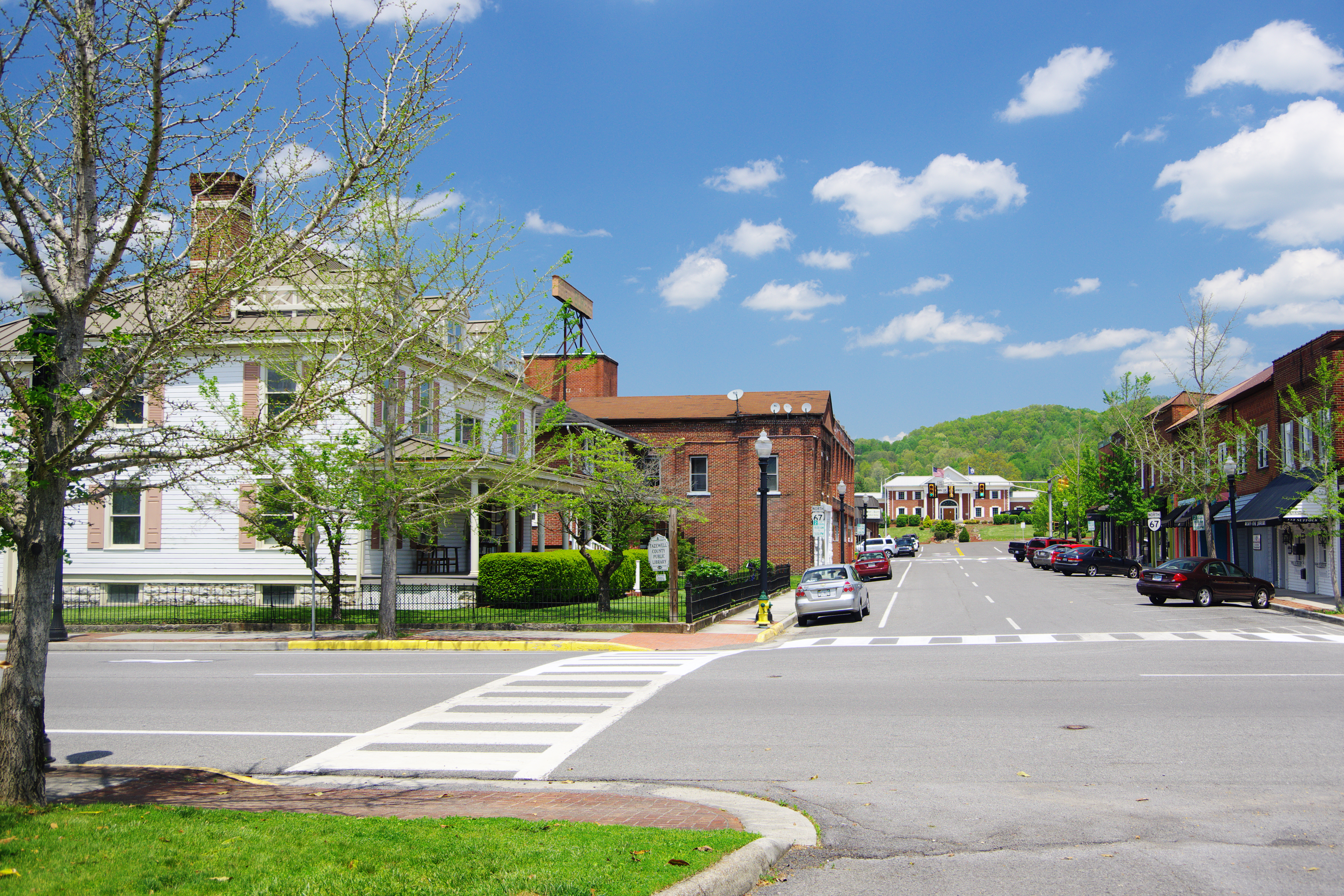
- Intersection of Front and Suffolk in Richlands

- Seal
- Motto: The Center of a Friendly Circle
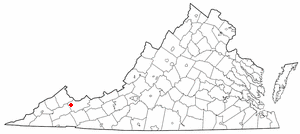
- Location in the Commonwealth of Virginia
- Coordinates: 37°5′40″N 81°48′22″W
- Country: United States
- State: Virginia
- County: Tazewell
- Incorporated: 1892

Government
  - Mayor: Rodney “Rod” Cury

Area
  - Total: 5.70 sq mi (14.77 km^{2})
  - Land: 5.65 sq mi (14.63 km^{2})
  - Water: 0.054 sq mi (0.14 km^{2})
- Elevation: 1,933 ft (589 m)

Population (2020)
  - Total: 5,261
  - Density: 926/sq mi (357.7/km^{2})
- U.S. Census Bureau, 2000 Population Estimates
- Time zone: UTC-5 (EST)
  - Summer (DST): UTC-4 (EDT)
- ZIP code: 24641
- Area code: 276
- FIPS code: 51-66928
- GNIS feature ID: 1473194
- Website: town.richlands.va.us

Richlands is a town in Tazewell County, Virginia, United States. The population was 5,261 at the 2020 census. It is part of the Bluefield, WV-VA micropolitan area which has a population of 107,578.

== History ==
Located along the banks of the Clinch River, Richlands began as a farming community and was named for its fertile "rich lands."

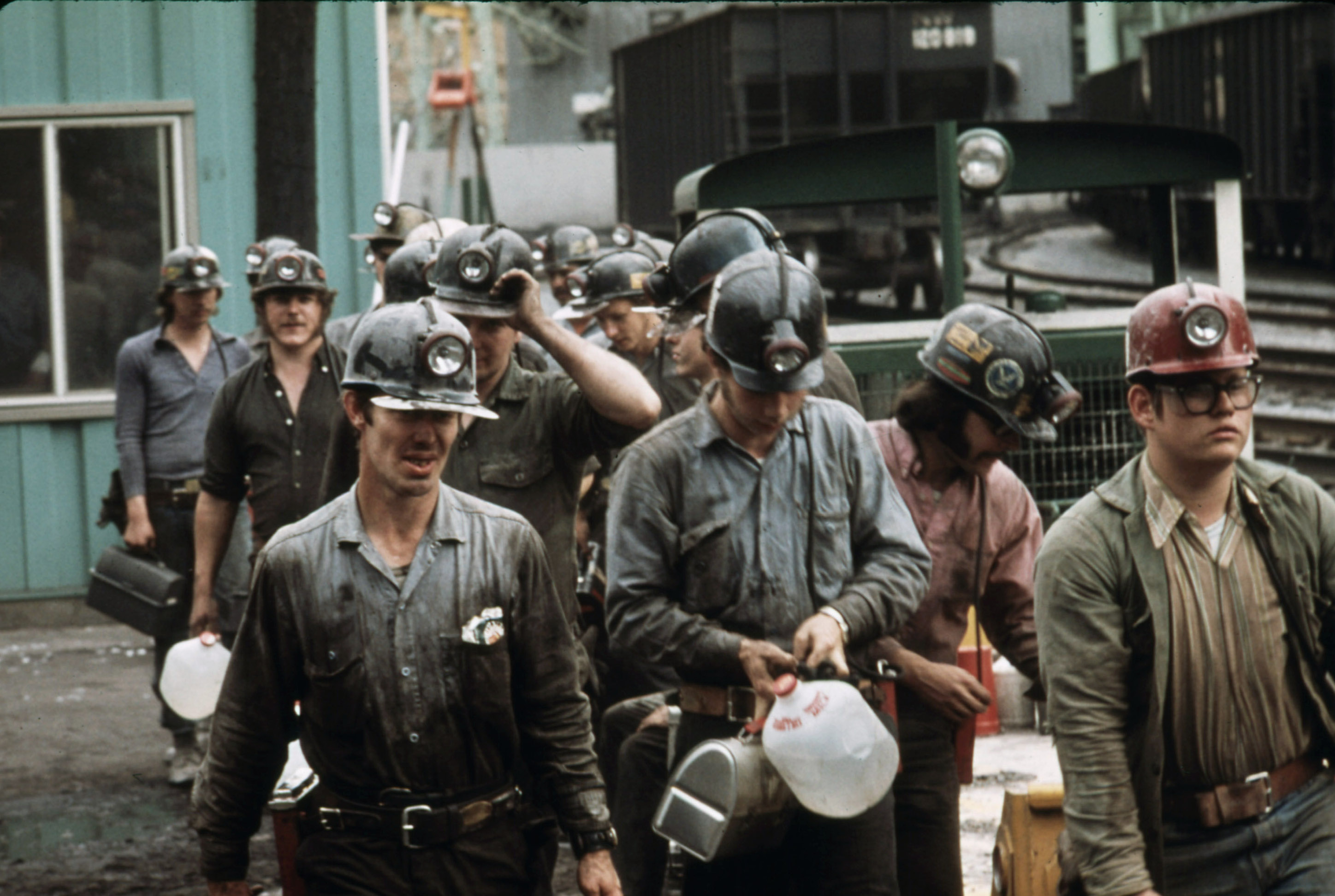
Miners at the Virginia-Pocahontas Coal Company Mine #4 near Richlands, 1974

The Clinch Valley Coal & Iron Company began to develop Richlands in 1890, and company officials hoped Richlands' readily available coal, iron, and timber might make it the "Pittsburgh of the South." The company abandoned its plans following the stock market crash of 1893.

In February 1893, Richlands was the site of a mass lynching of five black railroad workers after it was alleged some of the men had robbed and beaten a white man. Four of the railroad workers were arrested and held in the Richlands jail, but the jailor was overpowered by a mob of white townspeople, including James Hurt, a magistrate and member of the Richlands town council, and James Crabtree, a prominent businessman, who removed the four men and hanged them from the same tree. A fifth black railroad worker was later found and lynched.

The Richlands Historic District encompasses much of downtown Richlands, and the Tazewell Avenue Historic District, and Williams House, are both listed on the National Register of Historic Places.

== Geography ==
Richlands is situated along the Clinch River just east of the Tazewell-Russell county line. Cedar Bluff borders Richlands to the east, and the community of Raven lies just to the west. U.S. Route 460 and Virginia State Route 67 both traverse Richlands.

According to the United States Census Bureau, the town has a total area of 2.7 square miles (6.9 km^{2}), all land.

=== Climate ===
The Trewartha climate classification for Richlands is temperate oceanic due to five months of winter chill (monthly means below 10 °C (50 °F)), abbreviated "Do" on climate maps.

Climate data for Richlands, Virginia (1991–2020 normals, extremes 1989–present)
Month	Jan	Feb	Mar	Apr	May	Jun	Jul	Aug	Sep	Oct	Nov	Dec	Year
Record high °F (°C)	72 (22)	77 (25)	85 (29)	91 (33)	90 (32)	96 (36)	96 (36)	93 (34)	95 (35)	91 (33)	82 (28)	79 (26)	96 (36)
Mean daily maximum °F (°C)	44.1 (6.7)	47.7 (8.7)	55.7 (13.2)	66.1 (18.9)	74.1 (23.4)	80.4 (26.9)	83.2 (28.4)	82.7 (28.2)	78.1 (25.6)	67.8 (19.9)	57.1 (13.9)	47.6 (8.7)	65.4 (18.6)
Daily mean °F (°C)	33.4 (0.8)	36.5 (2.5)	43.2 (6.2)	52.5 (11.4)	61.3 (16.3)	68.9 (20.5)	72.3 (22.4)	71.4 (21.9)	65.7 (18.7)	54.3 (12.4)	44.0 (6.7)	36.8 (2.7)	53.4 (11.9)
Mean daily minimum °F (°C)	22.7 (−5.2)	25.2 (−3.8)	30.8 (−0.7)	38.8 (3.8)	48.6 (9.2)	57.4 (14.1)	61.5 (16.4)	60.2 (15.7)	53.4 (11.9)	40.8 (4.9)	31.0 (−0.6)	26.1 (−3.3)	41.4 (5.2)
Record low °F (°C)	−16 (−27)	−18 (−28)	−8 (−22)	19 (−7)	27 (−3)	37 (3)	46 (8)	42 (6)	32 (0)	20 (−7)	5 (−15)	−15 (−26)	−18 (−28)
Average precipitation inches (mm)	3.35 (85)	3.28 (83)	4.02 (102)	3.98 (101)	4.47 (114)	4.30 (109)	4.75 (121)	3.82 (97)	3.36 (85)	2.72 (69)	2.77 (70)	3.78 (96)	44.60 (1,133)
Average snowfall inches (cm)	6.3 (16)	4.4 (11)	2.9 (7.4)	0.3 (0.76)	0.0 (0.0)	0.0 (0.0)	0.0 (0.0)	0.0 (0.0)	0.0 (0.0)	0.0 (0.0)	0.3 (0.76)	3.4 (8.6)	17.6 (45)
Average precipitation days (≥ 0.01 in)	13.4	12.4	13.4	12.7	13.8	12.8	13.2	10.4	9.2	9.0	10.3	13.0	143.6
Average snowy days (≥ 0.1 in)	3.4	2.5	1.8	0.2	0.0	0.0	0.0	0.0	0.0	0.0	0.4	2.0	10.3
Source: NOAA

== Demographics ==
Historical population
Census	Pop.	Note	%±
1900	475		—
1910	743		56.4%
1920	1,171		57.6%
1930	1,355		15.7%
1940	2,203		62.6%
1950	4,648		111.0%
1960	4,963		6.8%
1970	4,843		−2.4%
1980	5,796		19.7%
1990	4,456		−23.1%
2000	4,144		−7.0%
2010	5,823		40.5%
2020	5,261		−9.7%
U.S. Decennial Census

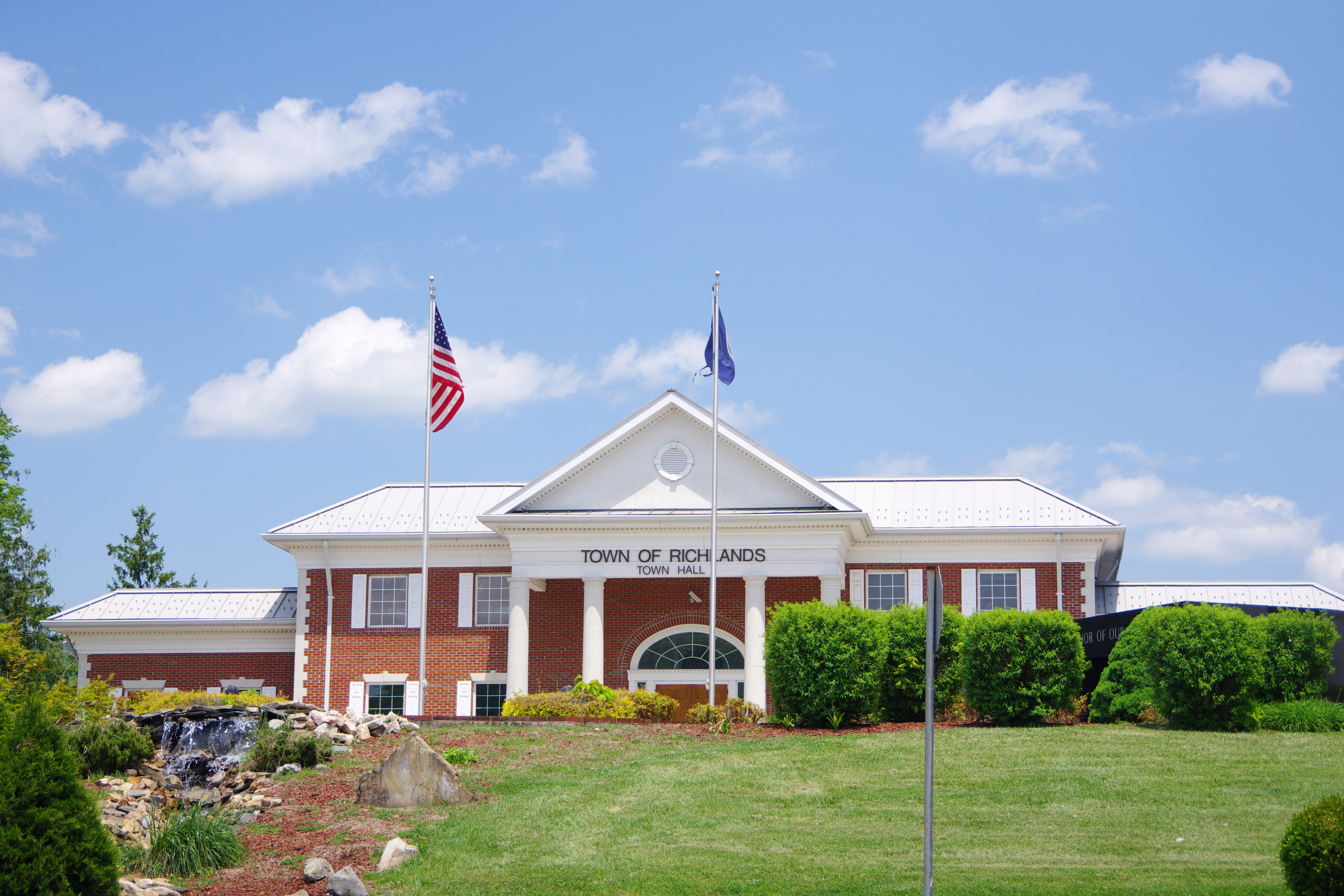
Richlands Town Hall

At the 2000 census there were 4,144 people, 1,882 households, and 1,223 families living in the town. The population density was 1,565.7 people per square mile (603.8/km^{2}). There were 2,137 housing units at an average density of 807.4 per square mile (311.4/km^{2}). The racial makeup of the town was 98.75% White, 0.05% African American, 0.12% Native American, 0.51% Asian, 0.19% from other races, and 0.39% from two or more races. Hispanic or Latino of any race were 0.34%.

Of the 1,882 households 25.2% had children under the age of 18 living with them, 48.7% were married couples living together, 12.8% had a female householder with no husband present, and 35.0% were non-families. 32.1% of households were one person and 15.6% were one person aged 65 or older. The average household size was 2.20 and the average family size was 2.76.

The age distribution was 20.1% under the age of 18, 8.3% from 18 to 24, 27.7% from 25 to 44, 25.4% from 45 to 64, and 18.5% 65 or older. The median age was 41 years. For every 100 females there were 81.9 males. For every 100 females age 18 and over, there were 79.0 males.

The median household income was $23,712 and the median family income was $30,257. Males had a median income of $30,682 versus $18,670 for females. The per capita income for the town was $15,548. About 13.6% of families and 17.8% of the population were below the poverty line, including 24.1% of those under age 18 and 16.9% of those age 65 or over.

== Education ==
Richlands is served by the Tazewell County Public School System. Schools in Richlands include:

- Richlands Elementary School
- Richlands Middle School
- Richlands High School

It is served by Southwest Virginia Community College, which is located in nearby Wardell, Virginia. King University, based in Bristol, Tennessee, has a satellite campus at SWVCC.

== In popular culture ==
Blues musician Mississippi John Hurt performed Richland Women Blues. The lyrics were risqué for the early 1930s, filled with sexual double entendres.

Virginian singer and pianist Bruce Hornsby wrote a song set in Richlands, entitled "The Road Not Taken". It appears on his 1988 album Scenes from the Southside.

== Notable people ==
- Mike Compton, a former guard for the Detroit Lions, New England Patriots, and Jacksonville Jaguars.
- Mark Gibson, a racing driver
- Cathryn Hankla, a poet and artist.
- Heath Miller, a former tight end and two-time Super Bowl Champion for the Pittsburgh Steelers.
- Jim Moody, a member of the U.S. House of Representatives from Wisconsin.
- Larry Wright (known better under the alias L. W. Wright), a confidence trickster who in 1982 posed as a stock car racing driver in the Winston 500 NASCAR race.
