= Raven, Virginia =

- CDP
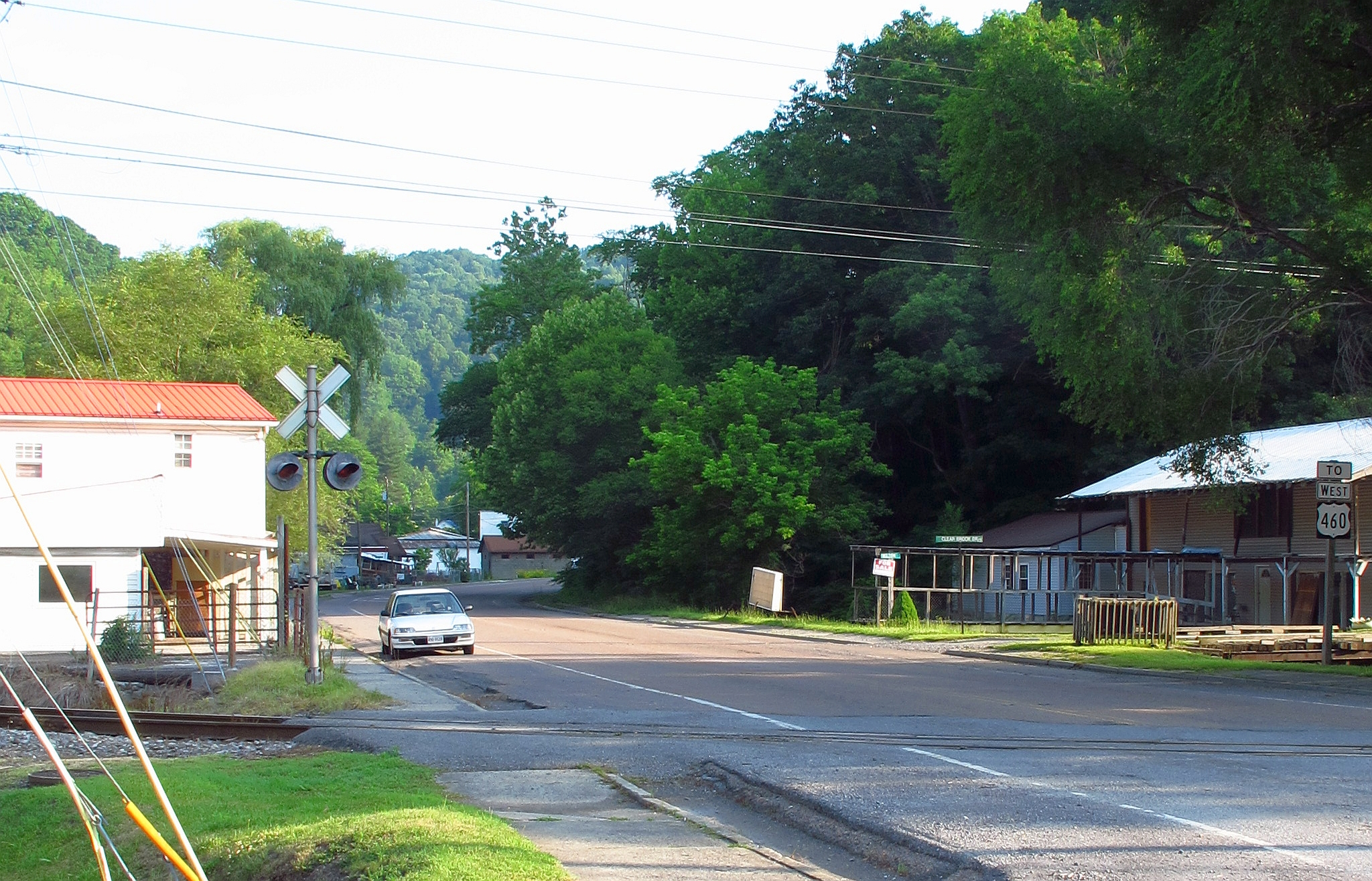
- Route 806 in Raven

- Location within Virginia Location within the United States
- Coordinates: 37°5′21″N 81°51′22″W
- Country: United States
- State: Virginia
- Counties: Russell, Tazewell

Area
  - Total: 6.8 sq mi (17.7 km^{2})
  - Land: 6.8 sq mi (17.7 km^{2})
  - Water: 0 sq mi (0.0 km^{2})
- Elevation: 1,913 ft (583 m)

Population (2026)
  - Total: 1,754
  - Density: 257/sq mi (99.1/km^{2})
- Time zone: UTC-5 (Eastern (EST))
  - Summer (DST): UTC-4 (EDT)
- FIPS code: 51-65744
- GNIS feature ID: 1473020

Raven is a census-designated place (CDP) in Russell and Tazewell counties in the U.S. state of Virginia. As of the 2020 census, Raven had a population of 1,988.

== Geography ==
According to the United States Census Bureau, the CDP has a total area of 6.8 square miles (17.7 km^{2}), all land.

== Demographics ==
Historical population
| Census | Pop. | Note | %± |
|---|---|---|---|
| 1970 | 1,819 | | — |
| 1980 | 4,000 | | 119.9% |
| 1990 | 2,640 | | −34.0% |
| 2000 | 2,593 | | −1.8% |
| 2010 | 2,270 | | −12.5% |
| 2020 | 1,988 | | −12.4% |
U.S. Decennial Census; 1970 1980 1990 2000 2010

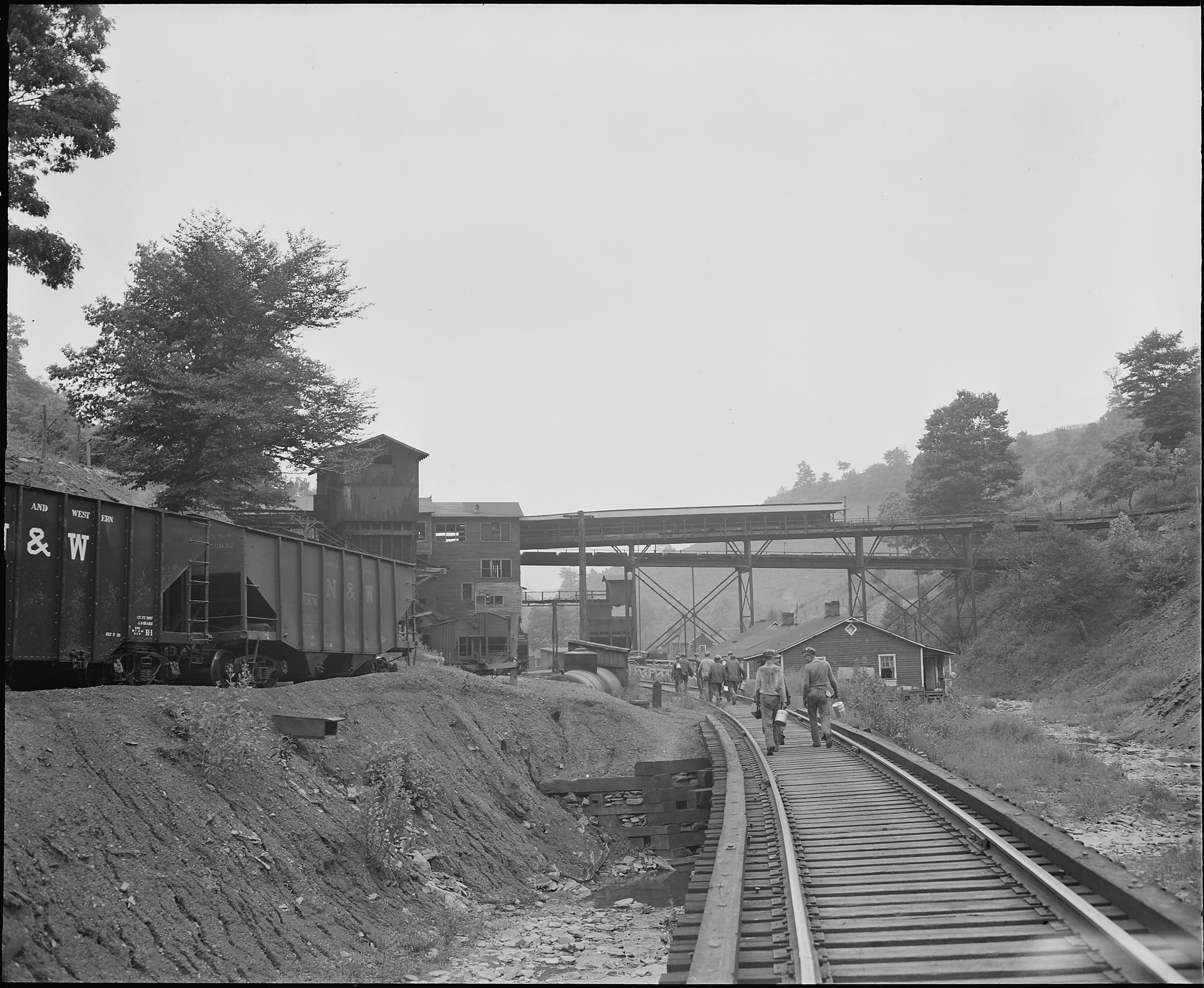
Miners walking home from Raven Red Ash Coal Company, 1946

Raven first appeared as an unincorporated community in the 1970 U.S. census; and then as a census designated place in the 1980 U.S. census.

=== 2020 census ===
As of the 2020 census, Raven had a population of 1,988. The median age was 48.1 years. 17.1% of residents were under the age of 18 and 22.8% of residents were 65 years of age or older. For every 100 females there were 99.4 males, and for every 100 females age 18 and over there were 103.6 males age 18 and over.

63.3% of residents lived in urban areas, while 36.7% lived in rural areas.

There were 879 households in Raven, of which 20.3% had children under the age of 18 living in them. Of all households, 43.0% were married-couple households, 16.8% were households with a male householder and no spouse or partner present, and 32.9% were households with a female householder and no spouse or partner present. About 30.8% of all households were made up of individuals and 14.8% had someone living alone who was 65 years of age or older.

There were 1,046 housing units, of which 16.0% were vacant. The homeowner vacancy rate was 3.8% and the rental vacancy rate was 12.2%.

Racial composition as of the 2020 census
| Race | Number | Percent |
|---|---|---|
| White | 1,900 | 95.6% |
| Black or African American | 2 | 0.1% |
| American Indian and Alaska Native | 3 | 0.2% |
| Asian | 0 | 0.0% |
| Native Hawaiian and Other Pacific Islander | 0 | 0.0% |
| Some other race | 7 | 0.4% |
| Two or more races | 76 | 3.8% |
| Hispanic or Latino (of any race) | 8 | 0.4% |

=== 2000 census ===
At the 2000 census, there were 2,593 people, 1,064 households and 774 families residing in the CDP. The population density was 379.5 per square mile (146.5/km^{2}). There were 1,219 housing units at an average density of 178.4 per square mile (68.9/km^{2}). The racial make-up of the CDP was 99.04% White, 0.04% African American, 0.08% Native American and 0.85% from two or more races. Hispanic or Latino of any race were 0.77% of the population.

There were 1,064 households, of which 30.6% had children under the age of 18 living with them, 55.5% were married couples living together, 13.1% had a female householder with no husband present and 27.2% were non-families. 24.4% of all households were made up of individuals and 11.7% had someone living alone who was 65 years of age or older. The average household size was 2.44 and the average family size was 2.88.

23.1% Of the population were under the age of 18, 9.1% from 18 to 24, 28.8% from 25 to 44, 26.3% from 45 to 64 and 12.6% were 65 years of age or older. The median age was 37 years. For every 100 females, there were 94.5 males. For every 100 females age 18 and over, there were 91.1 males.

The median household income was $19,104 and the median family income was $22,891. Males had a median income of $23,080 and females $19,327. The per capita income was $10,356. About 16.0% of families and 19.7% of the population were below the poverty line, including 25.6% of those under age 18 and 24.7% of those age 65 or over.
