= Tazewell County, Virginia =

County in Virginia, United States

- County
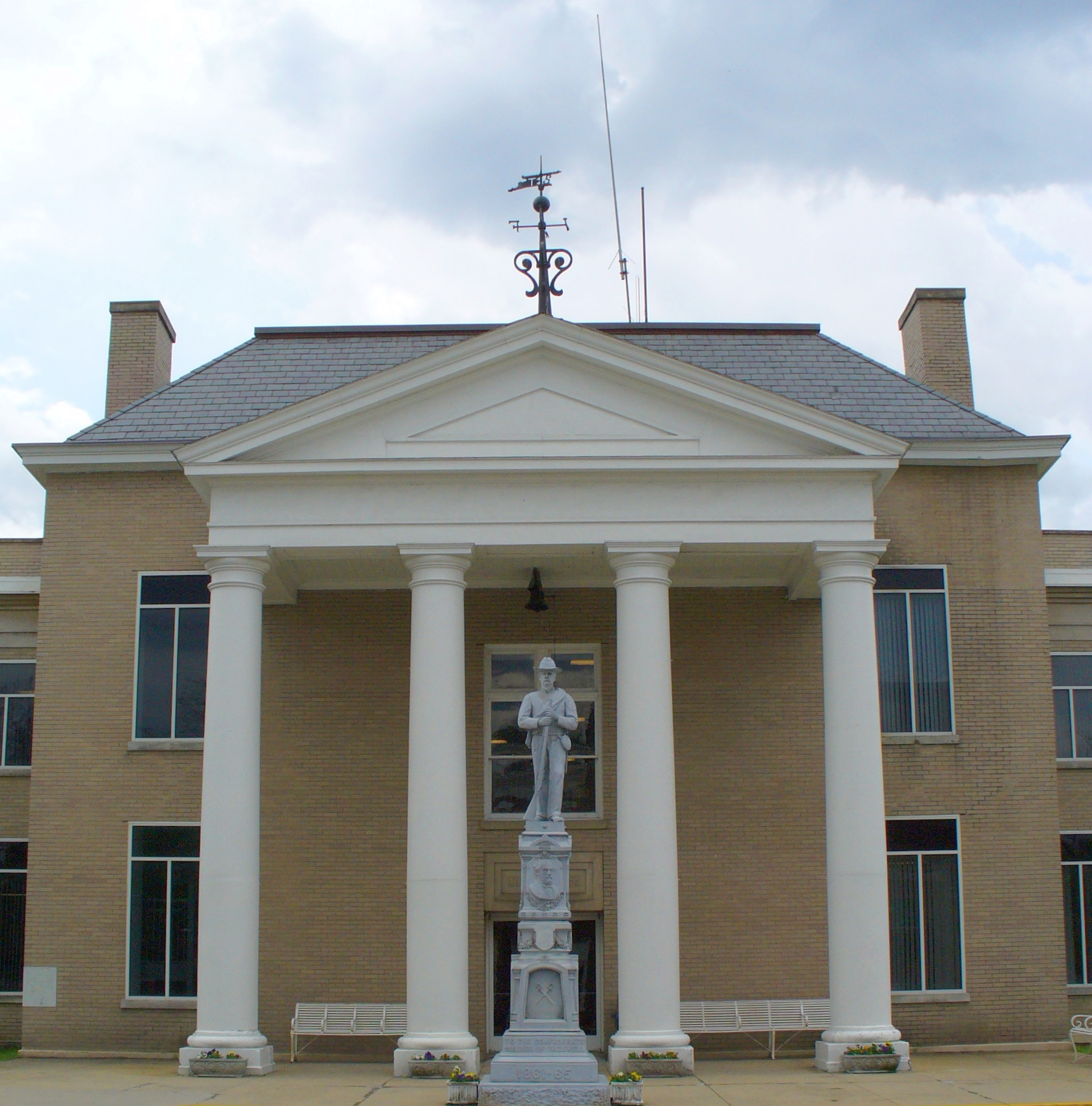
- Tazewell County Courthouse

- Flag Seal

- Location within the U.S. state of Virginia
- Coordinates: 37°08′N 81°34′W
- Country: United States
- State: Virginia
- Founded: December 20, 1799
- Named for: Henry Tazewell
- Seat: Tazewell
- Largest town: Richlands

Area
  - Total: 520 sq mi (1,300 km^{2})
  - Land: 519 sq mi (1,340 km^{2})
  - Water: 1.1 sq mi (2.8 km^{2}) 0.2%

Population (2020)
  - Total: 40,429
  - Estimate (2025): 38,635 ▼
  - Density: 77.9/sq mi (30.1/km^{2})
- Time zone: UTC−5 (Eastern)
  - Summer (DST): UTC−4 (EDT)
- Congressional district: 9th
- Website: tazewellcountyva.org

Tazewell County (/ˈtæzwɛl/) is a county located in the southwestern portion of Virginia, United States. As of the 2020 census, the population was 40,429. Its county seat is Tazewell.

Tazewell County is part of the Bluefield, WV-VA Micropolitan Statistical Area. Its economy was dependent on coal and iron of the Pocahontas Fields from the late 19th into the 20th century.

== History ==
Tazewell County was long a hunting ground for various historic Native American tribes and their ancestral indigenous cultures. Although rare in the eastern United States, there are petroglyphs near the summit of Paintlick Mountain.

In the spring of 1771, Thomas and John Witten established the first permanent settlement in Tazewell County at Crab Orchard.

As population increased in the area, Tazewell County was created on December 20, 1799. The land for the county was taken from portions of Wythe and Russell counties. It was named after Henry Tazewell, a United States senator from Virginia, state legislator and judge. Delegate Littleton Waller Tazewell originally opposed the formation of the new county but when Simon Cotterel, who drew up the bill to form the county, changed the originally proposed name of the county to Tazewell's namesake, in honor of his father Henry who had died earlier that year, the bill passed.

Jeffersonville was established the following year (1800) as the county seat. On February 29, 1892, Jeffersonville was renamed as Tazewell.

During the early settlement period, many Scots-Irish settled through the Appalachian backcountry, including Tazewell.

After the Civil War, construction of railroads in southwestern Virginia enabled the development of coal and iron resources in the Clinch Valley. Richlands had a boom economy in the early 1890s, and became a rougher place with young industrial workers and more saloons.

The profits generated by the coal boom resulted in the development of mansions and the elaborate Richlands Hotel, said to rival the best hotels of New York City. But it was forced to close after the boom cycle ended. It was used for other purposes.

Tazewell County was the focus of a 2005 article in Time Magazine about the opioid epidemic: however, the sheriff H. S. Caudill claimed the article misrepresented Tazewell County and his statements to the reporter.

== Representation in other media ==
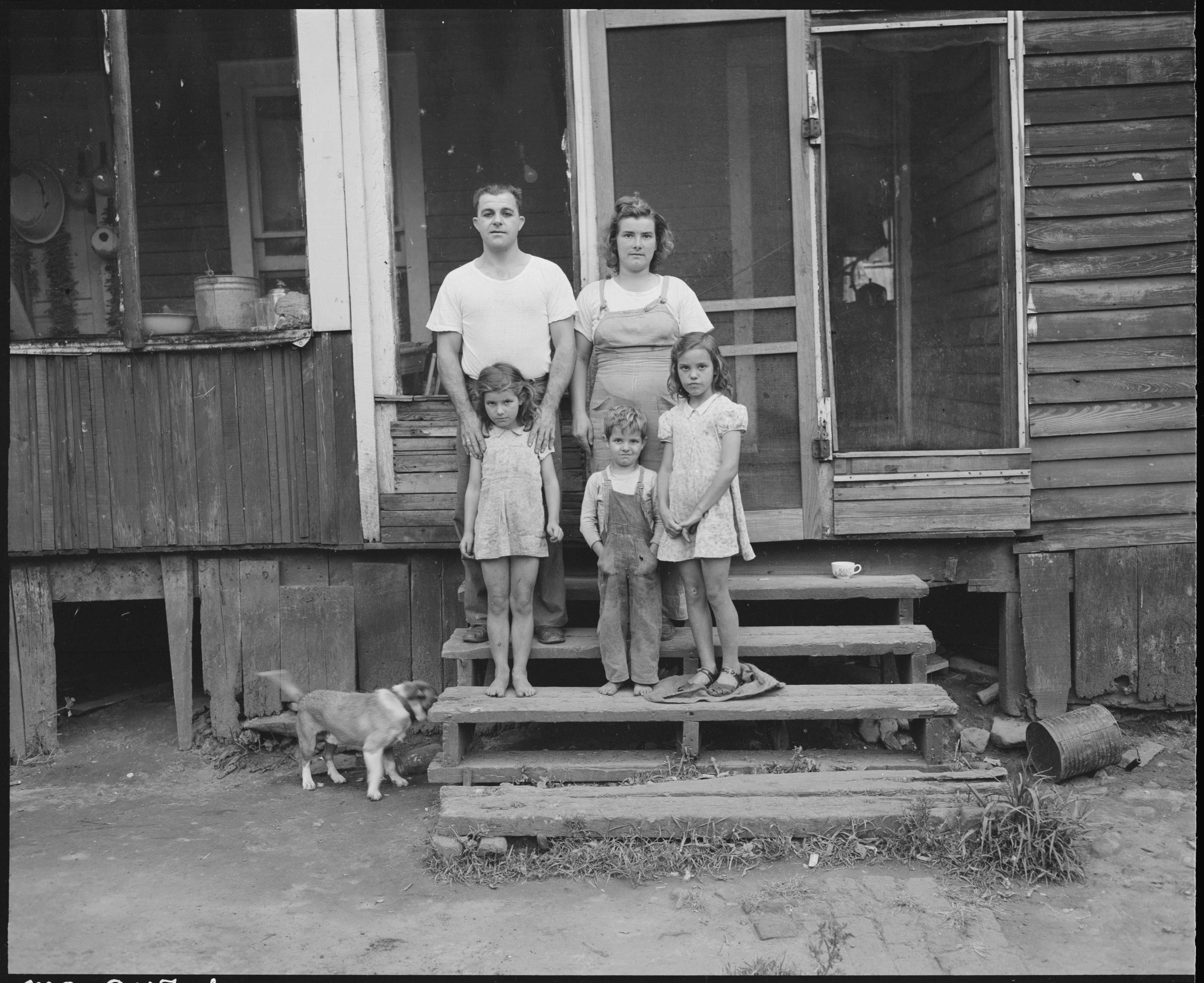
Miner James Wheeler, his wife and their three children in Raven, Tazewell County, a 1946 photograph by Russell Lee

Paramount's 1994 film Lassie was filmed here. It was based on stories of Albert Payson Terhune.

== Geography ==
According to the U.S. Census Bureau, the county has a total area of 520 square miles (1,300 km^{2}), of which 519 square miles (1,340 km^{2}) is land and 1.1 square miles (2.8 km^{2}) (0.2%) is water.

Since it contains portions of the Ridge-and-Valley Appalachians and the Cumberland Plateau, Tazewell County has very distinct geologic areas within the county. One of the most unusual areas is Burke's Garden, a bowl-shaped valley formed by the erosion of a doubly plunging anticline. Tazewell County includes the headwaters of four watersheds, which are the Upper Clinch, Middle New, North Fork Holston, and Tug. It also has the headwaters of the Bluestone River, which flows into West Virginia, where a portion is protected as a Wild and Scenic River.

=== Adjacent counties ===
- McDowell County, West Virginia (North and West)
- Mercer County, West Virginia (Northeast)
- Buchanan County (Northwest)
- Russell County (West)
- Smyth County (South)
- Bland County (East)

=== National protected area ===
- Jefferson National Forest (part)

=== Major highways ===
- US 19
- US 460
- SR 16
- SR 16 Alt.
- SR 61
- SR 67
- SR 91
- SR 102

== Demographics ==
Historical population
| Census | Pop. | Note | %± |
|---|---|---|---|
| 1800 | 2,127 | | — |
| 1810 | 3,007 | | 41.4% |
| 1820 | 3,916 | | 30.2% |
| 1830 | 5,749 | | 46.8% |
| 1840 | 6,290 | | 9.4% |
| 1850 | 9,942 | | 58.1% |
| 1860 | 9,920 | | −0.2% |
| 1870 | 10,791 | | 8.8% |
| 1880 | 12,861 | | 19.2% |
| 1890 | 19,899 | | 54.7% |
| 1900 | 23,384 | | 17.5% |
| 1910 | 24,946 | | 6.7% |
| 1920 | 27,840 | | 11.6% |
| 1930 | 32,477 | | 16.7% |
| 1940 | 41,607 | | 28.1% |
| 1950 | 47,512 | | 14.2% |
| 1960 | 44,791 | | −5.7% |
| 1970 | 39,816 | | −11.1% |
| 1980 | 50,511 | | 26.9% |
| 1990 | 45,960 | | −9.0% |
| 2000 | 44,598 | | −3.0% |
| 2010 | 45,078 | | 1.1% |
| 2020 | 40,429 | | −10.3% |
| 2025 (est.) | 38,635 | ▼ | −4.4% |
U.S. Decennial Census; 1790-1960 1900-1990; 1990-2000 2010 2020

=== Racial and ethnic composition ===
Tazewell County, Virginia – Racial and ethnic composition Note: the US Census treats Hispanic/Latino as an ethnic category. This table excludes Latinos from the racial categories and assigns them to a separate category. Hispanics/Latinos may be of any race.
| Race / Ethnicity (NH = Non-Hispanic) | Pop 1980 | Pop 1990 | Pop 2000 | Pop 2010 | Pop 2020 | % 1980 | % 1990 | % 2000 | % 2010 | % 2020 |
|---|---|---|---|---|---|---|---|---|---|---|
| White alone (NH) | 48,751 | 44,349 | 42,736 | 42,692 | 37,336 | 96.52% | 96.49% | 95.82% | 94.71% | 92.35% |
| Black or African American alone (NH) | 1,283 | 1,184 | 1,005 | 1,330 | 961 | 2.54% | 2.58% | 2.25% | 2.95% | 2.38% |
| Native American or Alaska Native alone (NH) | 39 | 46 | 69 | 54 | 56 | 0.08% | 0.10% | 0.15% | 0.12% | 0.14% |
| Asian alone (NH) | 127 | 244 | 271 | 286 | 213 | 0.25% | 0.53% | 0.61% | 0.63% | 0.53% |
| Native Hawaiian or Pacific Islander alone (NH) | x | x | 0 | 6 | 15 | x | x | 0.00% | 0.01% | 0.04% |
| Other race alone (NH) | 37 | 3 | 28 | 23 | 89 | 0.07% | 0.01% | 0.06% | 0.05% | 0.22% |
| Mixed race or Multiracial (NH) | x | x | 261 | 391 | 1,252 | x | x | 0.59% | 0.87% | 3.10% |
| Hispanic or Latino (any race) | 274 | 134 | 228 | 296 | 507 | 0.54% | 0.29% | 0.51% | 0.66% | 1.25% |
| Total | 50,511 | 45,960 | 44,598 | 45,078 | 40,429 | 100.00% | 100.00% | 100.00% | 100.00% | 100.00% |

=== 2020 census ===
As of the 2020 census, the county had a population of 40,429. The median age was 45.8 years. 18.7% of residents were under the age of 18 and 22.7% of residents were 65 years of age or older. For every 100 females there were 98.4 males, and for every 100 females age 18 and over there were 97.2 males age 18 and over.

The racial makeup of the county was 92.8% White, 2.4% Black or African American, 0.1% American Indian and Alaska Native, 0.5% Asian, 0.0% Native Hawaiian and Pacific Islander, 0.5% from some other race, and 3.6% from two or more races. Hispanic or Latino residents of any race comprised 1.3% of the population.

47.7% of residents lived in urban areas, while 52.3% lived in rural areas.

There were 16,966 households in the county, of which 24.9% had children under the age of 18 living with them and 28.6% had a female householder with no spouse or partner present. About 30.5% of all households were made up of individuals and 15.4% had someone living alone who was 65 years of age or older.

There were 19,814 housing units, of which 14.4% were vacant. Among occupied housing units, 73.4% were owner-occupied and 26.6% were renter-occupied. The homeowner vacancy rate was 2.3% and the rental vacancy rate was 9.0%.

=== 2000 census ===
As of the census of 2000, there were 44,598 people, 18,277 households and 13,232 families residing in the county. The population density was 86 people per square mile (33 people/km^{2}). There were 20,390 housing units at an average density of 39 units per square mile (15 units/km^{2}). The racial makeup of the county was 96.16% White, 2.29% Black or African American, 0.17% Native American, 0.61% Asian, 0.16% from other races, and 0.62% from two or more races. 0.51% of the population Hispanic or Latino of any race.

There were 18,277 households, out of which 28.70% had children under the age of 18 living with them, 58.20% were married couples living together, 10.80% had a female householder with no husband present, and 27.60% were non-families. 25.20% of all households were made up of individuals, and 11.90% had someone living alone who was 65 years of age or older. The average household size was 2.40 and the average family size was 2.85.

In the county, the population was spread out, with 21.40% under the age of 18, 8.40% from 18 to 24, 27.20% from 25 to 44, 27.50% from 45 to 64, and 15.50% who were 65 years of age or older. The median age was 41 years. For every 100 females, there were 92.00 males. For every 100 females age 18 and over, there were 88.70 males.

The median income for a household in the county was $27,304, and the median income for a family was $33,732. Males had a median income of $28,780 versus $19,648 for females. The per capita income for the county was $15,282. About 11.70% of families and 15.30% of the population were below the poverty line, including 20.30% of those under age 18 and 13.90% of those age 65 or over.

== Education ==
=== Colleges ===
- Bluefield University, Bluefield
- Southwest Virginia Community College, borders Russell County, near Richlands

=== Public high schools ===
All public schools in Tazewell County are operated by Tazewell County Public Schools system.

- Graham High School, Bluefield
- Richlands High School, Richlands
- Tazewell High School, Tazewell

== Communities ==
=== Towns ===
- Bluefield
- Cedar Bluff
- Pocahontas
- Richlands
- Tazewell

=== Census-designated places ===
- Abbs Valley
- Amonate
- Boissevain
- Claypool Hill
- Doran
- Falls Mills
- Gratton
- Jewell Ridge
- Pounding Mill
- Raven (partially in Russell County)
- Springville

=== Other unincorporated communities ===
- Bandy
- Baptist Valley
- Bishop (partial)
- Burkes Garden
- Frog Level
- Hidden Valley
- Liberty
- Maxwell
- North Tazewell
- Paintlick
- Pisgah
- Red Ash
- Tannersville
- Tiptop
- Thompson Valley
- Wardell

== Law enforcement ==
Tazewell County Sheriff's Office
- Abbreviation: TCSO

Jurisdictional structure
- Constituting instrument: Yes
- General nature: Local civilian police

Operational structure
- Headquarters: Tazewell, Virginia
- Agency executive: Brian Hieatt, Sheriff

Website
- Official Website

The Tazewell County Sheriff's Office (TCSO) is the primary law enforcement agency in Tazewell County. As of 2022 the agency is headed by Sheriff Brian Hieatt. Since the establishment of the Tazewell County Sheriff's Office, two prohibition officers, one justice of the peace, and one sheriff's deputy have died in the line of duty.

In 2016, the department was criticized by the Freedom from Religion Foundation for having stickers saying "In God We Trust" on its cars. In 2022, the department again received a letter from the FFRF, stating that Sheriff Hieatt led prayers at religious events in uniform, and criticizing it for posting religious messages on its Facebook page.

== Politics ==
United States presidential election results for Tazewell County, Virginia
| Year | Republican | | Democratic | | Third party(ies) | |
| Year | No. | % | No. | % | No. | % |
|---|---|---|---|---|---|---|
| 1912 | 586 | 23.80% | 979 | 39.76% | 897 | 36.43% |
| 1916 | 1,591 | 58.49% | 1,108 | 40.74% | 21 | 0.77% |
| 1920 | 2,408 | 57.51% | 1,770 | 42.27% | 9 | 0.21% |
| 1924 | 2,631 | 48.04% | 2,568 | 46.89% | 278 | 5.08% |
| 1928 | 3,072 | 60.82% | 1,979 | 39.18% | 0 | 0.00% |
| 1932 | 2,005 | 42.10% | 2,713 | 56.97% | 44 | 0.92% |
| 1936 | 1,981 | 39.66% | 2,992 | 59.90% | 22 | 0.44% |
| 1940 | 2,356 | 43.06% | 3,108 | 56.80% | 8 | 0.15% |
| 1944 | 2,271 | 44.29% | 2,832 | 55.23% | 25 | 0.49% |
| 1948 | 2,278 | 48.41% | 2,258 | 47.98% | 170 | 3.61% |
| 1952 | 3,232 | 55.83% | 2,527 | 43.65% | 30 | 0.52% |
| 1956 | 3,960 | 52.55% | 3,495 | 46.38% | 80 | 1.06% |
| 1960 | 3,139 | 41.44% | 4,416 | 58.30% | 19 | 0.25% |
| 1964 | 3,231 | 34.31% | 6,081 | 64.57% | 105 | 1.12% |
| 1968 | 4,434 | 39.11% | 4,734 | 41.75% | 2,170 | 19.14% |
| 1972 | 7,233 | 67.81% | 3,181 | 29.82% | 253 | 2.37% |
| 1976 | 5,565 | 41.41% | 7,565 | 56.29% | 309 | 2.30% |
| 1980 | 7,021 | 48.67% | 7,003 | 48.55% | 401 | 2.78% |
| 1984 | 9,645 | 53.89% | 8,014 | 44.78% | 237 | 1.32% |
| 1988 | 7,165 | 46.37% | 8,098 | 52.40% | 190 | 1.23% |
| 1992 | 6,375 | 37.38% | 8,586 | 50.34% | 2,095 | 12.28% |
| 1996 | 6,131 | 39.71% | 7,500 | 48.58% | 1,809 | 11.72% |
| 2000 | 8,655 | 52.96% | 7,227 | 44.22% | 462 | 2.83% |
| 2004 | 10,039 | 57.43% | 7,184 | 41.10% | 257 | 1.47% |
| 2008 | 11,201 | 65.65% | 5,596 | 32.80% | 264 | 1.55% |
| 2012 | 13,843 | 78.07% | 3,661 | 20.65% | 228 | 1.29% |
| 2016 | 15,168 | 81.70% | 2,895 | 15.59% | 503 | 2.71% |
| 2020 | 16,731 | 83.10% | 3,205 | 15.92% | 198 | 0.98% |
| 2024 | 16,711 | 83.95% | 3,030 | 15.22% | 165 | 0.83% |

== See also ==
- National Register of Historic Places listings in Tazewell County, Virginia
- Pocahontas coalfield
- Cavitt's Creek at Lake Witten
