= U.S. Route 460 in Virginia =

State highway in Virginia

U.S. Route 460
- US 460 highlighted in red

Route information
- Maintained by VDOT
- Length: 406.43 mi (654.09 km)
- Tourist routes: Virginia Byway

Western section
- Length: 79.59 mi (128.09 km)
- West end: US 460 near Big Rock
- Major intersections: US 19 at Claypool Hill
- East end: US 460 in Bluefield

Eastern section
- Length: 326.84 mi (526.00 km)
- West end: US 460 in Glen Lyn
- Major intersections: I-81 / US 11 in Christiansburg; Future I-73 / I-581 / US 220 in Roanoke; US 221 in Roanoke; US 29 / US 501 in Lynchburg; US 15 in Farmville; US 360 in Burkeville; I-85 / I-95 in Petersburg; US 13 / US 58 in Suffolk; I-64 / I-664 in Chesapeake; I-264 in Norfolk
- East end: US 60 in Norfolk

Location
- Country: United States
- State: Virginia
- Counties: Buchanan, Tazewell; Giles, Montgomery, Roanoke, City of Salem, City of Roanoke, Botetourt, Bedford, City of Lynchburg, Campbell, Appomattox, Prince Edward, Nottoway, Dinwiddie, City of Petersburg, Prince George, Sussex, Surry, Southampton, Isle of Wight, City of Suffolk, City of Chesapeake, City of Norfolk

Highway system
- United States Numbered Highway System; List; Special; Divided; Virginia Routes; Interstate; US; Primary; Secondary; Byways; History; HOT lanes
← SR 457	→ I-464

U.S. Route 460 (US 460) in Virginia runs east–west through the southern part of the Commonwealth. The road has two separate pieces in Virginia, joined by a relatively short section in West Virginia. Most of US 460 is a four-lane divided highway and is a major artery in the southern third of the state. From Petersburg to Suffolk, US 460 is a four-lane non-divided highway. It is a popular alternative to Interstate 64 (I-64) when going from Richmond and other points in central Virginia to the Currituck Sound and Outer Banks of North Carolina, avoiding the congestion and tunnels of the more northerly I-64 corridor. The road passes through several small towns that built up at stops along the railroad line.

US 460 from I-81 at Christiansburg west to Pikeville, Kentucky, including the piece in West Virginia, is Corridor Q of the Appalachian Development Highway System. From West Virginia east to I-81, US 460 also is part of the proposed I-73.

== Route description ==
=== Big Rock to Bluefield ===
US 460 enters Buchanan County from Pike County, Kentucky, within the Cumberland Plateau, a multi-state dissected plateau that is part of the Appalachian Mountains. The U.S. Highway heads southeast as a two-lane road parallel to Norfolk Southern Railway's Buchanan Branch in the narrow valley of the Levisa Fork of the Big Sandy River. US 460 passes by the communities of Conaway, Big Rock, and Artia before entering the town of Grundy, the county seat of Buchanan County, as Riverside Drive. The highway expands to four lanes and then becomes a divided highway as it approaches the center of Grundy, where the slopes of the hills have been blasted away to improve flood control, relocate highways to higher ground, and create more usable land for building. US 460 meets SR 83 (Edgewater Drive) at the confluence of Slate Creek and Levisa Fork. The two highways run concurrently south as a mix of two- and four-lane road through Tookland to Vansant, where SR 83 (Lovers Gap Road) splits west toward Clintwood. US 460 continues east as a four-lane divided highway through Deel, Janey, and Oakwood, the site of the Appalachian College of Pharmacy and where the railroad veers away from the highway. The U.S. Highway continues through Keen Mountain and Grimsleyville, between which the route leaves Levisa Fork near its headwaters. US 460 ascends to Shortt Gap, where the highway crosses Sandy Ridge. There, US 460 leaves the Ohio River watershed for the Tennessee River watershed, leaves the Cumberland Plateau for the Ridge-and-Valley Appalachians, and enters Tazewell County.

US 460 descends Sandy Ridge south along Coal Creek and passes through the community of Red Ash. The four-lane divided highway, named for George C. Peery, curves east and begins to parallel Norfolk Southern's Clinch Valley District rail line and the Clinch River at Raven, where the highway is paralleled by and is joined by SR 67. US 460 and SR 67 enter the town of Richlands; west of the downtown area, US 460 Bus. splits east with SR 67 onto Front Street. US 460 passes to the north of downtown and has a partial cloverleaf interchange with SR 67 (Railroad Avenue). The U.S. Highway continues into the town of Cedar Bluff and has a pair of right-in/right-out interchanges with its business route, here named Cedar Valley Drive. US 460 leaves the railroad and river, collects the eastern end of its business route, and heads south out of Cedar Bluff to Claypool Hill, where the highway intersects US 19 (Steelburg Highway).

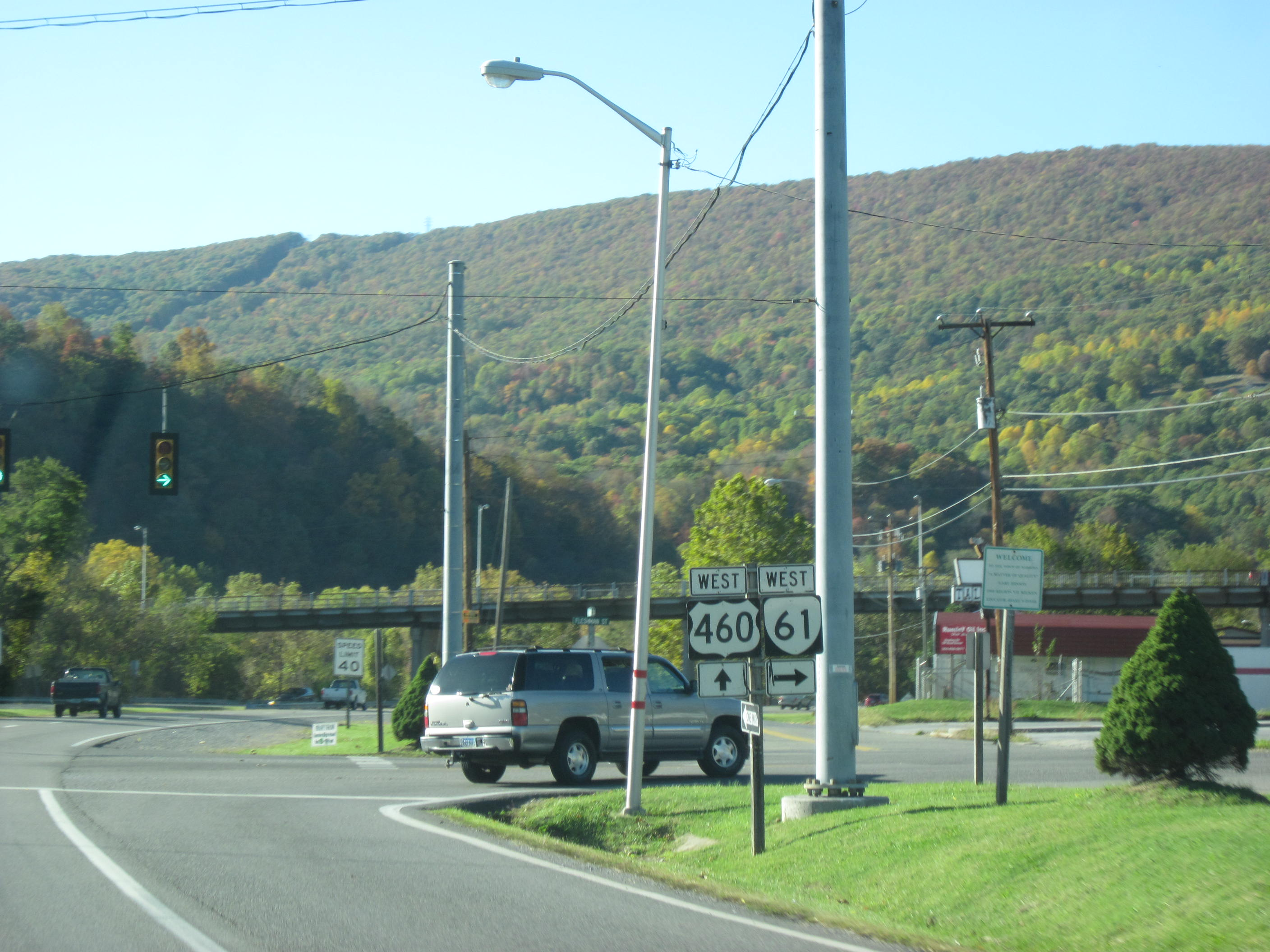
US 460 westbound at SR 61 intersection in Narrows

US 460 and US 19 head east along four-lane divided George C. Peery Highway, which is also named The Trail of the Lonesome Pine, through a long east–west valley between Paint Lick Mountain and Deskin Mountain to the south and Smith Ridge to the north. The U.S. Highways rejoin the Clinch River and the Clinch Valley District rail line at Pounding Mill. US 19 and US 460 head through Cliffield and Maxwell to Pisgah, where US 19 Bus. and US 460 Bus. split south along Crab Orchard Road toward Frog Level. The mainline highways have a partial cloverleaf interchange with SR 16 Alt. (Fairground Road) at the western town limit of Tazewell. US 460 and US 19 continue through a diamond interchange with SR 16 (Tazewell Avenue) and a partial cloverleaf interchange with SR 61 (Riverside Drive) at a crossing of the Clinch River and the railroad west of downtown Tazewell. At the northeast corner of town, the U.S. Highways have a pair of right-in/right-out interchanges with SR 645 and SR 678, cross the rail line, and have a partial interchange with the eastern ends of their business routes.

US 460 and US 19 continue east between East River Mountain to the south and Little Valley Ridge to the north; the highways leave the Tennessee River watershed and enter the valley of the Bluestone River, which is part of the New River watershed. The U.S. Highways follow the river through Springville to the town of Bluefield, at the west end of which US 19 (Trail of the Lonesome Pine) splits northeast at a trumpet interchange to pass through the centers of the twin cities of Bluefield, Virginia, and Bluefield. On the southern edge of the town, US 460 parallels SR 720 (Fincastle Turnpike and Valley Dale Street) and has a pair of partial cloverleaf interchanges with that highway; the eastern interchange leads to SR 102 (College Avenue). East of the latter interchange, US 460 enters West Virginia. The U.S. Highway serves that state's Bluefield and Princeton before re-entering Virginia near where the New River crosses the Virginia–West Virginia state line.

=== Glen Lyn to Christiansburg ===
US 460 re-enters Virginia at the town of Glen Lyn in Giles County at the northwestern end of the New River Valley region. The four-lane divided U.S. Highway, named Virginia Avenue throughout Giles County, crosses the East River, briefly parallels a bend in Norfolk Southern Railway's Christiansburg District, and crosses to the east side of the New River. US 460 follows the river around a bend into the town of Rich Creek, where the highway meets the southern end of US 219 (Island Street). The route follows the river south through a gap between East River Mountain to the west and Peters Mountain to the east to the town of Narrows, where the highway meets the eastern end of SR 61 (Fleshman Street). US 460 curves east and crosses the New River again into the county seat of Pearisburg; there, US 460 Bus. (Main Street) splits off at a trumpet interchange to serve downtown Pearisburg and connect with SR 100. East of the town in Ripplemead, the U.S. Highway meets the eastern end of US 460 Bus. (Wenonah Avenue) and SR 636 (Ripplemead Road) at a diamond interchange and crosses the New River and its parallel rail lines.

US 460 veers away from the New River and its rail lines at the town of Pembroke, through which the highway temporarily becomes undivided. The highway follows Sinking Creek to Newport, where the highway meets the southern end of the middle segment of SR 42 (Bluegrass Trail). East of Newport, US 460 ascends Sinking Creek Mountain, at the top of which the highway enters Montgomery County. The highway, now named Pandapas Pond Road, passes between the eponymous pond, which is the source of Poverty Creek, which flows west into the New River, and the headwaters of Craig Creek, which flows east toward the James River. US 460 next crosses over Brush Mountain, east of which the highway curves south at Toms Creek and enters the town of Blacksburg.

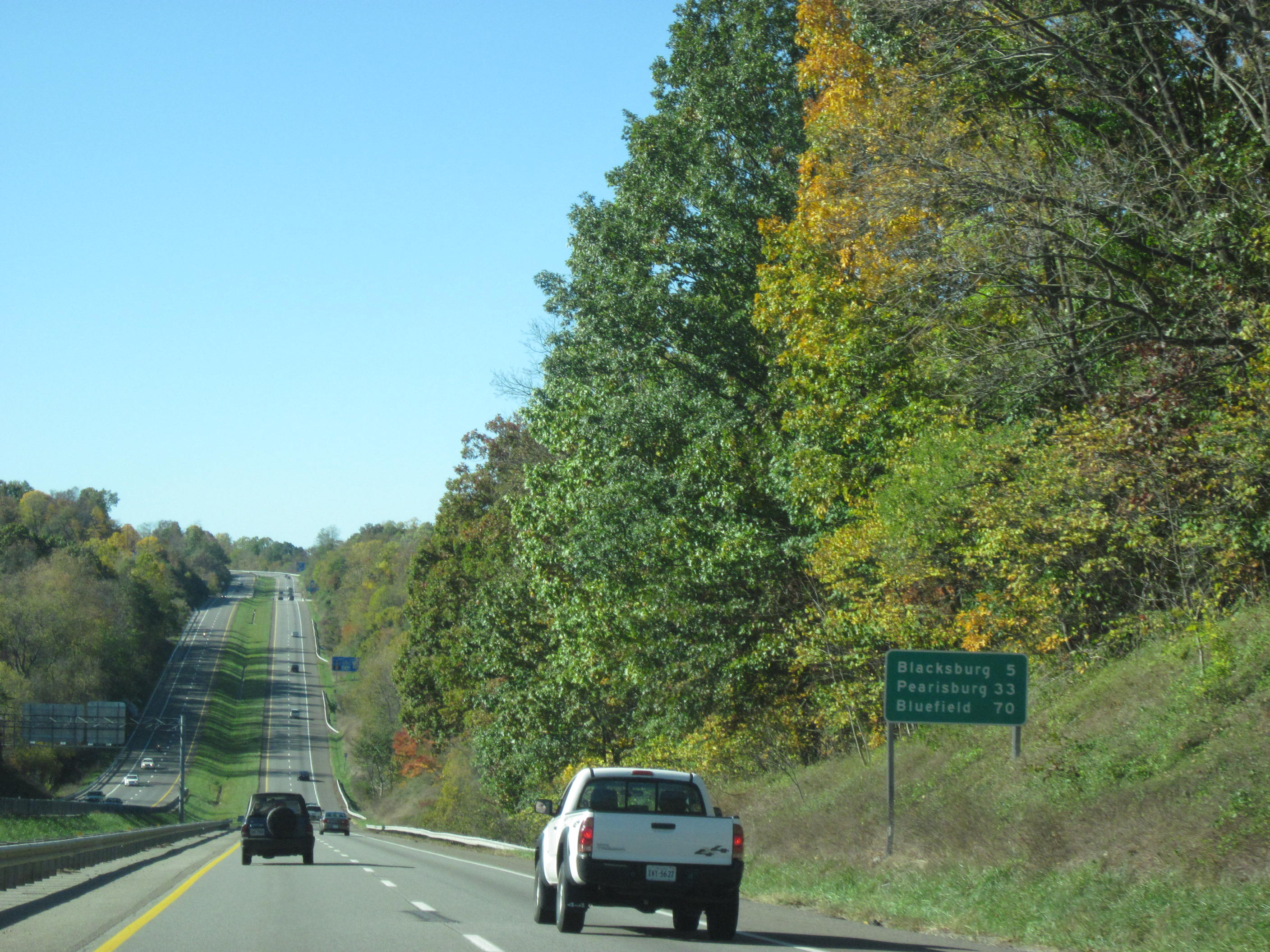
US 460 freeway westbound in Christiansburg

At the north end of town, the long US 460 Bus. that serves both Blacksburg and Christiansburg splits off along Main Street while US 460 bypasses downtown Blacksburg and Virginia Tech to the west. The four-lane freeway has partial cloverleaf interchanges with Toms Creek Road and Prices Fork Road, which heads east as SR 412 toward downtown Blacksburg and the center of the Virginia Tech campus. The freeway previously had one at-grade intersection: a junction with Southgate Drive (SR 314), which provided access to the Virginia Tech athletics facilities, including Lane Stadium and Cassell Coliseum; the Virginia–Maryland College of Veterinary Medicine; and a research park that contains Virginia Tech Montgomery Executive Airport. Construction started in the spring of 2015 on a new diverging-diamond interchange that replaced the at-grade Southgate Drive intersection. The new interchange is just south (east) of the current intersection and serves both the Virginia Tech campus and the Corporate Research Center via new roads and a relocated Southgate Drive (including two roundabouts). The project, which includes two bridges over US 460, opened in December 2017 one year earlier than estimated. At the southern edge of the research park, US 460 meets its business route (Main Street) at a complex interchange featuring many flyover ramps and a variety of direct and indirect connections to allow every movement between the two highways. Immediately to the east of the interchange is the western end of the Virginia Smart Road, a Virginia Department of Transportation facility that is not open to the public.

US 460 continues south parallel to its business route and enters the town of Christiansburg, the county seat of Montgomery County. The U.S. Highway has a partial cloverleaf interchange with the eastern end of SR 114 (Peppers Ferry Road) before it reaches another complex interchange with US 460 Bus. (Franklin Street). That interchange includes pair of flyovers from both directions of US 460 and a trumpet interchange to the north of Norfolk Southern's Christiansburg District and the business route's interchange with SR 111 (Cambria Street). US 460 bypasses the center of Christiansburg and crosses over the Christiansburg District rail line before meeting the business route again, this time concurrent with US 11 (Roanoke Street), at a diamond interchange just north of US 460's full cloverleaf interchange with I-81, which has collector-distributor lanes through the interchange. The US 460 roadway continues south of I-81 as Parkway Drive, and there are ramps from the southbound I-81 ramp to westbound US 460 and from US 11 to the ramp from eastbound US 460 to southbound I-81. The two directions of US 460 continue along the collector-distributor lanes of I-81 east to the Interstate's partial cloverleaf interchange with US 11 and the eastern end of US 460 Bus., where US 460 exits into a concurrency with US 11.

=== Christiansburg to Roanoke ===
US 460 and US 11 follow a four-lane road with center turn lane toward the eastern end of Christiansburg, where the highways cross the Eastern Continental Divide from the New River watershed to the Roanoke River watershed. This road, named Roanoke Road and Lee Highway, reduces to two lanes plus center turn lane and then two lanes westbound, one lane eastbound as it descends the Pedlar Hills, also known as Christiansburg Mountain. At the bottom of the descent, US 460 and US 11 expand to a four-lane divided highway and parallel the Christiansburg District rail line and Spring Branch to the stream's confluence with the South Fork of the Roanoke River at Shawsville. The U.S. Highways follow the rail line and South Fork through Elliston to its confluence with the North Fork to form the Roanoke River proper at Lafayette, just east of which the road enters Roanoke County. US 460 and US 11 continue east along the river valley between Poor Mountain to the south and Fort Lewis Mountain to the north through Glenvar until the valley opens into the broad Roanoke Valley as the road enters the independent city of Salem.

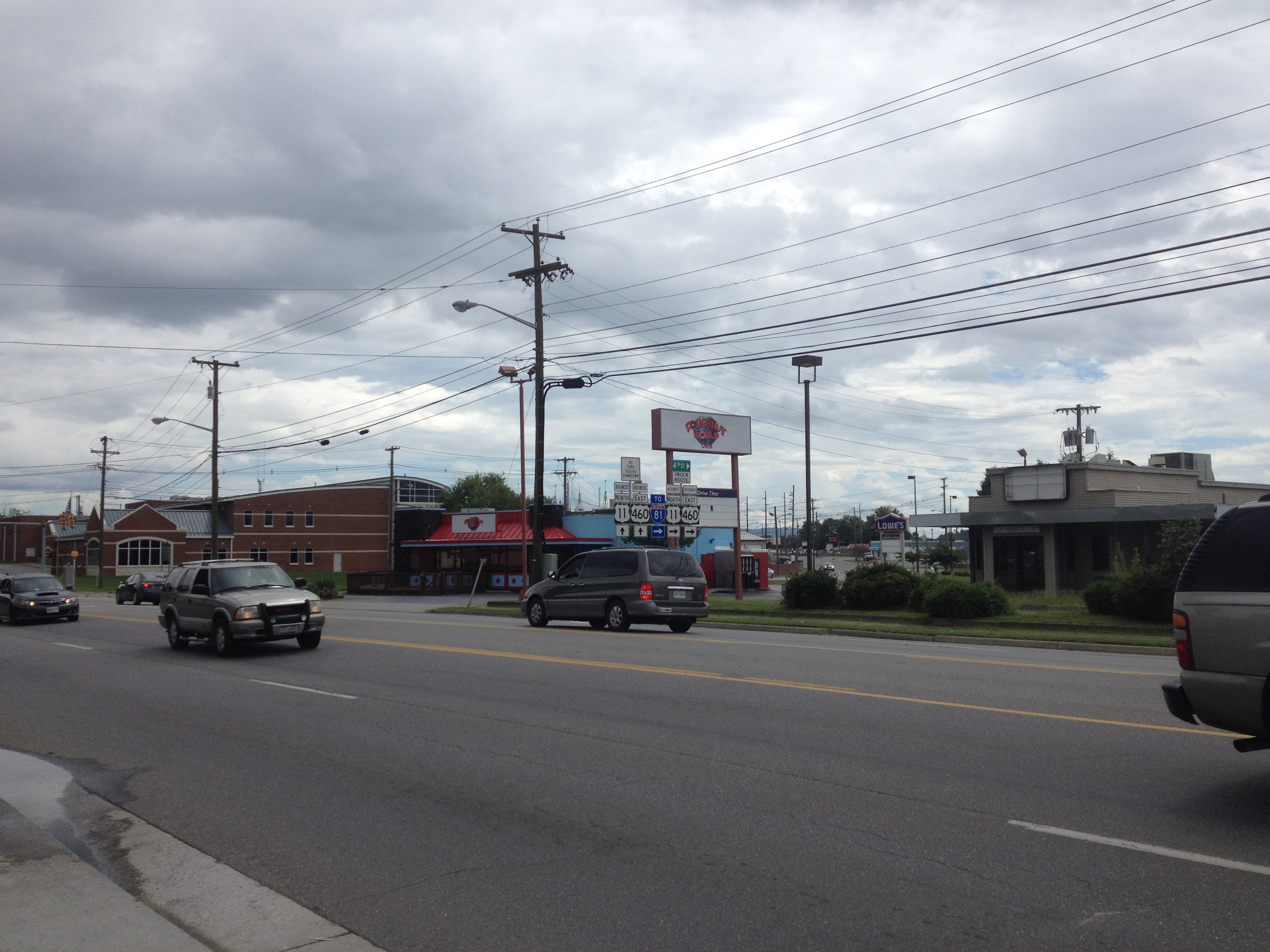
Northbound US 11/eastbound US 460 at the intersection with US 11 Alt./US 460 Alt. in Salem

US 460 and US 11 enter Salem along Main Street, a four-lane road with center turn lane. The highways intersect SR 112 (Wildwood Road), a connector with I-81, then pass the historic Preston House and veer away from the railroad and river west of their junction with US 11 Alt. and US 460 Alt., which veer southeast along Fourth Street. US 460 and US 11 continue along a two- or three-lane street past the historic McVitty Home before entering the Downtown Salem Historic District. Within downtown, the U.S. Highways pass the Salem Post Office and Salem Presbyterian Church before they diverge when US 11 turns south onto College Avenue; College Avenue to the north leads to Roanoke College, and the Main–College intersection is next to the Old Roanoke County Courthouse. One block to the east, US 460 intersects SR 311 (Thompson Memorial Drive). US 460 continues east past the Williams-Brown House and Store, Salem Presbyterian Parsonage, and Longwood Park and the western end of Lynchburg Turnpike. The U.S. Highway expands to a four-lane divided highway as it crosses a rail spur and intersects SR 419 (Electric Road), where US 460 Alt. ends and US 11 Alt. joins US 460 east out of Salem.

US 460 and US 11 Alt. enter the independent city of Roanoke as Melrose Avenue. The highways intersect SR 117 (Peters Creek Road) and intersect and become concurrent with SR 116 (Lafayette Boulevard) on the west side of Roanoke. On the western edge of the Melrose-Rugby neighborhood, US 460, US 11 Alt., and SR 116 reduce to three lanes. The highways veer onto Salem Turnpike to shift from Melrose Avenue to Orange Avenue. The street becomes four lanes again at 11th Street, then it passes along the southern end of the Washington Park before expanding back to divided highway ahead of the cloverleaf interchange with I-581 and US 220. At I-581, road gains a fourth route, US 220 Alt.; gains an additional lane in each direction; and passes to the north of the Roanoke Civic Center. The next intersection, US 11 (Williamson Road), serves as the eastern terminus of US 11 Alt. In addition, SR 116 turns south toward Downtown Roanoke and US 221 joins US 460 and US 220 Alt. from Downtown Roanoke. US 460, US 221, and US 220 Alt. continue east with six lanes. The highways pass under Norfolk Southern's Roanoke District, meet the southern end of SR 115 (Hollins Road), and drop to four lanes before crossing Tinker Creek. The routes curve northeast and pass historic Mount Moriah Baptist Church and Cemetery before leaving the city of Roanoke and re-entering Roanoke County, where US 220 Alt. splits north onto Cloverdale Road at Bonsack between Read Mountain to the west and the spine of the Blue Ridge Mountains to the east.

=== Roanoke to Lynchburg (Salem-Lynchburg Turnpike) ===
US 460 and US 221 continue northeast into Botetourt County along four-lane divided Blue Ridge Boulevard. The highways pass by the hamlet of Coyner Springs to the east of Coyner Mountain and through the community of Laymantown, where they meet the Blue Ridge Parkway at a partial cloverleaf interchange. US 460 and US 221 continue through the community of Blue Ridge and parallel Norfolk Southern Railway's Blue Ridge District across the spine of the Blue Ridge at low and wide Buford's Gap, just south of which the routes enter Bedford County. US 460 and US 221 gradually curve east as Lynchburg Salem Turnpike, parallel the South Folk of Goose Creek, and pass through the communities of Villamont and Montvale, between which the U.S. Highways pass to the south of the railroad. The routes cross the North Fork of Goose Creek just north of its confluence with the South Fork to form the main stream, then the carriageways briefly split wide where they and Goose Creek pass between Porters Mountain to the south and Taylors Mountain to the north as the U.S. Highways leave the Blue Ridge Mountains and enter the Virginia Piedmont.

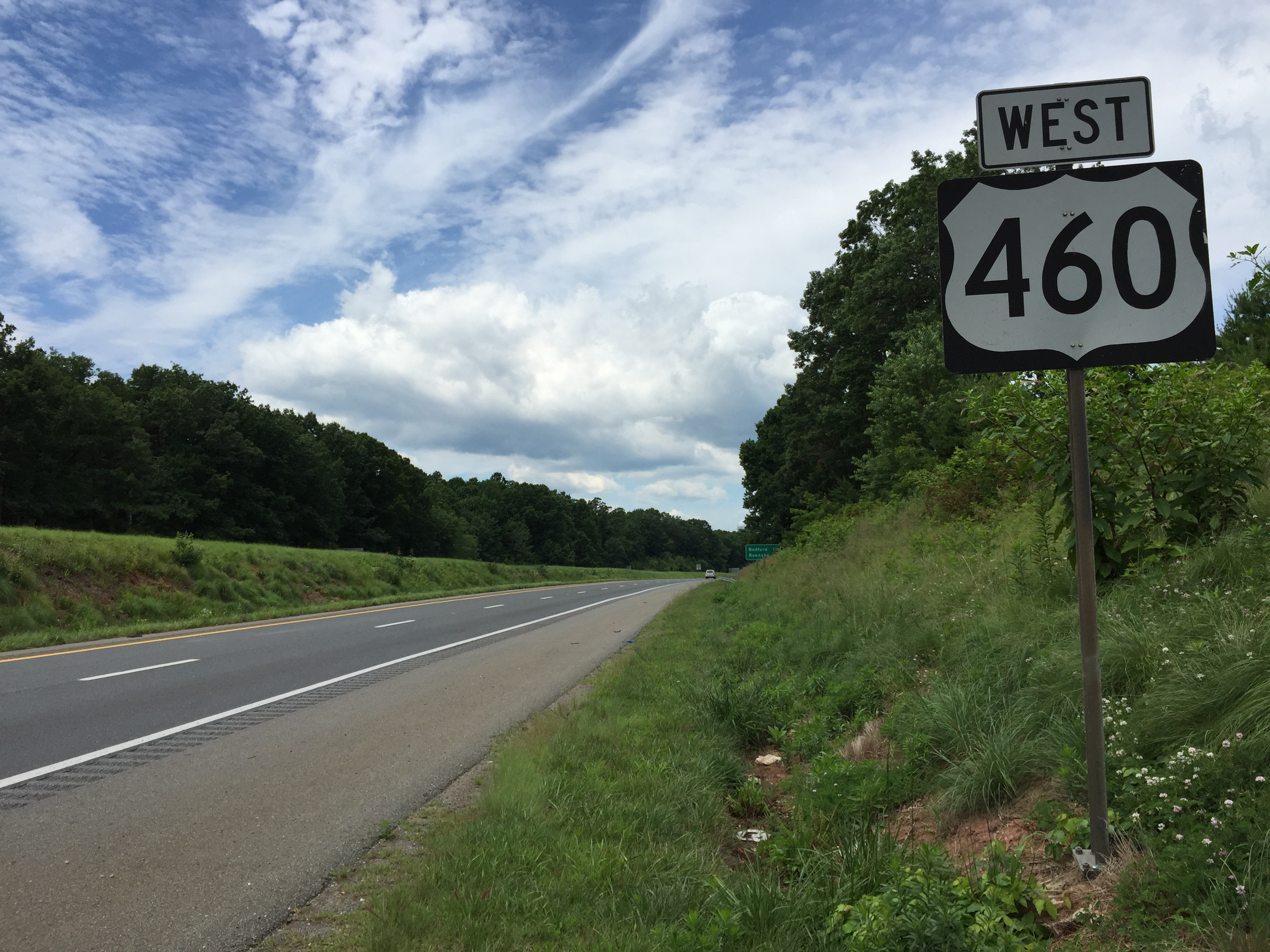
View west along US 460 west of SR 682 in Timberlake, Campbell County

US 460 and US 221 parallel the Blue Ridge District rail line through Irving and Thaxton to the town of Bedford. At the west end of town, the U.S. Highways have a partial interchange with US 460 Bus. (Blue Ridge Avenue), which parallels the railroad toward downtown Bedford, where it intersects SR 43; the interchange has no direct access from the westbound business route to the eastbound U.S. Highways. US 460 and US 221 bypass the center of town to the south, where they have a diamond interchange with SR 122 (Burks Hill Road), which joins the U.S. Highways heading east, and its business route, which provides access to the National D-Day Memorial. The three highways pass under SR 43 (South Street) with no access before receiving the other end of US 460 Bus. (Main Street) at a diamond interchange at the east end of Bedford where US 221 and SR 122 exit north to serve the east side of the town.

US 460 continues through eastern Bedford County, crossing the Big Otter River on its way to the hamlet of New London on the east side of the Campbell County line, where the route's name becomes Lynchburg Highway. The highway becomes a freeway at its trumpet interchange with US 460 Bus. (Timberlake Road) on the southern edge of the Lynchburg suburb of Timberlake. US 460 has a diamond interchange with SR 682 (Leesville Road) then curves northeast and has a diamond interchange with SR 678 (Airport Road) on the west side of Lynchburg Regional Airport. North of the airport, the route has a cloverleaf interchange with Wards Road, which heads south as US 29 and north as US 29 Bus. Immediately to the north of the junction, US 460 and US 29 cross over Norfolk Southern's Danville District rail line and enter the independent city of Lynchburg.

US 460 and US 29 head north along the western slope of Candlers Mountain through the campus of Liberty University. Access to the university is via five widely spaced ramps: a northbound entrance ramp from Liberty Mountain Drive, a northbound exit for Candlers Mountain Road, a southbound right-in/right-out interchange with University Boulevard near Williams Stadium, and a southbound entrance ramp from Champion Circle near the Vines Center. North of Candlers Mountain Road, US 460 and US 29 have a directional T interchange with US 501. The three U.S. Highway continue northeast across Norfolk Southern's Durham District rail line to the end of the freeway at a partial cloverleaf interchange with Campbell Avenue, which carries US 501 southeast toward Rustburg and US 460 Bus. and US 501 Bus. west toward downtown Lynchburg.

=== Lynchburg to Petersburg (Richmond Highway) ===
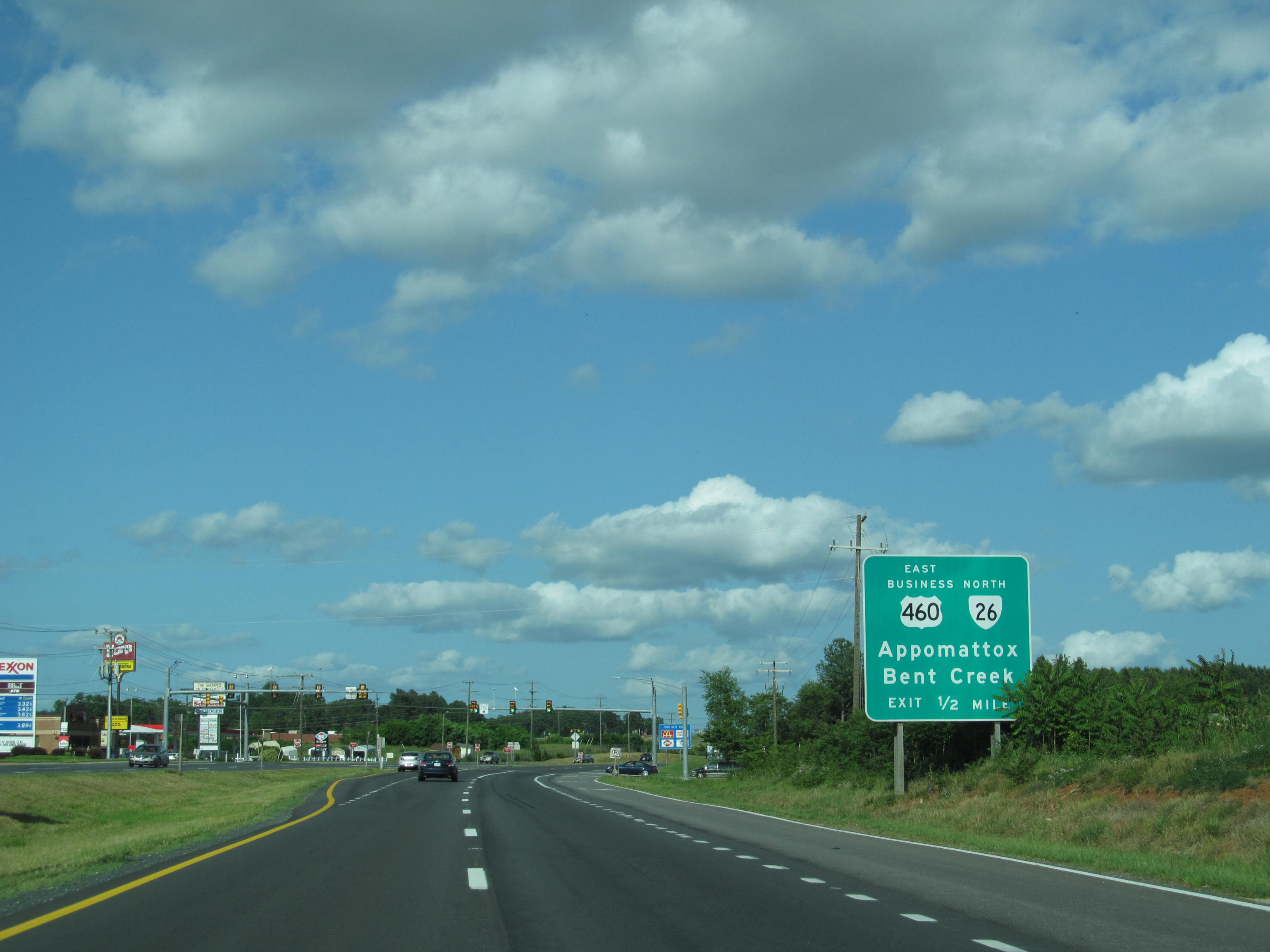
US 460 eastbound approaching interchange with US 460 Bus./SR 26 in Appomattox

US 460 and US 29 continue along four-lane divided Richmond Highway, which heads east past Falwell Airport and across Norfolk Southern's Blue Ridge District. The U.S. Highway diverge at a large trumpet interchange at the eastern city limit of Lynchburg. US 460 briefly parallels the CSX rail line that follows the south bank of the James River before the railroad and river veer north. The highway has a trumpet interchange with SR 726 (Mount Athos Road) at Kelly and crosses Beaver Creek as it heads southeast to Concord at the Appomattox County line, where SR 24 (Village Highway) joins the U.S. Highway. US 460 and SR 24 continue east parallel to the Blue Ridge District rail line through Spout Spring to the town of Appomattox. US 460 Bus. (Confederate Boulevard) splits south toward the center of town at a diamond interchange that also marks the southern terminus of SR 26 (Oakville Road). SR 24 (Old Courthouse Road) splits northeast toward Appomattox Court House National Historical Park and US 60; SR 131 heads southwest toward the center of town in the opposite direction. US 460 continues along the east side of town before it collects the other end of US 460 Bus. (Confederate Boulevard) at a partial interchange that has no ramp from the eastbound business route to westbound US 460.

US 460 continues southeast through Evergreen and briefly rejoins the railroad at Flood. The US 460 Bus. serving Pamplin City, which provides access to SR 47, splits southeast along the road while US 460 curves east and enters Prince Edward County. The U.S. Highway collects its business route at Shields and continues east as Prince Edward Highway through Elam to Prospect, east of which the railroad and highway diverge. The Farmville edition of US 460 Bus. splits at a trumpet interchange near Dowdy Corner; US 15 (Sheppards Road) joins US 460 on the freeway bypass. The U.S. Highways cross over Buffalo Creek and US 15 diverges at a diamond interchange south of town; US 15 Bus. heads north along Farmville Road into the county seat. US 460 collects the eastern end of its business route, which follows Third Street, at a partial interchange at the east town limit.

US 460 crosses the Bush and Sandy rivers on its way to Rice, where SR 307 (Holly Farms Road) splits east while US 460 veers southeast; SR 307 provides a shortcut to US 360 to Richmond. The U.S. Highway enters Nottoway County before it reaches a junction with US 360 (Patrick Henry Highway) on the west side of Burkeville. The junction is a partial trumpet interchange with an intersection with the west end of the fully concurrent US 360 Bus. and US 460 Bus. (Second Street); there is no direct access from eastbound US 460 to westbound US 360 or from the westbound U.S. Highways to the business route. US 460 and US 360 loop around the northern edge of town and collect the dual business routes at the east town limit, just west of their bridge across Norfolk Southern's Richmond District. East of the railroad, the U.S. Highways diverge at a partial interchange; access from westbound US 460 to eastbound US 360 and from westbound US 360 to eastbound US 460 is via SR 723 (Lewiston Plank Road).

US 460 continues east parallel to Norfolk Southern's Blue Ridge District into the town of Crewe, where the highway follows Virginia Avenue. East of SR 49 (Watsons Wood Road), the two highways reduce to a two-lane road with center turn lane and parallel the Crewe rail yard that separates Norfolk Southern's Blue Ridge and Norfolk districts. In the center of town, SR 49 splits south onto The Falls Road. US 460 expands back to a four-lane divided highway at the east end of town. The U.S. Highway parallels the railroad to east of its trumpet interchange with the west end of US 460 Bus. (Old Nottoway Road) at the county seat of Nottoway. US 460 passes along the northern edge of the town of Blackstone, where it has a diamond interchange with SR 606 (Cottage Road), and picks up the railroad again at its intersection with the eastern end of the business route, Cox Road, on the north side of Fort Barfoot.

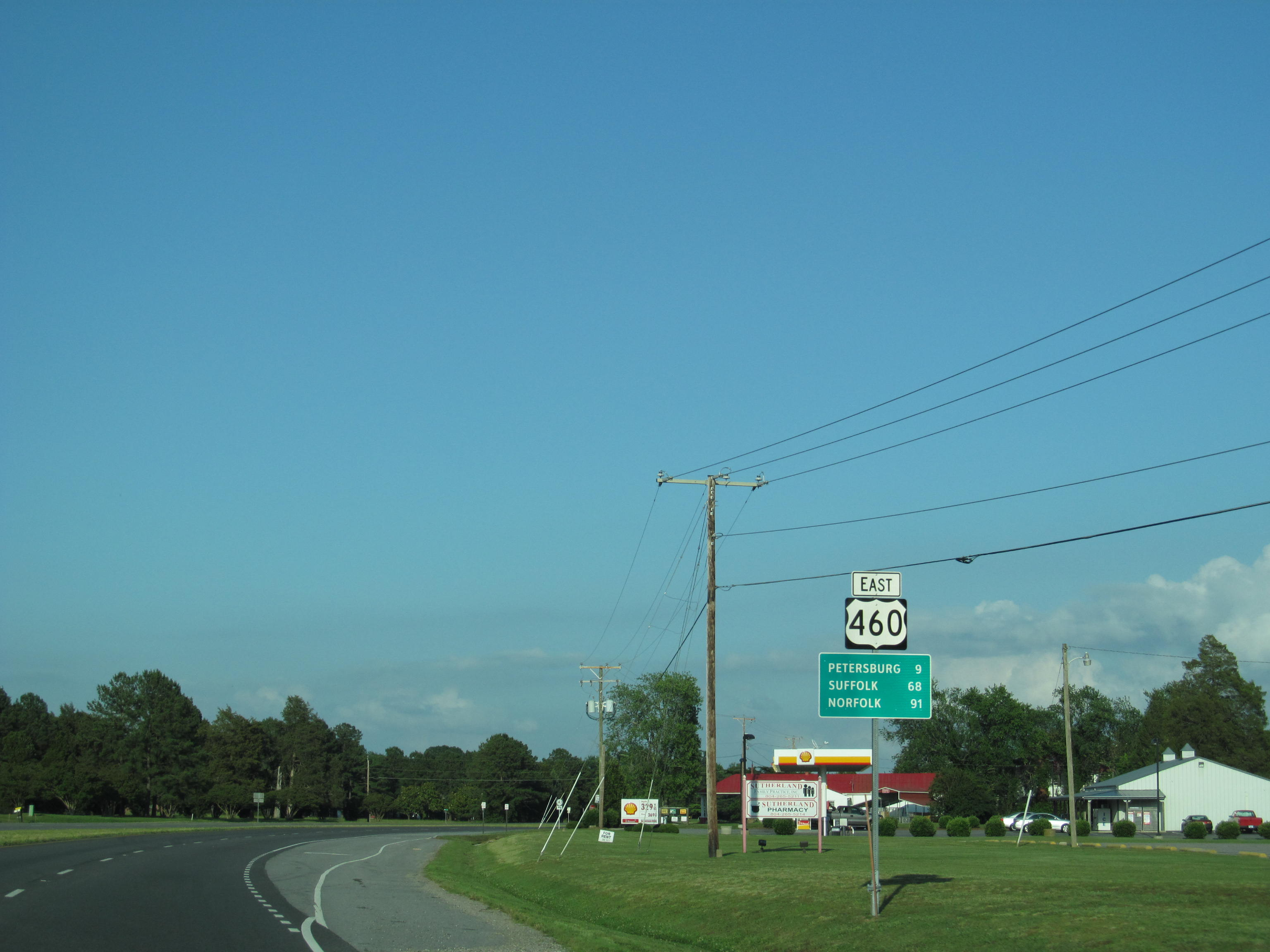
US 460 eastbound in Sutherland

US 460 heads east along Cox Road and meets the southern end of SR 153 (Rocky Hill Road) at Wellville before entering Dinwiddie County. The U.S. Highway passes through the hamlets of Wilsons, Hebron (where it crosses to the south side of the railroad), Ford, Walkers, Church Road, and Sutherland as it approaches Petersburg. US 460 veers away from the railroad at its junction with SR 226, on which the Cox Road name continues while the U.S. Highway continues on Airport Street. US 460 passes Dinwiddie County Airport shortly before its partial cloverleaf interchange with I-85 where the highway joins the Interstate. US 460 Bus. continues along Airport Street to US 1 (Boydton Plank Road), which it joins to head toward downtown Petersburg.

=== Petersburg to Suffolk ===
In the Petersburg area, US 460 leaves the Piedmont and enters the Atlantic coastal plain. I-85 and US 460 cross over Norfolk Southern's Norfolk District rail line and meet US 1 and US 460 Bus. (Boydton Plank Road) again at a partial cloverleaf interchange before entering the independent city of Petersburg. The highways have a diamond interchange with Squirrel Level Road then cross over CSX's North End Subdivision and pass under US 301 Alt. (Sycamore Street) as they approach I-95. I-85 reaches its northern terminus at a trumpet interchange with I-95 (Richmond Petersburg Turnpike) that features ramps with adjacent interchanges serving downtown Petersburg to the north and the southeastern part of the city to the south. The ramp from northbound I-85 to southbound I-95 joins that direction's collector-distributor lanes for interchanges with US 301 (Crater Road) and US 460 Bus. Eastbound US 460 Bus. briefly runs concurrently with eastbound US 460 along the collector-distributor lanes from the ramp from southbound US 301 to the ramp where US 460 Bus. exits; westbound US 460 Bus. does not join any part of I-95, and there is no access from westbound US 460 Bus. to southbound I-95 and eastbound US 460.

South of the collector-distributor roads, I-95 and US 460 cross over the Norfolk District rail line and Blackwater Swamp, the headwaters of the Blackwater River, before the highways split at a cloverleaf interchange with Wagner Road. US 460 follows four-lane divided Wagner Road across the Norfolk District rail line to a four-legged intersection with US 460 Bus. (County Drive) and SR 106 (Courthouse Road). US 460 heads southeast along four-lane divided County Drive and enters Prince George County at its cloverleaf interchange with I-295. The U.S. Highway becomes undivided and parallels the rail line through New Bohemia and Disputanta on either side of its intersection with SR 156 (Prince George Drive).

US 460 enters Sussex County along General Mahone Highway, which is named for William Mahone, the builder of the Norfolk and Petersburg Railroad whose course US 460 parallels southeast of Petersburg. Mahone and his wife, Otelia Butler Mahone, were responsible for naming the stations along the railroad, including Disputanta; these stations eventually became the towns and villages along US 460. The U.S. Highway intersects SR 40 (Main Street) in the town of Waverly and meets the southern end of SR 31 (Main Street) in the town of Wakefield. A well-known local landmark, the Virginia Diner, is in Wakefield, the so-called "Peanut Capital of the World", and near the site of the first commercial peanut crop grown in the New World. US 460 clips the southern corner of Surry County on its way between Sussex and Southampton counties. The route passes through the town of Ivor and crosses the Blackwater River into the town of Zuni in Isle of Wight County, where the route follows Windsor Highway. US 460 intersects US 258 (Prince Boulevard) in the town of Windsor.

East of Windsor, US 460 veers away from the Norfolk Southern rail line and enters the independent city of Suffolk as Pruden Boulevard. Northwest of downtown Suffolk, US 460 joins US 13 and US 58 on the Suffolk Bypass at a partial cloverleaf interchange; US 460 Bus. continues toward downtown along Pruden Boulevard. The three U.S. Highways have a partial cloverleaf interchange with SR 10 and SR 32 (Godwin Boulevard), cross the Nansemond River, and have a diamond interchange with SR 642 (Wilroy Road). The bypass veers southeast and crosses the Commonwealth Railway line to Portsmouth and SR 337 (Nansemond Parkway) without access. US 460, US 13, and US 58 curve back east and receive their respective business routes (Portsmouth Boulevard) at a partial interchange that includes a loop ramp from the westbound business routes to the eastbound mainline highways.

=== Chesapeake ===
US 460, US 13, and US 58 head east from Suffolk along six-lane divided Military Highway parallel to CSX's Portsmouth Subdivision rail line across the northern fringe of the Great Dismal Swamp. The U.S. Highways enter the city of Chesapeake and pass Hampton Roads Executive Airport before approaching the Bowers Hill area, a major highway junction. The U.S. Highways have an intersection with the west end of West Military Highway, then have a partial cloverleaf interchange with I-664 (Hampton Roads Beltway) that includes a flyover ramp from northbound I-664 to the U.S. Highways toward Suffolk. The ramp from the eastbound U.S. Highways to southbound I-664, which leads to the concurrent termini of I-664, I-64, and I-264, includes a right-in/right-out interchange with West Military Highway. East of I-664, the U.S. Highways reach an intersection with SR 191 (Joliff Road) and Airline Boulevard, onto which US 58 and US 460 Alt. continue straight while US 460 and US 13 turn south onto South Military Highway. The two U.S. Highways pass under I-664, then turn east to remain on South Military Highway at its intersection with West Military Highway; South Military Highway immediately has an at-grade crossing of the Portsmouth Subdivision rail line.

US 460 and US 13 head east along four-lane divided Military Highway, which receives a ramp from southbound I-664. The highways curve southeast and cross over an old railroad grade, then veer back east and meet I-64 (Hampton Roads Beltway) at a diamond interchange. US 460 and US 13 intersect US 17 (George Washington Highway) and the eastern end of SR 196 (Canal Drive) before they parallel Norfolk Southern's Norfolk District rail line across the Southern Branch Elizabeth River on the Gilmerton Bridge, a vertical-lift bridge. The U.S. Highways have an at-grade crossing of the Norfolk and Portsmouth Belt Line Railroad ahead of their split at a partial cloverleaf interchange; the fourth leg of the interchange is SR 166 (Bainbridge Boulevard) from the south. The interchange includes a flyover ramp for eastbound US 460 toward Bainbridge Boulevard while US 13 continues east on Military Highway on a bridge across the flyover and the Norfolk District rail line.

US 460 and SR 166 follow a two-lane road with center turn lane under I-464 (Martin Luther King Jr. Memorial Highway) and across Milldam Creek. North of Freeman Street, which provides access to I-464, the roadway becomes four lanes undivided. US 460 and SR 166 cross over another Norfolk Southern rail line and enter the South Norfolk area of Chesapeake. Within that neighborhood, Bainbridge Boulevard intersects Poindexter Street. SR 337, which provides access to I-464 and to Portsmouth via the Jordan Bridge, enters the intersection from Poindexter Street to the west and turns onto Bainbridge Boulevard; US 460 and SR 166 turn east onto two-lane Poindexter Street. At Liberty Street, which heads east as SR 246, the highways turn west onto Liberty Street then turn northeast again onto 22nd Street and cross over the Norfolk District rail line. US 460 and SR 166 veer from 22nd onto two-lane Wilson Road at the boundary between the cities of Chesapeake and Norfolk.

=== Norfolk ===
US 460 and SR 166 follow Wilson Road north through where it expands to a four-lane divided highway just south of its intersection with Indian River Road, which is SR 407 to the east. Next, the highways have an acute intersection with SR 168 (Campostella Road). The three highways head north on six-lane divided Campostella Road and cross the Eastern Branch Elizabeth River on the Campostella Bridge. US 460, SR 166, and SR 168 have a partial interchange with I-264; there is no access from the surface highway to the westbound Interstate or from eastbound I-264 to eastbound US 460. Immediately to the north of the interchange, the highways pass under Hampton Roads Transit's Tide Light Rail and its elevated NSU station at the southwest corner of the Norfolk State University campus. The three highways head west on Brambleton Avenue; SR 166 splits north from US 460 and SR 168 at Park Avenue. US 460 and SR 168 pass under the Norfolk District rail line and intersect Tidewater Drive, onto which SR 168 turns north and from which SR 337 joins US 460 from the south. US 460 and SR 337 follow Brambleton Avenue west together to Church Street, onto which US 460 turns north while SR 337 continues west on Brambleton Avenue with the easternmost portion of US 460 Alt.

US 460 follows four-lane divided Church Street through an intersection with US 58 (Virginia Beach Boulevard), an underpass of the Norfolk District rail line, and intersections with SR 247, which follow the one-way pair of 26th Street and 27th Street. The U.S. Highway has an oblique intersection with Granby Street, the name the highway keeps to its eastern terminus, south of the Virginia Zoological Park. US 460 becomes a four-lane road with center turn lane as it passes the zoo, then becomes divided again just before it crosses the Lafayette River. The highway intersects SR 165 (Little Creek Road) and meets I-64 (Hampton Roads Beltway) and I-564 (Admiral Taussig Boulevard), which serves Naval Station Norfolk, at the junction of the Interstates just north of the U.S. Highway's at-grade crossing of the secondary Norfolk Southern rail line. US 460 receives a ramp from I-564, eastbound US 460 has a ramp to I-564, and westbound US 460 receives a ramp from eastbound I-64. Access from US 460 to eastbound I-64 and from westbound I-64 to US 460 is made via SR 165. North of the I-64–I-564 junction, US 460 parallels I-64 along the eastern edge of Naval Station Norfolk; there are ramps from US 460 to both directions of I-64 during the parallel stretch. North of Masons Creek, US 460 veers away from I-64. The U.S. Highway has a partial interchange with SR 168 (Tidewater Drive); there is no access from northbound SR 168 to westbound US 460 or from southbound SR 168 to westbound US 460. Westbound US 460 runs concurrently with US 60 Alt. from SR 168 to US 460's eastern terminus at US 60 (Ocean View Avenue) in the Ocean View neighborhood on the Chesapeake Bay.

=== River crossings ===
In South Hampton Roads, US 460 crosses the Elizabeth River twice on its way to its eastern terminus. In western Chesapeake, it shares the four-lane Gilmerton Bridge with US 13 to cross the Southern Branch of the river. After crossing through the city, it then shares the Campostella Bridge with SR 168 to cross the Eastern Branch in the city of Norfolk.

== History ==
Most of present US 460 or its former alignments was part of the initial Virginia highway system, defined in 1918. Specifically, the following pieces existed:

- Claypool Hill to West Virginia (U.S. Route 19 concurrency): VA 11
- West Virginia to Christiansburg: VA 23
- Christiansburg to Petersburg (including the U.S. Route 11 concurrency): VA 10
- Suffolk to Norfolk (U.S. Route 58 concurrency): VA 10

=== Kentucky to West Virginia ===
In late 1921, the Virginia State Highway Commission recommended that the General Assembly add the road from State Route 11 (now U.S. Route 19) at Claypool Hill northwest to Grundy to the state highway system as a spur of SR 11 to provide "an easterly outlet from Buchanan County". This spur was assigned the designation State Route 11X by 1923, and later that year it became State Route 111. It was renumbered State Route 126 in the 1928 renumbering and State Route 84 in the 1933 renumbering. A 6.38-mile (10.27 km) extension from Grundy northwest towards Kentucky was added in 1932, and the rest to the state line was added in 1936. In the 1940 renumbering, SR 84 was renumbered State Route 4 to match Kentucky Route 4.

=== West Virginia to Norfolk ===
Part of the track of the highway was once known as the Trader's Path, a colonial trail dating from the 17th century that led from Augusta County, Virginia to Roanoke, Virginia. In the early 1970s, the former Virginian Railway right-of-way along the north bank of the New River eastward from a point near the Virginia-West Virginia border, near Glen Lyn to Narrows (both in Virginia) was acquired by VDOT's predecessor agency from the Norfolk and Western Railway to enable four-laning of the highway through the narrow space between the river and rocky bluffs. (The N&W main line follows the south bank through this area). This portion of the highway has experienced long closures due to massive landslides.

From Lynchburg east to Suffolk, the highway was built closely following the main line of the Norfolk and Western Railway (now Norfolk Southern), in many places.

== Future ==
Corridor Q, the future US 460, is currently signed as SR 460. Beginning in Buchanan County at the Kentucky state line, it is a continuation of Kentucky Route 3174. Just after entering Virginia, the road crosses the Grassy Creek Bridge. Soon there is an intersection with SR 80. Next the route transitions to an undivided roadway, some two lane, but mostly with a third lane for climbing, for around 4.4 miles (7.1 km). Reaching SR 609 (Bull Creek Road), the roadway transitions to four-lane undivided. The almost 3-mile (4.8 km) section between Southern Gap Road (SR 744) and the route's current end at SR 604 (Poplar Creek Road) cost an estimated $199 million. By late 2027, the route is planned to be extended another 2 miles (3.2 km) to Grundy, at a cost of $178 million, where it will meet the existing US 460.

== Major intersections ==
Exit numbers reset for every town.

State	County	Location	mi	km	Exit	Destinations	Notes
Virginia	Buchanan	Big Rock	0.00	0.00		US 460 west – Pikeville, Frankfort	Kentucky state line
Virginia	Buchanan					US 121 west (Coalfields Expressway)	Proposed interchange at new alignment of US 460; west end of US 121 concurrency
Virginia	Buchanan					US 121 east (Coalfields Expressway)	Proposed east end of US 121 concurrency
Virginia	Buchanan	Grundy	12.83	20.65		SR 83 east (Edgewater Drive) – Grundy, West Virginia line	West end of concurrency with SR 83
Virginia	Buchanan	Vansant	16.78	27.00		SR 83 west – Breaks Interstate Park, Pound, Grundy Municipal Airport	East end of concurrency with SR 83
Virginia	Tazewell	Raven	40.18	64.66		SR 67 south – Raven, Honaker	West end of concurrency with SR 67
Virginia	Tazewell	Richlands	41.56	66.88		US 460 Bus. east / SR 67 north (Front Street) – Richlands	East end of concurrency with SR 67
Virginia	Tazewell	Richlands	42.88	69.01	2	SR 67 – Richlands, Jewell Ridge	Partial cloverleaf interchange
Virginia	Tazewell	Cedar Bluff	44.57	71.73	1	US 460 Bus. – Richlands, Cedar Bluff	Right-in/right-out interchange
Virginia	Tazewell	Cedar Bluff	45.75	73.63		US 460 Bus. west (Cedar Valley Drive) – Cedar Bluff	
Virginia	Tazewell	Claypool Hill	47.00	75.64		US 19 south – Lebanon, Bristol	West end of concurrency with US 19
Virginia	Tazewell	Pisgah	57.86	93.12		US 19 Bus. north / US 460 Bus. east (Crab Orchard Road) – Frog Level	
Virginia	Tazewell	Tazewell	59.58	95.88	1	SR 16 Alt. (Fairground Road) – Tazewell	Partial cloverleaf interchange
Virginia	Tazewell	Tazewell	61.01	98.19	2	SR 16 (Tazewell Avenue) – Tazewell	Diamond interchange
Virginia	Tazewell	Tazewell	61.83	99.51	3	SR 61 (Riverside Drive) – Tazewell, Rocky Gap	Partial cloverleaf interchange
Virginia	Tazewell	Tazewell			4	SR 678	Partial cloverleaf interchange; eastbound exit and westbound entrance
Virginia	Tazewell	Tazewell			4	SR 645	Partial cloverleaf interchange; westbound exit and eastbound entrance
Virginia	Tazewell		63.76	102.61	5	US 19 Bus. south / US 460 Bus. west	Partial interchange; westbound exit and eastbound entrance
Virginia	Tazewell	Bluefield	74.47	119.85	1	US 19 north – Bluefield, West Graham	Trumpet interchange; east end of concurrency with US 19
Virginia	Tazewell	Bluefield	76.38	122.92	2	SR 720 (Hockman Pike) – Bluefield VA	Partial cloverleaf interchange
Virginia	Tazewell	Bluefield	78.24	125.92	3	SR 102 – Pocahontas	Partial cloverleaf interchange; access via SR 720
Virginia–West Virginia line		Bluefield	79.59 0.00	128.09 0.00			
West Virginia	Mercer	Bluefield	1.0	1.6		WV 598 south	West end of WV 598 concurrency
West Virginia	Mercer	Bluefield				WV 598 north (Cherry Road) to US 52 north / Washington Street – Downtown, Welch	East end of WV 598 concurrency
West Virginia	Mercer	Bluefield				US 52 north	West end of US 52 concurrency
West Virginia	Mercer	Bluefield				US 52 Truck begin / US 52 south to I-77 – Wytheville VA	East end of US 52 concurrency; west end of unsigned US 52 Truck concurrency
West Virginia	Mercer					US 19 south / US 52 Truck – Bluefield	East end of US 52 Truck concurrency; west end of US 19 concurrency
West Virginia	Mercer	Green Valley				WV 123 west – Mercer County Airport	
West Virginia	Mercer		10.5	16.9		US 19 north (Courthouse Road) – Princeton	East end of US 19 concurrency; serves Princeton Community Hospital
West Virginia	Mercer		15.0	24.1		WV 104 west to WV 20 – Pipestem Resort State Park	
West Virginia	Mercer					I-77 – Wytheville VA, Beckley	I-77 exit 9
West Virginia	Mercer		21.5	34.6		WV 112 west (Ingleside Road) – Oakvale, Kellysville	
West Virginia–Virginia line			26.8 0.00	43.1 0.00			
Virginia	Giles	Rich Creek	3.29	5.29		US 219 north (Island Street) – Lewisburg WV	
Virginia	Giles	Narrows	6.97	11.22		SR 61 west (Fleshman Street) – Narrows	
Virginia	Giles	Pearisburg				US 460 Bus. east (Main Street) to SR 100 south – Pearisburg	Trumpet interchange
Virginia	Giles	Ripplemead				US 460 Bus. west / SR 636 – Ripplemead, Pearisburg	Diamond interchange
Virginia	Giles	Newport	26.72	43.00		SR 42 east (Blue Grass Trail) – New Castle	
Virginia	Montgomery	Blacksburg	31.74	51.08		US 460 Bus. east (Main Street) – Blacksburg	
Virginia	Montgomery	Blacksburg				SR 650 (Toms Creek Road)	Partial cloverleaf interchange
Virginia	Montgomery	Blacksburg	35.04	56.39		SR 412 (Prices Fork Road) – Downtown Blacksburg	Partial cloverleaf interchange
Virginia	Montgomery	Blacksburg				SR 314 east (Southgate Drive)	Partial diverging diamond interchange
Virginia	Montgomery	Blacksburg	38.01	61.17	5AB	US 460 Bus. / Virginia Smart Road – Blacksburg	Complex interchange; signed as exits 5A (east) and 5B (west); serves LewisGale Hospital Montgomery
Virginia	Montgomery	Christiansburg	40.49	65.16	4AB	SR 114 west (Peppers Ferry Road) – Radford	Partial cloverleaf interchange; signed as exit 4B westbound
Virginia	Montgomery	Christiansburg	41.44	66.69	3AB	US 460 Bus. (Franklin Street) – Christiansburg	Complex interchange; no access from eastbound US 460 to westbound US 460 Bus. or from eastbound US 460 Bus. to westbound US 460; signed as exits 3A (east) and 3B (west) westbound; no exit number eastbound
Virginia	Montgomery	Christiansburg	43.97	70.76	2	US 11 (Roanoke Street) / US 460 Bus. – Christiansburg	Diamond interchange with direct ramps between US 11/US 460 Bus. and southbound I-81; no exit number westbound
Virginia	Montgomery	Christiansburg	44.33	71.34	1B	I-81 south to I-77 – Radford, Bristol	I-81 exit 118B
Virginia	Montgomery	Christiansburg	44.33	71.34	1A	Parkway Drive	No westbound exit; left entrance westbound, left exit
Virginia	Montgomery	Christiansburg	45.63	73.43		I-81 north / US 11 south / US 460 Bus. west – Salem, Roanoke, Christiansburg, Blacksburg	I-81 exit 118C; eastbound US 460 follows exit 118C from northbound I-81 collector-distributor lanes; westbound US 460 joins southbound I-81 collector-distributor lanes; west end of concurrency with US 11
Virginia	Roanoke	No major junctions					
Virginia	City of Salem		65.41	105.27		SR 112 west (Wildwood Road) to I-81	
Virginia	City of Salem		66.72	107.38		US 11 Alt. north / US 460 Alt. east (4th Street)	
Virginia	City of Salem		67.67	108.90		US 11 north (College Avenue)	East end of concurrency with US 11
Virginia	City of Salem		67.78	109.08		SR 311 (Thompson Memorial Drive)	
Virginia	City of Salem		69.24	111.43		US 11 Alt. south / US 460 Alt. west / SR 419 (Electric Road) to I-81 / US 221	West end of concurrency with US 11 Alt.
Virginia	City of Roanoke		70.33	113.19		SR 117 (Peters Creek Road)	
Virginia	City of Roanoke		72.08	116.00		SR 116 north (Lafayette Boulevard)	West end of concurrency with SR 116
Virginia	City of Roanoke		74.39	119.72		Future I-73 / I-581 / US 220 to I-81 – Downtown Roanoke	West end of concurrency with US 220 Alt.; exits 4E-W on I-581
Virginia	City of Roanoke		74.63	120.11		US 11 / US 221 south / SR 116 south (Williamson Road) – Civic Center, Downtown Roanoke	Eastern terminus of US 11 Alt.; east end of concurrency with SR 116; west end of concurrency with US 221
Virginia	City of Roanoke		75.12	120.89		SR 115 north (Hollins Road)	
Virginia	Roanoke	Bonsack	79.44	127.85		US 220 Alt. north (Cloverdale Road) to I-81 / US 11 – Troutville	East end of concurrency with US 220 Alt.
Virginia	Botetourt	Blue Ridge	82.33	132.50		Blue Ridge Parkway	Partial cloverleaf interchange
Virginia	Bedford	Bedford	100.56	161.84		US 460 Bus. east (Blue Ridge Avenue) – Bedford	Partial interchange; no eastbound entrance
Virginia	Bedford	Bedford	101.94	164.06		SR 122 south / SR 122 Bus. north (Burks Hill Road) – Bedford	Diamond interchange; west end of concurrency with SR 122
Virginia	Bedford	Bedford	103.38	166.37		US 221 north / SR 122 north / US 460 Bus. west (Main Street) – Bedford, Big Island	Diamond interchange; east end of concurrencies with US 221 and SR 122
Virginia	Campbell	Timberlake	117.31	188.79	—	US 460 Bus. east (Timberlake Road) – Lynchburg	West end of freeway
Virginia	Campbell	Timberlake			—	SR 682 (Leesville Road)	
Virginia	Campbell	Timberlake	121.22	195.08	—	SR 678 (Airport Road) to Greenview Drive	
Virginia	Campbell		122.58	197.27	—	US 29 south / US 29 Bus. north (Wards Road) – Lynchburg, Danville	Cloverleaf interchange; west end of concurrency with US 29
Virginia	City of Lynchburg					University Boulevard	Westbound entrance only
Virginia	City of Lynchburg		123.99	199.54	—	Candlers Mountain Road to SR 670 / University Boulevard – Liberty University	University Blvd. not signed eastbound; SR 670 not signed westbound
Virginia	City of Lynchburg		124.48	200.33	—	US 501 north / Candlers Mountain Road – Buena Vista	Directional T interchange; left exit northbound; west end of concurrency with US 501
Virginia	City of Lynchburg				—	Odd Fellows Road	
Virginia	City of Lynchburg		126.39	203.40	—	US 501 south / US 460 Bus. west / US 501 Bus. north (Campbell Avenue) – South Boston	Partial cloverleaf interchange; east end of concurrency with US 501; east end of freeway
Virginia	City of Lynchburg		128.53	206.85		US 29 north – Amherst, Charlottesville	Trumpet interchange; east end of concurrency with US 29
Virginia	Campbell	Kelly	130.42	209.89		SR 726 (Mt. Athos Road)	Trumpet interchange
Virginia	Campbell	Concord	135.93	218.76		SR 24 west (Village Highway) – Rustburg	West end of concurrency with SR 24
Virginia	Appomattox	Appomattox	143.83	231.47		US 460 Bus. east / SR 26 north – Appomattox, Bent Creek	Diamond interchange
Virginia	Appomattox	Appomattox	144.55	232.63		SR 24 east / SR 131 south to US 60 – Appomattox	Diamond interchange; east end of concurrency with SR 24
Virginia	Appomattox	Appomattox	146.42	235.64		US 460 Bus. west – Appomattox	Partial interchange; no access from US 460 Bus. to westbound US 460
Virginia	Appomattox	Pamplin City	155.11	249.63		US 460 Bus. east (Pamplin Road) to SR 47 – Pamplin	
Virginia	Prince Edward	Shields	157.17	252.94		US 460 Bus. west (Pamplin Road) to SR 47 – Pamplin City	
Virginia	Prince Edward		168.73	271.54		US 15 north / US 460 Bus. east (Sheppards Road) – Farmville, Culpeper	Trumpet interchange; west end of concurrency with US 15
Virginia	Prince Edward	Farmville	172.91	278.27		US 15 south / US 15 Bus. north (Farmville Road) – Farmville, Keysville	Diamond interchange; east end of concurrency with US 15
Virginia	Prince Edward	Farmville	175.89	283.07		US 460 Bus. west (Third Street) – Farmville	Partial interchange; westbound exit and eastbound entrance
Virginia	Prince Edward	Rice	180.17	289.96		SR 307 east (Holly Farms Road) – Richmond	
Virginia	Nottoway	Burkeville	187.66	302.01		US 360 west (Patrick Henry Highway) / US 360 Bus. / US 460 Bus. east (Second Street) – South Boston, Danville, Burkeville	Partial trumpet interchange; no access from eastbound US 460 to westbound US 360 or from westbound US 360 / US 460 to eastbound US 360 Bus. / US 460 Bus.; west end of concurrency with US 360
Virginia	Nottoway	Burkeville	188.91	304.02		US 360 Bus. / US 460 Bus. west (Second Street) – Burkeville	
Virginia	Nottoway		189.34	304.71		US 360 east (Patrick Henry Highway) – Richmond	Partial interchange; eastbound exit and westbound entrance; east end of concurrency with US 360
Virginia	Nottoway		189.53	305.02		SR 723 (Lewiston Plank Road) to US 360 east – Richmond	
Virginia	Nottoway	Crewe	191.58	308.32		SR 49 north (Watsons Wood Road)	West end of concurrency with SR 49
Virginia	Nottoway	Crewe	193.38	311.21		SR 49 south (The Falls Road) – Victoria, Chase City, Clarksville	East end of concurrency with SR 49
Virginia	Nottoway	Nottoway	196.78	316.69		US 460 Bus. east (Old Nottoway Road) – Nottoway, Blackstone	Partial cloverleaf interchange
Virginia	Nottoway	Blackstone	202.08	325.22		SR 606 (Cottage Road) – Blackstone	Diamond interchange
Virginia	Nottoway		204.31	328.81		US 460 Bus. west (Cox Road) – Blackstone, Fort Barfoot, Kenbridge	
Virginia	Nottoway	Wellville				SR 153 north (Rocky Hill Road) – Amelia	
Virginia	Dinwiddie		230.94	371.66		SR 226 east (Cox Road)	
Virginia	Dinwiddie		232.15	373.61		I-85 south / US 460 Bus. east (Airport Street) to US 1 – South Hill	I-85 exit 61; west end of concurrency with I-85
Virginia	Dinwiddie		234.11	376.76	63	US 1 (Boydton Plank Road) / US 460 Bus.	Exit numbers follow I-85; signed as exits 63A (south) and 63B (north)
Virginia	City of Petersburg		236.30	380.29	65	Squirrel Level Road	
Virginia	City of Petersburg		238.97	384.58	—	I-95 north (Richmond–Petersburg Turnpike) – Richmond	I-85 exit 68; I-95 exit 51; northern terminus of I-85; east end of concurrency with I-85; west end of concurrency with I-95
Virginia	City of Petersburg		239.10– 239.55	384.79– 385.52	50	US 460 Bus. east (County Drive) to SR 109 / US 301 (Crater Road) / Wythe Street / Washington Street – Fort Gregg-Adams, Historic Old Towne Petersburg	Exit numbers follow I-95; westbound signed as "US 460 east to SR 109/US 301/Wythe St./Washington St."; eastbound signed separately as "US 301" and "US 460 Bus." only; signed as exits 50A (US 460), 50B-C (US 301), and 50D (Wythe St./Washington St.) westbound; no exit numbers eastbound
Virginia	City of Petersburg		241.27	388.29	48B	Wagner Road west	No westbound entrance; serves Southside Regional Medical Center
Virginia	City of Petersburg		241.27	388.29		I-95 south	I-95 exit 48A; east end of concurrency with I-95; westbound access via Wagner Road
Virginia	City of Petersburg		242.87	390.86		US 460 Bus. west (County Drive) / SR 106 north (Courthouse Road) – Prince George, Fort Gregg-Adams	
Virginia	Prince George	New Bohemia	243.61	392.05		I-295 – Washington, Rocky Mount NC	I-295 exit 3
Virginia	Prince George	Disputanta	247.42	398.18		SR 156 (Prince George Drive) – Hopewell	
Virginia	Sussex	Waverly	260.52	419.27		SR 40 (Main Street) – Claremont, Stony Creek	
Virginia	Sussex	Wakefield				SR 31 north (Main Street) – Surry	
Virginia	Surry	No major junctions					
Virginia	Southampton	No major junctions					
Virginia	Isle of Wight	Windsor	285.15	458.90		US 258 (Prince Boulevard) – Smithfield, Franklin	
Virginia	City of Suffolk		294.02	473.18		US 13 south / US 58 west (Suffolk Bypass) / US 460 Bus. east (Pruden Boulevard) – Emporia, Downtown Suffolk	Partial cloverleaf interchange; west end of concurrencies with US 13 and US 58
Virginia	City of Suffolk		294.95	474.68		SR 10 / SR 32 (Godwin Boulevard) – Smithfield, Newport News, Downtown Suffolk	Partial cloverleaf interchange
Virginia	City of Suffolk		296.82	477.69		SR 642 (Wilroy Road)	Partial cloverleaf interchange
Virginia	City of Suffolk		299.12	481.39		US 13 Bus. south / US 58 Bus. west / US 460 Bus. west (Portsmouth Boulevard) – Downtown Suffolk	Partial interchange; westbound exit and eastbound entrance
Virginia	City of Chesapeake		305.52	491.69		I-664 (Hampton Roads Beltway) to I-64 / I-264 – Portsmouth, Norfolk, Virginia Beach, Newport News, Hampton	I-664 exit 13
Virginia	City of Chesapeake		305.63	491.86		US 58 east / US 460 Alt. east (Airline Boulevard) / SR 191 north (Joliff Road) – Portsmouth	East end of concurrency with US 58; west end of concurrency with SR 191
Virginia	City of Chesapeake		305.81	492.15		West Military Highway	East end of concurrency with SR 191; US 13 and US 460 turn east to remain on South Military Highway
Virginia	City of Chesapeake		308.70	496.80		I-64 to I-664 – Suffolk, Virginia Beach	I-64 exit 297
Virginia	City of Chesapeake		310.07	499.01		US 17 (George Washington Highway) – Portsmouth, Elizabeth City, NC	
Virginia	City of Chesapeake		311.08	500.63		SR 196 west (Canal Drive)	
Virginia	City of Chesapeake					Gilmerton Bridge over the Southern Branch Elizabeth River	
Virginia	City of Chesapeake		313.28	504.18		US 13 north (South Military Highway) / SR 166 south (Bainbridge Boulevard) – Virginia Beach, Great Bridge	Partial cloverleaf interchange; east end of concurrency with US 13; west end of concurrency with SR 166
Virginia	City of Chesapeake		316.08	508.68		SR 337 (Poindexter Street/Bainbridge Boulevard) to I-464 – Portsmouth	US 460 and SR 166 turn from Bainbridge Boulevard onto Poindexter Street
Virginia	City of Chesapeake		316.64	509.58		SR 246 east (Liberty Street)	
Virginia	City of Norfolk		317.68	511.26		SR 168 south (Campostella Road)	West end of concurrency with SR 168
Virginia	City of Norfolk					Campostella Bridge over the Eastern Branch Elizabeth River	
Virginia	City of Norfolk		318.41	512.43		I-264 east to I-64 – Virginia Beach	I-264 exit 11; no access from US 460 to westbound I-264 or from eastbound I-264 to westbound US 460
Virginia	City of Norfolk		318.71	512.91		SR 166 north (Park Avenue)	East end of concurrency with SR 166
Virginia	City of Norfolk		319.11	513.56		SR 168 north / SR 337 west (Tidewater Drive) to I-264 / I-464	East end of concurrency with SR 168; west end of concurrency with SR 337
Virginia	City of Norfolk		319.42	514.06		SR 337 east / US 460 Alt. west (Brambleton Avenue)	East end of concurrency with SR 337
Virginia	City of Norfolk		319.66	514.44		US 58 (Virginia Beach Boulevard)	
Virginia	City of Norfolk		320.81	516.29		SR 247 east (26th Street)	One-way street
Virginia	City of Norfolk		320.88	516.41		SR 247 west (27th Street)	One-way street
Virginia	City of Norfolk		323.81	521.12		SR 165 (Little Creek Road) to I-64 east	
Virginia	City of Norfolk		324.25	521.83		I-564 west (Admiral Taussig Boulevard) – Naval Station Norfolk	I-64 exit 276; ramps from eastbound US 460 to I-564, eastbound I-64 to westbound US 460, and I-564 to US 460
Virginia	City of Norfolk		324.94	522.94		I-64 (Hampton Roads Beltway) – Virginia Beach, Hampton	No access from I-64 to US 460
Virginia	City of Norfolk		326.13	524.86		SR 168 / US 60 Alt. west (Tidewater Drive) to I-64	Partial diamond interchange; no access from northbound SR 168 to westbound US 460 or from southbound SR 168 to westbound US 460; west end of concurrency with US 60 Alt. (westbound)
Virginia	City of Norfolk		326.84	526.00		US 60 (Ocean View Avenue) / US 60 Alt. end	Eastern terminus; east end of concurrency with US 60 Alt. (westbound)
1.000 mi = 1.609 km; 1.000 km = 0.621 mi: Concurrency terminus; Incomplete access; Unopened

== See also ==
Special routes of U.S. Route 460

Preceded by Kentucky	U.S. Route 460; Virginia	Succeeded by West Virginia
Preceded by West Virginia	U.S. Route 460; Virginia	Succeeded by terminus

< SR 51	Two‑digit State Routes; 1923-1933	SR 53 >
none	Spurs of SR 11; 1923–1928	SR 112 >
< SR 125	District 1 State Routes; 1928–1933	SR 127 >
