= U.S. Route 460 =

Highway in the United States

U.S. Route 460
- US 460 highlighted in red

Route information
- Auxiliary route of US 60
- Length: 655 mi (1,054 km)
- Existed: 1933–present

Major junctions
- West end: US 60 / US 421 in Frankfort, KY
- I-75 in Georgetown, KY; I-64 in Mount Sterling, KY; I-77 near Princeton, WV; I-81 in Christiansburg, VA; I-581 / US 220 in Roanoke, VA; I-85 in Petersburg, VA; I-95 in Petersburg, VA; I-295 in Petersburg, VA
- East end: US 60 in Norfolk, VA

Location
- Country: United States
- States: Kentucky, West Virginia, Virginia

Highway system
- United States Numbered Highway System; List; Special; Divided
← US 340	WV	→ I-470

U.S. Route 460 (US 460) is an auxiliary route of U.S. Route 60. It currently runs for 655 miles (1,054 km) from Norfolk, Virginia, at its parent route US 60 at Ocean View to Frankfort, Kentucky, intersecting its parent route once again. It passes through the states of Virginia, West Virginia, and Kentucky. The section from Interstate 81 (I-81) at Christiansburg, Virginia, to US 23 in Pikeville, Kentucky, is Corridor Q in the Appalachian Development Highway System. The portion improved under this system is unfinished between Grundy, Virginia, and Pikeville.

US 460 is a major east–west highway in Virginia. It is a major thoroughfare through southern Hampton Roads and connects the area to Petersburg. US 460 connects Lynchburg to Roanoke. US 460 is paired with US 221 between Bedford and Roanoke and with I-81 between Salem and Christiansburg. It is also the primary east–west roadway in the northern part of Southwest Virginia between Christiansburg and the Kentucky border; several miles near Bluefield pass through West Virginia.

== Route description ==
=== Kentucky ===
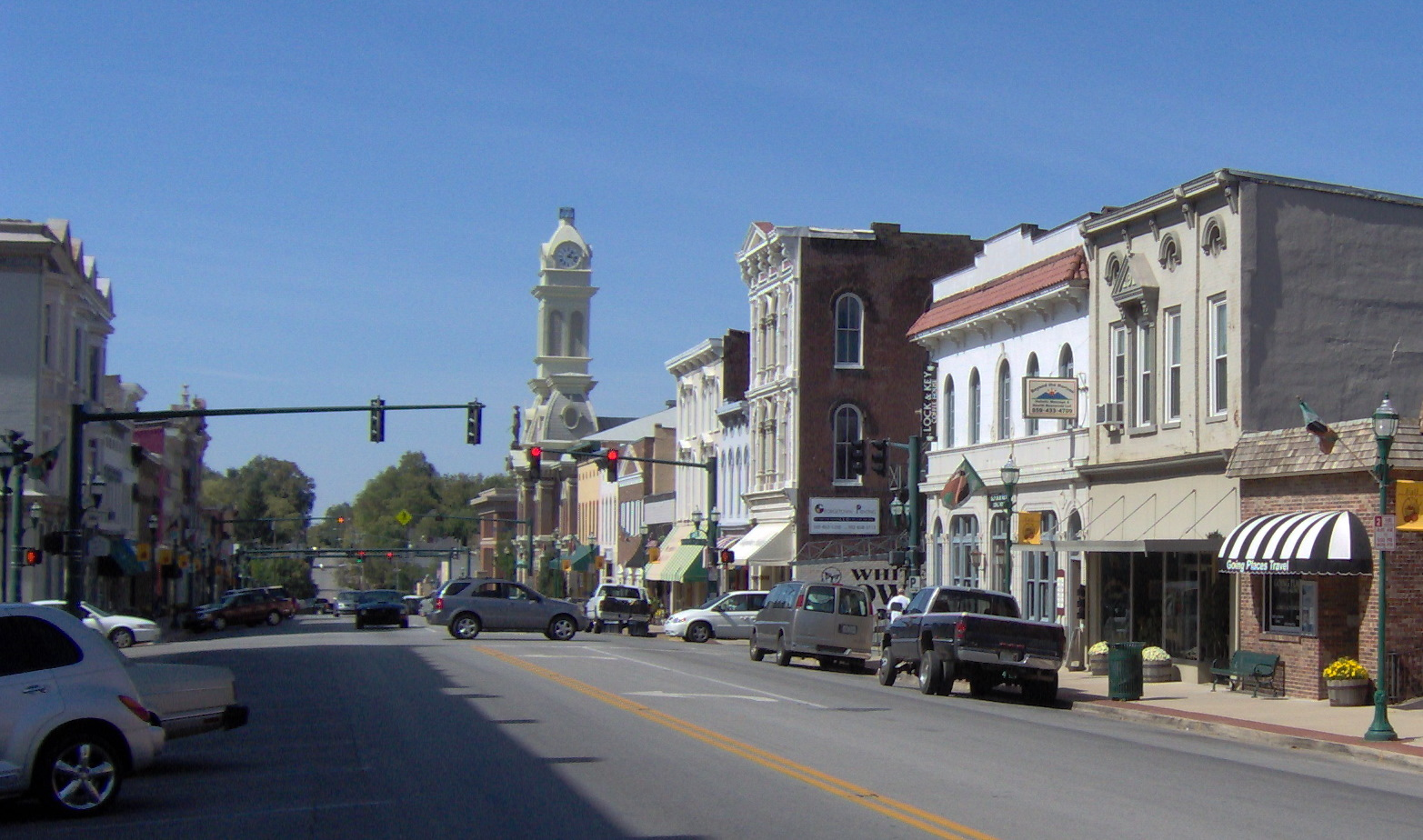
U. S. Route 460 runs through downtown Georgetown, Kentucky.

US 460 now begins when it splits from US 60/US 421 a few miles east of downtown Frankfort. It is a winding two-lane highway with no shoulders and intersects US 62 and I-75 at Georgetown. It proceeds to Paris, where it serves as the town's "Main Street" and intersects US 27 and US 68. The next major intersection is with I-64 in Mount Sterling. It proceeds through Frenchburg and West Liberty. In Salyersville, the Mountain Parkway ends by merging onto it. It is a 3-lane highway for 14 miles and then it merges with US 23 in Paintsville. US 460 East follows US-23 South through Prestonsburg and Pikeville. The route enters the southwestern part of Virginia.

=== Virginia and West Virginia ===
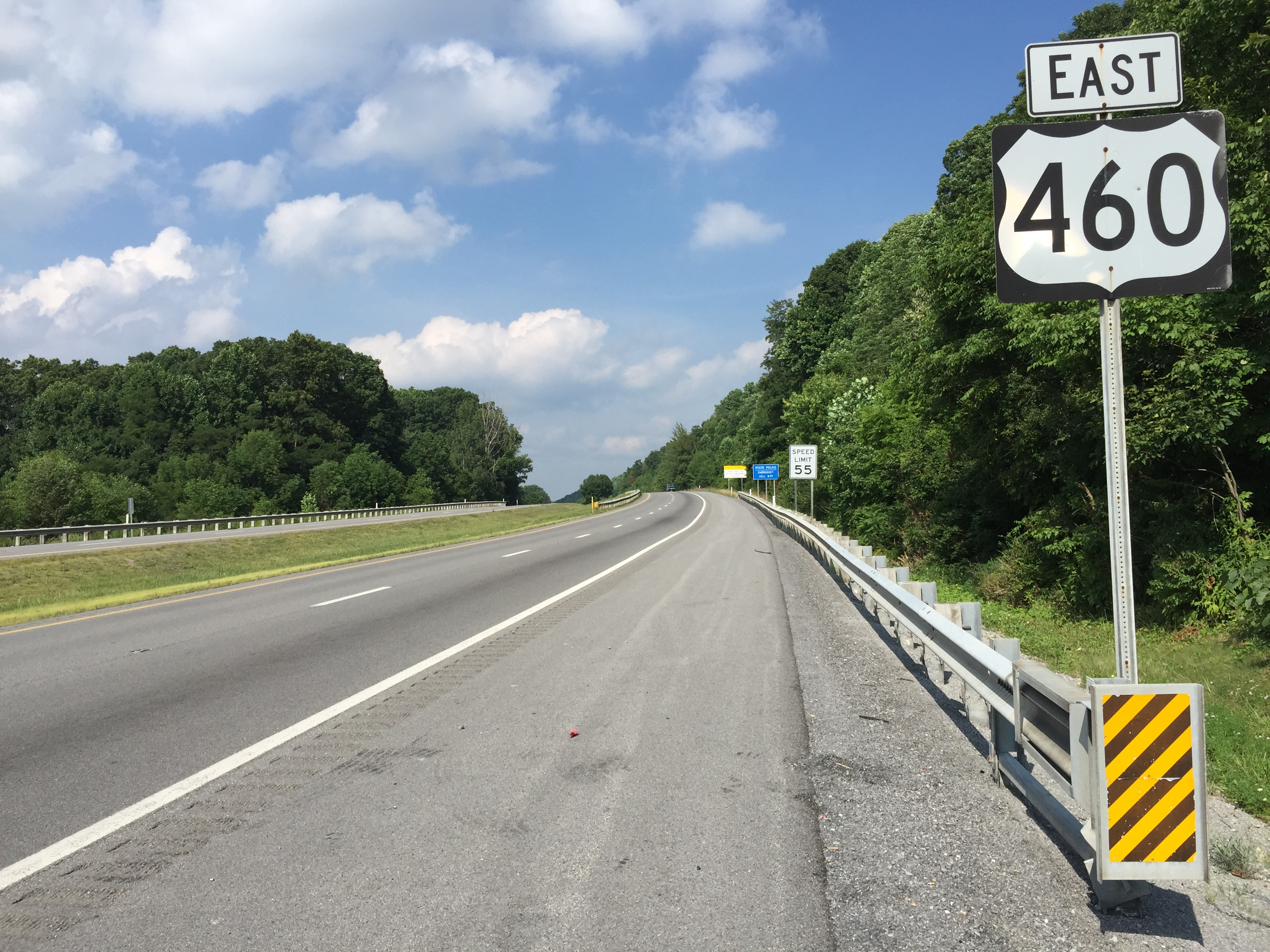
US 460 eastbound at WV 598 in Bluefield, West Virginia

U.S. Route 460 runs east–west through the southern part of Virginia. It has two separate pieces in Virginia, joined by a relatively short section in West Virginia. Most of US 460 is a four-lane divided highway.

US 460 from Interstate 81 at Christiansburg west to Pikeville, Kentucky, including the piece in West Virginia, is Corridor Q of the Appalachian Development Highway System. From West Virginia east to I-81, US 460 is also part of the proposed Interstate 73.

== History ==
The earliest origins of this road were as part of the track once known as the Trader's Path, a Virginia colonial trail dating from the 17th century that led from Augusta County to present-day Roanoke. Before it was commissioned as a federally designated route in the late 1940s, US 460 was designated as Kentucky Route 4 from the western Virginia state line near Grundy to Millard, Kentucky. It was Kentucky Route 40 from Paintsville to Lexington.

In the pre-Interstate era, US 460 was a major highway, passing from Frankfort through Louisville, Kentucky and Evansville, Indiana, and ending in St. Louis, Missouri, after crossing the MacArthur Bridge.

Interstate 64 has supplanted most of old US 460 as a more direct route. The stretch through Indiana and Illinois was eliminated in November 1976. Old US 460 has been redesignated in these areas as parts of State Road 66 and State Road 62 in Indiana; and part of Illinois Route 15, Illinois Route 142, and Illinois Route 14 in that state. However, its parent route, US 60 has not been supplanted by I-64 and converted to a state highway in the greater Louisville area.

Many years after the road's elimination in Indiana in 1977, some older residents and even businesses along what is now Indiana State Road 62 still refer to the road as "Highway 460." Older billboards retain that designation in the St. Meinrad area. Some current telephone books also contain listings for those living on "Hwy 460."

When Fishtrap Lake was created in Pike County, Kentucky, US 460 was realigned to its current route from Salyersville to Paintsville. The former US 460 leading to the lake is now Kentucky Routes 1499 and 1789. The part between Paintsville and Millard remained U.S. Route 23 and Kentucky Route 80.

== Future ==
Kentucky Route 3174
- Location: Pikeville–Elkhorn City
- Length: 16.2 mi (26.1 km)
- Existed: 2014–present

Future Corridor Q (currently signed as Kentucky Route 3174) is being constructed south of the current alignment of US 460 as a four-lane divided highway from Pikeville to Grundy. The current alignment is a rural two-lane road winding along the rivers and mountains of Virginia and Kentucky. After the segment is completed, US 460 is to be realigned onto that segment and be concurrent with future US 121 (Coalfields Expressway) in Virginia.

== Major intersections ==
Kentucky
US 60 / US 421 in Frankfort
US 25 in Georgetown
US 62 in Georgetown
I-75 in Georgetown
US 27 / US 68 in Paris
I-64 in Mt. Sterling
US 60 in Mt. Sterling. The highways travel concurrently through Mt. Sterling.
US 23 in Paintsville. The highways travel concurrently to Pikeville.
US 119 in Pikeville. The highways travel concurrently through Pikeville.
Virginia
US 19 in Claypool Hill. The highways travel concurrently to Bluefield.
West Virginia
US 52 in Bluefield. The highways travel concurrently through Bluefield.
US 19 northeast of Bluefield. The highways travel concurrently to southwest of Princeton.
I-77 east-southeast of Princeton
Virginia
US 219 in Rich Creek
US 11 in Christiansburg
I-81 in Christiansburg. The highways travel concurrently through Christiansburg.
I-81 / US 11 in Christiansburg. US 11/US 460 travels concurrently to Salem.
Future I-73 / I-581 / US 220 in Roanoke
US 11 / US 221 in Roanoke. US 221/US 460 travels concurrently to Bedford.
US 29 south of Lynchburg. The highways travel concurrently to Lynchburg.
US 501 in Lynchburg. The highways travel concurrently through Lynchburg.
US 15 west-northwest of Farmville. The highways travel concurrently to south of Farmville.
US 360 west of Burkeville. The highways travel concurrently to east of Burkeville.
I-85 southwest of Petersburg. The highways travel concurrently to Petersburg.
US 1 southwest of Petersburg
I-85 / I-95 in Petersburg. I-95/US 460 travels concurrently through Petersburg.
US 301 in Petersburg
I-295 southeast of Petersburg
US 258 in Windsor
US 13 / US 58 in Suffolk. The highways travel concurrently to Chesapeake.
I-664 in Chesapeake. The highways travel concurrently through Chesapeake.
I-64 in Chesapeake
US 17 in Chesapeake
I-264 in Norfolk
US 58 in Norfolk. The highways travel concurrently through Norfolk.
I-564 in Norfolk
I-64 in Norfolk
I-64 in Norfolk
US 60 in Norfolk

== See also ==
- Special routes of U.S. Route 460

Browse numbered routes
← US 340	WV	→ I-470
