= Artia =

Artia may refer to:

- Artia, Virginia
- Artia (plant), a genus of Apocynaceae
- Artia (publisher), a Czech publisher
