= Bonsack =

Bonsack is a surname. Notable people with the surname include:

- James Albert Bonsack (1859–1924), American inventor
- Klaus Bonsack (1941–2023), East German luger
- Rose Mary Hatem Bonsack (1933–2020), American politician

== See also ==
- Bonsack, Virginia, unincorporated community in eastern Roanoke County, Virginia, United States
