= Conaway, Virginia =

Unincorporated community in Virginia, United States

- Unincorporated community
- Location within Virginia Location within the United States
- Coordinates: 37°21′08″N 82°12′42″W
- Country: United States
- State: Virginia
- County: Buchanan
- Elevation: 860 ft (260 m)
- Time zone: UTC-5 (Eastern (EST))
  - Summer (DST): UTC-4 (EDT)
- Area code: 276
- GNIS feature ID: 1495419

Conaway is an unincorporated community in Buchanan County, Virginia, United States. Conaway is located along the Levisa Fork and U.S. Route 460, 8 miles (13 km) northwest of Grundy. Conaway had a post office until July 9, 1988.
