= Deel, Virginia =

Unincorporated community in Virginia, United States

- Unincorporated community
- Location within Virginia Location within the United States
- Coordinates: 37°14′10″N 82°05′17″W
- Country: United States
- State: Virginia
- County: Buchanan
- Elevation: 1,394 ft (425 m)
- Time zone: UTC-5 (Eastern (EST))
  - Summer (DST): UTC-4 (EDT)
- Area code: 276
- GNIS feature ID: 1499332

Deel is an unincorporated community in Buchanan County, Virginia, United States. Deel is located on U.S. Route 460, 3 miles (4.8 km) south-southeast of Grundy.

== History ==
A post office was established at Deel in 1908, and remained in operation until it was discontinued in 1957. Raul Deel served as postmaster.
