= Bonsack, Virginia =

- Unincorporated community
- Location within the Commonwealth of Virginia Bonsack, Virginia (the United States)
- Coordinates: 37°14′46″N 80°10′30″W
- Country: United States
- State: Virginia
- County: Roanoke
- Elevation: 1,135 ft (346 m)
- Time zone: UTC-5 (Eastern (EST))
  - Summer (DST): UTC-4 (EDT)
- ZIP Code: 24019 (Roanoke)
- Area codes: 540 and 826
- GNIS feature ID: 1495131
- Other names: Read Mountain

Bonsack is an unincorporated community in eastern Roanoke County, Virginia, United States. The community is located near the junction of US 460 and US 220 Alternate.

== History ==
Bonsack was located along an early road called the "Trader's Path," from Augusta County, Virginia, now part of Highway 460. Established in 1740, the Trader's Path and led from Lynchburg, Virginia to Big Lick, Virginia, and was used to bring settlers and traders from central Virginia into the Roanoke Valley. A large number of German Baptists, also called "Church of the Brethren," settled here after the Revolutionary War, and the community had several different names, including "Glade Creek" and "Stoner's Store". It was named "Bonsack" after the family donated land for a depot and track for the Virginia and Tennessee Railroad, which was constructed in 1852.

"Two blanket factories were located in Bonsack during the Civil War. Legend has it that one blanket factory was burned to the ground by the Yankees. However, the second was spared because its owner, with fingers crossed, promised not to sell blankets to the nearby Confederate merchants down the road in Roanoke City." The blanket factories were owned by Jacob Bonsack (1819–1889). By 1860, the woolen mills employed 18 men and had a value of $21,000.00.

During the Civil War, Bonsack was raided by troops from Union General David Hunter in June 1864. The troops burned the woolen mill and the train depot. They also confiscated food and destroyed personal property. "A number of the railroad-related resources that do survive have been heavily altered, so additional historical research would be needed to document their connection to the railroad. For example, at Bonsack, a turn-of-the-century house survives that was once the stationmaster's house, but this connection would not be obvious merely from an examination of the building. While some railroad resources, such as depots, were often built specifically for that purpose, in other cases, older buildings were reused as the community's needs changed."

The name came, during the 1850s, from the Bonsack family, who donated land for the railroad depot and track through the village.

There was a short mining boom in the 1880s, when deposits of zinc were found on David Plaine's property, near the Bonsack railroad depot. In 1888, about 11,878 tons of zinc ore were shipped out, but mining stopped by 1895.

The Bonsack area was also known for their orchards during the 1920s, and in the large groves they grew apples and peaches. The Roanoke area was ranked eighth in peach production, and ninth in apple production in Virginia, between 1925 and 1939. They also grew pears, grapes, raspberries, plums and strawberries.

The local cemetery in Bonsack has some interesting but also a somewhat haphazard history. "The older part of this cemetery was initially surveyed in 1936 by the Works Progress Administration of Virginia and recorded as the “Bonsack Cemetery ” in Document #8 of the Historical Inventory of Roanoke County, Virginia. The WPA file listed inscriptions from the mid to late 19th-century grave markers for Sarah Bonsack, Susannah Hershberger Bonsack, John Bonsack, and John H. Berry. Although none of the observed grave markers exhibited 18th century dates, the cemetery was thought to date back to 1790.

Today Bonsack has about 20 buildings, and is threatened with development that will change the historic value of the community.

== Education ==
The community is served by Roanoke County Public Schools. Public school students residing in Bonsack are zoned to attend Bonsack Elementary School, William Byrd Middle School, and William Byrd High School.

Higher education institutions are located in Hollins and Roanoke.

== Infrastructure ==
=== Public safety ===
Law enforcement is provided by the Roanoke County Police Department.

Fire protection and emergency medical services are provided by the Roanoke County Fire & Rescue Department, which opened the Bonsack fire station in 2025. Previously, the Read Mountain Fire and Rescue Department, located in nearby Botetourt County, provided fire protection and emergency medical services to the community. The volunteer agency dissolved in 2024 due to lack of membership.

=== Transportation ===
==== Air ====
The Roanoke-Blacksburg Regional Airport is the closest airport with commercial service to the community.

==== Roads ====
- U.S. Route 220A (Challenger Avenue and Cloverdale Road)
- U.S. Route 221 (Challenger Avenue)
- U.S. Route 460 (Challenger Avenue)

==== Rail ====
The Norfolk Southern operated Blue Ridge District runs through the community. The closest passenger rail service is located in Roanoke.

== Bibliography ==
- Blair, Gertrude. Social Customs of the Early Settlers in the Roanoke Valley and Colorful Reminiscences. Roanoke, Va: Works Progress Administration, 1940. http://www.worldcat.org/oclc/796002450
- Hotchkiss, Jedediah. Map of Central Virginia Showing Proposed Southern Extension of the Shenandoah Valley R.R. from Waynesboro to Bonsack's. 1880. http://www.worldcat.org/oclc/63212672
- Kagey, Deedie Dent. 1989. "Roanoke County Communities Started between the Mountains". Journal of the Roanoke Valley Historical Society. 13, no. 1: 7-26. http://www.worldcat.org/oclc/812172701
- Moore, Robert Glenn. Preparation for Marriage A Church Training Program for Young People at Bonsack Baptist Church. 1983. Publication (Historical Commission, Southern Baptist Convention), no. 5568. http://www.worldcat.org/oclc/22366933
