= U.S. Route 219 =

Highway in the United States

U.S. Route 219
- US 219 highlighted in red

Route information
- Auxiliary route of US 19
- Length: 535 mi (861 km)
- Existed: 1926–present

Major junctions
- South end: US 460 in Rich Creek, VA
- I-64 in Lewisburg, WV; US 33 in Elkins, WV; US 50 in Red House, MD; I-68 / US 40 near Grantsville, MD; US 30 near Jennerstown, PA; US 22 near Ebensburg, PA; US 322 in Luthersburg, PA; US 119 near DuBois, PA; I-80 in Falls Creek, PA; I-86 / NY 17 near Salamanca, NY
- North end: I-90 / New York Thruway in West Seneca, NY

Location
- Country: United States
- States: Virginia, West Virginia, Maryland, Pennsylvania, New York

Highway system
- United States Numbered Highway System; List; Special; Divided
← NY 218	NY	→ US 220
← PA 218	PA	→ US 220
← MD 219	MD	→ US 220
← WV 218	WV	→ US 220
← SR 218	VA	→ US 220

U.S. Route 219 (US 219) is a spur of US 19. It runs for 535 miles (861 km) from West Seneca, New York, at an interchange with Interstate 90 (I-90) to Rich Creek, Virginia, intersecting at US 460. US 219 is found (from north to south) in New York, Pennsylvania, Maryland, West Virginia, and Virginia. Much of the Route in West Virginia follows the old Indian warpath known as the Seneca Trail (Great Indian Warpath).

== Route description ==
=== Virginia ===
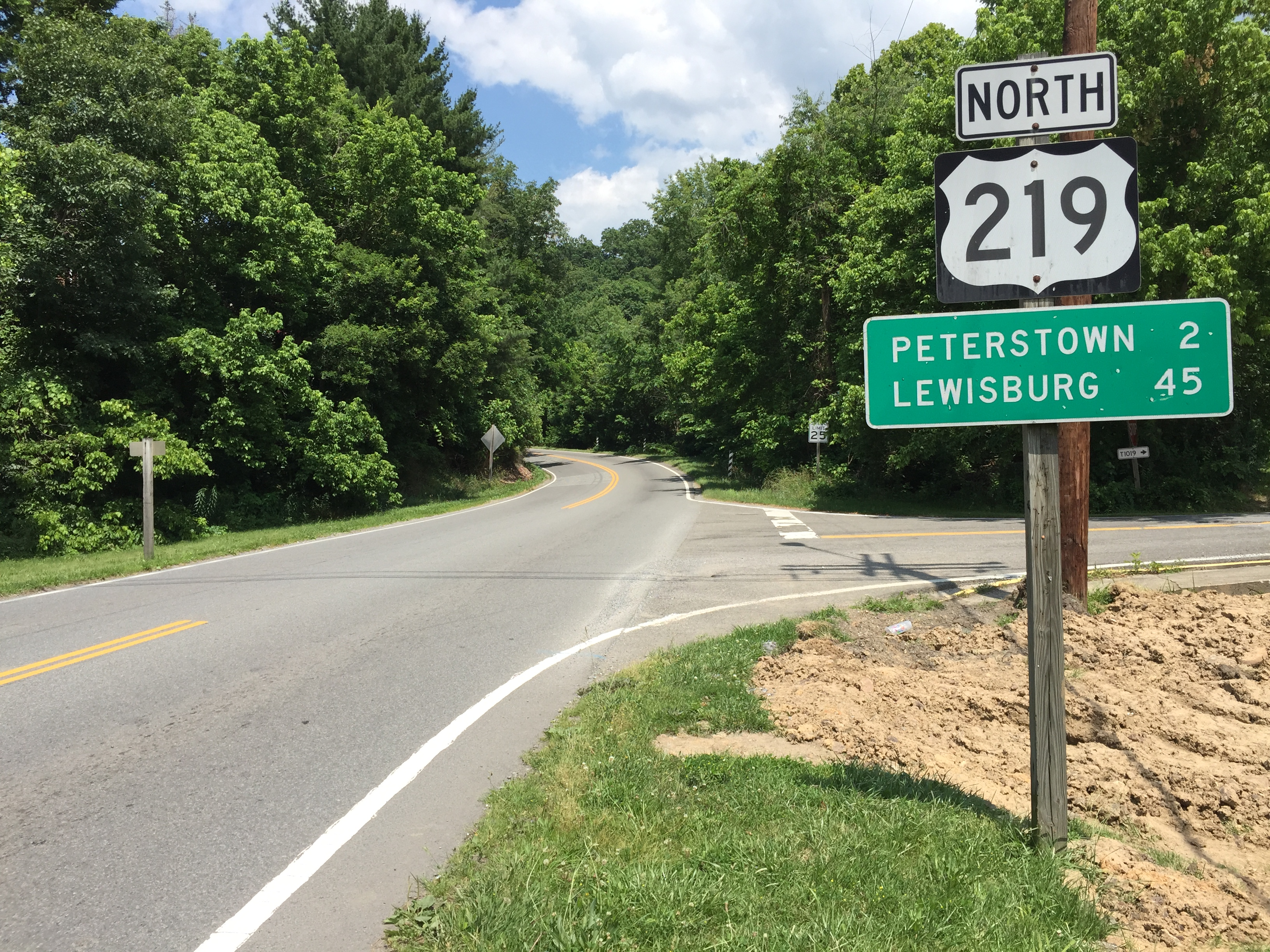
View north near the south end of US 219 at US 460 in Rich Creek

US 219 starts in Rich Creek at US 460, and heads northeast to the West Virginia state line. Until the early 1980s, US 219 continued southwest with US 460 from Rich Creek, re-entering West Virginia to end at US 19 in Bluefield. It now only runs 1.3 miles (2.1 km) in Virginia, and no longer connects to its parent route US 19.

US 219 was initially added to the state highway system in the early 1920s as State Route 231. It became State Route 216 in the 1928 renumbering and State Route 124 in the 1933 renumbering, finally becoming part of the extended US 219 (along with State Route 8, now US 460, west of Rich Creek) in the late 1930s.

=== West Virginia ===
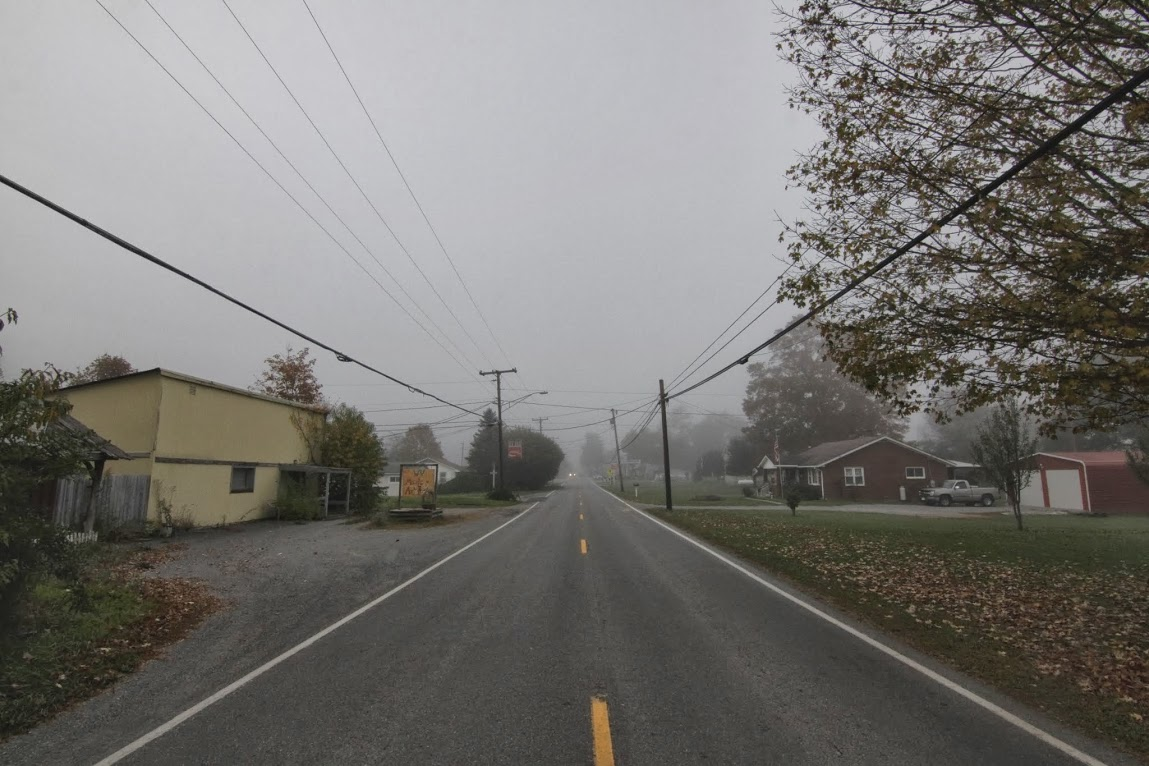
US 219 in Hillsboro

US 219 enters West Virginia in Peterstown at the split of US 219 and WV 12. US 219 then heads northeast into Union. US 219 continues through Greenbrier County running through the towns of Ronceverte, Lewisburg, where it intersects US 60, and Falling Spring. US 219 continues north into Pocahontas County and through the towns of Hillsboro and Marlinton. US 219 runs north into Randolph County and begins its dual certification with US 250. They both serve the towns of Huttonsville, Mill Creek, Beverly, and Elkins, where US 33 joins the concurrency. US 219 splits from US 33 and US 250 just north of Elkins. US 219 continues through the town of Montrose until it enters Tucker County. From here, US 219 runs through the towns of Parsons and Thomas. US 219 heads north into rural Preston County and exits West Virginia into Garrett County, Maryland.

=== Maryland ===
US 219 enters Maryland near Backbone Mountain on the West Virginia border, crosses US 50 and enters the town of Oakland. It crosses Maryland Route 135 and Maryland Route 39 in Oakland, before passing Deep Creek Lake. After traveling through Accident it intersects Interstate 68 east of Friendsville, providing access to Morgantown, West Virginia, Frostburg and Cumberland. US 219 runs concurrently with I-68 at Exit 14A and exits I-68 at Exit 22. US 219 crosses the Mason–Dixon line, the Pennsylvania border, south of Salisbury, Pennsylvania.

=== Pennsylvania ===
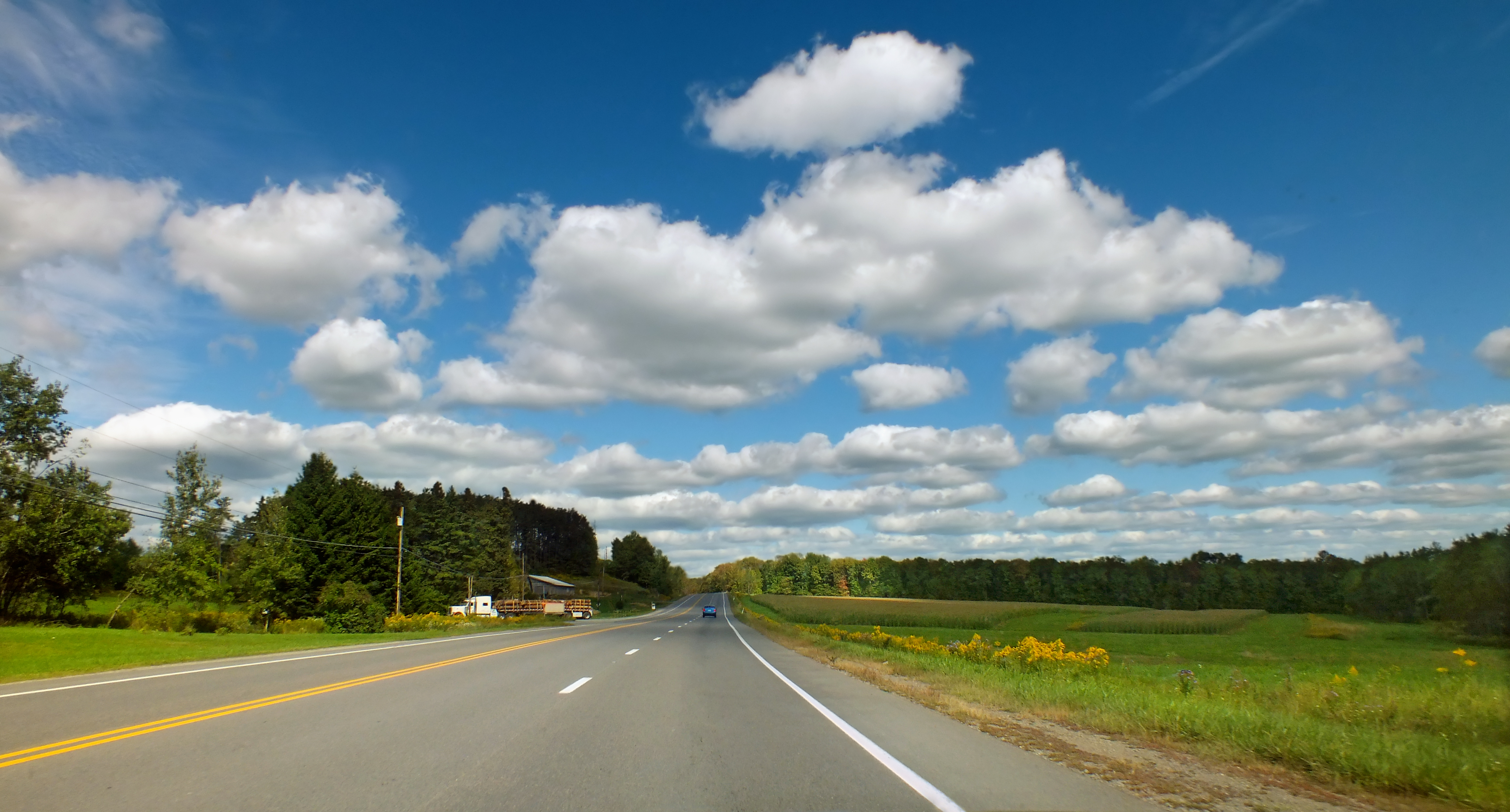
US 219 as seen in Horton Township in Elk County

From near Grantsville, Maryland north to Ebensburg, Pennsylvania, US 219 is Corridor N of the Appalachian Development Highway System. From Meyersdale, Pennsylvania to just south of Carrolltown, Pennsylvania, US 219 is a limited-access highway. A new 11-mile limited-access segment from Meyersdale to Somerset opened to traffic in the late fall of 2018. On August 9, 2007, Pennsylvania State Transportation Secretary Allen D. Biehler unveiled four signs along US Route 219 that dedicated the route from Maryland to Cambria County, Pennsylvania as the "Flight 93 Memorial Highway". From Carrolltown US 219 runs largely as a two-lane road to DuBois, Pennsylvania, through which it runs as Brady Street, and then returns to a two-lane road after a junction with Interstate 80. US 219 runs directly through the towns of Brockway, Ridgway, and Johnsonburg before reaching Wilcox, where PA Route 321 splits and heads for the borough of Kane. US 219 continues north as a two-lane road until reaching Bradford, where it becomes a limited-access highway and remains so until reaching the New York border.

=== New York ===
US 219 enters western New York from Pennsylvania south of the hamlet of Limestone in the town of Carrollton in Cattaraugus County. Proceeding northward, the highway splits into the main route and a "business route" that follows the original main route. The main route merges with Interstate 86/New York State Route 17 at Exit 23 north of Limestone and splits from I-86/NY 17 at Exit 21 in the city of Salamanca. The business route crosses the Allegheny River and the Southern Tier Expressway and joins New York State Route 417 to the city of Salamanca. Separating from NY 417, the business route rejoins with the main US 219 and turns northward through the rest of Cattaraugus County, passing through Peth, Great Valley, Ellicottville, and Ashford Hollow before crossing the Cattaraugus Creek and entering Erie County. About 4 miles south of Springville, New York, US 219 becomes a divided, limited-access highway. As such, it continues north through half of the county, terminating at exit 55 of the New York State Thruway (Interstate 90) near the west town line of West Seneca south of the city of Buffalo. Before joining the Thruway, US 219 runs parallel to it for about one mile (1.6 km). The interchange is set up as such that drivers can exit and re-enter the Thruway via US 219 without leaving the expressway.

== Major intersections ==
Virginia
US 460 in Rich Creek
West Virginia
US 60 in Lewisburg
I-64 in Lewisburg
US 250 in Huttonsville. The highways travel concurrently to north of Elkins.
US 33 in Elkins. The highways travel concurrently to north of Elkins.
Maryland
US 50 in Red House
I-68 / US 40 in Keysers Ridge. The highways travel concurrently to east-southeast of Grantsville.
Pennsylvania
US 30 south-southeast of Boswell
US 22 southwest of Ebensburg
US 422 west of Ebensburg
US 322 in Luthersburg. The highways travel concurrently to south-southeast of Sandy.
US 119 south of Sandy
I-80 east-northeast of Falls Creek
US 6 in Lantz Corners
New York
I-86 in Carrollton. The highways travel concurrently to the City of Salamanca.
US 20A in Orchard Park
I-90 in West Seneca

Browse numbered routes
← SR 218	VA	→ US 220
← WV 218	WV	→ US 220

none	Spurs of SR 23; 1923–1928	SR 232 >
< SR 215	District 2 State Routes; 1928–1933	SR 217 >
