= Artia, Virginia =

Unincorporated community in Virginia, United States

- Unincorporated community
- Location within Virginia Location within the United States
- Coordinates: 37°19′29″N 82°09′50″W
- Country: United States
- State: Virginia
- County: Buchanan
- Elevation: 951 ft (290 m)
- Time zone: UTC-5 (Eastern (EST))
  - Summer (DST): UTC-4 (EDT)
- Area code: 276
- GNIS feature ID: 1497423

Artia is an unincorporated community in Buchanan County, Virginia, United States. Artia is located along U.S. Route 460, 5 miles (8.0 km) northwest of Grundy.
