= Rich Creek, Virginia =

- Town
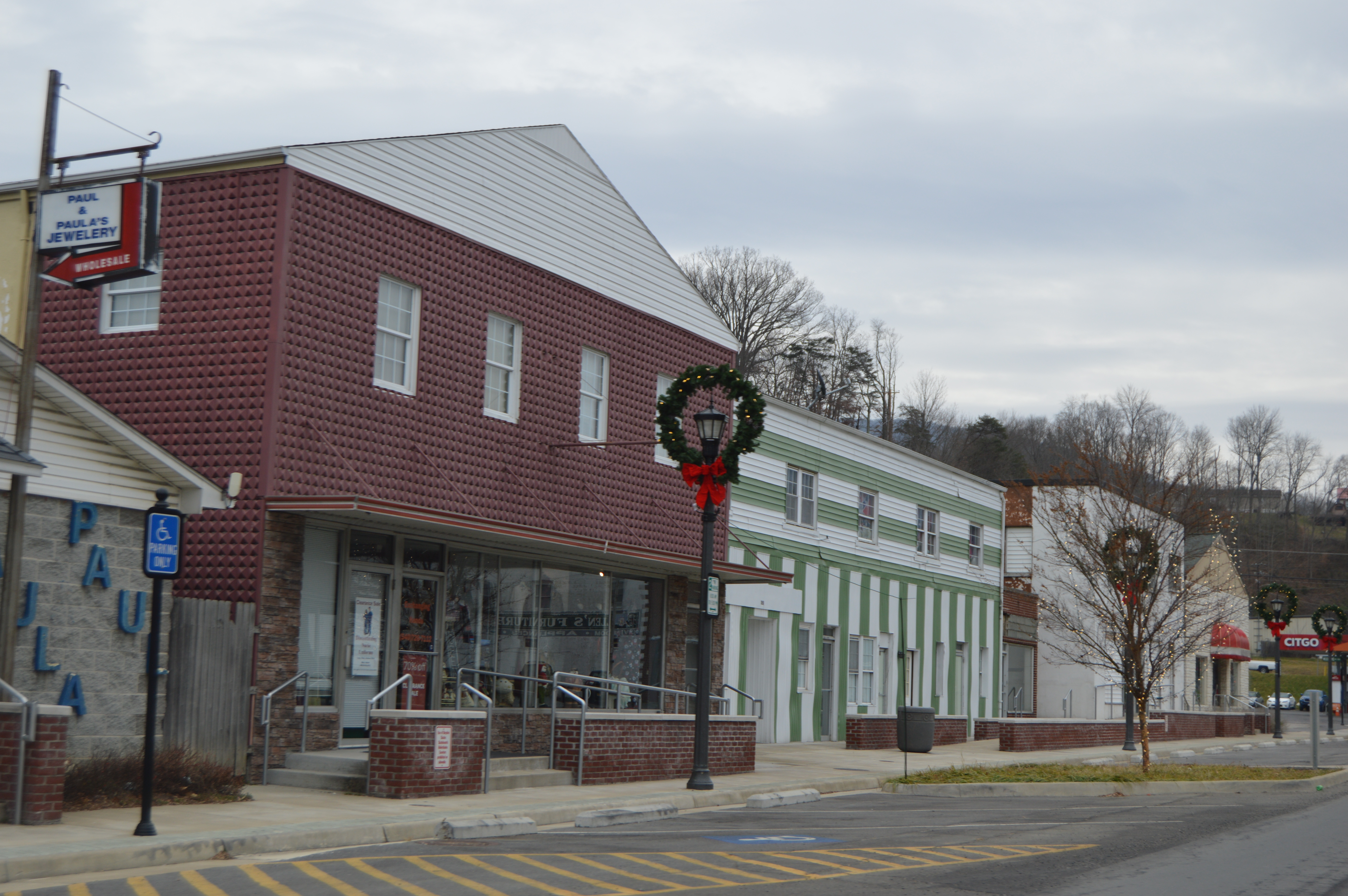
- Old Virginia Avenue in the commercial district

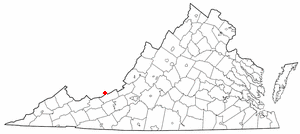
- Location of Rich Creek, Virginia
- Coordinates: 37°23′2″N 80°49′19″W
- Country: United States
- State: Virginia
- County: Giles

Area
  - Total: 0.82 sq mi (2.12 km^{2})
  - Land: 0.82 sq mi (2.12 km^{2})
  - Water: 0 sq mi (0.00 km^{2})
- Elevation: 1,532 ft (467 m)

Population (2020)
  - Total: 749
  - Estimate (2019): 741
  - Density: 904.8/sq mi (349.36/km^{2})
- Time zone: UTC-5 (Eastern (EST))
  - Summer (DST): UTC-4 (EDT)
- ZIP code: 24147
- Area code: 540
- FIPS code: 51-66896
- GNIS feature ID: 1497138
- Website: www.richcreek.org

Rich Creek is a town in Giles County, Virginia, United States. As of the 2020 census, Rich Creek had a population of 749. It is part of the Blacksburg-Christiansburg metropolitan area.

== Geography ==
Rich Creek is located in northwestern Giles County at 37°23′2″N 80°49′19″W (37.383960, -80.821818), on the east side of the New River at the mouth of Rich Creek. U.S. Route 460 passes through the town, leading south (upriver) 4 miles (6 km) to Narrows and west (downriver) 3.5 miles (5.6 km) to Glen Lyn. Pearisburg is 9 miles (14 km) southeast of Rich Creek (upriver).

U.S. Route 219 has its southwestern terminus at US 460 in Rich Creek. It leads northeast 2 miles (3 km) to Peterstown, West Virginia, and ultimately 535 miles (861 km) to West Seneca, New York, near Buffalo.

According to the United States Census Bureau, Rich Creek has a total area of 0.85 square miles (2.2 km^{2}), of which 0.02 square miles (0.05 km^{2}), or 2.28%, are water.

== Demographics ==
Historical population
Census	Pop.	Note	%±
1950	740		—
1960	748		1.1%
1970	729		−2.5%
1980	746		2.3%
1990	670		−10.2%
2000	665		−0.7%
2010	774		16.4%
2020	749		−3.2%
U.S. Decennial Census

At the 2000 census there were 665 people, 277 households, and 186 families living in the town. The population density was 765.0 people per square mile (295.1/km^{2}). There were 312 housing units at an average density of 358.9 per square mile (138.5/km^{2}). The racial makeup of the town was 98.20% White, 1.35% African American, 0.30% Asian, and 0.15% from two or more races. Hispanic or Latino of any race were 0.60%.

Of the 277 households, 22.4% had children under the age of 18 living with them, 55.2% were married couples living together, 9.4% had a female householder with no husband present, and 32.5% were non-families. 30.3% of households were one person and 14.4% were one person aged 65 or older. The average household size was 2.19 and the average family size was 2.71.

The age distribution was 17.4% under the age of 18, 5.0% from 18 to 24, 23.3% from 25 to 44, 27.2% from 45 to 64, and 27.1% 65 or older. The median age was 48 years. For every 100 females there were 87.3 males. For every 100 females aged 18 and over, there were 79.4 males.

The median household income was $34,519 and the median family income was $43,958. Males had a median income of $31,417 versus $21,250 for females. The per capita income for the town was $18,553. About 7.9% of families and 13.1% of the population were below the poverty line, including 21.8% of those under age 18 and 2.0% of those age 65 or over.
