= Ripplemead, Virginia =

Unincorporated community in Virginia, United States

- Unincorporated community Census designated place
- Location within Shenandoah Valley Location within Virginia Location within the United States
- Coordinates: 37°20′13″N 80°41′10″W
- Country: United States
- State: Virginia
- County: Giles

Area
  - Total: 1.22 sq mi (3.16 km^{2})
  - Land: 1.13 sq mi (2.93 km^{2})
  - Water: 0.089 sq mi (0.23 km^{2})
- Elevation: 1,828 ft (557 m)
- Time zone: UTC-5 (Eastern (EST))
  - Summer (DST): UTC-4 (EDT)
- ZIP code: 24150
- Area code: 540
- GNIS feature ID: 1497117

Ripplemead is an unincorporated community and census designated place (CDP) in Giles County, Virginia, United States. As of the 2020 census, Ripplemead had a population of 306. Ripplemead is located along the New River, 2.8 miles (4.5 km) east-northeast of Pearisburg. Ripplemead has a post office with ZIP code 24150.

== Demographics ==
Ripplemead first appeared as a census designated place in the 2020 U.S. census.
