= Grimsleyville, Virginia =

Unincorporated community in Virginia, United States

Coordinates: 37°10′05″N 81°54′10″W

Grimsleyville is an unincorporated community in Buchanan County, Virginia, United States.

== History ==
A post office was established at Grimsleyville in 1934, and remained in operation until it was discontinued in 1958. The community was named for James Grimsley, who kept a store there.
