= Pisgah, Virginia =

- Unincorporated community
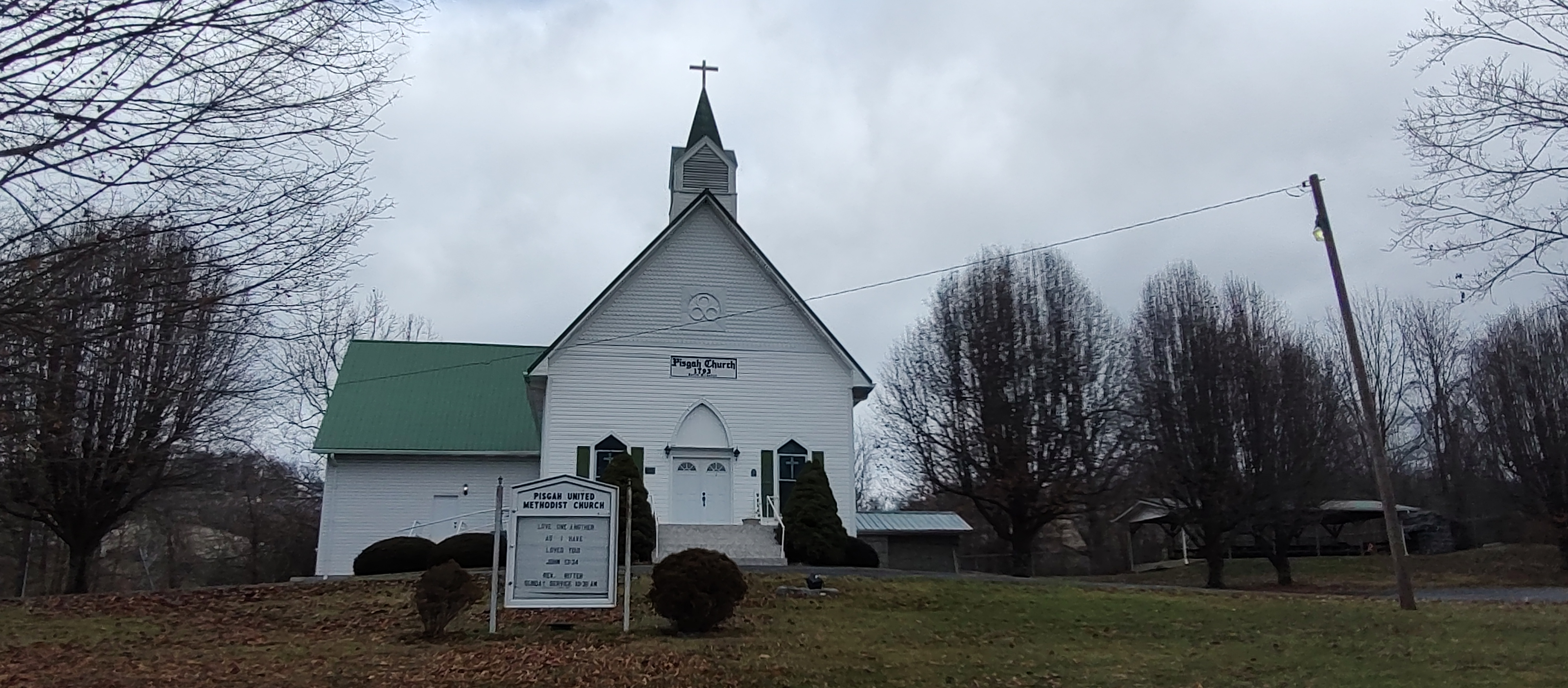
- Pisgah Methodist Church

- Location within Virginia Location within the United States
- Coordinates: 37°07′15″N 81°34′24″W
- Country: United States
- State: Virginia
- County: Tazewell
- Elevation: 2,359 ft (719 m)
- Time zone: UTC-5 (Eastern (EST))
  - Summer (DST): UTC-4 (EDT)
- Area code: 276
- GNIS feature ID: 1499880

Pisgah is an unincorporated community located in Tazewell County, Virginia, United States.
