= Claypool Hill, Virginia =

- Census-designated place (CDP)
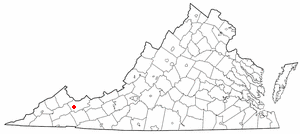
- Location of Claypool Hill, Virginia
- Coordinates: 37°3′46″N 81°45′23″W
- Country: United States
- State: Virginia
- County: Tazewell

Area
  - Total: 3.9 sq mi (10.1 km^{2})
  - Land: 3.9 sq mi (10.1 km^{2})
  - Water: 0 sq mi (0.0 km^{2})
- Elevation: 2,349 ft (716 m)

Population (2010)
  - Total: 1,776
  - Density: 455/sq mi (176/km^{2})
- Time zone: UTC−5 (Eastern (EST))
  - Summer (DST): UTC−4 (EDT)
- FIPS code: 51-17120
- GNIS feature ID: 1464963

Claypool Hill is a census-designated place (CDP) in Tazewell County, Virginia, United States. As of the 2020 census, Claypool Hill had a population of 1,699. Claypool is part of the Bluefield WV-VA micropolitan area which has a population of 107,578.

== Geography ==
Claypool Hill is located at 37°3′46″N 81°45′23″W (37.062842, −81.756355).

According to the United States Census Bureau, the CDP has a total area of 3.9 square miles (10.1 km^{2}), all land.

== Demographics ==
Historical population
Census	Pop.	Note	%±
2000	1,719		—
2020	1,699		—
U.S. Decennial Census; 2010

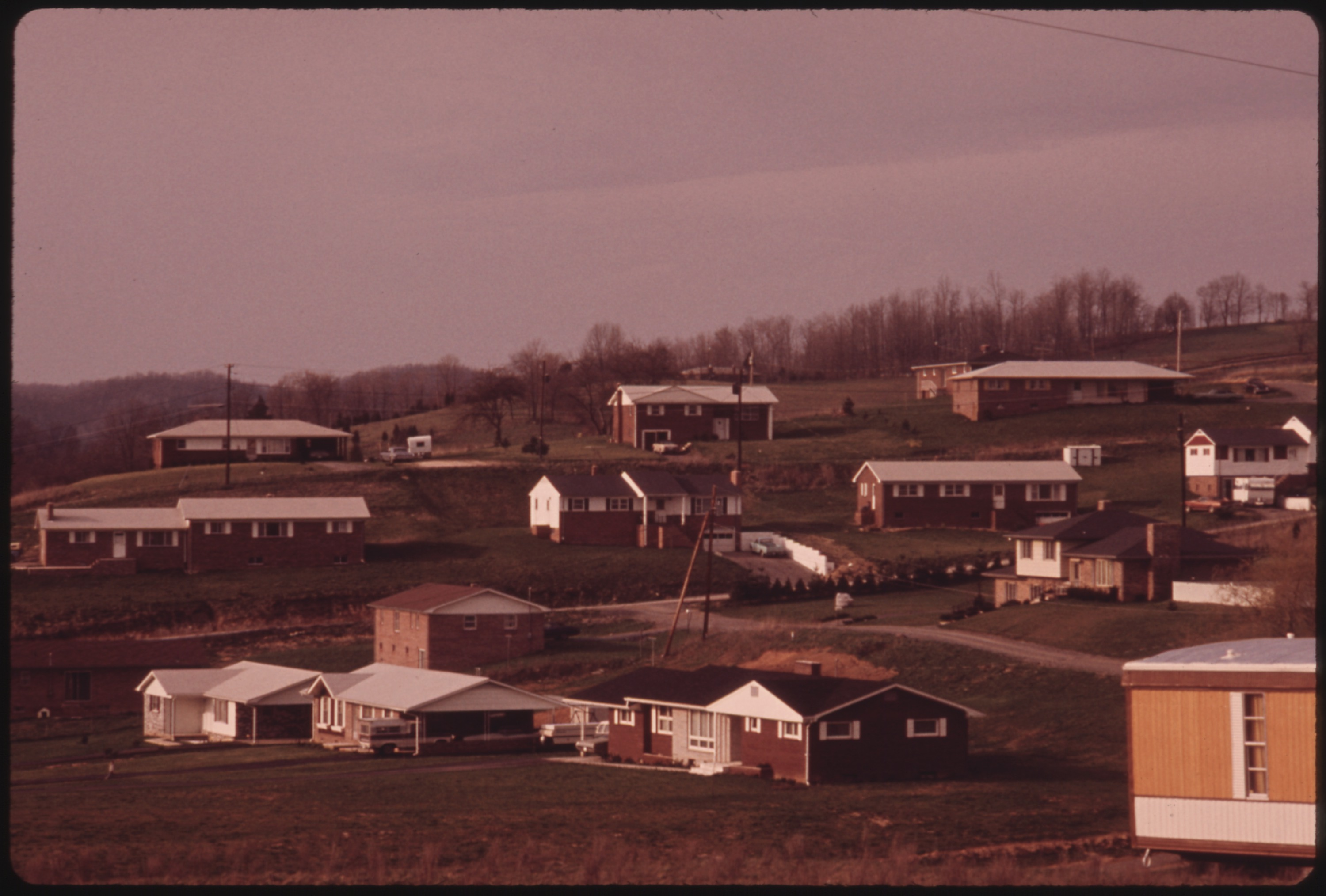
Homes in Claypool Hill, 1974

=== 2020 census ===
As of the 2020 census, Claypool Hill had a population of 1,699. The median age was 45.8 years. 19.4% of residents were under the age of 18 and 26.0% of residents were 65 years of age or older. For every 100 females there were 97.6 males, and for every 100 females age 18 and over there were 96.6 males age 18 and over.

63.9% of residents lived in urban areas, while 36.1% lived in rural areas.

There were 712 households in Claypool Hill, of which 24.4% had children under the age of 18 living in them. Of all households, 56.6% were married-couple households, 16.0% were households with a male householder and no spouse or partner present, and 24.2% were households with a female householder and no spouse or partner present. About 28.1% of all households were made up of individuals and 15.5% had someone living alone who was 65 years of age or older.

There were 777 housing units, of which 8.4% were vacant. The homeowner vacancy rate was 1.6% and the rental vacancy rate was 10.3%.

Racial composition as of the 2020 census
Race	Number	Percent
White	1,612	94.9%
Black or African American	12	0.7%
American Indian and Alaska Native	1	0.1%
Asian	14	0.8%
Native Hawaiian and Other Pacific Islander	0	0.0%
Some other race	10	0.6%
Two or more races	50	2.9%
Hispanic or Latino (of any race)	15	0.9%

=== 2000 census ===
As of the census of 2000, there were 1,719 people, 710 households, and 565 families residing in the CDP. The population density was 442.3 people per square mile (170.6/km^{2}). There were 760 housing units at an average density of 195.5/sq mi (75.4/km^{2}). The racial makeup of the CDP was 98.95% White, 0.06% African American, 0.17% Native American, 0.52% Asian, 0.12% from other races, and 0.17% from two or more races. Hispanic or Latino of any race were 1.11% of the population.

There were 710 households, out of which 29.3% had children under the age of 18 living with them, 68.0% were married couples living together, 8.7% had a female householder with no husband present, and 20.4% were non-families. 18.9% of all households were made up of individuals, and 7.0% had someone living alone who was 65 years of age or older. The average household size was 2.42 and the average family size was 2.74.

In the CDP, the population was spread out, with 20.0% under the age of 18, 6.6% from 18 to 24, 27.1% from 25 to 44, 33.7% from 45 to 64, and 12.6% who were 65 years of age or older. The median age was 42 years. For every 100 females, there were 89.7 males. For every 100 females age 18 and over, there were 89.3 males.

The median income for a household in the CDP was $36,382, and the median income for a family was $42,321. Males had a median income of $30,878 versus $21,493 for females. The per capita income for the CDP was $19,588. About 9.5% of families and 13.1% of the population were below the poverty line, including 21.5% of those under age 18 and 7.0% of those age 65 or over.
