= Trader's Path =

Colonial highway in Virginia, U.S.

The Trader's Path was a colonial highway through southwestern Virginia, established in 1740.

The Trader's Path was an early road from Augusta County, Virginia, now part of US 460 and US 220 Alternate. Established in 1740, the Trader's Path led from Lynchburg, Virginia to Big Lick, Virginia (now known as Roanoke, Virginia), and was used to bring settlers and traders from central Virginia into the Roanoke Valley.

Earlier accounts of the Trader's Path date to the middle and later 17th century. "During the 1600s, some white men from eastern Virginia took what they called the "Trader's Path" into the western country, where they trapped and traded. They crossed the Blue Ridge Mountains not far from present-day Floyd, Virginia and made their way into the New River Valley. Not primarily interested in exploring or map making, let alone establishing permanent farms and communities, they depended on friendly relations with Indians and profitable relations with fur-bearing animals. Deliberate exploration parties pushed west across the Blue Ridge as early as the 1670s, long before the settlement of what is now Montgomery County. Abraham Wood sent out a party of exploration, probably along the Trader's Path, in 1671 from what is now Petersburg, Virginia. The party included his brother, Thomas Wood; Thomas Batts, Robert Fallam; and an Indian guide, Perecute. The men made their way up the Roanoke River to present-day Salem, Virginia, across the Allegheny Ridge, along Stroubles Creek, and down a river-they called it Wood's River, though it later acquired the name New River-into present-day western Giles County, Virginia. Since the New River joins the Ohio River, the 1671 expedition to the New River provided one basis for England's claims to the Ohio Valley."

Part of the Trader's Path continued along part of Merriman Road in Roanoke, and past the historic Starkey School.

"The earliest route used by white men through Montgomery County, Virginia was the Trader's Path, which connected Montgomery with the areas to the east beyond the Blue Ridge. It crossed the Blue Ridge between Franklin and Floyd counties and may have followed the Little River to a ford of the New River at or near Ingles Ferry. Batts and Fallam very likely followed this path on their exploration to the New River in 1671."

This was also the earliest known road through Floyd County, Virginia, "...running east to west, and crossing the Roanoke River where Back Creek enters the river, thence by John Mason's, R. Poague's, the headwaters of Back Creek and southwest over Bent Mountain. It continued westward through the Little River (New River) area to the Lead Mines. No doubt many traders and hunters whose names were never recorded followed the Trader's Path and Indian Trails through the Appalachian country in pursuit of this trade."

== Bibliography ==
- Carter, Nora. 2009. "Old Roads of Bedford County". Bedford Genealogical Society Quarterly. 23, no. 2: 26–27. Notes: Written by a WPA project under the Conservation and Development Commission in 1938, and a copy given to Mrs. George P. Parker, historian of Peaks of Otter Chapter, D.A.R. by the author ...Includes extensive list of mills (names and locations) on p. 27. http://www.worldcat.org/oclc/416577165.
