= Buchanan County Public Schools =

School district in Virginia

Buchanan County Public Schools is the school district in charge of all public schools in Buchanan County, Virginia. The school system is managed by the school board, headquartered in Grundy, Virginia, and the superintendent is Melanie Hibbits. As of 2007, the school system's per pupil expenditure was $10,219, and its graduation rate was 75.7% in 2008.

== Schools ==
=== Elementary/Middle Schools ===
- Council Elementary/Middle School, Council
- Hurley Elementary/Middle School, Hurley
- Riverview Elementary/Middle School, Grundy
- Twin Valley Elementary/Middle School, Oakwood

=== High schools ===
- Council High School, Council
- Grundy Senior High School, Grundy
- Hurley High School, Hurley
- Twin Valley High School, Pilgrim's Knob

=== Specialty schools ===
- B.C.C.T.H.L.C Buchanan County Career, Technology & Higher Learning Center
