= Whitewood, Virginia =

Unincorporated community in Virginia, United States

Whitewood
- Unincorporated community
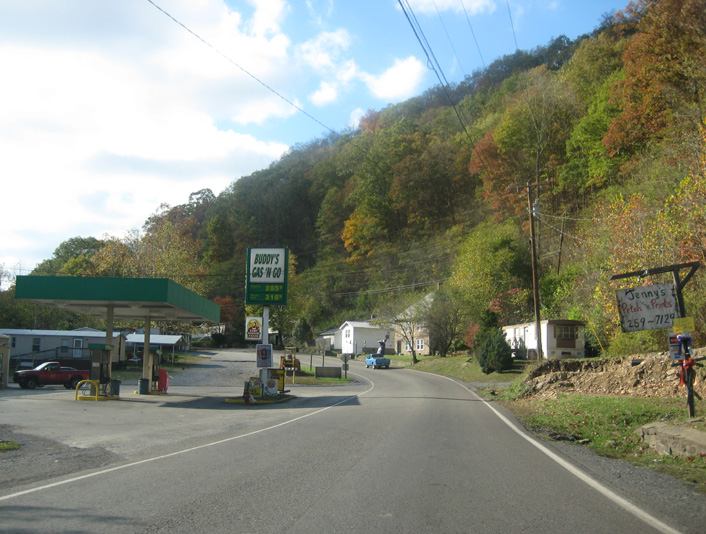
- Whitewood, Va.

- Location within the Commonwealth of Virginia Whitewood (the United States)
- Coordinates: 37°14′08″N 81°51′25″W
- Country: United States
- State: Virginia
- County: Buchanan

Population (2000)
  - Total: 485
- Time zone: UTC−5 (Eastern (EST))
  - Summer (DST): UTC−4 (EDT)
- ZIP codes: 24657
- Area code: (276)

Whitewood is an unincorporated community in Buchanan County, Virginia, United States. As of the 2000 census, the Whitewood area had a population of 485. It is located along the Dismal River, which is part of the watershed of the Big Sandy River.

== History ==
The community was initially settled in the early 1900s by lumber companies that arrived to log the forests of the surrounding hills. The settlement was named Whitewood, supposedly after the color of the lumber, shortly after the first lumber mill was established in 1905. The Whitewood post office was established in 1906.

In September 2008, Whitewood High School, built in 1940, was placed on the National Register of Historic Places. It was demolished in early 2010.

On July 12, 2022, the community was heavily damaged by a catastrophic flood.

== Education ==
=== Public High Schools ===
- Twin Valley High School, Pilgrim's Knob

== Notable person ==
- Ruth White, author.
