= Appalachian College of Pharmacy =

Private doctoral pharmacy school in Oakwood, Virginia, US

- Type: Doctor of Pharmacy, Doctor of Public Health and Certified Pharmacy Technician
- Established: 2003
- President: Michael McGlothlin
- Dean: Susan L. Mayhew
- Faculty: 28
- Students: 150
- Location: 1060 Dragon Road, Oakwood, VA 24631, Oakwood, Virginia, USA
- Campus: Rural
- Website: http://www.acp.edu/

The Appalachian College of Pharmacy (ACP), formerly known as the University of Appalachia, College of Pharmacy, is a private doctoral pharmacy school located in Oakwood, Virginia. The school, established in 2003, is Virginia's only three-year accelerated Doctor of Pharmacy program. ACP's mission is to improve the health outcomes of rural and underserved communities, particularly those in Central Appalachia, through education, service, and scholarship.

== History ==
In 2003, citing a need to address a higher than normal age adjusted mortality rate (42% higher locally as opposed to the rest of Virginia) and a national pharmacist shortage, local leaders in Buchanan County, Virginia began to explore the possibility of founding a new pharmacy school in the region. Spurred by the existence of the Appalachian School of Law, the Buchanan County Board of Supervisors commissioned County Attorney Frank Kilgore to found the University of Appalachia, College of Pharmacy. The school matriculated its first class of students in August 2005, with Edgar R. Gonzalez as president and founding dean, and graduated its first class in May 2008.

In March 2009, in order to facilitate its application for accreditation from the Southern Association of Colleges and Schools (SACS), the school changed its name from the University of Appalachia, College of Pharmacy to the Appalachian College of Pharmacy. This change was made because the previous name did not "accurately represent the singular stand-alone nature of the College’s operations."

ACP, like the Appalachian School of Law, was envisioned to become an economic redevelopment tool for the region. Since the college opened, an apartment complex, multiple multi-family housing units, restaurants, and a Walmart have opened less than fifteen miles from the college. The school has been estimated to have added $20 million per year to the local economy.

== Academics ==
ACP is one of fewer than twenty colleges of pharmacy in the United States that offers a three-year accelerated Doctor of Pharmacy program (Most Doctor of Pharmacy programs take four years to complete). A minimum of 140 credits and more than 1,700 hours of experiential coursework are required for graduation. The majority of experiential coursework occurs during the third year of study, while didactic coursework is conducted during the first two years.

== Accreditation ==
ACP received full accreditation from the Accreditation Council for Pharmacy Education (ACPE) in January 2010, after becoming eligible after the first class of students graduated in May 2008. The college was awarded full accreditation from the Southern Association of Colleges and Schools (SACS) in December 2011, rendering students eligible to apply for Title IV federal financial aid. Additionally, ACP is certified by the State Council of Higher Education for Virginia (SCHEV) to operate in Virginia and confer the Doctor of Pharmacy degree.

== Admissions ==
ACP requires that applicants apply online via PharmCAS (the Pharmacy College Application Service). Each applicant must also complete and submit a supplemental application directly to ACP. Beginning in April 2014, international applicants, not living in the United States, became eligible to apply.

== Facilities ==
The college's first campus, known as the Slate Creek campus, was located four miles (6 km) east of Grundy, Virginia. This facility opened in 2005 to the inaugural class as their primary facility for study and closed in June 2009 when the college moved all operations and activities to its present location.

The college's Garden campus, located in Oakwood, Virginia, opened in the fall of 2006 as the academic facilities for the second class of students enrolled at ACP. Garden Hall, a building constructed in the Georgian architectural style by the Civilian Conservation Corps (CCC) in 1940 and the former site of Garden High School (1940-2000), comprises 25,000 square feet and was fully renovated in 2005 with a new student laboratory, library, offices, boardroom, faculty and student lounge, and student gymnasium.

In January 2008, construction of an adjoining building began at the Garden campus to consolidate the college onto one campus. McGlothlin Hall, now the primary academic building, opened in June 2009, adding two student lecture halls, eight breakout rooms, and a faculty laboratory, more than doubling the size of the college campus, with an additional 30,000 square feet. An Office of Research opened in June 2013 in McGlothlin Hall, at which time additional laboratory equipment was purchased to support research involving cancer biomarkers and drug targets.

Two nearby buildings of more than 10,000 square feet, former sites of the Hagy Café and United Central Industrial Supply Company, were purchased in September 2013 and are being renovated to expand overnight accommodations and research and medication management services to Central Appalachia. The campus now totals more than eight acres.

== NAPLEX Pass Rates ==
The class of 2021 had a 66% first attempt pass rate compared to a national rate of 84% and placed the college in lowest 5% of all pharmacy programs. In 2019, 79.4% of students from Appalachian College of Pharmacy passed the NAPLEX on the first attempt compared to a national rate of 87.9% The Class of 2015 achieved the highest first-attempt pass rate for the North American Pharmacists Licensure Examination (NAPLEX) thus far for Appalachian College of Pharmacy graduates, at 95.89%, higher than the national average (92.64%) for 2015 and the highest of all colleges of pharmacy in Virginia (94.44%). The Class of 2015's first-time pass rate for their professional licensure exam is the second successive year of record-breaking NAPLEX first-time pass rates for ACP and again the highest first-time pass rate for all Doctor of Pharmacy degree programs in the state of Virginia. ACP's Class of 2015 achieved the second-highest NAPLEX® first-time pass rate of all accelerated, three-year Doctor of Pharmacy (PharmD) degree programs and in the top-third of all colleges of pharmacy in the United States.

The Class of 2014's overall pass rate for the North American Pharmacists Licensure Examination was 95.83%, with 95.65% of students passing in their first attempt. The Class of 2014 also achieved overall and first-attempt pass rates that were higher than the national averages (94.48%, 94.88% respectively) for 2014 and the highest 2014 pass rates of all colleges of pharmacy in Virginia.

== Post Graduate Year 1 (PGY-1) Pharmacy Residency Program ==
A PGY-1 community-based residency program began in July 2011 and was expanded in July 2012 from one residency position to three. It received full accreditation from the American Society of Health-System Pharmacists (ASHP) in spring 2014.

== Student life ==
=== Community service ===
The college implemented the innovative Pharmacists in Community Service (PICS) student program, where each student must volunteer a total of one-hundred and fifty hours of community service during their three years of enrollment (fifty hours each academic year) as a requirement for graduation. Students are required to complete one hundred hours of community service before beginning Advanced Pharmacy Practice Experience (APPE) rotations their third year. With approval from the Experiential Education Director prior to service, students can choose or develop their own volunteer activities and serve at their own pace, granted that one hundred hours have been completed by the end of their second year. Of the total one-hundred fifty hours, one hundred community service hours must be health-related, fifty of which must provide patient care, as part of the college's mission to improve the health-related needs of rural and underserved communities. Among the activities students have contributed to are the Appalachia Service Project, Blessings in a Backpack, March of Dimes' March for Babies, Open Airways project, Relay For Life, Remote Area Medical clinics, and the Susan G. Komen for the Cure.

In July 2011, the college opened the Mountain Care Center, a community clinic that provides health screenings, medication therapy management, and a prescription assistance program for community residents who are uninsured and unable to afford their medications. In addition, health and wellness programs such as smoking cessation and nutrition counseling are available. A nurse practitioner, affiliated with the Health Wagon, joined the clinic in 2014 on a part-time basis.

=== Student organizations ===
ACP has eleven student organizations:

- American Pharmacists Association–Academy of Student Pharmacists (APhA-ASP)
- American Society of Health-System Pharmacists (ASHP)
- Apothecary Medicinal Plants Society (AMPS)
- Conservative Student Action (CSA)
- Fellowship of Christian Pharmacists (FCP)
- Kappa Psi - Epsilon Delta chapter
- National Community Pharmacists Association (NCPA)
- Phi Delta Chi - Gamma Gamma chapter
- Phi Lambda Sigma - Delta Iota chapter
- Rho Chi Society
- Student Government Association
- Student Leadership Council
