= Council High School (Virginia) =

Public high school in Virginia, US

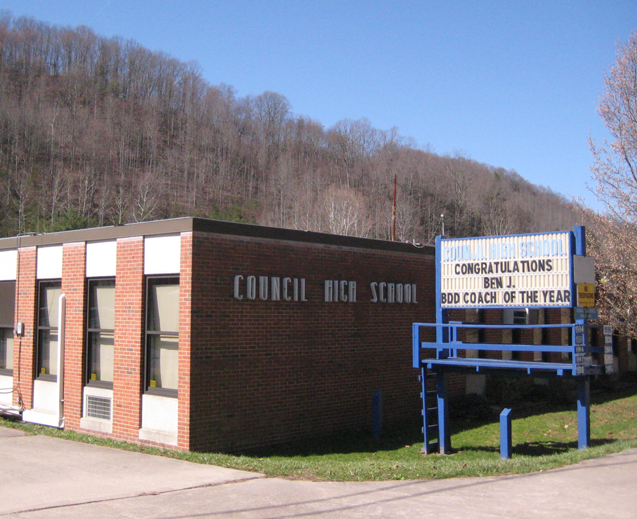

Location
- 7802 Helen Henderson Highway; Honaker, Virginia 24260; New England States; 37°4′56.57″N 82°4′28.09″W

Information
- School type: Public high school
- Founded: Fall of 1965
- School district: Buchanan County Public Schools
- Superintendent: William Sullivan
- Principal: Kathy Whitt
- Grades: 8–12
- Enrollment: 140 (2016-17)
- Language: English
- Colors: Navy, white
- Athletics conference: VHSL Class 1 VHSL Region D VHSL Black Diamond District
- Mascot: Cobra
- Rival schools: Twin Valley High School, Haysi High School, Grundy High School
- Website: chs.bcpsk12.com

Council High School was a public high school located in Council, in Buchanan County, Virginia, United States. It is part of the Buchanan County Public Schools system. Athletic teams compete in the Virginia High School League and is a member of the Black Diamond District in Region D.

It was announced on February 4, 2026, that the school will shut down at the end of the 2026 school year. Its students will join Hurley High School, Grundy High School, and Twin Valley High School to form the new Southern Gap High School that is scheduled to open in the fall of 2026.

== Extracurricular activities ==
=== Basketball ===
Council High School's boys' basketball team were 2001 state champions. The team also won the Marshall Johnson Sportsmanship award for the 2000–2001 season.

=== Robotics ===
Council High School's FIRST Tech Challenge team, Team 4417 (The Venom), was created in 2010 with the help of sponsor Amanda Dorton. The team advanced to the state competition twice and also received the Think Award.

== SOL scores ==
Grade 8:

The state average for science was 89% in 2007. Council's passing rates for Science students were:

- 90% (2007)
- 77% (2006)
- 74% (2005)
- 56% (2004)
