= Keen Mountain, Virginia =

Unincorporated community in Virginia, United States

Keen Mountain
- Unincorporated community
- Location within the Commonwealth of Virginia Keen Mountain (the United States)
- Coordinates: 37°12′14″N 81°58′48″W
- Country: United States
- State: Virginia
- County: Buchanan
- Time zone: UTC−5 (Eastern (EST))
  - Summer (DST): UTC−4 (EDT)
- ZIP codes: South Grundy, VA 24631
- GNIS feature ID: 1495773

Keen Mountain is an unincorporated community in Buchanan County, Virginia, United States, located on U.S. Route 460, just south of the community of Oakwood.

The Keen Mountain post office was established in 1937. The community was named in honor of William Keen and family, pioneer settlers.
