= Wolford, Virginia =

Unincorporated community in Virginia, United States

- Unincorporated community
- Location within Virginia Location within the United States
- Coordinates: 37°21′52″N 81°59′28″W
- Country: United States
- State: Virginia
- County: Buchanan
- Elevation: 1,194 ft (364 m)
- Time zone: UTC−5 (Eastern (EST))
  - Summer (DST): UTC−4 (EDT)
- ZIP code: 24658
- Area code: 276
- GNIS feature ID: 1497221

Wolford is an unincorporated community in Buchanan County, Virginia, United States. Wolford is 8.4 miles (13.5 km) northeast of Grundy. Wolford has a post office with ZIP code 24658, which opened on August 22, 1949. The community was likely named for John Wolford, a pioneer.
