= Jewell Valley, Virginia =

Unincorporated community in Virginia, United States

- Unincorporated community
- Location within Virginia Location within the United States
- Coordinates: 37°14′50″N 81°48′05″W
- Country: United States
- State: Virginia
- County: Buchanan
- Elevation: 1,896 ft (578 m)
- Time zone: UTC-5 (Eastern (EST))
  - Summer (DST): UTC-4 (EDT)
- Area code: 276
- GNIS feature ID: 1495761

Jewell Valley is an unincorporated community in southwestern Virginia, located in Buchanan County, Virginia, United States. Jewell Valley is 16.5 miles (26.6 km) east of Grundy.

Jewell Valley contained a post office from 1937 until 1984. The community was named in honor of the Jewell family.
