= Grundy Senior High School =

Public high school in Virginia, US

Grundy High School
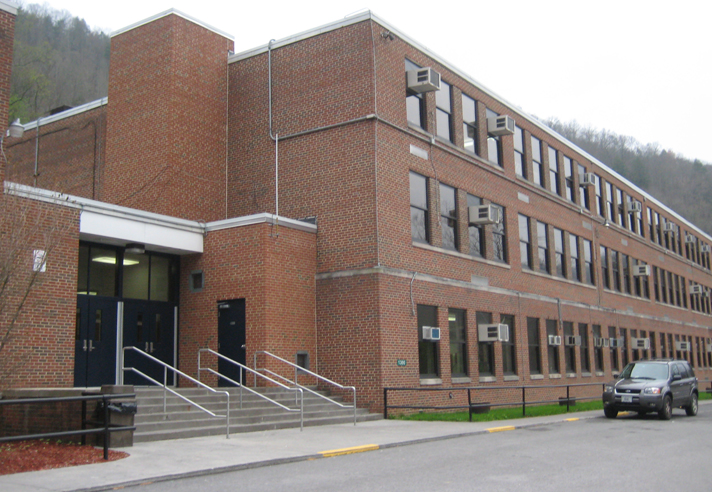

Location
- 1300 Goldenwave Dr. Grundy, Virginia 24614; United States; 37°17′00.0″N 82°3′41″W

Information
- School type: Public high school
- Founded: 1963
- School district: Buchanan County Public Schools
- Superintendent: Melanie Hibbitts
- Principal: Karen Brown
- Grades: 9–12
- Enrollment: 362 (2020-21)
- Language: English
- Colors: Navy & Gold
- Athletics conference: VHSL Class 1 VHSL Region D VHSL Black Diamond District
- Mascot: Wave Man
- Rival Schools: Christiansburg High School, Hurley High School, Twin Valley High School
- Website: Official Site

Grundy High School was a public high school located east of Grundy, Virginia on Slate Creek in Buchanan County, Virginia. It was part of the Buchanan County Public Schools system. Athletic teams competed in the Virginia High School League's Black Diamond District in the Region D Conference. Grundy was a National Blue Ribbon School.

Following the closing of Grundy Junior High at the end of the 1994-1995 school year, the High School's name was changed from Grundy Senior High School to Grundy High School.

At the end of the 2025-2026 school year, Grundy Senior High School closed and consolidated with three other Buchanan County High Schools to create the new Southern Gap High School.

== Wrestling ==
The school was renowned for its wrestling program, which won 27 state championships, the most of any high school in Virginia, and has been ranked nationally. Grundy has produced more than 80 individual state champions.

State Wrestling Tournament
Class	Finish	Year(s)
AA	First	1978, 1987-1998, 2000, 2001
AA	Second	2002, 2003, 2005, 2008, 2010, 2011
A	First	2012, 2013
2A	First	2014, 2016, 2017
2A	Second	2015
1	First	2018, 2019, 2020, 2021, 2022, 2023, 2024

Current Iowa State University wrestling coach Kevin Dresser was the head coach 1989-1996. Travis Fiser was the head coach 1997-2026.

== Notable alumni ==
- Lee Smith - Author (attended two years)
- Jayma Mays - Actress (Red Eye, Paul Blart Mall Cop, Epic Movie, Glee)
- Ryan O'Quinn - Actor
- Heath Calhoun - US paralympian, Wounded Warrior Project spokesperson
- Beverly Perdue - Former Governor of North Carolina
- Francis Gary Powers - CIA pilot shot down flying a reconnaissance mission over the Soviet Union, precipitating the 1960 U2 Incident.
- Vernon C. Smith (1892–1963), member of the Virginia House of Delegates
