= Venia, Virginia =

Unincorporated community in Virginia, United States

Coordinates: 37°05′28″N 82°02′59″W

Venia is an unincorporated community in Buchanan County, Virginia, United States.

== History ==
A post office was established at Venia in 1923, and remained in operation until it was discontinued in 1965. Venia Buchanan was an early postmaster.
