= Rowe, Virginia =

Unincorporated community in Virginia, United States

- Unincorporated community
- Location within Virginia Location within the United States
- Coordinates: 37°08′10″N 82°01′57″W
- Country: United States
- State: Virginia
- County: Buchanan
- Elevation: 1,709 ft (521 m)
- Time zone: UTC-5 (Eastern (EST))
  - Summer (DST): UTC-4 (EDT)
- ZIP code: 24646
- Area code: 276
- GNIS feature ID: 1499998

Rowe is an unincorporated community in Buchanan County, Virginia, United States. Rowe is located on State Route 624, six miles south of Oakwood. Rowe has a post office with ZIP code 24646, which opened on January 25, 1939.

It was likely named for John S. Rowe, a pioneer settler.
