= Operation Big Coon Dog =

FBI investigation into corruption allegations against local officials in Virginia

Operation Big Coon Dog was an investigation by the United States Federal Bureau of Investigation (FBI) and the Internal Revenue Service (IRS) into alleged corruption surrounding the use of federal and state disaster recovery funds by public officials in Buchanan County, Virginia, United States, following severe flooding in the town of Hurley in May 2002. The investigation resulted in the criminal conviction of sixteen people, including several public officials and other government employees, on charges of bribery and fraud. It has been called the largest public corruption case in western Virginia in decades and a step towards uncovering a "dark culture of corruption in Buchanan County".

== Flood ==
On May 2, 2002, Buchanan County experienced heavy showers and thunderstorms throughout the day. In the town of Hurley, Virginia, 4.5 inches of rain fell during the course of a few hours, causing local streams and rivers to swell. Between 2:00pm and 3:30pm, Knox Creek, which ran through the town of Hurley, had overflowed its banks and submerged the town in up to twelve feet of water. Roads were washed out, and emergency personnel were not able to reach the town until 7:00pm that night. Two people were killed, and 98 families (the majority of the town's residents) were left without homes. In addition, 19 county bridges and 102 private bridges were destroyed, blocking access to 235 homes in the area.

Shortly after the flood, the Federal Emergency Management Agency (FEMA) and the Virginia Department of Emergency Management agreed to reimburse Buchanan County for up to $7.1 million for debris removal and other recovery efforts. Initial cleanup efforts were performed by Disaster Recovery Contractors, subcontracted by the U.S. Army Corps of Engineers. However, county officials objected to the use of external contractors and requested that local contractors be hired instead. FEMA approved the request and allowed the Buchanan County Board of Supervisors to select the contractors and oversee cleanup efforts starting in June 2002.

The recovery funds, which the county was given permission to award without competitive bidding, were awarded to local contractors and vendors who were later discovered to have paid approximately $545,000 worth of bribes in order to obtain these contracts. Some of the bribes accepted by county officials included all-terrain vehicles, NASCAR tickets, $40,000 worth of coon dogs, and $350,000 in cash.

== Trial and conviction ==
In June 2004, federal investigators arrested sixteen men on charges of bribery, fraud, and money laundering. The criminal trial began in June 2005 with Assistant U.S. Attorney Thomas Bondurant, Jr. as lead prosecutor. In July 2005, all sixteen men were convicted: six local government officials, nine businessmen, six companies, and one federal FEMA agent. All but one pleaded guilty.

=== Public officials and government employees ===
- Stuart Ray Blankenship, Knox District supervisor and former chairman of the Buchanan County Board of Supervisors, pleaded guilty to charges of racketeering and money laundering. Described as the "kingpin" of the bribery scheme, he was convicted of accepting bribes from local contractors and businessmen, including $240,000 in cash and, most notably, more than $40,000 worth of coon dogs. In the months leading up to charges being filed, he had raised suspicions among raccoon hunters when he "popped into the scene out of nowhere" and started winning competitions and advertising his dogs for sale or stud service in national magazines. Blankenship was sentenced to fourteen years in prison, the longest sentence of the sixteen men convicted.
- James Ralph "Pete" Stiltner, then chairman of the Buchanan County Board of Supervisors, was indicted on charges of racketeering, program fraud, money laundering, and perjury charges.
- Calvin Ward, former supervisor, was sentenced to three years.
- County emergency coordinator David Mathias Thompson, who accepted bribes from Kenneth Joseph Stephens in the form of cash and clothing, pleaded guilty to racketeering, program fraud, and money laundering.
- Kenneth Morris Hale, county road official, accepted $90,000 in bribes from Terry Clevinger and Kenneth Joseph Stephens. He pleaded guilty to charges of racketeering, conspiracy to launder money, and two counts of program fraud.
- Ricky Allen Adkins, county road inspector, was convicted of submitting falsified expense and time records to Blankenship, who allowed this in return for Adkins caring for Blankenship's coon dogs.
- FEMA agent Gary Moore was sentenced to six years in prison for accepting bribes and "turning a blind eye to the corruption".

=== Businessmen and contractors ===
The following businessmen and contractors were convicted of paying bribing public officials to receive contracts and rigging contract bids:

- Kenneth Joseph Stephens, owner of a lumber company who paid $300,000 in bribes and was awarded $2.2 million in contracts, served a two-year prison sentence for racketeering and money laundering.
- Earl Jackson Lester, the only man to plead innocence, was found guilty of conspiracy to commit wire fraud and to launder money. Lester, the owner of a construction company, was not accused of paying bribes, but rather rigging bids by deliberately placing high bids on contracts in order to steer the contracts for other contractors.
- Terry Allen Keene, owner of an excavation company, pleaded guilty to money laundering conspiracy and racketeering.
- Donald Ray Matney, owner of a local contracting company, also pleaded guilty to money laundering conspiracy and racketeering.
- Rodney Blake Lee, a contractor, pleaded guilty to racketeering, money laundering, and program fraud. He was accused of paying bribes to Blankenship to secure bridge repair contracts.

== Civil trial ==
After the corruption was discovered, federal and state government agencies refused to reimburse the county for the misused funds, resulting in a loss of $2.7 million for the county. In 2005, Buchanan County filed a civil suit to recover these funds.

In March 2006, U.S. Attorney John L. Brownlee provided the county with $1,050,544 that had been forfeited by the defendants named in the suit. The civil trial continued, and in June 2008, a federal jury awarded the county another $500,000 from two corporations named in the suit, Vansant Lumber Co. and KJ Stephens and Associates. However, this verdict was overturned by U.S. District Judge James P. Jones in October 2008.
