= Bearwallow, Virginia =

Unincorporated community in Virginia, United States

- Unincorporated community
- Location within Virginia Location within the United States
- Coordinates: 37°14′29″N 81°44′39″W
- Country: United States
- State: Virginia
- County: Buchanan
- Elevation: 3,048 ft (929 m)
- Time zone: UTC-5 (Eastern (EST))
  - Summer (DST): UTC-4 (EDT)
- GNIS feature ID: 1477101

Bearwallow is an unincorporated community in Buchanan County, Virginia, United States. Bearwallow is located in the extreme northeastern corner of the county on Virginia State Route 616, approximately 19.8 miles (31.9 km) east-southeast of Grundy. A short distance to the east of Bearwallow lies the intersection of Buchanan County with Tazewell County and McDowell County, West Virginia.

A post office was established as Bear Wallow in 1874 and remained in operation until being discontinued in 1951. The community is named after the use of the area by bears to wallow.
