= Ruth White =

Ruth White may refer to:

- Ruth White (actress) (1914–1969), American actress
- Ruth White (Baháʼí author) (born 1867), Baha'i and author of works relating to the Baha'i faith
- Ruth White (children's author) (1942–2017), American author of works relating to life in Virginia
- Ruth White (composer) (1925–2013), American composer known for electronic music
- Ruth White (fencer) (born 1951), American Olympic fencer
