= BCPS =

BCPS may refer to:

- Bangladesh College of Physicians and Surgeons, an institute of medical science in Bangladesh.
- Baltimore City Public Schools, a system of schools administered by the Baltimore City Government.
- Baltimore County Public Schools, a system of schools administered by the government of the Baltimore County, Maryland.
- Birth control pills (BCPs)
- Board Certified Pharmacotherapy Specialist, a pharmacist who has been granted certification by the Board of Pharmaceutical Specialities in the area of Pharmacotherapy.
- Botetourt County Public Schools, a system of schools administered by the government of the Botetourt County, Virginia.
- Broward County Public Schools, a system of schools administered by the government of the Broward County, Florida.
- Buchanan County Public Schools, a system of schools administered by the government of the Buchanan County, Virginia.
