= William Henry McFarland =

American politician (born 1890)

Member of the Virginia House of Delegates representing Buchanan and Dickenson counties
- In office 1956–1957

Personal details
- Born: 1890 Council, Virginia, U.S.
- Party: Democratic
- Occupation: Politician; businessman

William Henry McFarland (born 1890) was an American politician from Virginia.

== Biography ==
William Henry McFarland was born in 1890 in Council, Virginia. He attended a business course. Around 1940, McFarland moved to Haysi. He ran a shoe store. He served in World War I.

McFarland was a Democrat. He served as a member of the Virginia House of Delegates, representing Buchanan and Dickenson counties, from 1956 to 1957.
