= Twin Valley High School =

Twin Valley High School can refer to:

- Twin Valley High School (Pennsylvania), Elverson, Pennsylvania
- Twin Valley High School (Virginia), Pilgrim's Knob, Virginia
