= McGlothlin =

McGlothlin is a surname. It is an Anglicised form of the Gaelic MacLochlainn, meaning "son of Lochlann".

Notable people with the surname include:

- Jean McGlothlin Doerge (b. 1937), American politician
- Jim McGlothlin (1943–1975), American baseball player
- Jim and Woodrow McGlothlin, father and son who founded United Coal Company
- Michael McGlothlin (born 1951), American politician

== See also ==
- 10638 McGlothlin, main-belt asteroid
- Pat McGlothin (1920–2014), American baseball player
