= Humorology =

Nonprofit in Madison, Wisconsin, US

- Nickname: Humo
- Formation: 1947
- Legal status: Charity
- Purpose: Charitable fundraising
- Headquarters: 333 East Campus Mall Room 184
- Location: Madison, Wisconsin, United States
- Website: www.humorology.org

Humorology, Inc., also called Humo, is a Wisconsin nonprofit organization and an annual fraternity and sorority philanthropic event at the University of Wisconsin–Madison in Madison, Wisconsin. Annually, the nonprofit hosts a competition of original mini musical comedies written, produced, and performed by students and overseen by a student-run executive board. Begun in 1947, Humorology is one of the oldest traditions at the university.

== History ==
Founded in 1947, Humorology is annual fundraising event where University of Wisconsin–Madison fraternities and sororities present short musical comedy shows. Originally, the shows were sponsored by the Inter-Fraternity Council and the Pan-Hellenic Association and were akin to vaudeville acts, filled with slapstick, lampoons, and clowning. The winner of the first show in March 1947 was Sigma Nu which performed a minstrel show.

For its first twenty years, the event's main beneficiary was The Capital Times' Kiddie Camp for children with rheumatic fever. Humorology raised $1,909 in 1951 and $2,050 in 1952 for the camp. By 1963, the Humorology had given more than $16,400 to Kiddie Camp. Next, the event raised money for international student scholarships.

Humorology ceased to exist after 1970 due to a lack of interest. After a hiatus, it was revived in 1979, and again supported Kiddie Camp. Now, Humorology supports a different local charity each year. Between 1947 and 2023, it raised $1.5 million for various groups.

One of the University of Wisconsin–Madison's oldest traditions, Humorology or Humo overseen by a ten-member student executive board. Humorology incorporated as a nonprofit organization in 1993 and is Wisconsin's largest student-led nonprofit organization. Its mission is "to promote community engagement and philanthropic service through creativity and dedication".

== Performance ==
The Humorology show consists of six original twenty-minute shows that adapt popular music and into a story with singing, dancing, and comedy. Students write, direct, choreograph, and perform the show; student also make the sets and costumes. Each Humorology company consists of members of a University of Wisconsin–Madison fraternity teamed with members of a sorority. Individuals who are not part of the Greek system can also participate. Around 1,000 students and 28 fraternities and sororities participate in the philanthropic event annually.

All fraternities and sororities are eligible to audition in November for Humorology, but only six acts make it to the final performance in April. The six mini-musical comedies are performed over a series of three nights. On the final night, a panel of judges presents selects the top three acts. The winner is the act what has raised the most money.

== Philanthropy ==
Proceeds from Humorology are donated to local children's charities, with a different charity being selected each year. The event has raised more than $2.4 million from its founding in 1947 through 2023.

Some recent beneficiaries of the Humorology include:

- Badger Childhood Cancer Network $405,000
- Blessings In A Backpack $341,000
- Big Brothers Big Sisters of Dane County $145,000
- Boys and Girls Club of Dane County and the Dane County chapter of United Cerebral Palsy $185,000
- Canopy Center of Dane County $508,000
- Logan's Hearts and Smiles $490,000
- Neighborhood House $234,500
- Respite Center at RISE Wisconsin $441,000
- The Rainbow Project $195,000

== Show winners ==
Year	1st place	2nd place	3rd place
1947	Sigma Nu	Kappa Kappa Gamma	Delta Delta Delta and Theta Delta Chi
2001	Pi Beta Phi and Sigma Phi Epsilon	Delta Gamma and Acacia	Chi Omega and Tau Kappa Epsilon
2002	Kappa Kappa Gamma and Acacia	Delta Gamma and Sigma Alpha Epsilon	Gamma Phi Beta and Sigma Phi Epsilon
2003	Delta Gamma and Sigma Phi Epsilon	Gamma Phi Beta and Acacia	Alpha Phi, Zeta Beta Tau, and Sigma Phi
2004	Delta Gamma and Delta Upsilon	Kappa Kappa Gamma and Sigma Phi Epsilon	Alpha Chi Omega and Acacia
2005	Pi Beta Phi and Sigma Phi Epsilon	Alpha Chi Omega, Sigma Phi, and Sigma Pi	Delta Gamma and Pi Kappa Alpha
2006	Delta Gamma, Sigma Pi, and Sigma Phi	Kappa Alpha Theta and Chi Psi	Alpha Chi Omega and Sigma Phi Epsilon
2007	Alpha Chi Omega, Delta Tau Delta, Alpha Gamma Rho, and Alpha Epsilon Pi	Delta Gamma and Sigma Phi Epsilon	Kappa Kappa Gamma, Chi Psi, and Sigma Chi
2008	Gamma Phi Beta, Delta Tau Delta, Alpha Gamma Rho, and Alpha Epsilon Pi	Delta Gamma and Delta Upsilon	Kappa Alpha Theta, Sigma Phi, and Sigma Pi
2009	Delta Gamma, Delta Tau Delta, Alpha Gamma Rho, and Alpha Epsilon Pi	Gamma Phi Beta and Sigma Phi Epsilon	Kappa Alpha Theta and Phi Gamma Delta
2010	Alpha Chi Omega and Sigma Phi Epsilon	Kappa Kappa Gamma and Alpha Epsilon Pi	Pi Beta Phi, Phi Gamma Delta, and Phi Kappa Tau
2011	Delta Gamma and Sigma Phi Epsilon	Kappa Kappa Gamma, Alpha Gamma Rho, Chi Psi, and Delta Tau Delta	Alpha Chi Omega and Alpha Epsilon Pi
2012	Gamma Phi Beta, Alpha Gamma Rho, Delta Tau Delta, and Chi Psi	Kappa Kappa Gamma and Sigma Phi Epsilon	Delta Gamma, Delta Upsilon, and Kappa Sigma
2013	Alpha Phi and Phi Gamma Delta	Chi Omega, Alpha Epsilon Phi, Alpha Gamma Rho, Delta Tau Delta, and Chi Psi	Pi Beta Phi, Theta Chi, and Chi Phi
2014	Pi Beta Phi and Sigma Phi Epsilon	Kappa Alpha Theta and Chi Phi	Kappa Kappa Gamma and Phi Gamma Delta
2015	Delta Gamma and Friends	Alpha Epsilon Phi, Pi Kappa Alpha, and Psi Upsilon	Kappa Kappa Gamma, Alpha Gamma Rho, Delta Tau Delta, and Chi Psi
2016	Pi Beta Phi, Pi Kappa Alpha, and Psi Upsilon	Alpha Epsilon Phi and Friends	Kappa Alpha Theta, Zeta Beta Tau, and Delta Chi
2017	Kappa Alpha Theta, Delta Tau Delta, and Chi Psi	Delta Gamma and Zeta Beta Tau	Pi Beta Phi, Theta Chi, and Sigma Phi
2018	Alpha Epsilon Phi, Delta Tau Delta, and Chi Psi	Alpha Chi Omega, Kappa Kappa Gamma, and Phi Gamma Delta	Kappa Alpha Theta
2019	Alpha Epsilon Phi, Zeta Beta Tau, and Delta Chi	Alpha Chi Omega, Kappa Kappa Gamma, Acacia, and Beta Theta Pi	Alpha Phi, Delta Delta Delta, and Sigma Chi
2021	Gamma Phi Beta, Beta Theta Pi		
2022	Kappa Alpha Theta, Chi Psi, and Acacia	Alpha Phi and Phi Gamma Delta	Alpha Xi Delta, Zeta Beta Tau, and Delta Chi
2023	Gamma Phi Beta, Delta Gamma, and Phi Gamma Delta	Phi Delta Theta, Pi Beta Phi, and Sigma Phi	Alpha Sigma Phi, Kappa Alpha Theta, and Tau Kappa Epsilon
2024	Pi Beta Phi, and Pi Kappa Alpha	Beta Theta Pi, Delta Gamma, and Gamma Phi Beta	Alpha Xi Delta and Phi Delta Theta
2025	Alpha Chi Omega, Kappa Kappa Gamma and Phi Gamma Delta	Delta Tau Delta and Pi Beta Phi	Alpha Xi Delta, Delta Chi, Theta Delta Chi, and Alpha Sigma Phi
2026	Alpha Xi Delta, Chi Omega, Delta Tau Delta, and Sigma Pi	Alpha Chi Omega, Tau Kappa Epsilon, and Delta Chi	Gamma Phi Beta, Chi Psi, and Theta Delta Chi

== Notable people ==
Television producer, director, and screenwriter Steven Levitan started his career in comedy working on shows for Humorology. Michael Begler and Jack Amiel met when working on Humorology and are now a screenwriting team for television.
