= Poplar Gap Park =

Park in Virginia

Coordinates: 37.242335°N 82.159204°W

Poplar Gap Park is a county maintained park in Buchanan County, Virginia. The park is located equidistant from Grundy, Virginia and Prater, Virginia. The park sits at the top of a former strip mining site and was opened in 2001. The park contains a football field, two baseball/softball fields, picnic shelters, and a playground. The park is the site of Buchanan County Festival, held every July.

The park's elevation is 2061 feet above sea level.

== Gallery ==
The baseball/softball fields at Poplar Gap Park

The soccer/football field at Poplar Gap Park
