= Council High School =

Council High School may refer to:

- Council High School (Idaho)
- Council High School (Virginia)
