= Maxie, Virginia =

Unincorporated community in Virginia, United States

- Unincorporated community
- Location within Virginia Location within the United States
- Coordinates: 37°18′04″N 82°10′27″W
- Country: United States
- State: Virginia
- County: Buchanan
- Elevation: 1,066 ft (325 m)
- Time zone: UTC-5 (Eastern (EST))
  - Summer (DST): UTC-4 (EDT)
- Area code: 276
- GNIS feature ID: 1495912

Maxie is an unincorporated community in Buchanan County, in the U.S. state of Virginia.

The Maxie post office was established in 1914.
