= Harman, Virginia =

Unincorporated community in Virginia, United States

- Unincorporated community
- Location within Virginia Location within the United States
- Coordinates: 37°17′35″N 82°12′07″W
- Country: United States
- State: Virginia
- County: Buchanan
- Elevation: 1,220 ft (370 m)
- Time zone: UTC-5 (Eastern (EST))
  - Summer (DST): UTC-4 (EDT)
- Area code: 276
- GNIS feature ID: 1495655

Harman is an unincorporated community in Buchanan County, in the U.S. state of Virginia.

The Harman post office was established in 1935. It was named for the Harman family who owned the local coal mine.
