= Lance E. Nichols =

American actor

- Born: July 13, 1955 (age 70); New Orleans, Louisiana
- Occupation: Actor

Lance E. Nichols (born July 13, 1955) is an American actor best known for playing dentist Larry Williams on Treme.

== Early life and education ==
A native of New Orleans, Louisiana, Nichols graduated from McDonogh 35 College Preparatory Charter High School and the University of New Orleans.

== Career ==
Nichols is also known for his roles in The Curious Case of Benjamin Button and House of Cards and is a frequent presence in films that were made in the city. In 2012 he appeared as a character similar to his Treme character, and also named "Larry", in a commercial for Chase Bank that also featured Drew Brees and his family and was aired during the broadcast of Super Bowl XLVI. From 2015 to 2019, he's starred in the martial arts drama series Into the Badlands, as a supporting character named The River King.

== Filmography ==
=== Film ===
Year	Title	Role	Notes
1987	Project X	Hamer	
1987	Cold Steel	Other Cop	
1990	Side Out	Taxi Driver	
1991	Convicts	Sherman Edwards	
1995	Serial Killer	Doctor	
1998	Snake Eyes	Cop #3	
2001	K-PAX	David Patel	
2001	Frailty	FBI Agent #4	
2003	Runaway Jury	Agent Shield	
2008	A Good Man Is Hard to Find	Deacon Smith	
2008	American Violet	Mr. Moss	
2008	The Curious Case of Benjamin Button	Preacher	
2009	I Love You Phillip Morris	Houston Judge	
2009	Night of the Demons	Seargent Dawson	
2009	Bad Lieutenant: Port of Call New Orleans	Jeremiah Goodhusband	
2009	Hurricane Season	Pastor	
2010	Welcome to the Rileys	Hamilton "Ham" Watkins	
2010	The Last Song	Pastor Harris	
2010	The Chameleon	FBI Doctor	
2010	Mirrors 2	Detective Huston	
2010	Knucklehead	Milton's Dad	
2010	The Jack of Spades	Fred, The Jeweler	
2011	The Mechanic	Henry	
2011	Where I Begin	Patrick	
2011	The Mortician	Augie, The Shopkeeper	
2011	Never Back Down 2: The Beatdown	Official Agent	
2011	Flood Streets	Cedric	
2011	Dark Blue	Lieutenant Harris	
2011	Green Lantern	Cop	
2011	Brawler	Lieutenant McSweeney	
2011	Inside Out	Taxman #3	
2011	Creature	Old Man	
2011	Jeff, Who Lives at Home	Elderly Man / Phone (O.S.)	
2011	October Baby	Dr. Stewart	
2011	Storm War	Senator Aldrich	
2011	Snatched	Spud	
2012	Contraband	CBP Agent	
2012	Another Dirty Movie	Buck	
2012	Stash House	Priest	
2012	Fish Story: The Curse of Mocatawbi Pond	Wormy Angler	
2012	Hell and Mr. Fudge	Arnold	
2012	The Campaign	Denning Mayor	Uncredited
2013	Straight A's	Dr. Carr	
2013	Beautiful Creatures	Mayor Snow	
2013	The Haunting in Connecticut 2: Ghosts of Georgia	Pastor Wells	
2013	Samuel Bleak	Lester	
2013	Susie's Hope	Judge Randolph	
2013	Fractured	Dr. Edwards	
2013	Homefront	Senior DEA Agent Ronnie	
2014	Elsa & Fred	Maitre D'	
2014	13 Sins	Police Captain	
2014	Moms' Night Out	Ronald	
2014	American Heist	Auto Shop Boss	
2014	The Town That Dreaded Sundown	Arkansas Mayor Holdridge	
2014	Left Behind	Pastor Bruce Barnes	
2015	A Sort of Homecoming	Hal	
2015	The Livingston Gardener	Warden Bishop Wells	
2015	June	Dr. Wynstrom	
2015	I Am Potential	Charles	
2015	Fantastic Four	DC Senior Official (Area 57)	
2015	Shark Lake	Sheriff Lewis Galloway	
2015	Navy Seals vs. Zombies	Senator Abrams	
2015	Woodlawn	Junior	
2015	Heist	Captain Michaels	
2016	Here Comes Rusty	Keith	
2016	Before I Wake	Detective	
2016	Race to Win	Dr. Sanders	
2016	The Perfect Weapon	Politician	
2016	Believe	Mayor Harris	
2017	Camera Obscura	Lieutenant Vincent	
2017	County Line	"Doc" Bronson	
2018	Assassination Nation	FBI Agent Richard Vernon	
2018	Black Water	Buchanan	
2018	The Domestics	Winston	
2018	All Styles	Yonas	
2018	Mara	McCarthy	
2019	Bayou Tales	Hammel	
2019	Above Suspicion	Agent Baumgarten	
2019	Christmas on the Range	Gus	
2019	Semper Fi	Balfour	
2020	Body Cam	Pastor Thomas Jackson	
2021	Palmer	Sibs	
2021	Heart of Champions	President Harris	
2021	Dark Well	FBI Agent Rogers	
2022	The Contrast	Mr. Van Rough	
2022	Bruh-Bruh	Pastor Jeremiah McKnight	
2023	American Outlaws	Willy Spencer	
2023	The Burial	Judge Graves	
2024	Unsung Hero	Art Meriweather	

=== Television ===
Year	Title	Role	Notes
1983	Gimme a Break!	Vampire	Episode: "The Return of the Doo-Wop Girls"
1985	The Twilight Zone	Cabbie	Episode: "Dead Woman's Shoes"
1986	Amazing Stories	Guard #2	Episode: "You Gotta Believe Me"
1987	Cheers	Bailiff	Episode: "Chambers vs. Malone"
1988	L.A. Law	Clerk	Episode: "Belle of the Bald"
1989	Full Exposure: The Sex Tapes Scandal	Hollis Strother	Television film
1989	The Hogan Family	Orderly	Episode: "Slapshot"
1990	Alien Nation	Delivery Man	Episode: "Gimme, Gimme"
1990	Murder, She Wrote	Policeman	Episode: "Trials and Tribulations"
1990	The Great Los Angeles Earthquake	Paramedic	Television film
1990	Gabriel's Fire	Sergeant Glad	Episode: "The Wind Rancher"
1992	Matlock	Reporter / Stu	2 episodes
1992, 1994	Renegade	Security Guard / Deputy	2 episodes
1993	Tainted Blood	Social Worker	Television film
1994	Accidental Meeting	Ad Agency Guy	Television film
1994	Sisters	Officer Sadowski	Episode: "Paradise Lost"
1995	As Good as Dead	Police Officer	Television film
1995	Martin	Pa Duke	Episode: "Cole on Ice"
1995	The Fresh Prince of Bel-Air	Producer	Episode: "There's the Rub: Part 2"
1995	Step by Step	Mr. Dickens	Episode: "The Fight Before Christmas"
1996	Picket Fences	Protester #2	Episode: "Dante's Inferno"
1996	3rd Rock from the Sun	Security Salesman	Episode: "Assault with a Deadly Dick"
1996	Minor Adjustments	Mr. Chase	Episode: "A Christmas Story"
1996	Diagnosis: Murder	Car Jacker	2 episodes
1996	NewsRadio	George	Episode: "Daydream"
1997	Home Invasion	Dr. Royce	Television film
1997	Tracey Takes On...	Manager	Episode: "Mothers"
1997	Everybody Loves Raymond	Mack	Episode: "Neighbors"
1997	A Match Made in Heaven	Mort Paulson	Television film
1997	Mad About You	Dr. Eckstein	2 episodes
1997	The Jamie Foxx Show	Lamonte Lassacier	Episode: "Do the Write Thing"
1997	Nick Freno: Licensed Teacher	Mr. Morrison	Episode: "Dr. Love"
1997	The Steve Harvey Show	Man In Chicken Suit	Episode: "I'm Not a Chauvinist, Piggy"
1997	Smart Guy	Larry	Episode: "T.J. versus the Machine"
1998	Last Rites	FBI Agent #2	Television film
1998, 2000	NYPD Blue	Bus Driver / Coley	2 episodes
1999	Any Day Now	Man	Episode: "A Parent's Job"
1999, 2000	Beyond Belief: Fact or Fiction	Officer Shields	2 episodes
2000	100 Deeds for Eddie McDowd	Mark	Episode: "False Hero"
2000	The Practice	Evidence Room Officer	Episode: "Death Penalties"
2000	Something to Sing About	Councilman	Television film
2000	How to Marry a Billionaire: A Christmas Tale	Principal Jones	Television film
2001	18 Wheels of Justice	Doctor	Episode: "The Game"
2001	The Drew Carey Show	Warren	Episode: "Eat Drink Drew Woman"
2002	The Invisible Man	The Mayor	Episode: "Mere Mortals"
2002	Touched by an Angel	Minister Russell	Episode: "Ship-in-a-Bottle"
2002	Firestarter: Rekindled	Medical Examiner	2 episodes
2002	The Shield	Gene	Episode: "Pay in Pain"
2002	The Parkers	Guy #1	Episode: "The Dates from Hell"
2003	Buffy the Vampire Slayer	Middle-Aged Man	Episode: "Touched"
2003	The West Wing	Jay	Episode: "Twenty Five"
2004	The Brooke Ellison Story	Play Off Official	Television film
2005	Oil Storm	Frank Milner	Television film
2005	Half & Half	Guard	Episode: "The Big How to Do & Undo It Episode"
2005	Snow Wonder	Boudreaux	Television film
2005	Desperate Housewives	Minister	Episode: "The Sun Won't Set"
2005	Charmed	Joe	Episode: "Hulkus Pocus"
2006	In Justice	Wise Man #1	Episode: "Cost of Freedom"
2006	ER	Detective Barnes	2 episodes
2006	The Loop	Air Marshall #1	Episode: "Jack Air"
2006	Standoff	Henry Bremner	Episode: "Heroine"
2007	Girl, Positive	Dr. Crane	Television film
2007	Big Shots	Boardmember #2	Episode: "Pilot"
2008	Racing for Time	Keith Simons	Television film
2008	Living Proof	Dr. Brown	Television film
2010	The Wronged Man	Judge Pifer	Television film
2010–2013	Treme	Larry Williams	29 episodes
2011	Swamp Shark	Simon	Television film
2011	Memphis Beat	Hank Miller	Episode: "Lost"
2011	Hound Dogs	Big Club G.M.	Television film
2013	American Horror Story: Coven	Detective Sanchez	Episode: "Boy Parts"
2013, 2016	House of Cards	Gene Clancy	2 episodes
2015	NCIS: New Orleans	Detective Mack Garrity	Episode: "The List"
2015–2018	Into the Badlands	River King	4 episodes
2016	Arceneaux: Melpomene's Song	Lonnie Arceneaux	Television film
2017	Shepherd	Father Joseph	Television film
2017	Family of Lies	Detective Whitaker	Television film
2017, 2019	The Chosen	Sol	2 episodes
2018	The Purge	Otis	Episode: "Take What's Yours"
2018	BFA New Orleans	Dean Benjamin Morgan	Television film
2019–2021	Queen of the South	Lucien	4 episodes
2020	First Christmas	Eugene	Television film
2021	Maternally Yours	Joseph Roberts	Television film
