= Believe (2016 film) =

2016 film directed by Billy Dickson

- Theatrical release poster
- Directed by: Billy Dickson
- Written by: Billy Dickson
- Produced by: Nelson Diaz; Ben Holmes; Jacob Patrick; Kevin Sizemore
- Starring: Ryan O'Quinn; Issac Ryan Brown; Danielle Nicolet; Shawnee Smith; Lance E. Nichols
- Cinematography: Billy Dickson
- Edited by: Noah Pontell
- Music by: Michael Reola
- Production companies: Believe the Film; Power of 3
- Distributed by: Freestyle Releasing; Smith Global Media
- Release date: December 2, 2016 (United States)
- Running time: 119 minutes
- Country: United States
- Language: English
- Budget: $3.5 million
- Box office: $890,303

Believe is a 2016 American Christmas drama film directed and written by Billy Dickson. The film stars Ryan O'Quinn, Issac Ryan Brown, Danielle Nicolet, Shawnee Smith, and Lance E. Nichols. It was released theatrically by Freestyle Releasing and Smith Global Media on December 2, 2016.

== Plot ==
In a small town facing tough economic times, business owner Matthew Peyton (Ryan O'Quinn) struggles between his desire for financial success and the responsibility of funding the annual Christmas pageant. Desperate business decisions ruin his popularity amongst his employees. Angered, employees seek their revenge on him. When Matthew meets Clarence (Issac Ryan Brown), a joyful boy who believes in miracles, he must make a choice: to do what is best for himself or to give faith a chance by opening his heart to help his community.

== Cast ==
- Ryan O'Quinn as Matthew Peyton
- Issac Ryan Brown as Clarence Joseph
- Shawnee Smith as Dr. Nancy Wells
- Danielle Nicolet as Sharon Joseph
- Kevin Sizemore as Albert Bagley
- David DeLuise as Tom Blackhorn
- Lance E. Nichols as Mayor Harris
- James C. Burns as Bob Alexander
- Scott Summitt as Charlie
- Joey Naber as Nick
- Bryce Lenon as Sam

== Release ==
Believe was released in the United States on December 2, 2016 and was expected to gross less than $1 million from 638 theaters in its opening weekend. It made $477,387 in its opening weekend.

== Reception ==
On review aggregator website Rotten Tomatoes, the film has an approval rating of 33%, based on six reviews, with an average rating of 5.4/10. The film received the Gold Award for Best Film of the Year in 2016 from The Christian Film Review.

== See also ==
- List of Christmas films
