= Leemaster, Virginia =

Unincorporated community in Virginia, United States

Coordinates: 37°11′12″N 82°07′50″W

Leemaster is an unincorporated community in Buchanan County, Virginia, United States.

== History ==
A post office was established at Leemaster in 1905, and remained in operation until it was discontinued in 1972. Leemaster is a name honoring a local resident.
