= Stacy, Virginia =

Unincorporated community in Virginia, United States

- Unincorporated community
- Location within Virginia Location within the United States
- Coordinates: 37°19′15″N 81°59′46″W
- Country: United States
- State: Virginia
- County: Buchanan
- Elevation: 1,401 ft (427 m)
- Time zone: UTC−5 (Eastern (EST))
  - Summer (DST): UTC−4 (EDT)
- Area code: 276
- GNIS feature ID: 1497162

Stacy is an unincorporated community in Buchanan County, in the U.S. state of Virginia.

A post office was established at Stacy in 1892, and remained in operation until it was discontinued in 1961. The community was likely named for Benjamin Stacy, a settler.
