= Michael McGlothlin =

Commonwealths Attorney for Buchanan County, Virginia
- In office 1979–1983

Personal details
- Born: October 31st, 1951 Richlands, Virginia
- Party: Democratic

Michael G. "Mickey" McGlothlin is an Appalachian public figure from Southwest Virginia. He began his career in public service when he was elected as Commonwealth's Attorney of Buchanan County, Virginia in 1979. Not seeking a second term, he co-founded the McGlothlin & Wife Law Firm in his hometown of Grundy. Throughout the 1980s and 1990s he participated in numerous political, civic, and educational boards around Southwest Virginia and the state of Virginia. He heavily advocated for the establishment of the Appalachian School of Law and the Appalachian College of Pharmacy. Since its creation, he has served on the Board of Visitors for both schools and has also served as President of the Appalachian College of Pharmacy since 2009.

McGlothlin served as the lead prosecutor in the 1981–82 trial of Roger Keith Coleman, which resulted in the conviction and execution of Coleman for first-degree murder.

On June 12, 2007, McGlothlin lost a bid for the Democratic Party nomination for the 3rd District seat in the Virginia House of Delegates.
