= Big Rock, Virginia =

Unincorporated community in Virginia, United States

Big Rock
- census-designated place
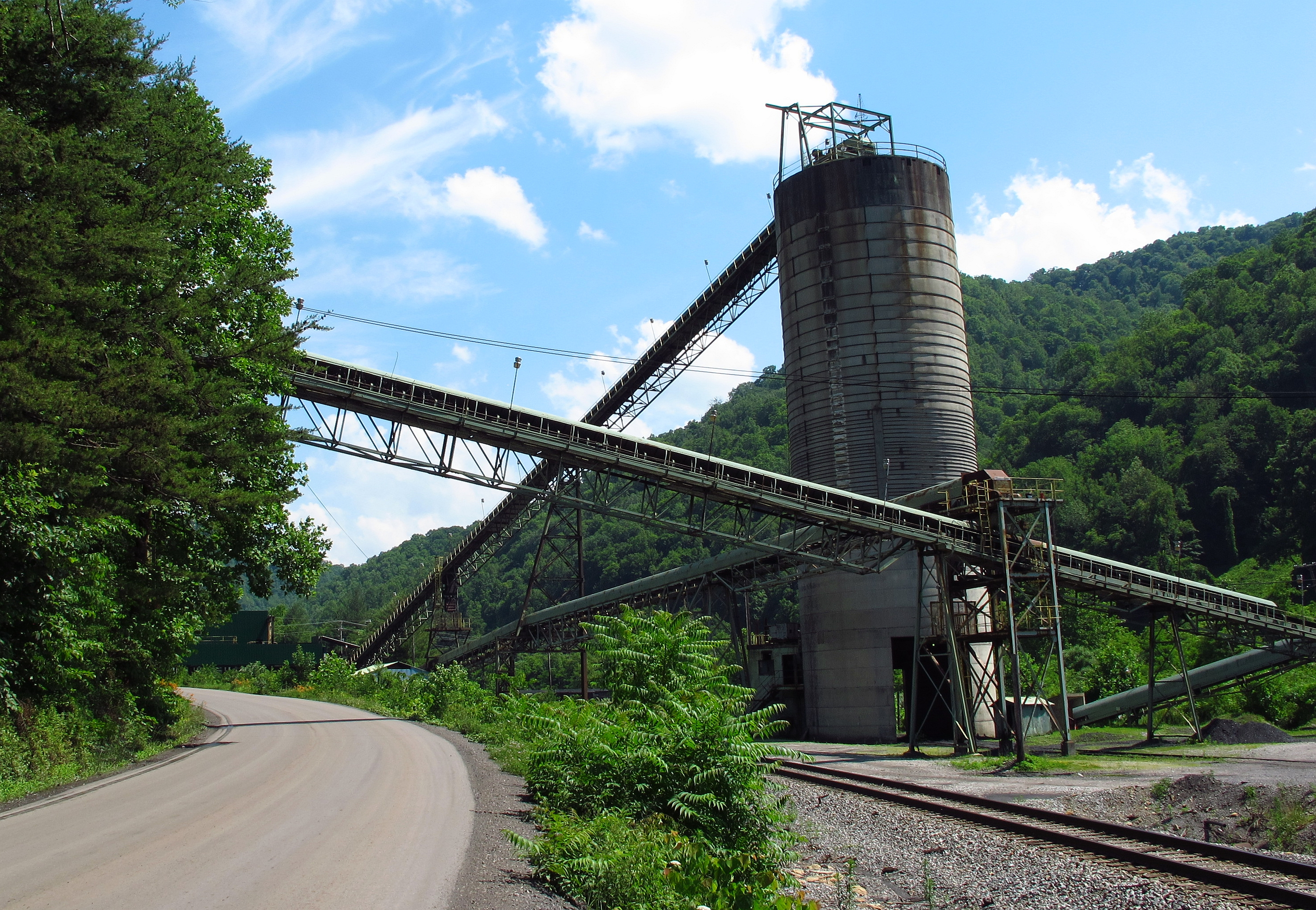
- Coal tipple in Big Rock

- Location within the Commonwealth of Virginia Big Rock (the United States)
- Coordinates: 37°21′11″N 82°11′20″W
- Country: United States
- State: Virginia
- County: Buchanan

Area
  - Total: 0.49 sq mi (1.27 km^{2})

Population (2020)
  - Total: 199
  - Density: 406/sq mi (157/km^{2})
- Time zone: UTC−5 (Eastern (EST))
  - Summer (DST): UTC−4 (EDT)
- GNIS feature ID: 1495268

Big Rock is an unincorporated community and census-designated place (CDP) in Buchanan County, Virginia, United States, located at the convergence of County Route 650 and U.S. Route 460, a short distance from the Kentucky state line. It was first listed as a CDP in the 2020 census with a population of 199.

A post office was established at Big Rock in 1854. The boulder from which the community likely took its name was destroyed in the 1930s by the building of the railroad.

== Demographics ==
Big Rock first appeared as a census designated place in the 2020 U.S. census.
