= The Health Wagon =

St. Mary's Health Wagon
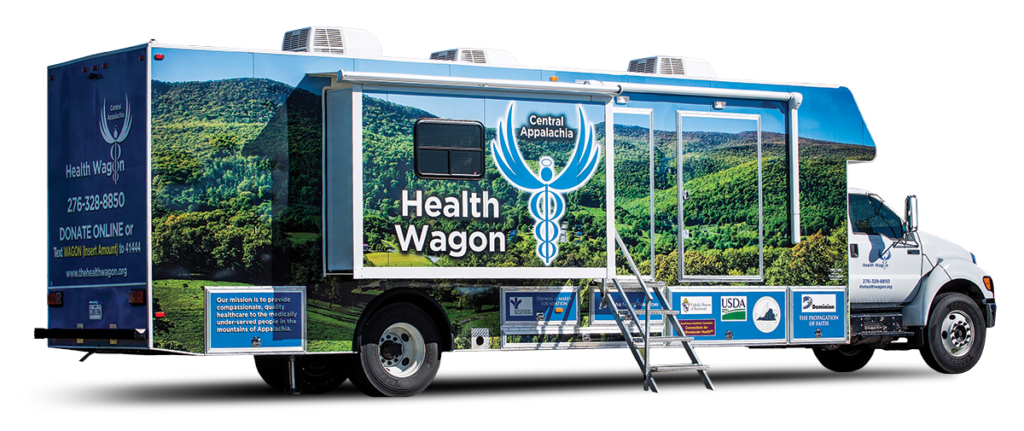
- Successor: Teresa Tyson, DNP
- Founder: Sister Bernadette Kenny
- Type: Nonprofit Free Clinic
- Location(s): Smiddy Clinic 5626 Patriot Drive Wise, Virginia 24293
- Coordinates: 36.96865°N 82.54880°W
- Region served: Southwest Virginia
- Revenue: $9.21 million
- Website: https://thehealthwagon.org/

The Health Wagon, which may also be referred to as St. Mary's Health Wagon, is a nonprofit organization providing free health care to those in the Appalachian Mountains of southwest Virginia. Since 1980, it has been operated by a small team of nurses who provide services to residents in six neighboring counties. Services are distributed in any of their three mobile units or two stationary clinics servicing Virginia's Buchanan, Dickenson, Russell, Lee, Scott, and Wise counties (and the city of Norton).

== History ==
In 1980, with the aid of St. Mary's Hospital of Norton, Sister Bernadette Kenny was able to cover the initial costs to distribute medication out of the back of her Volkswagen Beetle. Over the next three decades, the Health Wagon has acquired four mobile van units and established two stationary clinics.

Presently, the clinic is a $9.21 million nonprofit. In 2024, the high salaries of Health Wagon executives were questioned by local media.

== Clinic Structure ==
The clinic staff structure consists of doctors of nursing practitioners, family nurse practitioners, a dentist, registered nurses, licensed practical nurses, an outreach coordinator, a director of operations, an administrative assistant, a director of development, a IT director, and receptionists. They have grown to include full-time dental staff, pharmacy staff, and more.

== Funding and partnerships ==
Although St. Mary's Hospital was the Health Wagon's initial source for funding, financial support is primarily contracted through grant work, foundations and private contributions. Of these numerous funding opportunities, a Federal Office of Rural Health Policy grant supported the clinic from 2009 to 2012. The federal funds allowed the clinic to supplement salaries, improve community education resources, and the inclusion of an electronical medical records system. Through multiple established partnerships with organizations and universities, the Health Wagon has been able to offer services, not locally available. Partnering with the University of Virginia, a telemedicine connection was made possible through the Mid-Atlantic Telehealth Resource Center. Since 2004, it has enabled the Health Wagon to offer secondary and tertiary services. The AstraZeneca Healthcare Foundation has been a repeat supporter of the Health Wagon, funding various programs pertaining to cardiovascular disease initiatives.

The first ever FAA-approved Flirtey delivery drone made its debut pharmaceutical drop in 2015 at the Wise County Fairgrounds during the largest free medical outreach in the nation, M7 Move Mountains Medical Mission (Formally Wise RAM). It now is kept at the Smithsonian.

Appalachian Regional Commission is currently funding half a million dollars for the construction of a 5,000 square foot clinic in Dickenson County.
