= Janey, Virginia =

Unincorporated community in Virginia, United States

Janey
- Unincorporated community
- Location within Virginia Location within the United States
- Coordinates: 37°13′19″N 82°01′49″W
- Country: United States
- State: Virginia
- County: Buchanan

Janey is an unincorporated community in Buchanan County, Virginia, United States.

== History ==
A post office was established as Janey in 1950, and closed in 1958. It was named for Janey Owens, the postmaster's daughter.
