= Heath Calhoun =

American alpine skier (born 1979)

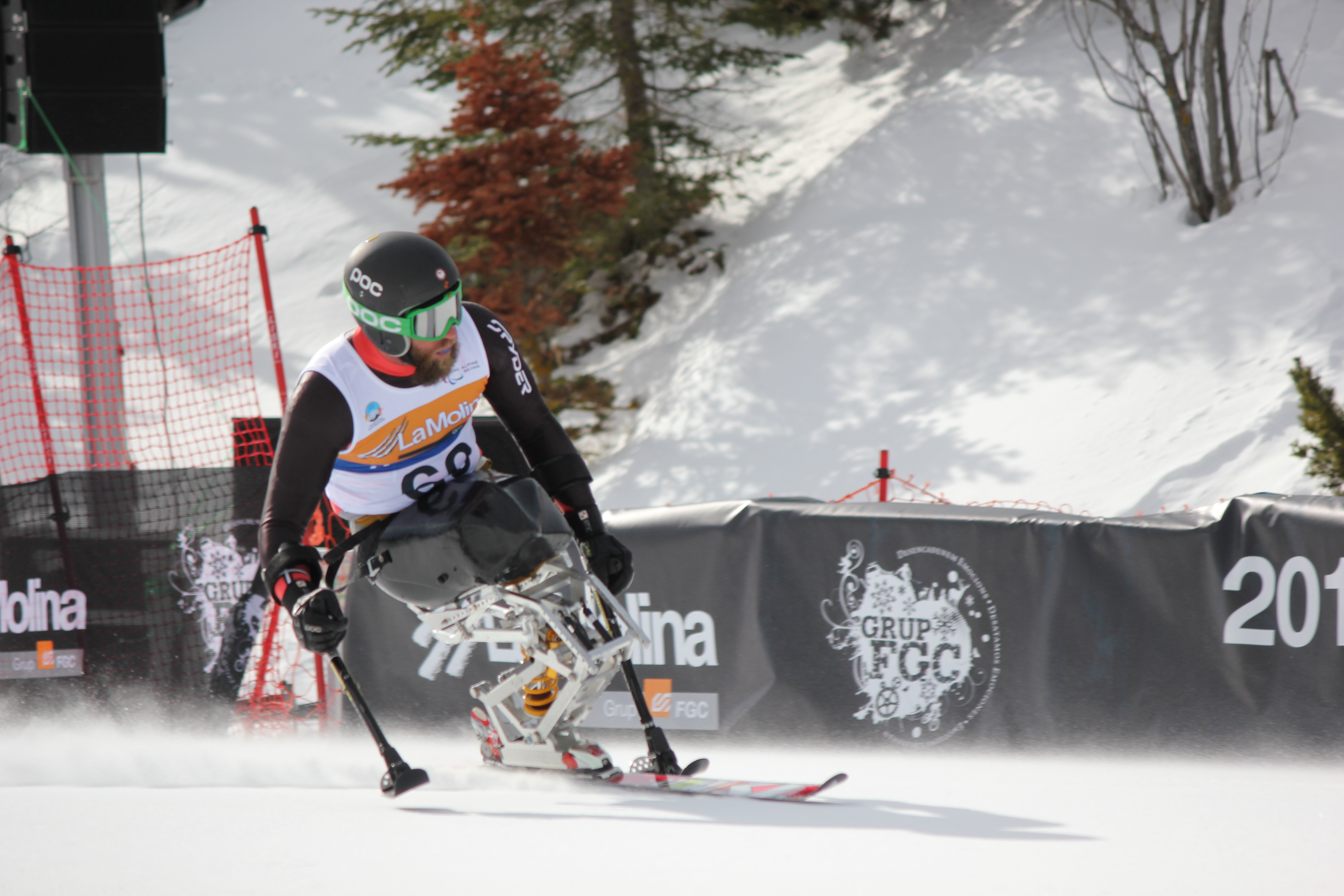
- Calhoun in 2013

Personal information
- Nationality: American
- Born: June 29, 1979 (age 46) Bristol, Tennessee, U.S.

Sport
- Country: United States
- Sport: Alpine skiing

Heath Calhoun (born June 29, 1979) is an American alpine skier and veteran of the United States Army, who achieved the rank of staff sergeant. A double-leg amputee due to injuries received in the Iraq War, Calhoun uses a sit-ski in competitions.

Born in Bristol, Tennessee, Calhoun, a native of Grundy, Virginia, graduated from Grundy Senior High School in 1997. After earning an associate's degree from Southwest Virginia Community College in 1999, he joined the U.S. Army, as his father and grandfather had done.

Upon his enlistment, he was sent to Fort Benning, Georgia, where he completed infantry, airborne, and Ranger training. He was sent to serve in Iraq as a squad leader in the 101st Airborne Division. While riding in a convoy, his Humvee was struck by a rocket-propelled grenade. The explosion killed one soldier and severely damaged Calhoun's legs, necessitating the amputation of both limbs above the knee. He spent the next nine months recuperating at Walter Reed Army Medical Center.

Five months after his injury, Calhoun tried skiing for the first time at a sports clinic in Aspen, Colorado. In 2008, he moved to Aspen to begin training seriously for international alpine skiing competitions. At the 2009 U.S. Adaptive Alpine National Championships, he took second place in the sit-ski slalom and first in the sit-ski super G. He was selected for the U.S. alpine skiing team at the 2010 Winter Paralympics in Vancouver, British Columbia, Canada.

Calhoun is a spokesperson for the Wounded Warrior Project and for Hanger Prosthetics and Orthotics. He is also involved with the Amputee Coalition of America as a peer counselor. Calhoun, who lives in Clarksville, Tennessee, has three children; a son and two daughters.

The 2010 NASCAR spring race at Richmond International Raceway has been named the "Heath Calhoun 400" in his honor, following a contest in which fans were asked to nominate and vote for military members who had performed a "selfless act".
