= Shack Mills, Virginia =

Unincorporated community in Virginia, United States

Coordinates: 37°11′40″N 81°57′13″W

Shack Mills is an unincorporated community in Buchanan County, Virginia, United States.

== History ==
A post office called Shack's Mills was open from 1871 until 1874. A mill started by Mcshack Ratliff caused the name to be selected.
