= Harman Junction, Virginia =

Unincorporated community in Virginia, United States

- Unincorporated community
- Location within Virginia Location within the United States
- Coordinates: 37°18′36″N 82°09′44″W
- Country: United States
- State: Virginia
- County: Buchanan
- Elevation: 961 ft (293 m)
- Time zone: UTC-5 (Eastern (EST))
  - Summer (DST): UTC-4 (EDT)
- Area code: 276
- GNIS feature ID: 1495656

Harman Junction is an unincorporated community in Buchanan County, in the U.S. state of Virginia.
