= Mavisdale, Virginia =

Unincorporated community in Virginia, United States

- Unincorporated community
- Location within Virginia Location within the United States
- Coordinates: 37°11′54″N 82°00′28″W
- Country: United States
- State: Virginia
- County: Buchanan
- Elevation: 1,365 ft (416 m)
- Time zone: UTC-5 (Eastern (EST))
  - Summer (DST): UTC-4 (EDT)
- ZIP code: 24627
- Area code: 276
- GNIS feature ID: 1499716

Mavisdale is an unincorporated community in Buchanan County, Virginia, United States. Mavisdale is located on State Route 624, 7.5 miles (12.1 km) southeast of Grundy. Mavisdale has a post office with ZIP code 24627.

== History ==
Mavisdale may have been first known as Maize Dale, meaning "corn valley". The post office at Mavisdale was established in 1938.
