= Ryan O'Quinn =

American actor

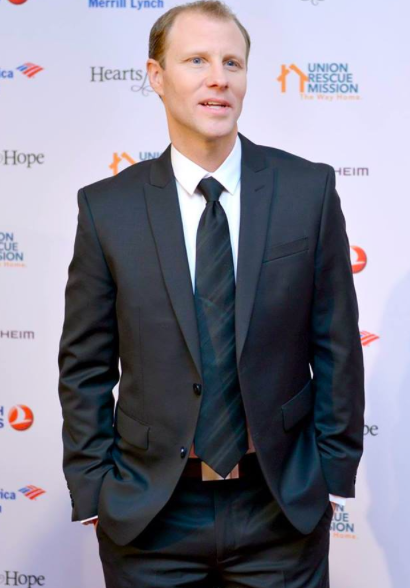
- O'Quinn at the Hearts for Hope Gala
- Born: Tivis Ryan O'Quinn; March 6, 1972 (age 54); Grundy, Virginia, U.S.
- Education: College of William & Mary
- Spouse: Heather O'Quinn (2001–present)
- Website: www.ryanoquinn.com

Ryan O'Quinn (born March 6, 1972) is an American film, television and voice actor, producer, author and comedian.

== Life and career ==
O'Quinn was born in Grundy, Virginia, and graduated from Grundy Senior High School. He attended the College of William & Mary in Virginia where he performed with the improvisational comedy troupe I.T. (Improvisational Theatre).

Shortly after moving to Los Angeles, O'Quinn booked a variety of television series including Alias, Third Rock from the Sun, and Beverly Hills, 90210, where he played the innocent but accused rapist of Kelly, played by Jennie Garth.

He is the founder and president of Damascus Road Productions, a Los-Angeles based film and television production company specializing in high quality family content. The company is located in Westlake Village, CA and has been featured in numerous magazines and entertainment publications. The site boasts a screening room, podcast studio, green screen soundstage, music editing suite and video editing bays.

O'Quinn is also a voice actor and has provided voice-over and voice matching in a number of movies, television shows and cartoons.

O'Quinn's improvisational comedy background led him to the world of online videos and he was a founding member of the comedy production group Very Angry Neighbors. His comedy shorts were featured on Good Morning America, Inside Edition, Bravo's Outrageous and Contagious Viral Videos, CW's Online Nation, Today Show, Fox and Friends, Access Hollywood, and many national television shows.

He co-founded a comedy entertainment company called "DadDudes". Their most popular viral video is a parody of the Disney song "For the First Time in Forever" from the 2013 animated film Frozen. The YouTube video, "Dads Respond to Disney's Frozen", has millions of hits and they appeared on a number of television talk shows and news programs.

O'Quinn filmed a sitcom pilot called Dad Dudes where he starred as a father in suburban Los Angeles. His father on the series is played by Jerry Mathers.

He has appeared on Fox's morning program Fox and Friends and other morning shows as a parenting expert following the release of two books, "Parenting Rules" and "Marriage Rules"

He was named "YouTube Star of the Moment" and "YouTube Star of the Month" by G4 Network series Attack of the Show.

O'Quinn is the lead actor in the film Believe that was partially filmed in his hometown of Grundy, Virginia. The film was released theatrically nationwide in the United States on December 2, 2016.

O'Quinn is the lead actor in the feature film Paul's Promise, the true story of Paul Holderfield Jr, a racist firefighter-turned-pastor in the height of the Civil Rights movement in the United States. He has won multiple awards for Best Actor for playing the role. The film was released theatrically in the U.S. in October 2022.

In 2021 O'Quinn and his wife Heather produced the film "Little Angels" starring Dean Cain that will be released in 2023. The couple also launched "Integrity Releasing" a film and television distribution company.

The husband-wife team also produced 2023's "Bringing Back Christmas" that was filmed at Capernaum Studios in Poolville, Texas.

Press releases show O'Quinn as the host of an upcoming weekly talk show focusing on celebrity news, faith, sports, lifestyle and DIY segments.

== Books ==
In December 2014 he released a comedy book on parenting called Parenting Rules! The Hilarious Handbook for Surviving Parenthood. The book became an Amazon number 1 bestseller in multiple categories.

In December 2015 Ryan O'Quinn released Marriage Rules! The Hilarious Handbook for Surviving Marriage from Broadstreet Publishing.

== References / News ==
- 'Paul's Promise' Movie Shares Spiritual Journey of an Arkansas ex-Segregationsit, Deadline 2021/10/25
- Mike Ilitch Jr Pacts with Ryan O'Quinn's Damascus Road Productions, Variety 2022/3/4
- Damascus Road, Dean Cain to Develop Biopic Based on Christian Author Bob Fraley, Deadline 2021/10/25
- O'Quinn, Damascus Road to Produce Dean Cain Starrer, Deadline 2021/6/30
- Paul's Promise, Filmed Here, Getting Ready to Roll, Sierra County Sentinel 2021/1/19
- Ted Farnsworth, Former MoviePass Exec, Inks 3 Motion Picture Deal, "Yahoo Finance" 2020/29/4
- Bringing Hollywood to Westlake, Westlake Magazine 2018/11/1
- Oscars: Academy Announces Songs for Original Score, Variety 2016/12/13
- Christmas Movie "Believe" Teaches Empathy to its Family-Friendly Audience, The Huffington Post 2016/12/8
- Believe Nominated for Best Film, The Christian Film Review 2016/12/27
- Filming wraps up in Bristol for Christmas-themed 'Believe', Bristol Herald Courier 2016/4/4
- 'Believe': A closer look at movie being filmed in Bristol, Grundy, Va. Bristol Herald Courier 2016/3/20
- Officials Recognize Local Economic Benefit Due to Filming Bluefield Daily Telegraph 2016/3/15
- Filming of ‘Believe’ transforms Grundy into a world of movie production Bluefield Daily Telegraph 2016/3/5
- ‘Believe’ it — movie about Grundy now being filmed in downtown Bristol Bristol Herald Courier 2016/2/28
- Southwest Virginia area scouted as site for new Christmas movie, Grundy Native Ryan O'Quinn to Star Bristol Herald Courier 2015/9/12
- Ryan O'Quinn Catches Comedy Virus, The Malibu Times July 11, 2007
