= Belle Prater's Boy =

1996 novel by Ruth White

- First edition
- Author: Ruth White
- Language: English
- Genre: Children's novel
- Publisher: FSG
- Publication date: 1996
- Publication place: United States
- Media type: Print (hardback & paperback)
- Pages: 208
- ISBN: 9780374306687

Belle Prater's Boy (1996) is a young adult novel by Ruth White that tells the story of 12-year-old Gypsy and her cousin Woodrow Prater, whose mother Belle Prater had mysteriously disappeared one morning. When Woodrow – the titular Belle Prater's boy – comes to town, she quickly befriends him in the hope that she will find out more about his mother's disappearance. The novel is set in 1950s Western Virginia. Belle Prater's Boy was named a Newbery Honor book in 1997, and a 1996 Boston Globe - Horn Book Awards Honor Book for Fiction.
