= Shortt Gap, Virginia =

Unincorporated community in Virginia, United States

- Unincorporated community
- Location within Virginia Location within the United States
- Coordinates: 37°09′26″N 81°52′22″W
- Country: United States
- State: Virginia
- County: Buchanan
- Elevation: 2,425 ft (739 m)
- Time zone: UTC−5 (Eastern (EST))
  - Summer (DST): UTC−4 (EDT)
- ZIP code: 24647
- Area code: 276
- GNIS feature ID: 1496224

Shortt Gap is an unincorporated community in Buchanan County, Virginia, United States. Shortt Gap is located along U.S. Route 460, northwest of Richlands. Shortt Gap has a post office with ZIP code 24647.
