= Prater, Virginia =

Unincorporated community in Virginia, United States

Prater
- Unincorporated community
- Location within the Commonwealth of Virginia Prater (the United States)
- Coordinates: 37°12′56″N 82°11′58″W
- Country: United States
- State: Virginia
- County: Buchanan
- Time zone: UTC−5 (Eastern (EST))
  - Summer (DST): UTC−4 (EDT)
- GNIS feature ID: 1499911

Prater is an unincorporated community located in Buchanan County, Virginia, United States. It is near the intersection of Virginia State Route 83 and County Route 604 in the western portion of the county. The community was the home of Russell Prater Elementary School until 2014.

A post office was established at Prater in 1877, and remained in operation until it was discontinued in 1965. According to tradition, Prater was named for the Prater brothers of pioneer settlers.
