= Hurley, Virginia =

Unincorporated community in Virginia, United States

Hurley
- Unincorporated community
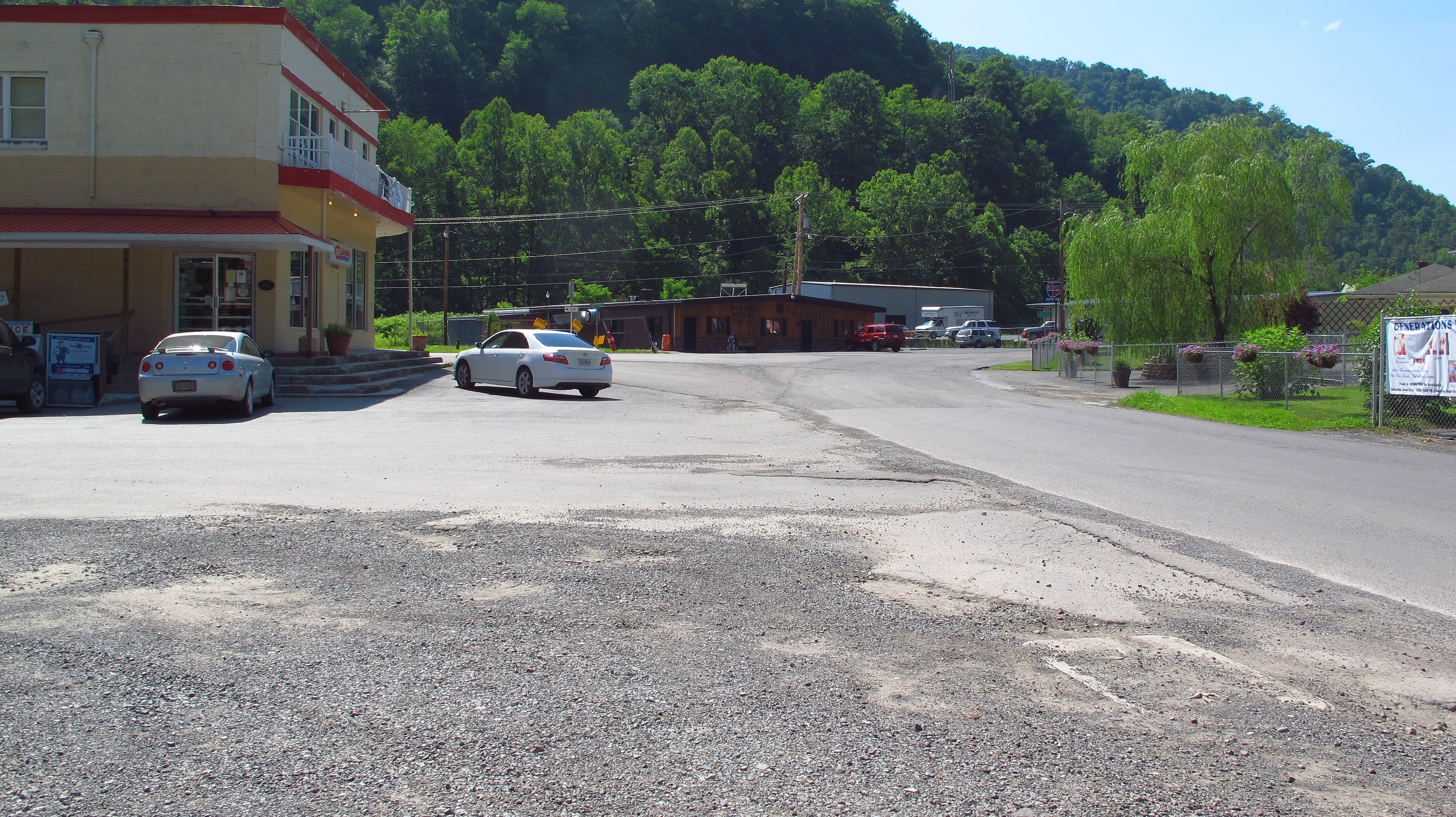
- State Route 643 in Hurley

- Location within the Commonwealth of Virginia Hurley (the United States)
- Coordinates: 37°25′13″N 82°01′11″W
- Country: United States
- State: Virginia
- County: Buchanan
- Time zone: UTC−5 (Eastern (EST))
  - Summer (DST): UTC−4 (EDT)

Hurley is an unincorporated community in Buchanan County, Virginia, United States, located at the convergence of County Routes 643, 646, 650, and 697, a short distance from the Kentucky and West Virginia state lines.

== History ==
The Hurley post office was established in 1893. The community was probably named for Samuel Robert Hurley, a pioneer settler. Located at the mouth of Lester's Fork and along Knox Creek, it became a timbering center in Buchanan County and was the headquarters for the William M. Ritter Lumber Company as well as a station on the narrow-gauge BS&C (Big Sandy and Cumberland) railroad. Ritter ran Shay engines on the line for his large lumber mill there and a few passenger cars along with his freight cars until the Norfolk and Western Railroad took it over in 1923, converting the rails to standard gauge and replacing the Shays with big, non-geared steam engines to serve the emerging coal industry in the area.

Hurley suffered devastating floods in 2002, which nearly wiped out the town. The recovery efforts resulted in an FBI and IRS investigation into alleged corruption surrounding the use of government funds.

== Schools ==
- Hurley High School
- Hurley Elementary/Middle School
