= Ruth White (children's author) =

American children's writer (1942–2017)

Ruth C. White
- Born: March 15, 1942; Whitewood, Virginia
- Died: June 8, 2017 (aged 75); Hummelstown, Pennsylvania
- Occupation: Author

Ruth C. White (March 15, 1942 — June 8, 2017) was an American children's writer. Her novel Belle Prater's Boy was a Newbery Honor Book in 1997.

== Work ==
- The City Rose, as Ruth White Miller (1977)
- Sweet Creek Holler
- Belle Prater's Boy, Newbery Honor, Boston Globe/Horn Book Honor
- Memories of Summer ALA Top Ten Books of the Year, 2001
- Tadpole biographical fiction
- Buttermilk Hill, a sequel to Weeping Willow
- The Search for Belle Prater, a sequel to "Belle Prater's Boy"
- Way Down Deep
- Little Audrey Booklist Top of the List, 2009
- The Treasure of Way Down Deep
- You'll Like it Here (Everybody Does)
- A month of Sundays

Self-published:

- Diary of a Wildflower, loosely based on the author's mother's early years
- Lily of the Valley: Mansions of Karma, book 1
- Serendipity: Memoir of a Mystic'
- The Blues of Lotus Hall
- Hanging With Ecila
