= Hurley High School =

Public high school in Virginia, US

Hurley High School (Virginia)
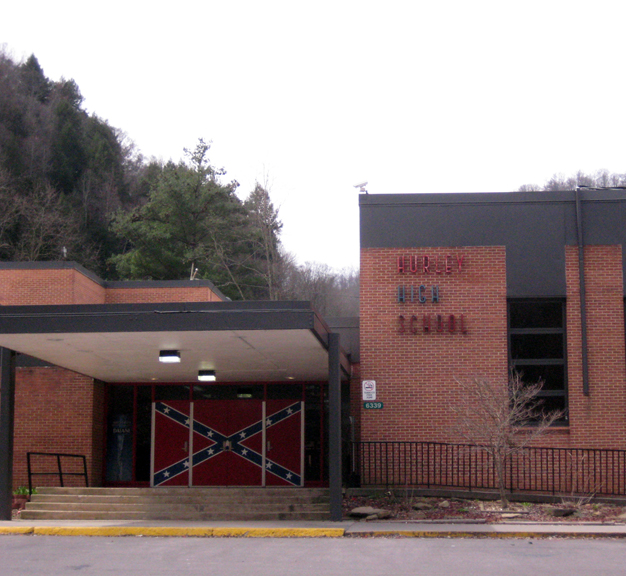

Location
- 6339 Hurley Rd; Hurley, Virginia 24620; United States; 37°22′48.2″N 82°00′01.7″W

Information
- School type: Public high school
- Founded: 1969
- School district: Buchanan County Public Schools
- Principal: Greg Tester
- Grades: 8–12
- Enrollment: 234 (2016-17)
- Language: English
- Colors: Red, Blue, and Grey
- Athletics conference: VHSL Class 1 VHSL Region D VHSL Black Diamond District
- Mascot: Rebels
- Communities served: Hurley, Virginia
- Feeder schools: Hurley Elementary/ Middle School
- Website: Official Site

Hurley High School was a public high school located in Hurley, Virginia in Buchanan County, Virginia, United States. Opened in 1969 to replace the earlier high school, which became D.A. Justus Elementary. It is part of the Buchanan County Public Schools system.

At the end of the 2025-2026 school year, Hurley High School has closed and consolidated with the three other current Buchanan County High Schools to create the new Southern Gap High School.

== Extracurricular activities ==
Hurley was awarded with the 2011 championship for Creative Writing. Clubs and organizations at the school include: Future Business Leaders of America, Student Council Association, National Beta Club, Scholastic Bowl, FCCLA, Forensics

== Sports ==
Athletic teams compete in the Virginia High School League's Black Diamond District in Region D. Its mascot is a Rebel soldier with a confederate flag. The school's boys basketball team was given the Marshall Johnson Sportsmanship Award for Basketball for the 2010–2011 season.

== Controversial Stance ==
The school prominently displays the Confederate flag across school property and during school events that occur on the premises. "Mountain Independence" and "Heritage, not Hate" are given as reasons for the display.

== Relocation ==
In January 2020, the Huntington District of the United States Army Corps of Engineers (USACE) announced the allocation of $235.6 million to Buchanan County for flood relief protection. The funding was made available through the Additional Supplemental Appropriations for Disaster Relief Act, a bipartisan bill which was signed into law on June 6, 2019, to help communities construct flood and storm damage reduction projects. Under USACE's plan, the project's primary components included a voluntary floodproofing and floodplain evacuation program, in which the Buchanan County Career, Technology & Higher Learning Center (BCCTHLC) would get a ring wall to protect it from flooding, while Hurley High School qualified for relocation. Although USACE had primary responsibility for selecting a new site in Hurley, the Buchanan County School Board was allowed to choose an alternative site, which it did in February 2020 by selecting Southern Gap for the high school's relocation.
