= Blessings in a Backpack =

US non-profit organization

Blessings in a Backpack is a non-profit organization that feeds school children in the United States who currently are fed during the week on the federally funded Free and Reduced Meal Program and are at risk of going hungry on the weekends. Its mission is to mobilize communities, individuals, and resources to provide food on the weekends for elementary school children across America who might otherwise go hungry. The program works with elementary school-aged children whose families cannot afford enough food. Better test scores, improved reading skills, positive behavior, improved health and increased attendance have all been attributed to the success of this program. As of March 2016, the program is feeding more than 88,000 children in 46 states and Washington, D.C., at 950 schools in the United States. The organization gained widespread attention after Dale Earnhardt Jr. tweeted about a mayonnaise-banana sandwich, which gained unexpected widespread attention, and asked fans to donate money to Blessings in a Backpack and agreed to match up to $50,000.
