= Council, Virginia =

Unincorporated community in Virginia, United States

- Unincorporated community
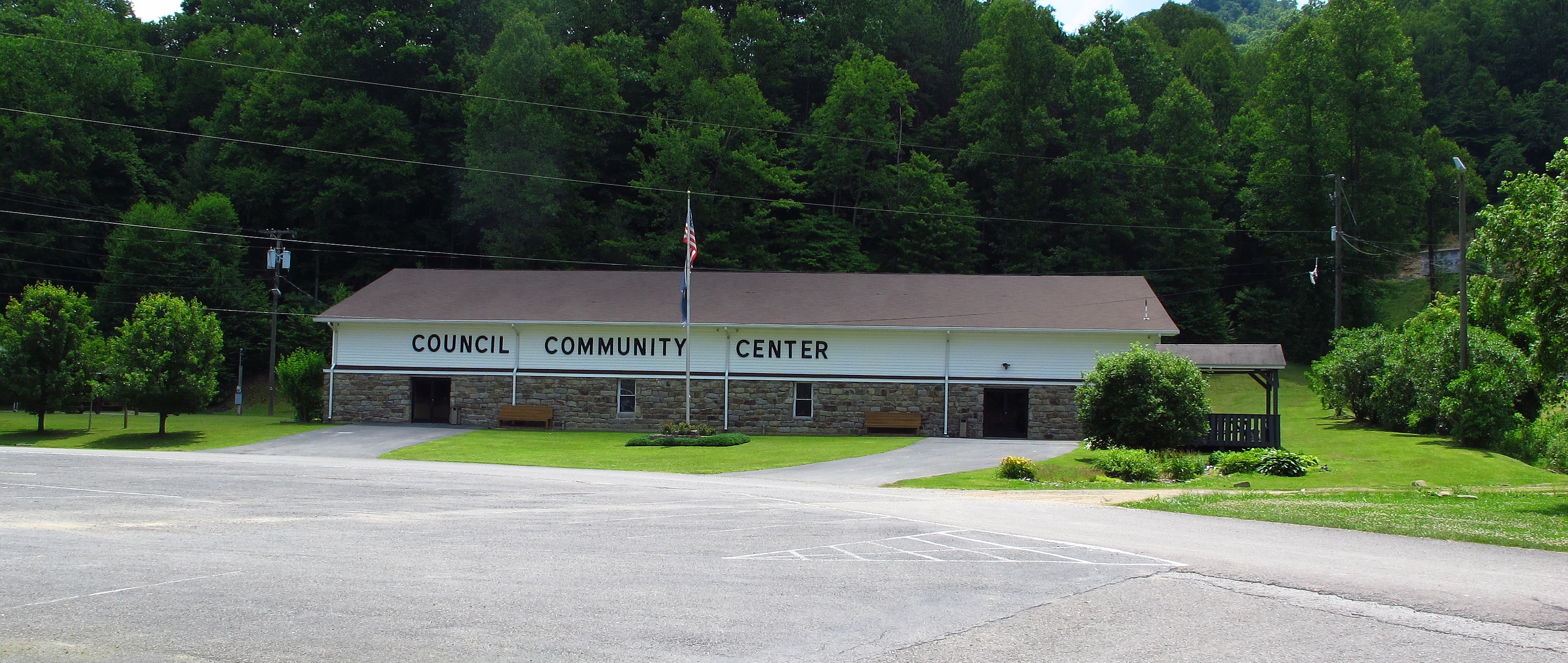
- Community Center in Council

- Location within Virginia Location within the United States
- Coordinates: 37°04′49″N 82°04′06″W
- Country: United States
- State: Virginia
- County: Buchanan

Area
  - Land: 91.319 sq mi (236.52 km^{2})
  - Water: 0.389 sq mi (1.01 km^{2})
- Elevation: 1,867 ft (569 m)
- Time zone: UTC-5 (Eastern (EST))
  - Summer (DST): UTC-4 (EDT)
- Postal code: 24260
- Area code: 276
- GNIS feature ID: 1492809

Council is an unincorporated community in Buchanan County, Virginia, United States.

== Economy ==
Council Industrial Park is located in Council. In 2021, textile manufacturer "Maine Five" announced it was opening a sewing factory at the industrial park, and planned to employ 100 workers by 2026.

== Notable people ==
- Helen Timmons Henderson, elected to the Virginia state legislature.
- William Henry McFarland (born 1890), member of the Virginia House of Delegates
- Ashley Stroehlein, sports reporter.
