= Pilgrims Knob, Virginia =

Unincorporated community in Virginia, United States

Pilgrims Knob
- Unincorporated community
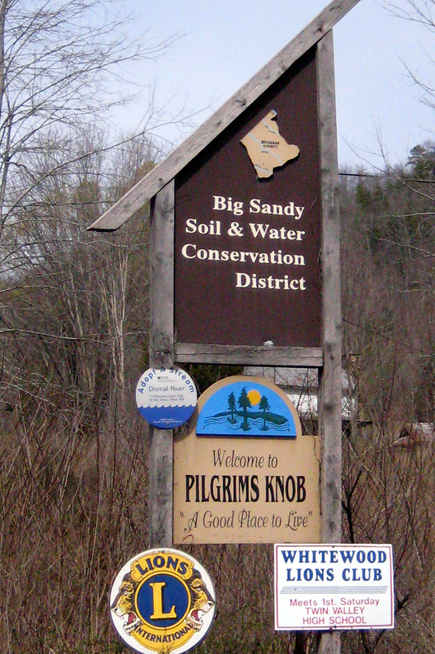
- Pilgrims Knob

- Location within the Commonwealth of Virginia Pilgrims Knob (the United States)
- Coordinates: 37°14′19″N 81°54′44″W
- Country: United States
- State: Virginia
- County: Buchanan

Population (2000)
  - Total: 479
- Time zone: UTC−5 (Eastern (EST))
  - Summer (DST): UTC−4 (EDT)

Pilgrims Knob is an unincorporated community in Buchanan County, Virginia, United States. As of the 2000 census, the Pilgrims Knob area had a population of 479. It is located at 37°14′19″N 81°54′44″W along the Dismal River, part of the watershed of the Big Sandy River, at the junction of Virginia State Routes 638 and 680.

The area was first settled in 1833 by Milton Ward. However, the area was not named until 1938 when the first post office was opened by Thomas Ward, a descendant of Milton Ward, under the name "Pilgrim Knob". The name was given by Ward's wife in honor of the pioneers who first settled the area.
