= Twin Valley High School (Virginia) =

Public high school in Virginia, US

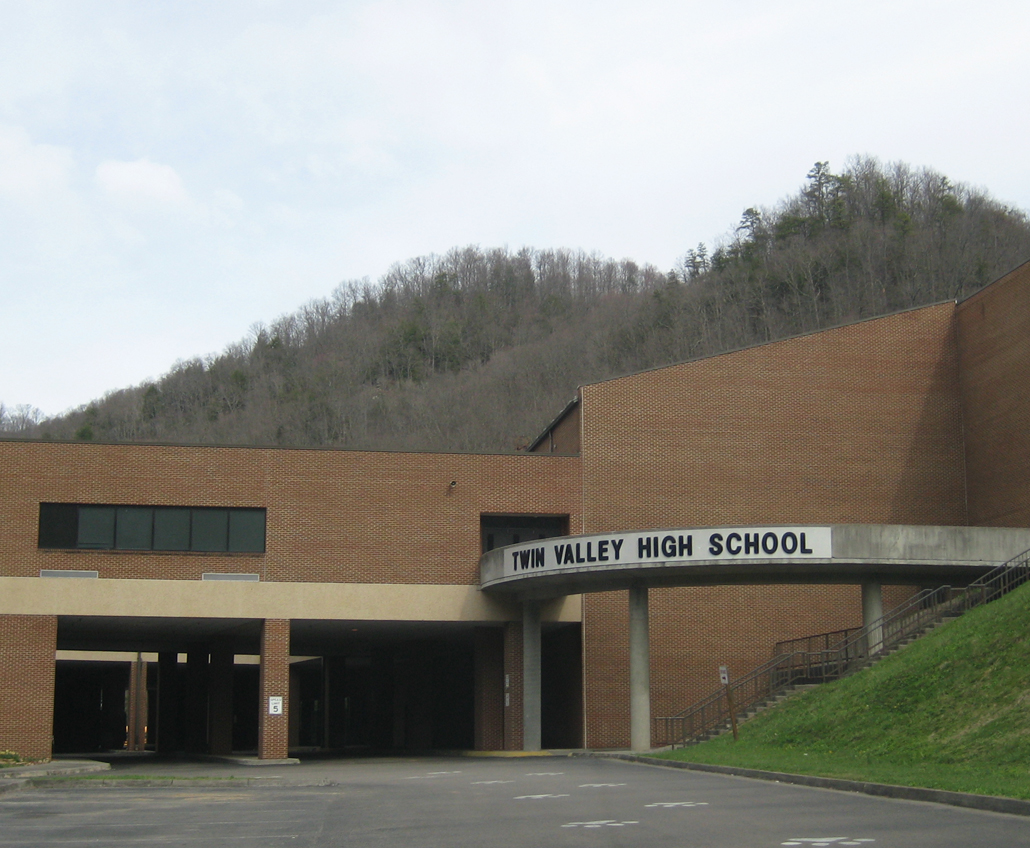

Location
- 14555 Dismal River Road; Pilgrim Knob, Virginia 24634; United States; 37°14′25″N 81°54′48″W

Information
- School type: Public high school
- Founded: 2001
- Status: Closed (2026)
- School district: Buchanan County Public Schools
- Principal: Chad Stevens
- Teaching staff: 15.70 (on an FTE basis)
- Grades: 8th–12th
- Gender: Coed
- Enrollment: 231 (2017–18)
- Language: English
- Schedule: August - May
- Colors: Black, Purple, Silver
- Athletics conference: VHSL Class 1 VHSL Region D VHSL Black Diamond District
- Mascot: Panther
- Website: https://tvhs.bcpsk12.com/

Twin Valley High School was a public high school located in Pilgrim Knob in Buchanan County, Virginia. It is part of the Buchanan County Public Schools system and was founded in 2001 with the consolidation of the former Garden and Whitewood High Schools. The school is the second largest public high school in Buchanan County with an enrollment of slightly over 200 students (2018–2019 estimate).

At the end of the 2025–2026 school year, Twin Valley High School will close and consolidate with the three other current Buchanan County High Schools to create the new Southern Gap High School.

== Athletics ==
The school has many sports including football, basketball, softball, baseball, tennis, golf, track & field, volleyball, cross country, and forensics, as well as an academic and a theatre team.

The Twin Valley athletic teams compete in the Virginia High School League's Division Black Diamond District in Region D.

== Teaching ==
The school takes on the Standards of Learning test issued by the Virginia Department of Education. The test demonstrates what the student knows about the specific subject and if the student needs to retake the class.
