= Oakwood, Virginia =

Unincorporated community in Virginia, United States

Oakwood
- Unincorporated Town
- Oakwood
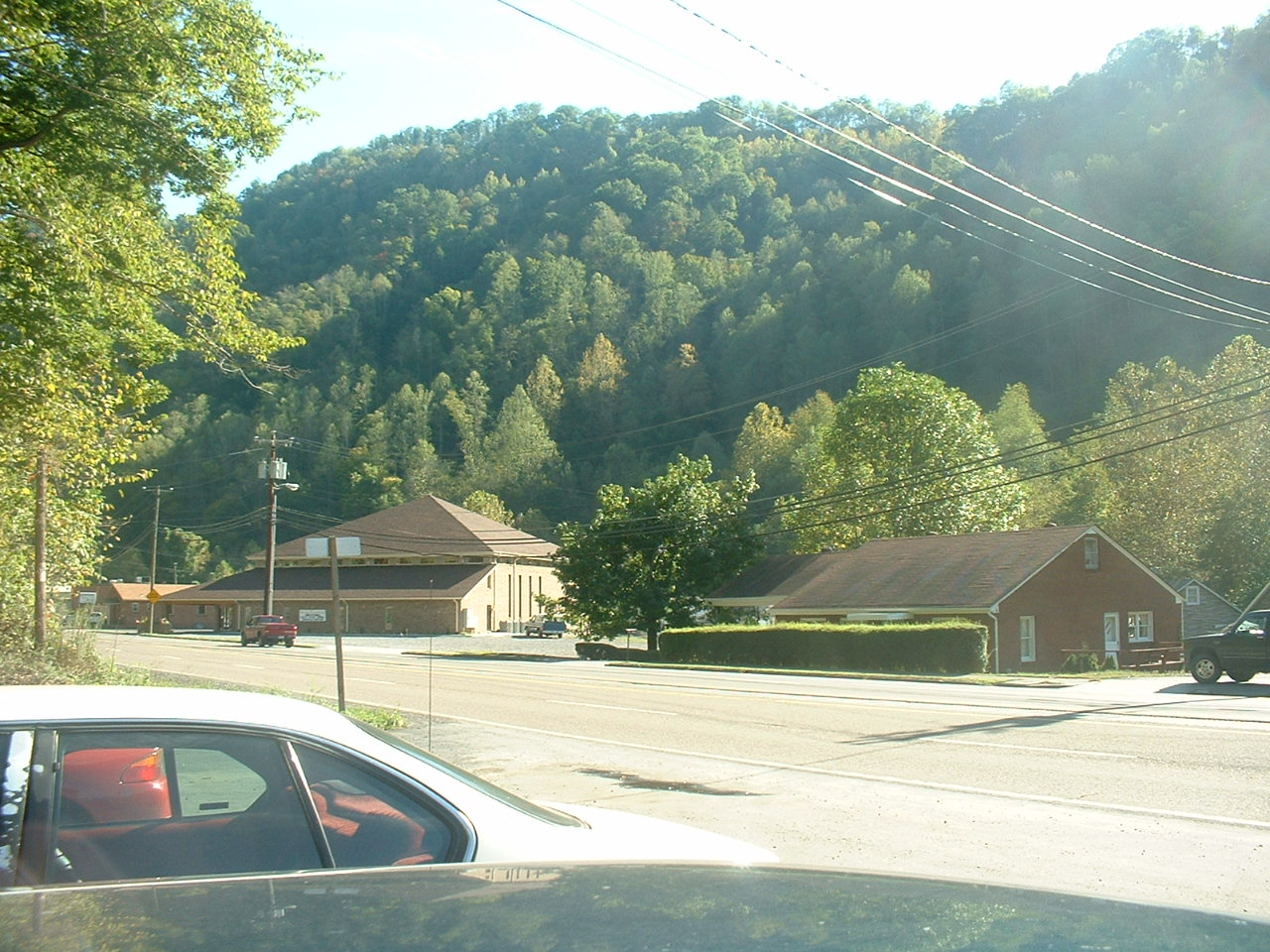
- View of Oakwood, circa 2002
- Nicknames: Keen MTN., Garden
- Location within the Commonwealth of Virginia Oakwood (the United States)
- Coordinates: 37°12′48″N 82°0′22″W
- Country: United States
- State: Virginia
- County: Buchanan
- Time zone: UTC−5 (Eastern (EST))
  - Summer (DST): UTC−4 (EDT)
- Area code: 498
- GNIS feature ID: 1499817

Oakwood is an unincorporated town in Buchanan County, Virginia, United States, located at the intersection of U.S. Route 460 and Secondary Route 624. The Appalachian College of Pharmacy is in Oakwood, on the campus of the former Garden High School.

The Oakwood post office was established in 1938. The community was likely named for the valuable oak timber in the area.
