= Buchanan County, Virginia =

County in Virginia, United States

- County
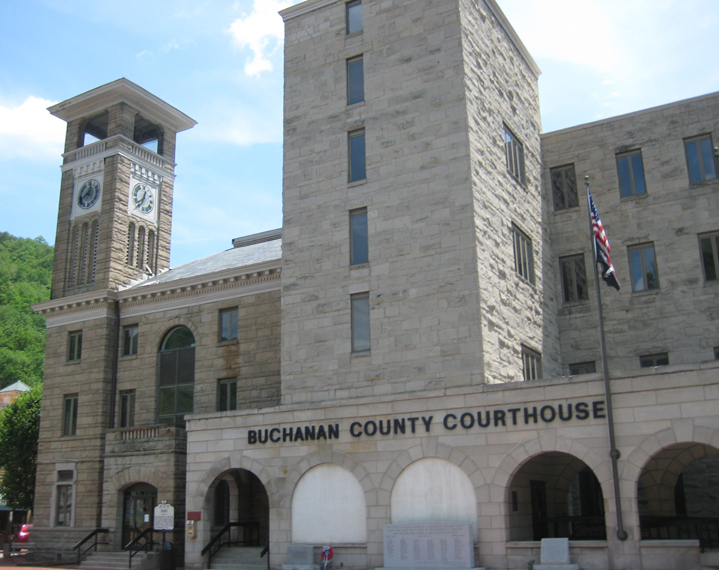
- Buchanan County Courthouse in Grundy

- Seal

- Location within the U.S. state of Virginia
- Coordinates: 37°16′N 82°02′W
- Country: United States
- State: Virginia
- Founded: 1858
- Named for: James Buchanan
- Seat: Grundy
- Largest town: Grundy

Area
  - Total: 504 sq mi (1,310 km^{2})
  - Land: 503 sq mi (1,300 km^{2})
  - Water: 1.1 sq mi (2.8 km^{2}) 0.2%

Population (2020)
  - Total: 20,355
  - Estimate (2025): 18,492 ▼
  - Density: 40.5/sq mi (15.6/km^{2})
- Time zone: UTC−5 (Eastern)
  - Summer (DST): UTC−4 (EDT)
- Congressional district: 9th
- Website: buchanancountyvirginia.gov

Buchanan County (/bə.kæn.ən/) is a United States county in far western Virginia, the only county in the state to border both West Virginia and Kentucky. The county is part of the Southwest Virginia region and lies in the rugged Appalachian Plateau portion of the Appalachian Mountains. Its county seat is Grundy. Buchanan County was established in 1858 from parts of Russell and Tazewell counties, and it was named in honor of then-President James Buchanan. In 1880, part of Buchanan County was taken to form Dickenson County.

As of the 2020 census, the county population was 20,355. Its population has decreased by double digits in each census over the last forty years. As of 2012, Buchanan was the fifth-poorest county in Virginia, when ranked by median household income; it has consistently been in the bottom 5% over the past decade.

== History ==
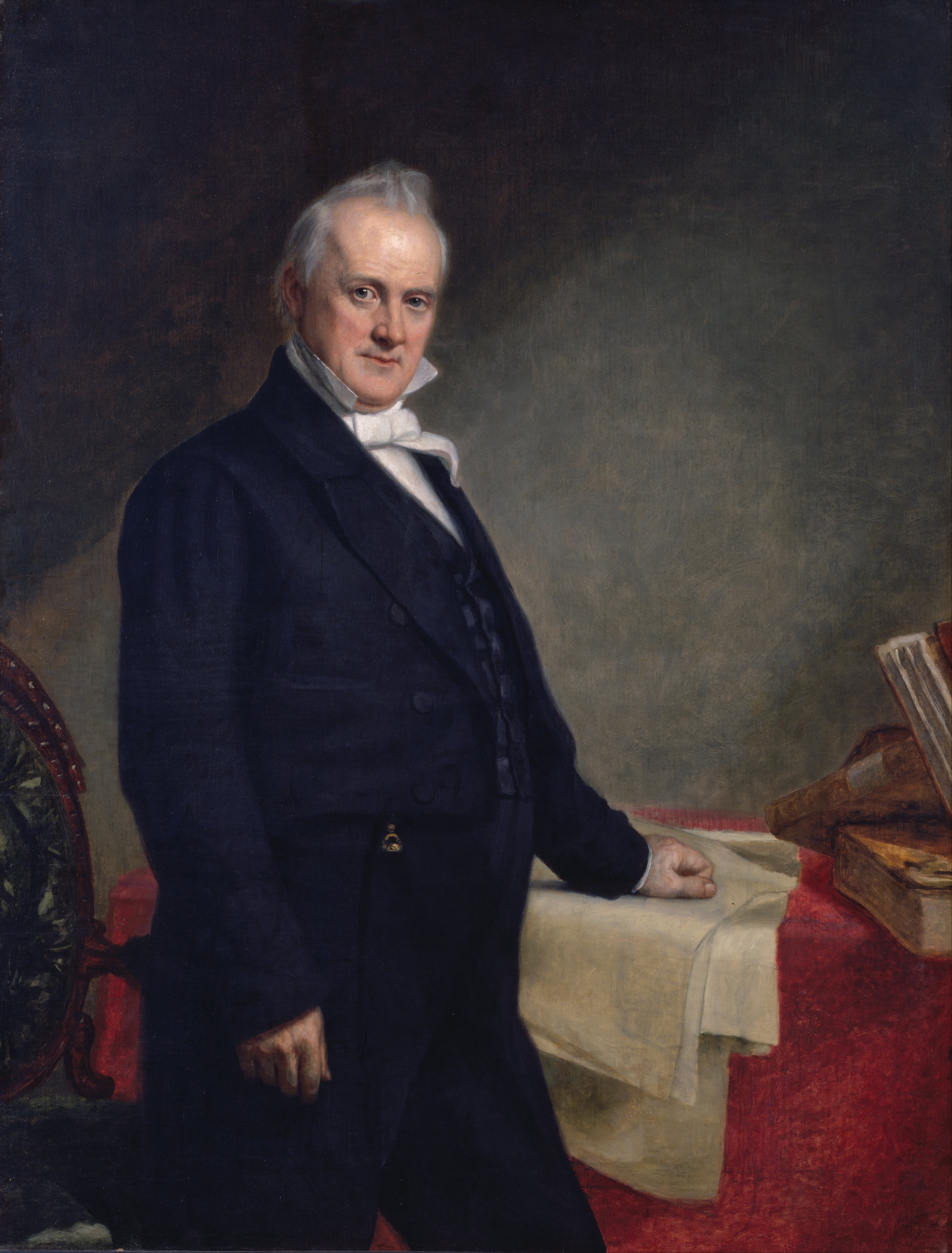
President James Buchanan, for whom the county was named.

The county was formed in 1858 from parts of Russell and Tazewell counties. It was named for James Buchanan, the 15th President of the United States. In 1876, Grundy was chosen and designated by the legislature as the county seat of Buchanan County, it was named in honor of Felix Grundy, a United States Senator from Tennessee.

In 1880, the southwestern part of Buchanan County was combined with parts of Russell and Wise counties to become Dickenson County.

Helen Timmons Henderson (1877–1925) participated in the work of the Buchanan Mission School at Council, Virginia. She and Sarah Lee Fain (1888–1962) of Norfolk were the first two women to be elected to the Virginia General Assembly. They were both Democrats in the House of Delegates. When Henderson was in office, delegates approved construction of 6.2 miles (10.0 km) of improved road to be built from Russell County, across Big "A" Mountain, to Council. What is now Route 80 is also known as "Helen Henderson Highway".

On April 23, 1938, 45 miners died when the Red Jacket mine exploded.

== Geography ==
According to the U.S. Census Bureau, the county has a total area of 503.8 square miles (1,304.8 km^{2}), of which 502.7 square miles (1,302.0 km^{2}) is land and 1.1 square miles (2.8 km^{2}) (0.2%) is water. Outdoor recreation is provided by Poplar Gap Park near Grundy and William P. Harris Park located in Council.

=== Districts ===
The county is divided into seven supervisor districts: Garden, Hurricane, Knox, North Grundy, Prater, Rock Lick, and South Grundy.

=== Adjacent counties ===
- Mingo County, West Virginia – north
- McDowell County, West Virginia – east
- Tazewell County – southeast
- Russell County – south
- Dickenson County – southwest
- Pike County, Kentucky – northwest

=== Major highways ===
- US 460
- SR 80
- SR 83

== Demographics ==
Historical population
Census	Pop.	Note	%±
1860	2,793		—
1870	3,777		35.2%
1880	5,694		50.8%
1890	5,867		3.0%
1900	9,692		65.2%
1910	12,334		27.3%
1920	15,441		25.2%
1930	16,740		8.4%
1940	31,477		88.0%
1950	35,748		13.6%
1960	36,724		2.7%
1970	32,071		−12.7%
1980	37,989		18.5%
1990	31,333		−17.5%
2000	26,978		−13.9%
2010	24,098		−10.7%
2020	20,355		−15.5%
2025 (est.)	18,492	▼	−9.2%
U.S. Decennial Census; 1790–1960 1900–1990; 1990–2000 2010 2020

=== Racial and ethnic composition ===
Buchanan County, Virginia – Racial and ethnic composition Note: the US Census treats Hispanic/Latino as an ethnic category. This table excludes Latinos from the racial categories and assigns them to a separate category. Hispanics/Latinos may be of any race.
Race / Ethnicity (NH = Non-Hispanic)	Pop 1980	Pop 1990	Pop 2000	Pop 2010	Pop 2020	% 1980	% 1990	% 2000	% 2010	% 2020
White alone (NH)	37,579	30,954	26,007	23,205	19,210	98.92%	98.79%	96.40%	96.29%	94.37%
Black or African American alone (NH)	19	55	706	614	613	0.05%	0.18%	2.62%	2.55%	3.01%
Native American or Alaska Native alone (NH)	15	26	15	18	15	0.04%	0.08%	0.06%	0.07%	0.07%
Asian alone (NH)	40	37	37	53	49	0.11%	0.12%	0.14%	0.22%	0.24%
Native Hawaiian or Pacific Islander alone (NH)	x	x	1	2	1	x	x	0.00%	0.01%	0.00%
Other race alone (NH)	0	4	1	4	10	0.00%	0.01%	0.00%	0.02%	0.05%
Mixed race or Multiracial (NH)	x	x	83	107	280	x	x	0.31%	0.44%	1.38%
Hispanic or Latino (any race)	336	257	128	95	177	0.88%	0.82%	0.47%	0.39%	0.87%
Total	37,989	31,333	26,978	24,098	20,355	100.00%	100.00%	100.00%	100.00%	100.00%

=== 2020 census ===
As of the 2020 census, the county had a population of 20,355. The median age was 47.8 years. 17.5% of residents were under the age of 18 and 22.4% of residents were 65 years of age or older. For every 100 females there were 104.6 males, and for every 100 females age 18 and over there were 104.1 males age 18 and over.

The racial makeup of the county was 94.8% White, 3.0% Black or African American, 0.1% American Indian and Alaska Native, 0.3% Asian, 0.0% Native Hawaiian and Pacific Islander, 0.1% from some other race, and 1.7% from two or more races. Hispanic or Latino residents of any race comprised 0.9% of the population.

0.0% of residents lived in urban areas, while 100.0% lived in rural areas.

There were 8,483 households in the county, of which 23.4% had children under the age of 18 living with them and 27.9% had a female householder with no spouse or partner present. About 30.7% of all households were made up of individuals and 15.2% had someone living alone who was 65 years of age or older.

There were 10,323 housing units, of which 17.8% were vacant. Among occupied housing units, 78.4% were owner-occupied and 21.6% were renter-occupied. The homeowner vacancy rate was 1.1% and the rental vacancy rate was 13.9%.

=== 2000 census ===
Age distribution of Buchanan County, Virginia.

As of the census of 2000, there were 26,978 people, 10,464 households, and 7,900 families residing in the county. The population density was 54 people per square mile (21 people/km^{2}). There were 11,887 housing units at an average density of 24 units per square mile (9.3 units/km^{2}). The racial makeup of the county was 96.75% White, 2.62% Black or African American, 0.06% Native American, 0.14% Asian, 0.10% from other races, 0.33% from two or more races, and 0.47% of the population were Hispanic or Latino of any race.

There were 10,464 households, out of which 30.60% had children under the age of 18 living with them, 60.90% were married couples living together, 10.60% had a female householder with no husband present, and 24.50% were non-families. Of all households, 22.50% were made up of individuals, and 9.40% had someone living alone who was 65 years of age or older. The average household size was 2.46 and the average family size was 2.87.

In the county, the population was spread out, with 21.40% under the age of 18, 8.50% from 18 to 24, 31.20% from 25 to 44, 27.50% from 45 to 64, and 11.50% who were 65 years of age or older. The median age was 39 years. For every 100 females there were 102.90 males. For every 100 females aged 18 and over, there were 102.30 males.

The median income for a household in the county was $22,213, and the median income for a family was $27,328. Males had a median income of $29,540 versus $17,766 for females. The per capita income for the county was $12,788. About 19.80% of families and 23.20% of the population were below the poverty line, including 30.20% of those under age 18 and 16.90% of those age 65 or over.

== Government and politics ==
United States presidential election results for Buchanan County, Virginia
Year	Republican		Democratic		Third party(ies)	
Year	No.	%	No.	%	No.	%
1912	223	19.60%	524	46.05%	391	34.36%
1916	827	53.22%	720	46.33%	7	0.45%
1920	1,078	61.42%	675	38.46%	2	0.11%
1924	1,080	54.93%	870	44.25%	16	0.81%
1928	1,333	49.41%	1,365	50.59%	0	0.00%
1932	727	34.57%	1,372	65.24%	4	0.19%
1936	808	29.94%	1,886	69.88%	5	0.19%
1940	1,291	33.55%	2,554	66.37%	3	0.08%
1944	1,971	41.02%	2,826	58.81%	8	0.17%
1948	2,085	39.15%	3,174	59.61%	66	1.24%
1952	2,330	38.65%	3,613	59.93%	86	1.43%
1956	3,191	46.71%	3,616	52.94%	24	0.35%
1960	2,370	38.86%	3,706	60.76%	23	0.38%
1964	2,349	32.97%	4,756	66.76%	19	0.27%
1968	3,699	37.68%	5,003	50.97%	1,114	11.35%
1972	4,801	56.13%	3,566	41.69%	187	2.19%
1976	3,850	35.89%	5,791	53.98%	1,087	10.13%
1980	4,554	42.85%	5,768	54.27%	307	2.89%
1984	5,053	38.71%	7,828	59.97%	172	1.32%
1988	3,912	35.68%	6,935	63.25%	118	1.08%
1992	3,297	28.17%	7,405	63.27%	1,002	8.56%
1996	2,785	26.96%	6,551	63.40%	996	9.64%
2000	3,867	39.23%	5,745	58.29%	244	2.48%
2004	4,507	45.85%	5,275	53.67%	47	0.48%
2008	4,541	51.99%	4,063	46.52%	130	1.49%
2012	6,436	66.72%	3,094	32.08%	116	1.20%
2016	7,296	78.90%	1,721	18.61%	230	2.49%
2020	8,311	83.50%	1,587	15.94%	55	0.55%
2024	7,939	85.03%	1,355	14.51%	43	0.46%

Regionally, Buchanan County is represented by Republican Travis Hackworth in the 38th district of the Virginia Senate, Republican James W. "Will" Morefield in the 3rd district of the Virginia House of Delegates and Republican Morgan Griffith in Virginia's 9th congressional district of the U.S. House of Representatives.

In presidential elections held from 1928 to 2004, Buchanan County voted solidly Democratic, though following the 2008 Presidential Election, Buchanan County shifted decidedly towards the right of the two-party system, becoming a Republican stronghold. The flip followed a perceived espousal of more environmentally-concerned and progressive rhetoric by Democratic candidates, leaving many former conservative Democratic voters in the coal industry-dominant county to switch party allegiance from the 2010 midterm elections onward when they helped oust Congressman Rick Boucher in favor of then-candidate, Morgan Griffith.

=== Board of Supervisors ===
The Buchanan County Board of Supervisors represents its seven districts, each district receiving one board member that stands for election biennially on odd-numbered years. As of September 14, 2026, Tim Hess was the Board Chairman, Jeff Cooper serving as Vice-Chairman.

- Garden District: Jeff Cooper (R)
- Hurricane District: Tim Hess (R)
- Knox District: Trey Adkins (R)
- North Grundy District: Lee Dotson (R)
- Prater District: David Rose (R)
- Rock Lick District: Craig Stiltner (R)
- South Grundy District: G. Roger Rife (R)

=== Constitutional officers ===
- Clerk of the Circuit Court: Beverly S. Tiller (D)
- Commissioner of the Revenue: A. Ruth Horn (R)
- Commonwealth's Attorney: M. Nikki Stiltner (R)
- Sheriff: Allen Boyd (D)
- Treasurer: Keith Boyd (R)

== Education ==
=== Colleges ===
- Appalachian School of Law, Grundy
- Appalachian College of Pharmacy, Oakwood

=== Private schools ===
- Mountain Mission School, Grundy
- Keen Mountain Christian Academy, Oakwood

=== Public schools ===
All public schools in Buchanan County are operated by Buchanan County Public Schools system. Starting with the Fall 2026 semester, all high schools in Buchanan County were consolidated into Southern Gap High School. Combined were Grundy, Hurley, Council and Twin Valley High Schools, the latter of the four being the result of a 2001 consolidation of the former Garden and Whitewood High Schools.

The county operates four elementary schools: Twin Valley Elementary-Middle School, Council Elementary School, Riverview Elementary-Middle School and Hurley Elementary-Middle School. In addition, the county operates the Buchanan County, Career, Technical & Higher Learning Center, which provides education and training in trade programs to its students.

== Communities ==
=== Town ===
- Grundy

=== Census-designated places ===
- Big Rock
- Breaks
- Vansant

=== Other unincorporated communities ===
- Big Rock
- Council
- Davenport
- Harman
- Harman Junction
- Hurley
- Janey
- Keen Mountain
- Leemaster
- Mavisdale
- Maxie
- Oakwood
- Pilgrims Knob
- Prater
- Shack Mills
- Shortt Gap
- Stacy
- Rowe
- Whitewood

== See also ==
- National Register of Historic Places listings in Buchanan County, Virginia
- The Virginia Mountaineer
