= Lewis Fork Wilderness =

Wilderness area in Virginia, United States

- IUCN category Ib (wilderness area)
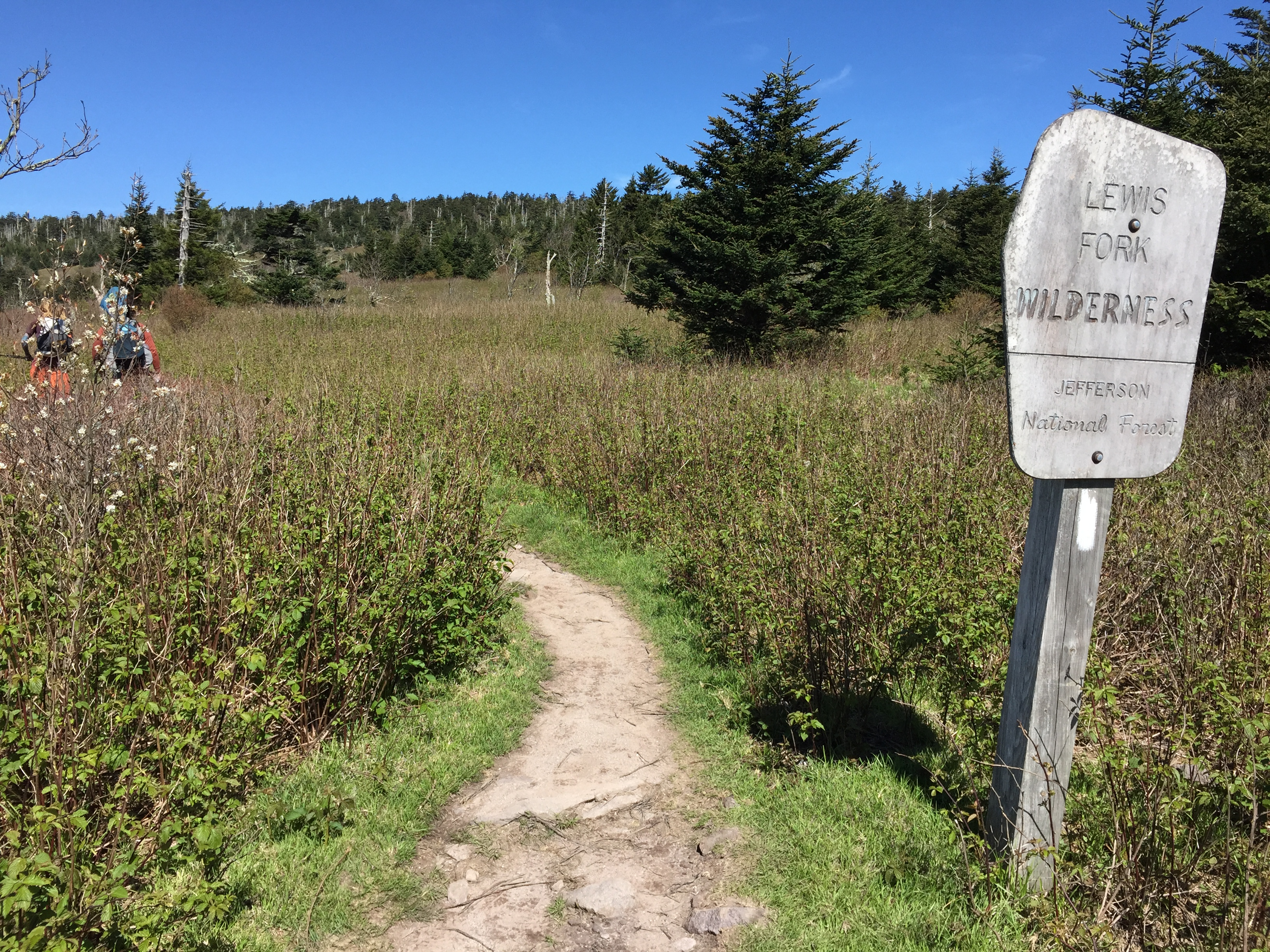
- Sign for the wilderness boundary along the Appalachian Trail

- Location within Virginia
- Location: Grayson County, Smyth County Virginia, United States
- Nearest city: Abingdon, Virginia
- Coordinates: 36.65972°N 81.54472°W
- Area: 6,076 acres (2,459 ha)
- Established: 1984
- Administrator: U.S. Forest Service

The Lewis Fork Wilderness is an area in the Mount Rogers National Recreation Area protected by the Eastern Wilderness Act of Congress to maintain its present, natural condition. As part of the wilderness system, it is intended to preserve a variety of natural life forms and contribute to a diversity of plant and animal gene pools. Over half of the ecosystems in the United States exist within designated wilderness.

The highlight of the wilderness is Mount Rogers, which at 5729 feet is the tallest mountain in Virginia and the highest point in the Appalachians between North Carolina and New Hampshire. With frequent cloud cover and moist moss draping from rocks and tree limbs, the wooded area at the top of the mountain creates a sense of awe in a silence so quiet that a finger snap can produce an echo.

The area is part of the Mount Rogers Cluster.

== Location and access ==
The wilderness is on the southeast side of the Mount Rogers National Recreation Area, near the town of Konnarock in Grayson and Smyth Counties. It is bounded by Whitetop Road (SR 600) on the west, Laurel Valley Road (SR 603) on the north, and Pine Mountain on the southeast.

Boundary of Lewis Fork Wilderness

The Appalachian Trail passes in an out of the wilderness for a total 5.5 miles in the wilderness. Trailheads are near Elk Garden on the south and Grayson Highlands State Park on the north.

Other Trails in the area include:

- Cliffside Trail, FS 4533B, 1.4 miles, difficult, no blazes
- Grassy Branch Trail, FS 4535, 3.2 miles, moderate, no blazes
- Helton Creek Trail, FS 4538, 3.4 miles, moderate, no blazes
- Lewis Fork Trail, FS 4533, 5.5 miles, moderate/difficult, no blazes
- Mount Rogers Trail, FS 166, 4.1 miles, difficult, no blazes
- Old Orchard Trail, FS 4533A, 1.6 miles, moderate, no blazes
- Pine Mountain Trail, FS 4595, 2 miles, moderate, blue blazes
- Sugar Maple Trail, FS 4572, 2.3 miles, moderate, no blazes

== Natural history ==
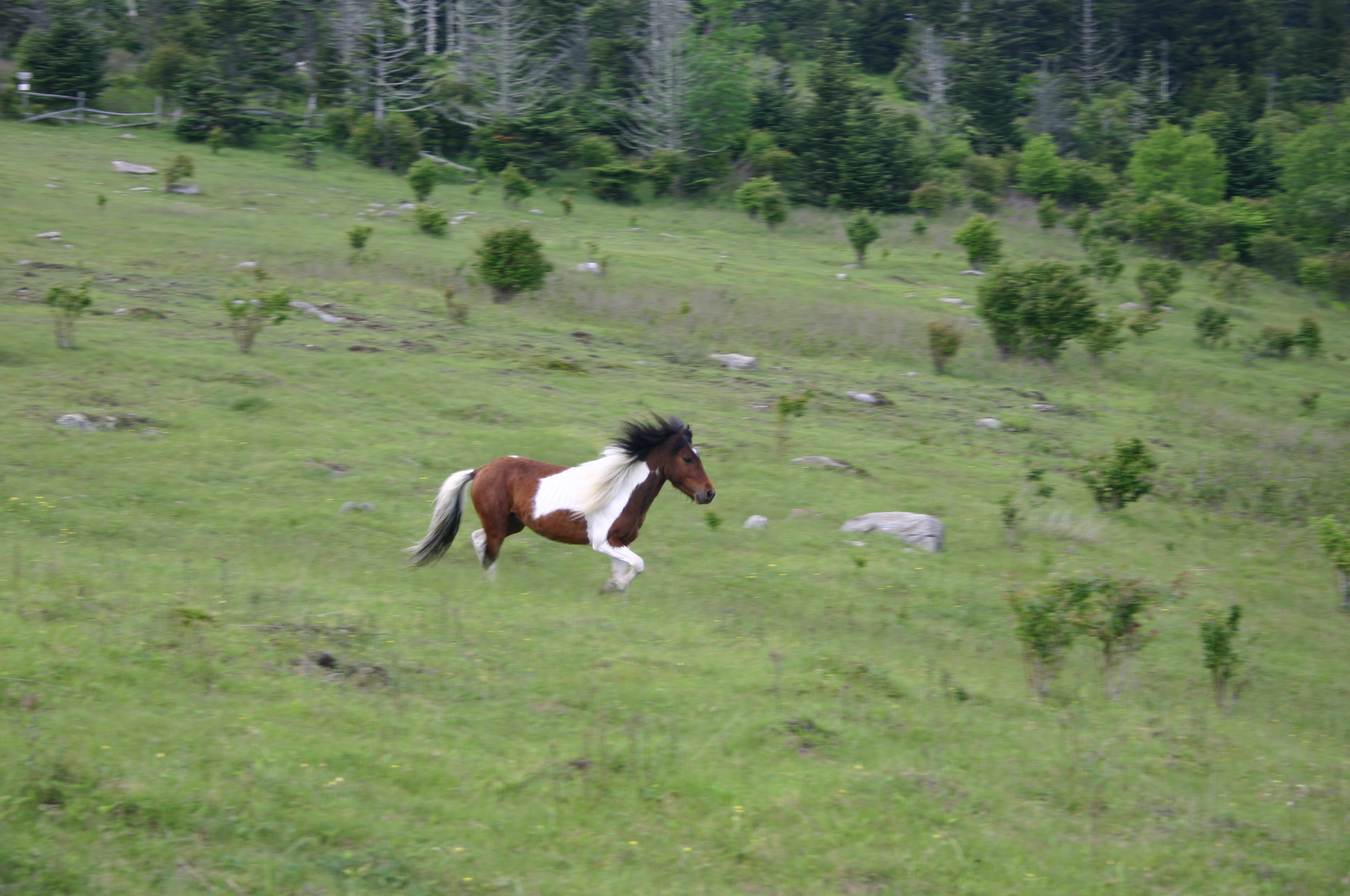
Mt. Rogers Wild Ponies

Habitats created by high elevations, extended slopes and streams support a large biological diversity. The wilderness and surrounding country are considered one of the most important centers for biological diversity in the eastern United States. Besides the oak-hickory forest common in eastern deciduous woodlands, a variety of forest communities include cove forests in rich, moist secluded areas; northern hardwood forests on upper slopes; and seeps, wet places supplied by water from an underground aquifer.

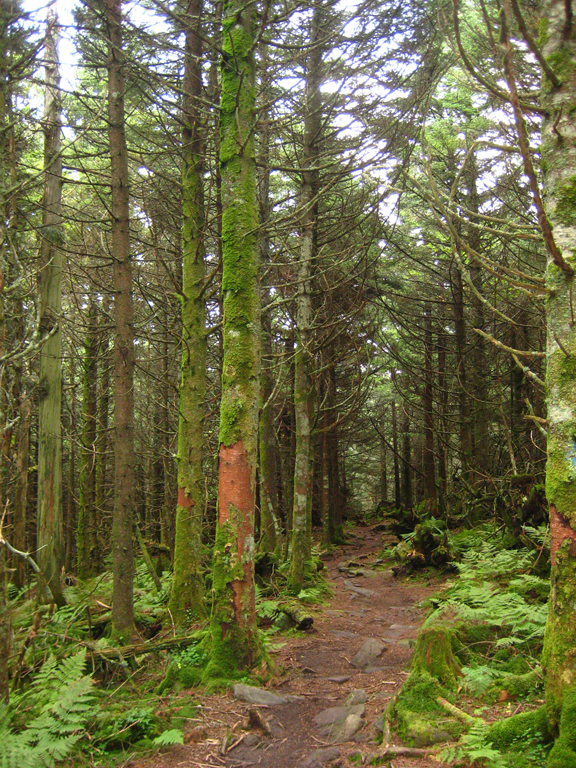
Mount Rogers - Spruce-Fir Forest

Frazer firs on the summit of Mt. Rogers are beginning to decline because of infestation by the balsam woolly adelgid, an exotic insect pest.

Streams in the area have been recognized for their high water quality. Wild natural trout streams in Virginia are classified by the Department of Game and Inland Fisheries by their water quality, with class i the highest and class iv the lowest. Lewis Fork is a class i stream and Charlies Branch, Daves Branch, Grindstone Branch and Helton Creek are class ii streams.

Grayson Highlands State Park, adjacent to the wilderness, contains balds, large open grassy areas at a high elevation with good views in many directions. Ponies have been introduced into the highlands and allowed to run wild while grazing the balds.

== Topography ==
Mount Rogers is a roundish knob with multiple ridges radiating in all directions. Wilburn Ridge, Cabin Ridge and Briar Ridge are on the south side of Pine Mountain, Elk Ridge is on the north side of Pine Mountain, and Elk Garden Ridge is on the west. Big Laurel Creek, the drainage on the west slope of Elk Ridge, is part of the Holston River watershed; and Lewis Fork, the drainage on the east slope of Elk Ridge, is part of the New River watershed.

The wilderness, in the Southern Blue Ridge Mountains Subsection within the Central Appalachian Broadleaf Coniferous Forest-Meadow Province, has elevations ranging from 3400 feet near Big Laurel Creek to 5700 feet on Mt Rogers. A tectonic uplift of the mountains created the many high gradient streams found in the area.

== Management ==
Designated by Congress in 1984, the wilderness now has a total of 6076 acres, and is managed by the Forest Service through the Mount Rogers National Recreation Area.

There are some regulations to maintain the integrity of the area as a wilderness. For example, motorized equipment, motor vehicles and mountain bikes are prohibited, group size is limited to ten people, and limits are placed on camping.

== Nearby Wild Areas ==
- Devil's Den-Ewing Mountain
- Horse Heaven (conservation area)
- Little Dry Run Wilderness Addition
- Shaw Gap
- Feathercamp
- Mount Rogers Crest Zone
- Whitetop Mountain (conservation area)
- Whitetop Laurel
- Rogers Ridge
- London Bridge Branch
- Beaverdam Creek (conservation area)

== See also ==
- Mount Rogers Cluster
- Wilderness
