= Little Dry Run Wilderness Addition =

Area in Virginia, USA

- Location within Virginia
- Location: Virginia, United States
- Coordinates: 36°46′12″N 81°14′11″W
- Area: 2,202 acres (8.91 km^{2})

Little Dry Run Wilderness Addition is a wildland in the George Washington and Jefferson National Forests of western Virginia that has been recognized by the Wilderness Society as a special place worthy of protection from logging and road construction. The Wilderness Society has designated the area as a "Mountain Treasure".

At 2202 acres, the area is almost as large as the adjacent Little Dry Run Wilderness, one of the most lightly used wilderness areas in the Mount Rogers National Recreation Area.

The area is part of the Mount Rogers Cluster.

== Location and access ==
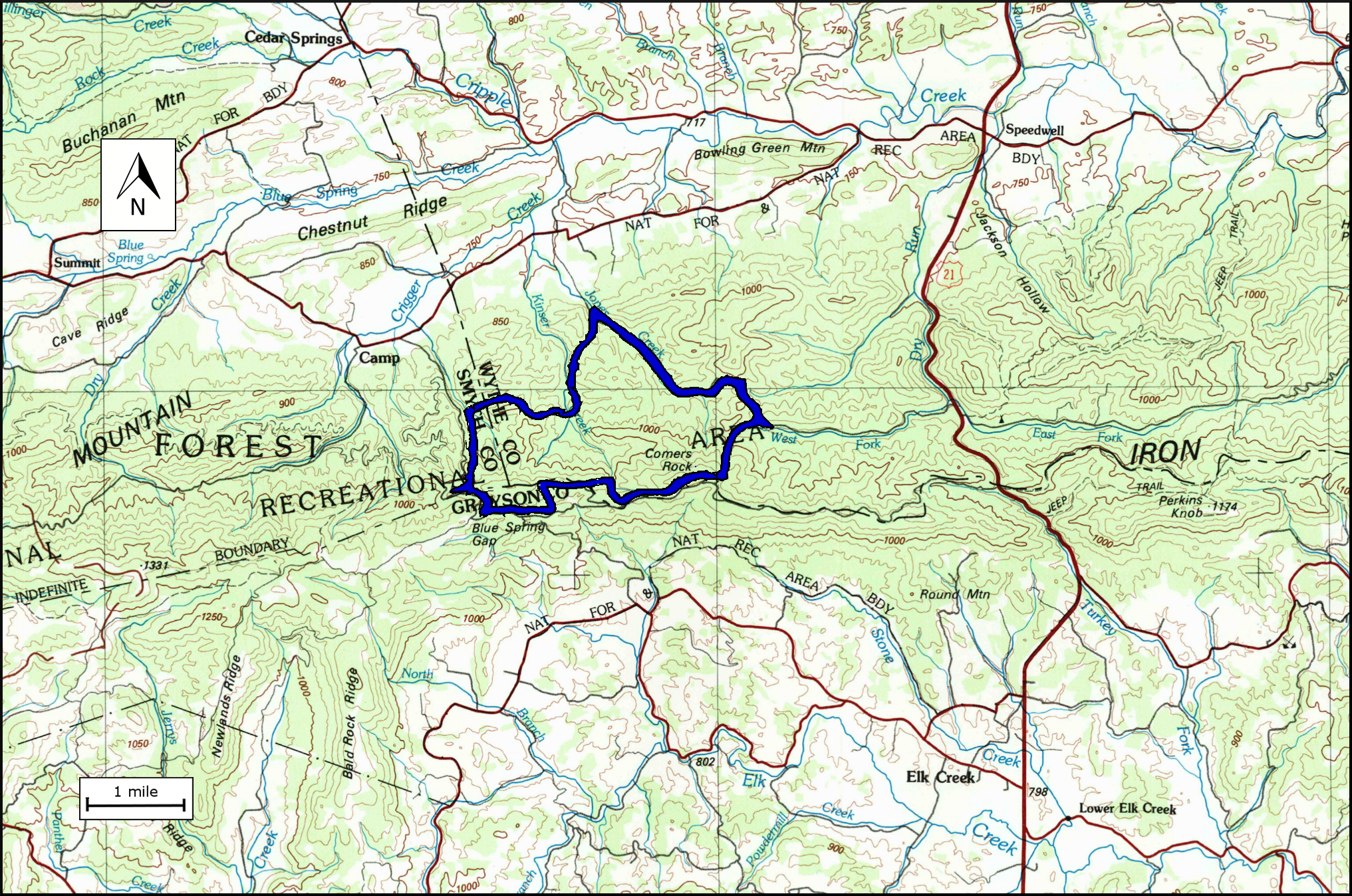
LittleDryRunVA Wytheville 188819 1982 100000Scaled geoArea

The area is located in the Appalachian Mountains of Southwestern Virginia about 8 miles west of Cripple Creek, Virginia, between Blue Springs Rd (Va 672) on the south, Dry Rd. (Va 612) on the north, Grayson Turnpike (US 21) on the west and Hale Lake Rd. (VA 798) on the east. It is on the south side of Little Dry Run Wilderness.

Trails and roads into the area include:

- Route 337, open seasonally
- The Iron Mountain Trail, adjacent to the area
- Little Dry Run Trail, 4.13 miles
- Virginia Highlands Horse Trail, FS 337, 82 miles
- Iron Mountain Trail, FS 301, 44.3 miles

Motorcycles are allowed on part of the Virginia Highlands Horse Trail from October 1 through April 1.

The boundary of the wildland as determined by the Wilderness Society is shown in the adjacent map. Additional roads and trails are given on National Geographic Map 786. A great variety of information, including topographic maps, aerial views, satellite data and weather information, is obtained by selecting the link with the wild land's coordinates in the upper right of this page.

Beyond maintained trails, old logging roads can be used to explore the area. The Appalachian Mountains were extensively timbered in the early twentieth century leaving logging roads that are becoming overgrown but still passable. Old logging roads and railroad grades can be located by consulting the historical topographic maps available from the United States Geological Survey (USGS). The Little Dry Run Wilderness Addition is covered by USGS topographic maps Speedwell and Cedar Springs.

== Natural history ==
The forest is composed mostly of broadleaf deciduous species with some yellow pine. About 1/3 of the area, with colluvial drainages, toeslopes and stream floodplains, has a rich habitat that supports yellow poplar, northern red oak, white oak, basswood, cucumber tree, white ash, eastern hemlock, and red maple. The remainder of the area, on the north and west slopes, contains white oak, northern red oak and hickory, and ridgetops and eastern slopes contain chestnut oak, scarlet oak and yellow pine. There are 77 acres of table mountain pine, one of Virginia's few remaining stands of pure table mountain pine. In addition there are mixed forests of table mountain pine and hardwoods. The proportion of table mountain pine and pitch pine, which require fire to reproduce, is diminishing because of fire suppression practices.

There are 128 acres of possible old growth forests; three small tracts south of Panther Knob and several along the border on Iron Mountain. And there is a small tract at least 140 years old. Ecological community types include 21 acres of Dry and Dry-Mesic Oak-Pine, 102 acres of Dry Mesic Oak, 4 acres of Mixed and Western Mesophytic, and 1 acre of Xeric Pine and Pine-oak.

The golden-crowned kinglet, associated with mature forests and rare in Virginia, is found in the area. Turkeys are featured species. There are about seven acres of maintained wildlife openings.

Streams in the area are recognized for their water quality. Wild natural trout streams in Virginia are classified by the Department of Game and Inland Fisheries by their water quality, with class i the highest and class iv the lowest. Kinser and Jones Creeks are class iii streams.

== Topography ==
As part of the Southern Blue Ridge Mountains Subsection within the Central Appalachian Broadleaf Coniferous Forest-Meadow Province, there are tectonic uplifted mountain ranges composed of igneous and metamorphic rock with many high gradient, deeply incised streams. Buzzard Rock and Panther Knob are dominant high points.

The area is drained by Kinser Creek, through the middle, and Jones Creek, on the north. Both streams flow into Cripple Creek, about three miles north of the area. Elevations range from 2540 feet on Jones Creek near the northern border, to 4000 feet near the summit of Comers Rock, a prominent high point to the southeast.

== Forest Service management ==
The Forest Service has conducted a survey of their lands to determine the potential for wilderness designation. Wilderness designation provides a high degree of protection from development. The areas that were found suitable are referred to as inventoried roadless areas. Later a Roadless Rule was adopted that limited road construction in these areas. The rule provided some degree of protection by reducing the negative environmental impact of road construction and thus promoting the conservation of roadless areas. The area was inventoried in the roadless area review, and therefore protected from possible road construction and timber sales.

Hale Lake and Comers Rock Campground are recreational resources adjacent to the area. On the south, Hale Lake, a five-acre lake built in the 1960s, has a one-mile loop trail and parking for 20 vehicles. Comers Rock Campground, on the southeastern border with ten camp sites, is 0.5 miles from the Comers Rock overlook, an observation platform with a "dramatic" 360 degree view of the surroundings.

== Cultural history ==
A survey for cultural resources within 151 acres of the area found two prehistoric transient camps and a historic cabin complex. There is a potential for additional historic resources. An old road into the area, in the southwest corner, was used to access several old cabins 0.5 miles from the boundary. Only the foundations of the cabins remain, as well as an open 20 foot by 20 foot concrete reservoir that supplied water to the cabins.
