= Little Wilson Creek Wilderness =

Wilderness area in Virginia, United States

- IUCN category Ib (wilderness area)
- Location within Virginia
- Location: Grayson County Virginia, United States
- Nearest city: Abingdon, Virginia
- Coordinates: 36.6525°N 81.4650°W
- Area: 5,461 acres (2,210 ha)
- Established: 1984
- Administrator: U.S. Forest Service

The Little Wilson Creek Wilderness is an area in the Mount Rogers National Recreation Area protected by the Eastern Wilderness Act of Congress to maintain its present, natural condition. As part of the wilderness system, it is intended to preserve a variety of natural life forms and contribute to a diversity of plant and animal gene pools. Over half of the ecosystems in the United States exist within designated wildernesses.

The area sits atop a high shelf nearly 4,800 feet above sea level. With a dozen streams flowing into tributaries of the New River, the wilderness contains unique natural communities, one of which is recognized by the Virginia Natural Heritage for its unusual plants. Little Wilson Creek Wilderness is one of the most popular wilderness areas in Virginia.

The area is part of the Mount Rogers Cluster.

== Location and access ==
The wilderness is on the southeast side of the Mount Rogers National Recreation Area near the town of Troutdale in Grayson County, Virginia, northeast of Grayson Highlands State Park.

Boundary of Little Wilson Creek Wilderness

Trails in the area include:

- Appalachian Trail; a 1.3 mile section of the Appalachian Trail passes through the southwest section of the wilderness with access from the Scales Trail on the north and Grayson Highlands State Park on the south.
- Bearpen Trail, FS 4525, 3.3 miles, moderate, no blazes, accessed from the Scales Trail
- Big Wilson Creek Trail, FS 4607, 1.9 miles, difficult, no blazes, accessed from the Bearpen Trail and Grayson Highlands State Park
- First Peak Trail, FS 4524, 3.1 miles, moderate, no blazes, accessed from the Appalachian Trail near Scales
- Hightree Rock Trail, FS 4522, 4.9 miles, moderate no blazes, trailhead on Forest Service Road 4104
- Jackie Street Trail, FS 4608, 2.5 miles, moderate, no blazes, trailhead on Forest Service Road 4103
- Kabel Trail, FS 4606, 2.5 miles, moderate, no blazes, connects to Big Wilson Creek Trail and Hightree Trail
- Little Wilson Trail, FS 4594, 1.5 miles, moderate, no blazes, accessed from Briar Run Lane, State Route 817
- Scales Trail, FS 4523, 1.3 miles, moderate, no blazes, accessed from Scales, a place at the end of forest service road 613 where cattle were corralled and weighed after a summer in the high country pastures
- Switchback Trail, FS 4520, 1.4 miles, moderate, no blazes, trailhead on Forest Service Road 613
- Third Peak Trail, FS 4521, 1.7 miles, difficult, no blazes, trailhead on Forest Service Road 613

== Natural history ==
Besides the usual oak-hickory forest, the area contains yellow birch, beech, and sugar maple with some Frazer magnolia, and a spruce-fir forest at higher elevations. Other trees include white oak, northern red oak, basswood, cucumber tree, white ash, eastern hemlock and red maple. A conifer/northern hardwood forest, above 4400 feet on Third Peak, contains American beech, yellow birch, sugar maple, mountain maple, striped maple and red spruce. The timber is mostly 21–100 years old since much of the area was cut and burned in the early part of the 20th century, however some old growth forest remains. State route 613 along the western border was the grade for the railroad used to bring timber from the area.

Deer, bear, grouse and quail are found in the area. The hermit thrush is common, although regarded as extremely rare in Virginia. Other Appalachian species include the northern flying squirrel and over 21 species of salamanders.

The rare Blue Ridge St. John's-wort and long-stalked holly are found in the area. Other rare plants include the finely-nerved sedge, three seed sedge, northern long sedge and Michaux bluet. The marsh speedwell was once identified, but its present status is uncertain.

Part of the Little Wilson Creek Headwaters Special Biological Area is in the wilderness.

== Topography ==
The wilderness area is within the watershed of the New River and has elevations ranging from 3220 feet on the south to 4857 feet on the north. The wilderness is part of the Southern Blue Ridge Mountains Subsection within the Central Appalachian Broadleaf Coniferous Forest-Meadow Province. A tectonic uplift of the mountains in the wilderness created many high gradient streams.

Little Wilson Creek, beginning on the southeastern slope of Pine Mountain in a bog containing many rare plants, flows southeast through the wilderness into Wilson Creek, which defines the border between the wilderness and Grayson Highlands State Park. The northeastern part of the wilderness is drained by Mill Creek and Solomon’s Branch, both flowing into Fox Creek. Solomon’s Branch has a forty-foot waterfall.

First Peak, Second Peak and Third Peak on the eastern edge of Pine Mountain are in the center of the wilderness. Bearpen Ridge extends from Pine Mountain to the south of the wilderness. Most of the area in the wilderness is above 4000 feet with large grassy balds.

== Management ==
Designated by Congress in 1984, the wilderness now has a total of 5461 acres and is managed by the Forest Service through the Mount Rogers National Recreation Area.

There are some regulations to maintain the integrity of the area as a wilderness. For example, motorized equipment, motor vehicles and mountain bikes are prohibited; group size is limited to ten people; and limits are placed on camping.

== See also ==
- Mount Rogers Cluster
- Wilderness
