= Rogers Ridge =

Wildland in Virginia and Tennessee

- Location within Virginia
- Location: Virginia, Tennessee, United States
- Coordinates: 36°36′50″N 81°40′26″W
- Area: 5,255 acres (21.27 km^{2})

Rogers Ridge, a wildland in the George Washington and Jefferson National Forests of western Virginia and the Cherokee National Forest of eastern Tennessee, has been recognized by the Wilderness Society as a special place worthy of protection from logging and road construction. The Wilderness Society has designated the area as a "Mountain Treasure".

High grassy ridges offer views of mountain ranges to the north and south; balds on Rogers Ridge are among the most extensive in the Southern Appalachians; and Gentry Creek has 30-foot waterfalls that cascade over high rock walls to pools below. With few midstory trees, tall trees with ground vegetation combine to give the hiker an experience of an openwoods atmosphere.

The area is part of the Mount Rogers Cluster.

== Location and access ==
The area is located in the Appalachian Mountains of Southwestern Virginia and Eastern Tennessee, about 2 miles east of Laurel Bloomery, Tennessee and 4 miles southwest of Konnarock, Virginia. It is bounded by Gentry Creek Rd. (Forest Road 123) on the south, private lands to the west and east, and Va 726 on the north.

Trails into the area include:

- Gentry Creek Falls Trail, FS 51, 2.6 miles
- Rogers Ridge Horse Trail, FS 192, 5.8 miles

Road access into the area is provided by Va 124.

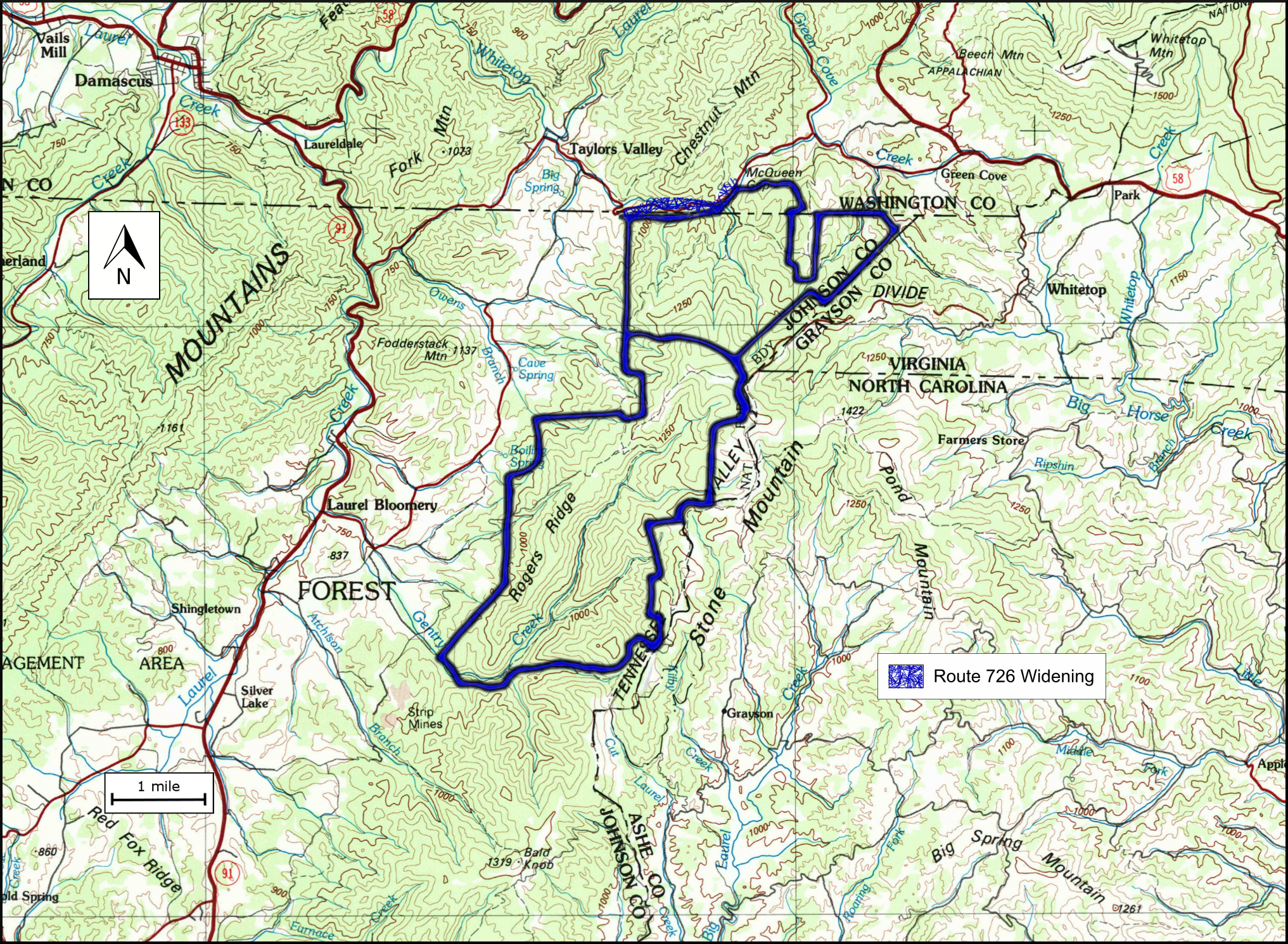
Boundary of the Rogers Ridge wild area as identified by the Wilderness Society.

The boundary of the wildland as determined by the Wilderness Society is shown in the adjacent map. Additional roads and trails are given on National Geographic Maps 783 (Mount Rogers). and Map 783 (South Holston and Watauga Lakes) A great variety of information, including topographic maps, aerial views, satellite data and weather information, is obtained by selecting the link with the wild land's coordinates in the upper right of this page.

== Natural history ==
A variety of wildflowers include the rare Silverling, Robbins ragwort, Rock skullcap, Roan rattlesnake root, Fraser's sedge, Mountain bitter cress, Appalchian twayblade, Rosy twisted stalk and Minnie bush. The site contains mountain bogs and two stands of old growth forests.

The last authenticated siting of an eastern cougar occurred here.

The section of the area in the Cherokee National Forest has five streams with trout populations; Gentry Creek has rainbow trout and brook trout; Grindstone Branch has rainbow and brook; Cut Laurel Branch, rainbow and brook; Kate Branch, rainbow and brook; Richardson Branch, brook trout; and Whetstone Branch with brook trout. Brook trout is considered a native species.

Valley Creek in the Virginia part of the area is recognized by Virginia for its water quality. Wild natural trout streams in Virginia are classified by the Department of Game and Inland Fisheries by their water quality, with class i the highest and class iv the lowest. Valley Creek is a class iii trout stream.

== Topography ==
With elevations ranging from 2600 feet in the lower drainages to 4880 feet, Rogers Ridge is a mountain ridge divided by small steep sideslope drainages.

== Forest Service management ==
The Forest Service has conducted a survey of their lands to determine the potential for wilderness designation. Wilderness designation provides a high degree of protection from development. The areas that were found suitable are referred to as inventoried roadless areas. Later a Roadless Rule was adopted that limited road construction in these areas. The rule provided some degree of protection by reducing the negative environmental impact of road construction and thus promoting the conservation of roadless areas. Rogers Ridge was inventoried in the roadless area review, and therefore protected from possible road construction and timber sales.

The forest service classifies areas under their management by a recreational opportunity setting that informs visitors of the diverse range of opportunities available in the forest. The area within the Jefferson National Forest has a "Scenic Area" prescription.

The center of the area in the Cherokee National Forest has 3865 acres designated as the Rogers Ridge Scenic Area. The remaining area is designated Remote Back-country-Few Roads.
