= Pine Mountain (Grayson County, Virginia) =

Mountain in Virginia, United States

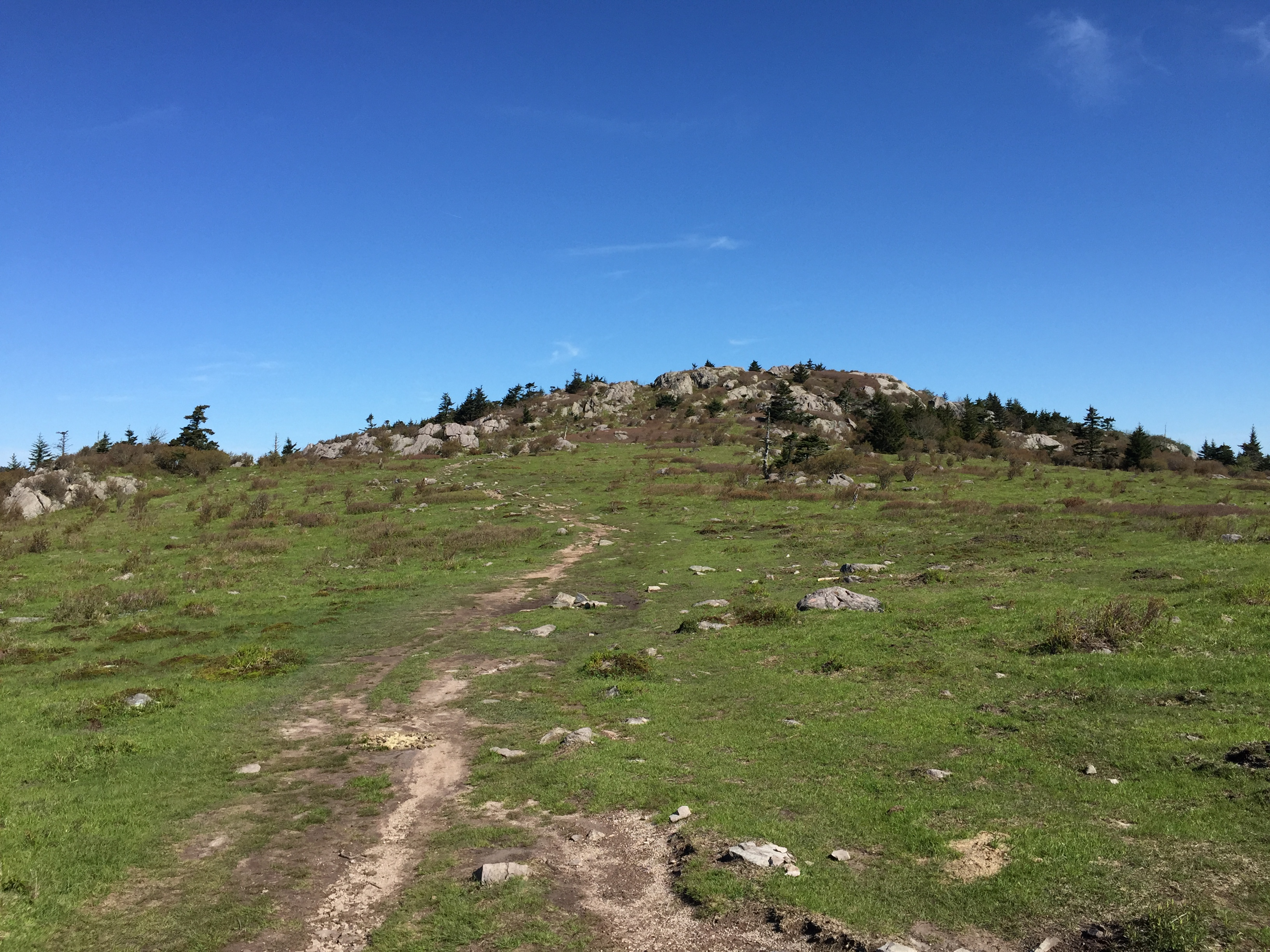
- The mostly treeless summit of Pine Mountain

Highest point
- Elevation: 5,526 ft (1,684 m)
- Prominence: 126 ft (38 m)
- Coordinates: 36°39′26″N 81°31′17″W

Geography
- Location within Virginia
- Location: Mount Rogers National Recreation Area, Grayson County, Virginia, U.S.
- Parent range: Blue Ridge Mountains
- Topo map: White Top

Pine Mountain is a mountain in the Blue Ridge Mountains. It is located in the Mount Rogers National Recreation Area of the Jefferson National Forest, within Grayson County, Virginia, United States. The peak is immediately east of the highest mountain of Virginia, Mount Rogers, and Pine Mountain's sparsely vegetated summit has excellent views of both Mount Rogers and the surrounding region. The Appalachian Trail passes within feet of the summit. Pine Mountain is the second highest named summit in Virginia, though because its topographic prominence is well under 300 feet, it is considered a subsidiary peak of Mount Rogers.

== Summit panorama ==
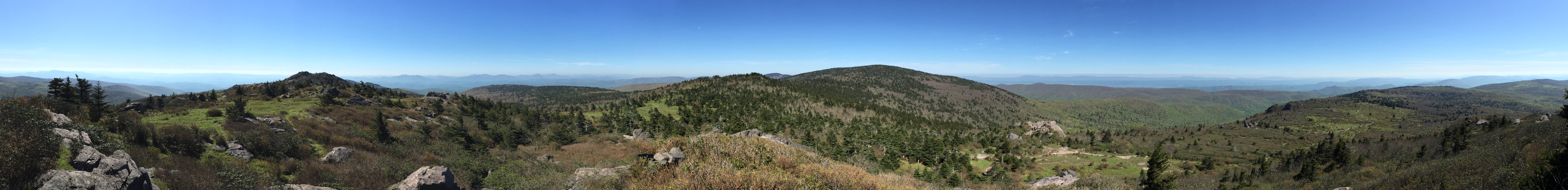
360-degree panorama from the summit of Pine Mountain
