= Raccoon Branch Wilderness =

Wilderness area in Virginia, United States

- IUCN category Ib (wilderness area)
- Location within Virginia
- Location: Smyth County Virginia, United States
- Nearest city: Abingdon, Virginia
- Coordinates: 36.73596°N 81.47344°W
- Area: 4,225 acres (1,710 ha)
- Established: 2009
- Administrator: U.S. Forest Service

The Raccoon Branch Wilderness is an area in the Mount Rogers National Recreation Area protected by the Eastern Wilderness Act of Congress to maintain its present, natural condition. As part of the wilderness system, it is intended to preserve a variety of natural life forms and contribute to a diversity of plant and animal gene pools. Over half of the ecosystems in the United States exist within designated wilderness.

Crossed by well-maintained trails and drained by several cold-water streams, the wilderness offers good opportunity for both hikers and fishermen who want to experience one of the newest additions to Virginia's wilderness areas.

The area is part of the Mount Rogers Cluster.

== Location and Access ==
The wilderness is located in the northwest corner of the Mount Rogers Recreation Area, near the town of Sugar Grove in Smyth County. It is bounded on the east by Va 16 and on the west by SR 650. The northern boundary is about 2 miles south of VA 672.

Trails in the area include:

- The Appalachian Trail, about 4.5 miles of the trail crosses the wilderness, with trailheads at SR 672 on the north and SR 650 on the south
- The Virginia Highlands Trail, FS 337, 4 miles, moderate, orange blazes, trailhead VA 16 on west and SR 650 on the south
- Dickey Knob Trail, FS 346, 2.3 miles, difficult, no blazes, trailhead on Va 16
- Mullins Branch Trail, FS 4513, 2.5 miles, difficult, no blazes, trailhead of SR 601
- Bobbys Trail, FS 4514, 0.8 moderate, blue blazes, trailhead on Virginia Highlands Trail
- Hickory Ridge Trail, FS 4516, 0.6 difficult, no blazes, trailheads SR 650
- Raccoon Branch NatureTrail, FS 4610, 0.2 miles, easy, blue blazed, Va 16

The Hurricane and Raccoon Branch campgrounds are just outside the wilderness.

== Natural history ==
Trees found in the wilderness include red oak, white oak, scarlet oak, chestnut oak, shagbark hickory, white ash, Fraser fir in the highlands, tuliptrees, basswood, cucumber tree, striped maple, walnuts, and hemlocks in forest valleys. There are a possible 268 acres of inventoried old growth trees

Flowers include painted trillium, small purple-fringed orchids, black cohosh, broad beech ferns. Squawroot, a parasite plant that feeds on oak roots, provides early spring food for bears emerging from hibernation. Rare Appalachian club moss (Huperzia appalachiana) and, five-rowed peat moss (Sphagnum quinquefanum), locally rare, are also found.

Wildlife include the rare Nelson's early black stonefly and, rare in Virginia, yellow bellied sapsucker.

As part of the Holston River watershed, the wilderness supports habitat for two endangered mussels, the Tennessee pigtoe mussel and the Tennessee heelsplitter

The rare black sculpin (Cottus baileyi) is found in the wilderness streams.

== Topography ==
As part of the Southern Blue Ridge Mountains Subsection within the Central Appalachian Broadleaf Coniferous Forest-Meadow Province, the area is composed of uplifted mountain ranges of igneous and metamorphic rock. The wilderness is rugged, with elevations ranging from about 2,580 feet along VA 650 in the northwest corner to 4,000 feet on Dickey Ridge. Ridges, capped by lower resistant Cambrian quartzite, have worn away creating large variations in elevation with many high gradient, deeply incised streams.

Two long ridges, Dickey Ridge and Bobbys Ridge, run through the area with two peaks on Dickey Ridge, High Point (4,019 feet) and Dicky Knob (3,606 feet)).

There is a 300 foot high rock slide area on the eastern boundary, now stabilized with small pines beginning to grow.

The wilderness includes the full watershed of Raccoon Branch and Scott Branch, tributaries of Dickey Creek. Other small streams, including Scott Branch, Shanty Branch, Muddy Branch, Slabtree Branch, Mullins Branch, Russell Hollow and Wildcat Branch, all flow from the wilderness in different directions to eventually reach the Holston River. On the boundary of the wilderness is Dickey Creek to the east and southwest, and Comers Creek to the southwest and west.

== Management ==
Designated by Congress in 2009 with a total of 4,225 acres, the wilderness is managed by the United States Forest Service through the Mount Rogers National Recreation Area.

There are some regulations to maintain the integrity of the area as a wilderness. For example, motorized equipment, motor vehicles and mountain bikes are prohibited, group size is limited to ten people, and limits are placed on camping.

== See also ==
- Mount Rogers Cluster
- Wilderness
