= Seng Mountain National Scenic Area =

Protected area in Smyth County, Virginia

- Location within the United States Location within Virginia
- Location: Smyth County, Virginia, USA
- Nearest city: Marion, Virginia
- Coordinates: 36°43′00″N 81°35′00″W
- Area: 6,466 acres (26.17 km^{2})
- Established: 2009
- Governing body: U.S. Forest Service

Seng Mountain National Scenic Area is a federally designated National Scenic Area within Mount Rogers National Recreation Area in Smyth County, Virginia, USA. The 6,455-acre (2,612 ha) scenic area is administered by the U.S. Forest Service as part of Jefferson National Forest. Mountains and ridges within the scenic area include Seng Mountain, Chestnut Ridge, Round Top, Double Top and Chestnut Ridge, all portions of the Iron Mountain system within the upper drainage of the South Fork of the Holston River. The scenic area includes Rowland Creek Falls, a campground and a picnic area.

The National Scenic Area was established by Public Law 111-11, the Omnibus Public Land Management Act of 2009.

The area is part of the Mount Rogers Cluster.
