= Whitetop Laurel =

Wildland in Washington County, Virginia, US

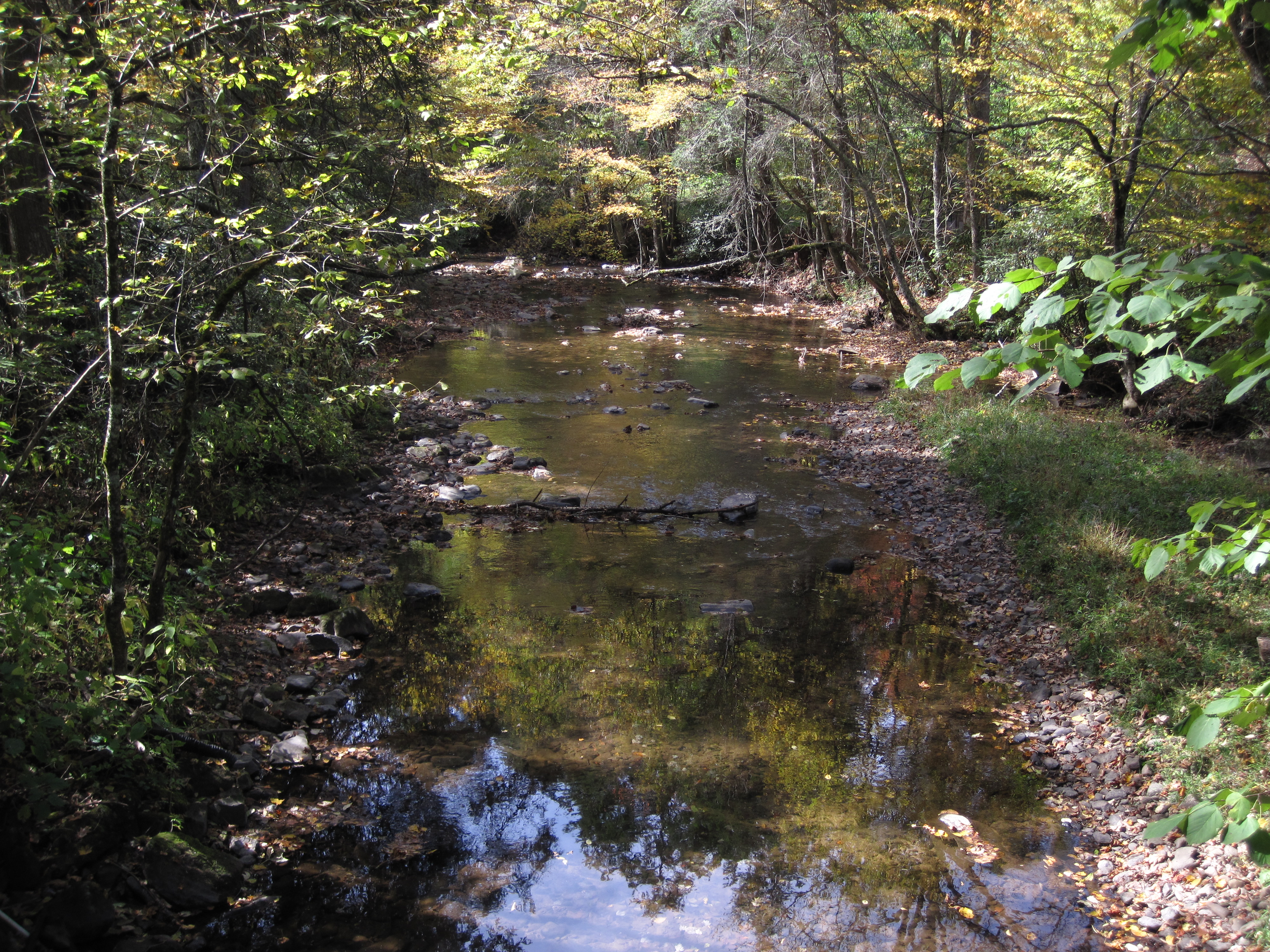
- Whitetop Laurel Creek, October 2016

- Location within Virginia
- Location: Washington County, Virginia, Virginia, United States
- Coordinates: 36°38′10″N 81°42′30″W
- Area: 3,483 acres (14.10 km^{2})

Whitetop Laurel is a wildland in the George Washington and Jefferson National Forests of western Virginia that has been recognized by the Wilderness Society as a special place worthy of protection from logging and road construction. The Wilderness Society has designated the area as a "Mountain Treasure".

The Appalachian Trail and Virginia Creeper Trail follow Whitetop Laurel Creek through a gorge with rich cove hardwood forests and thick rhododendrons. The area is one of the most popular recreational hubs in the Mount Rogers National Recreation Area. Whitetop Laurel Creek is a popular wild trout stream with wildlife viewing platforms and streamside access by wheelchair.

The area is part of the Mount Rogers Cluster.

== Location and access ==
The area is located in the Appalachian Mountains of Southwestern Virginia about 4.2 miles east of Damascus, Virginia between Va 859 (Grassy Ridge Road) on the east, US 58 on the north, and Va 726 (Chestnut Mountain Road) on the south. It lies on the east side of the Feathercamp wild area.

The Appalachian Trail extends for 9.2 miles through the area, entering from Va 859 on the east and exiting onto US 58 on the west.

The Virginia Creeper Trail, a 34-mile trail following an old railroad grade, is used by horse-back riders, bicyclers and hikers. From Abingdon, it runs to Whitetop, Virginia near the North Carolina border. The original railroad carried lumber from Konnarock, Va where a sawmill employing more than 400 workers with 20 logging camps produced more than 15 million board feet of lumber annually. Little remains of the sawmill, which operated from 1906 to 1928.

Other trails into the area include:

- Chestnut Mountain Trail, FS 4566, 2.4 miles, has been decommissioned
- Taylors Valley Trail, FS 4555, 2.6 miles
- Saunders Trail, FS 4628, 2.1 miles

Parker Road also provides access to the area.

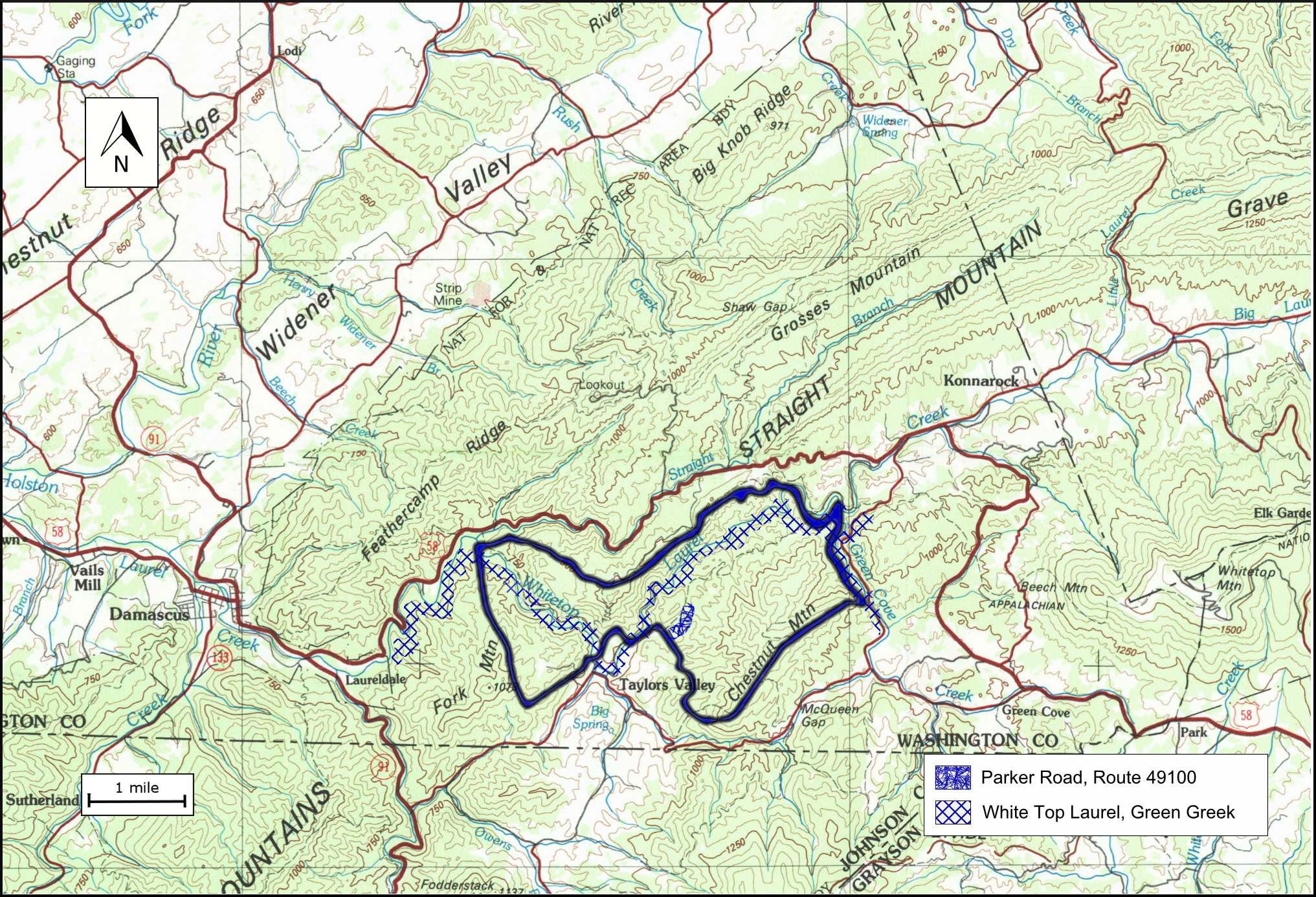
Boundary of the Whitetop Laurel wild area as identified by the Wilderness Society.

The boundary of the wildland as determined by the Wilderness Society is shown in the adjacent map. Additional roads and trails are given on National Geographic Maps 786 (Mount Rogers). and Map 318 (Mount Rogers High Country)

A great variety of information, including topographic maps, aerial views, satellite data and weather information, is obtained by selecting the link with the wild land's coordinates in the upper right of this page. Beyond maintained trails, old logging roads can be used to explore the area. The Appalachian Mountains were extensively timbered in the early twentieth century leaving logging roads that are becoming overgrown but still passable. Old logging roads and railroad grades can be located by consulting the historical topographic maps available from the United States Geological Survey (USGS). The Whitetop Laurel wild area is covered by USGS topographic maps Konnarock and Grayson.

== Natural history ==
Whitetop Laurel Creek provides habitat for many unusual and threatened wildlife. These include the greenfin darter, the sharphead darter, the fatlips minnow, and the hellbender, the largest salamander found in the U. S. Unusual flora includes the umbrella leaf and the streambank mock-orange, and possibly the Carolina saxifrage. There may be 150 acres of old growth forest.

About 2.7 miles of Whitetop Laurel Creek is classified as an "Exceptional State Water" thus protecting its water quality from new or increased point source discharges.

== Topography ==
As part of the Southern Blue Ridge Mountains Subsection within the Central Appalachian Broadleaf Coniferous Forest-Meadow Province, there are tectonic uplifted mountain ranges composed of igneous and metamorphic rock with many high gradient, deeply incised streams. Whitetop Laurel Slopes is a special biological area with underlying calcium bearing rocks that supports a fertile forest ecosystem. Parts of Whitetop Laurel Creek and Green Cove Creek pass through geological formations composed of tillite and rhythmite, rare sedimentary rocks associated with past glacial activity.

== Forest Service management ==
The Forest Service has conducted a survey of their lands to determine the potential for wilderness designation. Wilderness designation provides a high degree of protection from development. The areas that were found suitable are referred to as inventoried roadless areas. Later a Roadless Rule was adopted that limited road construction in these areas. The rule provided some degree of protection by reducing the negative environmental impact of road construction and thus promoting the conservation of roadless areas. Whitetop Laurel was not inventoried in the roadless area review, and therefore not protected from possible road construction and timber sales.

The forest service classifies areas under their management by a recreational opportunity setting that informs visitors of the diverse range of opportunities available in the forest. Most of the area is part of the "Whitetop Laurel Special Area". On the south there are two areas designated as "Mix of Successional Habitat".
