= Mount Rogers =

Highest point in Virginia, United States

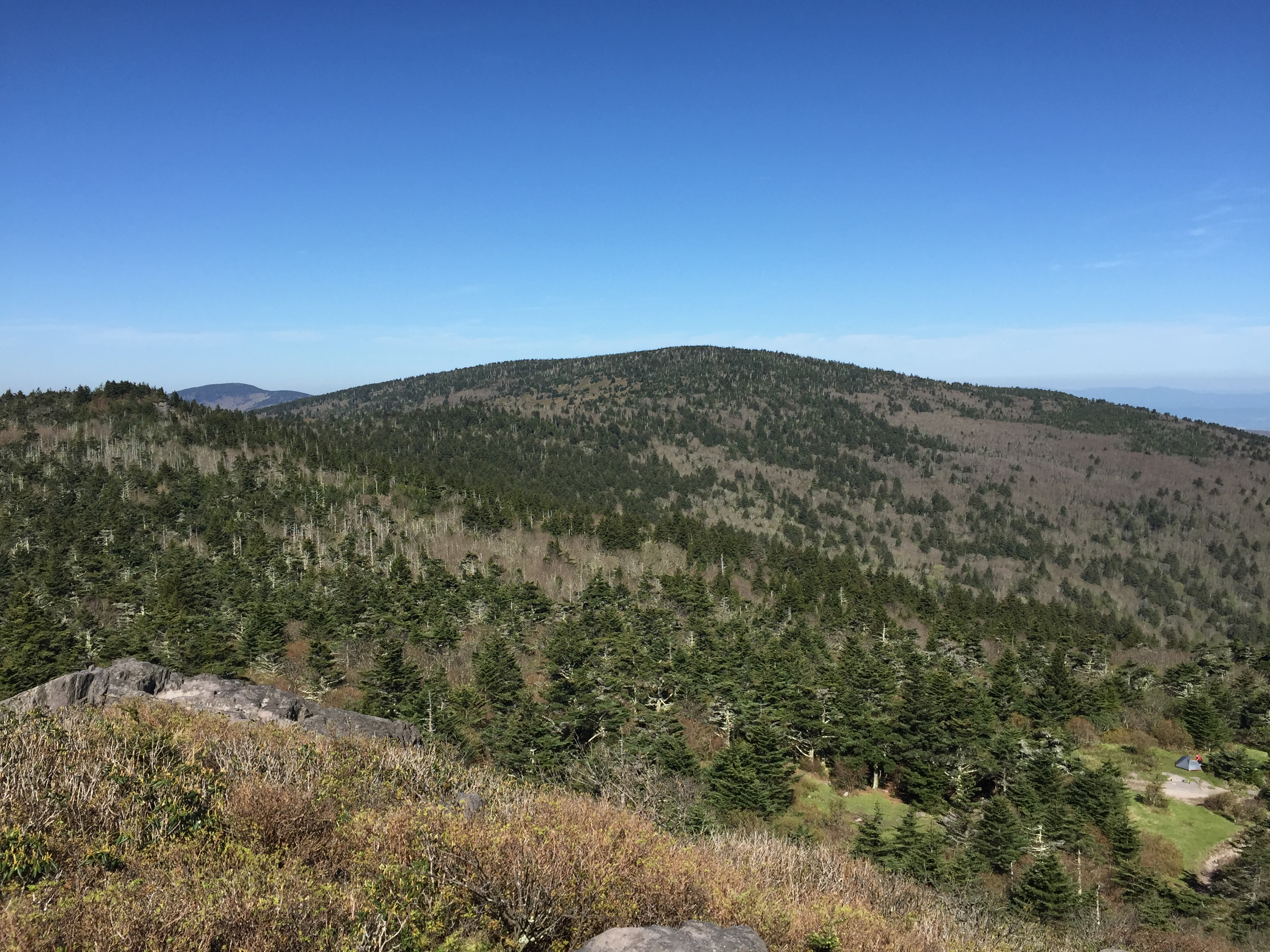
- View of Mount Rogers from Pine Mountain

Highest point
- Elevation: 5,729 ft (1,746 m)
- Prominence: 2,449 ft (746 m)
- Listing: U.S. state high point 19th
- Coordinates: 36°39′35″N 81°32′40″W

Geography
- Location within Virginia
- Location: Grayson County, Virginia; Smyth County, Virginia
- Parent range: Blue Ridge Mountains
- Topo map: USGS Whitetop Mountain

Geology
- Rock age: 760 Ma.
- Mountain type: Extinct stratovolcano complex

Climbing
- Easiest route: Hike via Appalachian Trail spur

Mount Rogers is the highest natural point in Virginia, United States, with a summit elevation of 5,729 ft (1,746 m) above mean sea level. The summit straddles the border of Grayson and Smyth Counties, Virginia, about 6.45 mi (10.38 km) WSW of Troutdale, Virginia. Most of the mountain is contained within the Lewis Fork Wilderness, while the entire area is part of the Mount Rogers National Recreation Area, which itself is a part of the Jefferson National Forest.

The mountain is named for William Barton Rogers, a Virginian educated at the College of William & Mary, who taught at William & Mary and the University of Virginia, became Virginia's first State Geologist, and went on to found the Massachusetts Institute of Technology.

The summit is most easily accessed from Grayson Highlands State Park by following the Appalachian Trail southbound for 3.5 mi (5.6 km) to a blue-blazed trail leading to the summit, which is covered by trees and marked with four National Geodetic Survey triangulation station disks; a standard station disk marked with an equilateral triangle and three standard reference disks marked with arrows pointing towards the station disk. One reference disk has been obscured by dense overgrowth. Because the Appalachian Trail passes within a half mile of the summit, the area is especially popular with hikers.

== Geology ==
The Mount Rogers area contains a unique record of the geohistory of Virginia. There is evidence from the rocks that volcanoes were part of the landscape. Roughly 760 million years ago, rift-related (divergent) volcanoes erupted along the axis of what later became the Appalachians, and one remnant of that volcanic zone, with its volcanic rocks, still can be seen at Mount Rogers. Massive rhyolite lava flows erupted at the mountain during the Precambrian rifting event. Mount Rogers is also the only place in Virginia that preserves evidence of ancient Proterozoic glaciation.

== Spruce-fir forests ==
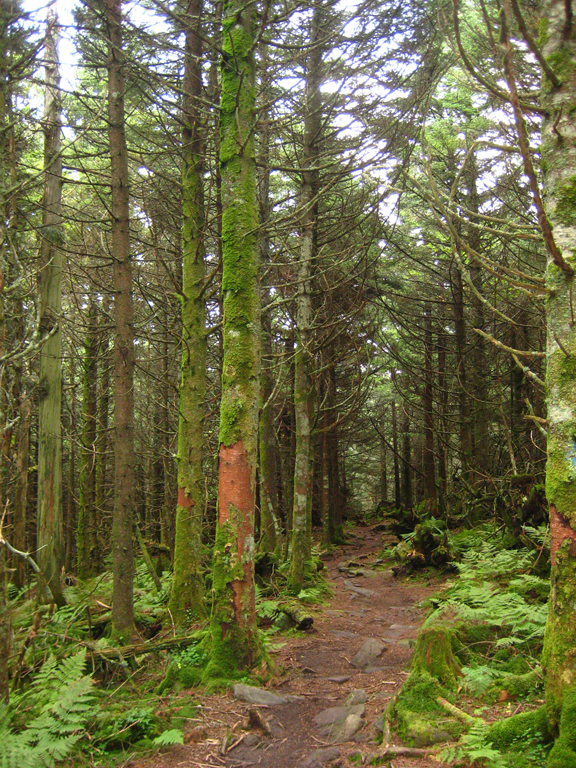
Forest of red spruce and Fraser fir on the slopes of Mount Rogers

Mount Rogers is the northernmost habitat of the high-altitude Southern Appalachian spruce-fir forests, which are found in only five other locations in the United States: the Great Smoky Mountains, the Black Mountains, the Great Balsam Mountains, Grandfather Mountain, and Roan Mountain. This forest type is one of the few remaining habitats of the Fraser fir, which is found only at high elevations, typically above 5,500 ft (1,700 m), in the southern Appalachian Mountains.

These forests have suffered recent declines due to infestations by the balsam woolly adelgid (Adelges piceae), a non-native insect that originated in Europe. It first infested Mount Rogers in 1962 and the entire U.S. population of Fraser firs suffered a 67% mortality rate since, although Mount Rogers was not affected as severely as other locations.

Some researchers have proposed that air pollution in the form of nitrogen and sulfur compounds originating from power plants has been a source of stress to the Fraser firs, resulting in an increased susceptibility to the balsam woolly adelgid, but this relationship has not been confirmed.

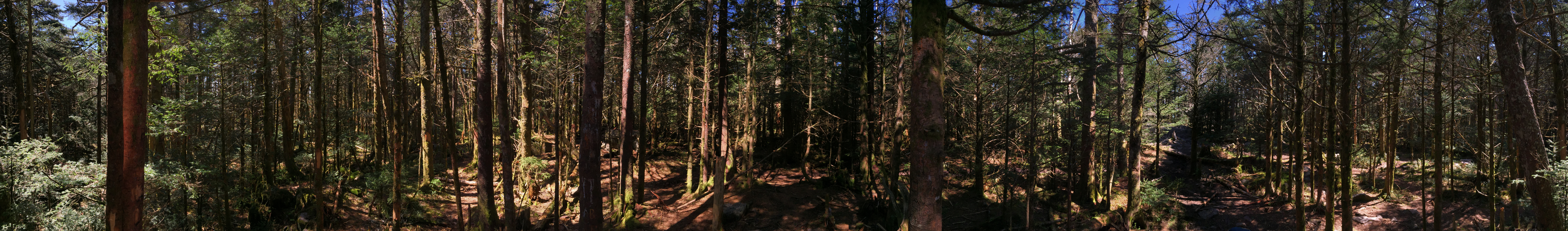
360-degree panorama from the summit of Mount Rogers

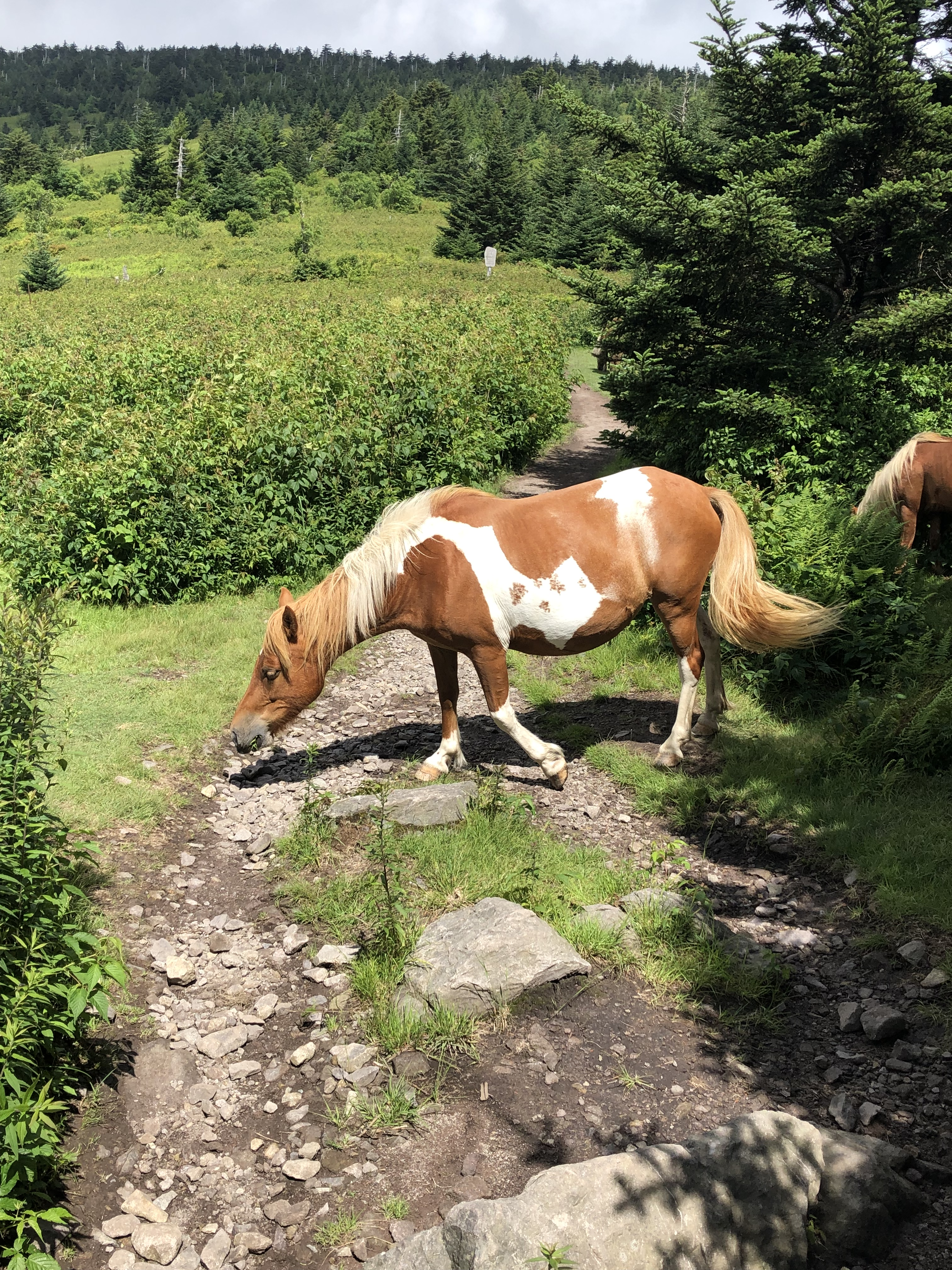
Wild ponies near Mount Rogers

== Wild ponies ==
Mount Rogers and the surrounding area is home to around 100 wild ponies, one of the few places in the United States where they live in the wild. According to Smithsonian Magazine, the ponies have lived in the area since the 1940s. In 1974, the Wilburn Ridge Pony Association was formed to help manage the herd and maintain the grassy area where they graze.

== See also ==
- High Knob
- Mount Rogers Cluster
- Mount Rogers National Recreation Area
- Reddish Knob
- Whitetop Mountain
