= Devil's Den-Ewing Mountain =

Protected area in Virginia, United States

- Location within Virginia
- Location: Virginia, United States
- Coordinates: 36°48′19″N 81°2′25″W
- Area: 7,320 acres (29.6 km^{2})

Devil's Den-Ewing Mountain is a wildland in the George Washington and Jefferson National Forests of western Virginia that has been recognized by the Wilderness Society as a special place worthy of protection from logging and road construction. The Wilderness Society has designated the area as a "Mountain Treasure".

Ewing Mountain, a range extending across the area, includes Devil's Den on the west and Chestnut Knob on the east. Raven Cliff, a unique geological site on the north., is the home of ravens, ospreys and other birdlife.

The area is part of the Mount Rogers Cluster.

== Location and access ==
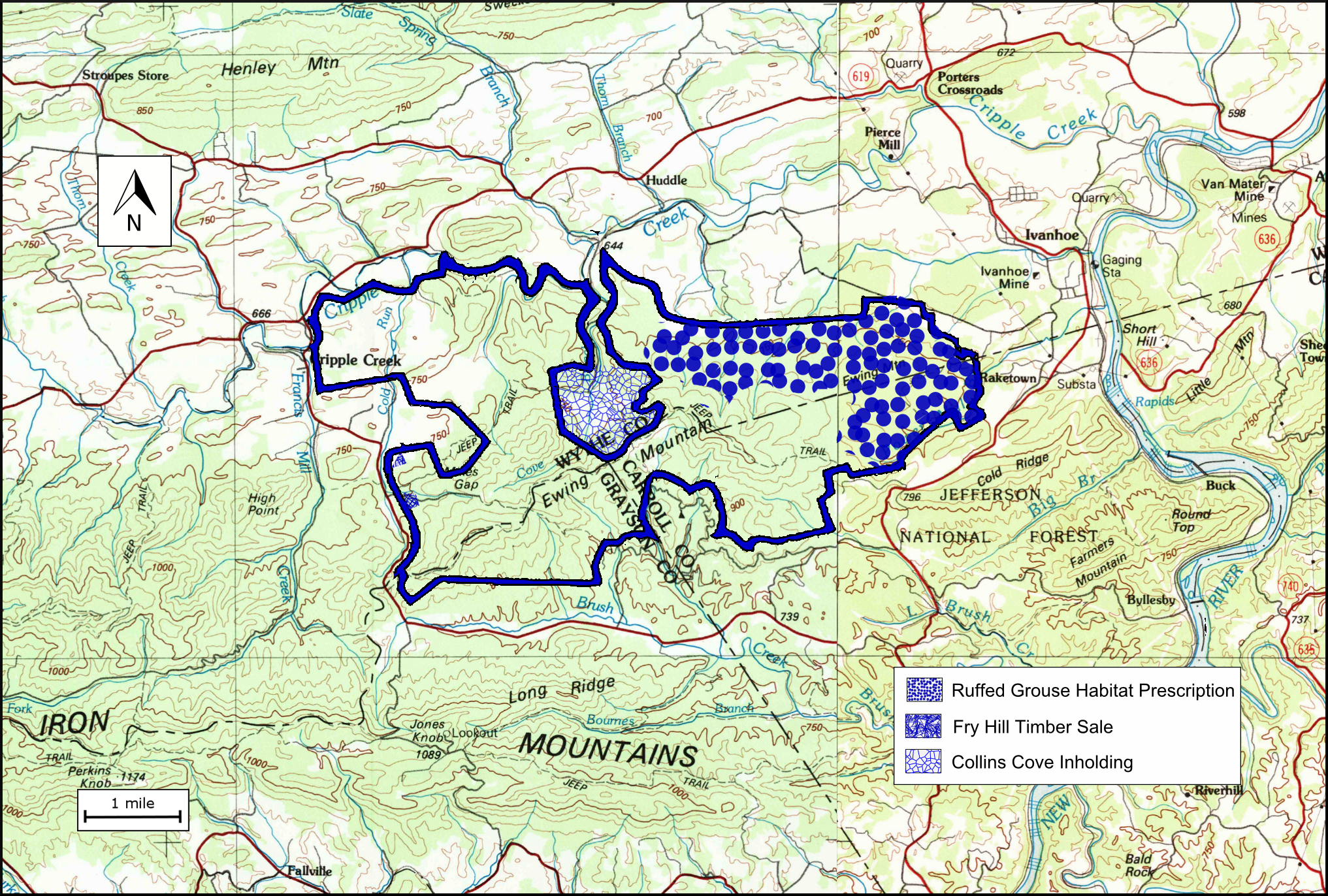
Boundary of the Devil's Den – Ewing Mountain wildland in the Jefferson National Forest as identified by the Wilderness Society.

The area is located in the Appalachian Mountains of Southwestern Virginia about 3 miles east of Cripple Creek, Virginia, between Va 602 on the west and south, and Va 94 on the east and Va 642 on the north.

Trails and roads into the area include:

- Ewing Mountain Road, FS 49780
- Cripple Creed Rd., FS 49710
- Raven Cliff Horse Camp Road, FS 4052B
- Barker Road, FS 49790
- Tate Road, FS 667
- Virginia Highlands Horse Trail, FS 337, 82 m
- Mikes Gap Trail, FS 4504, 2.9 miles
- Ewing Mountain Trail, FS 4502, 2.11 miles

Decommissioned Trails:

- Ponderosa Trail, FS 4600, 1.93 m
- Collins Cove Trail, FS 302, 1.04 m

The boundary of the wildland as determined by the Wilderness Society is shown in the adjacent map. Additional roads and trails are given on National Geographic Map 786. A great variety of information, including topographic maps, aerial views, satellite data and weather information, is obtained by selecting the link with the wild land's coordinates in the upper right of this page.

Beyond maintained trails, old logging roads can be used to explore the area. The Appalachian Mountains were extensively timbered in the early twentieth century leaving logging roads that are becoming overgrown but still passable., Old logging roads and railroad grades can be located by consulting the historical topographic maps available from the United States Geological Survey (USGS). The Devils's Den-Ewing Mountain wild area is covered by USGS topographic maps Cripple Creek and Austinsville.

== Natural history ==
The area contains part of the Raven Cliff special biological area, with sensitive karst lands, a dry calcareous forest and habitat for flora such as the Carolina saxifrage and fauna such as ravens, ospreys, peregrine falcons, and wood ducks. Karst features around the Raven Cliff and lower part of Cove Creek contain disappearing streams, sinkholes, and reappearing streams. Karst sites are of interest because of the biological communities they contain.

Cripple Creek, a tributary of the New River, is a candidate for state scenic river designation. It contains cool water fish such as smallmouth bass, bluegill, and rockbass.

There are large areas of Catawba rhododendron pink-colored flowers in the spring.

== Topography ==
The dominant feature of the area is Ewing Mountain, a long ridge with a maximum elevation of 3038 feet. Other peaks include Devil's Den, 3153 elevation; Chestnut Knob, 3366 feet elevation; and Raven Cliff at 2241 feet. Mikes Gap is on the north side of Ewing mountain with an elevation of 2844 feet. These formations rise above Cripple Creek on the north at 1975 feet elevation.

The area contains two relatively remote areas, one on the west by Devil's Den and the other on the east near Chestnut Knob. The Devil's Den-Ewing Mountain wild area surrounds 400-acre Collins Cove, a private land holding in a pastoral valley with a few buildings.

== Forest Service management ==
In a review of the area in 1999, the Forest Service recognized the 4,234 semi-primitive core area, but it was not included in its roadless inventory. Later the Forest Service raised concerns that the area no longer had a semi-primitive core because of development in the inholding at Collins Cove. Inclusion in the roadless inventory would have limited road construction, reducing the negative environmental impact of roads.

There have been two recent logging projects in the area. In 2003, the Cripple Creek-Grouse Timber Sale was approved for 99 acres of clear-cutting with the construction 2.3 miles of new road and development of 3.2 miles of other roads. The sale was completed in 2009. In 2008 the forest Service approved the Fry Hill timber project with 162 acres of which 32 acres were within the Devils Den-Ewing Mountain area.
