= Mount Rogers Cluster =

Protected natural area in Virginia, United States

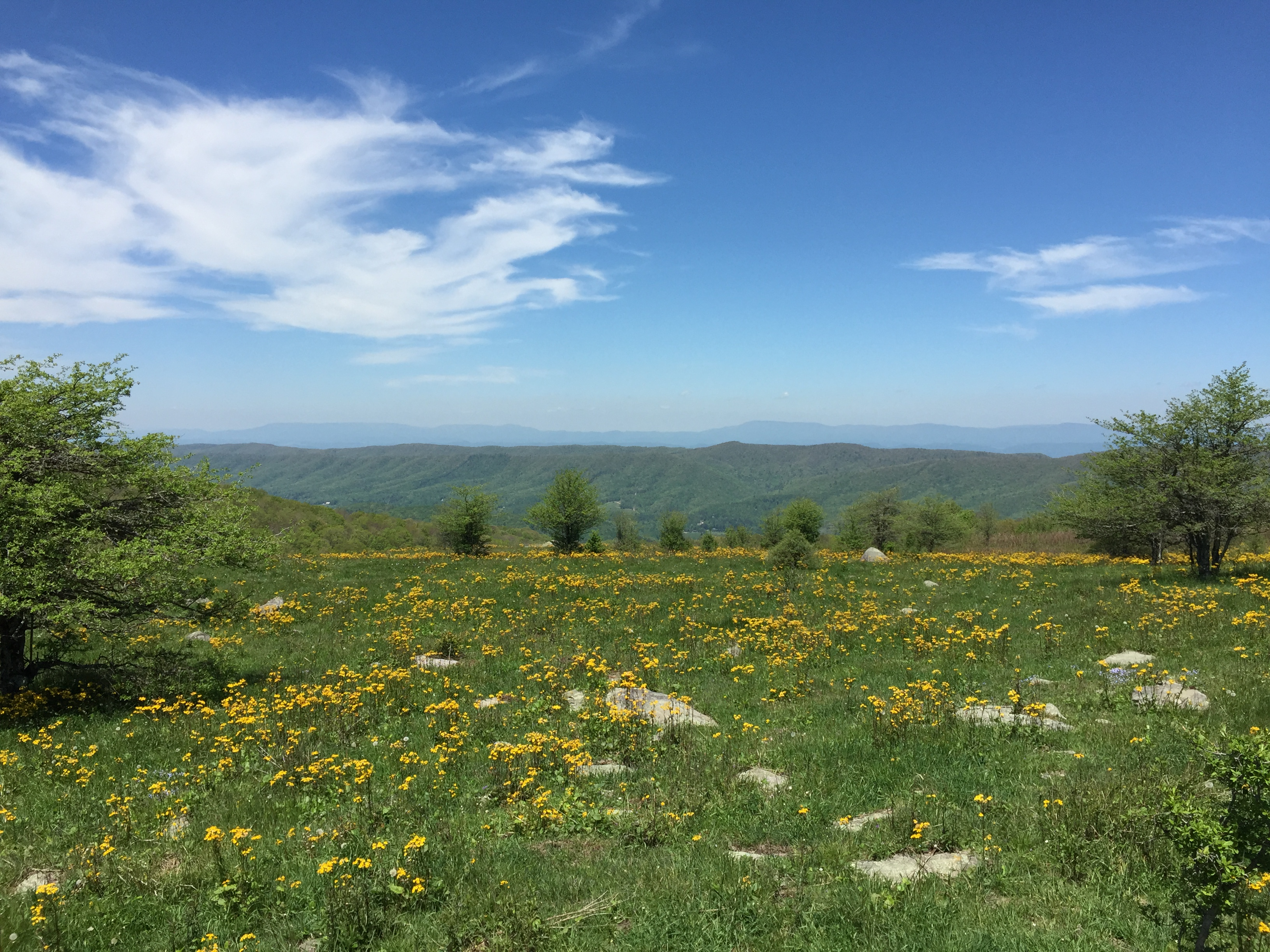
- Mount Rogers High Country

- Location within Virginia Location within the United States
- Coordinates: 36°39′36″N 81°32′40″W

The Mount Rogers Cluster is a region recognized by The Wilderness Society for its unique high elevation mountains, vistas, trout streams and wildlife habitat. The heart of the region is Mount Rogers, the highest mountain in Virginia. The area extends over the Mount Rogers National Recreation Area and into part of the Cherokee National Forest.

With elevations above 5000 feet, the area is unlike any other in Virginia. The high elevations have a Canadian-type climate with a spruce-fir remnant forest and high timbered ridges opening to grassy alpine meadows similar to The Montana Big Sky country. Many trails offer a summer escape from nearby humid lowlands.

== Description ==
The Mount Rogers Wilderness Cluster contains wilderness areas, a National Scenic Area and wildlands recognized by the Wilderness Society as "Mountain Treasures", areas that are worthy of protection from logging and road construction. All of the areas are at least partially within the Mount Rogers National Recreation Area with some extending into the Cherokee National Forest in Tennessee.

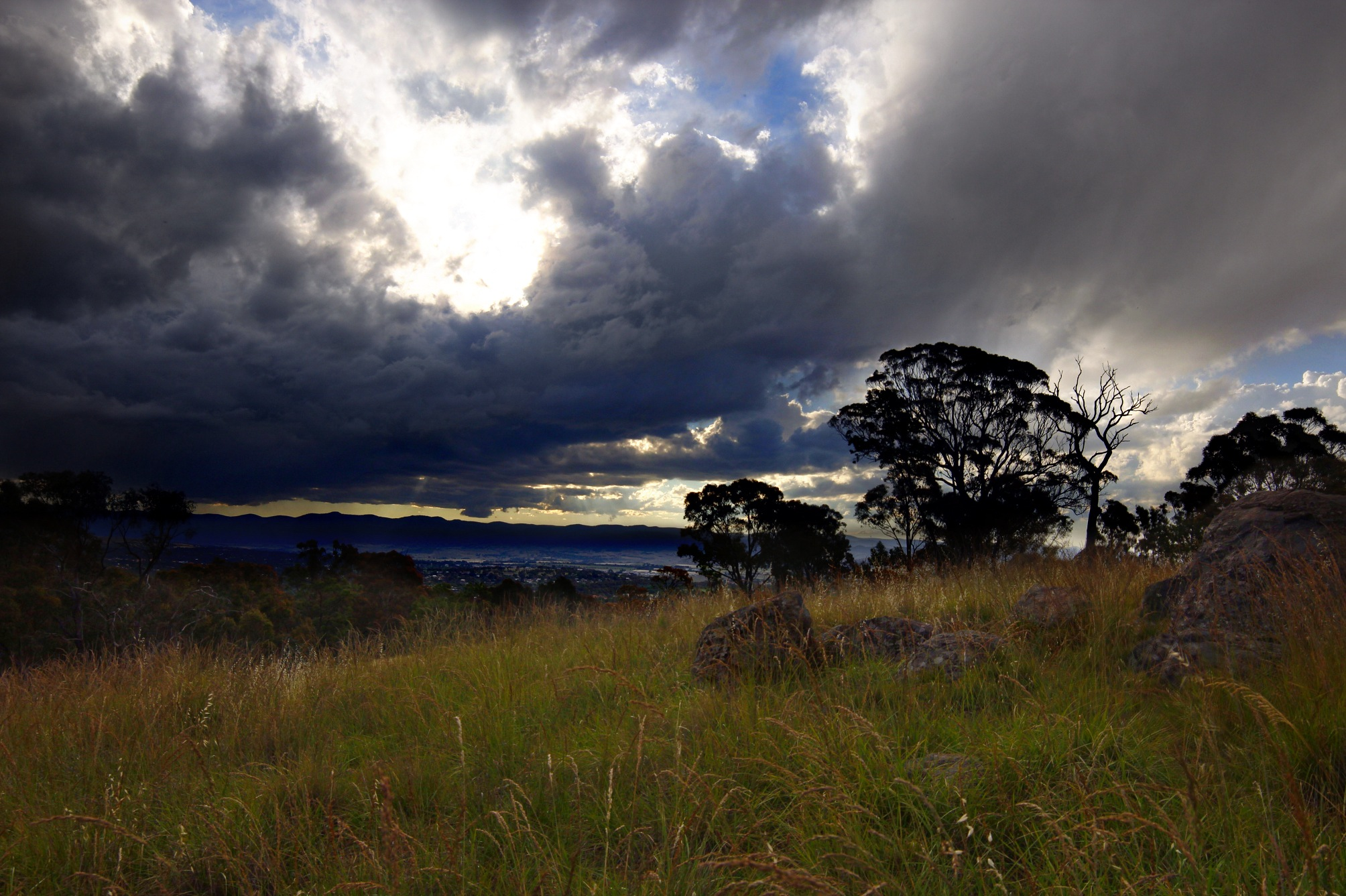
Sunset view from Mount Rogers

The areas in the cluster are:

- Wilderness Areas
  - Lewis Fork Wilderness
  - Little Wilson Creek Wilderness
  - Raccoon Branch Wilderness
  - Little Dry Run Wilderness
- Scenic Area
  - Seng Mountain National Scenic Area
- Wildareas recognized by the Wilderness Society as "Mountain Treasures"
  - Devil's Den-Ewing Mountain
  - Horse Heaven (conservation area)
  - Little Dry Run Wilderness Addition
  - Shaw Gap
  - Feathercamp
  - Mount Rogers Crest Zone
  - Whitetop Mountain (conservation area)
  - Whitetop Laurel
  - Rogers Ridge
  - London Bridge Branch
  - Beaverdam Creek (conservation area)

== Location and access ==
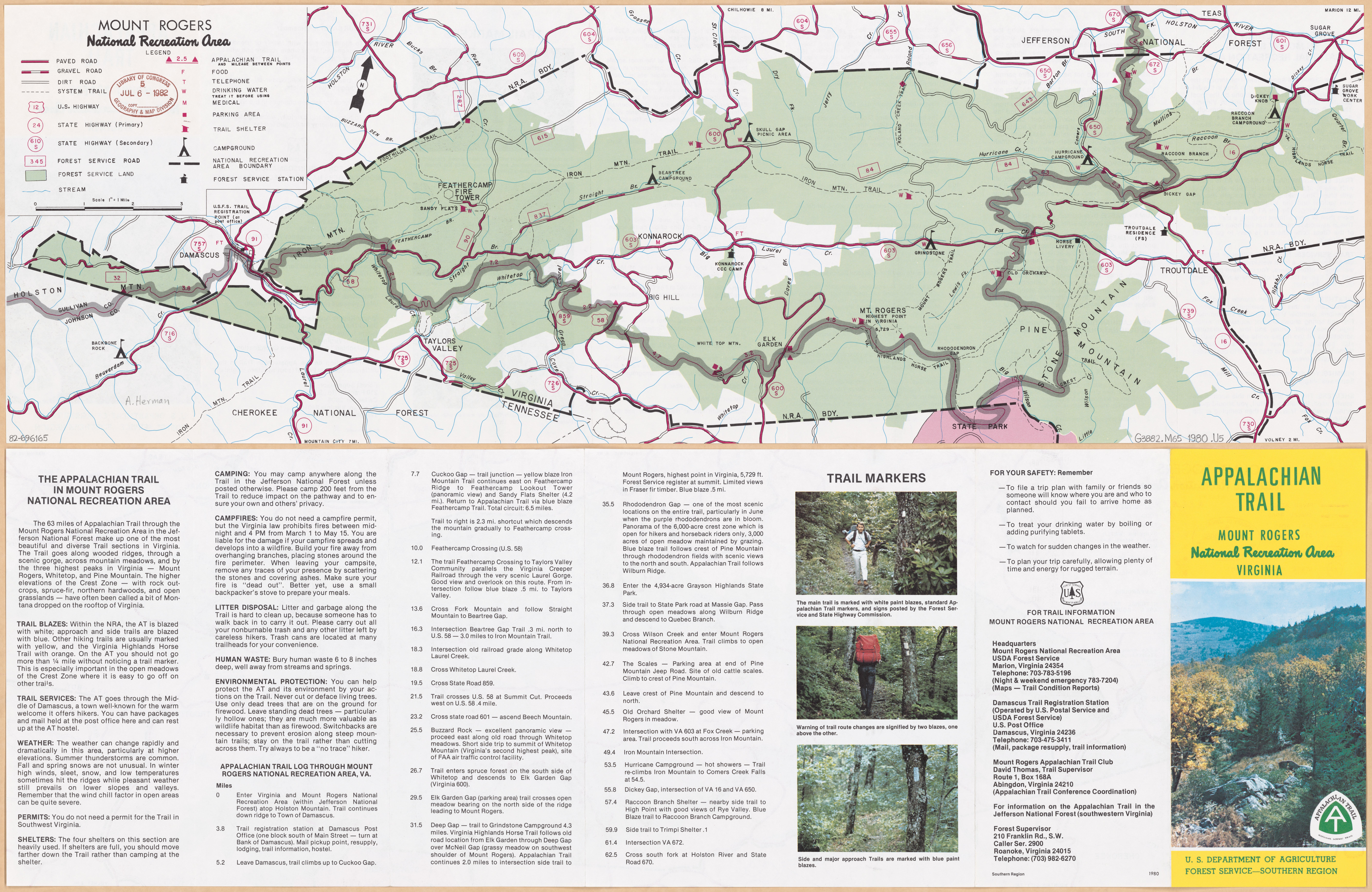
Mount Rogers National Recreation Area

The cluster can be accessed from the south and east by US 58, on the north from Va 16 on the north, and on the east Va 94. A visitor center on Va 16 has maps and information about the area. The nearest towns are Marion, 7 miles north of the visitor center, and Damascus, near the Virginia-Tennessee border.

Roads and trails are given on National Geographic Maps 786 (Mount Rogers)., Map 318 (Mount Rogers High Country) and Map 783 (South Holston and Watauga Lakes). A great variety of information, including topographic maps, aerial views, satellite data and weather information, is obtained by selecting the link with the wild land's coordinates in the upper right of this page.

== Biological significance ==
With elevations ranging from 2000 feet to 5700 feet, the area offers a contrast of deep forested areas and high mountain meadows kept open by burning, cattle grazing and feral ponies. There are nearly 160 different species of birds, as well as rare salamanders including the golden pygmy salamander.

== Geologic history ==
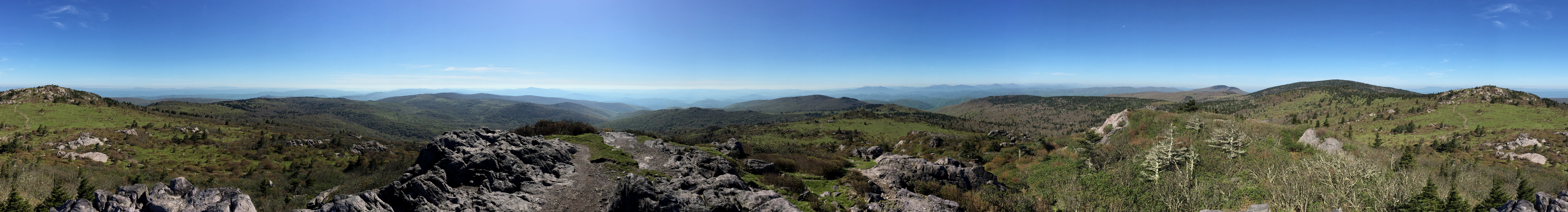
2017-05-16 09 29 11 Full 360-degree panorama from the northern rocky outcrop along the Wilburn Ridge Trail within the Mount Rogers National Recreation Area in Grayson County, Virginia

The bedrock beneath Mt Rogers is different from most other rocks in Virginia. The formation is divided into three sections—the oldest is made of basalt lava flows, some rhyolite, volcanic ash and sandstone indicating volcanic formation; the second oldest, about half of the total thickness, is made mainly of rhyolite with some basalt and sediments; and the youngest is mainly composed of sediments with some basalt and rhyolite. There are several explanations for the origins of these rocks with some geologists claiming that the rocks were formed elsewhere and transported along fault lines.

Most of the area drains into the New River, the southernmost river on the American continent that flows from south to north cutting across the Appalachians into the Gulf of Mexico by way of the Ohio and Mississippi Rivers. Some geologists have the New River as a successor to a larger river that drained the entire area to the west and east of Mount Rogers. With time, the Atlantic Ocean opened to create an Atlantic drainage capturing some of the headwaters of the New River's predecessor by a process known as stream capture.

== See also ==
- Volcanic History of the Mount Rogers Area

== Other clusters ==
Other clusters of the Wilderness Society's "Mountain Treasures" in the Jefferson National Forest (north to south):

- Glenwood Cluster
- Craig Creek Cluster
- Barbours Creek-Shawvers Run Cluster
- Sinking Creek Valley Cluster
- Mountain Lake Wilderness Cluster
- Angels Rest Cluster
- Walker Mountain Cluster
- Kimberling Creek Cluster
- Garden Mountain Cluster
- Clinch Ranger District Cluster
