= Horse Heaven (conservation area) =

Area in Virginia, USA

- Location within Virginia
- Location: Wythe County, Virginia, Virginia, United States
- Coordinates: 36°47′47″N 81°6′58″W
- Area: 4,744 acres (19.20 km^{2})

Horse Heaven is a wildland in the George Washington and Jefferson National Forests of western Virginia, United States, that has been recognized by the Wilderness Society as a special place worthy of protection from logging and road construction. The Wilderness Society has designated the area as a "Mountain Treasure".

With forests of oak, hickory and pine, the area offers the visitor solitude and scenic beauty. Recreational opportunities include horseback riding, mountain biking, hiking, hunting and primitive camping. The hiker can follow along a creek with small waterfalls. Hussy Mountain Horse Camp on the south side of the area, and the Virginia Horse Trail, extending through the area, are popular for camping and horse riding.

The Forest Service refers to the area as "Little Horse Heaven".

The area is part of the Mount Rogers Cluster.

== Location and access ==
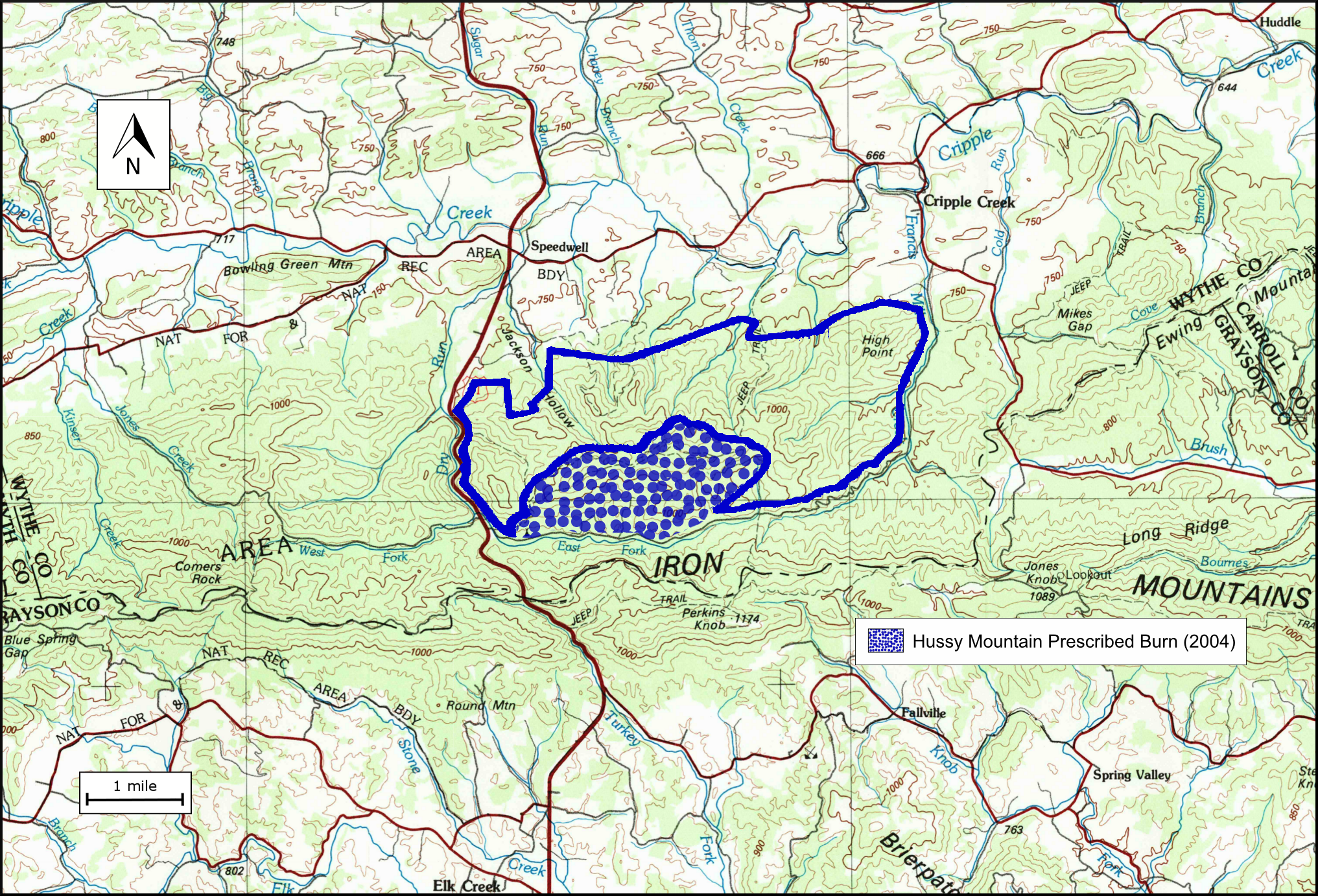
Boundary of the Horse Heaven wildland in the Jefferson National Forest as identified by the Wilderness Society.

The area is located in the Appalachian Mountains of Southwestern Virginia about 2 miles southwest of Cripple Creek, Virginia, between Va 602 on the west and south, and Va 94 on the east, and Va 642 on the north.

Trails and roads into the area include:

- Henley Hollow Trailhead Rd, FS 4962
- Henley Hiollow Trail, FS 306
- Virginia Highlands Horse Trail, FS 337, 82 m
- Horse Heaven Trail, FS 4507, 0.36 miles

Decommissioned Trails:

- Rocky Hollow Trail, FS 308, 1.33 m

The boundary of the wildland as determined by the Wilderness Society is shown in the adjacent map. Additional roads and trails are given on National Geographic Map 786. A great variety of information, including topographic maps, aerial views, satellite data and weather information, is obtained by selecting the link with the wildland's coordinates in the upper right of this page.

Beyond maintained trails, old logging roads can be used to explore the area. The Appalachian Mountains were extensively timbered in the early twentieth century leaving logging roads that are becoming overgrown but still passable., Old logging roads and railroad grades can be located by consulting the historical topographic maps available from the United States Geological Survey (USGS). The Horse Heaven wild area is covered by USGS topographic maps Cripple Creek and Speedwell.

== Natural history ==
The forest is mainly composed of broadleaf trees with some yellow pine. Areas with a favorable environment for tree growth, such as colluvial drainages, toeslopes, and floodplains of smaller streams, contain yellow poplar, northern red oak, white oak, basswood, cucumber tree, white ash, eastern hemlock and red maple. A large fraction of the area, mainly on the west and north with a less favorable environment for tree growth, contains red oak, white oak, and hickory. Ridgetops, and east midslopes have a preponderance of chestnut oak, scarlet oak and yellow pine.

The area has as much as 534 acres of old growth forest; eight percent of the area has trees over 100 years old.

With a good population of deer, turkey and grey squirrel, wildlife habitat is enhanced by the maintenance of eight wildlife openings, four sprout openings and a waterhole. Stream habitat restoration in Francis Mill Creek provide an improved environment for aquatic species and other wildlife.

Table mountain pine and pitch pine are found in about 10% of the area, primarily on south facing ridges with dry, well-drained soils. Southern pine beetle infestations have been seen in parts of the area, and gypsy moths, found in an area 1.2 miles to the east, are expected to spread into the area.

Francis Mill Creek, on the east, is ranked by the state as a class iii trout stream.

== Topography ==
The area, part of the Southern Blue Ridge Mountains Subsection within the Central Appalachian Broadleaf Coniferous Forest-Meadow Province, has tectonic uplifted mountain ranges composed of igneous and metamorphic rock with many high gradient, deeply incised streams. Running west to east, Horse Heaven Ridge bisects the area. Peaks along this ridge include Porter Mountain, Little Horse Heaven, High Point and Hussy Mountain. Elevations range from 2350 feet near Francis Mill Creek to 3873 feet on the crest of Horse Heaven Ridge.

Rock types found in the area are quartzite and shale, with some dolomite and limestone along the northern and eastern sides of the area.

Small streams flow into the headwaters of Dry Run, on the western edge of the area, and into Francis Mill Creek, along the eastern edge. These waters then flow into Cripple Creek, which is about two miles north of the area.

== Forest Service management ==
The Forest Service has conducted a survey of their lands to determine the potential for wilderness designation. Wilderness designation provides a high degree of protection from development. The areas that were found suitable are referred to as inventoried roadless areas. Later a Roadless Rule was adopted that limited road construction in these areas. The rule provided some degree of protection by reducing the negative environmental impact of road construction and thus promoting the conservation of roadless areas.[1] Horse Heaven was inventoried in the roadless area review, and therefore protected from possible road construction and timber sales.

A 900-acre prescribed fire in the spring of 1998 included 350 acres of the area. The burn in the under-story modified the forest composition for the purpose of benefiting wildlife by improving oak regeneration for mast promoting regeneration of table mountain pine. The serotinous cones of table mountain pine require heat from fire to open and disburse their seeds.

The area includes 605 acres of privately owned mineral rights. Abandoned manganese mines near the northern border have cliffs up to 100 feet, earning them the name of the "little grand canyon".

Most of the area is designated by the forest service as "Backcountry - Non-motorized".

== See also ==
- Mount Rogers Cluster
- USGS topographic map of region
