= Shaw Gap =

Wildland in Virginia, U.S.

- Location within Virginia
- Location: Washington County, Virginia, Virginia, United States
- Coordinates: 36°40′42″N 81°41′2″W
- Area: 4,982 acres (20.16 km^{2})

Shaw Gap is a wildland in the George Washington and Jefferson National Forests of western Virginia that has been recognized by the Wilderness Society as a special place worthy of protection from logging and road construction. The Wilderness Society has designated the area as a "Mountain Treasure".

The Iron Mountain Trail, passing through the center of the area along Iron Mountain, was once the site of the Appalachian Trail and, consequently, received protection not found on other trails. Older trees are found along many sections of the trail. The area has plentiful wildlife, and the site of an old homestead is still visible. The forest service classifies a large section of the area as having unspoiled scenic beauty.

The area is part of the Mount Rogers Cluster.

== Location and access ==
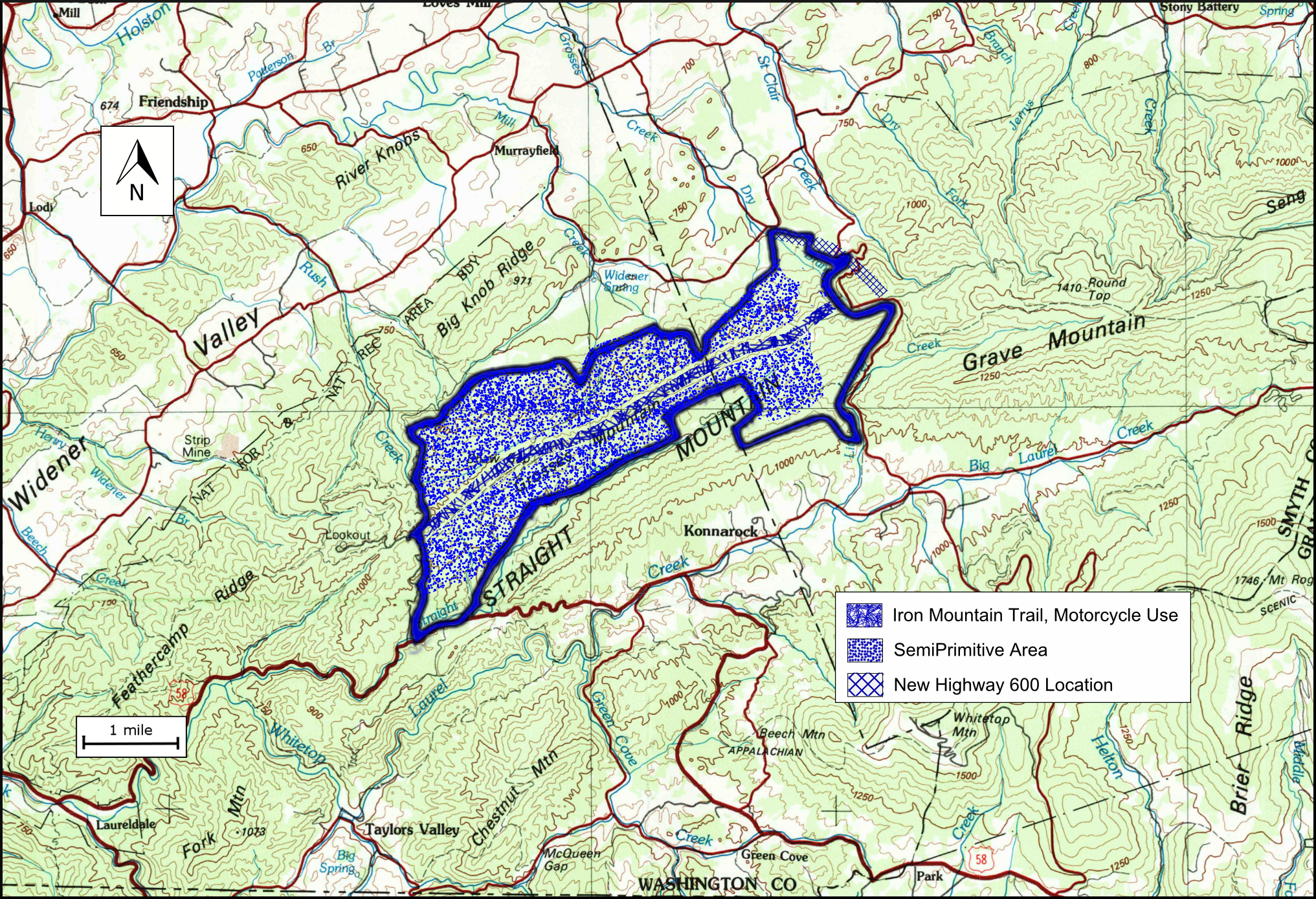
Shaw Gap wild area

The area is located in the Appalachian Mountains of Southwestern Virginia about 2.7 miles northwest of Konnarock, Virginia between USFS Rd 90 on the west and Va 600 on the east. It lies between the Feathercamp wild area and the Seng Mountain National Scenic Area.

Trails and roads into the area include:

- Beaver Gap, FS (Forest Service) 4551, 3.1 miles, moderate difficulty, yellow diamond blaze, hiking and mountain biking
- Beaver Flats, FS 4611, 0.3 miles, easy, no blaze, hiking
- Chestnut Ridge, FS 4542, 1.8 miles, difficult, yellow triangle blaze, hiking, mountain biking, horses
- Iron Mountain, FS 301, 6.3 miles, moderate, yellow blaze, hiking, mountain biking, horses and motorcycles
- Iron Mountain Spur A, FS 4641, 0.7 miles, easy, yellow blaze, hiking, mountain biking, horses, motorcycles
- Lum, FS 4544, 1.0 miles, moderate, yellow diamond blaze, hiking and mountain biking
- Rush, FS 4565, 1.8 miles, difficult, yellow square blaze, hiking, mountain biking, horses
- Shaw Gap, FS 4545, 1.0 miles, moderate, yellow square blaze, hiking, mountain biking
- Skulls Gap FS 4637, 1.0 miles, moderate, no blaze, hiking, mountain biking, horses
- Straight Branch, FS 168, 1.5 miles, moderate, yellow triangle blaze, hiking, mountain biking

The boundary of the wildland as determined by the Wilderness Society is shown in the adjacent map. Additional roads and trails are given on National Geographic Maps 786 (Mount Rogers). and Map 318 (Mount Rogers High Country) A great variety of information, including topographic maps, aerial views, satellite data and weather information, is obtained by selecting the link with the wild land's coordinates in the upper right of this page.

Beyond maintained trails, old logging roads can be used to explore the area. The Appalachian Mountains were extensively timbered in the early twentieth century leaving logging roads that are becoming overgrown but still passable. Old logging roads and railroad grades can be located by consulting the historical topographic maps available from the United States Geological Survey (USGS). The Shaw Gap wild area is covered by USGS topographic maps Konnarock and Whitetop Mountain.

The Beartree Recreation area, to the south, offers camping and hiking as well as swimming and fishing in Beartree Lake.

== Natural history ==
There are several old growth tracks on the western and eastern sides of the area.

Streams in the area are recognized for their water quality. Wild natural trout streams in Virginia are classified by the Department of Game and Inland Fisheries by their water quality, with class i the highest and class iv the lowest. Rush Creek and Mill Creek are class ii streams.

== Topography ==
As part of the Southern Blue Ridge Mountains Subsection within the Central Appalachian Broadleaf Coniferous Forest-Meadow Province, there are tectonic uplifted mountain ranges composed of igneous and metamorphic rock with many high gradient, deeply incised streams.

The area is drained by Rush Creek, which flows southwest, and Mill Creek, flowing to the northeast. Both creeks flow into the South Fork of the Holston River, about north four miles north and west of the area.

== Forest Service management ==
The Forest Service has conducted a survey of their lands to determine the potential for wilderness designation. Wilderness designation provides a high degree of protection from development. The areas that were found suitable are referred to as inventoried roadless areas. Later a Roadless Rule was adopted that limited road construction in these areas. The rule provided some degree of protection by reducing the negative environmental impact of road construction and thus promoting the conservation of roadless areas. The area was not inventoried in the roadless area review, and therefore not protected from possible road construction and timber sales.

Route 600 on the eastern boundary was relocated, straightened and widened where it crosses Iron Mountain. Completed in 1999, the new section is further to the east. The old road has been removed with a section forming a trail to an overlook along the new route.

The forest service classifies areas under their management by a recreational opportunity setting that informs visitors of the diverse range of opportunities available in the forest. A large area on the north has been designated by the Forest Service as "back country-few roads", an area to the south of Iron Mountain, near the Bear Creek campground, is designated "concentrated recreation", areas along the Iron Mountain Trail are designated "semi-primitive motorized", and surrounding areas to the north and south are designated "semi primitive 2".
