= London Bridge Branch =

Protected natural area in Virginia, United States

- Location within Virginia
- Location: Virginia, Tennessee, United States
- Coordinates: 36°36′5″N 81°46′41″W
- Area: 5,646 acres (22.85 km^{2})

London Bridge Branch, a wildland in the George Washington and Jefferson National Forests of western Virginia and the Cherokee National Forest of eastern Tennessee, has been recognized by the Wilderness Society as a special place worthy of protection from logging and road construction. The Wilderness Society has designated the area as a "Mountain Treasure".

With good views of Doe Valley, Rogers Ridge and Mount Rogers from rocky outcrops, the Iron Mountain Trail runs along the length of the area and has a connection with the Appalachian Trail.

The area is part of the Mount Rogers Cluster.

== Location and access ==
The area is located in the Appalachian Mountains of Southwestern Virginia and Eastern Tennessee, about 1 mile northwest of Laurel Bloomery, Tennessee and 1 mile south of Damascus, Virginia. It is bounded by Tennessee Highway 91 on the east and Tennessee Highway 133 on the west.

The Iron Mountain Trail, (FS 54 in Tennessee, FS 301 in Virginia) is a blue-blazed trail running through the center of the area from north to south.

Road access into the area in Virginia is provided by Va 4042. An abandoned Forest Service Road 322 connects the Iron Mountain Trail from Backbone Rock in Tennessee.

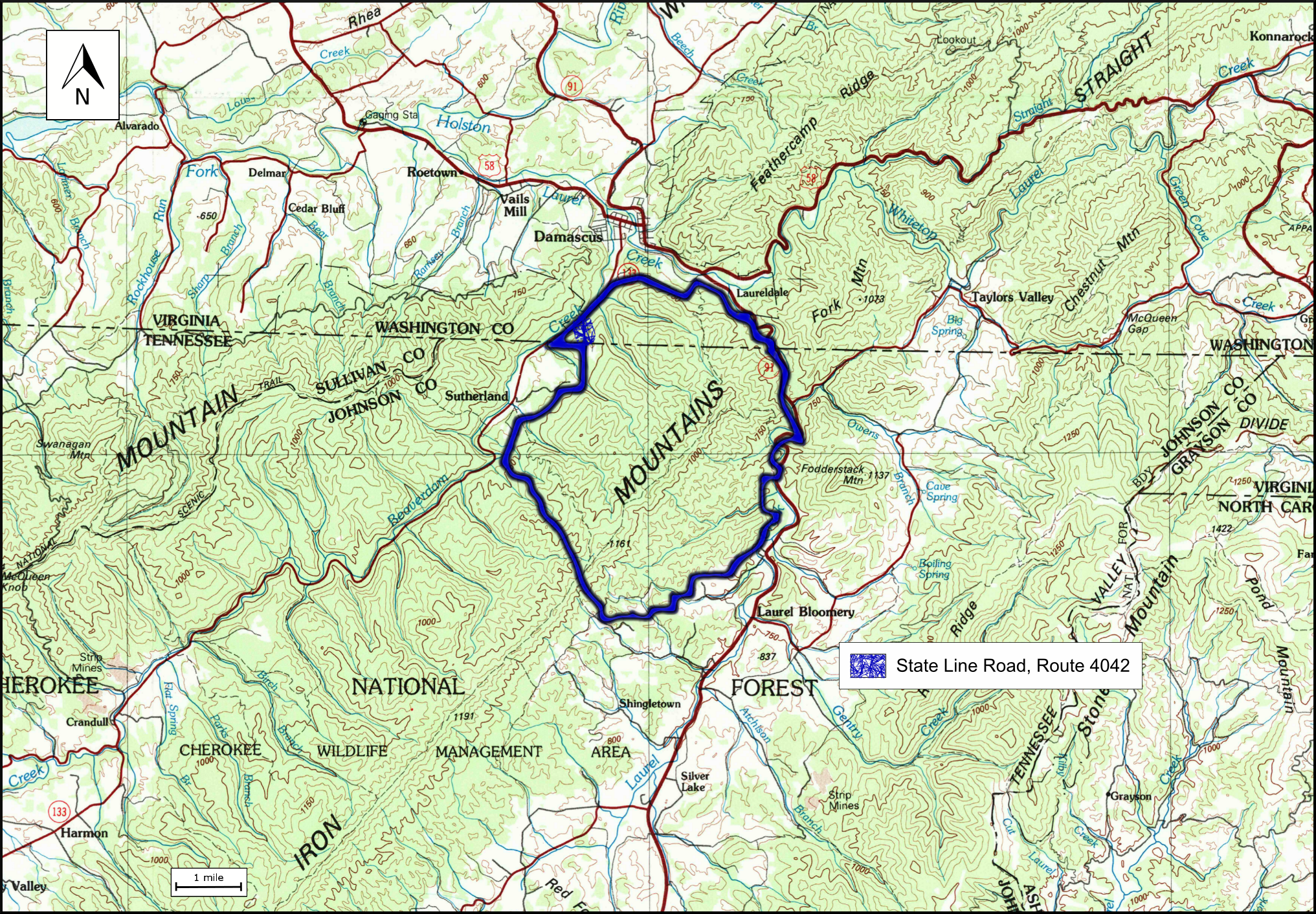
Boundary of the London Bridge Branch wild area as identified by the Wilderness Society.

The boundary of the wildland as determined by the Wilderness Society is shown in the adjacent map. Additional roads and trails are given on National Geographic Maps 783 (Mount Rogers). and Map 783 (South Holston and Watauga Lakes) A great variety of information, including topographic maps, aerial views, satellite data and weather information, is obtained by selecting the link with the wild land's coordinates in the upper right of this page.

Beyond maintained trails, old logging roads can be used to explore the area. The Appalachian Mountains were extensively timbered in the early twentieth century leaving logging roads that are becoming overgrown but still passable. Old logging roads and railroad grades can be located by consulting the historical topographic maps available from the United States Geological Survey (USGS). The London Bridge Branch wild area is covered by USGS topographic maps Laurel Bloomery and Damascus.

== Natural history ==
The forest is dominated by white and scarlet oak. Yellow poplar is found at lower elevations, pitch pine on drier and disturbed areas, and chestnut oak and northern red oak at moderate elevations.

London Bridge Branch in Virginia part is recognized by Virginia for its water quality. Wild natural trout streams in Virginia are classified by the Department of Game and Inland Fisheries by their water quality, with class i the highest and class iv the lowest. London Bridge Branch is a class ii trout stream.

== Topography ==
With elevations ranging from 2000 feet in the lower drainages to 3600 feet on the ridge crest, London Bridge Branch wild area is dominated by a mountain ridge with small, steep sideslopes.

A diversity of geologic features is characteristic of the Southern Appalachian Mountains. Geologic rock types are the Erwin Formation with white, vitreous quartzite, interbeds of dark-green, silty and sandy shale, minor siltstones and very fine sandstone; the Hampton Formation with dark greenish-gray, silty and sandy shale, micaceous shale, numerous layers of medium-grained, feldspathic, and thinly bedded sandstone; the Union Formation, a sequence of grey feldspathic sandstone, arkose, conglomerate, greywacke, siltstone and shale, and greenish amygdaloidal basalt flow; and Shady Dolomite, a light gray, well-bedded dolomite with thin to medium-bedded gray limestone, and yellowish brown residual clays with "jasperoid" diagnostic.

== Forest Service management ==
The Forest Service has conducted a survey of their lands to determine the potential for wilderness designation. Wilderness designation provides a high degree of protection from development. The areas that were found suitable are referred to as inventoried roadless areas. Later a Roadless Rule was adopted that limited road construction in these areas. The rule provided some degree of protection by reducing the negative environmental impact of road construction and thus promoting the conservation of roadless areas. London Bridge Branch was inventoried in the roadless area review, and therefore protected from possible road construction and timber sales.

The forest service classifies areas under their management by a recreational opportunity setting that informs visitors of the diverse range of opportunities available in the forest. A large part of the area in Virginia near Beaver Dam Creek and Laurel Creek is designated "Eligible Recreation River". A small portion on the east is designated "Backcountry-Non Motorized", a semi-primitive 2 area. The Tennessee side is divided between "Remote Backcrouintry-Few Roads", "Remote Backcountry, non-motorized", and "Black Bear Habitat Management".
