= Silverling =

Silverling is a common name for several plants and may refer to:

- Baccharis glomeruliflora, native to North America
- Baccharis halimifolia, native to North America
- Paronychia argyrocoma, native to the Eastern United States
