= Little Dry Run Wilderness =

Wilderness area in Virginia, United States

- IUCN category Ib (wilderness area)
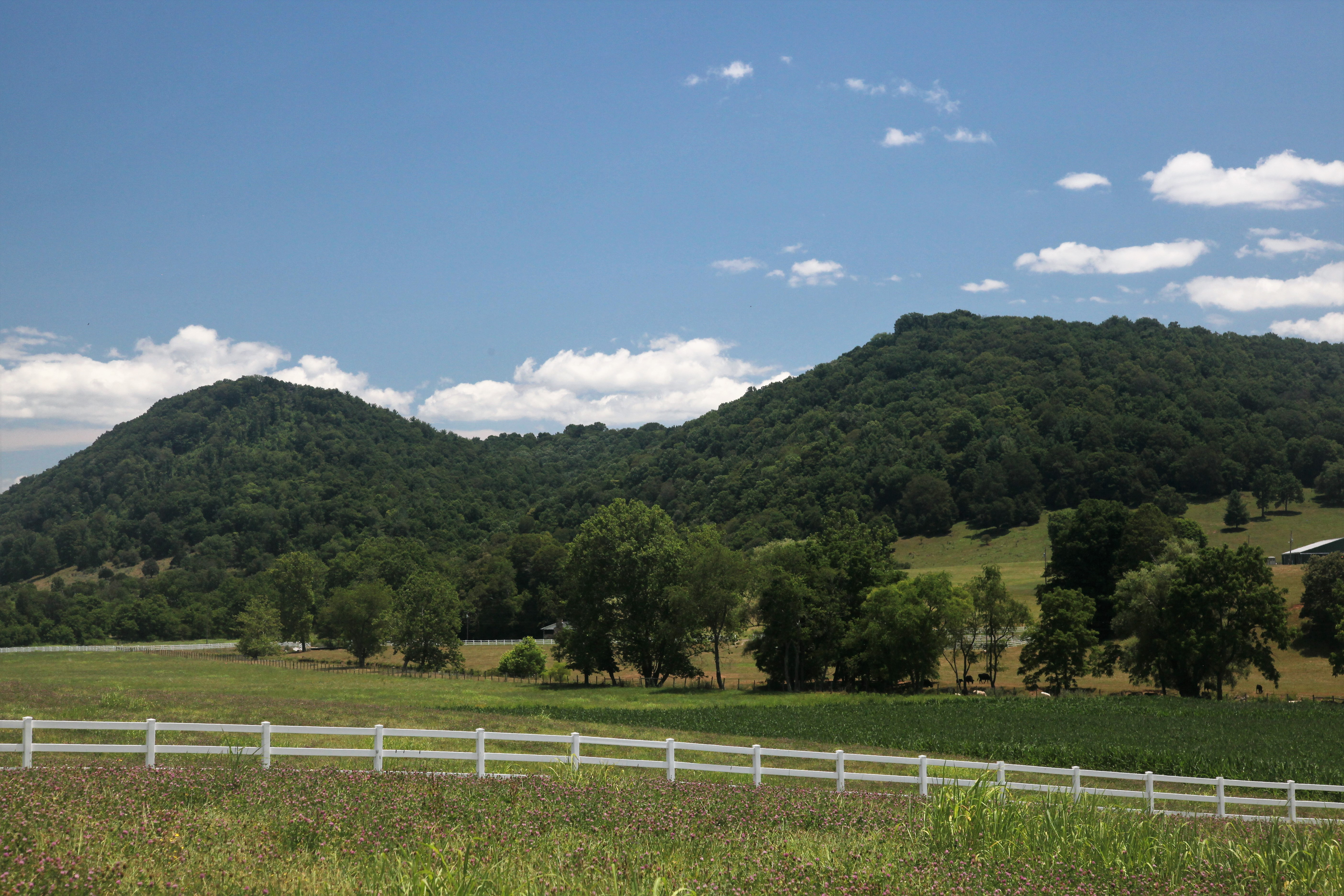
- Looking south into mountains in vicinity of Little Dry Run Wilderness Area from State Route 749 near Speedwell Va

- Location within Virginia
- Location: Wythe County Virginia, United States
- Nearest city: Wytheville, Virginia
- Coordinates: 36.78575°N 81.21154°W
- Area: 2,858 acres (1,157 ha)
- Established: 1984
- Administrator: U.S. Forest Service

The Little Dry Run Wilderness is an area in the Mount Rogers National Recreation Area protected by the Eastern Wilderness Act of Congress to maintain its present, natural condition. As part of the wilderness system, it is intended to preserve a variety of natural life forms and contribute to a diversity of plant and animal gene pools. Over half of the ecosystems in the United States exist within designated wilderness.

Named after Little Dry Run, a stream lined with hemlocks and white pines that runs through the center of the wilderness, the area has good hikes far removed from the busy west side of the Mount Rogers Recreation Area: which is part of the Mount Rogers Cluster.

== Location and access ==
The wilderness is located at the east end of Mount Rogers Recreation Area. near the town of Speedwell in Wythe County. It is bounded on the east by US 21, and on the south and west by the Virginia Highlands Horse Trail. The northern boundary is about 1 mile south of VA 612.

There is one maintained trail, the Little Dry Run Trail, Forest Service Trail #305, with a few yellow blazes, 4.4 miles long, and moderately difficult with trailheads on US 21 at the eastern end of the trail, and Comers Rock Campground on the west.

The Virginia Highlands Horse Trail borders the wilderness on the southern side.

The Virginia Highlands Extension extends from the Horse Trail for four miles to a ridgetop.

The Ridge Top Area Bushwhack is a 4-mile hike beginning at the junction of Little Dry Run Trail and the Virginia Highlands Trail.

== Natural history ==
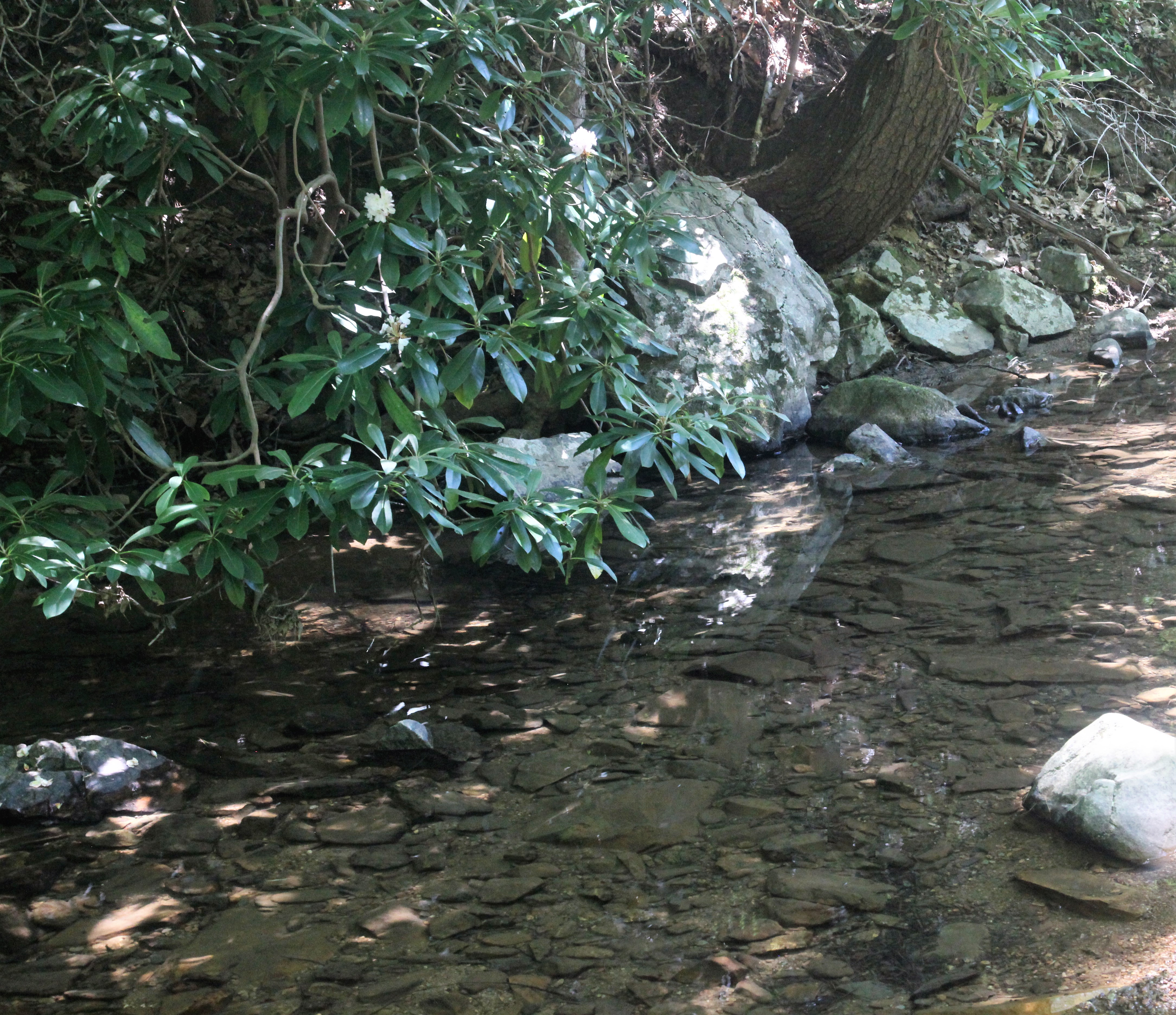
Dry Run, near Little Dry Run Wilderness on State Route 21, south of Speedwell, Virginia

With different habitats, the wilderness is home to a large variety of species. In the spring, wood anemone, false Solomon’s seal, foamflower, mayapple, large-flowered trillium, red trillium, and Solomon's seal can be seen.

Bird species include worm-eating warblers, black and white warblers, golden crowned kinglets, eastern wood pewees and pine warblers. Eastern redbud, Frazer magnolia, witch-hazel and mountain maple provide dense cover for nesting birds such as the wood thrush, summer tanager, red-eyed vireo and ovenbird.

Cove forests contain white bass-wood, tulip poplar, sugar maple, white ash and eastern hemlock. The wilderness is in an area that contains the rare round-leaf birch. Remnants of old growth forest are found near Sindion Point.

Little Dry Run is a native trout stream.

== Topography ==
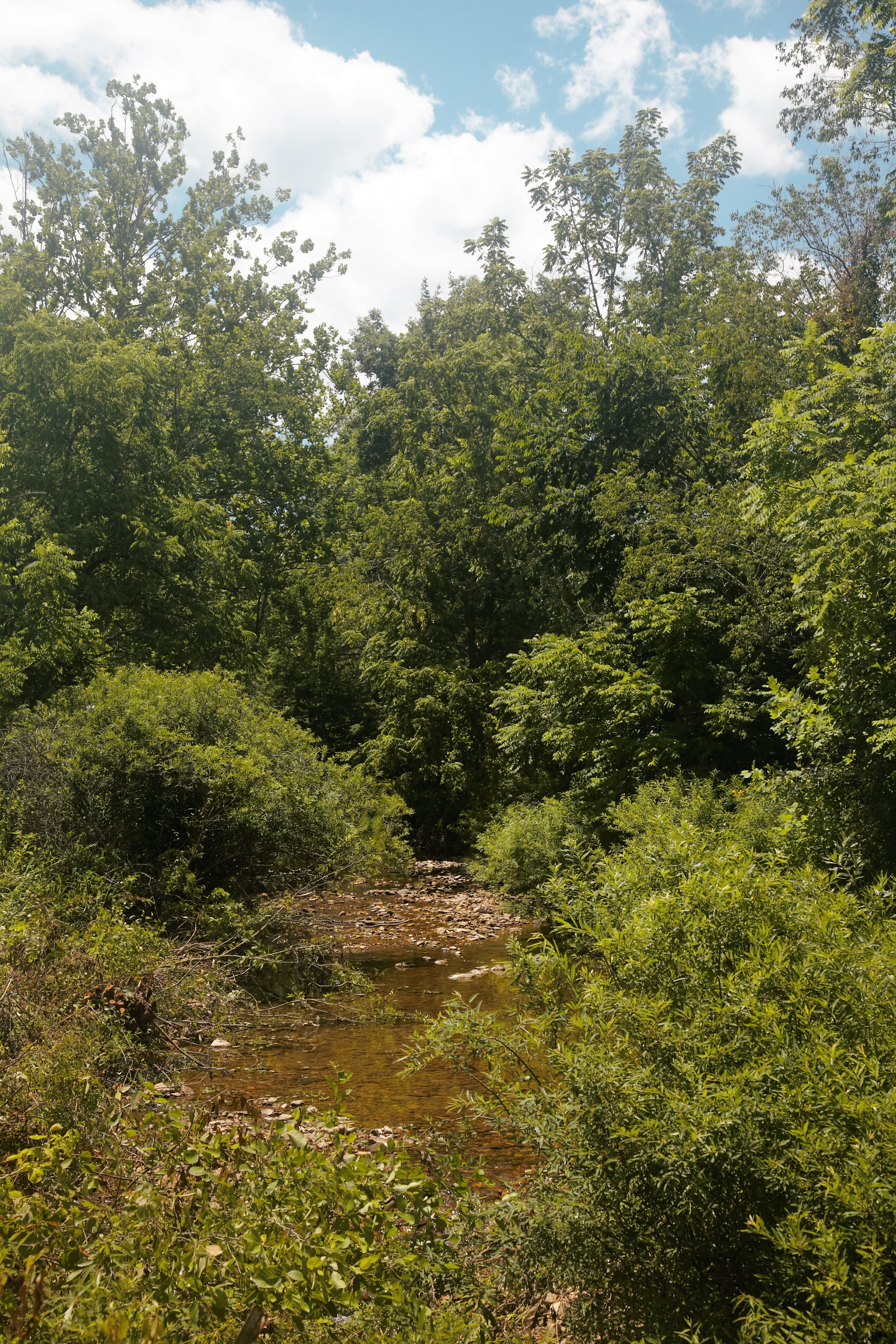
Crigger Creek carrying drainage from Little Dry Run Wilderness, along Crigger Creek Road near Speedwell, Va

The watershed of Little Dry Run, completely enclosed in the wilderness, begins with a small bog, then descends to join Dry Run which flows north along the eastern side of the wilderness. Two rivers flow along the wilderness’ boundary—Jones Creek on the northwest and West Dry Run Fork on the south.

Elevations range from 2440 feet along Little Dry Run to a 3614 feet at an unnamed peak. A small knob on the northwest corner of the wilderness, Sindion Point, elevation 3018 feet, stands at the end of a ridge running through the wilderness.

Nearby Comers Rock, outside the wilderness on the south, with an elevation of 4102 feet, has an observation platform offering views of the surrounding countryside.

The wilderness is part of the Blue Ridge Province which is distinct from the Ridge and Valley Province to the west.

== Management ==
Designated by Congress in 1984, the 2845 acres of wilderness is managed by the Forest Service through the Mount Rogers National Recreation Area.

There are some regulations to maintain the integrity of the area as a wilderness. For example, motorized equipment, motor vehicles and mountain bikes are prohibited, group size is limited to ten people, and limits are placed on camping.

== See also ==
- Mount Rogers Cluster
- Wilderness
