= Beaverdam Creek (conservation area) =

Protected natural area in Virginia, United States

- Location within Virginia
- Location: Virginia, Tennessee, United States
- Coordinates: 36°35′35″N 81°51′40″W
- Area: 6,263 acres (25.35 km^{2})

Beaverdam Creek (conservation area), a wildland in the George Washington and Jefferson National Forests of western Virginia and the Cherokee National Forest of eastern Tennessee, has been recognized by the Wilderness Society as a special place worthy of protection from logging and road construction. The Wilderness Society has designated the area as a "Mountain Treasure".

Located on upper Holston Mountain, the area is bordered by Beaverdam Creek, a trout stream that is home to the hellbender, one of the largest salamanders in the world.

The area is part of the Mount Rogers Cluster.

== Location and access ==
The area is located in the Appalachian Mountains of Southwestern Virginia and Eastern Tennessee, about 6 miles west of Laurel Bloomery, Tennessee and 2 miles southwest of Damascus, Virginia. It is bounded by Tennessee Highway 133 on the east.

The Appalachian Trail passes through the area for 4.0 miles. Other trails include the Backbone Trail, Forest Trail 53, 2.0 miles long; and the Tennessee Trail, Forest Trail 4561, 0.9 miles long.

Road access to the area in the Cherokee National Forest is provided by routes 295 A, B and C.

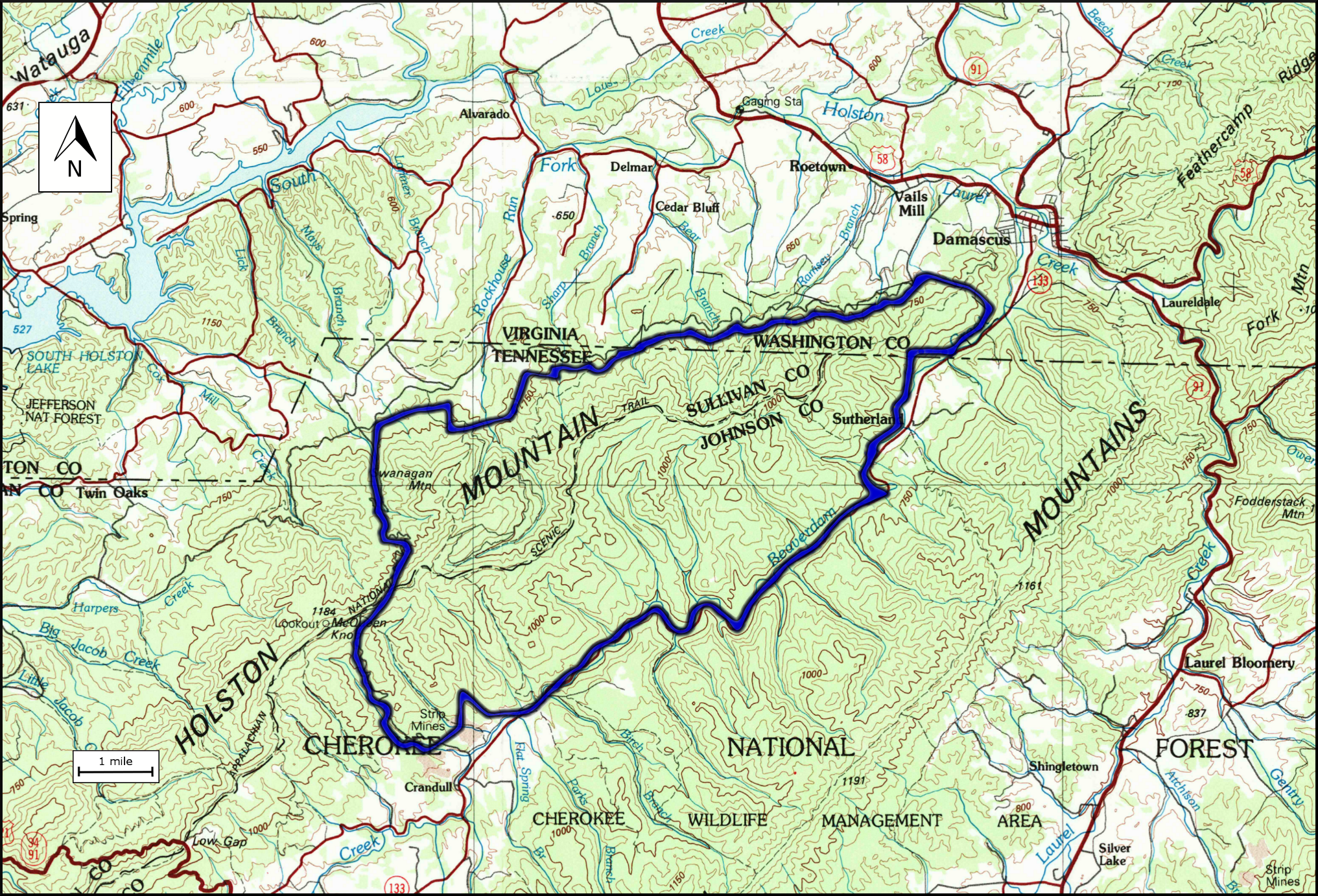
Boundary of the Beaverdam Creek wild area as identified by the Wilderness Society.

The boundary of the wildland as determined by the Wilderness Society is shown in the adjacent map. Additional roads and trails are given on National Geographic Maps 786 (Mount Rogers). and Map 783 (South Holston and Watauga Lakes) A great variety of information, including topographic maps, aerial views, satellite data and weather information, is obtained by selecting the link with the wildland's gps coordinates in the upper right of this page.

Beyond maintained trails, old logging roads can be used to explore the area. The Appalachian Mountains were extensively timbered in the early twentieth century leaving logging roads that are becoming overgrown but still passable. Old logging roads and railroad grades can be located by consulting the historical topographic maps available from the United States Geological Survey (USGS). The Beaverdam Creek wild area is covered by USGS topographic maps Shady Valley, Laurel Bloomery and Damascus.

== Natural history ==
The forest is dominated by white and scarlet oak. Yellow poplar is found at lower elevations, pitch pine on drier and disturbed areas, and chestnut oak and northern red oak at moderate elevations. There is a 76-acre stand of Table Mountain pine.

Micranthres caroliniana and Carolina hemlock are two rare plants found in the area. The site includes one acre of the protection area for Fritzs Breathing (Lowes) Cave.

No old growth forest has been identified in the area. There are about 4723 acres of late-forest successional type and 208 acres of mid-successional forest type.

There are a number of cove hardwood stands older than 80 years and as large as 80 acres.

== Topography ==
With elevations ranging from 2200 feet in the lower drainages to 3600 feet on the ridge crest, Beaverdam Creek wild area is dominated by a mountain ridge with steep sideslopes.

A diversity of geologic features is characteristic of the Southern Appalachian Mountains. Geologic rock types are the Erwin Formation with white, vitreous quartzite, interbeds of dark-green, silty and sandy shale, minor siltstones and very fine sandstone; the Hampton Formation with dark greenish-gray, silty and sandy shale, micaceous shale, numerous layers of medium-grained, feldspathic, and thinly bedded sandstone; the Union Formation, a sequence of grey feldspathic sandstone, arkose, conglomerate, greywacke, siltstone and shale, and greenish amygdaloidal basalt flow; and Shady Dolomite, a light gray, well-bedded dolomite with thin to medium-bedded gray limestone, and yellowish brown residual clays with "jasperoid" diagnostic.

The area, divided by Holston Mountain, has a northern part with headwater streams that flow north to the South Fork Holston River, and a southern part with streams flowing south into Beaverdam Creek, a tributary of the South Fork Holston River.

== Forest Service management ==
The Forest Service has conducted a survey of their lands to determine the potential for wilderness designation. Wilderness designation provides a high degree of protection from development. The areas that were found suitable are referred to as inventoried roadless areas. Later a Roadless Rule was adopted that limited road construction in these areas. The rule provided some degree of protection by reducing the negative environmental impact of road construction and thus promoting the conservation of roadless areas. Beaverdam Creek was inventoried in the roadless area review, and therefore protected from possible road construction and timber sales.

The forest service classifies areas under their management by a recreational opportunity setting that informs visitors of the diverse range of opportunities available in the forest. In Virginia, the area near the Appalachian Trail is designated "Appalachian Trail Corridor"; an area to the west side is "Backcountry-Non-Motorized", a "semi-primitive 2" area. The area in Tennessee is divided into three parts: "Remote Backcountry-Non-motorized", "Black Bear Habitat Management" and "Appalachian Trail Corridor".

== Cultural history ==
A partial survey of the area found seven cultural resource sites classified as Class II sites. They will require further evaluation to determine their eligibility for their registry in the National Register of Historic Places. In addition, three Class III sites were found, but as Class III sites they are not eligible for inclusion in the registry.
