= Cripple Creek, Virginia =

- Unincorporated community
- Location within Virginia Location within the United States
- Coordinates: 36°49′15″N 81°5′54″W
- Country: United States
- State: Virginia
- County: Wythe
- Elevation: 2,350 ft (720 m)
- Time zone: UTC-5 (Eastern (EST))
  - Summer (DST): UTC-4 (EDT)
- ZIP code: 24322
- GNIS feature ID: 1492826

Cripple Creek is an unincorporated community in Wythe County, Virginia, United States. The community's post office first opened in 1888 and closed in 2011. Early iron furnaces were constructed nearby ca.1800.

The area around Cripple Creek includes the creek known as Cripple Creek and was significant geologically. The Cripple Creek Valley was mined for iron ore and had furnaces and mills. Rail service came in the late 19th century. It now borders a large park and is used by anglers and hikers. Cripple Creek Road passes through the area. There is debate about whether the folk song "Cripple Creek" is about the area in Virginia or Colorado, both mining areas.

== See also ==
- Up on Cripple Creek (Song by The Band)
- Cripple Creek (folk song)
