= Mount Rogers National Recreation Area =

Recreational area in southwest Virginia, US

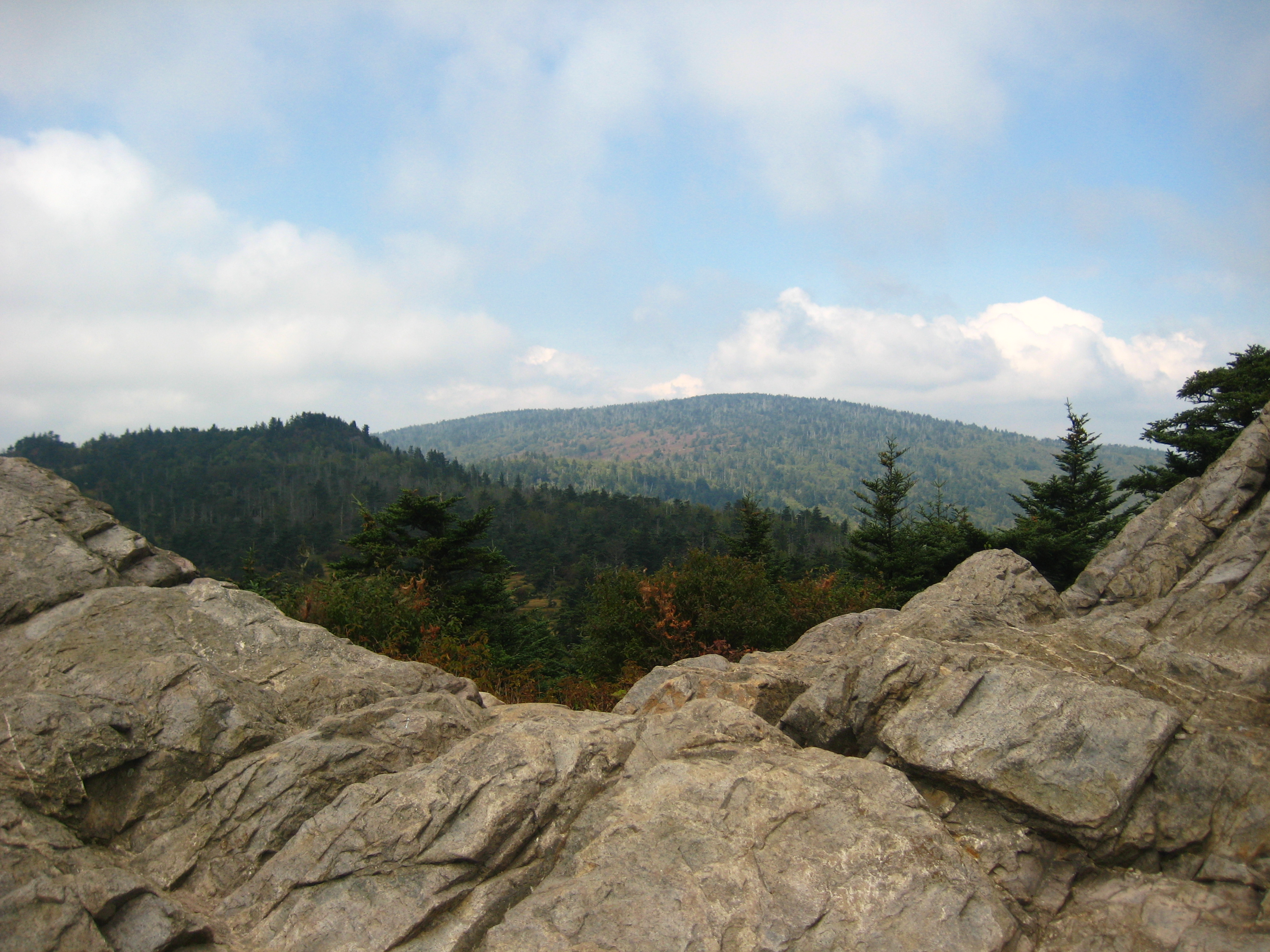
- Mount Rogers National Recreation Area, with Mount Rogers in the background

- Location within Virginia
- Interactive map of Mount Rogers National Recreation Area
- Location: Virginia, United States
- Coordinates: 36°38′46″N 81°34′58″W
- Area: 154,816 acres (626.52 km^{2})
- Elevation: 4,475 ft (1,364 m)
- Established: 1966-05-31
- Operator: George Washington and Jefferson National Forests
- Website: Mount Rogers National Recreation Area

Mount Rogers National Recreation Area is a United States national recreation area (NRA) in southwestern Virginia near the border with Tennessee and North Carolina. It centerpiece is the Lewis Fork Wilderness containing Mount Rogers, the highest point in the state of Virginia with a summit elevation of 5,729 feet (1746 m). The recreation area is under the jurisdiction of the George Washington and Jefferson National Forests. The recreation area was established by an act of the United States Congress on May 31, 1966.

Grayson Highlands State Park adjoins the recreation area on the south, near Mount Rogers, and the park provides the best known access to the peak and the NRA.

The recreation area is within the Mount Rogers Cluster.

== Hiking ==
There are nearly 400 miles (800 kilometers) of hiking trails within Mount Rogers NRA making it one of the premier hiking hotspots in the Appalachian Mountains. Some of the trails in Mount Rogers NRA include:

- A 78-mile (124.8 kilometer) segment of the Appalachian Trail. The Appalachian Trail itself does not reach the summit of Mount Rogers but rather passes about a half mile below it. A short spur trail leads hikers to the summit. As along the entire Appalachian Trail, there are several shelters for thru-hikers along this section of the trail.
- The Virginia Creeper Trail
- The shortest route to the summit of Mount Rogers is a 4.5-mile (7.2 km) hike from either Grayson Highlands State Park or from State Route 600 at Elk Garden.

== Wilderness ==
There are four federally designated wilderness areas in Mount Rogers NRA:

- Lewis Fork Wilderness, containing Mount Rogers itself
- Little Wilson Creek Wilderness
- Raccoon Branch Wilderness
- Little Dry Run Wilderness

Together, these four wilderness areas comprise about 18,500 acres of forest.

== Other activities ==
- Camping: There are seven campgrounds, four horse camps, and two rental cabins in the recreation area.
- Horseback riding
- Hunting
- Fishing
- Mountain biking
