= Ivey Foreman Lewis =

American geneticist (1882–1964)

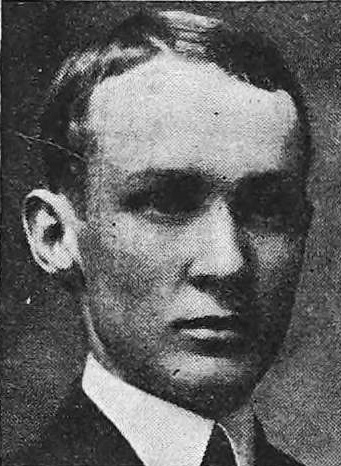
- Lewis c. 1902
- Born: August 31, 1882; Raleigh, North Carolina, U.S.
- Died: March 16, 1964 (aged 81); Charlottesville, Virginia, U.S.
- Education: University of North Carolina; Johns Hopkins University
- Scientific career
- Fields: Botany, genetics
- Workplaces: University of Virginia
- Author abbrev. (botany): I.F.Lewis

Ivey Foreman Lewis (August 31, 1882 – March 16, 1964) was an American botanist and geneticist who served for two decades as dean of the University of Virginia and helped found the Virginia Academy of Science. A proponent of eugenics throughout his career, in his final years, Lewis and his sister Nell Battle Lewis gained national attention for their opposition to racial desegregation in public education, especially the United States Supreme Court decisions in Brown v. Board of Education.

== Early life ==
Lewis was born in Raleigh, North Carolina to a prominent physician and public health official, Richard Henry Lewis. He had two brothers. His father remarried twice. He had a half sister Nell Battle Lewis. Lewis earned a B.S. (1902) and M.S. (1903) at the University of North Carolina, and later a PhD at Johns Hopkins University (1908).

== Career ==
During his own post-graduate studies through Johns Hopkins in Baltimore, Maryland, Lewis taught biology at Randolph–Macon College in Ashland, Virginia from 1905 to 1912. After he received his PhD, Lewis accepted a position as assistant professor of botany at the University of Wisconsin (1912 to 1914). He then taught as Professor of Botany at the University of Missouri from 1914 to 1915.

In 1915, University of Virginia president Edwin A. Alderman recruited Lewis, who became Professor of Biology and Agriculture, and began to modernize the institution and increase its research output. Lewis became popular at the university, as well as important in the state's scientific community—helping to found the Virginia Academy of Science and serving as its first president. Lewis was appointed dean of the university in 1934 and (after a reorganization), Dean of the College of Arts and Sciences in 1946, a position he held until his retirement in 1953.

Lewis's signature course was Biology C1: Evolution and Heredity. He provided much of the scientific rationale for the eugenics movement now best known for the discredited legal decision in Buck v. Bell (1927). In the 1920s, Lewis championed the state's Anglo-Saxon Clubs of America as staving off apocalyptic "racial decay", including giving a lecture "What Biology Says to the Man of Today." Lewis thus worked with alumnus John Powell, Major Earnest Sevier Cox and Dr. Walter Plecker (a physician who as state registrar vigorously enforced the 1924 Racial Integrity Act). Later, he consistently advised against hiring academicians who might question his group of eugenicists, or advocate environmental solutions to social problems, or even critically examine southern traditions, as well as criticized Jewish sociologists. Lewis had unsuccessfully opposed admission of Gregory Swanson, who matriculated at the university's law school in the fall of 1950 pursuant to a federal court order after the NAACP victories in Sweatt v. Painter and McLaurin v. Oklahoma State Regents, but Swanson left about a year later after encountering the "overwhelming climate of racial hostility and harassment" he had experienced. Thus, Walter N. Ridley, a professor at Virginia State College who arrived a semester after Swanson actually became the first recipient of a postgraduate degree at UVA (his PhD in education was the first such awarded to a Black man from a major Southern institution). During Virginia's massive resistance crisis, mostly after his retirement, Lewis attempted to "hold the line" and limit desegregation to token individuals, taking an active part in the radical Defenders of State Sovereignty and Individual Liberties.

Lewis was a fellow of the American Academy of Arts and Sciences, and served as president of the American Society of Naturalists (1939), American Biological Society (1942), and the Botanical Society of America (1949). The standard author abbreviation I.F.Lewis is used to indicate this person as the author when citing a botanical name.
