= Naomi Drake =

American statistics registrar

Naomi Ruth (née Mason Drake; 12 February 1907 – 22 February 1987) was an American who became notable in mid-20th century Louisiana as the Registrar of the Bureau of Vital Statistics for the City of New Orleans (1949–1965), where she imposed strict racial classifications on people under a binary system that recognized only "white" and "black" (or all other). She unilaterally changed records to classify mixed-race individuals as black if she found they had any black (or African) ancestry, an application of hypodescent rules, and did not notify people of her actions.

In other cases, if people would not accept her racial classification, she refused to release the requested birth or death certificate. Her insistence on changing records to classify persons of any suspected African descent was similar to the racial zealotry demonstrated by Dr. Walter Plecker, state registrar of Virginia's Vital Statistics, and a major lobbyist for its Racial Integrity Act of 1924.

== Career ==
In 1938, in Sunseri v, Cassagne (191 La. 209, 185 So. 1 - affirmed on rehearing in 1940, 195 La. 19, 196 So. 7) - the Louisiana Supreme Court proclaimed traceability of African ancestry to be the only requirement for definition of colored.

Drake began with the office as deputy and eventually became director. She directed race-flagging: she would check birth certificates that bore surnames common to blacks. If the baby was listed as white, she directed workers to check the certificate against a "race list" maintained by the Vital Records Office. If the name appeared on the "race list,"" the Vital Records Office conducted a further study of its genealogical records to reach its own assessment of the race of the individual and family. pp. 37–38

If the bureau determined through study of its genealogical records that the person in question had any African ancestors, the applicant was then informed that a certificate would be issued only if it declared the person to be colored. If the applicant refused to accept such a certificate, the bureau in turn refused to issue a certificate. There is evidence that between 1960 and 1965 a minimum of 4,700 applications for certificated copies of birth certificates and a minimum of 1,100 applications for death certificates were held in abeyance by the bureau under the supervision of Naomi Drake (188 So. 2nd 94) ...

Among the practices Drake directed was having her workers check obituaries. They were to assess whether the obituary of a person identified as white provided clues that might help show the individual was "really" black, such as having black relatives, services at a traditionally black funeral home, or burial at a traditionally black cemetery - evidence which she would use to ensure the death certificate classified the person as black.

Not everyone accepted Drake's actions, and people filed thousands of court cases against the office to have racial classifications changed and to protest her withholding legal documents of vital records. This caused much embarrassment and disruption, finally causing the city to fire her.

Drake was fired in 1965. In her hearing before the Civil Service Commission, she justified her office's changing records because they "knew" families were Negro. The practices did not cease with her exit.

From 1952–1954, Drake was the State President of the Business and Professional Women's organization.
