= Nodality =

In critical race theory, nodality is a framework for understanding how racialized groups are organized into relational nodes within a wider structure.

== Description ==
Each racial group is a node in a polyhedron, connected to all other nodes, with the white node in the center. Nodality critiques the two-dimensional black-white binary, polypolarity, and triangulation theories of race in favor of a multidimensional model. Instead of understanding racism as unidirectional from white to Black, nodality conceives racism as multidirectional between differentially racialized groups.
