= Marie Le Masson Le Golft =

French naturalist

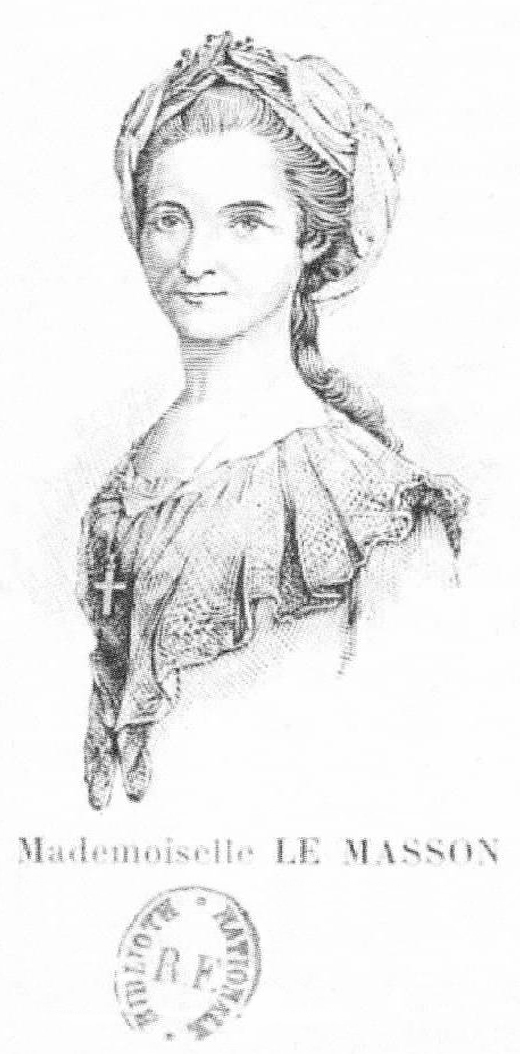
Marie Le Masson le Golft

Marie Le Masson Le Golft (25 October 1750 – 3 January 1826) was a French naturalist.

== Life ==
Marie Le Masson Le Golft was a student of naturalist Jacques-François Dicquemare, a friend of her father, in his scientific work. She tried to publish the great work he had undertaken on molluscs, but the cost of publishing thwarted her every attempt. These numerous attempts put her in touch with such late 18th century scientists as Bernard Germain de Lacépède, Nicolas de Condorcet or Louis-Jean-Marie Daubenton.

She was a teacher, and in 1788 published Letters on Education, as well as writing further, unpublished works. Two of her books are still cited: the Balance of Nature (1784), where she assigned grades to hundreds of animals, plants and minerals, and A General Sketch of Mankind (1787), a world map on which all peoples then known and their characteristics are represented by symbols.

Masson spent the last years of her life poor and almost forgotten in Rouen, where she was a professor of geography and drawing. At her death, she bequeathed to the city of Rouen her personal library, which included the collection of drawings, engravings and copper plates that were to be used in the publication of Dicquemare's book.

She was a member of several provincial academies, as well as the Madrid Royal Academy of Education, Cercle des Philadelphes du Cap-Français, and the Royal Society of Bilbao.

== Works ==
- Entretien sur Le Havre, Le Havre, chez les libraires, 1781.
- Balance de la nature, Paris, chez Barois l'aîné, 1784 (rééditée par Marc Décimo, Préface La femme qui notait la Nature, Les presses du réel, 2005)
- Esquisse d'un tableau général du genre humain, planisphère imprimé par Moithey, ingénieur-géographe du roi, 1787.
- Le Havre au jour le jour de 1778 à 1790, Éd. Philippe Manneville, Rouen, Société de l'histoire de Normandie, 1999 (procure les Annales de la ville du Havre rédigées par Marie Le Masson Le Golft entre 1778 et 1790, ainsi que des extraits de l' Entretien sur Le Havre .)
- Lettres relatives à l'éducation, Paris, Buisson, 1788

== Sources ==
- George Kish, Une mappemonde anthropologique du XVIII e siècle, « Esquisse d'un tableau général du genre humain », Florence, Società di studi geografici, 1982.
- ( en ) Josef Konvitz, The Enlightened Taste of Marie Le Masson Le Golft, Petits propos culinaires.
- ( en ) Bridgette Byrd O'Connor, Marie Le Masson Le Golft, 1749-1826 : Eighteenth-Century Educator, Historian, and Natural Philosopher, Thèse de doctorat de l'Université d'Oxford, 2005
- Cyril Le Meur, Notice dans le Dictionnaire en ligne des Femmes de l'Ancienne France, sur le site de la Société internationale pour l'étude des femmes de l'Ancien Régime .
- Cyril Le Meur, « Marie Le Masson Le Golft dans sa petite Ithaque, ou le parcours intellectuel d'une Havraise au tournant des Lumières », Dix-huitième siècle, La femme des Lumières, n o 36, 2004.
- Cyril Le Meur, Épigones provinciaux de l'écriture apologétique de la nature : l'abbé Dicquemare et Marie Le Masson Le Golft, Actes du colloque Écrire la nature au XVIII e siècle. Autour de l'abbé Pluche, Presses universitaires de Paris-Sorbonne, 2006.
- Noémi-Noire Oursel, Une Havraise oubliée, Marie Le Masson Le Golft, Évreux, Imprimerie de l'Eure, 1908.
