= Binary opposition =

Pair of related terms or concepts that are opposite in meaning

A binary opposition (also binary system) is a pair of related terms or concepts that are opposite in meaning. Binary opposition is the system of language or thought by which two theoretical opposites are strictly defined and set off against one another. It is the contrast between two mutually exclusive terms, such as on and off, up and down, left and right. Binary opposition is an important concept of structuralism, which sees such distinctions as fundamental to all language and thought. In structuralism, a binary opposition is seen as a fundamental organizer of human philosophy, culture, and language.

Binary opposition originated in Saussurean structuralist theory. According to Ferdinand de Saussure, the binary opposition is the means by which the units of language have value or meaning; each unit is defined in reciprocal determination with another term, as in binary code. For instance, 'hot' gains meaning because of its relation to 'cold,' and vice versa. It is not a contradictory relation but a structural, complementary one. Saussure demonstrated that a sign's meaning is derived from its context (syntagmatic dimension) and the group (paradigm) to which it belongs. An example of this is that one cannot conceive of 'good' if we do not understand 'evil'.

Typically, one of the two opposites assumes a role of dominance over the other. The categorization of binary oppositions is "often value-laden and ethnocentric", with an illusory order and superficial meaning. Furthermore, Pieter Fourie discovered that binary oppositions have a deeper or second level of binaries that help to reinforce meaning. As an example, the concepts hero and villain involve secondary binaries: good/bad, handsome/ugly, liked/disliked, and so on.

== Theory of binaries ==
A classic example of binary opposition is the presence-absence dichotomy. According to structuralism, distinguishing between presence and absence, viewed as polar opposites, is a fundamental element of thought in many cultures. In addition, according to post-structuralist criticisms, presence occupies a position of dominance in human society over absence, because absence is traditionally seen as what you get when you take away presence. (Were absence dominant, presence might have most traditionally been seen as what you get when you take away absence.)

According to Jacques Derrida, meaning is often defined in terms of binary oppositions, where "one of the two terms governs the other."

An example of binary opposition is the male–female dichotomy. A post-structuralist view is that male can be seen, according to traditional thought, as dominant over female because male is the presence of a phallus, while the vagina is an absence or loss. American philosopher John Searle has suggested that the concept of binary oppositions—as taught and practiced by postmodernists and poststructuralists—is specious and lacking in rigor.

== Deconstruction of binaries ==
The political (rather than analytic or conceptual) critique of binary oppositions is an important part of third wave feminism, post-colonialism, post-anarchism, and critical race theory, which argue that the perceived binary dichotomy between man/woman, civilized/uncivilised, and white/black have perpetuated and legitimized societal power structures favoring a specific majority. In the last fifteen years it has become routine for many social and/or historical analyses to address the variables of gender, class, sexuality, race and ethnicity. Within each of these categories there is usually an unequal binary opposition: bourgeoisie/working-class man; men/women; heterosexual/homosexual. In critical race theory, the paradigm is known as the black–white binary.

Post-structural criticism of binary oppositions is not simply the reversal of the opposition, but its deconstruction, which is described as apolitical—that is, not intrinsically favoring one arm of a binary opposition over the other. Deconstruction is the "event" or "moment" at which a binary opposition is thought to contradict itself, and undermine its own authority.

Deconstruction assumes that all binary oppositions need to be analyzed and criticized in all their manifestations; the function of both logical and axiological oppositions must be studied in all discourses that provide meaning and values. But deconstruction does not only expose how oppositions work and how meaning and values are produced in a nihilistic or cynic position, "thereby preventing any means of intervening in the field effectively". To be effective, and simply as its mode of practice, deconstruction creates new notions or concepts, not to synthesize the terms in opposition but to mark their difference, undecidability, and eternal interplay.

== In relation to logocentrism ==
Logocentrism is an idea related to binary opposition that suggests certain audiences will favor one part of a binary opposition pair over the other. This favoritism is often most strongly influenced by readers' cultural backgrounds.

An example of such logocentrism is the strong patriarchal themes in 'The Women and the Pot', an Amharic folktale that tells the story of two women who are upset at their diminished role in society, and who consequently go to their King for help. He effectively conveys the message that women cannot be relied upon to take on a greater role in society, which becomes the moral of the tale. Prasad explains this idea: "The logocentric value is seen through the 'Eternal Knowledge'—the naturalness of male superiority—that is conveyed through the folktale. The hidden a priori binary opposition is 'Man over Woman'." In relation to the cultural heritage of an audience having an influence on their unconscious preference for one part of binary opposition, Prasad says; "By way of studying a selection of Ethiopian folktales, the paper uncovers the presence of logocentrism and a priori binary opposition being at work in Ethiopian folktales. These two elements attempt to endorse and validate the 'given' subservient position of women in society".

== In literature ==
Binary opposition is deeply embedded within literature as language, and paired opposites, rely upon a relation with adjoining words inside a paradigmatic chain. If one of the paired opposites were removed the other's precise meaning would be altered.

== See also ==
- Antinomy
- Dichotomy
- Gender binary
- Opposite (semantics)
- Polarization (politics)
- Yin and yang
