= Médéric Louis Élie Moreau de Saint-Méry =

French lawyer, writer and politician

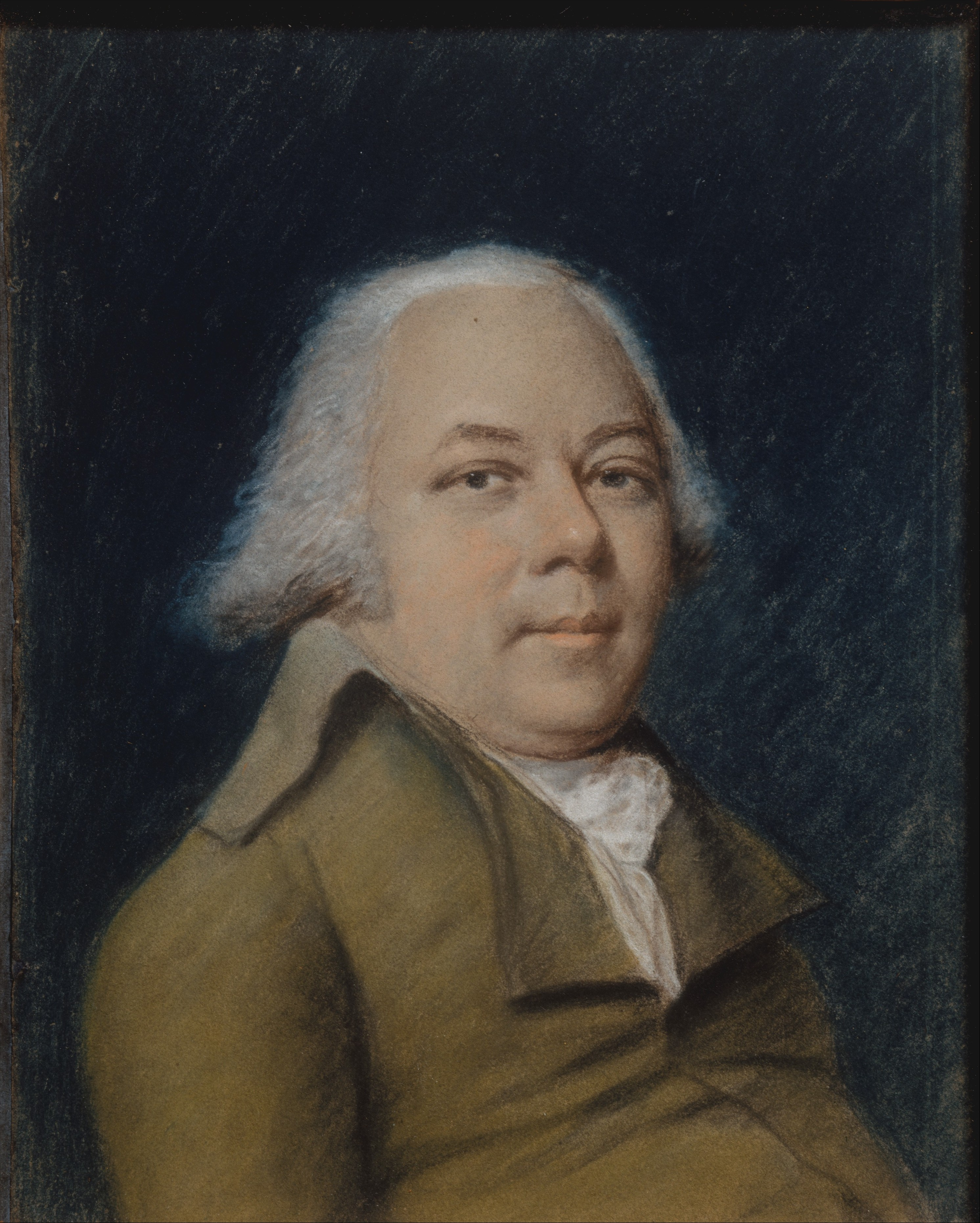
Pastel portrait of Moreau by James Sharples.

Médéric Louis Élie Moreau de Saint-Méry (13 January 1750 – 28 January 1819) was a French lawyer, writer and politician. Born in Martinique in the commune of Fort-Royale, he spent his life in the French West Indies, France and the United States, and is best known for his writings on Saint-Domingue and Martinique. Moreau married into an influential family, which allowed him to increase his acquaintances in France and in time be elected as a member of the Parliament of France. Moreau was also a prominent advocate of proslavery thought in France.

== Education and influences ==
Although he did not come from a family of significant means, Moreau used an inheritance he received from his grandfather to study law in Paris. There he argued that colonial law, drafted in France, was not appropriate for the realities of the French Caribbean. He owned slaves, was a freemason and a member of the Cercle des Philadelphes – a colonial scientific society – and sought to document life in the colonies. He was influenced by the scientific projects of the Enlightenment.

== Writings ==
Moreau produced in-depth studies of the colonies only years before St-Domingue's revolution. As such, he spent time traveling in the Caribbean and returning to France to write and lobby until his involvement with the French Revolution resulted in the issuing of a warrant for his arrest. His most notable work, Description topographique, physique, civile, politique et historique de la partie française de l’isle Saint-Domingue, which he wrote in 1789, has not been fully translated into English. This work develops an arithmetic theory of skin color and the epidermis for the French colony of Saint-Domingue (now Haiti). It hierarchizes a possible one hundred and twenty-eight possible combinations of black-white miscegenation into nine categories (the sacatra, the griffe, the marabout, the mulâtre, the quarteron, the métis, the mamelouk, the quarteronné, and the sang-melé). His work represents a preoccupation of white colonists with racializing those who intermarry and interbreed with slaves or free gens de couleur, establishing the caste of white colonists as l'aristocratie de l’épiderme.

== Politics ==
A well-educated slave owner, he rejected the principle of the Natural Rights of Man in order to defend legal slavery and segregation on the basis of race. In his roles in the French parliament and on the colonial Governing Boards, he sought to maintain an economic system based on slave labor. To this end, he pursued the rights of colonists – mostly white planters – and sought a degree of self-determination for the French Caribbean. Moreau returned to France in 1788, where he became part of the Estates General which later renamed themselves the National Assembly. There he represented the planters in Saint-Domingue and advocated slavery, confronting the Society of the Friends of the Blacks. He had an important rople in the founding of the Museum of Paris of which he was later appointed president in 1787. After his return to France in 1798, after his exile in the United States, Moreau's first job was that of a historian in the Ministry of the Marine. A couple years later, in 1802 he became administrator of the Duchy of Parma, Piacenza, and Gustalla, but later he was dismissed from office by Napoleon because of his lenient response towards a criminal conspiracy among the army.

== Moreau in the United States ==
Moreau escaped Paris after a warrant for his arrest was issued in 1794. He relocated to Philadelphia after a short stay in New York City, leaving all his research on the Colony of Saint-Domingue behind, which he later was able to recover. In Philadelphia, he opened a bookstore in which he sold books and prints in many languages, as well as maps and music. The bookstore located at Front and Walnut streets became the meeting location for many other French exiles. Moreau became a member of the American Philosophical Society in 1798, to which he was committed, and introduced many of his émigré friends into the Society as well. Moreau had to flee back to Paris in 1798, escaping the Alien and Sedition Acts imposed by the American president at the time, John Adams.

== Bibliography ==
- Dubois, Laurent (2004). Avengers of the New World: The Story of the Haitian Revolution. The Belknap Press of Harvard University Press.
- Furstenberg, François (2014). When the United States Spoke French: Five Refugees Who Shaped a Nation. New York: Penguin, 2014.
- Moreau de Saint-Méry, Médéric Louis (1958). Description topographique, physique, civile, politique et historique de la partie française de l’isle Saint-Domingue. Société de l’histoire des colonies françaises.
- Taffin, Dominique, ed. (2006). Moreau de Saint-Méry ou les ambiguïtés d’un créole des Lumières. Martinique: Société des amis des archives et de la recherché sur le patrimoine culturel des Antilles.
- Rosengarten, Joseph G. “Moreau De Saint Mery and His French Friends in the American Philosophical Society.” Proceedings of the American Philosophical Society, vol. 50, no. 199, 1911, pp. 168–178., www.jstor.org/stable/984032.
- "Mederic-Louis-Elie Moreau De Saint-Mery." Dictionary of American Biography, Charles Scribner's Sons, 1936. Biography in Context, http://link.galegroup.com/apps/doc/BT2310007190/BIC1?u=miam11506&xid=f2c2d99c. Accessed 12 Mar. 2017.
