= John Powell (musician) =

American pianist, ethnomusicologist and composer (1882–1963)

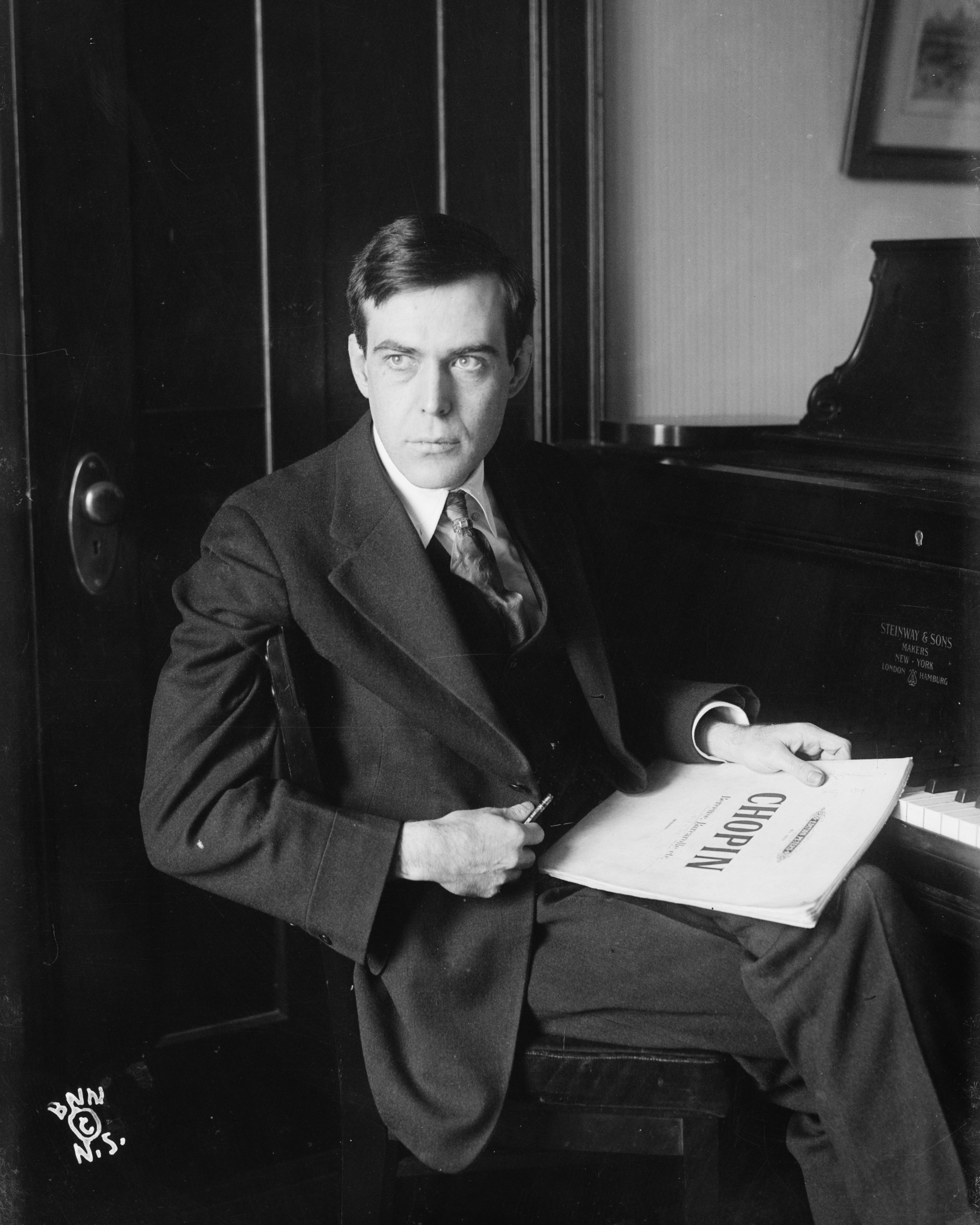
- Powell in 1916
- Born: September 6, 1882; Richmond, Virginia, US
- Died: August 15, 1963 (aged 80); Richmond, Virginia, US
- Education: University of Virginia
- Occupations: Pianist, composer

John Powell (September 6, 1882 – August 15, 1963) was an American pianist, ethnomusicologist and composer. Along with Annabel Morris Buchanan, he helped found the White Top Folk Festival, which promoted music of the people in the Appalachian Mountains. A firm believer in segregation, eugenics and white supremacy, Powell also helped found the Anglo-Saxon Clubs of America, which soon had numerous posts in Virginia. He contributed to the drafting and passage of the Racial Integrity Act of 1924, which institutionalized the one-drop rule by classifying as black (colored) anyone with African ancestry.

== Early life and education ==
Powell was born and grew up in Richmond, Virginia. He graduated from the University of Virginia in 1901 and studied piano with Theodor Leschetizky and composition in Vienna with composer Karel Navrátil. He made his debut as a concert pianist in 1908 in Berlin.

== Music career ==
Powell became a world-renowned composer. He had a racialist approach to music, which he expressed in his writings. He was interested in Appalachian folk music and championed its performance and preservation. He was one of the founders of the White Top Folk Festival, held in Grayson County, Virginia annually from 1931 to 1939.

== Political activism ==
Powell's ideology—and musicology—were strongly racialist and anti-black, a topic which served as the subject for many of his essays. In the fall of 1922 together with Earnest Sevier Cox (a self-proclaimed ethnologist and explorer) and Dr. Walter Plecker, Powell founded the Anglo-Saxon Clubs of America in Richmond, Virginia. They worked closely with Walter Ashby Plecker to promote state legislation to classify people simply as "white" or "negro", and to end "amalgamation" of the races by intermarriage. The activities of the club split the elite in Virginia, which had tried to take pride in its "genteel paternalism" in controlling racial relations. The clubs attracted more racists.

Within a year, more than 400 white men had joined as members and the club had 31 "posts" in Virginia, including two in Charlottesville, one for the town and one at the University of Virginia. Powell worked with Dr. Plecker, the state's registrar of statistics, to draft the Racial Integrity Act of 1924. The club members were successful in lobbying the legislature to gain passage of the act, which classified as black any person with any African ancestry, although the previous law recognized persons with one-sixteenth or less black ancestry as white.

== Death and legacy ==
Powell died in Albemarle County, Virginia near Charlottesville, and was buried at Hollywood cemetery in Richmond.

Radford University named its arts and music hall after Powell, honoring his championing of Appalachian music. However, in 2005, Prof. Richard Straw's Appalachian Studies class at the university discovered Powell's role in white supremacy and brought it to the attention of administrators. The school developed a plan to rename the hall but did not implement it at the time.

In 2010, Christian Trejbal, a columnist for The Roanoke Times, contacted the university about why the hall had not been renamed, prompting officials to take up the issue again. The University Board of Visitors voted to remove Powell's name, merging the hall with Porterfield Hall, to which it was already physically connected.

== Selected compositions ==
- Piano music:
  - In the south, op. 16
  - At the fair (1907)
  - Sonata noble, op. 21 (1907-8)
  - Sonata teutonica for piano, op. 24 (admired by Kaikhosru Shapurji Sorabji). Premiered by Benno Moiseiwitsch in London in 1914. Published and recorded in an abridged edition.
- Piano Concerto, Op.13
- Violin Sonata, Op.19
- Violin Concerto in E, Op.23 (premiered by Efrem Zimbalist, 1912, New York)
- String Quartet, E minor (see John Powell Sound Archives)
- Rhapsodie Nègre for piano and orchestra
- Symphony in A major (Virginia Symphony) (1945, rev. 1951) (recorded)
