= Walter Plecker =

American physician, eugenicist, and white supremacist activist (1861–1947)

- Walter Plecker at the Bureau of Vital Statistics in 1935

Registrar for the Virginia Bureau of Vital Statistics
- In office 1912–1946

Personal details
- Born: April 2, 1861 Augusta County, Virginia, U.S.
- Died: August 2, 1947 (aged 86) Richmond, Virginia, U.S.

Walter Ashby Plecker (April 2, 1861 – August 2, 1947) was an American physician and public health advocate who was the first registrar of Virginia's Bureau of Vital Statistics, serving from 1912 to 1946. He was a leader of the Anglo-Saxon Clubs of America, a white supremacist organization founded in Richmond, Virginia, in 1922. A eugenicist and proponent of scientific racism, Plecker drafted and lobbied for the passage of the Racial Integrity Act of 1924 by the Virginia legislature; it institutionalized the one-drop rule.

Plecker was killed after being struck by a car in 1947.

== Early life and education ==
Plecker was born in Augusta County, Virginia in April 1861, shortly before Virginia seceded from the Union and the beginning of the American Civil War. His father was a slave owner who fought in the Confederate States Army. After being sent to Staunton as a boy, he graduated from Hoover Military Academy in 1880 and obtained a medical degree from the University of Maryland in 1885. He was a devout Presbyterian, and throughout his life, he supported the denomination's fundamentalist southern branch, funding missionaries who believed, as he later would, that God had destroyed Sodom and Gomorrah as punishment for racial intermixing.

== Career ==
Plecker settled in Hampton, Virginia, in 1892, and before his mother's death in 1915, he worked with women of all races and became known for his active interest in obstetrics and public health issues. Plecker educated midwives, invented a home incubator, and prescribed home remedies for infants. Plecker became the public health officer for Elizabeth City County in 1902.

In 1912, Plecker became the first registrar of Virginia's newly created Bureau of Vital Statistics, a position he held until 1946. An avowed white supremacist and an advocate of eugenics, he became a leader of the Anglo-Saxon Clubs of America in 1922. He wanted to prevent miscegenation, or marriage between races, and he also thought that a decreasing number of mulattoes, as classified in the census, meant that more of them were passing as white.

With the help of John Powell and Earnest Sevier Cox, Plecker drafted and the state legislature passed the "Racial Integrity Act of 1924". It recognized only two races, "white" and "colored" (black). It essentially incorporated the one-drop rule, classifying any individual with any amount of African ancestry as "colored". This went beyond existing laws, which had classified persons who had one-sixteenth (equivalent to one great-great-grandparent) or less black ancestry as white. In 1967, the United States Supreme Court invalidated the law in Loving v. Virginia.

In particular, Plecker resented African Americans who passed as Native Americans, and he came to firmly believe that the state's Native Americans had been "mongrelized" with its African American population. In fact, since shortly after the Civil War, Native Americans from all over the country had been brought to the Hampton area to be educated alongside blacks, at times inter-marrying, although Hampton's Indian schools had closed down as racial discrimination against Native Americans and the eugenics movement both grew in the state. Plecker refused to recognize the fact that many mixed-race Virginia Indians had maintained their culture and identity as Native Americans over the centuries despite economic assimilation. Plecker ordered state agencies to reclassify most citizens who claimed American Indian identity as "colored", although many Virginian Native Americans continued to live in their communities and maintained their tribal practices. Church records, for instance, continued to identify them as Native Americans. Specifically, Plecker ordered state agencies to reclassify certain families whom he identified by surname, because he decided that they were trying to pass and evade segregation. This remained legal in the South until, in the 1960s, it was overturned by federal legislation.

In addition, Plecker lobbied the US Census Bureau to drop the category "mulatto" in the 1930 and later censuses. This deprived mixed-race people of recognition of their identity and it also contributed to a binary culture of hypodescent, in which mixed-race persons were often classified as part of the group with lower social status.

Plecker sympathized with Nazi eugenics efforts. In 1935, a decade after the passage of Virginia's eugenics laws, he wrote to Walter Gross, director of Nazi Germany's Office for Enlightenment on Population Policy and Racial Welfare. Plecker described Virginia's racial purity laws and requested to be put on Gross' mailing list. Following the Third Reich's sterilization of 600 Rhineland bastards, children in the Rhineland who were born of German women by Black French colonial fathers, Plecker commented: "I hope this work is complete and not one has been missed. I sometimes regret that we have not the authority to put some measures in practice in Virginia." In 1943, Plecker remarked, "Our own indexed birth and marriage records, showing race, reach back to 1853. Such a study has probably never been made before. Your staff member is probably correct in his surmise that Hitler’s genealogical study of the Jews is not more complete."

== Death ==
On August 2, 1947, Plecker was struck by a car while crossing a Richmond street, killing him, less than a year after his retirement. He was buried in Richmond's Hollywood Cemetery beside his wife, who had died more than a decade earlier. They had no children.

For years Plecker never sought out friends, and he described his hobbies as "books and birds", and he gained a reputation for never smiling. His obituary in the Richmond Afro-American newspaper was headlined: "Dr. Plecker, 86, Rabid Racist, Killed by Auto".

Plecker's racial policies continue to cause problems for the descendants of what are sometimes called the First Virginians. Members of eight Virginia-recognized tribes struggle to achieve federal recognition because they cannot prove their continuity of heritage through historic documentation, as federal laws require. First encountering European Americans during the colonial period, the tribes mostly had treaties with the King of England rather than with the United States government. Plecker's policies destroyed and altered records that individuals and families need in order to prove their cultural continuity as Indians. In 2007, the House of Representatives passed a law to recognize six Virginia tribes at the Federal level. In January 2018, the Senate passed the bill and President Donald Trump signed it into law.

== See also ==
- Hypodescent
- Indian blood
- Institutional racism
- One-drop rule
- Racial Integrity Act of 1924
- Racism
