= Samarcand Arson Case of 1931 =

1931 criminal case in North Carolina, United States

On March 12, 1931, the Samarcand Manor State Industrial Training School for Girls, located twenty miles away from Carthage, North Carolina, was set on fire. Ultimately, 16 teenage students were charged with attempted arson.

The incident occurred at dusk. Two buildings, Bickett Hall and Chamberlain Discipline Hall, were completely destroyed, causing more than $100,000 worth of damage.

== Aftermath and trial ==
Sixteen suspects between the ages of thirteen and eighteen were charged the following day with arson, at the time a capital crime in the state of North Carolina. The girls had a taste for fire—one group, in jail in Robeson County, destroyed their cells, tearing up their bunks and setting them afire. Another, jailed in Carthage, NC, torched their beds and attacked the firefighter who arrived to fight the blaze. Transferred to the Moore County jail, the same group started a fire there, too. A week later, they were on trial for first-degree arson.

Journalist, death penalty opponent, and newly minted lawyer Nell Battle Lewis agreed to take the case as defense attorney. Through a plea bargain, in exchange for a guilty plea, the charges were reduced to attempted arson. Twelve of the sixteen girls received adult sentences of eighteen months to five years, two were discharged and two received suspended sentences.
