= Quadroon =

Historical racial classification

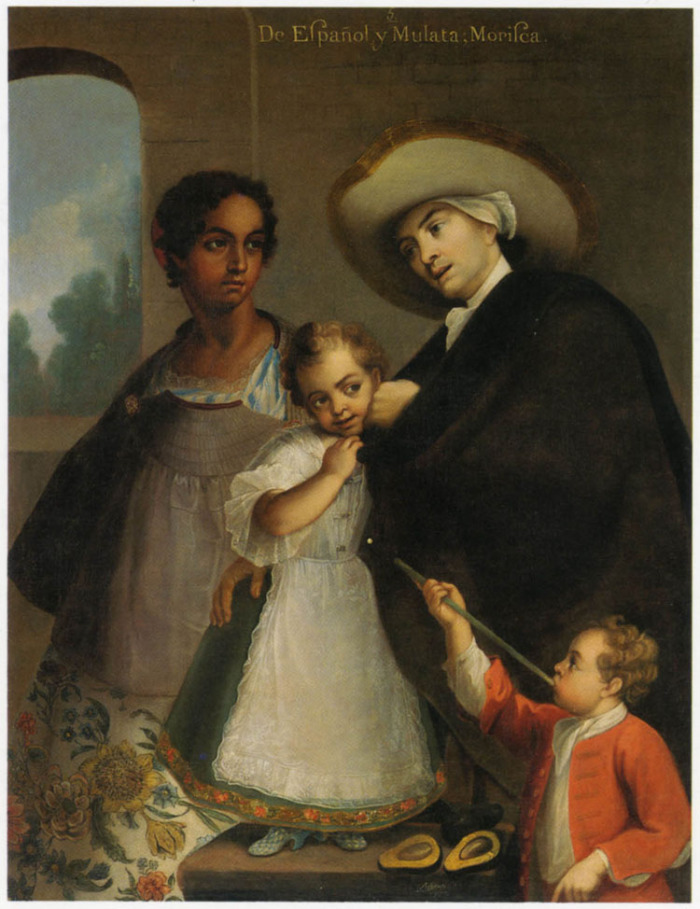
1763 casta painting by Miguel Cabrera depicting in the centre a quadroon child

In the colonial societies of the Americas and Australia, a Quadroon (/kwɑːˈdruːn/ kwah-DROON) or Quarteron (Quarter-Caste in the United Kingdom and Australia) was a person with one-quarter Sub-Saharan African or Indigenous Australian ancestry, and three-quarters European ancestry. Similar classifications were Octoroon for one-eighth Black and Quintroon for one-sixteenth Black.

Governments of the time sometimes incorporated the terms in law, defining rights and restrictions. The use of such terminology is a characteristic of hypodescent, which is the practice within a society of assigning children of mixed unions to the ethnic group which the dominant group perceives as being subordinate. The racial designations refer specifically to the number of full-blooded African ancestors or equivalent, emphasizing the quantitative least, with Quadroon signifying that a person has one-quarter Black ancestry.

== Etymology ==
The word Quadroon was borrowed from the French quarteron and the Spanish cuarterón, both of which have their root in the Latin quartus, meaning "a quarter".

Similarly, the Spanish cognate Cuarterón is used to describe Quarterón de Mulato or Morisco (someone whose racial origin is three-quarters white and one-quarter Black) and Cuarterón de Mestizo or Castizo (someone whose racial origin is three-quarters white and one-quarter Amerindian), especially in Caribbean South America.

== Racial classifications ==
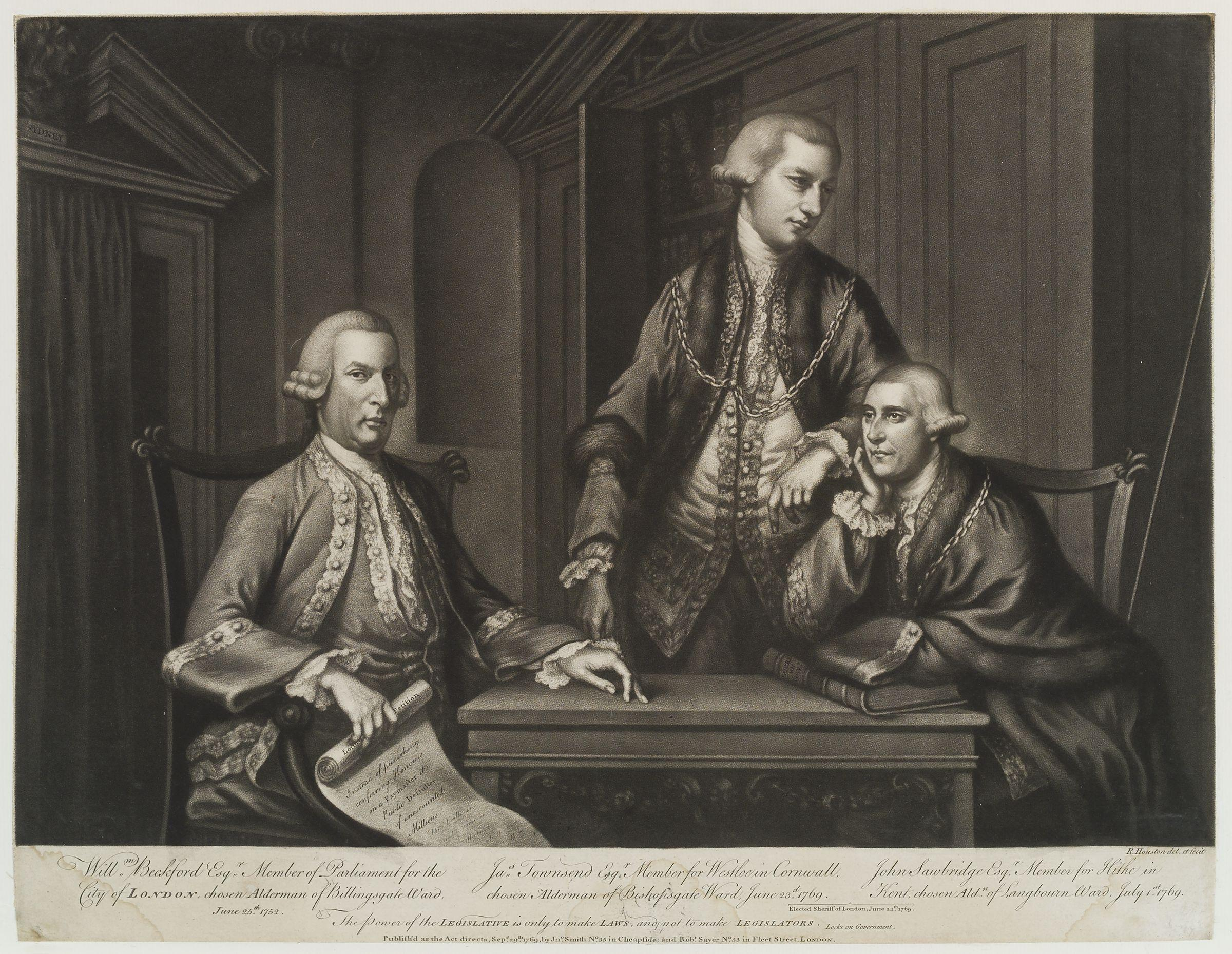
James Townsend (centre), who was an Octoroon

Quadroon was used to designate a person of one-quarter African/Aboriginal ancestry, that is equivalent to one biracial parent (African/Aboriginal and Caucasian) and one white or European parent; in other words, the equivalent of one African/Aboriginal grandparent and three white or European grandparents. In some countries in Latin America, which had a variety of terms for racial groups, some terms for Quadroons were Morisco or Chino, see Casta. Terceroon was a term synonymous with Quadroon, derived from being three generations of descent from an African ancestor, counting the ancestor as the first generation.

The term Mulatto was used to designate a person who was biracial, with one fully Black parent and one fully white parent, or a person whose parents are both Mulatto. In some cases, it was used as a general term, for instance on U.S. census classifications, to refer to all persons of mixed race, without regard for proportion of ancestries. The only time a more specific classification was utilized was in the 1890 census, which counted almost a million Mulattoes (defined as 3/8 to 5/8 white), over 100,000 Quadroons and slightly under 70,000 Octoroons among 7.5 million Black people; however, the Census Bureau concluded from the experience that this kind of distinction is unreliable and "of little value" so it was abandoned.

The term Octoroon referred to a person with one-eighth African/Aboriginal ancestry; that is, someone with family heritage equivalent to one biracial grandparent; in other words, one African great-grandparent and seven European great-grandparents. An example was Russian poet Alexander Pushkin. Octoroon was applied to a limited extent in Australia for those of one-eighth Aboriginal ancestry, as the government implemented assimilation policies on the Stolen Generations. The term Mustee was also used to refer to a person with one-eighth African ancestry.

The term Sacatra was used to refer to one who was seven-eighths Black or African and one-eighth white or European (i.e. an individual with one Black and one Griffe parent, or one white great-grandparent).

The term Mustefino refers to a person with one-sixteenth African ancestry. The terms Quintroon or Hexadecaroon were also used.

In the French Antilles, the following terms were used during the 18th century:

Black ancestry	Saint-Domingue	Guadeloupe/Martinique
7/8	Sacatra	-
3/4	Griffe	Capre
5/8	Marabou	-
1/2	Mulâtre	Mulâtre
1/4	Quarteron	Métis
1/8	Métis	Quarteron
1/16	Mamelouk	Mamelouk
1/32	Quarteronné	-
1/64	Sang-mêlé	-

In some countries in Latin America, the terms Griffe or Sambo were sometimes used for an individual of three-quarters Black parentage, i.e. the child of a Mulatto parent and a fully Black parent.

== Depiction in media ==
In the period before the American Civil War, mixed-race slaves with predominantly white features were depicted in photos and other media to show whites that some slaves were visually indistinguishable from themselves, thus preventing them from seeing slaves as an ethnic "other", in order to further the abolition movement.

== See also ==
- Afro-Latin American
- Anglo-Indian
- Indian South Africans
- Baster
- Casta
- Children of the plantation
- Coloured
- Discrimination based on skin color, a.k.a. colorism
- High yellow
- Miscegenation
- Mischling
- Morisco – term for quadroons in Spanish colonies
- Multiracial
- One-drop rule
- Passing (racial identity)
- Racial hygiene
- Sacatra
- Sally Hemings
