= Nell Battle Lewis =

American journalist (1893–1956)

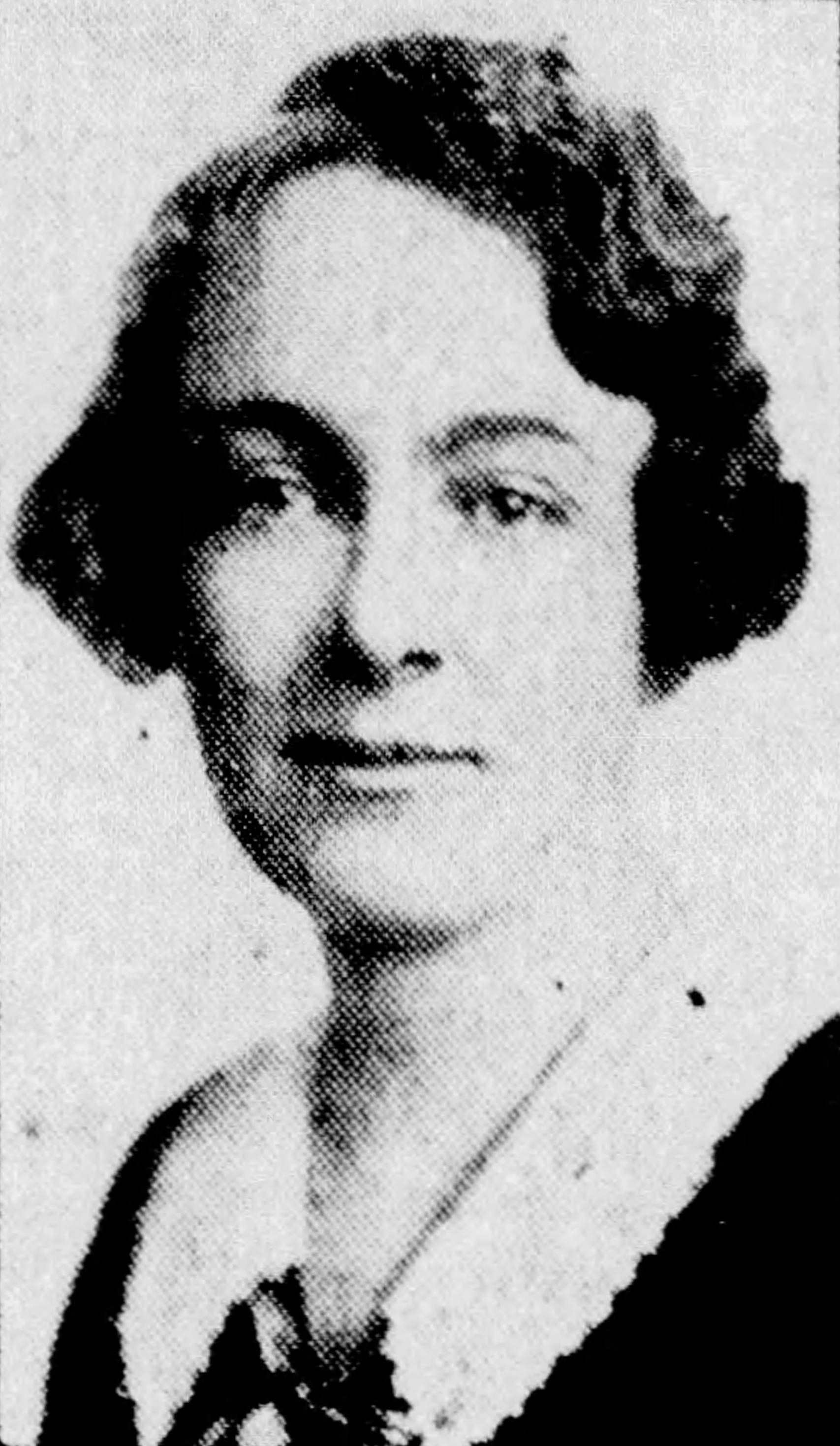
- Lewis c. 1930
- Born: Cornelia Battle Lewis; May 28, 1893; Raleigh, North Carolina, U.S.
- Died: 26 November 1956 (aged 63); Raleigh, North Carolina, U.S.
- Education: Smith College
- Relatives: Ivey Foreman Lewis (brother); Kemp Plummer Lewis (brother)

Cornelia "Nell" Battle Lewis (May 28, 1893 – November 26, 1956) was an American journalist and lawyer in North Carolina. She was an advocate for worker's and women's rights, and at the end of her career the threat of communism, and perhaps the best known female advocate for racial segregation.

== Early life and education ==
Cornelia Battle Lewis was born in Raleigh, North Carolina, the daughter of Richard Henry Lewis, a doctor and medical school professor. Her mother was Mary Gordon Lewis, who died when Nell was three years old. She was named for her father's first wife, Cornelia Battle, and raised in the home of her father's third wife, Annie Blackwell Lewis. Nell's older brother was botanist Ivey Foreman Lewis. Nell's half brother Kent Plummer Lewis was a member of University of North Carolina's first consolidated board of trustees.

She graduated from high school at St. Mary's School in Raleigh in 1911, and earned an undergraduate degree at Smith College in 1917.

== Career ==
Immediately after college she worked about a year with the National City Bank in New York City. In 1918, she went to France as part of the YWCA's wartime work for American forces there. She was back in North Carolina by 1920 working at the Raleigh News and Observer. Initially Lewis edited the Society Page and wrote feature articles and a children's page. Her long-running weekly column, "Incidentally," launched in 1921, making her that newspaper's first female columnist. Running for forty-five years, "Incidentally" covered many topics including Lewis' positive views on race science and eugenics (some data used in these pieces came from her brother Ivey Foreman Lewis). She was known as "Battling Nell" for her many efforts for the rights of white women, workers' rights, improved education and public health in North Carolina.

Outside her newspaper work, Lewis did publicity work for the Board of Charities and Public Welfare, the League of Women Voters, the State Federation of Women's Clubs, and the Legislative Council. She ran unsuccessfully for the state legislature in 1928. In 1929, she was admitted to the North Carolina bar. She did not practice law full-time, but used her qualifications to defend a group of women's reformatory inmates accused of arson. She published a report on the practice of capital punishment in North Carolina. Her ongoing writing projects included a textbook, a biography of Dorothea Dix, and a novel.

Later in her career Lewis wrote regularly about the threat of communism at the University of North Carolina, and the importance of racial segregation in Southern schools. She praised the Confederacy, stating, "The Confederate flag is a beautiful flag, the most moving in the world."

== Personal life ==
Lewis died in 1956, aged 63 years, after a heart attack. Her gravesite is in Oakwood Cemetery in Raleigh. Some of her papers are archived in the North Carolina state archives.

A biography of Lewis, Battling Nell: The Life of Southern Journalist Nell Battle Lewis, 1893-1956 by Alexander S. Leidholdt, was published by Louisiana State University Press.
