= Hypodescent =

Assuming the socially lower ancestry

In societies that regard some races or ethnic groups of people as dominant or superior and others as subordinate or inferior, hypodescent refers to the automatic assignment of children of a mixed union to the subordinate group. The opposite practice is hyperdescent, in which children are assigned to the race that is considered dominant or superior.

Parallel practices include patrilineality, matrilineality, and cognatic descent, which assign race, ethnicity, or religion according to the father, mother, or some combination, without regard to the race of the other parent. These systems determine group membership based on the gender of the parent rather than the social dominance of the group, and thus can be hypodescent or hyperdescent depending on the genders of the parents and the views of the culture in which they live (i.e. patriarchal vs matriarchal societies).

Attempts to limit (or eliminate) mixed-race populations by legal means are reflected in anti-miscegenation laws, such as passed by various states in the United States.

== History ==
While customs, practices and systems of belief emphasizing the value of purity of descent are arguably as old as mankind, few societies systematically codified them, or legally enforced their outcome. Practices were enforced in communities. Such was the case in classical Greece – which made clear distinctions between Greeks and Barbarians. The Roman Republic had a different pattern. While it was expansionist, and militarily and culturally aggressive, it actively encouraged the Romanisation of client kingdoms, which included intermarriage of Romans with their elite citizens and making this class citizens of Rome as reward and as exemplars.

=== Hypo/hyperdescent in Colonial North America ===
The North American practice of applying a rule of hypodescent began during the colonial era when indentured servants and transported convicts working at the direction of European colonists and colonial authorities were joined by enslaved Africans who, from the 16th century onward, were transported to the Americas via the Atlantic slave trade. But while the freed captives were Christians, these individuals were classified as indentured workers.

Virginia formally enacted a slave code in 1705. There is documentary evidence from the 1650s that some Africans in Virginia were serving lifelong terms of indenture. In the 1660s, the Assembly stated that "any English servant that shall run away in company with any Negroes who are incapable of making satisfaction by addition of time shall serve for the time of the said Negroes absence", indicating that at least some Africans could not "make satisfaction" by serving longer if recaptured (presumably because they were already indentured for life). This device gave legal status to the practice of lifetime enslavement of people of African descent; in subsequent statutes the legislature defined conditions of lifetime servitude.

In 1655, Elizabeth Key Grinstead, a mixed-race woman, fought and won the first freedom suit in Virginia. Her English father had acknowledged her as his daughter, had her baptized as Christian, and, falling ill, established a legal guardian to care for her after his death, arranging a limited-term indenture for her as a girl. But the guardian sold her indenture and left the colony, and the next master did not free her. When he died, his estate claimed her and her son as slave property.

However, following Key's victory, Virginia established the principle in law in 1662 of partus sequitur ventrem, from Roman law; that is, children born in the colonies would take the social status of their mothers. This meant that all children born to enslaved women would be born into slavery, regardless of their paternity and race. This was in contrast to English common law, by which the status of children of English subjects was determined by the father.

As slavery became a racial caste system, people of only partial African ancestry and majority European ancestry were born into slavery. African descent became associated with slavery. By hypodescent, people of even partial African ancestry were classified socially below whites. By the late 18th century, there were numerous families of majority-white slaves, such as the mixed-race children born to the slave Sally Hemings and her master Thomas Jefferson. She was three-quarters white and the half-sister of his late wife; their children, born into slavery, were seven-eighths white. According to the Thomas Jefferson Foundation, "all four surviving children of Jefferson and Hemings were granted their freedom, either being allowed to leave Monticello with Jefferson’s knowledge and assistance, or through his will"; "when Beverly and Harriet Hemings passed into white society, they had to deny their family lineage".

The Southern author Mary Chesnut wrote in her famous A Diary from Dixie, of the Civil War-era, that "any lady is ready to tell you who is the father of all mulatto children in everybody’s household but her own. Those, she seems to think, drop from the clouds."

Fanny Kemble, the British actress who married an American slaveholder, wrote about her observations of slavery as well, including the way white men sexually abused slave women and left their mixed-race children enslaved.

Sometimes the white fathers freed the children and/or their mothers, or provided education or apprenticeship, or settled property on them in a significant transfer of social capital. Notable antebellum period examples of fathers who provided for their mixed-race children were the fathers of Charles Henry Langston and John Mercer Langston and the father of the Healy family of Georgia. Each had a common-law marriage with a woman of partial African descent. Other mixed-race children were left enslaved; some were sold away by their fathers.

Research by historians and genealogists has shown that unlike the above examples, most free African Americans listed in the first two US censuses in the Upper South were descended from relationships or marriages in colonial Virginia between white women, indentured servant or free, and African or African-American men, indentured servant, free or slave. Their unions reflected the fluid nature of relationships among the working classes before slave caste was hardened, as well as the small households and farms within which many people worked. The children of white mothers were born free. If they were illegitimate and mixed race, they were apprenticed in order to avoid the community being burdened with upkeep, but such people gained a step in freedom.

By the turn of the nineteenth century, many of these families of free African Americans, along with European-American neighbors, migrated to frontier areas of Virginia, North Carolina, and then further west. Such families sometimes settled in insular groups. Mixed-race people of African-European descent are believed to have been the origin of some isolated settlements, which have long claimed or were said to be of American Indian or Portuguese ancestry. As an example, a 21st-century DNA study of a group of Melungeon families in Tennessee and Kentucky, long rumored to be descendants of Turks or Native Americans, showed they were overwhelmingly of African and European ancestry.

=== Hypo/hyperdescent in Reconstruction, late 19th century and 20th-century United States ===
By the late 1870s, conservative white Democrats regained power in state legislatures across the South, even in areas where there were black majorities, largely by a process of violence and intimidation of black Republicans. The Democrats gradually imposed white supremacy in law and practice. From 1890 to 1908, beginning with Mississippi, the state legislatures passed new constitutions and laws that created barriers to voter registration by such means as the poll tax, literacy tests, record requirements and others. The number of voters on the rolls fell drastically and most blacks and many poor whites were disenfranchised for decades. The whites also passed Jim Crow laws, such as racial segregation of public facilities.

African Americans and whites established the National Association for the Advancement of Colored People in 1909 to fight against legal discrimination and disenfranchisement. Each time they won a court case, for instance, against the use of white primaries, white-dominated legislatures would pass new laws to exclude blacks from the political system.

In the 20th century, under influences of eugenics and racial discrimination, states enacted laws classifying people as black who had any traceable evidence (or perception of any African ancestry). Under Virginia's Racial Integrity Act of 1924, the 'One-drop' rule defined as black a person with any known African ancestry, regardless of the number of intervening generations.

The same Act established a binary classification system for vital records, classifying people as 'white' or 'black' (Negro at the time). The latter was effectively a 'catch all' term for all people of color. Native Americans were classified as colored, a clear indication of the then-prevalent local attitude to all races other than white.

In its most extreme form in the United States, hypodescent was the basis of the "one drop rule", meaning that if an individual had any black ancestry, the person was classified as black. Laws were passed in southern states and others in the early 20th century, long after the end of slavery to define white and black, under associated laws for segregation: Tennessee adopted such a "one-drop" statute in 1910; Louisiana; Texas; Arkansas in 1911; Mississippi in 1917; North Carolina in 1923; Virginia in 1924; Alabama and Georgia in 1927; and Oklahoma in 1931.

During this same period, Florida, Indiana, Kentucky, Maryland, Missouri, Nebraska, North Dakota, and Utah retained their old "blood fraction" statutes de jure, but amended these fractions (one-sixteenth, one-thirtysecond) to be equivalent to one-drop de facto.

By 1924 many "white" people in Virginia would have had some African and/or Native American ancestry, given the mixing over the centuries. At the same time that Virginia was trying to harden racial caste, African Americans were organizing to overturn segregation and regain civil rights, that had been lost to Jim Crow laws and disfranchisement of the majority of the black community.

== Anti-miscegenation marriage laws ==
By the early 1940s, of the thirty U.S. states that had anti-miscegenation laws, seven states (Alabama, Arizona, Georgia, Montana, Oklahoma, Texas, and Virginia) had adopted the one-drop theory for rules prohibiting interracial marriages. This was part of a continuing social hardening of racial lines after the turn of the century, when southern states imposed legal segregation and disfranchised African Americans.

Other states applied the hypodescent rule without carrying it to the "one-drop" extreme, using instead a blood quantum standard. For example, Utah's anti-miscegenation law prohibited marriage between a white and anyone considered a negro, mulatto, quadroon (one-fourth black), octoroon (one-eighth black), Mongolian, or member of "the Malay race" (here referring to Filipinos). No restrictions were placed on marriages between people who were not "white people". The law was repealed in 1963.

=== Other examples of application ===
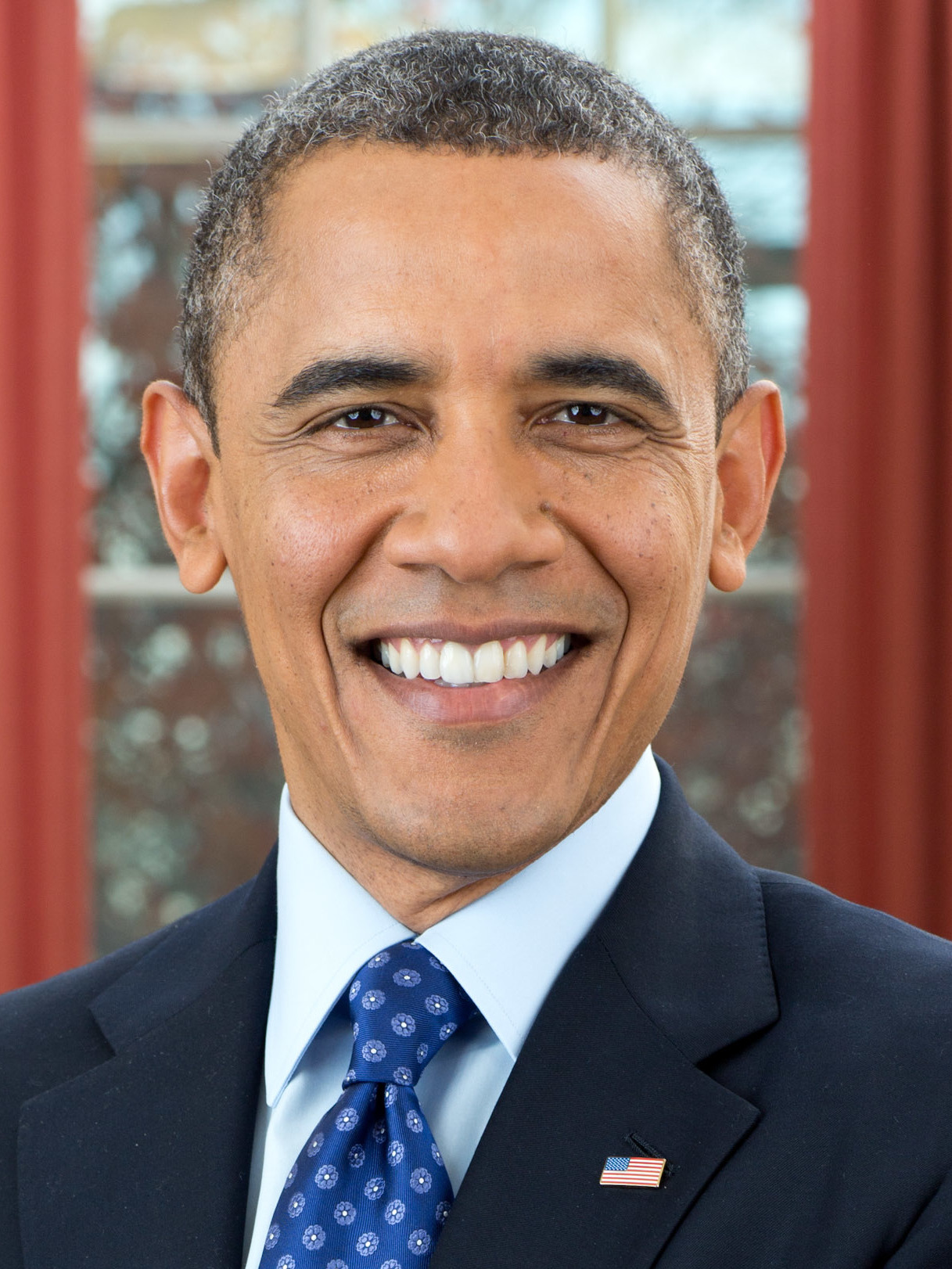
President Barack Obama, who self-identifies as black, was born to a father of black descent and a mother of mostly white descent.

In the United States, hypodescent has often defined children of mixed-race couples as black when one parent is classified as "black", or either is thought to have African descent.

Since the 1960s particularly and the rise of the Black Power movement, many members of the African-American community have emphasized that mixed-race individuals of African descent should identify as black in order to maximize their political power as a group in the United States. Leaders say they were historically discriminated against as black by white people, so should identify as black to assert their power in numbers.

President of the United States Barack Obama is often referred to as the first black or African-American President. He has said as a youth that he chose to identify as black and worked in community organizing in a black community. His mother and her parents were of European descent; his father and his family are sub-Saharan African from Kenya. But, in a case exemplifying the complex racial history of the United States, Obama is believed to be descended through his maternal line from John Punch, the first African documented historically as a slave in Virginia. The genealogical company Ancestry.com sponsored a study of his family history and documented this connection. Punch's descendants increasingly married white and are believed to have been accepted as white by the early 18th century.

In the history of the US, people have less consistently applied hypodescent in intermarriage between white people and people of other racial groups, such as Native Americans, and Asians. There was certainly discrimination against people of mixed European and Native American, and European and Asian ancestry, however.

Hypodescent is not only practiced by people of European ancestry. In Omaha, Nebraska, white people have celebrated Logan Fontenelle, a mixed-race man of the late 19th century who served as interpreter for a major treaty between the Omaha Nation and the United States that ceded most of their land before they moved to a reservation. White people referred to Fontenelle as chief of the Omaha, and he was one of the signatories of the treaty along with Omaha chiefs, perhaps because he spoke English. Various places in the city of Omaha were named after Fontenelle. But among the Omaha, Fontenelle was considered a white man because his father was white, and he was never a recognized chief. As the Omaha had a patrilineal kinship society, hereditary chieftainship and descent were passed through the male line. A person whose father was white was not considered Omaha unless he was formally adopted by a male Omaha member.

== References in culture ==
Both African-American and white authors have explored issues related to mixed race and hypodescent in fiction and non-fiction.

In the novel Pudd'nhead Wilson, by Mark Twain, the character of the enslaved woman Roxy is described as "Negro", although she has considerable white ancestry and could pass for white. Her son is born into slavery and is 1/32 part black. He is mistakenly switched in infancy with the white son of the master's household, and each grows up to fulfill his social role.

The US late-19th century author Charles Chesnutt, who grew up free in Ohio and was of mixed African-European ancestry, wrote numerous stories set in the post-Civil War South. He explored the issues encountered by people of mixed race, in some cases relating what became known as the tragic mulatto genre.

Passing is a 1929 novel by Nella Larsen, dealing with mixed-race African-American women who choose alternate paths for marriage and identity.

In the musical Show Boat (1927), a white man is married to a mixed-race woman passing for white. He is accused by the sheriff of violating the state's anti-miscegenation laws. The white man pricks his wife's finger with a knife, swallows a drop of blood, then tells the sheriff "I'm no white man – I've got negro blood in me." The sheriff lets him off.

Sinclair Lewis's novel Kingsblood Royal uses hypodescent and the "one drop" principle as principal plot elements.

Numerous memoirs have been published by African Americans who explore growing up as mixed race with a white parent, such as The Color of Water: A Black Man's Tribute to His White Mother by James McBride. Bliss Broyard, in One Drop: My Father's Hidden Life, wrote about her father Anatole Broyard's decision to live and work as a writer, rather than a black writer, largely separating from his mixed-race, Louisiana Creole family. He married a white woman of Swedish descent and their children appear white.

== See also ==
- Mestee – People of multiple races
- Mestizo – Spanish term to indicate mixed ancestry
- Racialism
- Racism
