= Cercle des Philadelphes =

18th-century learned society in Saint-Domingue

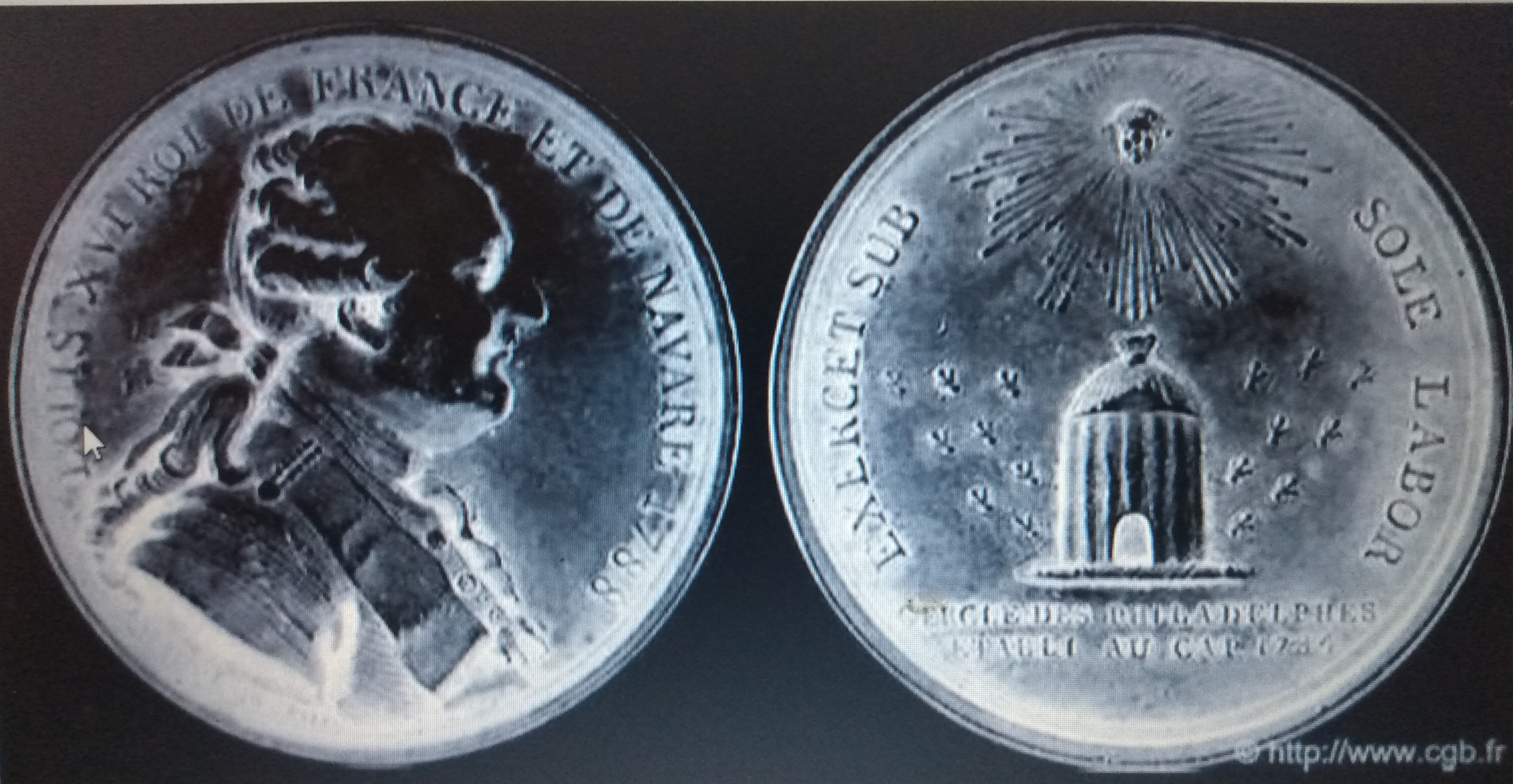
Cercle des Philadelphes (Saint-Domingue).

Cercle des Philadelphes was an academic scientific society in Saint-Domingue. It was founded in 1784 and ceased to function in 1791. It has been counted as the most prominent academic society in the Americas prior to the French Revolution.

One of its founding members was Médéric Louis Élie Moreau de Saint-Méry.

The society held its first official reunion on 15 August 1784. It developed most of its prominent ideas around mesmerism concepts, which were fought off by the French scientific institutions at the time. Its first stated goal was to develop the people's interest in arts and sciences. The Cercle's first partner was the Musée de Paris, and Benjamin Franklin was an early correspondent.

The Cercle minted its own attendance coins, which held its motto "Exercet sub sole labor". The society lived on a comfortable budget, but it remains unclear who financed most of it. It did not have a political mission, but its existence clashed with the supremacy of the King, even though the Cercle publicly claimed its allegiance to the King. Versailles became a significant donor to the Cercle des Philadelphes, and was recognized a fully-fledged "académie" by the Société des Sciences de Paris in 1789. The King requested that the Name of the Cercle be changed to Société Royale des Sciences et des Arts du Cap Français.

With the French revolution came the downfall of the Cercle. Many founders were traditionally rich white land owners who saw the social chaos in the métropole as a threat. The Cercle was opposed to giving political rights to people of color and to end slavery. When the news of the revolution reached Saint-Domingue in September 1789, it greatly impacted the social atmosphere of the island. Violent social movements led to crystallized political divisions, permanently weakening the influence of the Cercle, which seemed to have disappeared between 1791 and 1792.

Before closing the curtains on the Cercle des Philadelphes, Jean Arthaud, half-brother of Médéric Louis Élie Moreau de Saint-Méry and founder of the Cercle, wrote:

Trop empressés à recevoir les principes de la Révolution qui devaient nous être funestes, nous avons pris la coupe enivrante des nouveautés, sans voir que le poison qu'elle contenait devait nous déchirer les entrailles...

[In such a hurry to receive the principles of the Révolution which would lead to our end, we drank the intoxicating chalice of novelty, without noticing its poison that eventually shed our guts in tears...]

— Jean Arthaud
