= Reflected appraisal =

Reflected appraisal is a term used in psychology to describe a person's perception of how others see and evaluate them. The reflected appraisal process concludes that people come to think of themselves in the way they believe others think of them (Mead, 1934; Cooley, 1902; Sullivan, 1947). This process has been deemed important to the development of a person's self-esteem, especially because it includes interaction with people outside oneself, and is considered one of the main influences on the development of self-concept.

== History ==
Harry Stack Sullivan first coined the term reflected appraisal in 1953 when he published The Interpersonal Theory of Psychiatry, though Charles H. Cooley was the first to describe the process of reflected appraisal when he discussed his concept of the looking-glass self (1902). Although some of our self-views are gained by direct experience with our environment, most of what we know about ourselves is derived from others.

In 1979, Shrauger and Shoeneman found that rather than our self-concepts resembling the way others actually see us, our self-concepts are filtered through our perceptions and resemble how we think others see us. Felson (1985) understood that communication with other people reveals our understanding of our reflected appraisal. Felson (1993) went onto explain that individuals are not very accurate in judging what others think of them. Among the causes of the discrepancy is the apprehension of others about revealing their views. At best, they may reveal primarily favorable views rather than both favorable and unfavorable views. Consistent with other research (DePaulo, Kenny, Hoover, Webb & Oliver, 1987, Keny & Albright, 1987), Felson found that individuals have a better idea of how groups see them than of how specific individuals see them. Presumably, individuals learn the group standards and then apply those standards. In turn, when group members judge individuals, they use the same standards that individuals originally applied to themselves. Thus we find a correspondence in self-appraisals and other's appraisals of the self.

== Extent of impact ==
The extent to which reflected appraisals affect the person being appraised depends upon characteristics of the appraiser and his or her appraisal. Greater impact on the development of a person's self-concept is said to occur when: (1) the appraiser is perceived as a highly credible source (2) the appraiser takes a very personal interest in the person being appraised (3) the appraisal is very discrepant with the person's self-concept at the moment (4) the number of confirmations of a given appraisal is high (5) the appraisals coming from a variety of sources are consistent and (6) appraisals are supportive of the person's own beliefs about themself.

== Relationships ==
Several studies have been conducted on the way reflected appraisal affects various relationships in a person's life. The idea that a person's self-concept is related to what that person perceives as another's opinion usually holds more weight with significant others. Appraisals from significant others such as parents, close friends, trusted colleagues, and other people the individual strongly admires, influences self-concept development and often has more influence than a stranger on a child's developing self-esteem. Study of this topic has led to the realization that people sometimes tend to anticipate what will happen in the future based on a previous perception.

=== Families ===
Reflected appraisals are present among family members. All family members have opinions about one another and are typically less reticent to express them to each other than is the case outside of family relations. Siblings, especially, may be only too eager to give critical feedback regarding each other's behavior, appearance, social skills, and intelligence. Not all of these appraisals, of course, are equally significant for one's self-esteem. Both what is being appraised (with regard to its importance for one's self-concept) and who does the appraising, are important qualifiers. For children, on most things, the reflected appraisals of their parents may matter much more than those of their siblings.

Reflected appraisal has been the main process examined in studies of self-esteem within families. The bulk of this research has focused on the effects of parental behavior on children's self-esteem. In general, these studies find that parental support and encouragement, responsiveness, and use of inductive control are related positively to children's self-esteem (Gecas and Seff 1990). Most of these parental variables could be considered indicators of positive reflected appraisals of the child. They are also the parental behaviors found to be associated with the development of other positive socialization outcomes in children and adolescents (such as moral development, pro-social behavior, and academic achievement).

=== Married couples ===
In the investigation of the reflected appraisal process with newly married couples, social status derived from one's position in the social structure also influences the appraisal process. The spouse with the higher status (education, occupation, and income) in the marriage is more likely to not only influence their partner's self-views, but also their partner's views of them (Cast, Stets, & Burke, 1999). Spouses with a lower status in the marriage have less influence on the self-view of their higher status counterparts or on how their higher-status counterparts view them.

=== Work relationships ===
Reflected appraisals occur as we develop or identities at work, as well. Organizational scholars developed the reflected best-self (RBS) theory to help us understand our potential self-schemas (Quinn et al., 2003). When we have a challenge or jolt in an organizational setting, we can receive positive details about ourselves from colleagues that allow us to rise to our unseen potential. Scholars have also developed an exercise to compose a reflected best self that includes gathering information from others to build a portrait of you at your best that might be hidden from your own perception.

== Scripts ==
Through reflected appraisals, we are also given lines to speak in everyday situations (Murial & Joneward, 1971, pp. 68–100) that are sometimes so specific that some people refer to them as scripts. Through these scripts, we are given our lines, our gestures, and our characterizations. The scripts tell us how to act in future scenarios, and what is expected of us. Others tell us what they expect from us, how we should look, how we should behave, and how we should say our lines.

== Self-fulfilling prophecies ==
The messages we receive about ourselves during the process of reflected appraisal can become self-fulfilling prophecies. The Pygmalion effect, Rosenthal effect, and observer-expectancy effect show that biased expectancies could affect reality and create self-fulfilling prophecies through reflected appraisal. If you were given positive reflected appraisals when you were young, you probably have a good self-concept; if the appraisals were largely negative, your self-concept may suffer.
