= Anglo-Saxon Clubs of America =

American political organization

The Anglo Saxon Clubs of America (A.S.C.O.A.) was a white supremacist political organization which was active in the United States in the 1920s and lobbied in favor of anti-miscegenation laws and against immigration from outside of Northern Europe. Founded in Richmond, Virginia, in 1922 by musician and composer John Powell and political activist Earnest Sevier Cox, the organization had 400 members in 1923 and 32 "posts" by 1925 and was open only to white male members. The organization was successful in lobbying for tougher legislation and is credited with having secured the passing of the Racial Integrity Act of 1924. The organization has been described as "an elitist version of the Ku Klux Klan".

== Organizational structure and goals ==
The Anglo-Saxon Clubs of America was founded in Richmond, Virginia, in 1922 by Walter Plecker, Earnest Sevier Cox, and John Powell. Plecker and Cox supported the A.S.C.O.A. and pushed for its growth as a political organization, and Powell organized the group in an official capacity, while Cox and Plecker focused on the scientific and applicative aspects of A.S.C.O.A., respectively. Powell expanded the influence of A.S.C.O.A. by going to colleges and giving lectures on the dangers of interracial relations. Such talks sometimes culminated in A.S.C.O.A. branches being established at those colleges, including at the College of William & Mary and the University of Virginia. Cox wrote multiple books regarding the importance of full separation between the two races, and used arguments such as the loss of intellectual capability to push for a clear legal distinction. In his novel "Let My People Go," he repeatedly addressed the Black man, arguing that a true separation of race would benefit everyone and allow all races to develop independently. As a result of the aforementioned methods, A.S.C.O.A. eventually gained notoriety. It was especially known within the elite class, who viewed it as an alternative to the more brash Ku Klux Klan.

The club's main goal was to amend the classification of the "White" race to exclude any percentage of African blood, no matter how small. In reference to the 1910 Virginia Act that reclassified the "Colored" race, A.S.C.O.A. argued that the measure of 1/16th Black ancestry was not enough to fully determine where the "Colored" population ended and the "White" population began. Instead, its members stated that an absolute line was necessary to prevent any more mingling of the races, which would therefore stop the collapse of the “White” race. A.S.C.O.A. backed these arguments with census data, which were often provided by W. A. Plecker. The group also borrowed popular ideas from known eugenicists at the time, including Madison Grant and Lothrop Stoddard. By presenting themselves as purveyors of scientific knowledge, rather than a group of angry dissenters, A.S.C.O.A. was able to gain more support from the government and the general public. The concept of a "Color Line," which was repeatedly brought up by Powell and Cox in multiple texts, represents their ideas of race: they believed that the current "Color Line" had failed in its goal to separate the races, and wanted to construct a firmer boundary that would enclose the White race from the encroaching, in their opinion, Black race. Ostensibly, A.S.C.O.A. was opposed to racism and engaged in "fair play," which helped its reputation as a rational, logic-oriented organization. The efforts of Powell, Cox, and Plecker eventually resulted in a petition to amend Virginia's laws regarding mixed marriages, along with a new classification for "White." The petition, which also included a more strict registration system for immigrants, received over 200,000 signatures, and was the basis for the Racial Integrity Act of 1924. During this time, A.S.C.O.A. grew to have over 20 posts in Virginia alone. By 1925, the group had 31 posts.

== Racial Integrity Act of 1924 ==
In February 1924, the Virginia House of Delegates convened to discuss the bill proposed by A.S.C.O.A. The bill, introduced as House Bill No. 311 on February 15, defined a White person as any person with "no trace whatsoever of any blood other than caucasian." The bill was passed by both the Senate and the House, and was signed into law on March 20. The law was a direct result of A.S.C.O.A.'s successful petition. The Racial Integrity Act is an example of the growing institutionalized racism of the time, which can be seen in other such instances as the use of ethnic composition in guidelines for housing loans. The law remained in place until 1967, when it was overturned in the Loving v. Virginia case.

Cox viewed the Racial Integrity Act as "the most perfect expression of the white ideal, and the most important eugenical effort that has been made in 4,000 years." There was a controversial court case, however, where a woman named Atha Sorrels successfully argued that her racial background was Native, not Black; she was able to get married and bypass the Racial Integrity Act, undermining the work that Powell, Cox, and Plecker had done and realizing their fears of intermarriage. For 43 years, A.S.C.O.A.’s work was an integral part of Virginian law. During this time, the trend of pseudoscience began to shift, as professional scientists rescinded their support for racial “science.”

== Fate ==
Beginning in the 1920s, the scientific community delved more deeply into the inner workings of race, and found that ethnic science was not based in fact. Critiques of A.S.C.O.A.’s scientific reasoning began to grow, and its members were not able to readily maintain their image as rational professionals. The club, struggling financially and with no real motive other than the eventual separation of races, lost the steam that had propelled it from its creation. Powell continued to have musical concerts, and when he passed in 1963, was lauded as a great composer in his obituary. Cox died in 1966 with no heirs or wife, and is remembered for his work in eugenics. Plecker died in 1947 after being struck by a car, and left behind no children. His work and racial policies have harmed generations of Virginians, especially indigenous groups, who now face the added challenge of proving unbroken lineage, which is required for federal recognition. A.S.C.O.A. was not a singular movement, and represents a time in American history where racism was codified into law; not just because of the persistence of pseudoscientists, but because of the support from both the public and the government.

== See also ==
- Afrikaner Broederbond
- Knights of the White Camelia
