= Earnest Sevier Cox =

American preacher and white supremacist (1880–1966)

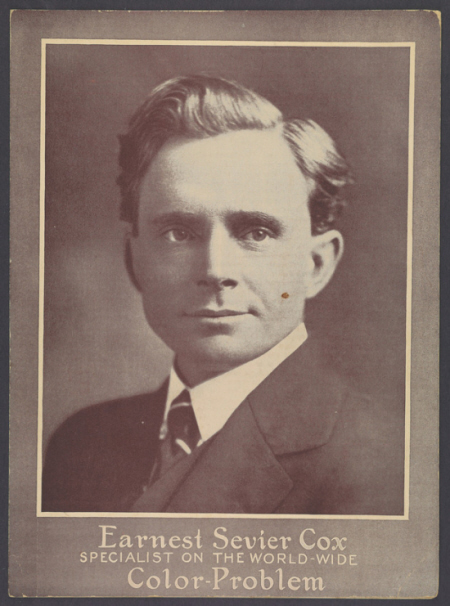
- Self-published promotional photo of Cox from 1930
- Born: January 24, 1880; Blount County, Tennessee, US
- Died: April 26, 1966 (aged 86); Richmond, Virginia, US
- Resting place: Arlington National Cemetery
- Education: Roane College; Moody Bible Institute; Vanderbilt University; University of Chicago
- Occupation: Author

Earnest Sevier Cox (January 24, 1880 – April 26, 1966), was an American Methodist preacher, political activist and white supremacist. He is best known for his political campaigning for stricter segregation between blacks and whites in the United States through tougher anti-miscegenation laws, for his advocacy for "repatriation" of African Americans to Africa, and for his book White America. He is also noted for having mediated collaboration between white southern segregationists and African-American separatist organizations such as UNIA and the Peace Movement of Ethiopia to advocate for repatriation legislation, and for having been a personal friend of black racial separatist Marcus Garvey.

== Biography ==
=== Early life ===
Earnest Sevier Cox was born on January 24, 1880, in Blount County, Tennessee, near Knoxville. He received a Bachelor of Science degree from Roane College in Tennessee in 1899. He then studied to become a Methodist preacher at the Moody Bible Institute in Chicago. He studied theology at Vanderbilt University in Nashville, Tennessee, until 1909, but clashed with the faculty and did not receive a degree.

During his studies he worked as a street preacher but had to give up preaching due to throat problems. He then spent three years studying sociology in graduate school at the University of Chicago but did not receive a degree. During that time, he studied under Professors Frederick Starr and Edward Alsworth Ross. During his studies in Chicago he became a vocal proponent of white supremacy and black inferiority, and of the view that blacks and whites could never peacefully coexist. He began traveling to give public lectures.

=== Career ===
==== Travels and war efforts ====
Encouraged by Starr, upon leaving the University of Chicago, Cox traveled to Africa, where he spent five years. He described his trip as an effort of "finding out how other people control their negroes". He worked in the diamond mines in South Africa and later traveled north through Rhodesia, Belgian Congo and German East Africa, north to Egypt. In his writings he extolled the German colonies he considered to have high "racial patriotism".

After returning for a year to South African mines he traveled through South America from Peru and Brazil to Panama. Upon his return to Tennessee he presented himself in his lectures and publications as an explorer, ethnographer and expert on race relations. He became the subject of a piece in The New York Times describing his travels to study the "Negro Problem" in Africa.

He also continued giving public lectures and preparing a manuscript for publication. During World War I, he served as a captain in the United States Army but received an honorable discharge when he was found unfit to serve at the front lines. In 1920 he settled in Richmond, where he sold real estate.

==== Meeting with Grant and anti-miscegenation lobbyism ====
In 1920 he sent a copy of his manuscript on race relations to prominent eugenicist and nordicist Madison Grant, whose 1916 work The Passing of the Great Race had become an instant classic among scientific racists. He complained to Grant that he could not find a publisher for his work, and Grant supported him by providing basic education in racial anthropological theory and providing sounder arguments and toning down the emotional tone of the book. Grant also wrote a glowing review of the book, which mentioned him prominently in the acknowledgements. Cox thanked Grant by acting as a political organizer on Grant's behalf, a role that Grant was unable to personally undertake since public political involvement was incompatible with his reputation as a prominent New York patrician.

In 1922, with composer John Powell, Cox co-founded the Anglo-Saxon Clubs of America, based on Madison Grant's nordicist ideology, in Richmond, Virginia. The group lobbied in favor of anti-miscegenation laws. Grant also requested Cox to act as a campaigner in favor of Virginia's Racial Integrity Act of 1924, the version favored by Cox and Grant would have meant that any documented non-white ancestry would be enough to classify an individual as non-white. The final version passed was more lenient, in that it allowed for classification as "white" even for people with a small amount of Native American blood.

In 1943 when anthropologists Ruth Benedict and Gene Weltfish published their pamphlet "The Races of Mankind" in which they argued that there was no scientific basis for claims of racial superiority or inferiority, Cox wrote a scathing 22-page review, in which he decried the authors as participants in a Jewish and communist conspiracy in favor of "atavistic" and "perverted" miscegenation.

==== Publication of White America ====
"Scientific research has done much toward establishing the following propositions:
1. The White race has founded all civilizations.
2. The White race remaining White has not lost civilization.
3. The White race become hybrid has not retained civilization."

— Earnest Sevier Cox, White America

In 1923, unable to find a publisher, Cox published the book White America himself. The book argued that race mixing would result in the downfall of "White civilization" and proposed the removal of all people of African descent from the American continent. It was later reissued, funded by Wickliffe Draper. In this book which has been described as a "crude retelling" of Madison Grant's Passing of the Great Race, he argued that race science had produced three different findings: 1. that only the white race had ever achieved civilization, 2. that the white race while unmixed with other races had never lost civilization, and 3. that the white race when mixed with other races has never retained civilization. The main chapters of the book were examples of historical civilizations that had disappeared or declined, which Cox interpreted as being the result of contact with "Colored races". The last chapters analyzed the "race problem" in the US, and provided a proposal for a solution, namely, to deport all black people "of breeding Age" to Africa.

The book won positive attention from several important academics and intellectuals in the period, and Cox was invited to Harvard to speak about it by Harry Laughlin the prominent eugenicist. Laughlin's journal "the Eugenical News" stated that "the removal of Negroes would make Cox a greater savior of his country than George Washington". The book was also incorporated into the biology curriculum at the University of Virginia. It was less well received by anthropologists, and Melville Herskovits reviewed it in the journal Social Forces and described it as "fallacious in its assumptions, incompetent in its handling and loose in its logic".

==== Repatriation activism and friendship with Marcus Garvey ====
In 1924, Grant suggested that Cox attend a lecture of Jamaican American racial activist Marcus Garvey, whose organization, the Universal Negro Improvement Association and African Communities League (UNIA), shared Grant and Cox' passion for racial purity and considered repatriation of African Americans to the African continent to be the only way to salvation of their respective races. In 1924 Cox attended as the only white man, a lecture by Garvey, and after that the two began collaborating, working jointly lobbying legislative measures that would promote the migration of American Blacks to Africa.

Despite their divergent backgrounds, the relationship between Garvey and Cox developed into a genuine friendship. In one of his books, Garvey presented a full-page ad for Cox' book White America, without charge. Garvey also endorsed the book as providing the solution to the "negro Problem", namely the "separation of the races". UNIA also promoted and sold Cox' book, distributing 17,000 copies in Detroit in the 1920s. When Garvey was imprisoned, Cox and Powell campaigned for his release, Cox even pleading with the Secretary of Labor.

The collaboration between Cox and Garvey ended in 1927 when Garvey was deported to Jamaica, although the friendship between the two persisted. Late in his life Garvey praised Cox and Bilbo, stating that "These two white men have done wonderfully well for the Negro and should not be forgotten." Cox in turn dedicated his 1925 book Let My People Go to Garvey and referred to their relation as a "spiritual understanding".

Cox continued to collaborate with UNIA and later with the Peace Movement of Ethiopia. In 1936 Cox visited Grant who was by then confined to bed by illness, but who nonetheless agreed to create a $10,000 endowment to fund lobby activities in congress for repatriation and deportation legislation. Grant did not live to make good on his promise, but his friend Wickliffe Draper did it for him and also funded additional printings of Cox' book.

==== Continued repatriation efforts ====
When Senator Theodore Bilbo of Mississippi was campaigning for the Greater Liberia Bill of 1939, which asked the United States federal government to provide federal funding for sending African Americans to Liberia, Cox helped him in securing the support of the remaining Garveyites and the Peace Movement of Ethiopia. Cox even had a role in inspiring Bilbo to take on the project, as he had sent him a copy of his book which Bilbo read with pleasure, requesting from Cox copies of his newer writings. Cox also served as an important adviser to Bilbo, cautioning him to tone down his otherwise often inflammatory speech style and to address his Black allies with some degree of respect.

The bill failed however, partly due to the outbreak of World War II, which re-focused the attention of national legislation and rendered it impossible to count on the participation of Britain and France in the repatriation efforts. In 1953 when North Dakota senator William Langer proposed a similar repatriation bill, Cox again worked for him as a tireless promoter and publicist, and even spoke in favor of the bill at a hearing in the Senate Foreign Relations Committee.

==== Anti-Civil rights advocacy and Nazi contacts ====
During the 1950s and 1960s, Cox lobbied against the ending of racial segregation in the United States.

In 1951, he self-published the book Teutonic Unity. In the book, Cox criticized the two World Wars as futile "fratricides". The former Methodist had lost his faith, and so also distanced himself from Christianity which he now considered a "Judaic" religion, alien to the Teutonic genius. He distributed personally to people that he deemed fellow supporters of the "Teutonic cause". Among the recipients was Dr. Johann von Leers, a Nazi fugitive living in Argentina. In his letter to Cox thanking him for the book he described his surprise that an American writer would be advocating the same tenets that he had been taught in the Waffen SS and offered to translate the work into German.

In response to the U.S. Supreme Court decision Brown v. Board of Education and the ensuing de-segregation of the American public school system, Cox published Unending Hate, in which he argued that the Bill of Rights was in essence a tribal document, only meant to extend rights to those of "Saxon stock", not to members of other races, and that in forcing Southern Whites to mingle with Blacks in the school system, the bill of rights was being prostituted.

As the most prominent surviving nordicist of the generation of the 1920s, Cox became a respected figure on the racialist far-right of the 1950s and '60s. He collaborated extensively with white supremacists Willis Carto and Carleton Putnam. Carto's Noontide Press published reprints of several of Cox's early writings. Cox was also a member of the British-based Northern League founded by Roger Pearson, and he was invited to speak at their 1959 conference in the Teutoburg Forest. In his address titled "Herman's brother", Cox described Americans as descendants of the brother of the German cultural hero Arminius (Herman), who defeated the Romans at the Battle of Teutoburg Forest, and hence as "racial brothers" of the German people. In 1960 he wrote a letter to George Lincoln Rockwell the founder of the Virginia-based American Nazi Party sending them the address he gave in the Teutoburger forest meeting, and stating that he was in "fundamental sympathy" with most of their ideas.

=== Death ===
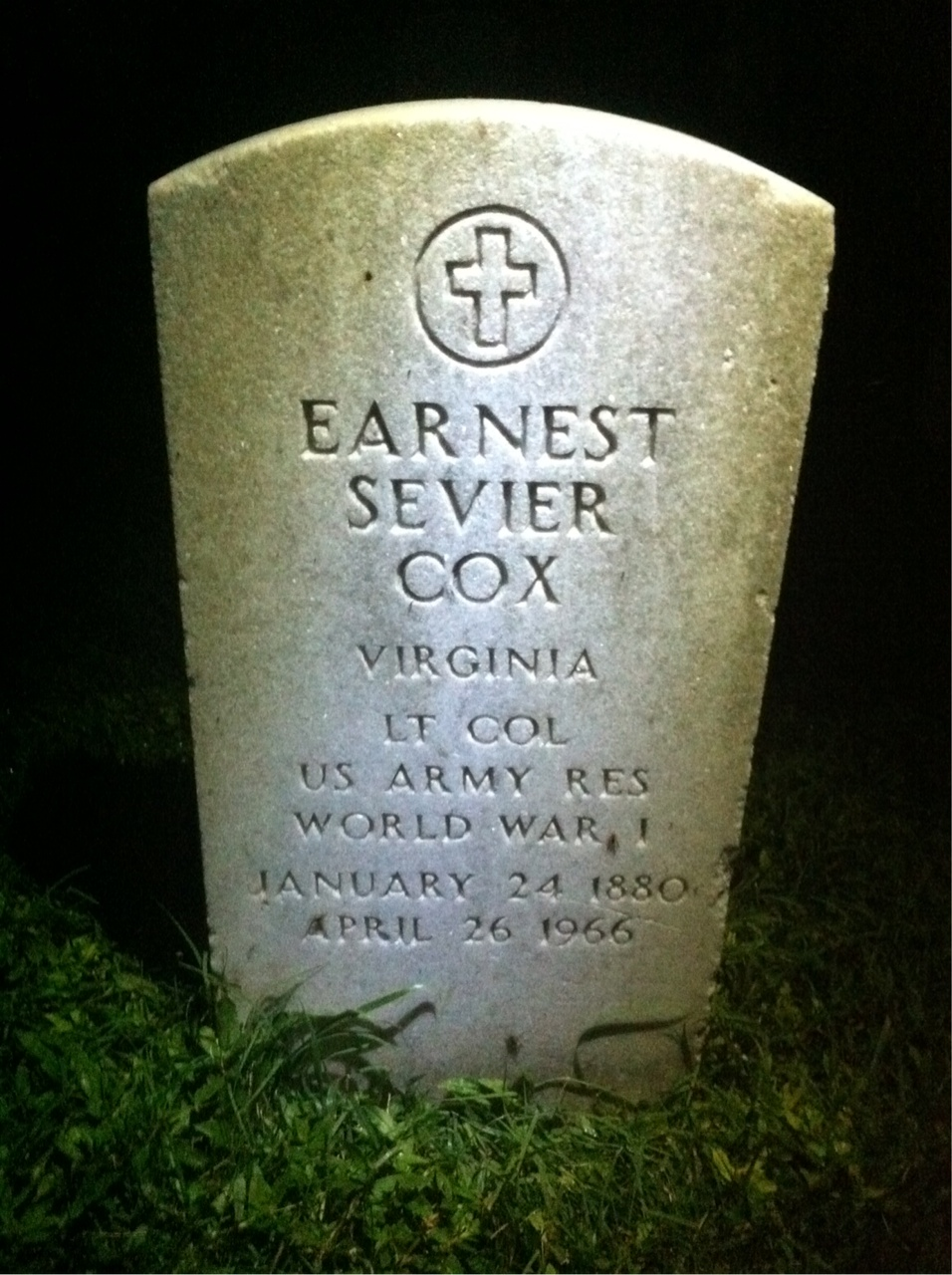
Grave of Earnest Sevier Cox at Arlington National Cemetery

Cox died of emphysema on April 26, 1966, in Richmond, Virginia. With no heirs, he left all of his possessions to the repatriation movement. He was buried at the Arlington National Cemetery. His collected papers are hosted at the archive of Duke University.

== Bibliography ==
- White America (1923)
- Let My People Go (1925)
- The South's Part in Mongrelizing the Nation (1926)
- Lincoln's Negro Policy (1938)
- Three Million Negroes Thank the State of Virginia (1940)
- Teutonic Unity (1951)
- Unending Hate (1955)
- Black Belt Around the World at the High Noon of Colonialism (1963)
