= Sacatra =

Person who was the descendant of one black and one griffe parent

Sacatra was a term used in the French Colony of Saint-Domingue to describe the descendant of one black and one griffe parent, a person whose ancestry is 7/8 black and 1/8 white. It was one of the many terms used in the colony's racial caste system to measure one's black blood.

The etymology of sacatra is uncertain; Félix Rodríguez González linked it to Spanish sacar 'take out' and atrás 'behind'; thus, a sacatra is a slave who is not kept in the house or at the front as a lighter-skinned servant might be.

== In fiction ==
- In the 1989 novel The Dancing Other, French author Suzanne Dracius mentions her main character finding "true friendship with a cheery sacatra girl with soft, caramel skin."
- Nalo Hopkinson's 2004 speculative fiction novel The Salt Roads begins with Georgine, an enslaved girl who gets pregnant by a white man, denying that her child is going to be "just mulatto. I’m griffonne, my mother was sacatra. The baby will be marabou."

== See also ==
- Mulatto Haitians
- Quadroon
- Octoroon
- Affranchi
- Gens de couleur
- Afro-Haitians
- Marabou
