= Black–white binary =

Racial paradigm in critical race theory

In critical race theory, the black–white binary is a paradigm through which racial history is presented as a linear story between White and Black Americans. This binary has largely defined how civil rights legislation is approached in the United States, as African Americans led most of the major racial justice movements that informed civil rights era reformation. The paradigm conceptualizes Black and White people as the two predominant racial groups, viewing all racism accordant to anti-blackness, and the Black–White relation as central to racial analysis. According to critical race scholars, the binary acts to govern racial classifications and describe how race is understood and approached politically and socially throughout American history. The black-white binary is a product of white socialization and reduces race relations to an oppressor/oppressed dichotomy.

While the black–white binary defines how racism has been widely approached in the United States, many scholars of color have scrutinized the concept for contributing to the marginalization of non-Black people of color, and omitting them from American civil rights history. Richard Delgado and Jean Stefancic propose a criticism of the black–white binary in an introductory book on critical race theory, arguing that because anti-discrimination law is designed with African American civil rights in mind, it fails to address the forms of discrimination that non-Black people of color experience.

Non-Black and non-White racial groups, such as Asian Americans and Native Americans, are understood as being positioned in relation to blackness and whiteness. The measurement of non-Black, non-White racial groups through this binary led to the concept of white adjacency, which refers to racial groups considered adjacent to whiteness. The application of white adjacency to Asian Americans through the model minority myth further marginalizes Asian Americans under the black–white binary, measuring them by their perceived proximity to whiteness, and their subsequent positional opposition to blackness.

Queerness is racialized as normatively white through the black-white binary, further marginalizing queer people of color.

To address the issues that stem from the black-white binary, it is believed to be important for a "coalition of forces" to work towards racial justice.

== See also ==
- Racial Integrity Act of 1924 - an example of a legally codified white-colored binary
