= Racial Integrity Act of 1924 =

Virginia anti-miscegenation law

Racial Integrity Act of 1924

In 1924, the Virginia General Assembly enacted the Racial Integrity Act, which reinforced racial segregation by prohibiting interracial marriage and classifying as "White" a person "who has no trace whatsoever of any blood other than Caucasian". The act, an outgrowth of the eugenicist and scientific racist ideology widespread in the United States, was pushed by Walter Plecker, a staunch advocate of White supremacist policies and eugenics who held the post of registrar of the Virginia Bureau of Vital Statistics.

The Racial Integrity Act required that all birth certificates and marriage certificates in Virginia to include the person's race as either "white" or "colored". The Act classified all non-whites, including Native Americans, as "colored". The act was part of a series of "racial integrity laws" enacted in Virginia to reinforce racial hierarchies and prohibit the mixing of races; other statutes included the Public Assemblages Act of 1926 (which required the racial segregation of all public meeting areas) and a 1930 act that defined any person with even a trace of sub-Saharan African ancestry as black (thus codifying the so-called "one-drop rule").

In 1967, parts of the Act were overturned by the United States Supreme Court in its ruling in Loving v. Virginia. The Virginia General Assembly repealed the remainder of the Act in 1975 and the unenforcable parts of the Act in 2020. The General Assembly passed a resolution that condemned the Act for its "use as a respectable, 'scientific' veneer to cover the activities of those who held blatantly racist views" in 2001. A year later, Virginia Governor Mark Warner issued a statement that expressed regret for the act.

== Historical background (1676–1924) ==
The history of anti-miscegenation laws in the United States far predates Virginia's Racial Integrity Act. By 1924, 29 other states had also passed anti-miscegenation laws. These laws outlined racial categories of "white" and "colored", with the latter indicating those with Black, Indigenous, or otherwise non-European ancestry.

The colony of Virginia enacted its first law banning all marriage between "white" and "colored" people in 1691.

=== 18th- and 19th-century racialization and detribalization ===
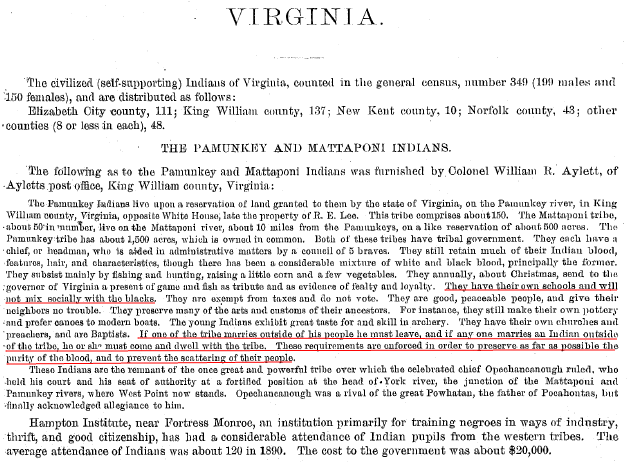
1890 US census report on Virginia Indians

In his writings from the 18th century, Thomas Jefferson expressed highly racist views on Black people, arguing against the admixture of the Black and White races. Although Jefferson did not believe Indigenous blood was genetically inferior in the same way, he contended that Black and Indigenous intermarriage depleted the indigeneity of Virginia's tribes. Jefferson's theories laid the foundation for both the eugenics movement and the 20th-century arguments that Virginia's first peoples were not "real Indians" because they lacked so-called racial purity.

Although Black and Indigenous populations have intermarried since colonial inception, these relationships grew increasingly risky to Virginia's Native groups. Whites pointed to the admixture of Blackness in Native communities as a way of delegitimizing their ethnic authenticity and land rights. Beginning in 1784, the Virginia General Assembly received several petitions demanding the dissolution of the nearly seven-hundred acre reservation belonging to the Gingaskin Tribe of Virginia's eastern shore. Their justification centered on the claim that only six real Indians remained on the reservation, with the land being used in reality as "an asylum for free negroes and other disorderly persons". In 1812, the petition went through. The Gingaskin Tribe was declared no longer Indian and instead classified as "free Negroes", dispossessing them of all of their reservation land. In the eyes of the General Assembly and White Virginians, the presence of Black blood negated any Indigenous identity, thereby removing their right to tribal lands and placing it in the hands of Whites.

=== Walter Plecker and the eugenics movement ===
In the 1920s, Virginia's registrar of statistics, Walter Ashby Plecker, was allied with the newly founded Anglo-Saxon Clubs of America in persuading the Virginia General Assembly to pass the Racial Integrity Law of 1924. The club was founded in Virginia by John Powell of Richmond in the fall of 1922; within a year the club for white males had more than 400 members and 31 posts in the state.

In 1923, the Anglo-Saxon Club founded two posts in Charlottesville, one for the town and one for students at the University of Virginia. A major goal was to end "amalgamation" by interracial marriage. Members also claimed to support Anglo-Saxon ideas of fair play. Later that fall, a state convention of club members was to be held in Richmond.

The Virginia assembly's 21st-century explanation for the laws summarizes their development:

The now-discredited pseudoscience of eugenics was based on theories first propounded in England by Francis Galton, the cousin and disciple of famed biologist Charles Darwin. The goal of the "science" of eugenics was to improve the human race by eliminating what the movement's supporters considered hereditary disorders or flaws through selective breeding and social engineering. The eugenics movement proved popular in the United States, with Indiana enacting the nation's first eugenics-based sterilization law in 1907.

The Racial Integrity Act proclaimed to preserve the purity of Whiteness by keeping so-called "colored blood" out of the "White" gene pool. Given that the three major proponents of the Racial Integrity Act—Walter Plecker, John Powell, and Earnest Cox—were spurred on by non-reservation groups (including the Chickahominy and Rappahannock) organizing to assert their identities, it can be noted that racialization became a tool for dispossession.

== Implementation and consequences (1924–1979) ==
Journalist Warren Fiske wrote that the combined effect of these laws adversely affected the continuity of Virginia's American Indian tribes. The Racial Integrity Act called for only two racial categories to be recorded on birth certificates, rather than the traditional six: "white" and "colored" (which now included Indian and all discernible mixed-race persons). In 1930, the US census for Virginia recorded 779 Indians; by 1940, that number had been reduced to 198.

Plecker said that he enforced the Racial Integrity Act extending far beyond his jurisdiction in the segregated society. He pressured school superintendents to exclude mixed-race (then called mulatto) children from white schools. Plecker ordered the exhumation of dead people of "questionable ancestry" from white cemeteries to be reinterred elsewhere.

=== Indians reclassified as colored ===
As registrar, Plecker directed the reclassification of nearly all Virginia Indians as colored on their birth and marriage certificates. Consequently, two or three generations of Virginia Indians had their ethnic identity altered on these public documents. Fiske reported that Plecker's tampering with the vital records of the Virginia Indian tribes made it impossible for descendants of six of the eight tribes recognized by the state to gain federal recognition, because they could no longer prove their American Indian ancestry by documented historical continuity. The RIA prohibited midwives as labeling anyone as Indian on their birth certificate, and prevented anyone from marrying as an Indian on their marriage license. Thus, those classified as White people could only marry other "White people, and those classified as colored, including Indigenous Virginians, could only marry within that identification.

=== The Pocahontas exception ===
The Racial Integrity Act was subject to the Pocahontas Clause (or Pocahontas Exception), which allowed people with claims of no more than 1/16 American Indian ancestry to still be considered white, despite the otherwise unyielding climate of one-drop rule politics. The exception regarding the American Indian blood quantum was included as an amendment to the original Act in response to concerns of Virginia elites, including many of the First Families of Virginia, who had always claimed descent from Pocahontas with pride, but now worried that the new legislation would jeopardize their status. The exception stated:

It shall thereafter be unlawful for any white person in this State to marry any save a white person, or a person with no other admixture of blood than white and American Indian. For the purpose of this act, the term "white person" shall apply only to the person who has no trace whatsoever of any blood other than Caucasian; but persons who have one-sixteenth or less of the blood of the American Indian and have no other non-Caucasic blood shall be deemed to be white persons.

While definitions of "Indian", "colored", and variations of these were established and altered throughout the 18th and 19th centuries, this was the first direct case of whiteness itself being defined officially in Virginia.

=== Enforcement ===
Once these laws were passed, Plecker was in the position to enforce them. Governor E. Lee Trinkle, a year after signing the act, asked Plecker to ease up on the Indians and not "embarrass them any more than possible". Plecker responded, "I am unable to see how it is working any injustice upon them or humiliation for our office to take a firm stand against their intermarriage with white people, or to the preliminary steps of recognition as Indians with permission to attend white schools and to ride in white coaches."

Unsatisfied with the "Pocahontas Exception", eugenicists introduced an amendment to narrow loopholes to the Racial Integrity Act. This was considered by the Virginia General Assembly in February 1926, but it failed to pass. If adopted, the amendment would have reclassified thousands of "white" people as "colored" by more strictly implementing the "one-drop rule" of ancestry as applied to American Indian ancestry.

Plecker reacted strongly to the Pocahontas Clause with fierce concerns of the white race being "swallowed up by the quagmire of mongrelization", particularly after marriage cases like that of the Johns and Sorrels, in which the women of these couples argued that the family members listed as "colored" had actually been Native American because of historically unclear categorizing.

==== Involuntary sterilization ====
There are records of the number of people who were involuntarily sterilized during the years these two laws were in effect. Of the involuntary sterilizations reported in the United States prior to 1957, Virginia was second, having sterilized a total of 6,683 persons (California was first, having sterilized 19,985 people without their consent). Many more women than men were sterilized: 4,043 to 2,640. Of those, 2,095 women were sterilized under the category of "Mentally Ill"; and 1,875 under the category "Mentally Deficient". The remainder were for "Other" reasons.

==== Motivations ====
In 1935, a decade after the passage of Virginia's eugenics laws, Plecker wrote to Walter Gross, director of Nazi Germany's Bureau of Human Betterment and Eugenics. Plecker described Virginia's racial purity laws and requested to be put on Gross' mailing list. Plecker commented upon the Third Reich's sterilization of 600 children in the Rhineland (the so-called Rhineland Bastards, who were born of German women by black French colonial fathers): "I hope this work is complete and not one has been missed. I sometimes regret that we have not the authority to put some measures in practice in Virginia."

=== Responses to the Racial Integrity Act ===
In the early 20th century, persons of color in everyday southern society feared to voice their opinions due to severe oppression. Magazines such as the Richmond Planet offered the black community a voice and the opportunity to have their concerns heard. The Richmond Planet made a difference in society by openly expressing the opinions of persons of color in society. After the passing of the Racial Integrity Act of 1924 the Richmond Planet published the article "Race Amalgamation Bill Being Passed in Va. Legislature. Much Discussion Here on race Integrity and Mongrelization ... Bill Would Prohibit Marriage of Whites and Non-whites ..."Skull of Bones" Discusses race question." The journalist opened the article with Racial Integrity Act and gave a brief synopsis of the act. Then followed statements from the creators of the Racial Integrity Act, John Powell and Earnest S. Cox. Mr. Powell believed that the Racial Integrity Act was needed as "maintenance of the integrity of the white race to preserve its superior blood" and Cox believed in what he called "the great man concept" which means that if the races were to intersect that it would lower the rate of great white men in the world. He defended his position by saying that non-whites would agree with his ideology:

The sane and educated Negro does not want social equality ... They do not want intermarriage or social mingling any more than does the average American white man wants it. They have race pride as well as we. They want racial purity as much as we want it. There are both sides to the question and to form an unbiased opinion either way requires a thorough study of the matter on both sides.

Indigenous responses to the Racial Integrity Act were persistent and varied. Virginia’s Tidewater Native communities did not want to be lumped into the category of “colored” that subjected Black Americans to the disenfranchisement of Jim Crow laws. Some of these involve establishing Indigenous-only schools as a method of cultural preservation, creating alliances with the Baptist Church which supported their racial identity as separate from Black Americans, and working with White ethnographers to prove their lineage.

At the same time, Indigenous refusal to be lumped into the Black side of a racial binary came at a cost to Black-Indigenous relationships. As Plecker contended that tribe members were not "real Indians" because of the presence of Black ancestry in their communities, many groups chose to distance themselves from Blackness by kicking out members with traits phenotypically identifiable as Black and even establishing anti-miscegenation laws of their own. Jack D. Forbes writes:

Those who had more than one-thirty-second African blood could not remain on the reservation as "Indians," even though they might have lived there all of their lives…We can speculate that families were permanently split...

The pushback against the effects of the Racial Integrity Act tore families apart, with Afro-Indigenous people whose ancestors had lived on the reservation for generations being completely ostracized from the community. In an attempt to evade Jim Crow racism, many Indigenous groups perpetuated it themselves.

== Lasting impacts (1967-2020) ==
=== Supreme Court overturn, legislative repeal process and apology ===
On June 12, 1967, the US Supreme Court ruled in Loving v. Virginia that the portion of the Racial Integrity Act that criminalized marriages between "whites" and "nonwhites" was found to be contrary to the guarantees of equal protection of citizens under the Fourteenth Amendment to the United States Constitution, thus overturning that part of the act. In 1975, the Assembly repealed the remainder of the Racial Integrity Act. In 2001, the General Assembly overwhelmingly passed a bill (HJ607ER) to express the assembly's profound regret for its role in the eugenics movement. On May 2, 2002, Governor Mark R. Warner issued a statement also expressing "profound regret for the commonwealth's role in the eugenics movement," specifically naming Virginia's 1924 compulsory sterilization legislation. In 2020, the entirety of the Racial Integrity Act was repealed by the General Assembly as part of broader legislative cleanup of obsolete and racially discriminatory acts.

=== Petitions for tribal recognition ===
The Racial Integrity Act had lasting impacts on the ability of Indigenous groups to be formally recognized as tribes, barring them from the land and legal rights that come with that status. For a long time, people pointed to the presence of mixed African and Indigenous ancestry to deny the western Chickahominy Tribe recognition. They finally received it in 1983. Similar events occurred with the Nottoway and Pamunkey tribes, with the Virginia Council of Indians not granting recognition to the Nottoway Tribe until 2006.

=== Social effects ===
In 2004, the Rappahannock excluded a Rappahannock member and her African-American husband from attending their church, but permitted White members into the community. These colonial legacies of racism have formed a concept of identity as racial rather than cultural.

== See also ==
- Anti-miscegenation laws in the United States
- Buck v. Bell (1927)
- Eugenics in the United States
- Immorality Act
- Virginia Sterilization Act of 1924
- Black–white binary
