= Mountain peaks of Virginia =

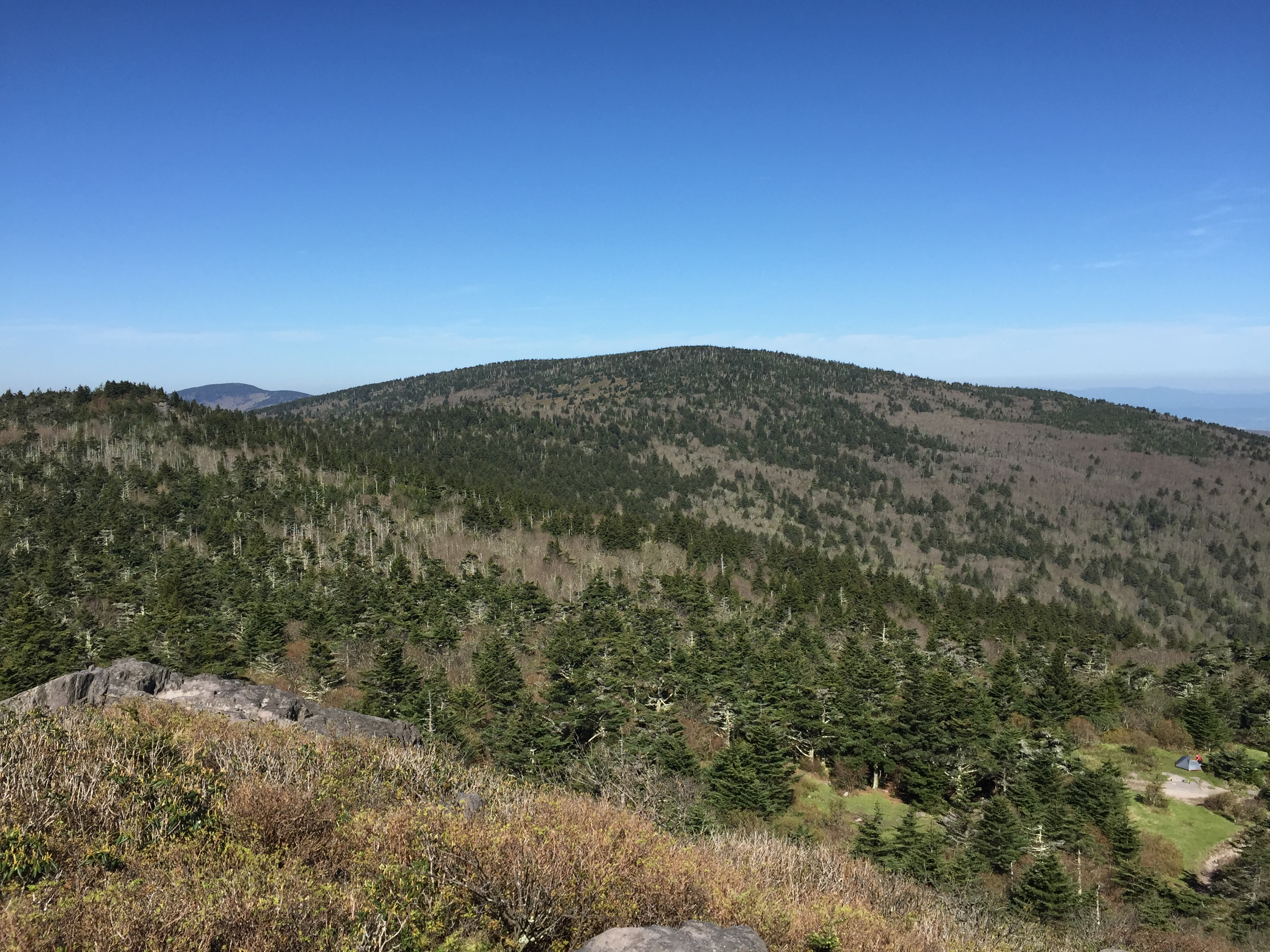
Mount Rogers in the Blue Ridge Mountains is the highest peak in the U.S. Commonwealth of Virginia.

This article comprises three sortable tables of the major mountain peaks of Virginia. This article defines a significant summit as a summit with at least 100 meters (328.1 feet) of topographic prominence, and a major summit as a summit with at least 500 meters (1640 feet) of topographic prominence. All summits in this article have at least 500 meters of topographic prominence. An ultra-prominent summit is a summit with at least 1500 meters (4921 feet) of topographic prominence.

The summit of a mountain or hill may be measured in three principal ways:

1. The topographic elevation of a summit measures the height of the summit above a geodetic sea level. The first table below ranks the major summits of Virginia by elevation.
2. The topographic prominence of a summit is a measure of how high the summit rises above its surroundings. The second table below ranks the 50 most prominent summits of Virginia.
3. The topographic isolation (or radius of dominance) of a summit measures how far the summit lies from its nearest point of equal elevation. The third table below ranks the 11 most isolated major summits of Virginia.

== Highest major summits ==
Of these 11 peaks, 2 in Augusta County, 2 are located in Tazewell County, 2 in Giles County, and the 5 other mountains lie on 9 different counties.

The 11 highest summits of Virginia with over 500 meters of topographic prominence
Rank	Mountain peak	County	Mountain range	Elevation	Prominence	Isolation	Location
1	Mount Rogers (Note: Mount Rogers is the highest summit of Grayson County, Virginia, as well as the state overall.)	Grayson County; Smyth County, Virginia	Blue Ridge Mountains	1746 m 5,728 ft	746 m 2,448 ft	65.2 km 40.5 mi	36.660052°N 81.5449°W
2	Balsam Beartown Mountain (Note: Balsam Beartown Mountain is the highest summit of Tazewell County, Virginia.)	Tazewell County	Ridge-and-Valley Appalachians	1436 m 4,711 ft	650 m 2,133 ft	45.4 km 28.2 mi	37.081416°N 81.413675°W
3	Elliott Knob (Note: Elliott Knob is the highest summit of Augusta County, Virginia.)	Augusta County	Ridge-and-Valley Appalachians	1360 m 4,462 ft	738 m 2,421 ft	43.6 km 27.1 mi	38.166599°N 79.314195°W
4	Morris Knob	Tazewell County	Ridge-and-Valley Appalachians	1353 m 4,439 ft	512 m 1,680 ft	15.83 km 9.84 mi	37.049381°N 81.61697°W
5	Reddish Knob	Augusta County	Ridge-and-Valley Appalachians	1340 m 4,396 ft	608 m 1,995 ft	24.6 km 15.27 mi	38.462525°N 79.241778°W
6	Bald Knob	Giles County	Ridge-and-Valley Appalachians	1329 m 4,360 ft	622 m 2,041 ft	79.9 km 49.6 mi	37.350264°N 80.537358°W
7	Apple Orchard Mountain (Note: Apple Orchard Mountain is the highest summit of both Bedford and Botetourt County, Virginia.)	Bedford County; Botetourt County	Blue Ridge Mountains	1288 m 4,226 ft	861 m 2,825 ft	54.2 km 33.7 mi	37.517352°N 79.510633°W
8	High Knob (Note: High Knob is the highest summit of Wise County, Virginia, as well as the westernmost major summit in the state.)	Wise County	Cumberland Mountains	1287 m 4,222 ft	623 m 2,044 ft	64.9 km 40.3 mi	36.89288°N 82.629431°W
9	Sugar Run Mountain	Giles County	Ridge-and-Valley Appalachians	1246 m 4,088 ft	511 m 1,677 ft	23.4 km 14.54 mi	37.247454°N 80.853793°W
10	Rocky Mountain	Amherst County; Rockbridge County	Blue Ridge Mountains	1241 m 4,072 ft	692 m 2,270 ft	42.1 km 26.2 mi	37.795462°N 79.180842°W
11	Hawksbill Mountain (Note: Hawksbill Mountain is the highest summit of both Madison and Page County, Virginia. It is also the northernmost and easternmost major summit in the state.)	Madison County; Page County	Blue Ridge Mountains	1234 m 4,049 ft	654 m 2,146 ft	64.5 km 40 mi	38.555426°N 78.395296°W

== Most prominent summits ==
The 11 most topographically prominent summits of Virginia
Rank	Mountain peak	County	Mountain range	Elevation	Prominence	Isolation	Location
1	Apple Orchard Mountain	Bedford County; Botetourt County	Blue Ridge Mountains	1288 m 4,226 ft	861 m 2,825 ft	54.2 km 33.7 mi	37.517352°N 79.510633°W
2	Mount Rogers	Grayson County; Smyth County, Virginia	Blue Ridge Mountains	1746 m 5,728 ft	746 m 2,448 ft	65.2 km 40.5 mi	36.660052°N 81.5449°W
3	Elliott Knob	Augusta County	Ridge-and-Valley Appalachians	1360 m 4,462 ft	738 m 2,421 ft	43.6 km 27.1 mi	38.166599°N 79.314195°W
4	Rocky Mountain	Amherst County; Rockbridge County	Blue Ridge Mountains	1241 m 4,072 ft	692 m 2,270 ft	42.1 km 26.2 mi	37.795462°N 79.180842°W
5	Hawksbill Mountain	Madison County; Page County	Blue Ridge Mountains	1234 m 4,049 ft	654 m 2,146 ft	64.5 km 40 mi	38.555426°N 78.395296°W
6	Balsam Beartown Mountain	Tazewell County	Ridge-and-Valley Appalachians	1436 m 4,711 ft	650 m 2,133 ft	45.4 km 28.2 mi	37.081416°N 81.413675°W
7	High Knob	Wise County	Cumberland Mountains	1287 m 4,222 ft	623 m 2,044 ft	64.9 km 40.3 mi	36.89288°N 82.629431°W
8	Bald Knob	Giles County	Ridge-and-Valley Appalachians	1329 m 4,360 ft	622 m 2,041 ft	79.9 km 49.6 mi	37.350264°N 80.537358°W
9	Reddish Knob	Augusta County	Ridge-and-Valley Appalachians	1340 m 4,396 ft	608 m 1,995 ft	24.6 km 15.27 mi	38.462525°N 79.241778°W
10	Morris Knob	Tazewell County	Ridge-and-Valley Appalachians	1353 m 4,439 ft	512 m 1,680 ft	15.83 km 9.84 mi	37.049381°N 81.61697°W
11	Sugar Run Mountain	Giles County	Ridge-and-Valley Appalachians	1246 m 4,088 ft	511 m 1,677 ft	23.4 km 14.54 mi	37.247454°N 80.853793°W

== Most isolated major summits ==
The 11 most topographically isolated summits of Virginia with at least 500 metres of topographic prominence
Rank	Mountain peak	County	Mountain range	Elevation	Prominence	Isolation	Location
1	Bald Knob	Giles County	Ridge-and-Valley Appalachians	1329 m 4,360 ft	622 m 2,041 ft	79.9 km 49.6 mi	37.350264°N 80.537358°W
2	Mount Rogers	Grayson County; Smyth County, Virginia	Blue Ridge Mountains	1746 m 5,728 ft	746 m 2,448 ft	65.2 km 40.5 mi	36.660052°N 81.5449°W
3	High Knob	Wise County	Cumberland Mountains	1287 m 4,222 ft	623 m 2,044 ft	64.9 km 40.3 mi	36.89288°N 82.629431°W
4	Hawksbill Mountain	Madison County; Page County	Blue Ridge Mountains	1234 m 4,049 ft	654 m 2,146 ft	64.5 km 40 mi	38.555426°N 78.395296°W
5	Apple Orchard Mountain	Bedford County; Botetourt County	Blue Ridge Mountains	1288 m 4,226 ft	861 m 2,825 ft	54.2 km 33.7 mi	37.517352°N 79.510633°W
6	Balsam Beartown Mountain	Tazewell County	Ridge-and-Valley Appalachians	1436 m 4,711 ft	650 m 2,133 ft	45.4 km 28.2 mi	37.081416°N 81.413675°W
7	Elliott Knob	Augusta County	Ridge-and-Valley Appalachians	1360 m 4,462 ft	738 m 2,421 ft	43.6 km 27.1 mi	38.166599°N 79.314195°W
8	Rocky Mountain	Amherst County; Rockbridge County	Blue Ridge Mountains	1241 m 4,072 ft	692 m 2,270 ft	42.1 km 26.2 mi	37.795462°N 79.180842°W
9	Reddish Knob	Augusta County	Ridge-and-Valley Appalachians	1340 m 4,396 ft	608 m 1,995 ft	24.6 km 15.27 mi	38.462525°N 79.241778°W
10	Sugar Run Mountain	Giles County	Ridge-and-Valley Appalachians	1246 m 4,088 ft	511 m 1,677 ft	23.4 km 14.54 mi	37.247454°N 80.853793°W
11	Morris Knob	Tazewell County	Ridge-and-Valley Appalachians	1353 m 4,439 ft	512 m 1,680 ft	15.83 km 9.84 mi	37.049381°N 81.61697°W
