= Hawksbill Mountain =

Mountain in Virginia, United States

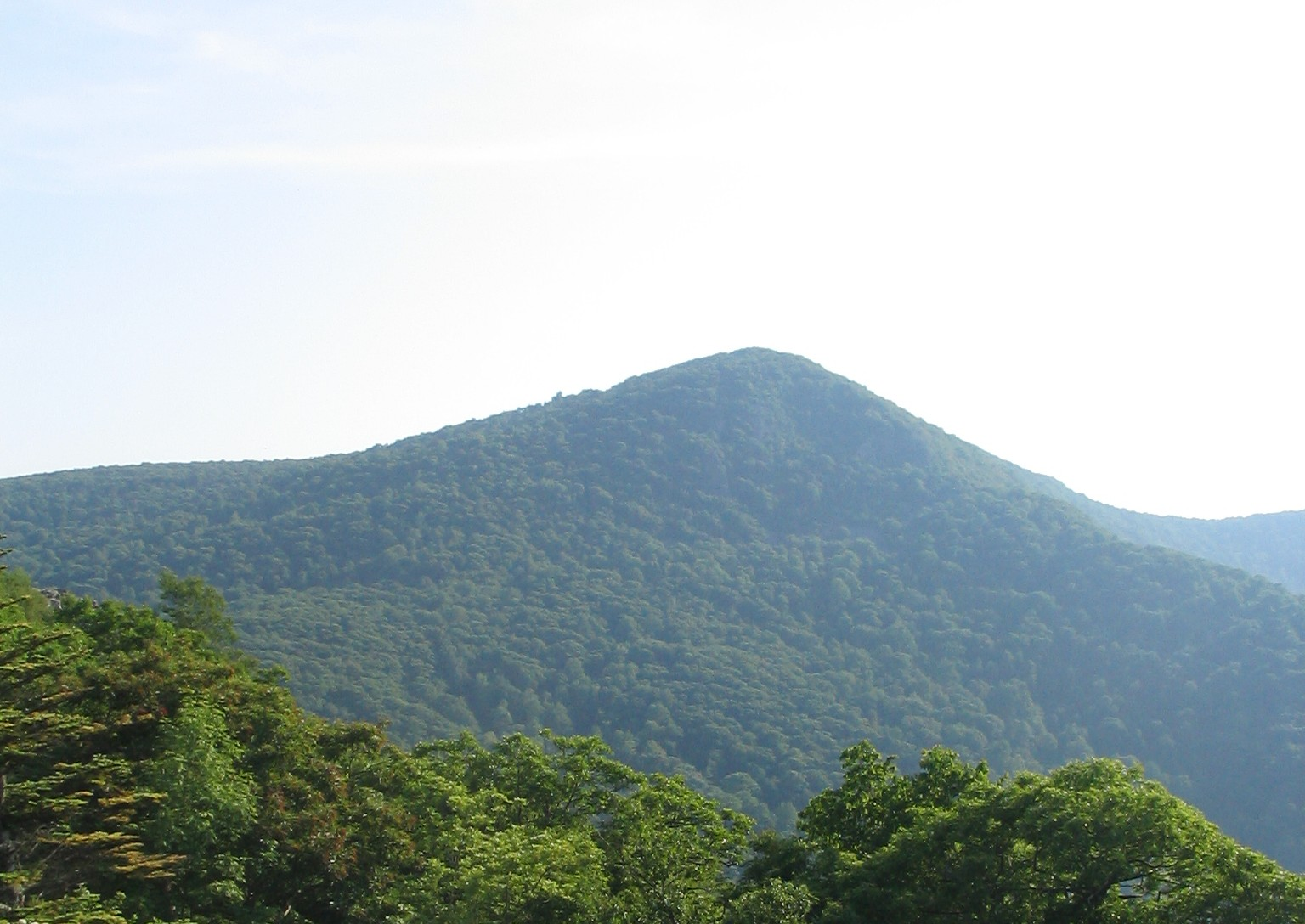
- Hawksbill Mountain from the north

Highest point
- Elevation: 4,050 feet (1,234 m)
- Prominence: 2,148 ft (655 m)
- Listing: List of mountains in Virginia
- Coordinates: 38°33′19″N 78°23′42″W

Geography
- Location within Virginia
- Location: Madison / Page counties, Virginia, United States
- Parent range: Appalachian Mountains, Blue Ridge Mountains
- Topo map: USGS Big Meadows

Geology
- Mountain type(s): metamorphic basalt, more commonly known as greenstone

Climbing
- Easiest route: Hike

Hawksbill Mountain is a mountain with an elevation of 4,050 feet (1,234 m). Marking the border between Madison County and Page County in Virginia, the summit of Hawksbill Mountain is the highest point in Shenandoah National Park as well as the highest point in both Madison and Page Counties.

The north face of Hawksbill Peak is a 2,500-foot (760 m) drop into Timber Hollow, which is the largest elevation change in the park. The summit is one of the few places in Shenandoah National Park where one can find balsam fir, a tree more typical of northern New England and southeast Canada.

The National Park Service has constructed a stone observation platform at the summit. Byrd's Nest No. 2, one of a series of shelters built in the park by Senator Harry Byrd, is nearby. Hawksbill peak is also the site of a peregrine falcon restoration project. The summit of Hawksbill Mountain can be reached by a short hike from a trailhead located at the Upper Hawksbill parking area, just off of Skyline Drive in Shenandoah National Park. A number of other hiking trails lead to the summit of Hawksbill, while the Appalachian Trail goes around and about 500 ft (150 m) in elevation below the summit.

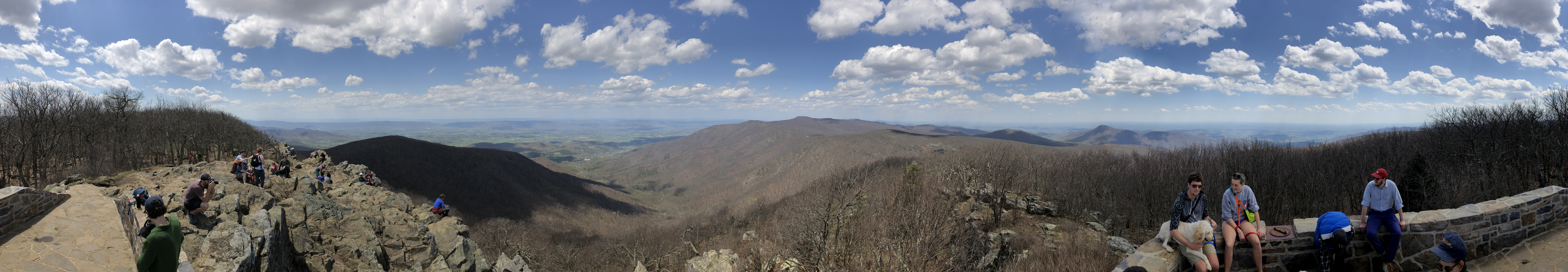
360-degree panorama from the top of Hawksbill Mountain

== Gallery ==
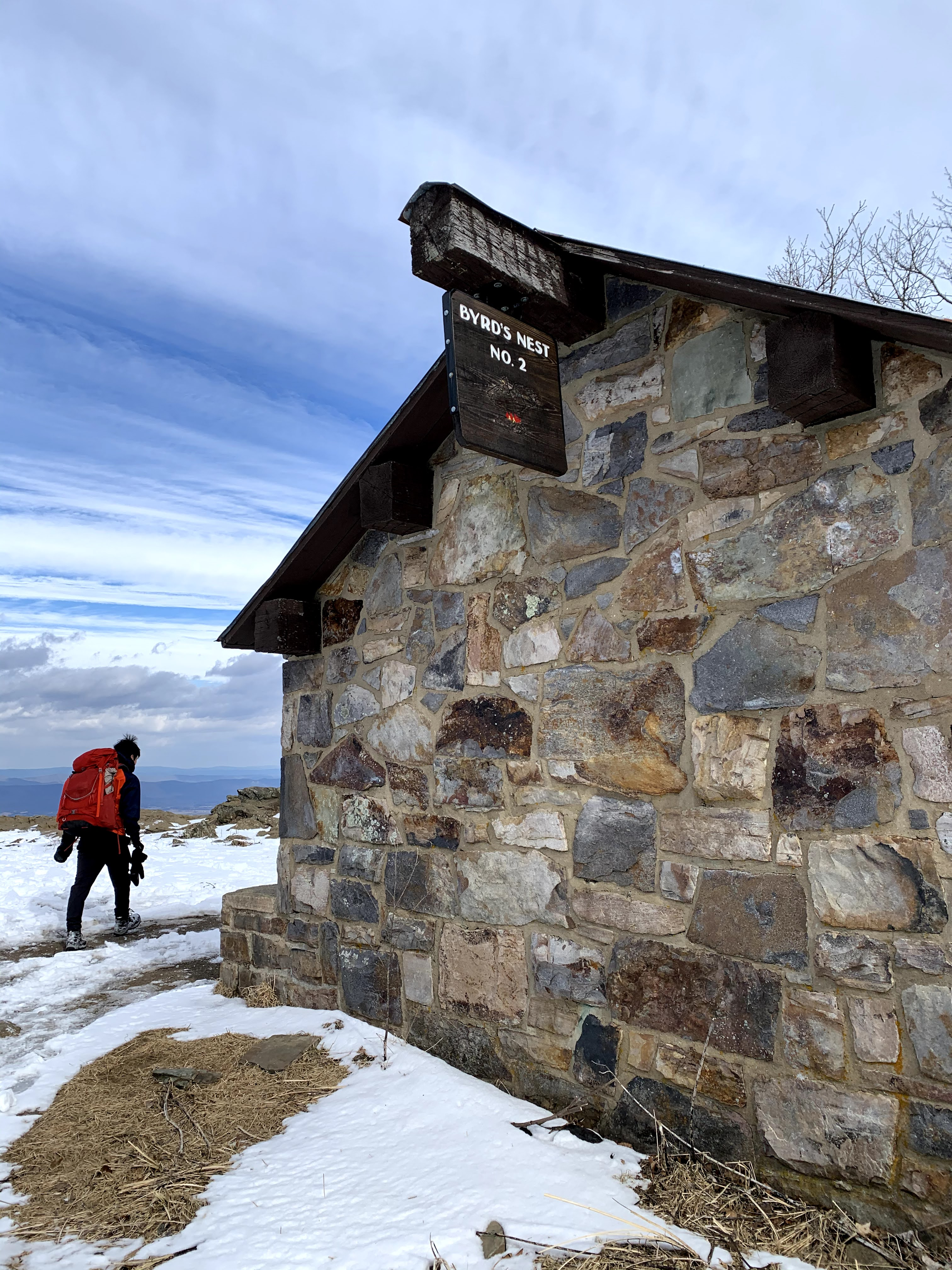
Byrd's Nest Shelter No. 2

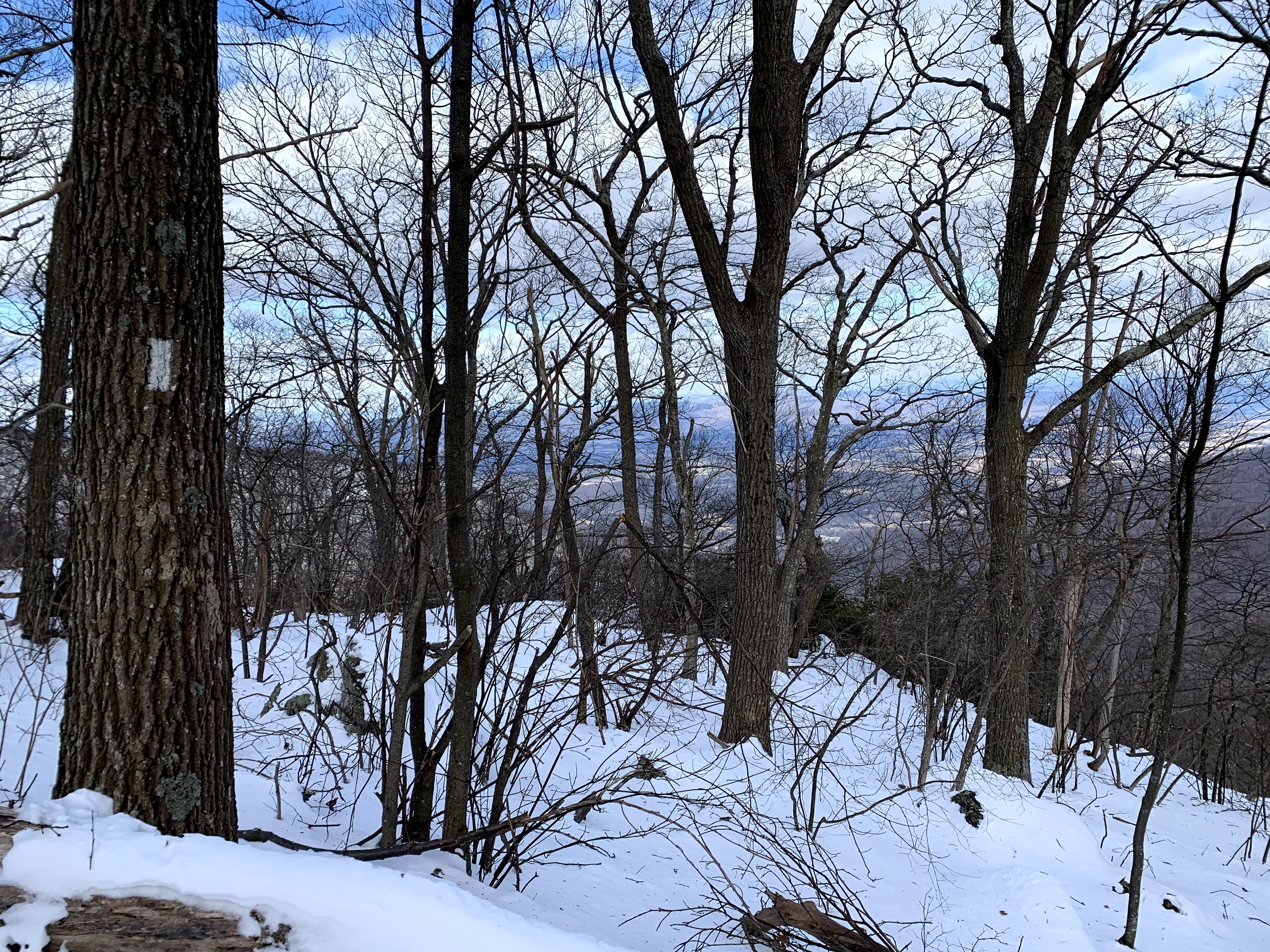
Appalachian Trail Blaze en route to Hawksbill Summit

== See also ==
- List of mountains in Virginia
- Mountain peaks of Virginia
