= Balsam Beartown Mountain =

Mountain in Virginia, United States

- Location within Virginia

Highest point
- Elevation: 4,710 ft (1,440 m)
- Prominence: 2,130 ft (650 m)
- Isolation: 28.2 mi (45.4 km)
- Coordinates: 37°04′53″N 81°24′49″W

Geography
- Location: Virginia, United States
- Parent range: Appalachian Mountains

Balsam Beartown Mountain is a mountain located in Tazewell County, Virginia, in the United States. The mountain is the sixth-highest mountain in Virginia by elevation, sixth in the state by prominence, as well as sixth in the state by isolation.
