= Appalachian Mountains =

Mountain range in eastern North America

- Appalachians
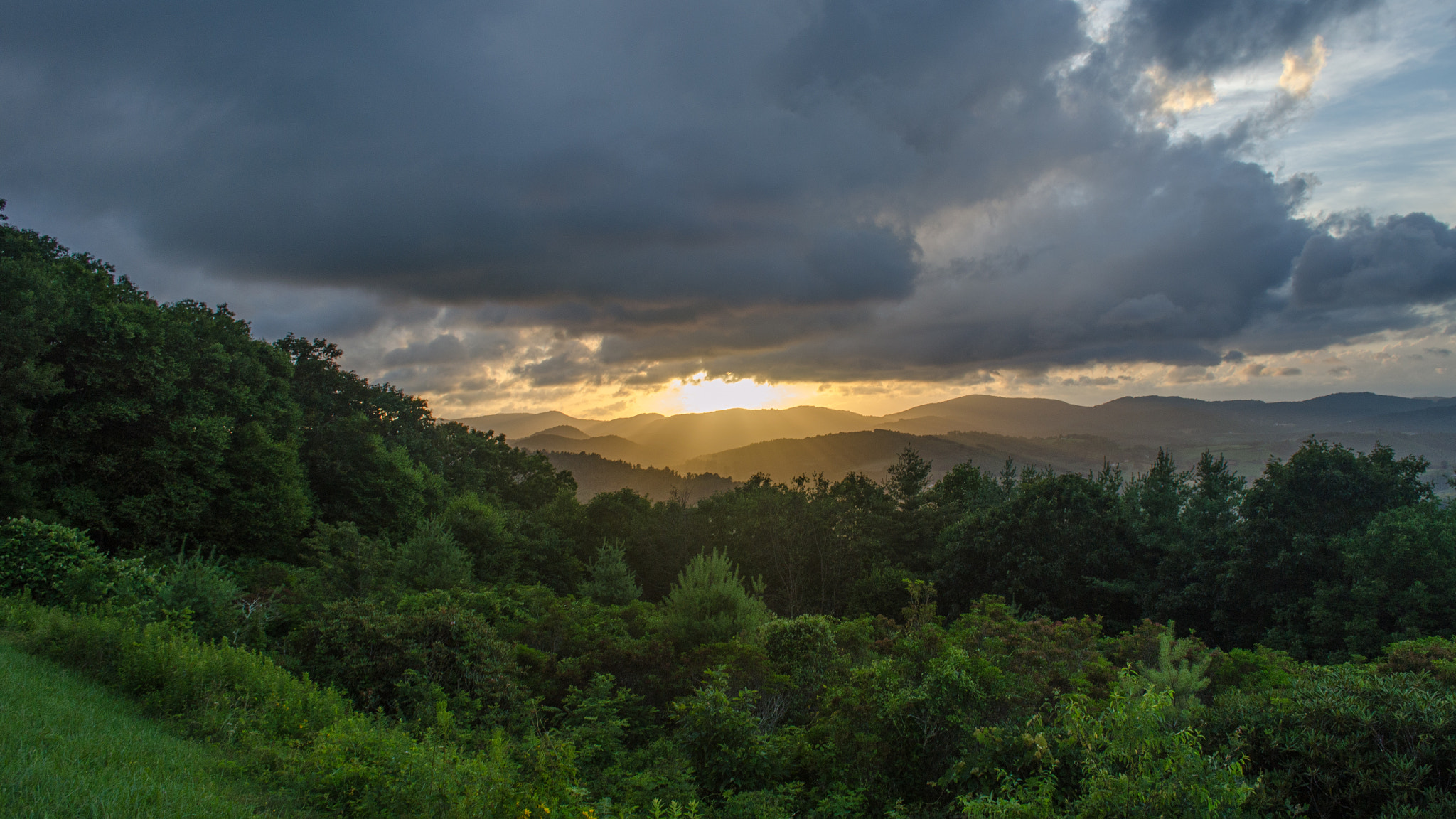
- The Blue Ridge Mountains, part of the Appalachian chain, near Sparta, North Carolina

Highest point
- Peak: Mount Mitchell in Yancey County, North Carolina, U.S.
- Elevation: 6,684 ft (2,037 m)

Dimensions
- Length: 2,050 mi (3,300 km)

Geography
- Countries: United States; Canada; France (Saint Pierre and Miquelon)
- Region: Appalachia
- Province/ State: Newfoundland and Labrador; Saint Pierre and Miquelon; Quebec; Nova Scotia; New Brunswick; Maine; New Hampshire; Vermont; Massachusetts; Connecticut; New York; New Jersey; Pennsylvania; Maryland; Washington, D.C.; Delaware; Virginia; West Virginia; Ohio; Kentucky; Tennessee; North Carolina; South Carolina; Georgia; Alabama

Geology
- Orogenies: Grenville, Taconic, Acadian, Alleghanian
- Rock age(s): Mesoproterozoic era (Stenian period)–Paleozoic era (Permian period); 1.2 billion years ago to 300 million years ago

The Appalachian Mountains are a vast mountain range situated in eastern North America, extending roughly 2,050 miles (3,300 km) from central Alabama to Newfoundland along a generally southwest–northeast axis. Alongside the Appalachian Plateau province—with which they are not entirely synonymous—the mountains form a wider system comprising the region's backbone. The range's highest peak is 6,684-foot (2,037 m) Mount Mitchell in the Black Mountains subrange of North Carolina, which themselves are part of the larger Blue Ridge Mountains. Saint Pierre and Miquelon, an overseas collectivity of France, is part of the range, meaning it technically spans portions of three countries. It is geologically related to the Scottish Highlands, Atlas Mountains, Scandinavian Mountains, and Ouachitas, as these ranges all originally belonged to the sprawling Central Pangean Mountains before plate tectonics tore them apart.

The geologic processes that led to the formation of the Appalachian Mountains started around 1.1 billion years ago with the creation of supercontinent Rodinia, and many Precambrian rocks and minerals created via this process remain visible today in the range's outcrops. The modern Appalachians and their relatives themselves were created by a series of three distinct orogenies beginning approximately 480 million years ago, (Note: Many internet sources cite 480 million years as the age of the Appalachians. This statement ignores some of the highest and most prominent features of the range that exposes scientifically-dated metamorphic rocks that are at least 1 billion years old.) making them one of the oldest surviving mountain ranges in the world. The young Appalachians reached elevations similar to today's Alps and Rockies—both of which are significantly younger mountain ranges—before 240 million years of natural erosion by water, wind, ice, and gravity gradually morphed them into the lower, rugged peaks typically seen today.

Considering their extensive length, the Appalachians contain a diverse selection of biomes ranging from the temperate broadleaf and mixed Appalachian-Blue Ridge forest in the south to the boreal Eastern Canadian forest in the north. Conifers like red spruce and balsam fir dominate the north and high elevations, while deciduous trees like sugar maple and beech are more prevalent further south and oak-chestnut forests reign between. The climate ranges from humid subtropical to subarctic, with a few peaks in the Presidential Range of New Hampshire's White Mountains having a true tundra climate; many locations are also oceanic or humid continental. Mammals like black bear, white-tailed deer, squirrels, raccoons, and skunks are common throughout the range, while others like moose are more regionally limited. Birds, fish, shellfish, amphibians like salamanders, and other invertebrates are also found in the profoundly ecologically diverse region. Once-largely extirpated species like the bobcat and coyote have also made a resurgence in recent years.

The Appalachian Mountains are a barrier to east–west travel, as they form a series of alternating ridgelines and valleys oriented in opposition to most highways and railroads running east–west. This barrier was extremely important in shaping the expansion of the United States in the colonial era. Much of the range's economy was historically based on logging and coal mining, which attracted many migrants who contributed to the genesis of a new cultural region. Though the decline of these industries was an economic detriment, many communities have pivoted to manufacturing and services. Tourism has also become increasingly prevalent: the mountains are home to the very popular Appalachian Trail, a 2,175-mile (3,500 km) hiking trail that runs from Mount Katahdin in Maine to Springer Mountain in Georgia. The International Appalachian Trail is an extension of this hiking trail into the Appalachian range in the Atlantic Provinces of Canada.

== Etymology ==
While exploring inland along the northern coast of Florida in 1528, the members of the Narváez expedition, including Álvar Núñez Cabeza de Vaca, found a Native American village near present-day Tallahassee, Florida, the name of which they transcribed as Apalchen or Apalachen (Apalachee pronunciation: [a.paˈla.tʃɛn]). The name was soon altered by the Spanish to Apalachee and used as a name for the tribe and region spreading well inland to the north. Pánfilo de Narváez's expedition first entered Apalachee territory on June 15, 1528, and applied the name. Now spelled "Appalachian", it is the fourth-oldest surviving European place-name in the US.

After the 1540 expedition of Hernando de Soto, Spanish cartographers began to apply the name of the tribe to the mountains themselves. The first cartographic appearance of Apalchen is on Diego Gutiérrez's map of 1562; the first use for the mountain range is the map of Jacques le Moyne de Morgues in 1565.

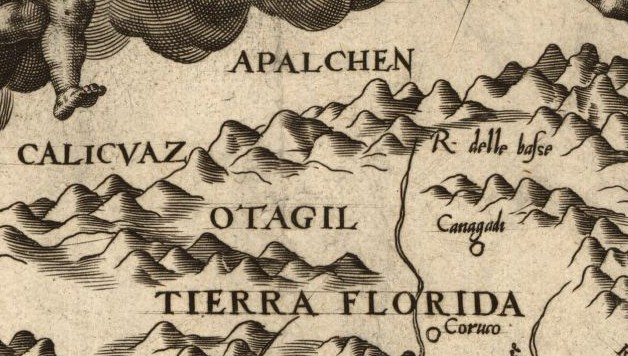
Diego Gutiérrez's 1562 map of the Western Hemisphere showing the first known use of a variation of the place name Appalachia ("Apalchen") from his map, Americae Sive Quartae Orbis Partis Nova Et Exactissima Descriptio

The name was not commonly used for the whole mountain range until the late 19th century. A competing and often more popular name was the "Allegheny Mountains", "Alleghenies", and even "Alleghania". In the early 19th century, Washington Irving proposed renaming the United States either Appalachia or Alleghania.

In U.S. dialects in most regions of the Appalachians, the word is pronounced /ˌæpəˈlætʃɪnz/, with the third syllable sounding like "latch". In some northern parts of the mountain range, particularly Pennsylvania, it is pronounced /ˌæpəˈleɪtʃɪnz/ or /ˌæpəˈleɪʃɪnz/; the third syllable is like "lay", and the fourth "chins" or "shins". There is often great debate between the residents of the regions regarding the correct pronunciation. Elsewhere, a commonly accepted pronunciation for the adjective Appalachian is /ˌæpəˈlætʃiən/, with the last two syllables "-ian" pronounced as in the word "Romanian".

== Geography ==
Perhaps partly because the range runs through large portions of both the United States and Canada, and partly because the range was formed over numerous geologic time periods, one of which is sometimes termed the Appalachian orogeny, writing communities struggle to agree on an encyclopedic definition of the mountain range. However, each of the governments has an agency that informs the public about the major landforms that make up the countries, the United States Geological Survey (USGS) and the Geological Survey of Canada (GSC). The landforms are referred to as physiographic regions. The regions create precise boundaries from which maps can be drawn. The Appalachian Highlands is the name of one of the eight physiographic regions of the contiguous 48 United States. The Appalachian Uplands is the name of one of seven physiographic regions of Canada.

=== Appalachian Highlands of the United States ===
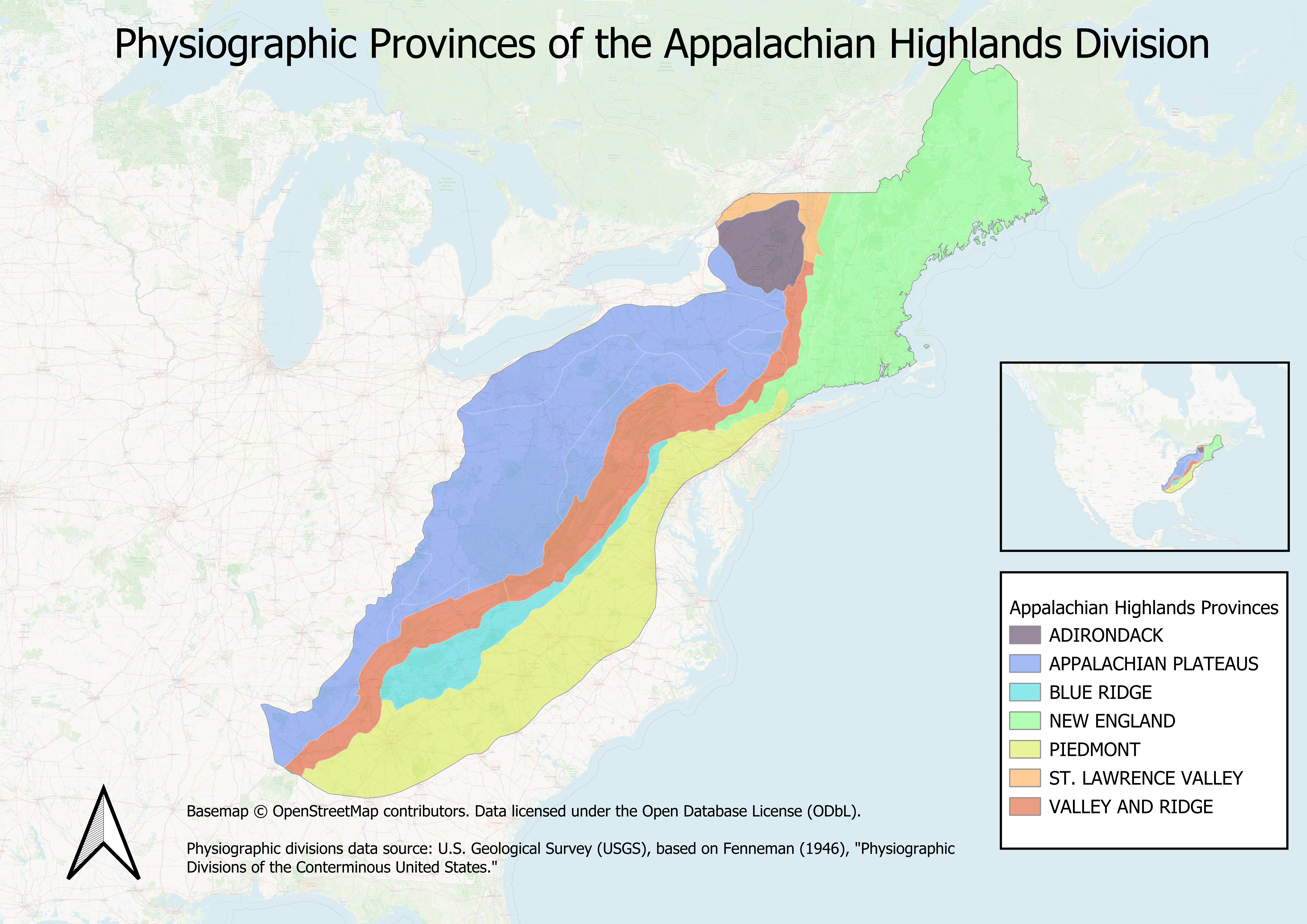
Physiographic Provinces of the Appalachian Highlands Division

The second level in the physiographic classification schema for the USGS is "province", the same word as Canada uses to divide its political subdivisions, meaning that the terminology used by the two countries do not match below the region level. The lowest level of classification is "section".

- Piedmont, including the Uplands and Lowlands sections
- Blue Ridge, including the Northern and Southern sections
- Valley and Ridge, including Tennessee, Middle, and Hudson Valley sections
- St. Lawrence Valley, including only the Champlain section (Note: Originally the intent was that there would be two sections, the Champlain and the Northern section, however the dividing line was never officially determined)
- Appalachian Plateaus, including the Mohawk, Catskill, Southern New York, Allegheny Mountains, Kanawha, Cumberland Plateau, and Cumberland Mountain sections
- New England, including the Seaboard Lowland, New England Upland, White Mountains, Green Mountains, and Taconic Mountains
- Adirondack with no sections

=== Appalachian Uplands of Canada ===
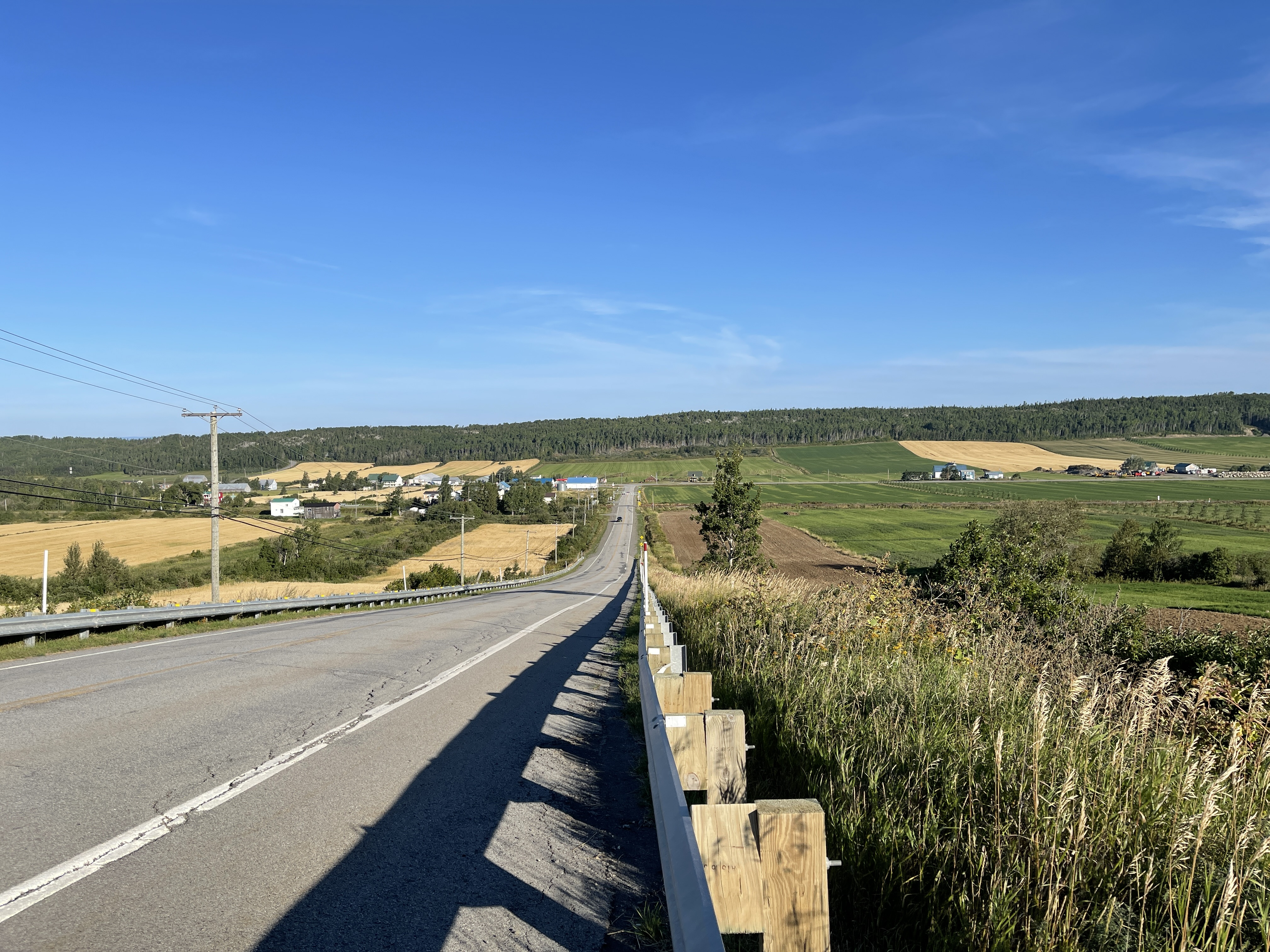
The hills of the Notre Dame Mountains in Quebec, Canada

The Appalachian Uplands are one of the seven physiographic divisions in Canada. Canada's GSC does not use the same classification system as the USGS below the division level. The agency does break the divisions of the Appalachian Uplands into 13 subsections that are in four different political provinces of Canada.

- Newfoundland contains the Newfoundland Highlands, Atlantic Uplands, and Central Lowlands.
- Nova Scotia contains the Atlantic Uplands, Nova Scotia Uplands, and the Annapolis Lowlands
- New Brunswick contains the New Brunswick Highlands, the Chaleur Uplands, and the Maritime Plain
- Quebec contains the Notre Dame Mountains, Eastern Quebec Uplands, Sutton Mountains, and Mégantic Hills

While the Appalachian Highlands and Appalachian Uplands are generally continuous across the U.S./Canadian border, the St. Lawrence Valley area is handled differently in the physiographic classification schemas. The part of the St. Lawrence Valley in the United States is one of the second-level classifications, part of the Appalachian Highlands. In Canada, the area is part of the first-level classification, the St. Lawrence Lowlands. This includes the area around the city of Montreal, Anticosti Island, and the northwest coastline of Newfoundland. The dissected plateau area, while not actually made up of geological mountains, is popularly called "mountains", especially in eastern Kentucky and West Virginia, and while the ridges are not high, the terrain is extremely rugged. In Ohio and New York, some of the plateau has been glaciated, which has rounded off the sharp ridges and filled the valleys to some extent. The glaciated regions are usually referred to as hill country rather than mountains.

=== Range characteristics ===
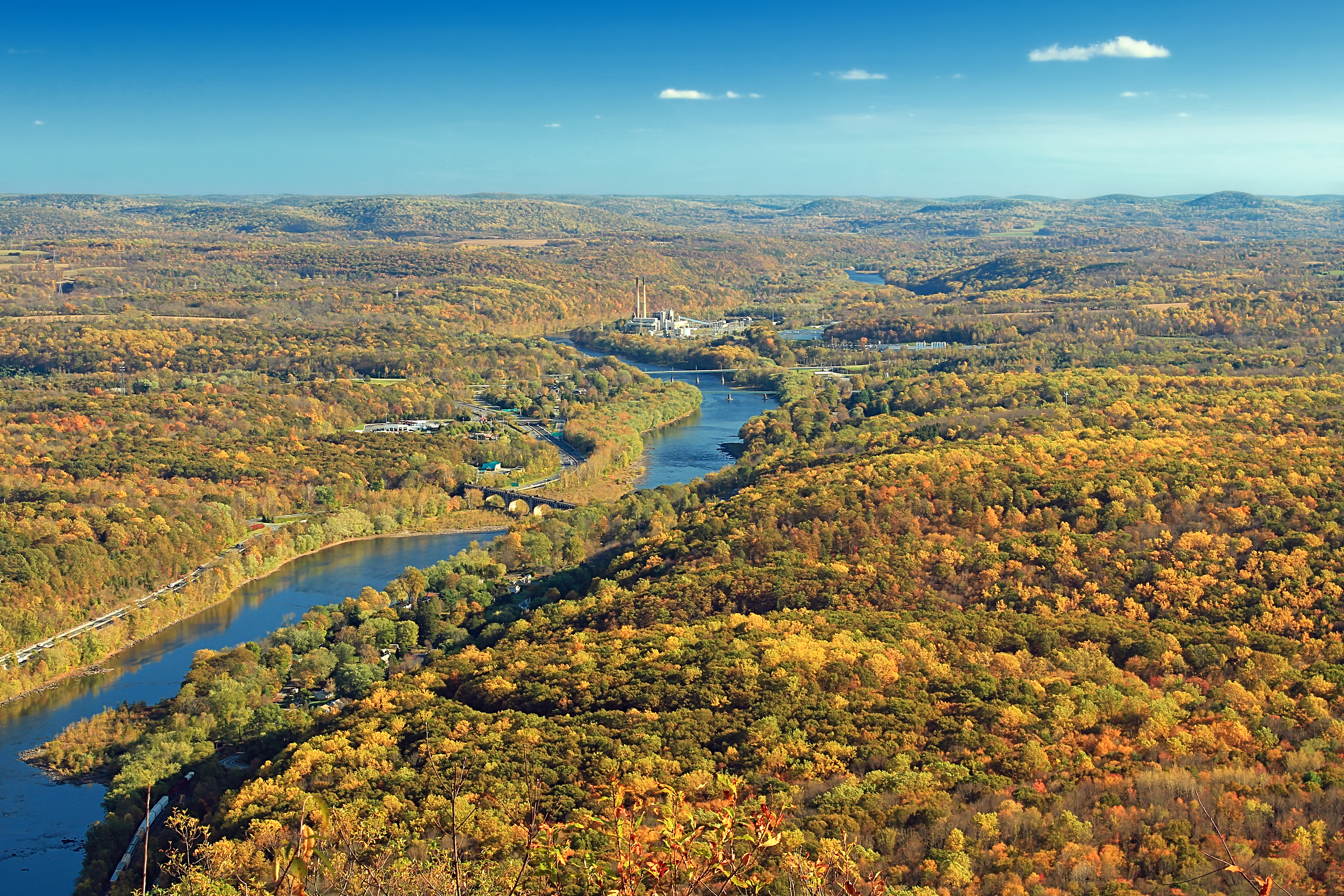
The Appalachian Trail at Mount Minsi in Northampton County, Pennsylvania, in the Lehigh Valley

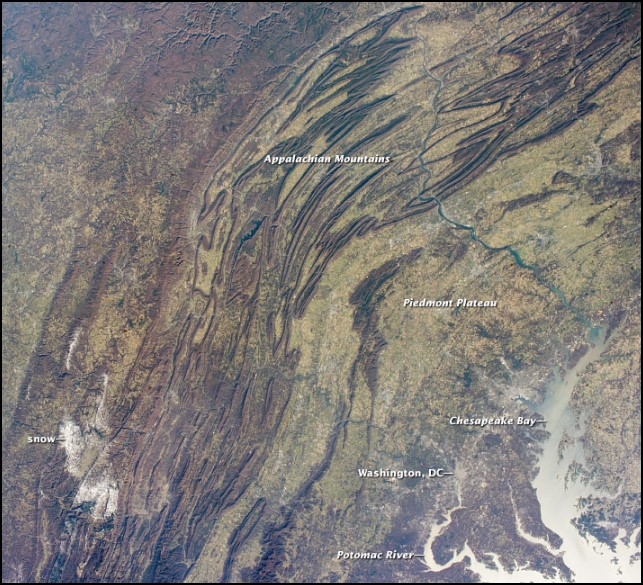
The Appalachian Mountains seen from the International Space Station

The Appalachian belt includes the plateaus sloping southward to the Atlantic Ocean in New England, and southeastward to the border of the coastal plain through the central and southern Atlantic states; and on the northwest, the Allegheny and Cumberland plateaus declining toward the Great Lakes and the interior plains. A remarkable feature of the belt is the longitudinal chain of broad valleys, including the Great Appalachian Valley, which in the southerly sections divides the mountain system into two unequal portions, but in the northernmost lies west of all the ranges possessing typical Appalachian features, and separates them from the Adirondack group. The mountain system has no axis of dominating altitudes, but in every portion, the summits rise to rather uniform heights, and, especially in the central section, the various ridges and intermontane valleys have the same trend as the system itself. None of the summits reaches the region of perpetual snow.

In Pennsylvania, there are over sixty summits that rise over 2,500 ft (800 m); the summits of Mount Davis and Blue Knob rise over 3,000 ft (900 m). In Maryland, Eagle Rock and Dans Mountain are conspicuous points reaching 3,162 and 2,882 ft (964 and 878 m) respectively. On the same side of the Great Valley, south of the Potomac, are the Pinnacle 3,007 feet (917 m) and Pigeon Roost 3,400 ft (1,000 m). In West Virginia, more than 150 peaks rise above 4,000 ft (1,200 m), including Spruce Knob 4,863 ft (1,482 m), the highest point in the Allegheny Mountains. A number of other points in the state rise above 4,800 ft (1,500 m). Cheat Mountain (Snowshoe Mountain) at Thorny Flat 4,848 ft (1,478 m) and Bald Knob 4,842 ft (1,476 m) are among the more notable peaks in West Virginia.

The Blue Ridge Mountains, rising in southern Pennsylvania and there known as South Mountain, attain elevations of about 2,000 ft (600 m) in Pennsylvania. South Mountain achieves its highest point just below the Mason-Dixon line in Maryland at Quirauk Mountain 2,145 ft (654 m) and then diminishes in height southward to the Potomac River. Once in Virginia, the Blue Ridge again reaches 2,000 ft (600 m) and higher. In the Virginia Blue Ridge, the following are some of the highest peaks north of the Roanoke River: Stony Man 4,031 ft (1,229 m), Hawksbill Mountain 4,066 ft (1,239 m), Apple Orchard Mountain 4,225 ft (1,288 m) and Peaks of Otter 4,001 and 3,875 ft (1,220 and 1,181 m). South of the Roanoke River, along the Blue Ridge, are Virginia's highest peaks including Whitetop Mountain 5,520 ft (1,680 m) and Mount Rogers 5,729 ft (1,746 m), the highest point in the Commonwealth.

Chief summits in the southern section of the Blue Ridge are located along two main crests, the Western or Unaka Front along the Tennessee-North Carolina border and the Eastern Front in North Carolina, or one of several "cross ridges" between the two main crests. Major subranges of the Eastern Front include the Black Mountains, Great Craggy Mountains, and Great Balsam Mountains, and its chief summits include Grandfather Mountain 5,964 ft (1,818 m) near the Tennessee-North Carolina border, Mount Mitchell 6,684 ft (2,037 m) in the Blacks, and Black Balsam Knob 6,214 ft (1,894 m) and Cold Mountain 6,030 ft (1,840 m) in the Great Balsams. The Western Blue Ridge Front is subdivided into the Unaka Range, the Bald Mountains, the Great Smoky Mountains, and the Unicoi Mountains, and its major peaks include Roan Mountain 6,285 ft (1,916 m) in the Unakas, Big Bald 5,516 ft (1,681 m) and Max Patch 4,616 ft (1,407 m) in the Bald Mountains, Kuwohi 6,643 ft (2,025 m), Mount Le Conte 6,593 feet (2,010 m), and Mount Guyot 6,621 ft (2,018 m) in the Great Smokies, and Big Frog Mountain 4,224 ft (1,287 m) near the Tennessee-Georgia-North Carolina border. Prominent summits in the cross ridges include Waterrock Knob (6,292 ft (1,918 m)) in the Plott Balsams. Across northern Georgia, numerous peaks exceed 4,000 ft (1,200 m), including Brasstown Bald, the state's highest, at 4,784-and-4,696 ft (1,458-and-1,431 m) Rabun Bald. In north-central Alabama, Mount Cheaha rises prominently to 1,445 feet (440 m) over its surroundings, as part of the southernmost spur of the Blue Ridge Mountains.

Highest peaks in each U.S. state and Canadian province in the Appalachian Mountains
State or Province	Country	Physiographic Area	Highest Peak	Elev. (feet)	Elev. (meters)	Geographic Coordinates
Alabama	US	Appalachian Plateau	Cheaha Mountain	2,407	734	33.4869° N 85.8091° W
Connecticut	US	New England	Bear Mountain	2,316	706	42.0241° N 73.2716° W
Georgia	US	Blue Ridge	Brasstown Bald	4,784	1,457	34.8745° N 83.8063° W
Kentucky	US	Appalachian Plateau	Black Mountain	4,145	1,263	36.9022° N 82.9144° W
Maine	US	New England	Mount Katahdin	5,269	1,606	45.9046° N 68.9216° W
Maryland	US	Appalachian Plateau	Backbone Mountain	3,360	1,024	39.4049° N 79.2911° W
Massachusetts	US	New England	Mount Greylock	3,489	1,063	42.3813° N 73.0957° W
New Brunswick	Canada	Chaleur Uplands	Mount Carleton	2,690	820	47.2241° N 66.5233° W
Newfoundland	Canada	Newfoundland	The Cabox	2,664	812	48.4959° N 58.2903° W
New Hampshire	US	New England	Mount Washington	6,288	1,917	44.1614° N 71.1811° W
New Jersey	US	Valley and Ridge	High Point	1,804	550	41.3206° N 74.6616° W
New York	US	Adirondacks	Mount Marcy	5,344	1,629	44.1126° N 73.9235° W
North Carolina	US	Blue Ridge	Mount Mitchell	6,684	2,037	35.7658° N 82.2655° W
Nova Scotia	Canada	Nova Scotia Highlands	White Hill	1,755	535	46.7555° N 60.6350° W
Ohio	US	Appalachian Plateau	Campbell Hill	1,549	472	40.3888° N 83.6381° W
Pennsylvania	US	Appalachian Plateau	Mount Davis	3,213	979	39.7866° N 79.1751° W
Quebec	Canada	Notre Dame Mountains	Mont Jacques-Cartier	4,160	1,268	48.9906° N 65.9425° W
South Carolina	US	Blue Ridge	Sassafras Mountain	3,553	1,083	35.0632° N 82.3062° W
Tennessee	US	Blue Ridge	Kuwohi	6,643	2,025	35.5625° N 83.4989° W
Vermont	US	Green Mountains	Mount Mansfield	4,395	1,340	44.5439° N 72.8143° W
Virginia	US	Blue Ridge	Mount Rogers	5,729	1,746	36.6586° N 81.5438° W
West Virginia	US	Appalachian Plateau	Spruce Knob	4,863	1,482	38.6992° N 79.5327° W

=== Categorization of Appalachian mountains before physiographic regions ===
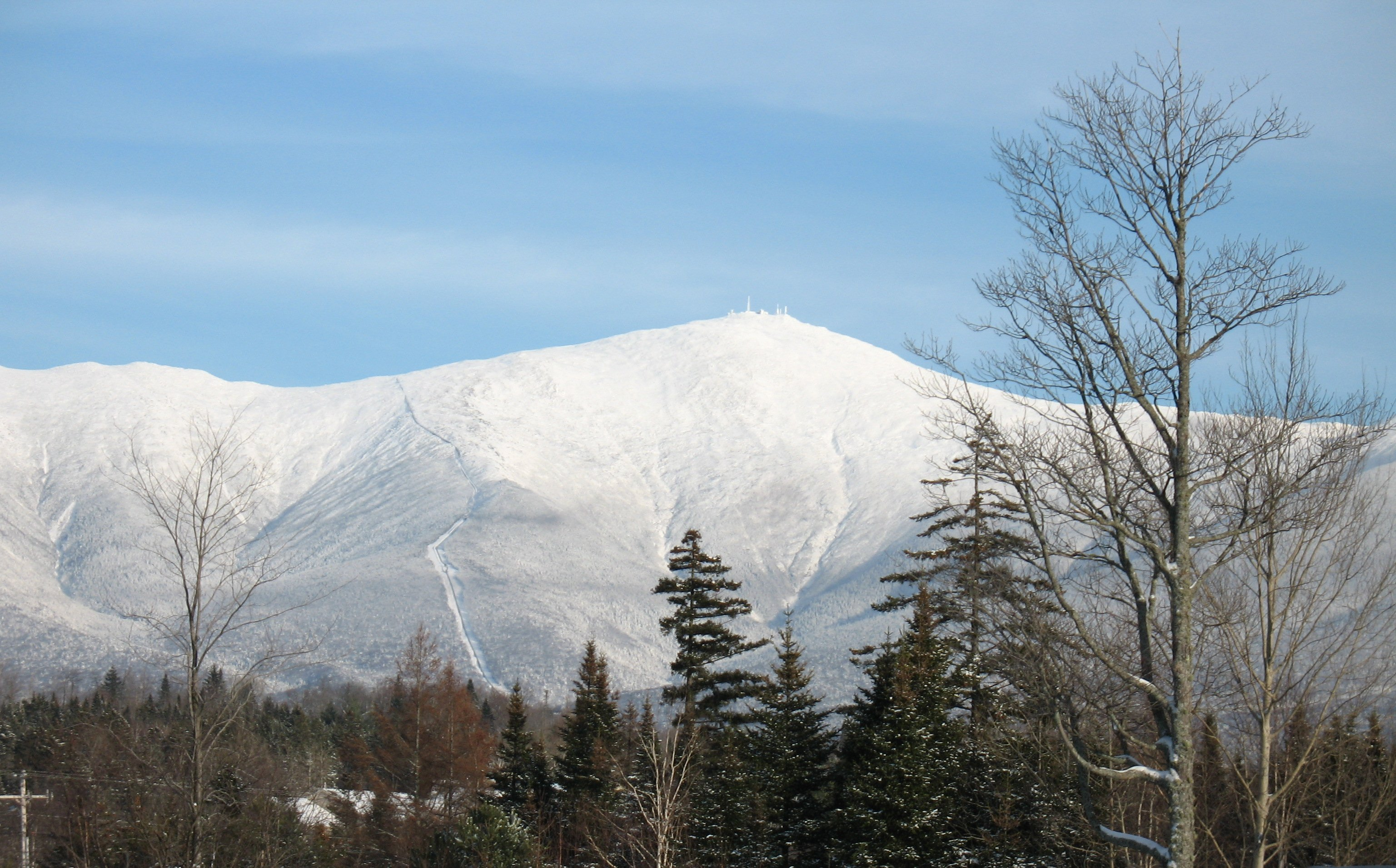
Mount Washington in New Hampshire, seen from Bretton Woods

Sources written prior to the recognition of the concept of physiographic regions divided the Appalachian Mountains into three major sections: (Note: Description used by 1911 Encyclopedia Britannica that is now in the public domain)

- Northern: The northern section runs from the Canadian province of Newfoundland and Labrador to the Hudson River. It includes the Long Range Mountains and Annieopsquotch Mountains on the island of Newfoundland, the French Territorial Collectivity of Saint-Pierre and Miquelon southwest of Newfoundland, Chic-Choc Mountains and Notre Dame Range in Quebec and New Brunswick, scattered elevations and small ranges elsewhere in Nova Scotia and New Brunswick, the Longfellow Mountains in Maine, the White Mountains in New Hampshire, the Green Mountains in Vermont, and The Berkshires in Massachusetts, and Connecticut, the Metacomet Ridge Mountains in Connecticut and south-central Massachusetts, and the Adirondack Mountains in New York are all part of the Appalachian Mountains as defined by the governments of Canada and the United States.
  Mountains of the Long Range in Newfoundland, such as the Cabox and Gros Morne, reach heights of nearly 2,700 ft (800 m). In the Chic-Choc and Notre Dame Mountain ranges in Quebec, the higher summits rise above 4,000 ft (1,200 m) in elevation. Isolated peaks and small ranges in Nova Scotia and New Brunswick vary from 1,000 to 2,700 ft (300 to 800 m). In Maine, several peaks exceed 4,000 ft (1,200 m), including Mount Katahdin at 5,267 feet (1,605 m). In New Hampshire, many summits rise above 5,000 ft (1,500 m), including Mount Washington in the White Mountains at 6,288 ft (1,917 m), Adams at 5,771 ft (1,759 m), Jefferson at 5,712 ft (1,741 m), Monroe at 5,380 ft (1,640 m), Madison at 5,367 ft (1,636 m), Lafayette at 5,249 feet (1,600 m), and Lincoln at 5,089 ft (1,551 m). In the Green Mountains the highest point, Mt. Mansfield, is 4,393 ft (1,339 m) in elevation; others include Killington Peak at 4,226 ft (1,288 m), Camel's Hump at 4,083 ft (1,244 m), Mt. Abraham at 4,006 ft (1,221 m), and a number of other heights exceeding 3,000 ft (900 m).

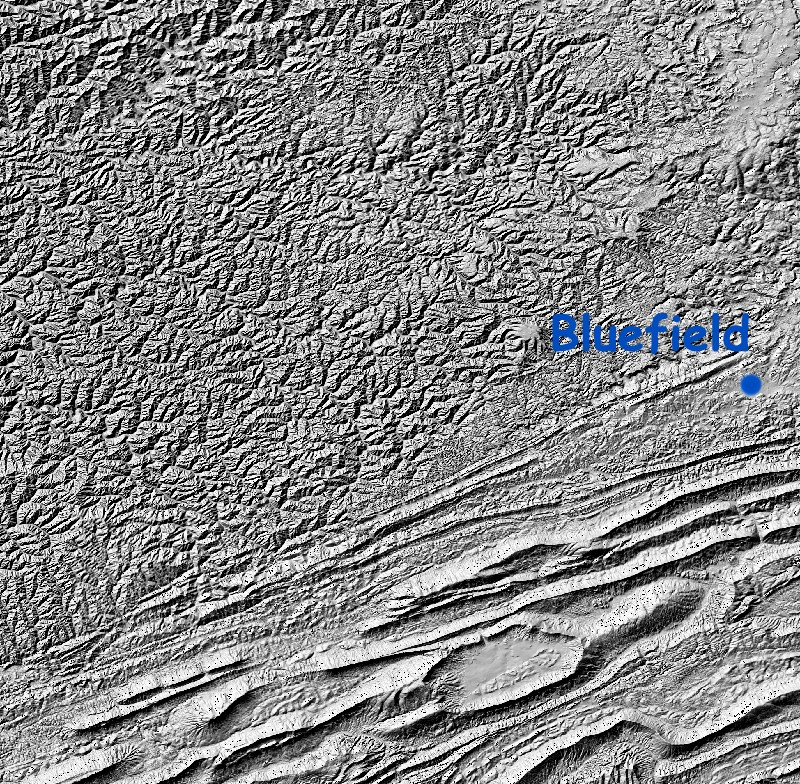
A shaded map of the Cumberland Plateau and Ridge-and-Valley Appalachians on the Virginia–West Virginia border

- Central: The central section runs from the Hudson Valley in New York to the New River through the Lehigh Valley and central Pennsylvania and western Maryland to western Virginia and West Virginia. The central region comprises the Valley Ridges between the Allegheny Front of the Allegheny Plateau and the Great Appalachian Valley, the New York–New Jersey Highlands, the Taconic Mountains in New York, and a large portion of the Blue Ridge. In addition to the true folded mountains, known as the ridge and valley province, the area of dissected plateau to the north and west of the mountains is usually grouped with the Appalachians. This includes the Catskill Mountains of Lower New York, the Poconos in Pennsylvania, and the Allegheny Plateau of New York's Southern Tier region, western Pennsylvania, eastern Ohio and northern West Virginia.

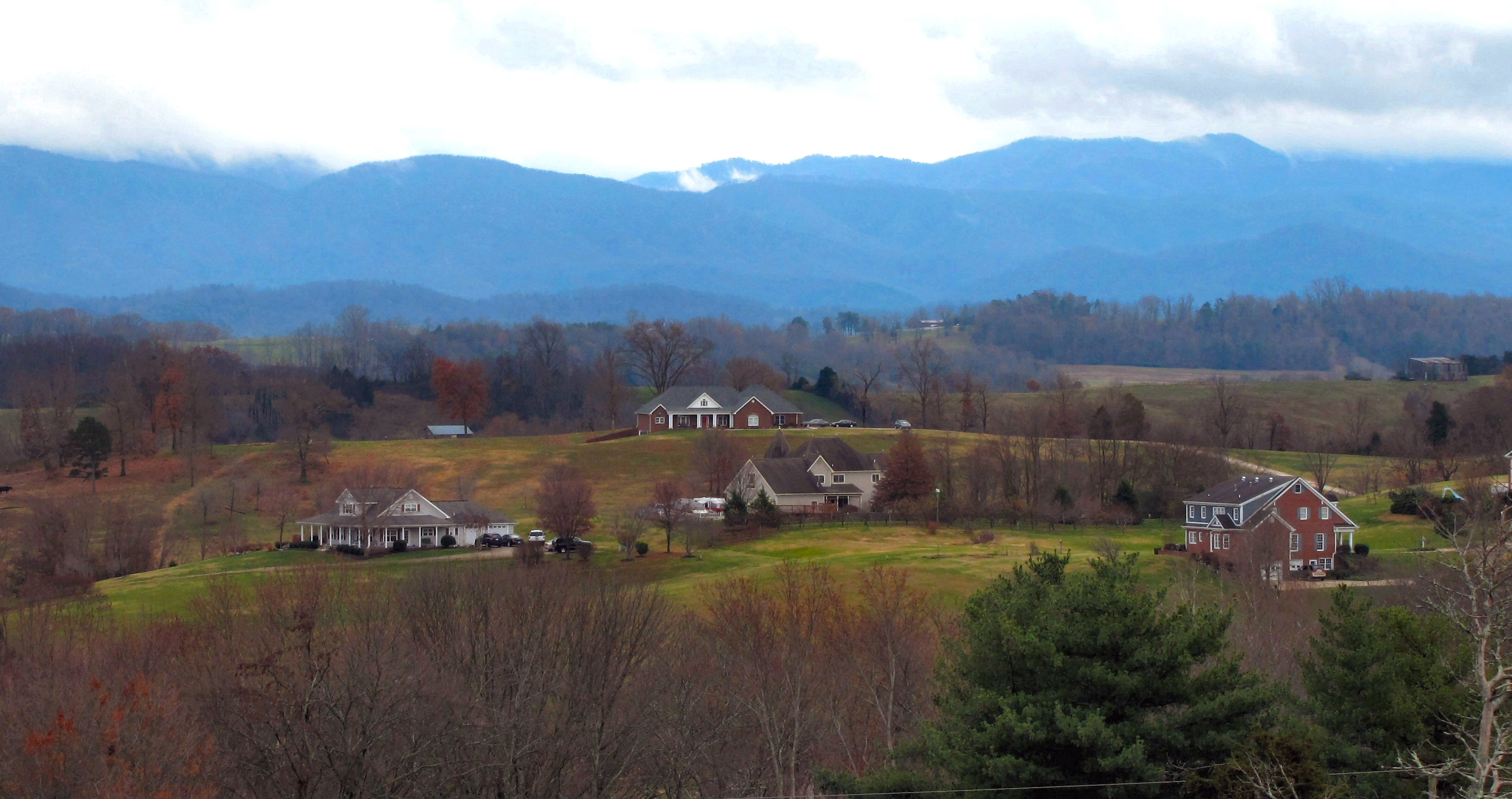
Bald Mountains in Tennessee

- Southern: The southern section runs from the New River and consists of the prolongation of the Blue Ridge Mountains, which is divided into the Western Blue Ridge (or Unaka) Front and the Eastern Blue Ridge Front, the Ridge-and-Valley Appalachians, and the Cumberland Plateau. This same plateau is known as the Cumberland Plateau in southern West Virginia, eastern Kentucky, far Southwest Virginia, eastern Tennessee, and northern Alabama.

== Geology ==
Plate tectonics over the period dating back at least 1 billion years led to geological creation of the land that is now the Appalachian Mountain range. The continental movement led to collisions that built mountains and they later pulled apart creating oceans over parts of the continent that are now exposed.

=== Grenville orogeny and formation of Supercontinent Rodinia ===
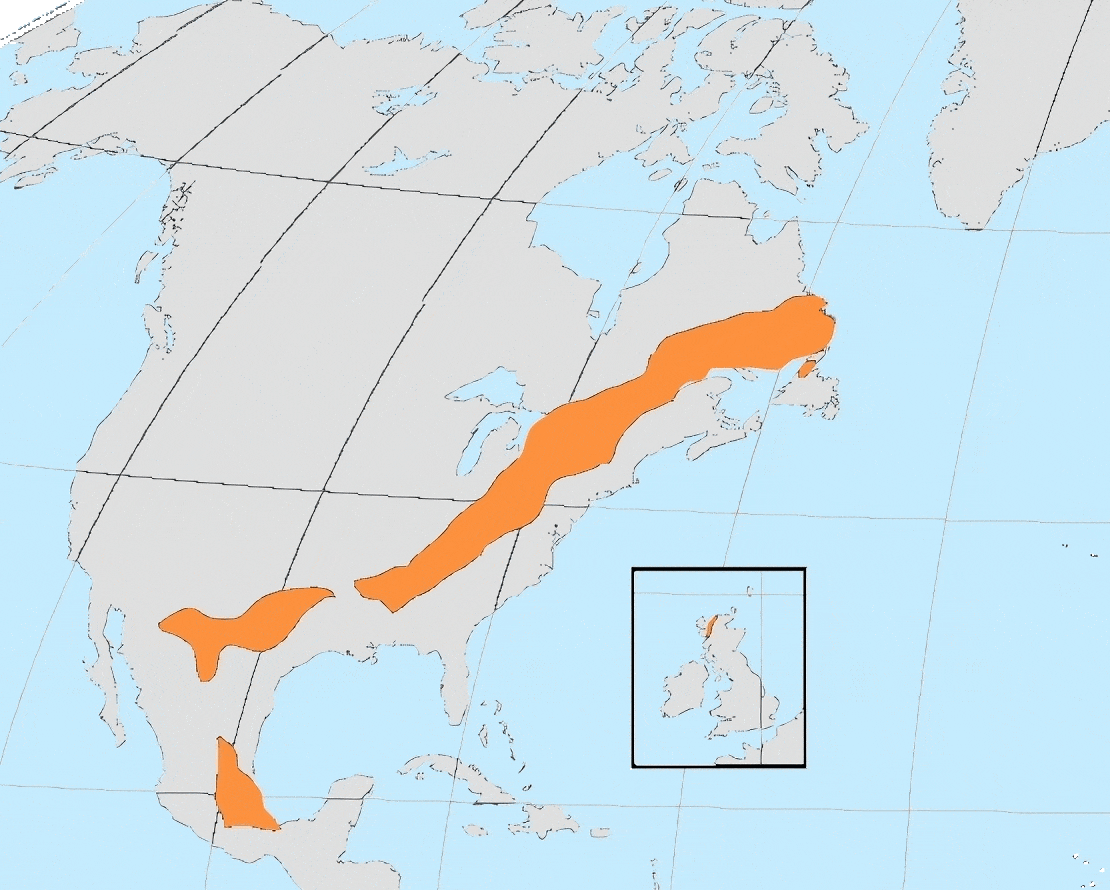
Land added to Laurentia during the Grenville orogeny

The first mountain-building tectonic plate collision that initiated the construction of what are today the Appalachians occurred at least a billion years ago when the pre-North American craton called Laurentia collided with at least one other craton — Amazonia. All the other cratons of the earth also collided at about this time to form the supercontinent Rodinia and were surrounded by one single ocean. (It is possible that the cratons of Kalahari, and Rio Plato, were also part of that early collision since they were present as Rodinia broke up). Mountain-building referred to as the Grenville Orogeny occurred along the boundaries of the cratons. The present Appalachian Mountains have at least two areas which are made from rock formations that were formed during this orogeny - the Blue Ridge Mountains and the Adirondacks.

=== Breakup of Rodinia and formation of the Iapetus Ocean ===
After the Grenville orogeny, the direction of the continental drift reversed, and the single supercontinent Rodinia began to break up. The mountains formed during the Grenvillian era underwent erosion due to weathering, glaciation, and other natural processes, resulting in the leveling of the landscape. The eroded sediments from these mountains contributed to the formation of sedimentary basins and valleys. For example, in what is now the southern United States, the Ococee Basin was formed. Seawater filled the basin. Rivers from the surrounding countryside carried clay, silt, sand, and gravel to the basin, much as rivers today carry sediment from the midcontinent region to the Gulf of Mexico. The sediment spread out in layers on the basin floor. The basin continued to subside, and over a long period of time, probably millions of years, a great thickness of sediment accumulated. Eventually, the tectonic forces pulling the two continents apart became so strong that an ocean formed off the eastern coast of the Laurentian margin. This was called the Iapetus Ocean and was the precursor of the modern Atlantic Ocean. The rocks of the Valley and Ridge province formed over millions of years, in the Iapetus. Shells and other hard parts of ancient marine plants and animals accumulated to form limey deposits that later became limestone. This is the same process by which limestone forms in modern oceans. The weathering of limestone, now exposed at the land surface, produces the lime-rich soils that are so prevalent in the fertile farmland of the Valley and Ridge province.

During this continental break-up, around 600 million to 560 million years ago, volcanic activity was present along the tectonic margins. There is evidence of this activity in today's Blue Ridge Mountains. Mount Rogers, Whitetop Mountain, and Pine Mountain are all the result of volcanic activity that occurred around this time. Evidence of subsurface activity, dikes and sills intruding into the overlying rock, is present in the Blue Ridge as well. For instance, mafic rocks have been found along the Fries Fault in the central Blue Ridge area of Montgomery County, Virginia. One of the best examples of mafic rocks from the breakup of Rodinia is the Catoctin Formation. Erupted during the final stages of rifting associated with Rodinia (570–550 Ma), these rocks where later metamorphosed into Greenstone.

=== Taconic Orogeny ===
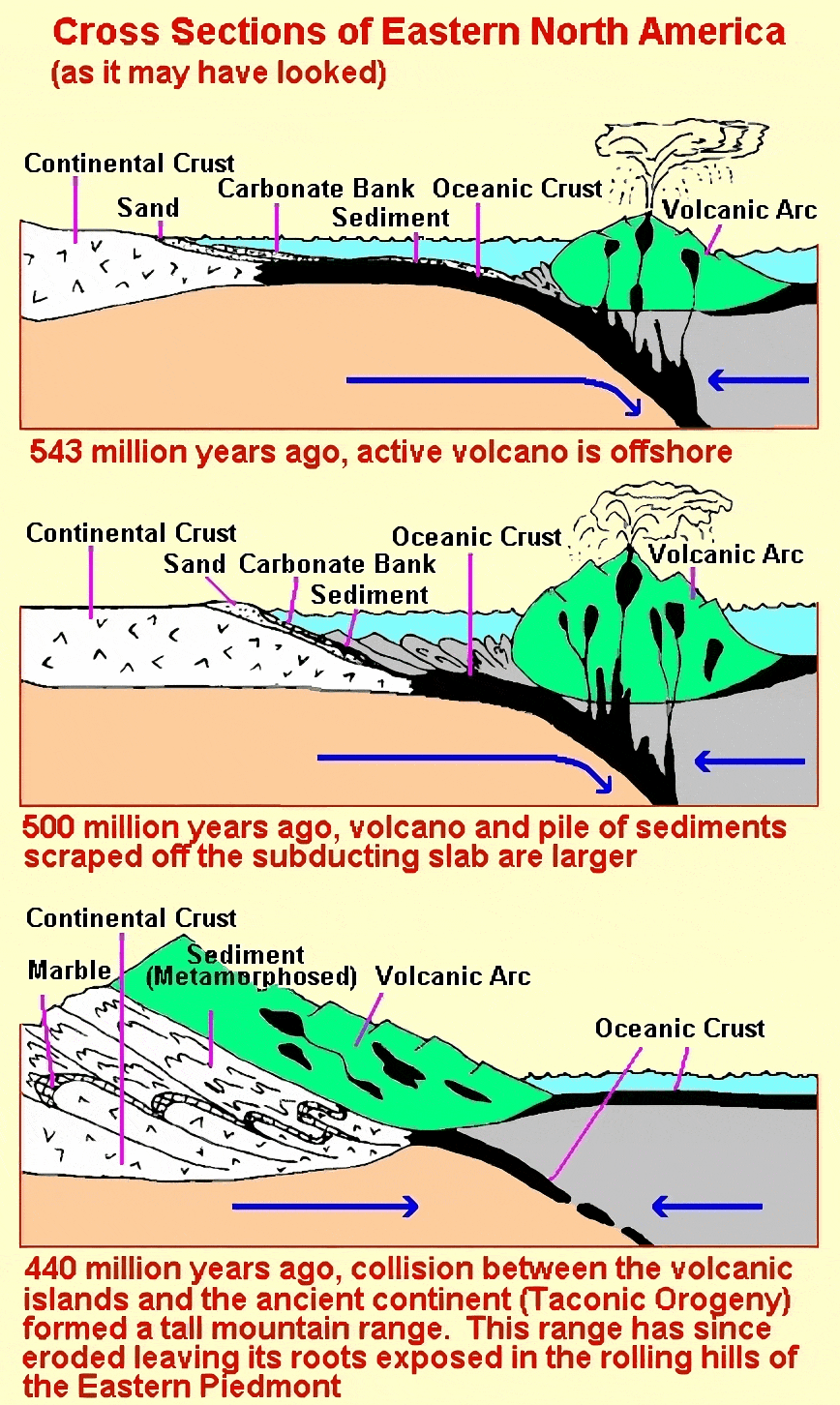
Taconic orogeny

The Iapetus continued to expand and during that time bacteria, algae, and many species of invertebrates flourished in the oceans, but there were no plants or animals on land. Then, during the middle Ordovician Period about 500 to 470 million years ago, the motion of the crustal plates changed, and the continents began to move back toward each other. The once-quiet Appalachian passive margin changed to a very active plate boundary when a neighboring Iapetus oceanic plate containing a volcanic arc collided with and began sinking beneath the North American craton. Volcanoes grew along the continental margin coincident with the initiation of subduction. Thrust faulting uplifted and warped older sedimentary rock laid down on the passive margin. As the mountains rose, erosion began to wear them down over time. Streams carried rock debris downslope to be deposited in nearby lowlands. The Taconic orogeny ended after about 60 million years, but built much of the land mass that is now New England and southwestward to Pennsylvania.

The Taconic Orogeny was the second of four mountain building plate collisions that contributed to the formation of the Appalachians, culminating in the collision of North America and Africa (see Alleghanian orogeny).

=== Acadian orogeny ===
The third mountain-building event was the Acadian orogeny which occurred between 375 and 359 million years ago. The Acadian orogeny was caused by a series of collisions of pieces of crust from the Avalonia Terrane, sections broken off from continent of Gondwana, with the North American Plate. The collision initiating this orogeny resulted in the closing of the southern Iapetus Ocean and the formation of a high mountain belt. After the Acadian collision took place, Gondwana began to retreat from Laurentia with the newly accreted Avalonian terranes left behind. As Gondwana moved away, a new ocean opened up, the Rheic Ocean, during the Middle to Late Devonian, and subsequently its closure would result in the formation of the Alleghanian orogeny.

=== Alleghenian orogeny and Supercontinent Pangea ===
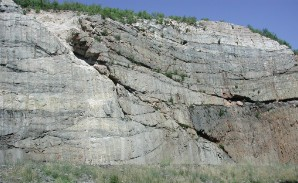
Old fault exposed by roadcut near Hazleton, Pennsylvania, along Interstate 81 in Northeastern Pennsylvania

As the continental plates moved closer together, fragments of oceanic crust, islands, and other continental masses collided with the eastern margin of ancestral North America. By this time, plants had appeared on land, followed by scorpions, insects, and amphibians. The ocean continued to shrink until, about 270 million years ago, the continents that were ancestral to North America and Africa collided during the formation of the supercontinent Pangea.

Because North America and Africa were once geographically connected, the Appalachians formed part of the same mountain chain as the Little Atlas in Morocco. This mountain range, known as the Central Pangean Mountains, extended into Scotland, before the Mesozoic Era opening of the Iapetus Ocean, from the North America/Europe collision (See Caledonian orogeny).

By the end of the Mesozoic Era, the Appalachian Mountains had been eroded to an almost flat plain. It was not until the region was uplifted during the Cenozoic Era that the distinctive topography of the present formed. Uplift rejuvenated the streams, which rapidly responded by cutting downward into the ancient bedrock. Some streams flowed along weak layers that define the folds and faults created many millions of years earlier. Other streams downcut so rapidly that they cut right across the resistant folded rocks of the mountain core, carving canyons across rock layers and geologic structures.

=== Mineral resources ===
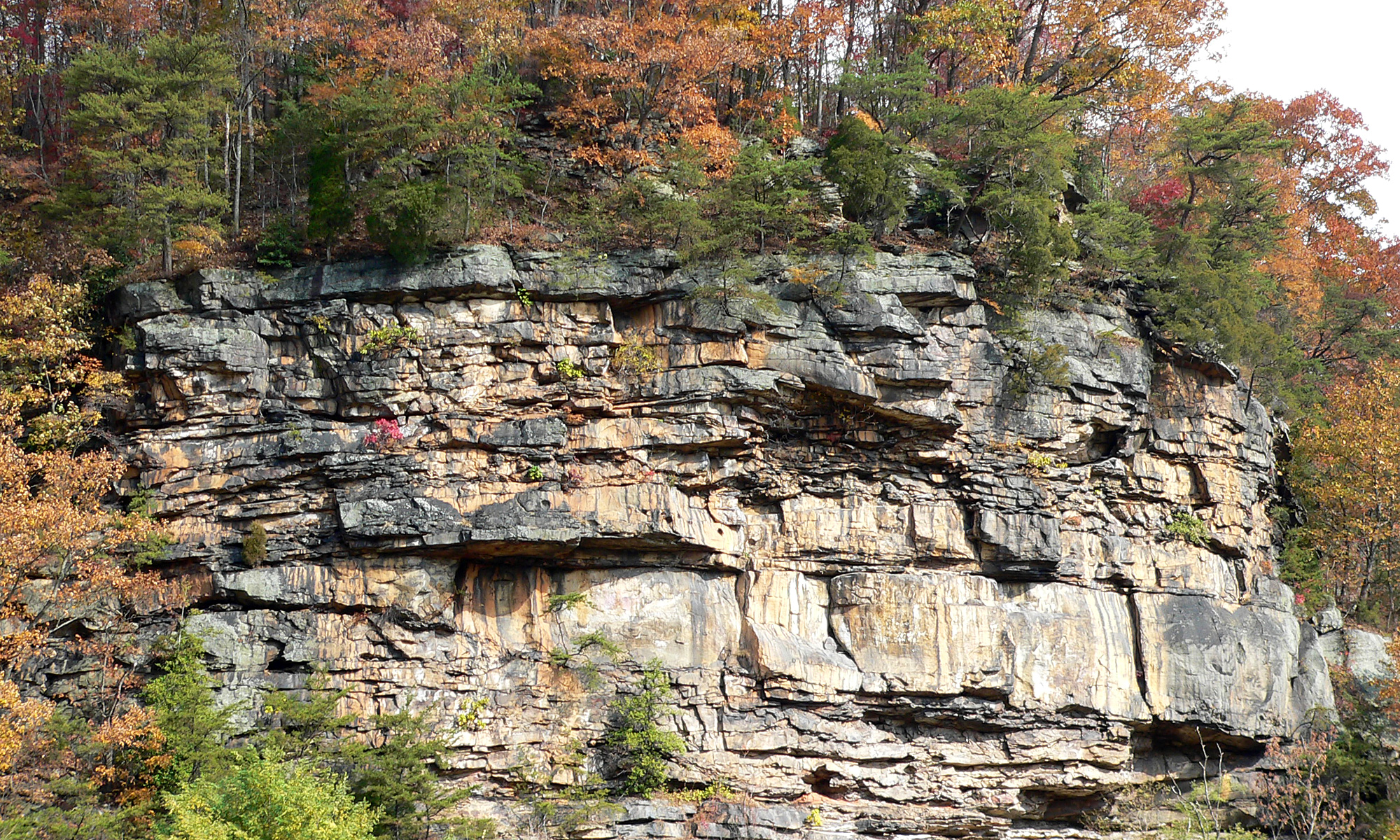
Cliffs overlooking the New River near Gauley Bridge, West Virginia

The Appalachian Mountains contain major deposits of anthracite coal as well as bituminous coal. In the folded mountains the coal is in metamorphosed form as anthracite, represented by the Coal Region of northeastern Pennsylvania. The bituminous coal fields of western Pennsylvania, western Maryland, southeastern Ohio, eastern Kentucky, southwestern Virginia, and West Virginia contain the sedimentary form of coal. The mountain top removal method of coal mining, in which entire mountain tops are removed, is currently threatening vast areas and ecosystems of the Appalachian Mountain region. The surface coal mining that started in the 1940s has significantly impacted the central Appalachian Mountains in Kentucky, Tennessee, Virginia and West Virginia. Early mining methods were unregulated and mined land reclamation research, including acid base accounting, was led by the West Virginia University in the 1960s and 1970s. West Virginia developed rigorous mine reclamation standards for state coal mines in the late 1960s. Regulations were introduced by most states to protect the Appalachian Mountains by the late 1960s. Social and political activism brought about the Surface Mining Control and Reclamation Act of 1977.

The 1859 discovery of commercial quantities of petroleum in the Appalachian Mountains of western Pennsylvania started the modern United States petroleum industry. Recent discoveries of commercial natural gas deposits in the Marcellus Shale formation and Utica Shale formations have once again focused oil industry attention on the Appalachian Basin.

Some plateaus of the Appalachian Mountains contain metallic minerals such as iron and zinc.

=== Drainage ===
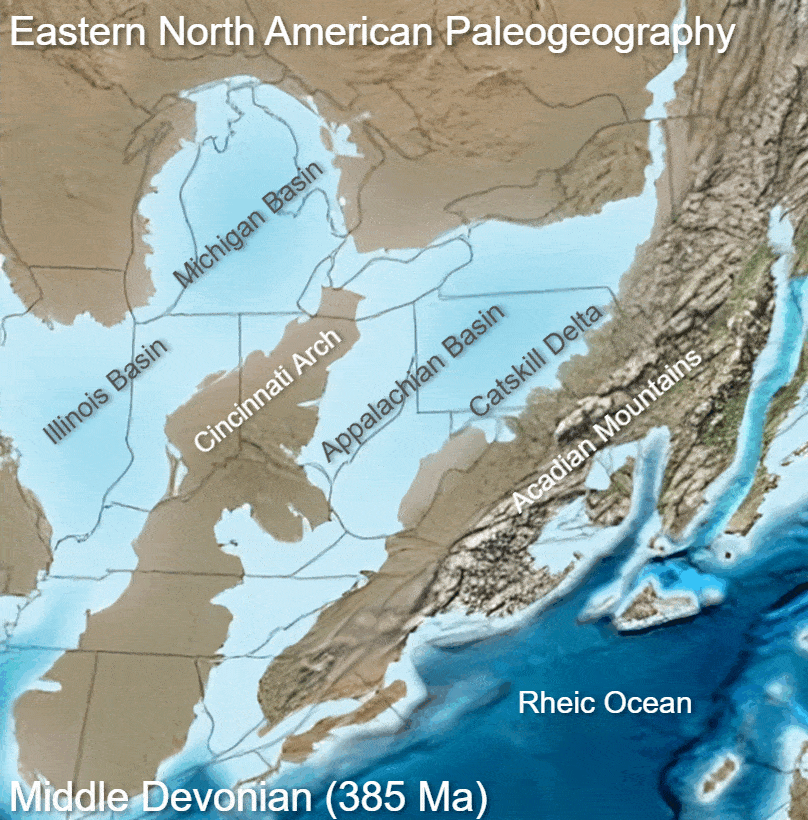
Paleogeographic reconstruction showing the Appalachian Basin area during the Middle Devonian period

There are many geological issues concerning the rivers and streams of the Appalachians. In spite of the existence of the Great Appalachian Valley, many of the main rivers are transverse to the mountain system axis. The drainage divide of the Appalachians follows a tortuous course that crosses the mountainous belt just north of the New River in Virginia. South of the New River, rivers head into the Blue Ridge, cross the higher Unakas, receive important tributaries from the Great Valley, and traversing the Cumberland Plateau in spreading gorges (water gaps), escape by way of the Cumberland River and the Tennessee River rivers to the Ohio River and the Mississippi River, and thence to the Gulf of Mexico. In the central section, north of the New River, the rivers, rising in or just beyond the Valley Ridges, flow through great gorges to the Great Valley, and then across the Blue Ridge to tidal estuaries penetrating the coastal plain via the Roanoke River, James River, Potomac River, and Susquehanna River.

In the northern section, the height of land lies on the inland side of the mountainous belt, and thus the main lines of drainage run from north to south, exemplified by the Hudson River. However, the valley through which the Hudson River flows was cut by the gigantic glaciers of the ice ages—the same glaciers that deposited their terminal moraines in southern New York and formed the east–west Long Island.

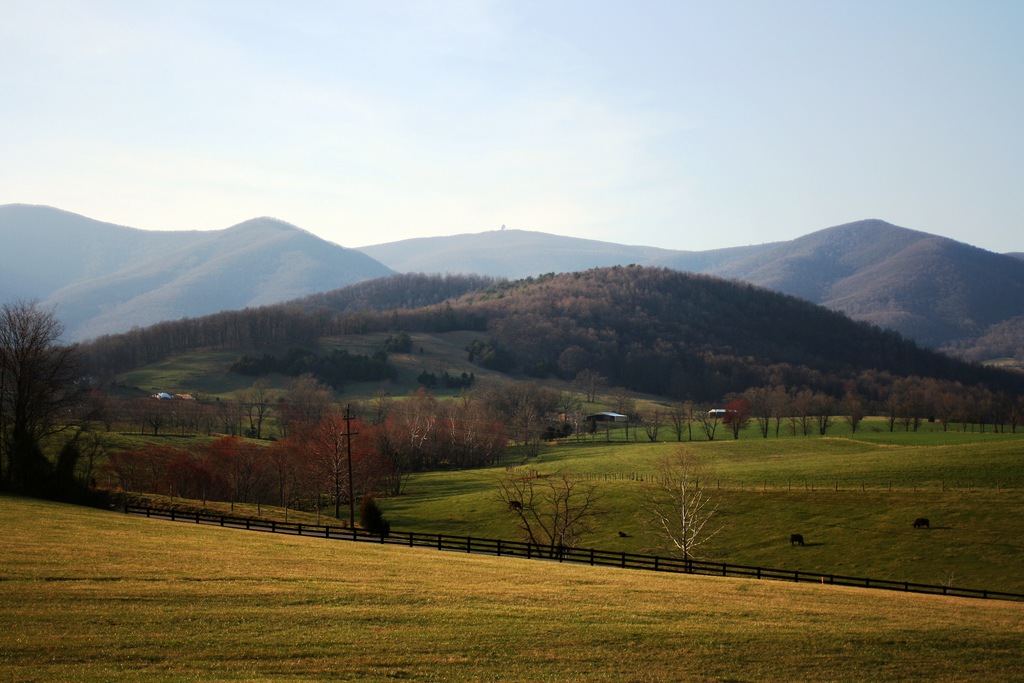
Apple Orchard Mountain peak in the Blue Ridge Mountains, which stretch from southern Pennsylvania in the north through Georgia in the south

The Appalachian region is generally considered the geographical divide between the eastern seaboard of the United States and the Midwest region of the country. The Eastern Continental Divide follows the Appalachian Mountains from Pennsylvania to Georgia.

== Ecology ==
The Appalachians, particularly the Central and Southern regions, is one of the most biodiverse places in North America. The north–south orientation of the long ridges and valleys contributes to the high number of plant and animal species. Species were able to migrate through these from either direction during alternating periods of warming and cooling, settling in the microclimates that best suited them.

=== Flora ===
The flora of the Appalachians are diverse and vary primarily in response to geology, latitude, elevation and moisture availability. Geobotanically, they constitute a floristic province of the North American Atlantic Region. The Appalachians consist primarily of deciduous broad-leaf trees and evergreen needle-leaf conifers, but also contain the evergreen broad-leaf American holly (Ilex opaca), and the deciduous needle-leaf conifer, the tamarack, or eastern larch (Larix laricina).

The dominant northern and high elevation conifer is the red spruce (Picea rubens), which grows from near sea level to above 4,000 ft (1,200 m) above sea level (asl) in northern New England and southeastern Canada. It also grows southward along the Appalachian crest to the highest elevations of the southern Appalachians, as in North Carolina and Tennessee. In the central Appalachians it is usually confined above 3,000 ft (900 m) asl, except for a few cold valleys in which it reaches lower elevations. In the southern Appalachians, it is restricted to higher elevations. Another species is the black spruce (Picea mariana), which extends farthest north of any conifer in North America, is found at high elevations in the northern Appalachians, and in bogs as far south as Pennsylvania.

The Appalachians are also home to two species of fir, the boreal balsam fir (Abies balsamea), and the southern high elevation endemic, Fraser fir (Abies fraseri). Fraser fir is endemic to the highest parts of the southern Appalachian Mountains, where along with red spruce it forms a fragile ecosystem known as the Southern Appalachian spruce–fir forest. Fraser fir rarely occurs below 5,500 ft (1,700 m), and becomes the dominant tree type at 6,200 ft (1,900 m). By contrast, balsam fir is found from near sea level to the tree line in the northern Appalachians, but ranges only as far south as Virginia and West Virginia in the central Appalachians, where it is usually confined above 3,900 ft (1,200 m) asl, except in cold valleys. Curiously, it is associated with oaks in Virginia. The balsam fir of Virginia and West Virginia is thought by some to be a natural hybrid between the more northern variety and Fraser fir. While red spruce is common in both upland and bog habitats, balsam fir, as well as black spruce and tamarack, are more characteristic of the latter. However, balsam fir also does well in soils with a pH as high as 6.

Eastern or Canada hemlock (Tsuga canadensis) is another important evergreen needle-leaf conifer that grows along the Appalachian chain from north to south but is confined to lower elevations than red spruce and the firs. It generally occupies richer and less acidic soils than the spruce and firs and is characteristic of deep, shaded and moist mountain valleys and coves. It is subject to the hemlock woolly adelgid (Adelges tsugae), an introduced insect, that is rapidly extirpating it as a forest tree. Less abundant, and restricted to the southern Appalachians, is Carolina hemlock (Tsuga caroliniana). Like Canada hemlock, this tree suffers severely from the hemlock woolly adelgid.

Several species of pines characteristic of the Appalachians are eastern white pine (Pinus strobus ), Virginia pine (Pinus virginiana), pitch pine (Pinus rigida ), Table Mountain pine (Pinus pungens) and shortleaf pine (Pinus echinata). Red pine (Pinus resinosa) is a boreal species that forms a few high elevation outliers as far south as West Virginia. All of these species except white pine tend to occupy sandy, rocky, poor soil sites, which are mostly acidic in character. White pine, a large species valued for its timber, tends to do best in rich, moist soil, either acidic or alkaline in character. Pitch pine is also at home in acidic, boggy soil, and Table Mountain pine may occasionally be found in this habitat as well. Shortleaf pine is generally found in warmer habitats and at lower elevations than the other species. All the species listed do best in open or lightly shaded habitats, although white pine also thrives in shady coves, valleys, and on floodplains.

The Appalachians are characterized by a wealth of large, beautiful deciduous broadleaf (hardwood) trees. Their occurrences are best summarized and described in E. Lucy Braun's 1950 classic, Deciduous Forests of Eastern North America (Macmillan, New York). The most diverse and richest forests are the mixed-mesophytic or medium-moisture types, which are largely confined to rich, moist montane soils of the southern and central Appalachians, particularly in the Cumberland and Allegheny Mountains, but also thrive in the southern Appalachian coves. Characteristic canopy species are white basswood (Tilia heterophylla), yellow buckeye (Aesculus octandra), sugar maple (Acer saccharum), American beech (Fagus grandifolia), tuliptree (Liriodendron tulipifera), white ash (Fraxinus americana) and yellow birch (Betula alleganiensis). Other common trees are red maple (Acer rubrum), shagbark and bitternut hickories (Carya ovata and C. cordiformis) and black or sweet birch (Betula lenta ). Small understory trees and shrubs include paw paw (Asimina tribola), flowering dogwood (Cornus florida), hophornbeam (Ostrya virginiana), witch-hazel (Hamamelis virginiana) and spicebush (Lindera benzoin). There are also hundreds of perennial and annual herbs, among them such herbal and medicinal plants as American ginseng (Panax quinquefolius), goldenseal (Hydrastis canadensis), bloodroot (Sanguinaria canadensis) and black cohosh (Cimicifuga racemosa).

The foregoing trees, shrubs, and herbs are also more widely distributed in less rich mesic forests that generally occupy coves, stream valleys and flood plains throughout the southern and central Appalachians at low and intermediate elevations. In the northern Appalachians and at higher elevations of the central and southern Appalachians these diverse mesic forests give way to less diverse northern hardwood forests with canopies dominated only by American beech, sugar maple, American basswood (Tilia americana) and yellow birch and with far fewer species of shrubs and herbs.

Drier and rockier uplands and ridges are occupied by oak–chestnut forests dominated by a variety of oaks (Quercus spp.), hickories (Carya spp.) and, in the past, by the American chestnut (Castanea dentata). The American chestnut was virtually eliminated as a canopy species by the introduced fungal chestnut blight (Cryphonectaria parasitica), but lives on as sapling-sized sprouts that originate from roots, which are not killed by the fungus. In present-day forest canopies, chestnut has been largely replaced by oaks.

The oak forests of the southern and central Appalachians consist largely of black, northern red, white, chestnut and scarlet oaks (Quercus velutina, Q. rubra, Q. alba, Q. prinus and Q. coccinea) and hickories, such as the pignut (Carya glabra) in particular. The richest forests, which grade into mesic types, usually in coves and on gentle slopes, have predominantly white and northern red oaks, while the driest sites are dominated by chestnut oak, or sometimes by scarlet or northern red oaks. In the northern Appalachians the oaks, except for white and northern red, drop out, while the latter extends farthest north.

The oak forests generally lack the diverse small tree, shrub and herb layers of mesic forests. Shrubs are generally ericaceous, and include the evergreen mountain laurel (Kalmia latifolia), various species of blueberries (Vaccinium spp.), black huckleberry (Gaylussacia baccata), a number of deciduous rhododendrons (azaleas), and smaller heaths such as teaberry (Gaultheria procumbens) and trailing arbutus (Epigaea repens ). The evergreen great rhododendron (Rhododendron maximum) is characteristic of moist stream valleys. These occurrences are in line with the prevailing acidic character of most oak forest soils. In contrast, the much rarer chinquapin oak (Quercus muehlenbergii) demands alkaline soils and generally grows where limestone rock is near the surface. Hence no ericaceous shrubs are associated with it.

The Appalachian flora also include a diverse assemblage of bryophytes (mosses and liverworts), as well as fungi. Some species are rare and/or endemic. As with vascular plants, these tend to be closely related to the character of the soils and the thermal environment in which they are found.

Eastern deciduous forests are subject to a number of serious insect and disease outbreaks. Among the most conspicuous is that of the introduced spongy moth (Lymantria dispar), which infests primarily oaks, causing severe defoliation and tree mortality. But it also has the benefit of eliminating weak individuals, and thus improving the genetic stock, as well as creating rich habitat of a type through accumulation of dead wood. Because hardwoods sprout so readily, this moth is not as harmful as the hemlock woolly adelgid. Perhaps more serious is the introduced beech bark disease complex, which includes both a scale insect (Cryptococcus fagisuga) and fungal components.

During the 19th and early 20th centuries, the Appalachian forests were subject to severe and destructive logging and land clearing, which resulted in the designation of the national forests and parks as well many state-protected areas. However, these and a variety of other destructive activities continue, albeit in diminished forms; and thus far only a few ecologically based management practices have taken hold.

Appalachian bogs are boreal ecosystems, which occur in many places in the Appalachians, particularly the Allegheny and Blue Ridge subranges. Though popularly called bogs, many of them are technically fens.

Several mountain summits in the southern Appalachians are covered with expansive open habitats (either grassy meadows or heath) known as Appalachian balds. These habitats support many unique plant and animal communities, including rare, relict species, that are adapted to the open, exposed habitat. Their origins are heavily debated; while all were formerly thought to have anthropogenic origins, more recent evidence indicates a mixed origin: many were formed by climatic conditions in the Pleistocene and kept open by Pleistocene megafauna, then by other grazing wildlife (such as bison, elk, and deer) and Native American burning practices, and finally by grazing livestock introduced by European settlers. Others, especially those dominated by introduced grasses, may be fully anthropogenic in origin. The abandonment of grazing has caused trees to encroach on many of these balds, threatening their ecosystems.

In contrast to the largely grazing-influenced balds of the southern Appalachians, parts of the northern Appalachians such as the White Mountains. the Adirondack Mountains, and Mount Katahdin have summits covered with true alpine tundra; these ecosystems are kept clear due to extremely harsh winter storms, and support a vegetation community more akin to that of the Arctic Circle.

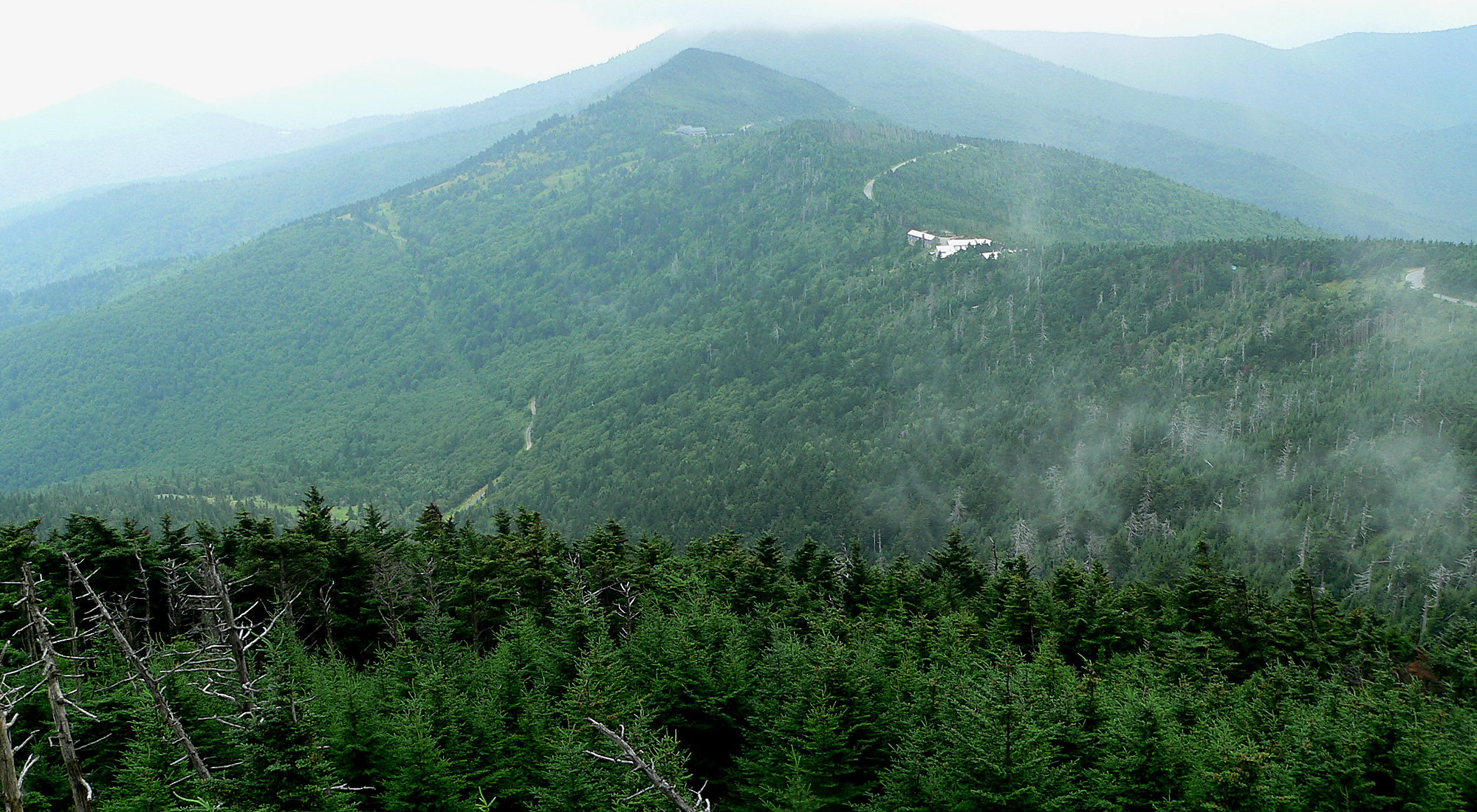
View from Mount Mitchell, North Carolina at 6,684 ft (2,037 m), the highest peak east of the Mississippi River

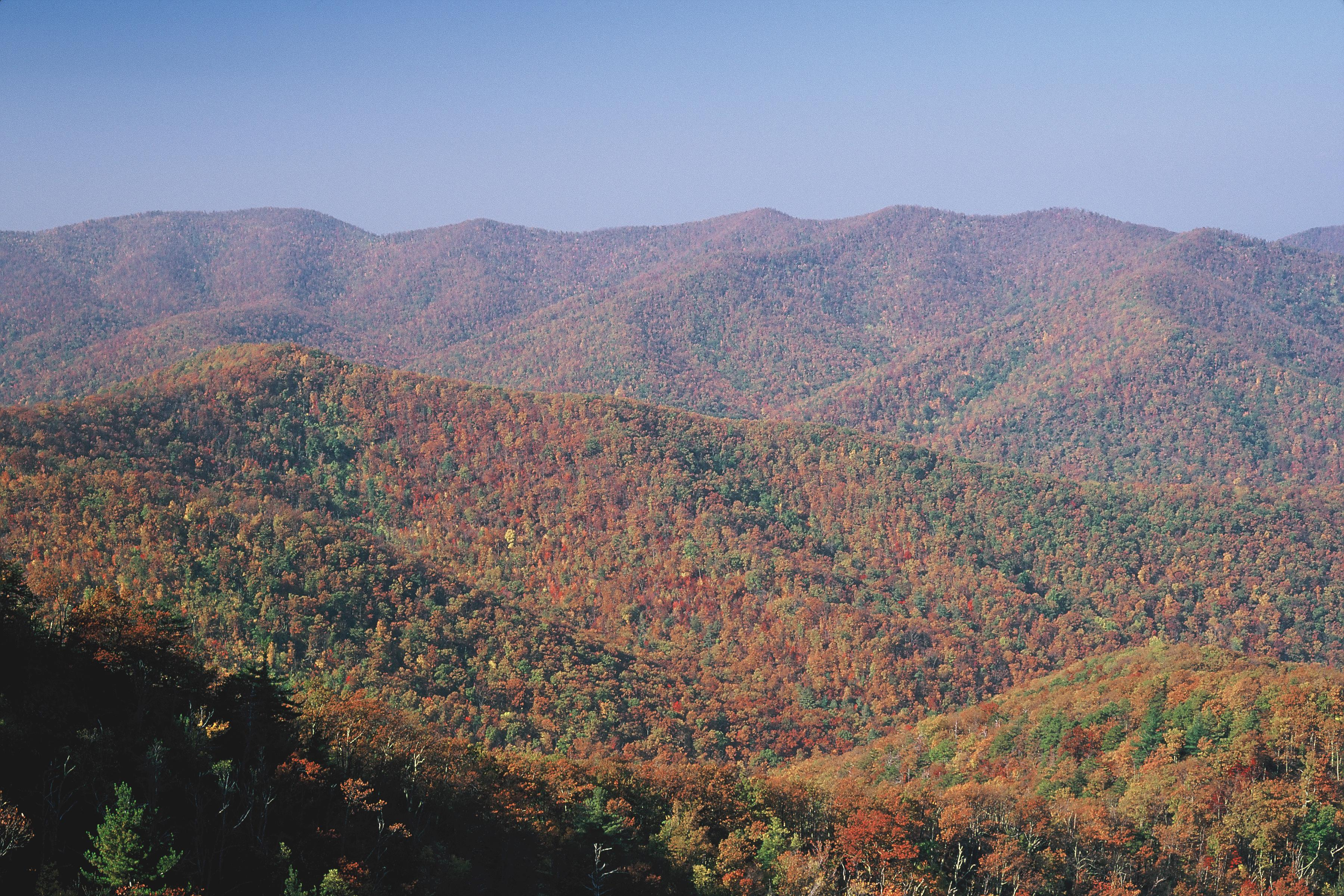
Shenandoah National Park in Virginia

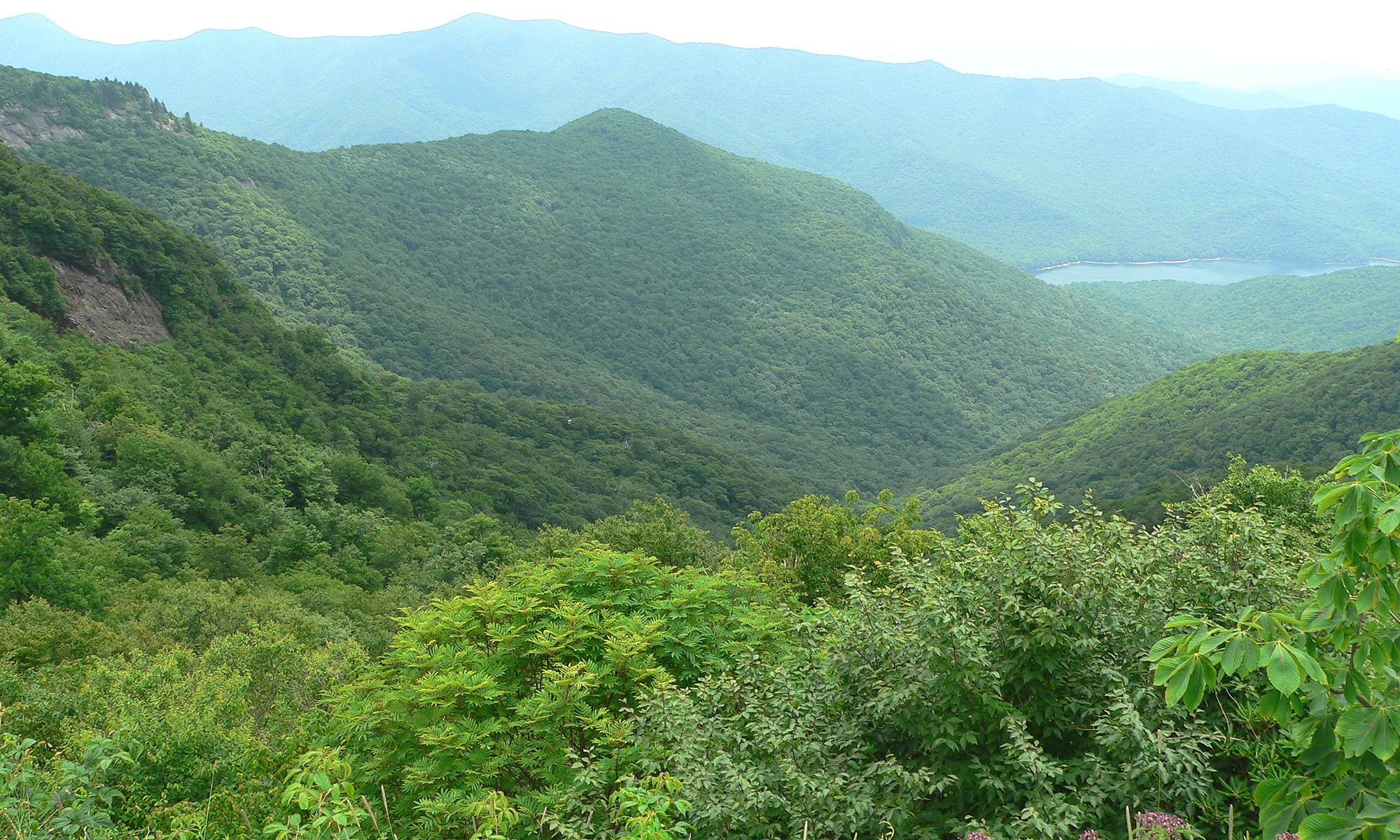
View from Craggy Gardens on the Blue Ridge Parkway in North Carolina

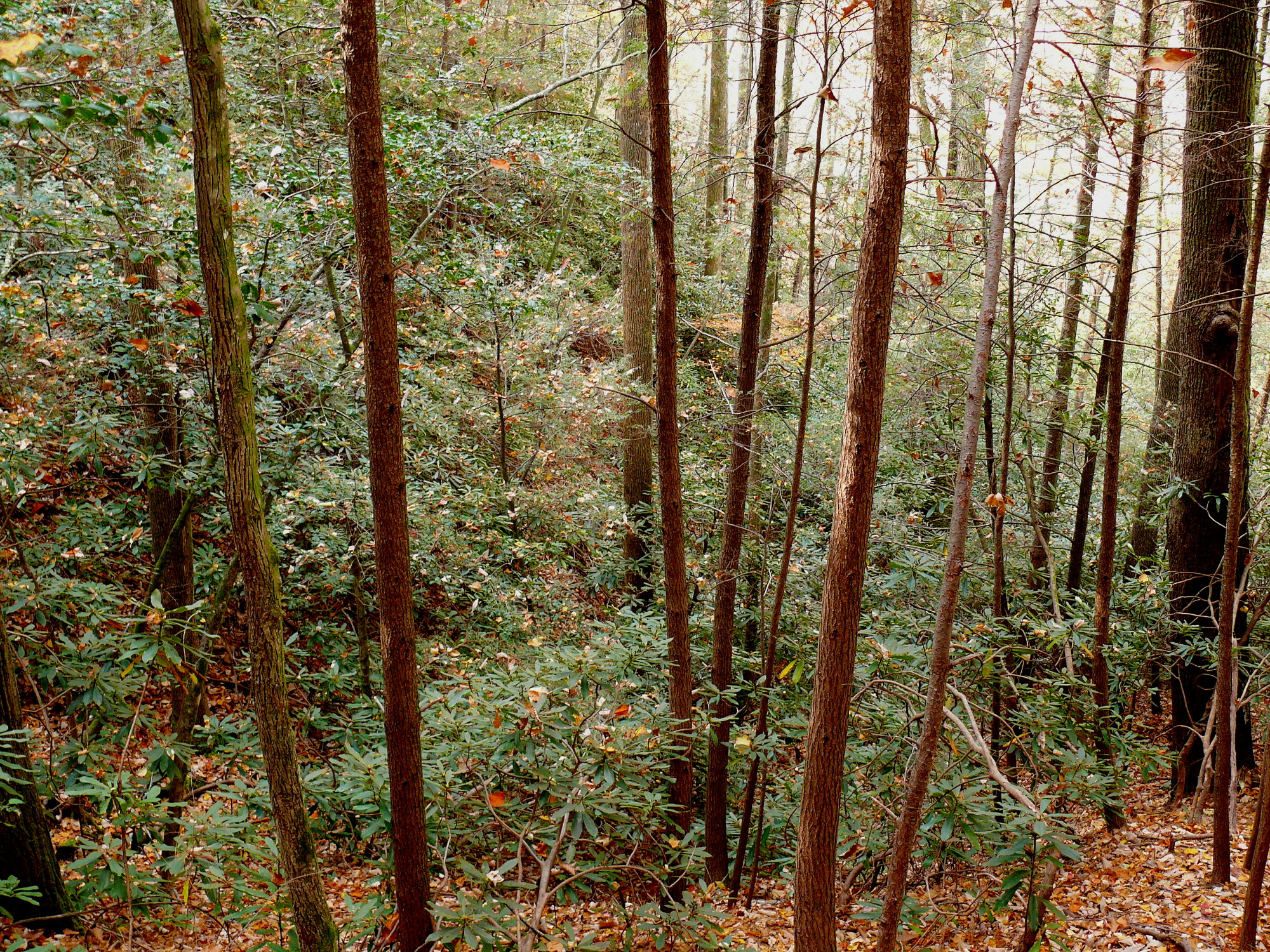
Great laurel thicket in the Pisgah National Forest in North Carolina

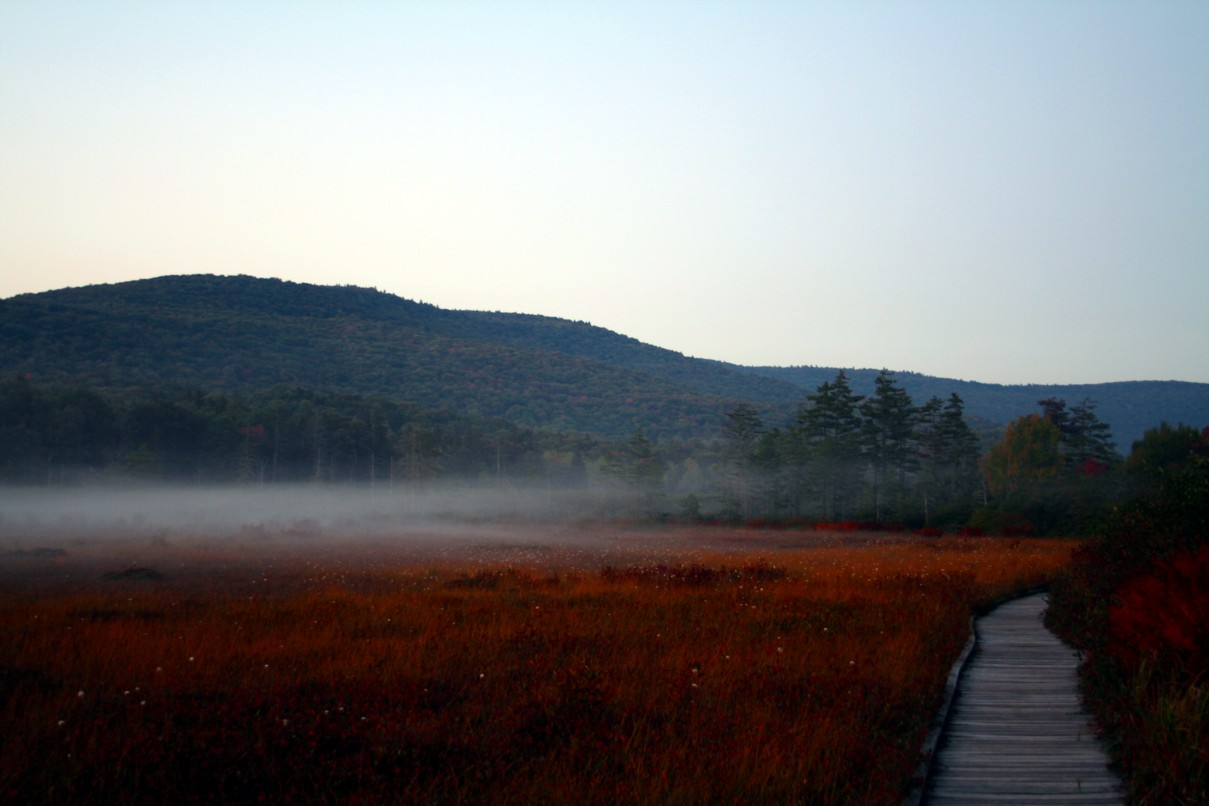
Cranberry Glades, a bog preserve in West Virginia

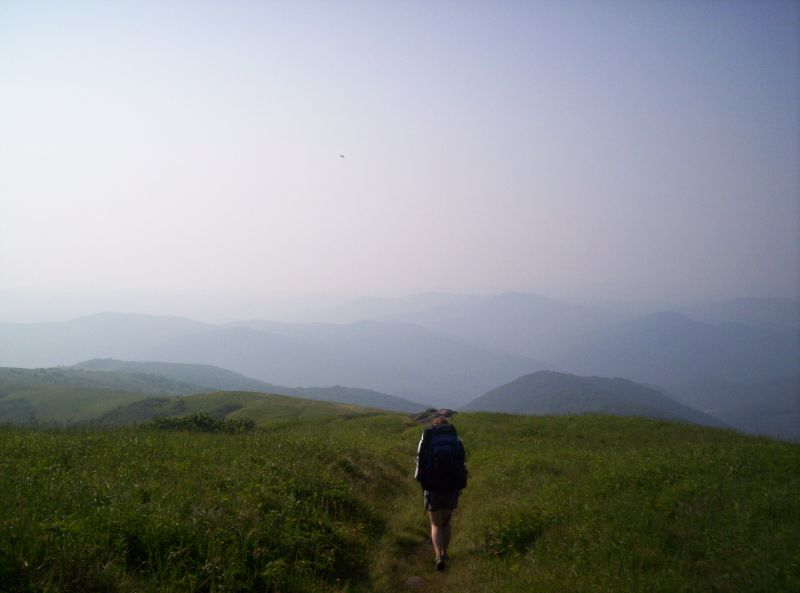
Grassy balds on the Roan Highlands straddling the North Carolina/Tennessee border

=== Fauna ===
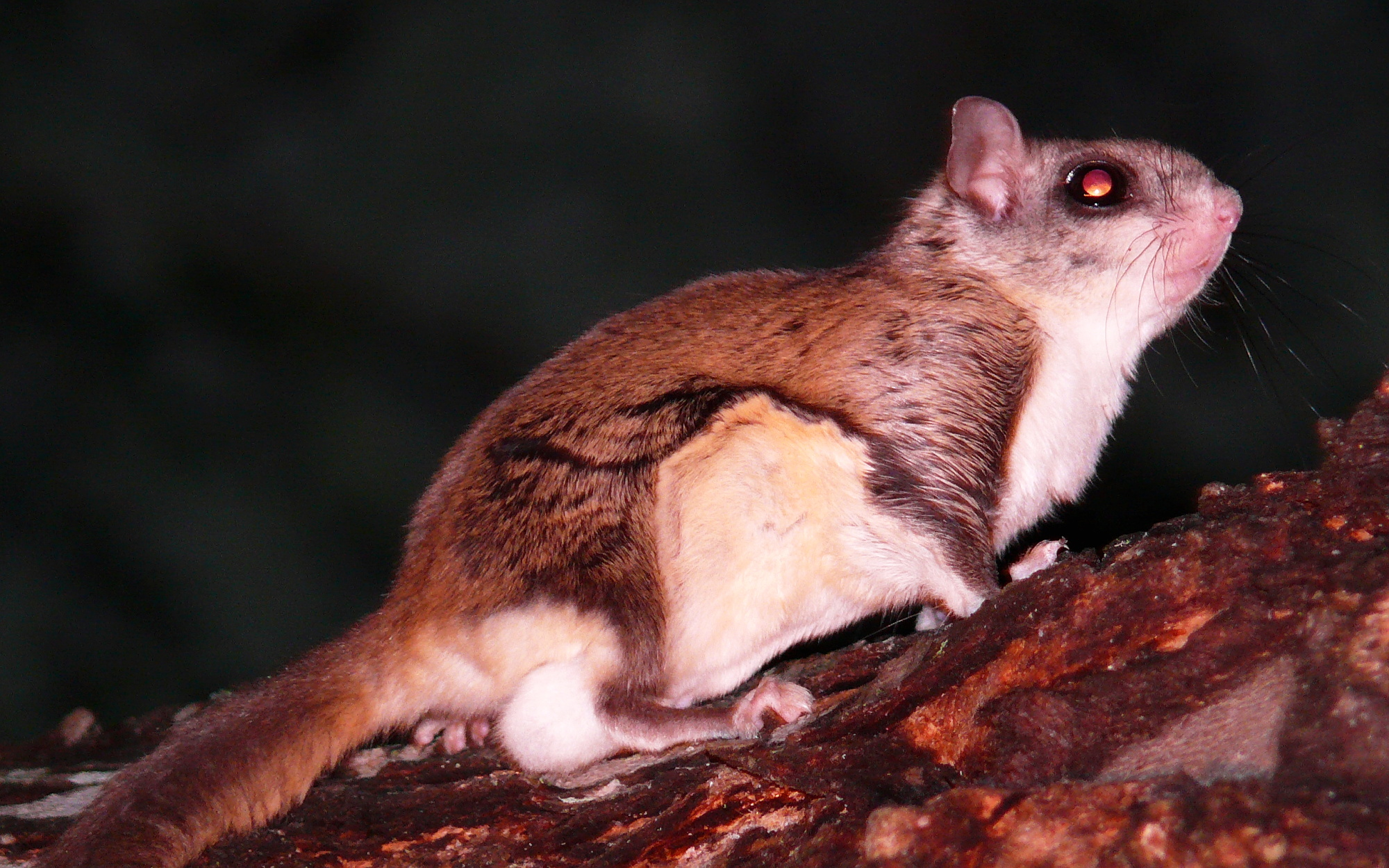
Southern flying squirrel

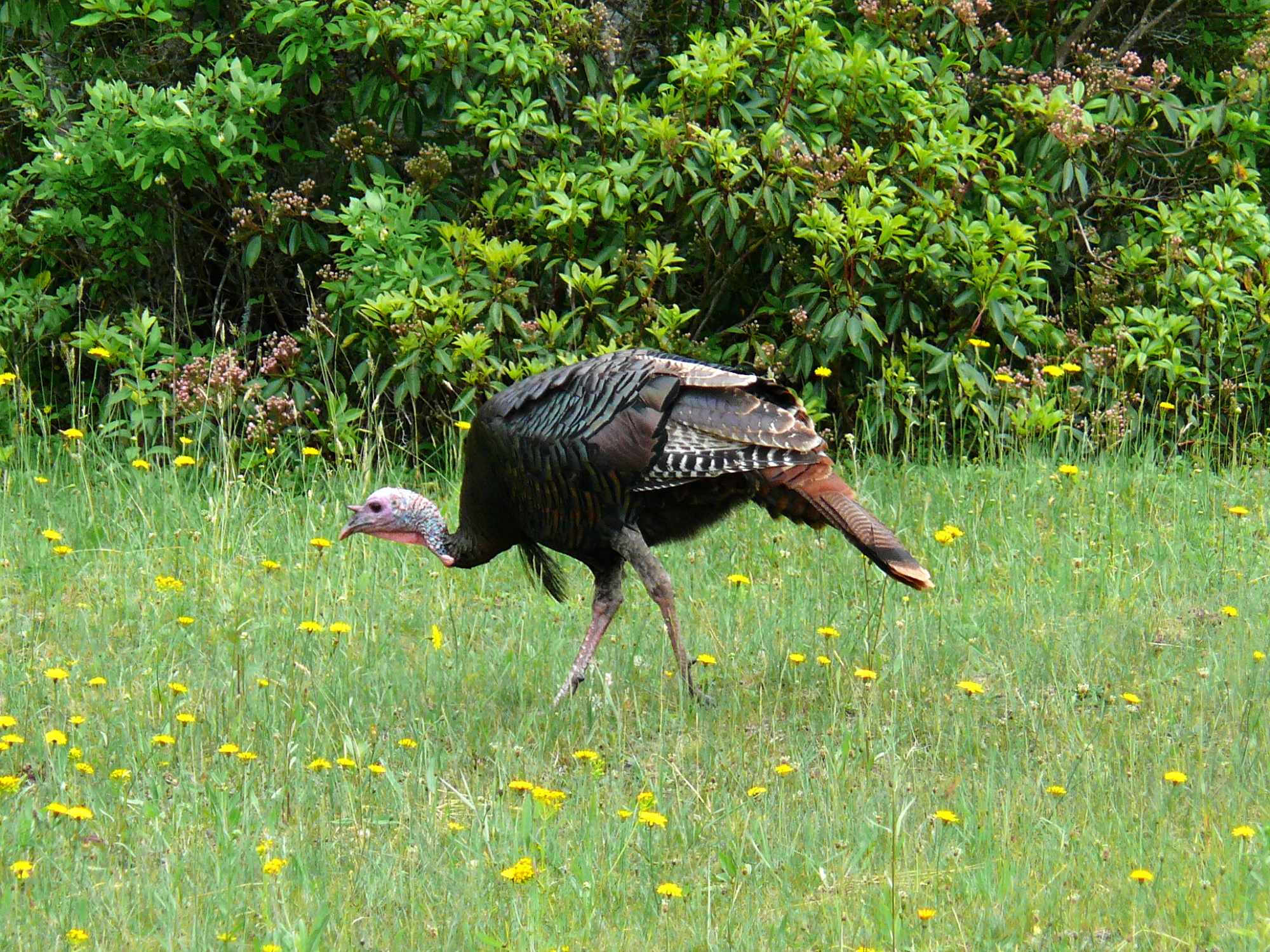
A male eastern wild turkey

Animals that characterize the Appalachian forests include five species of tree squirrels. The most commonly seen is the low to moderate elevation eastern gray squirrel (Sciurus carolinensis). Occupying similar habitat is the slightly larger fox squirrel (Sciurus niger) and the much smaller southern flying squirrel (Glaucomys volans). More characteristic of cooler northern and high elevation habitat is the red squirrel (Tamiasciurus hudsonicus), whereas the Appalachian northern flying squirrel (Glaucomys sabrinus fuscus), which closely resembles the southern flying squirrel, is confined to northern hardwood and spruce–fir forests.

As familiar as squirrels are the eastern cottontail rabbit (Silvilagus floridanus) and the white-tailed deer (Odocoileus virginianus). The latter in particular has greatly increased in abundance as a result of the extirpation of the eastern wolf (Canis lupus lycaon) and the North American cougar. This has led to the overgrazing and browsing of many plants of the Appalachian forests, as well as destruction of agricultural crops. Other deer include the moose (Alces alces ), found only in the north, and the elk (Cervus canadensis), which, although once extirpated, is now making a comeback, through transplantation, in the southern and central Appalachians. In Quebec, the Chic-Chocs host the only population of reindeer (Rangifer tarandus) south of the St. Lawrence River. An additional species that is common in the north but extends its range southward at high elevations to Virginia and West Virginia is the varying or snowshoe hare (Lepus americanus). However, these central Appalachian populations are scattered and very small.

Another species of great interest is the beaver (Castor canadensis), which is showing a great resurgence in numbers after its near extirpation for its pelt. This resurgence is bringing about a drastic alteration in habitat through the construction of dams and other structures throughout the mountains.

Other common forest animals are the black bear (Ursus americanus), striped skunk (Mephitis mephitis), raccoon (Procyon lotor), opossum (Didelphis virginianus), woodchuck (Marmota monax), bobcat (Lynx rufus), gray fox (Urocyon cinereoargenteus), red fox (Vulpes vulpes) and in recent years, the coyote (Canis latrans), another species favored by the advent of Europeans and the extirpation of eastern and red wolves (Canis rufus). European boars (Sus scrofa) were introduced in the early 20th century.

Characteristic birds of the forest are wild turkey (Meleagris gallopavo silvestris), ruffed grouse (Bonasa umbellus), mourning dove (Zenaida macroura), common raven (Corvus corax), wood duck (Aix sponsa), great horned owl (Bubo virginianus), barred owl (Strix varia), screech owl (Megascops asio), red-tailed hawk (Buteo jamaicensis), red-shouldered hawk (Buteo lineatus), and northern goshawk, as well as a great variety of "songbirds" (Passeriformes), like the warblers in particular.

Of great importance are the many species of salamanders and, in particular, the lungless species (family Plethodontidae) that live in great abundance concealed by leaves and debris, on the forest floor. Most frequently seen, however, is the eastern or red-spotted newt (Notophthalmus viridescens), whose terrestrial eft form is often encountered on the open, dry forest floor. It has been estimated that salamanders represent the largest class of animal biomass in the Appalachian forests. Frogs and toads are of lesser diversity and abundance, but the wood frog (Rana sylvatica) is, like the eft, commonly encountered on the dry forest floor, while a number of species of small frogs, such as spring peepers (Pseudacris crucifer), enliven the forest with their calls. Salamanders and other amphibians contribute greatly to nutrient cycling through their consumption of small life forms on the forest floor and in aquatic habitats.

Although reptiles are less abundant and diverse than amphibians, a number of snakes are conspicuous members of the fauna. One of the largest is the non-venomous black rat snake (Elaphe obsoleta obsoleta), while the common garter snake (Thamnophis sirtalis) is among the smallest but most abundant. The eastern copperhead (Agkistrodon contortrix) and the timber rattler (Crotalus horridus) are venomous pit vipers. There are few lizards, but the broad-headed skink (Eumeces laticeps), at up to 13 in (33 cm) in length, and an excellent climber and swimmer, is one of the largest and most spectacular in appearance and action. The most common turtle is the eastern box turtle (Terrapene carolina carolina), which is found in both upland and lowland forests in the central and southern Appalachians. Prominent among aquatic species is the large common snapping turtle (Chelydra serpentina), which occurs throughout the Appalachians.

Appalachian streams are notable for their highly diverse freshwater fish life. Among the most abundant and diverse are those of the minnow family (family Cyprinidae), while species of the colorful darters (Percina spp.) are also abundant.

A characteristic fish of shaded, cool Appalachian forest streams is the wild brook or speckled trout (Salvelinus fontinalis), which is much sought after as a game fish. Water Striders (family Gerridae) are insects commonly seen on the surface of calm streams and ponds.

== See also ==
- Appalachia
- Appalachian American
- Appalachian League
- Appalachian Mountain Club
- Appalachian Trail
- List of subranges of the Appalachian Mountains

== Sources ==
- Topographic maps and Geologic Folios of the United States Geological Survey
- Goodge, J. W.; Vervoort, J. D.; Fanning, C. M.; Brecke, D. M.; Farmer, G. L.; Williams, I. S.; Myrow, P. M.; DePaolo, D. J. (2008). "A positive test of East Antarctica–Laurentia juxtaposition within the Rodinia supercontinent" (PDF). Science. 321 (5886): 235–240. Bibcode:2008Sci...321..235G. doi:10.1126/science.1159189. ISSN 0036-8075. PMID 18621666. S2CID 11799613.
- Loewy, S. L.; Dalziel, I. W. D.; Pisarevsky, S.; Connelly, J. N.; Tait, J.; Hanson, R. E.; Bullen, D. (2011). "Coats Land crustal block, East Antarctica: A tectonic tracer for Laurentia?". Geology. 39 (9): 859–862. Bibcode:2011Geo....39..859L. doi:10.1130/G32029.1.
