= Page, Virginia =

Unincorporated community in Virginia, United States

Coordinates: 37°10′47″N 81°59′43″W

Page is an unincorporated community in Buchanan County, Virginia, United States.

== History ==
A post office called Page was established in 1936, and remained in operation until it was discontinued in 1963. The community was named after Page, West Virginia.
