= Apple Orchard Mountain =

Mountain in Virginia, United States

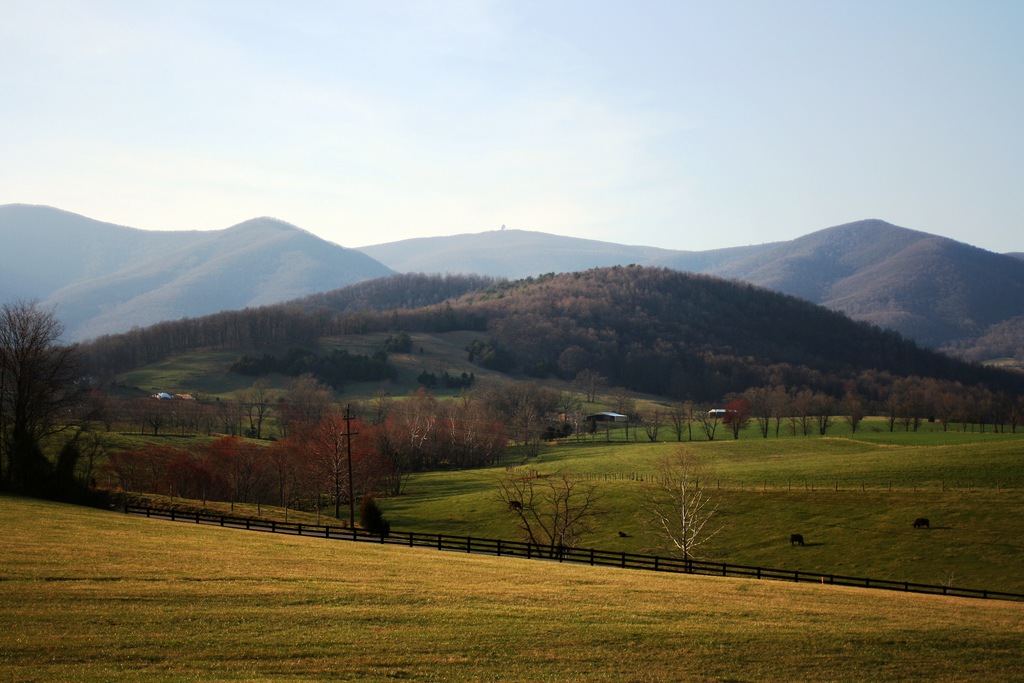
- Apple Orchard Mountain in the top center with the distinctive FAA Radome on the summit.

Highest point
- Elevation: 4,224 ft (1,287 m)
- Prominence: 2,835 ft (864 m)
- Coordinates: 37°31′01″N 79°30′37″W

Geography
- Location within Virginia
- Location: Bedford / Botetourt counties, Virginia, U.S.
- Parent range: Blue Ridge Mountains
- Topo map: USGS Arnold Valley

Climbing
- Easiest route: Hike

Apple Orchard Mountain is a peak of the Blue Ridge Mountains in Virginia.

Located in George Washington and Jefferson National Forests, Apple Orchard Mountain is the county highpoint for both Bedford County and Botetourt County, Virginia as well as the highest point on the Blue Ridge Parkway in Virginia. It is also the most topographically prominent mountain in the state. The summit is open, and an FAA radar stands nearby. This radar stand makes the mountain recognizable from miles away.
