= Senator Buchanan (disambiguation) =

James Buchanan (1791–1868) was a U.S. Senator from Pennsylvania from 1834 to 1845. Senator Buchanan may also refer to:

- Andrew Buchanan (American politician) (1780–1848), Pennsylvania State Senate
- Benjamin Franklin Buchanan (1857–1932), Virginia State Senate
- Brian Buchanan (politician) (fl. 2010s–2020s), Indiana State Senate
- Hugh Buchanan (politician) (1823–1890), Georgia State Senate
- J. W. Buchanan (1869–1941), Arizona State Senate
- John C. Buchanan (Virginia politician) (1911–1991), Virginia State Senate
- John Preston Buchanan (1888–1937), Virginia State Senate
