= Senator Gunter =

Senator Gunter or Gunther may refer to:

- Ben T. Gunter (1865–1939), Virginia State Senate
- Ben T. Gunter Jr. (1902–1980), Virginia State Senate
- Bill Gunter (1934–2024), Florida State Senate
- Linda Hinkleman Gunter (born 1951), North Carolina State Senate
- William Adams Gunter Jr. (1871–1940), Alabama State Senate
- George Gunther (1919–2012), Connecticut State Senate
