= Charles W. Steele =

American politician

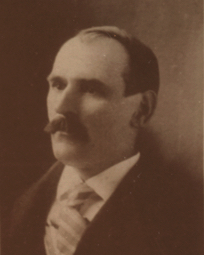
- Portrait of Steele, circa 1899

Member of the Virginia Senate from the 1st district
- In office December 1, 1897 – December 4, 1901
- Preceded by: Benjamin F. Buchanan
- Succeeded by: J. Cloyd Byars

Personal details
- Born: Charles Winton Steele; July 24, 1858 Tazewell, Virginia, U.S.
- Died: March 22, 1943 (aged 84) Abingdon, Virginia, U.S.
- Party: Democratic
- Spouse: Kansas Rosalie Ferrell

Charles Winton Steele (July 24, 1858 – March 22, 1943) was an American lawyer and politician who served as a member of the Virginia Senate.

Senate of Virginia
Preceded by Benjamin F. Buchanan	Virginia Senator for the 1st District; 1897–1901	Succeeded by J. Cloyd Byars
