= Annabel Morris Buchanan =

American composer and folklorist

- Born: October 22, 1888; Groesbeck, Texas
- Died: January 6, 1983 (aged 94); Paducah, Kentucky
- Occupations: Composer, folklorist
- Employers: University of Richmond; Madison College
- Spouse: John Preston Buchanan (m. 1912; died 1937)

Annabel Morris Buchanan (October 22, 1888 – January 6, 1983) was an American composer and folklorist. The author of the book Folk Hymns of America (1938) as well as myriad journal articles, Buchanan (along with John Powell) helped found the White Top Folk Festival (hosted in Grayson County, Virginia, from 1931 to 1939), which promoted music of the people in the Appalachian Mountains. Buchanan's documenting practices are credited for preserving many folk songs that might have otherwise gone on unrecorded.

== Biography ==
Buchanan was born Annie Bell Morris on October 22, 1888, in Groesbeck, Texas. Her father, William Caruthers Morris, worked for a local newspaper before becoming a minister in the Presbyterian Church; her mother, Anna Virginia Foster Morris, was a teacher. In 1901, Annabel moved with her family to Maury County, Tennessee. In 1906, she graduated with honors from the Landon Conservatory in Dallas; it was at this time that she took the name Annabel. She went on to teach music at Halsell College in Vinita, Oklahoma (1907–08) and the Stonewall Jackson Institute in Abingdon, Virginia (1909–12). In 1912, Annabel married John Preston Buchanan, a lawyer who would eventually serve as a member of the Virginia Senate, representing the state's 1st district.

In 2018 the Virginia Capitol Foundation announced that Buchanan's name would be on the Virginia Women's Monument's glass Wall of Honor.
