= J. Cloyd Byars =

American lawyer and politician

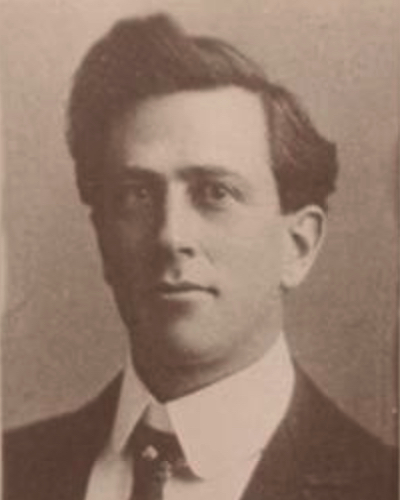
- Portrait of Byars, circa 1902

Member of the Virginia Senate from the 1st district
- In office December 4, 1901 – January 10, 1906
- Preceded by: Charles W. Steele
- Succeeded by: Alanson T. Lincoln

Personal details
- Born: Joseph Cloyd Byars; December 9, 1868 Glade Spring, Virginia, U.S.
- Died: May 17, 1954 (aged 85) Blountville, Tennessee, U.S.
- Party: Democratic
- Spouse: Jane Rhea Bailey
- Education: University of Virginia

Joseph Cloyd Byars (December 9, 1868 – May 17, 1954) was an American lawyer and politician who served as a member of the Virginia Senate. He ran for Congress in Virginia's 9th congressional district in 1908 and for U.S. Senate in 1930.

Senate of Virginia
Preceded by Charles W. Steele	Virginia Senator for the 1st District; 1901–1906	Succeeded by Alanson T. Lincoln
