= Benjamin Buchanan =

Benjamin Buchanan may refer to:

- Brooks Jensen (Benjamin Buchanan, born 2001), American professional wrestler
- Benjamin Franklin Buchanan (1857–1932), American lawyer and politician
