= Monty Mason =

American politician from Virginia

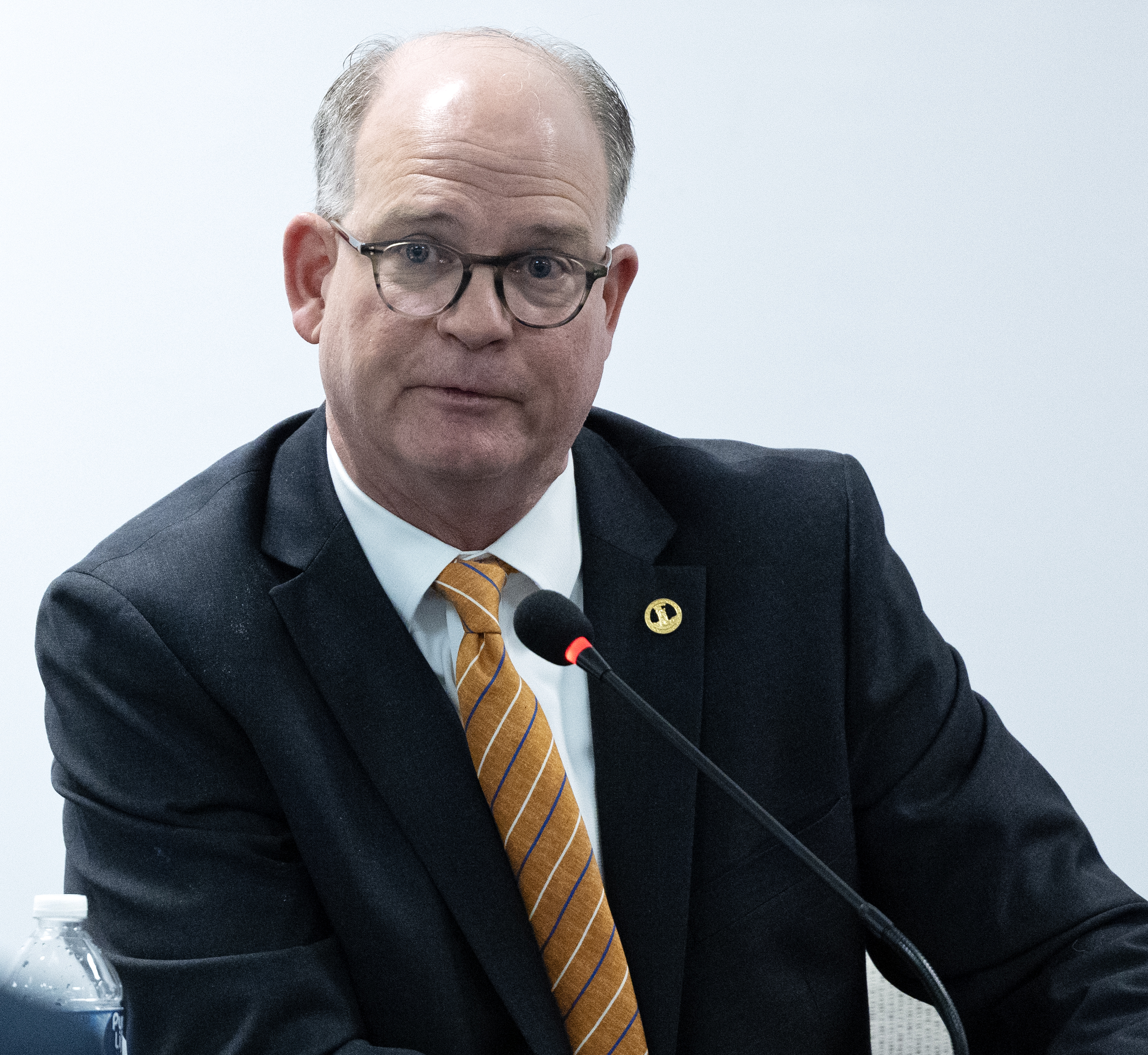

Member of the Virginia Senate from the 1st district
- In office November 23, 2016 – January 10, 2024
- Preceded by: John Miller
- Succeeded by: Danny Diggs (Redistricting)

Member of the Virginia House of Delegates from the 93rd district
- In office January 8, 2014 – November 21, 2016
- Preceded by: Michael Watson
- Succeeded by: Michael Mullin

Personal details
- Born: Taylor Montgomery Mason; September 8, 1967 (age 59) Farmville, Virginia
- Party: Democratic
- Education: College of William & Mary
- Committees: Agriculture, Conservation and Natural Resources; Commerce and Labor; General Laws and Technology; Privileges and Elections; Rehabilitation and Social Services
- Website: Senate website

Taylor Montgomery Mason (born September 8, 1967) is an American politician from Virginia. A member of the Democratic Party, Mason served as a member of the Virginia Senate for the 1st district from 2016 to 2024. From 2014 to 2016 he represented the 93rd district in the Virginia House of Delegates.

== Early life ==
Mason was born in Farmville, Virginia. He attended the College of William & Mary, and graduated in 1989 with a degree in government. While at William & Mary, Mason was a member of the fraternity Pi Lambda Phi, which organized annual mock “slave auctions” to raise money. In the 1989 edition of the College’s yearbook, Mason is pictured and named alongside descriptions of these auctions.

Mason works for Visa Inc. as a senior director, specializing on fraud prevention and risk management.

== Political career ==
Mason ran for the 93rd district of the Virginia House of Delegates in the 2013 elections. He defeated incumbent Republican Michael B. Watson.

Following the death of Sen. John Miller, Mason ran and won election to the Virginia State Senate for District 1 in 2016. For the 2018 legislative session, Senator Mason sat on three committees: General Laws & Technology; Rehabilitation & Social Services; and, Agriculture, Conservation, & Natural Resources.

In the 2023 Virginia Senate election, he was redistricted to the 24th district but was unseated by Republican Danny Diggs.

== Electoral history ==
State Senate General Election in 1st District, 2016
Party	Candidate	Votes	%
Democrat	T. Montgomery Mason	49,251	58.1%
Republican	Thomas Richard Holston	31,740	37.4%
Independent	John Bernard Bloom	3,534	4.2%

State Senate Primary Election in 1st District, 2016
Party	Candidate	Votes	%
Democrat	T. Montgomery Mason	3,498	57.4%
Democrat	Shelly Anne Simonds	2,590	42.5%

House of Delegates General Election in 93rd District, 2015
Party	Candidate	Votes	%
Democrat	T. Montgomery Mason	8,910	54.7%
Republican	Lara Shearin Overy	7,354	45.1%

House of Delegates General Election in 93rd District, 2013
Party	Candidate	Votes	%
Democrat	T. Montgomery Mason	12,132	52.1%
Republican	Michael Bowen Watson (inc.)	11,094	47.6%

== Personal life ==
Mason is a resident of Williamsburg, Virginia.

Virginia House of Delegates
Preceded by Michael Watson	Member of the Virginia House of Delegates from the 93rd district 2014–2016	Succeeded by Michael Mullin
Senate of Virginia
Preceded by John Miller	Member of the Virginia Senate from the 1st district 2016–2024	Succeeded by Timmy French
