= Homer L. Ferguson High School =

High school in Virginia, United States

Coordinates: 37°3′40″N 76°29′24″W

- Newport News, Virginia; United States

Information
- Established: 1961
- Closed: 1996

Ferguson High School was a high school in Newport News, Virginia, United States. It was named after Homer L. Ferguson, the president of Newport News Shipbuilding from July 22, 1915, until July 31, 1946. It was operated by Newport News Public Schools. The building opened as Warwick Junior High School in 1956 and became Ferguson High School in 1961.

The school closed in 1996, and was used by adjacent Christopher Newport University until the early 2000s. Parts of the former school were integrated into the Ferguson Center for the Performing Arts, a theater and concert hall, on the campus of Christopher Newport University.

== Notable alumni ==
- Larry Bethea, played for the Dallas Cowboys in the NFL
- Aaron Brooks, NFL player; played for the Green Bay Packers, New Orleans Saints, and the Oakland Raiders
- Patricia Goodson, concert pianist
- Dan Henning, former football coach at Ferguson; former head coach of the Atlanta Falcons (1983–1986), the San Diego Chargers (1989–1991) and of the Boston College Eagles (1994–96)
- Michael Vick, played for the Atlanta Falcons, Philadelphia Eagles, Pittsburgh Steelers, and New York Jets; attended Ferguson and transferred to Warwick High School in his sophomore year after Ferguson closed
- Charles Q. Brown Jr., Chairman Joint Chiefs of Staff (2023–present)
- Ronnie Ray, track and field athlete
