= E. Almer Ames Jr. =

American politician

Member of the Virginia Senate from the 1st district
- In office January 11, 1956 – January 10, 1968
- Preceded by: V. Alfred Etheridge
- Succeeded by: William E. Fears

Personal details
- Born: Edward Almer Ames Jr. January 22, 1903 Onley, Virginia, U.S.
- Died: May 19, 1987 (aged 84) Nassawadox, Virginia, U.S.
- Party: Democratic
- Spouse: Elizabeth Johnson Melson (m. 1936)
- Children: 1
- Education: Randolph-Macon College (BA); Washington and Lee University (LLB)
- Profession: Lawyer; politician

Edward Almer Ames Jr. (January 22, 1903 – May 19, 1987) was a Virginia lawyer and member of the Virginia General Assembly representing Virginia's Eastern shore between 1956 and 1968. A member of the Byrd Organization, Ames was also a member of the new legislative Boatwright Committee which investigated the NAACP as part of the Massive Resistance to racial integration vowed by U.S. Senator Harry F. Byrd after the U.S. Supreme Court decisions in Brown v. Board of Education.

== Early and family life ==
Ames was borne in Onley, Virginia in January 1903 to Edward Almer Ames (1856-1939) and his wife Lena E. Trower (1871-1952). He had an elder brother Floyd (1896-1972) and sister Margaret (b. 1899), as well as a younger sister Ethel (1909-2003). Almer Ames attended Randolph-Macon College, and joined Phi Delta Phi and Phi Beta Kappa before graduating with a B.A. degree. He then attended Washington and Lee University in Lexington, Virginia and won election to the Order of the Coif before graduating with an LL.B. degree. He married Elizabeth Johnson Melson in January 1936, and they had a son, E. Almer Ames III.

== Career ==
After admission to the Virginia bar, Ames practiced law with his father. During World War II, Accomack County voters elected Ames commonwealth attorney (prosecutor), and he served from 1943 until 1955. He was also vice-president (then President) and a director of the First National Bank in Onancock, which later was bought by First Virginia Bancshares, Inc. From 1948 until 1967, Ames was chairman of the Accomack County Democratic Party, and beginning in 1955 on the Virginia Democratic State Central Committee. He was also active in the Freemasons (past master), Rotary Club, Ruritan Club and various bar associations.

In 1955 after V. Alfred Etheridge who represented 1st senatorial district announced his retirement, Ames won the Democratic primary, defeating Accomack's delegate in the Virginia House, Wrendo M. Godwin, and later won the general election. The first district then included Accomack and Northampton Counties on the Virginia's Eastern Shore, as well as Princess Anne County that Etheridge had represented as commonwealth's attorney before winning the part-time state senate position). Redistricting (or the town's incorporation) added Virginia Beach.

Ames first won election as the Massive Resistance to racial integration in the public schools grew. The Virginia General Assembly passed the Stanley Plan in a special session that began in September 1956. Among the many laws in the package were seven expanding the common law legal offenses of champerty, maintenance, barratry, running and capping, as well as the statutory violation of unauthorized practice of law. Two joint legislative committees were created to investigate the NAACP (which was pursuing the legal cases to desegregate Virginia schools) as well as desegregation advocates more generally. The President of the Virginia Senate appointed the newly elected Ames and fellow former Commonwealth Attorney Earl A. Fitzpatrick of Roanoke (who became Vice-Chairman of the new Committee on Offenses against the Administration of Justice); the Speaker of the House of Delegates appointed veteran delegate and attorney John B. Boatwright to chair the Committee, with newcomer William F. Stone (later elected to the state Senate) and veteran J. J. Williams Jr. as the remaining members. Shortly after the January 1957 session began, the committee issued letters requesting information from the NAACP, as well as the Defenders of State Sovereignty and Individual Liberties and other segregationist organizations, and during the next month began subpoenaing NAACP membership lists. These activities prompted NAACP motions to quash the subpoenas in Richmond and several Virginia counties. In March, the Boatwright Committee formerly opined that various segregationist organizations did not commit the newly expanded legal offenses of champerty, maintenance, barratry, running and capping, nor the unauthorized practice of law. However, the commission's report issued November 13, 1957 recommended enforcement of those laws against the various named NAACP lawyers. The subpoenas and other activities soon reduced NAACP membership in Virginia by half, and two years later, Boatwright was still complaining that the Virginia State Bar was not punishing those lawyers but instead spending $5000 on a Jamestown commemoration and $6350 on a new continuing legal education program.

Meanwhile, on January 19, 1959, both a three-judge federal panel and the Virginia Supreme Court declared the Stanley Plan unconstitutional. Ultimately, the Boatwright committee's handiwork was declared unconstitutional in NAACP v. Button, as had the practices of the Thomson committee (also established in the Stanley Plan) in Scull v. Virginia ex rel. Committee on Law Reform & Racial Activities back in May 1958, just before the interim Harrison v. NAACP had temporarily sent the NAACP case to the Virginia Supreme Court for interpretation. When the Virginia Supreme Court only invalidated one of the seven anti-NAACP laws, the NAACP case returned to the U.S. Supreme Court, where it was argued in 1961, then reargued in late 1962 before the 6 to 3 decision was issued in January 1963. Unlike fellow committee member Fitzpatrick, Ames was re-elected in both 1959 and 1963.

In 1967, William E. Fears, a World War II Air Force veteran and Democrat who served as Accomack County's Commonwealth attorney and who had long disagreed with Byrd Democrats Charles M. Lankford and Ames, defeated Ames in the Democratic primary. Redistricting after passage of the Civil Rights Act of 1964 as well as the U.S. Supreme Court decision in Davis v. Mann meant the First Senatorial District encompassed conservative Accomack and Northampton Counties on the Eastern Shore, as well as Mathews, Gloucester and York Counties on the peninsula (which included liberal Williamsburg with its College of William and Mary). In later reorganizations, Virginia Beach joined Chesapeake and Portsmouth which became the 3rd District, collectively represented by three senators. Although Byrd Democrats greatly resented Fears' election over Ames (and Stone approached him in the Senate chamber to tell him so), and Fears had opponents in both the primary and general elections in 1971, he was re-elected and served two decades in the state Senate, until defeated in 1991 by Republican Tommy Norment of Virginia Beach.

== Death ==
Ames died in the N.A.M. hospital at Nassawadox in Northampton County, Virginia on May 19, 1987.

Senate of Virginia
Preceded by V. Alfred Etheridge	Virginia Senator for the 1st district 1956–1967	Succeeded by William E. Fears
