= Whitetop Mountain (conservation area) =

Protected area in Virginia, USA

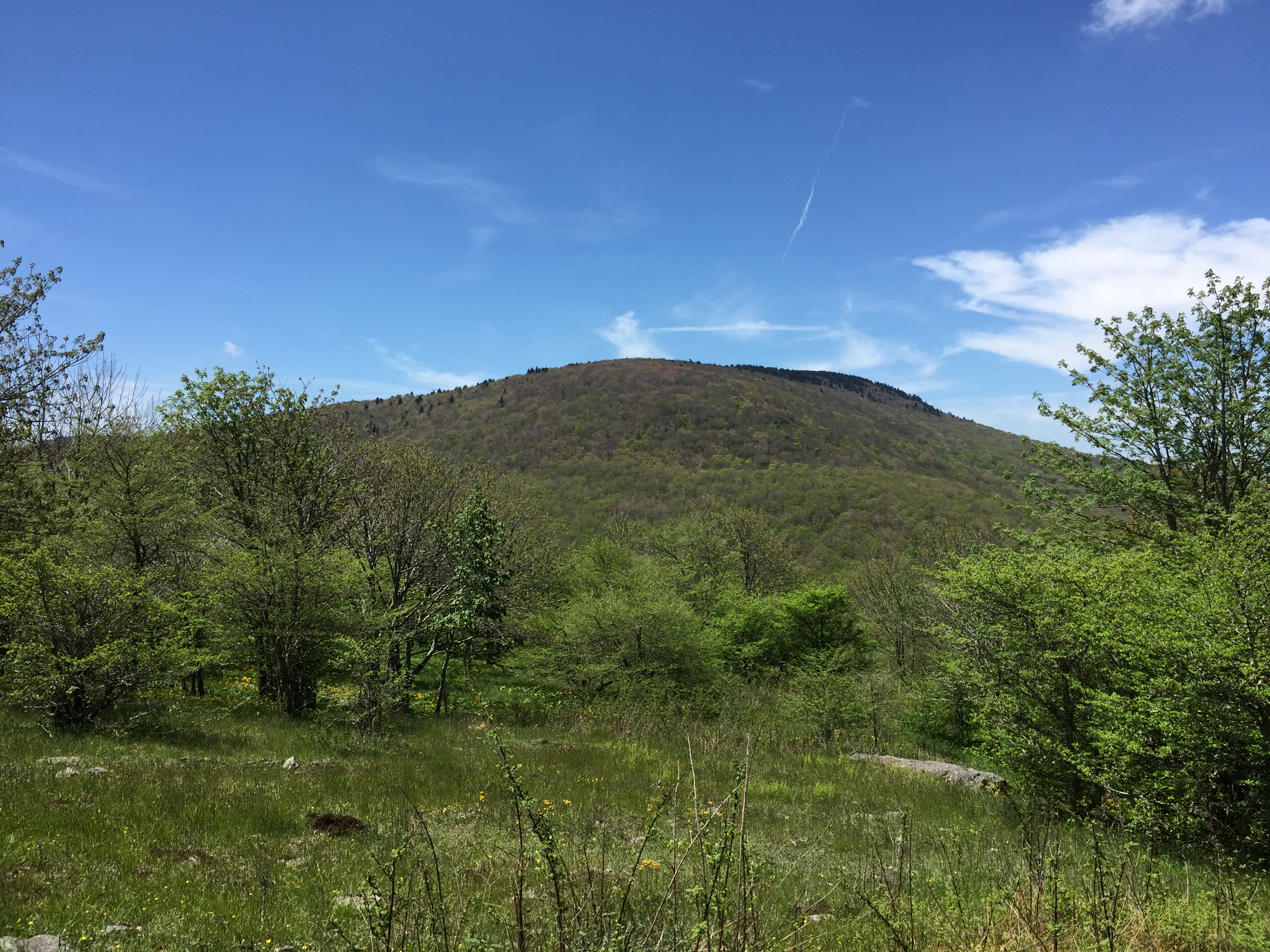
- View southwest towards Whitetop Mountain from the Appalachian Trail on Elk Garden Ridge, within the Mount Rogers National Recreation Area in Smyth County, Virginia

- Location within Virginia
- Location: Virginia, United States
- Coordinates: 36°38′31″N 81°36′25″W
- Area: 5,919 acres (23.95 km^{2})

Whitetop Mountain (conservation area) is a wildland in the George Washington and Jefferson National Forests of western Virginia that has been recognized by the Wilderness Society as a special place worthy of protection from logging and road construction. The Wilderness Society has designated the area as a "Mountain Treasure".

The second highest mountain in the Mount Rogers National Recreation Area, Whitetop Mountain and nearby Buzzard Knob are a commanding presence with a vertical elevation of 3500 feet and good views over the South Holston River at Damascus.

The area is part of the Mount Rogers Cluster.

== Location and access ==
The area is located in the Appalachian Mountains of Southwestern Virginia about 2.4 miles southeast of Konnarock, Virginia between Va 603 on the north, and US 58 on the south and east, and Va 605. It is next to the Lewis Fork Wilderness to the east.

The Appalachian Trail extends for 6.3 miles through the area, entering on the west from Lewis Fork Wilderness, climbing to Buzzard Knob and then leaving at Va 601, Beech Mountain Road, on the west.

Several roads provide access to the area. VA 600 (Whitetop Road) connects US 58 with VA 603 (Little Laurel Road) while passing through Elk Garden, the point where the Appalachian Trail crosses the road. Forest Road 89 begins on VA 600 and reaches the summit of Whitetop Mountain. Forest Roads 89A, 89B, and 89C are short spur roads off FR 89 .

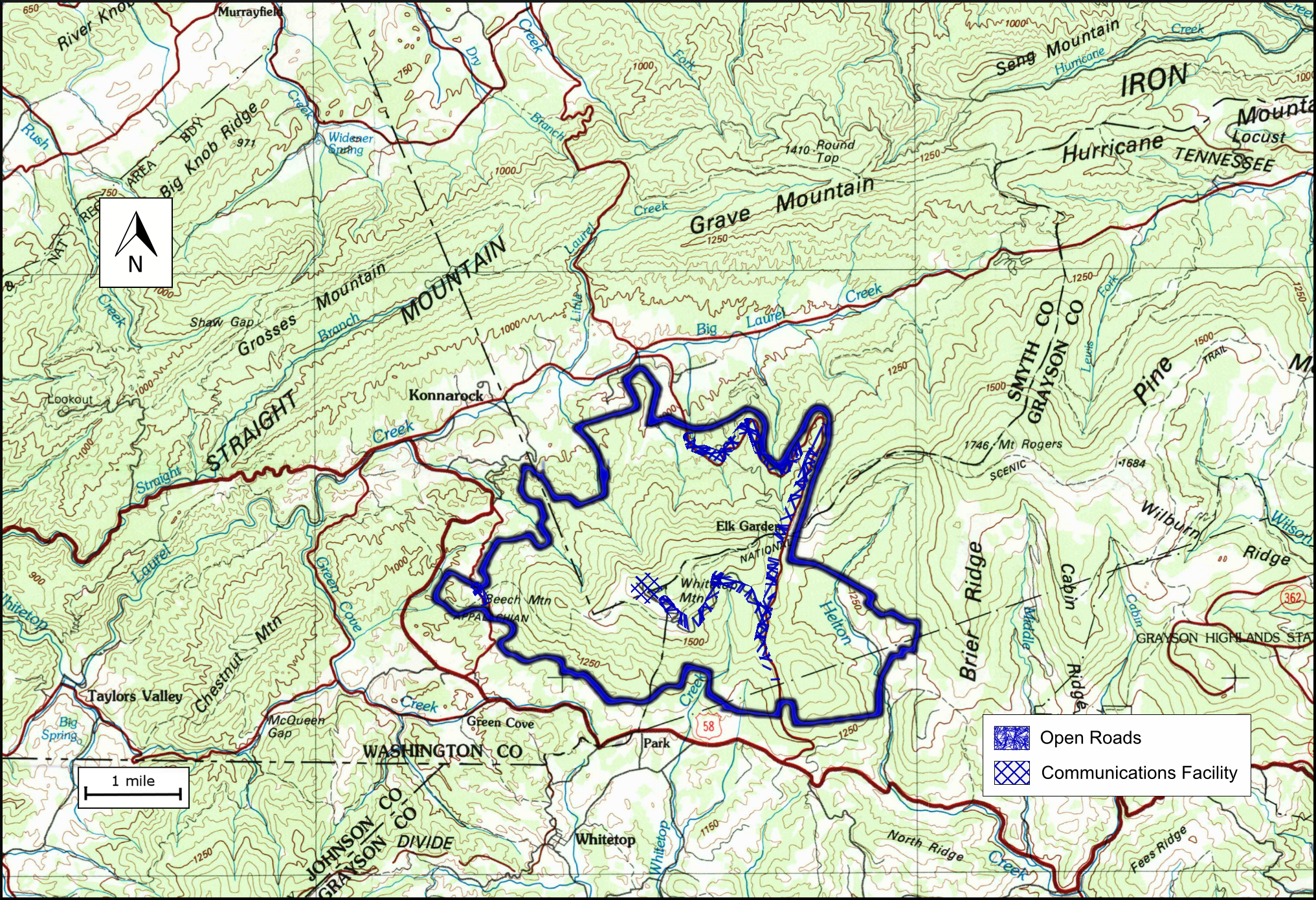
Boundary of the Whitetop Mountain wild area as identified by the Wilderness Society.

The boundary of the wildland as determined by the Wilderness Society is shown in the adjacent map. Additional roads and trails are given on National Geographic Maps 786 (Mount Rogers). and Map 318 (Mount Rogers High Country) A great variety of information, including topographic maps, aerial views, satellite data and weather information, is obtained by selecting the link with the wild land's coordinates in the upper right of this page.

Beyond maintained trails, old logging roads can be used to explore the area. The Appalachian Mountains were extensively timbered in the early twentieth century leaving logging roads that are becoming overgrown but still passable. Old logging roads and railroad grades can be located by consulting the historical topographic maps available from the United States Geological Survey (USGS). The Whitetop Mountain wild area is covered by USGS topographic maps Konnarock, Whitetop Mountain and Park.

== Natural history ==
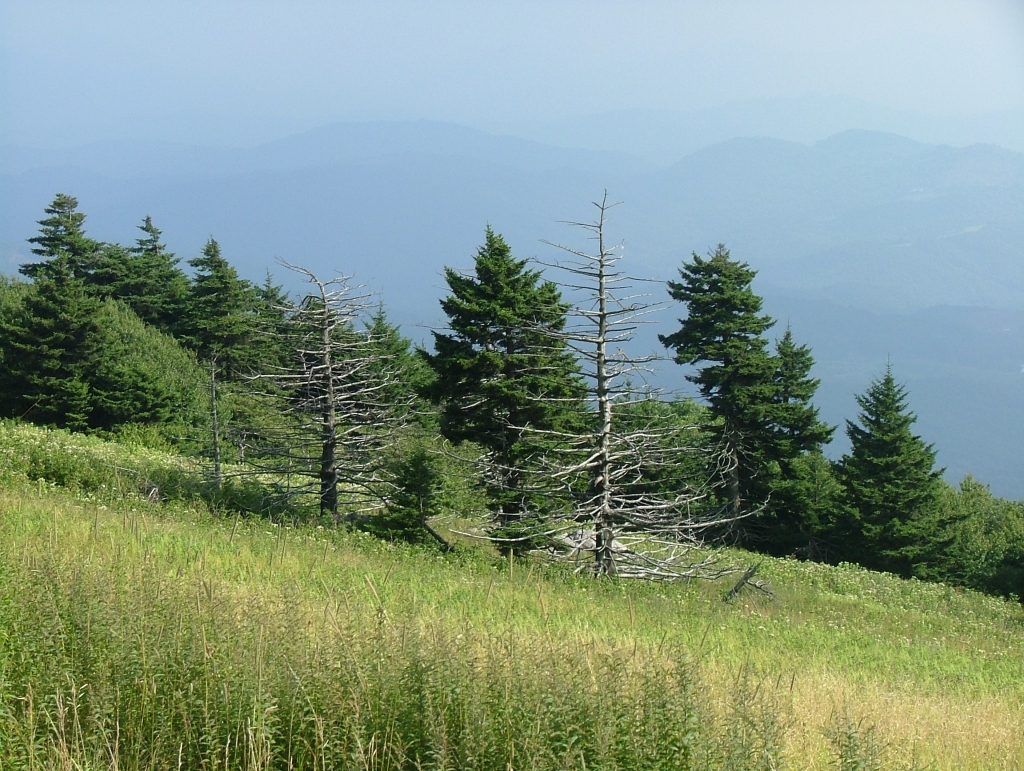
The fir-spruce mountain meadows on Whitetop Mountain

Unusual species include the northern flying squirrel, northern saw-whet owl, purple finch, Swanson's thrush, magnolia warbler, red crossbill, winter wren, peregrine falcon, Blue Ridge St. John's wort, mountain rattlesnake root, mountain bittercress, Grays lilly, and three-toothed cinquefoil. There is a salamander special management area on the north side of Whitetop Mountain with the greatest known diversity of salamanders for any area on earth of comparable size. The pygmy salamander, shovelnose salamander and Weller's salamander are found here.

Several stands of old growth forest have been identified on the southern side of the area. Frazer Fir and red spruce are found at the summit of Whitetop, while beech and maple are dominant below 4700 feet.

Six streams in the area, Daves Branch, Big Branch, Pennington Branch, Helton Creek, Whitetop Creek, and Sturgill Branch, are recognized for their water quality. Wild natural trout streams in Virginia are classified by the Department of Game and Inland Fisheries by their water quality, with class i the highest and class iv the lowest. These streams are class ii streams.

== Topography ==
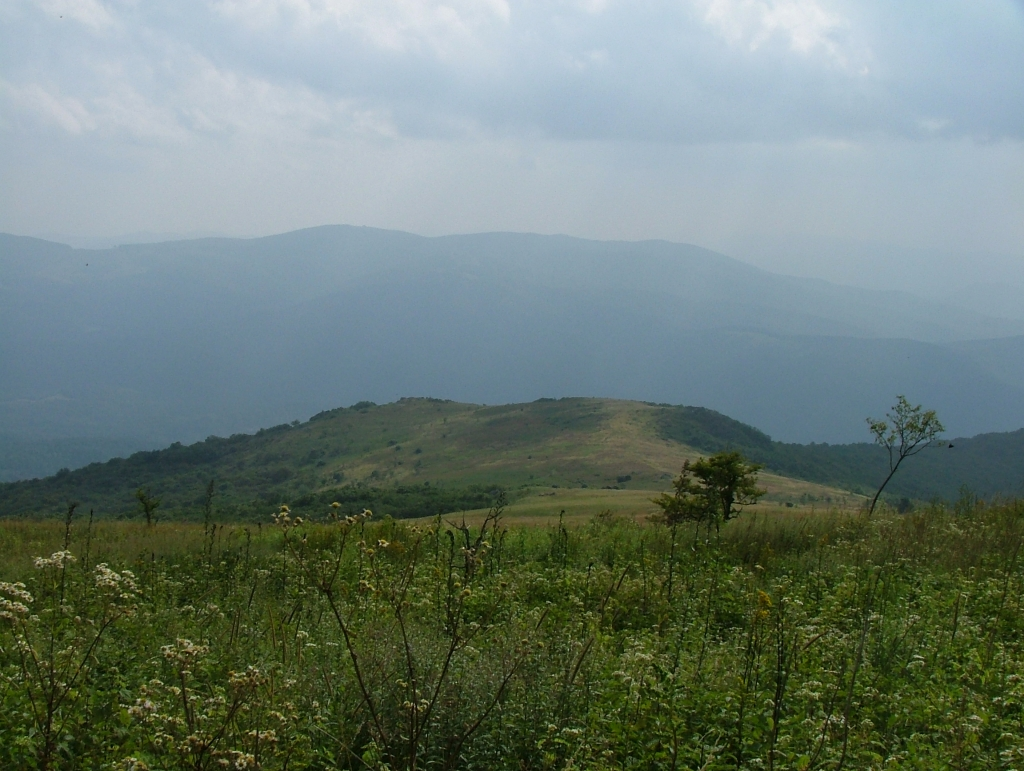
A view of Buzzard Rock from Whitetop Mountain

As part of the Southern Blue Ridge Mountains Subsection within the Central Appalachian Broadleaf Coniferous Forest-Meadow Province, there are tectonic uplifted mountain ranges composed of igneous and metamorphic rock with many high gradient, deeply incised streams.

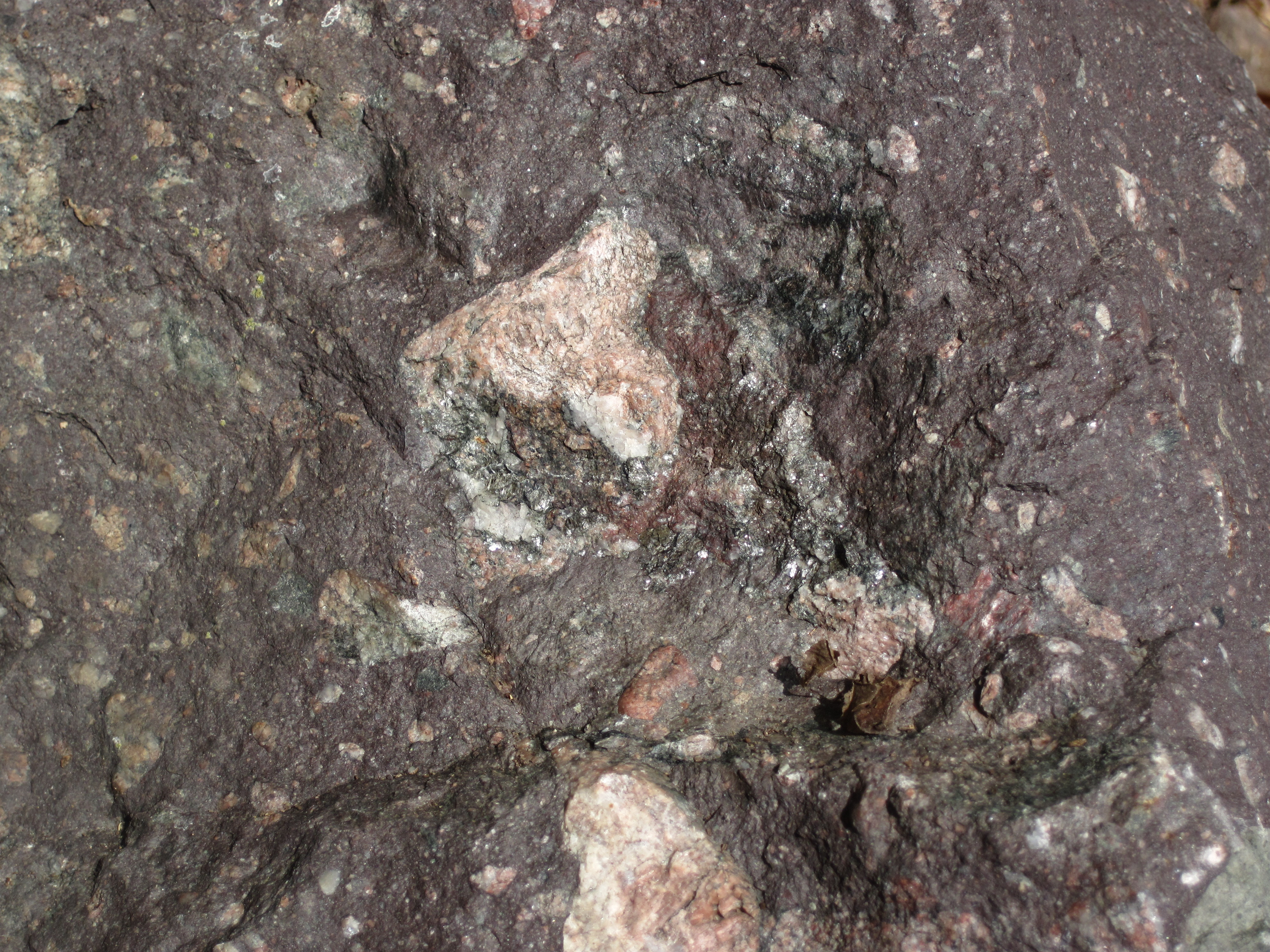
Cranberry gneiss

Cranberry gneiss, a billion year old rock formation, is visible on the west of the summit below buzzard rock. The area is divided into two parts by Whitetop Road. The section to the east of Whitetop Rd, containing the drainage of Helton Creek, provides a wildlife link between the Lewis Fork Wilderness and the Whitetop Mountain area to the west.

Elk Garden is at a wind gap between Mount Rogers and Whitetop Mountain. The gap, at the divide between the New River and Tennessee River drainages, was formed by a primeval stream left dry by changing erosion patterns between the two drainages.

== Forest Service management ==
The Forest Service has conducted a survey of their lands to determine the potential for wilderness designation. Wilderness designation provides a high degree of protection from development. The areas that were found suitable are referred to as inventoried roadless areas. Later a Roadless Rule was adopted that limited road construction in these areas. The rule provided some degree of protection by reducing the negative environmental impact of road construction and thus promoting the conservation of roadless areas. Whitetop Mountain was not inventoried in the roadless area review, and therefore not protected from possible road construction and timber sales.

The mountain balds, dating back to the 1800s or earlier, are maintained by prescribed burning, with burns every two or three years depending on conditions.

Most of the area is part of the 5100 acre "Whitetop Mountain Special Area. The special area's management goal is to provide habitat for rare species. While not suitable for large-scale timber harvesting, some logging is allowed.

== See also ==
- Mount Rogers Cluster
- Appalachian balds
- Whitetop Mountain
