= Ferguson Center for the Arts =

Theater in Newport News, Virginia

- Address: 1 Avenue of the Arts; Newport News VA 23606
- Coordinates: 37.061°N 76.490°W
- Owner: Christopher Newport University
- Type: Theatre/Concert hall
- Capacity: 1725

Construction
- Opened: 2005
- Architect: Henry N. Cobb, Pei Cobb Freed & Partners

Website
- fergusoncenter.org

The Ferguson Center for the Arts is a theater and concert hall on the campus of Christopher Newport University in Newport News, Virginia, United States. The complex fully opened in September 2005 with two concert halls and many other facilities.

== Performing arts venues ==
The Ferguson Center for the Arts contains three distinct, separate concert halls: the Diamonstein Concert Hall, the Peebles Theater, and the Studio Theater.

=== Diamonstein Concert Hall ===
Diamonstein Concert Hall is the flagship auditorium in the complex. The hall is acoustically engineered so that anyone on stage can be heard from any seat without a microphone. The hall has 1,725 seats.

=== Peebles Theater ===
A 453-seat theater in the Ferguson Center for the Arts complex.

=== The Studio Theater ===
A 200-seat theater in the Ferguson Center for the Arts complex.

=== Other facilities ===
The building also contains rehearsal halls, a dance studio, full scenery, prop and costume shops, arts studios, Ferguson Hall Art Gallery, the Falk Gallery, music practice rooms, and many educational classrooms and other learning areas. The majority of these rooms opened in the Fall of 2005.

== History ==
Formerly, the Ferguson High School was located at 1 University Place. The name "Ferguson" is well known in the Newport News area because Homer L. Ferguson was the President of the nearby Newport News Shipbuilding & Dry Dock Company. The high school was named after him. Additionally, Newport News is home to the corporate headquarters of Ferguson Enterprises, a leading plumbing-supply company. Ferguson Enterprises sponsored the construction of the center, and was granted naming rights as a result of their contribution.

== Construction ==
The Ferguson Center was designed by Henry N. Cobb of Pei Cobb Freed & Partners. The center was constructed in two phases. The first phase of construction was completed in the summer months of 2004. The first phase completed the 440 seat Music and Theater Hall and a 200-seat Studio Theater. The second phase of construction was completed a year later. This added a 1,700-seat Concert Hall that was acoustically designed for stage performance. Most likely, when "The Ferguson Center" is mentioned outside of Christopher Newport University, this is what is being referred to. The construction was led by two opening acts. Tony Bennett performed in the Music and Theater hall on September 1, 2004. During the show, Tony Bennett remarked: "They don't make theaters like this anymore!". Actor and singer Michael Crawford opened the Concert Hall on September 12, 2005. The New York Pops accompanied him that night.

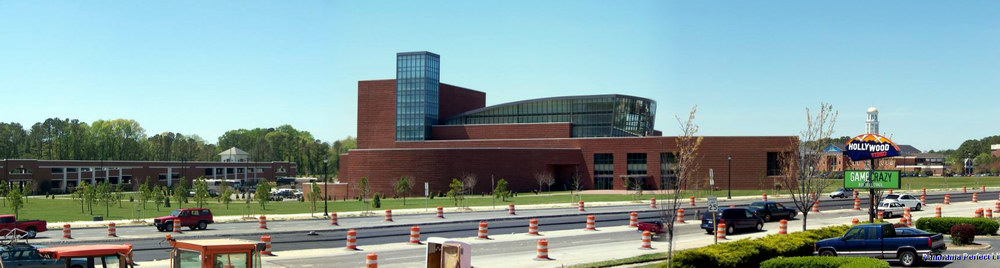

== Criticism ==
As theater plans and construction progressed, there was criticism within the CNU community, that money being spent on the project could be better spent in different academic ways. The university originally planned that the Ferguson Center would be unavailable for use by the university's music and theater departments, and any other non-administrative function on campus. The idea was to simply have a concert hall on campus. This policy was removed, and the Christopher Newport University’s theater, music and art departments are now housed in the center academic section of the building, This is the section of the building between the Concert Hall, and the Music and Theatre Hall.
