= Michael P. Mullin =

American politician

Michael Mullin

Member of the Virginia House of Delegates from the 93rd district
- In office November 22, 2016 – November 7, 2023
- Preceded by: Monty Mason
- Succeeded by: Jackie Glass (redistricting)

Virginia House Democratic Whip
- In office January 2020 – November 2023 Serving with Alfonso H. Lopez

Personal details
- Born: October 18, 1981 (age 44) Falls Church, Virginia, U.S.
- Party: Democratic
- Education: Christopher Newport University, Catholic University of America
- Occupation: Politician
- Committees: Courts of Justice; Counties Cities and Towns; Commerce and Labor
- Website: www.mullinforvirginia.com

Michael P. Mullin (born October 18, 1981), known as Mike Mullin, is a former assistant Commonwealth’s Attorney for the City of Hampton and an American politician of the Democratic Party. From 2016 to 2023 he represented (part-time) the 93rd district in the Virginia House of Delegates. He resigned on November 7, 2023.

== Early life and education ==
Mullin graduated from Wilbert Tucker Woodson High School in Fairfax, Virginia where he was active in theatre and speech and debate. He traveled to Virginia's Hampton Roads region for his college education, graduating from Christopher Newport University in 2004. He then studied law at Catholic University in Washington, D.C., graduating with a J.D. from the Columbus School of Law. He has five sons, lives in Williamsburg, Virginia with his wife Rebecca, and is active in the Christopher Newport University alumni association.

== Career ==
After admission to the Virginia bar, Mullin worked as an assistant prosecutor in Hampton, Virginia. He became active in the Virginia Bar Association and the Virginia Association of Commonwealth's Attorneys. The Virginia Gang Investigator's association has also named him a Certified Gang Investigator.

In November 2016, Mullin defeated Republican Heather Cordasco in a special election to fill the seat once held by Democrat Monty Mason, who won election to the Virginia Senate in another special election occasioned by the death of John Miller. Mullin also defeated Cordasco in the general elections in November 2017 and November 2019. The 93rd district covers parts of James City County, York County, Williamsburg, and Newport News.

In the Virginia House, Mullin serves as vice chair of the Rules Committee, as well as the Labor and Commerce Committee and the Courts of Justice Committee. Mullin shortly after his election sponsored "Heaven's law" to protect children from child abuse; on December 30, 2019 he introduced two bills for the upcoming session concerning protocols for referring schoolchildren to criminal justice authorities. Mullin served as the chair of a key subcommittee that can conduct hearings for rewriting Virginia's criminal code. On March 12, 2020, he noted progressive reforms passed in that Virginia legislative session, which passed legislation offering additional protections for 14 and 15 year old defendants, as well as ending drivers license suspensions for unpaid fees and fines, raising the felony threshold to $1,000, decriminalizing some marijuana offenses, reforming criminal discovery effective in the summer, expanding deferral options for certain misdemeanors, opening parole opportunities for certain "Fishback" defendants, and allowing jurors to be told about criminal punishment ranges. Mullin sponsored legislation abolishing Capital punishment in Virginia. In his final year as a legislator, Mullin passed legislation creating roadside historical markers commemorating Virginia locations mentioned in the Green Book.

In June 2024, Mullin became the Chair of the Board for State Navigate, an organization that is working to improve awareness of state legislatures.

== Electoral history ==
Date	Election	Candidate	Party	Votes	%
Virginia House of Delegates, 93rd district
Nov 8, 2016	Special Election	Michael P. Mullin	Democratic	20,417	53.5
Nov 8, 2016	Special Election	Heather L. Cordasco	Republican	17,634	46.2
Nov 8, 2016	Special Election	Write Ins		97	0.3
Nov 7, 2017	General	Michael P. Mullin	Democratic	15,988	60.0
Nov 7, 2017	General	Heather L. Cordasco	Republican	10,625	39.9
Nov 7, 2017	General	Write Ins		42	0.2
Nov 5, 2019	General	Michael P. Mullin	Democratic	14,344	55.67
Nov 5, 2019	General	Heather L. Cordasco	Republican	11,396	44.23
Nov 5, 2019	General	Write Ins		28	0.11
Nov 2, 2021	General	Michael P. Mullin	Democratic	17,048	51.6
Nov 2, 2021	General	Jordan Gray	Republican	15,968	48.3
Nov 2, 2021	General	Write Ins		40	0.1
