= Whitetop Mountain =

Mountain in Virginia, United States

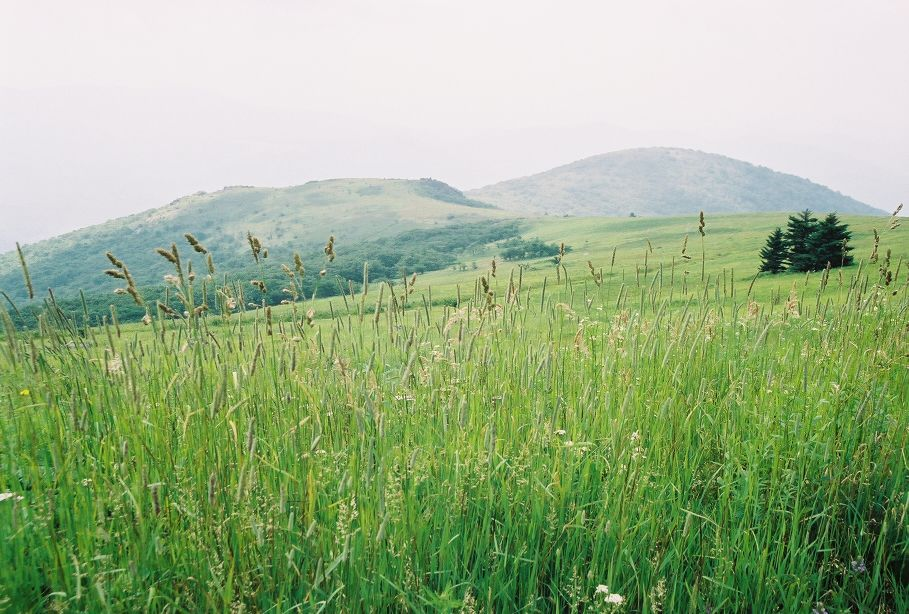
- View from Whitetop of Buzzard Rock and Beech Mountain.

Highest point
- Elevation: 5,525 ft (1,684 m)
- Prominence: 1,040 ft (320 m)
- Coordinates: 36°38′19″N 81°36′19″W

Geography
- Location: Grayson / Smyth / Washington counties, Virginia, U.S.
- Parent range: Appalachian Mountains, Blue Ridge Mountains
- Topo map: USGS Whitetop Mountain

Geology
- Mountain type: granite

Climbing
- Easiest route: Hike

Whitetop Mountain is the second highest independent mountain in the U.S. state of Virginia, after nearby Mount Rogers. It is also the third highest named peak in Virginia, after Mount Rogers and its subsidiary peak, Pine Mountain. It is located at the juncture of Grayson, Smyth, and Washington Counties, and is also within the Mount Rogers National Recreation Area of the Jefferson National Forest. Whitetop was the location of the White Top Folk Festival from 1932 to 1939, with the exception of 1937. Like nearby Mount Rogers, it represents an ecological "island" of flora and fauna commonly found much farther north than Virginia, such as old growth red spruce and other northern softwoods.

Whitetop Mountain is within a conservation area of the same name.

== See also ==
- Mount Rogers Cluster
- Whitetop Mountain (conservation area)
