= 1930 United States Senate election in Virginia =

- November 4, 1930
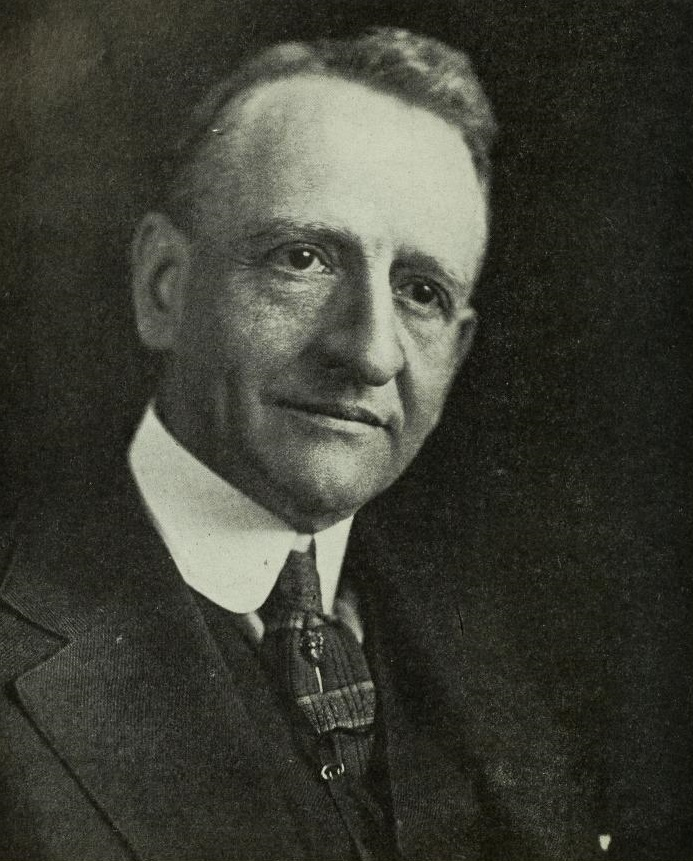

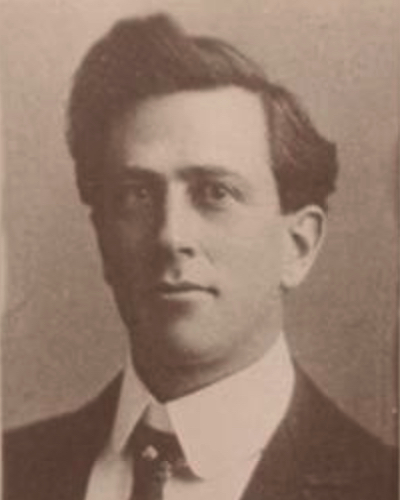

Nominee	Carter Glass	J. Cloyd Byars	Joe C. Morgan
Party	Democratic	Independent Democrat	Socialist
Popular vote	112,002	26,091	7,944
Percentage	76.67%	17.86%	5.44%
- County and independent city results Glass: 50–60% 60–70% 70–80% 80–90% >90%
U.S. senator before election
Carter Glass
Democratic
Elected U.S. Senator
Carter Glass
Democratic

The 1930 United States Senate election in Virginia was held on November 4, 1930. Incumbent Democratic Senator Carter Glass defeated Independent Democrat J. Cloyd Byars and Socialist Joe C. Morgan, and was elected to his third term in office.

== Results ==
United States Senate election in Virginia, 1930
Party	Candidate	Votes	%	±%
Democratic	Carter Glass (inc.)	112,002	76.67%	+3.55%
Independent Democrat	J. Cloyd Byars	26,091	17.86%	+17.86%
Socialist	Joe C. Morgan	7,944	5.44%	+5.44%
Write-ins		49	0.03%	+0.03%
Majority		85,911	58.81%	+9.87%
Turnout		146,086		
Democratic hold				

== See also ==
- United States Senate elections, 1930 and 1931
