= Michael Watson (Virginia politician) =

American politician (born 1961)

Member of the Virginia House of Delegates from the 93rd district
- In office January 2012 – January 2014
- Preceded by: Robin Abbott
- Succeeded by: Monty Mason

Personal details
- Born: September 19, 1961 (age 65) Hopewell, Virginia
- Party: Republican
- Spouse: Amy Michelle Bourbonais
- Children: Thomas (Cody), Adam, Taylor
- Education: Old Dominion University; New River Community College
- Occupation: Business Owner
- Committees: General Laws; Science and Technology
- Website: delegatewatson.com

Michael B. Watson (born September 19, 1961, in Hopewell, Virginia) is an American politician. A Republican, he was elected to the Virginia House of Delegates in 2011. He represented the 93rd district, made up of the city of Williamsburg and parts of the counties of James City and York and the city of Newport News on the Virginia Peninsula.

== Early life, education, business career ==
Watson was born in Hopewell, Virginia. His father was a millwright and a tugboat operator.

He attended Old Dominion University and New River Community College, receiving an A.A.S. degree in industrial instrumentation technology from the latter school in 1983.

In 1988 he established Control Automation Technologies Corporation (CATC), an industrial controls business, in North Carolina. He set up CATLab - Accredited Calibration Laboratories in 1999. On January 1, 2006, Control Automation Technologies Corp. was acquired by Instrumentation Services, Inc. Watson continued expanding CATLab, establishing a second laboratory in Virginia in 2006. On January 1, 2021, CATLab was acquired by France-based Trescal. As of 2023 Watson is a consultant for Trescal.

He married Amy Michelle Bourbonais. They have three sons. He lives in Gloucester, Virginia.

== Political career ==
Watson was the 2011 Republican nominee in the 93rd House district, whose Democratic incumbent, lawyer Robin Abbott, was redistricted out. Abbott moved back into the redrawn district and ran for reelection. Watson defeated her, with 51.7% of the vote.

During his first year in office Watson earned the legislature's second highest business rating from Virginia Free, won the Champion of Free Enterprise Award from the VA Chamber of Commerce, and was named Freshman Legislator of the Year. Following the 2013 session, Watson held VA Free's highest cumulative pro-business rating in the General Assembly by any member having served at least one full term and was awarded the Champion of Free Enterprise Award for the second consecutive year. He was also one of four founders of the General Assembly's first ever bi-partisan Business Development Caucus.

Watson lost his reelection bid to Monty Mason in 2013. In June 2014, Watson was named Coordinator of the Small Business Subcommittee under the Business Climate Industry Council of the Virginia Chamber of Commerce. with a mission of developing the Chamber's legislative agenda for the implementation of Blueprint Virginia. In November 2014, Watson was appointed to the Higher Education Advisory Committee to General Assembly's House Committee on Education. In 2023, VA Governor Glenn Youngkin appointed Watson to Virginia's Manufacturing Development Commission.
