= Michael Caro =

Puerto Rican international soccer player

Personal information
- Date of birth: 8 May 1985 (age 41)
- Place of birth: Arlington, Virginia, U.S.
- Position: Striker

Youth career
- 2001–2004: West Potomac Wolverines

College career
Years	Team	Apps	(Gls)
2005–2008	Christopher Newport Captains		

Senior career*
Years	Team	Apps	(Gls)
2006	Northern Virginia Royals	10	(0)

International career^{‡}
2008	Puerto Rico	2	(0)
- * Club domestic league appearances and goals as of 11:56, 10 April 2011 (UTC) ‡ National team caps and goals as of 11:56, 10 April 2011 (UTC)

Michael Caro (born 8 May 1985) is a Puerto Rican international soccer player who plays as a striker.

== Career ==
Caro played college soccer for Christopher Newport University, and made two international appearances for Puerto Rico in 2008.
