= V. Alfred Etheridge =

American politician

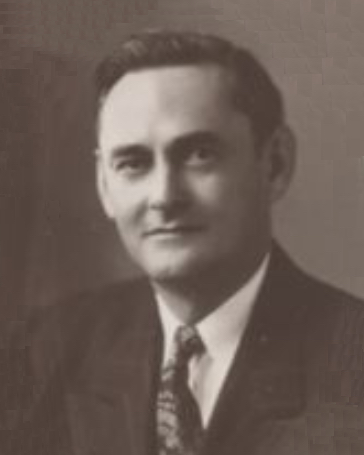
- Official portrait, 1952

Treasurer of Virginia Beach
- In office January 1, 1963 – December 31, 1977
- Preceded by: Lewis E. Smith (Note: Etheridge served as the treasurer of Princess Anne County from 1956 until 1963, when that municipality merged with the City of Virginia Beach, and he was chosen over incumbent Smith to become city treasurer.)
- Succeeded by: John T. Atkinson

Member of the Virginia Senate from the 1st district
- In office January 9, 1952 – January 11, 1956
- Preceded by: Ben T. Gunter Jr.
- Succeeded by: E. Almer Ames Jr.

Personal details
- Born: Vernon Alfred Etheridge; February 3, 1918 Princess Anne, Virginia, U.S.
- Died: November 10, 1997 (aged 79) Charlottesville, Virginia, U.S.
- Party: Democratic
- Spouse: Maribelle Malbon
- Education: Norfolk Division of the College of William & Mary

Vernon Alfred "Jack" Etheridge (February 3, 1918 – November 10, 1997) was an American politician who served as a member of the Virginia Senate and as the city treasurer of Virginia Beach.

== Notes ==
Senate of Virginia
Preceded by Ben T. Gunter Jr.	Virginia Senator for the 1st District; 1952–1956	Succeeded by E. Almer Ames Jr.
