= Phil Hamilton =

American politician (born 1952)

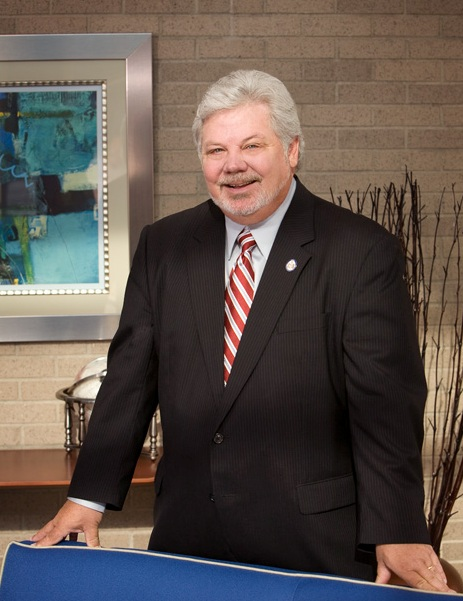

Member of the Virginia House of Delegates from the 93rd district
- In office December 1, 1988 – December 2009
- Preceded by: Everett Hogge
- Succeeded by: Robin Abbott

Personal details
- Born: April 9, 1952 (age 74) Richmond, Virginia, U.S.
- Party: Republican
- Children: 2
- Education: University of Richmond; College of William and Mary
- Profession: School administrator
- Committees: Health, Welfare and Institutions (chair); Appropriations (vice-chair); Education

Phillip A. Hamilton (born April 9, 1952) is a former Virginia Republican Party politician. A member of the Virginia House of Delegates from 1988 until his resignation in 2009, he represented the 93rd district on the Virginia Peninsula, made up of parts of James City County and the city of Newport News.

Hamilton was convicted and sentenced by a U.S. district court jury to 9 1/2 years in prison for federal bribery and extortion charges in August 2011 for soliciting employees of Old Dominion University for a paid position in exchange for a legislative budget amendment that included funding for the position. He was ordered to begin serving his sentence in September 2011. Hamilton was released from federal prison after completing his sentence on October 22, 2019.

== Biography ==
Hamilton, a native Virginian, served as a senior member of the Virginia House of Delegates. He represented the 93rd District, which comprises portions of the City of Newport News and James City County. Divorced with two grown children, Hamilton has lived in the 93rd district since its creation as a single member district in the early 1980s.

Hamilton graduated from Warwick High School in 1970 and the University of Richmond in 1974. After college, Hamilton began teaching for the Newport News Public Schools. While teaching full-time, he earned graduate degrees in Educational Administration from the College of William & Mary. In 1984, Hamilton became an Assistant Principal with the Newport News Public Schools. He is employed part-time by Newport News Public Schools as Coordinator of Professional Development.

In the General Assembly, Hamilton served as Chairman of the Health, Welfare, and Institutions Committee and was the second-ranking member on the Education Committee. As Vice-Chairman of the Appropriations Committee, Hamilton had a significant role in the budget process. In addition to having served as Chairman of the Health and Human Resources Subcommittee, Hamilton served on the Public Education and Public Safety Subcommittees and was one of the few legislators who served on the Budget Conference Committee, whose members negotiate the final version of Virginia's budget.

Prior to his bribery conviction, Virginia organizations named Hamilton as "Legislator of the Year" 12 times.

== ODU funding scandal, federal convictions and prison sentence ==
In August 2009 Virginia newspapers obtained emails which revealed Hamilton expected to be hired by Old Dominion University (ODU) in return for procuring public funding for a new teacher training center. The General Assembly went on to give the center $500,000 a year in state funding, and ODU, in turn, gave Hamilton a $40,000 a year job as an independent contractor. Once the emails were made public Hamilton and ODU immediately severed ties.

On September 17, ODU released an internal audit on the Hamilton hiring. The audit found that Hamilton's invoices had "no details of services rendered" and that his office was "only lightly used in the beginning and then later not at all." Regarding ODU, the audit concluded the school suffered from a lack of internal control and failed to follow its own policies and procedures.

Hamilton was sentenced on August 12, 2011 to 9 1/2 years in prison by a U.S. district jury after a conviction in May of one count of federal program bribery and one count of extortion under color of official right for what was found to be criminal solicitation of Old Dominion University employees for the ODU contractor position, a coerced quid pro quo for a legislative budget amendment to fund the position and the training center that Hamilton had introduced in the Virginia legislature. The Court ordered him to surrender to authorities by September 19, 2011 and to serve two additional years of supervised release following his 114-month prison term.

Prosecutors said Hamilton is the first elected Virginia legislator to be convicted of selling his position for personal gain. In August 2016, he and former Democratic Congressmen Chaka Fattah of Philadelphia, Pennsylvania became two of the first people convicted of public corruption to try to take advantage of the U.S. Supreme Court's ruling in the case involving former Republican Virginia Governor Bob McDonnell. Hamilton, representing himself, petitioned the Fourth Circuit Court of Appeals for relief.

In May 2013, a man was charged with attempting to defraud Hamilton's former wife Roxanne Burnette of more than $20,000 by claiming that he was working on obtaining a presidential pardon for Hamilton.
