= White Top Folk Festival =

- Genre: Folk, Old-time
- Dates: August
- Location: Whitetop Mountain
- Years active: 1931-1936, 1938, 1939
- Founders: Annabel Morris Buchanan, John Blakemore, John Powell

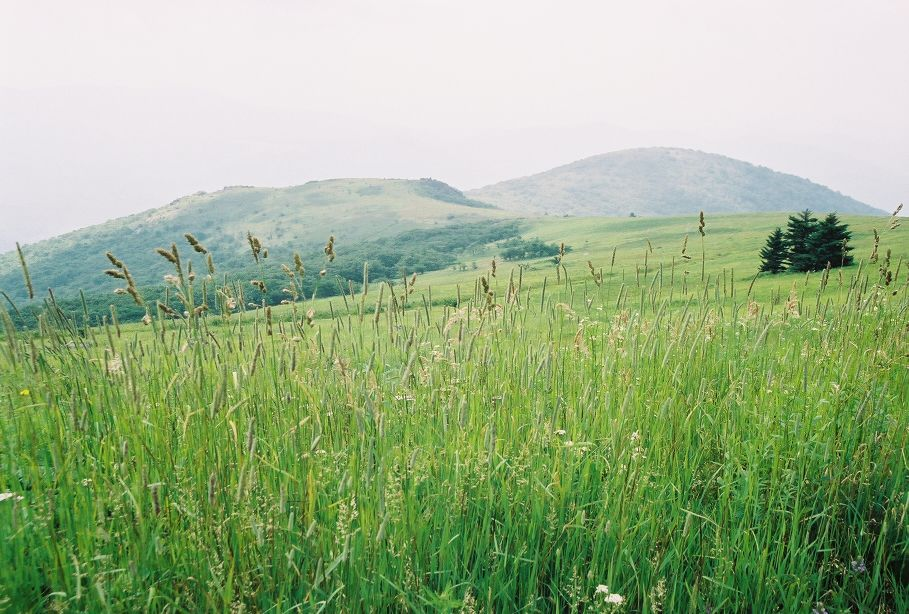
A view on Whitetop Mountain

The White Top Folk Festival was a folk festival held on Whitetop Mountain in Grayson County, Virginia from 1931 to 1939. Established by Annabel Morris Buchanan, John Blakemore, and classical musician John Powell, it featured Appalachian folk music. At its height, the festival hosted First Lady Eleanor Roosevelt in 1933. The festival was not held in 1937, and was canceled in 1940 due to flooding. It did not resume again.

== Early years ==
The idea for the festival came to John Blakemore after a local musician suggested holding a Fourth of July fiddler's contest on Whitetop Mountain. Blakemore mentioned it to his cousin, John Buchanan, who told his wife, Annabel. Annabel Buchanan, a musician and music teacher, had been putting on small music programs around Marion, Virginia, for several years. She discussed the idea with her friend, classical composer John Powell. Blakemore, Buchanan, and Powell began planning for a music festival that included more than the original idea of a fiddler's contest. They decided that they would consider only "old time" music and disallowed "modern songs, tunes, or dances." The first festival was scheduled for August 15, 1931.

The inaugural White Top Folk Festival drew around 3,000 spectators and hosted around three dozen musicians and groups. The musicians competed for monetary prizes, which were especially attractive during the Depression days. The 1932 festival was similar in format but slightly larger and stretched over two days. It included handicraft exhibits, square dances, and a winner's program. Nearly 4,000 people attended to watch over 75 individual and group performers.

== Expansion ==
In 1933, First Lady Eleanor Roosevelt wrote to Buchanan expressing interest in attending the festival. Blakemore, who was politically powerful in the area, had the roads to the festival expanded in anticipation of the crowds Roosevelt's visit would draw. More than 12,000 people attended the festival in 1933.

The festival grew increasingly elaborate and culturally significant, with attendance and attention from academic folklorists, musicologists, and journalists. By 1936, a 10-day White Top Folk Conference was held at Marion College before the festival opening.

== Last years ==
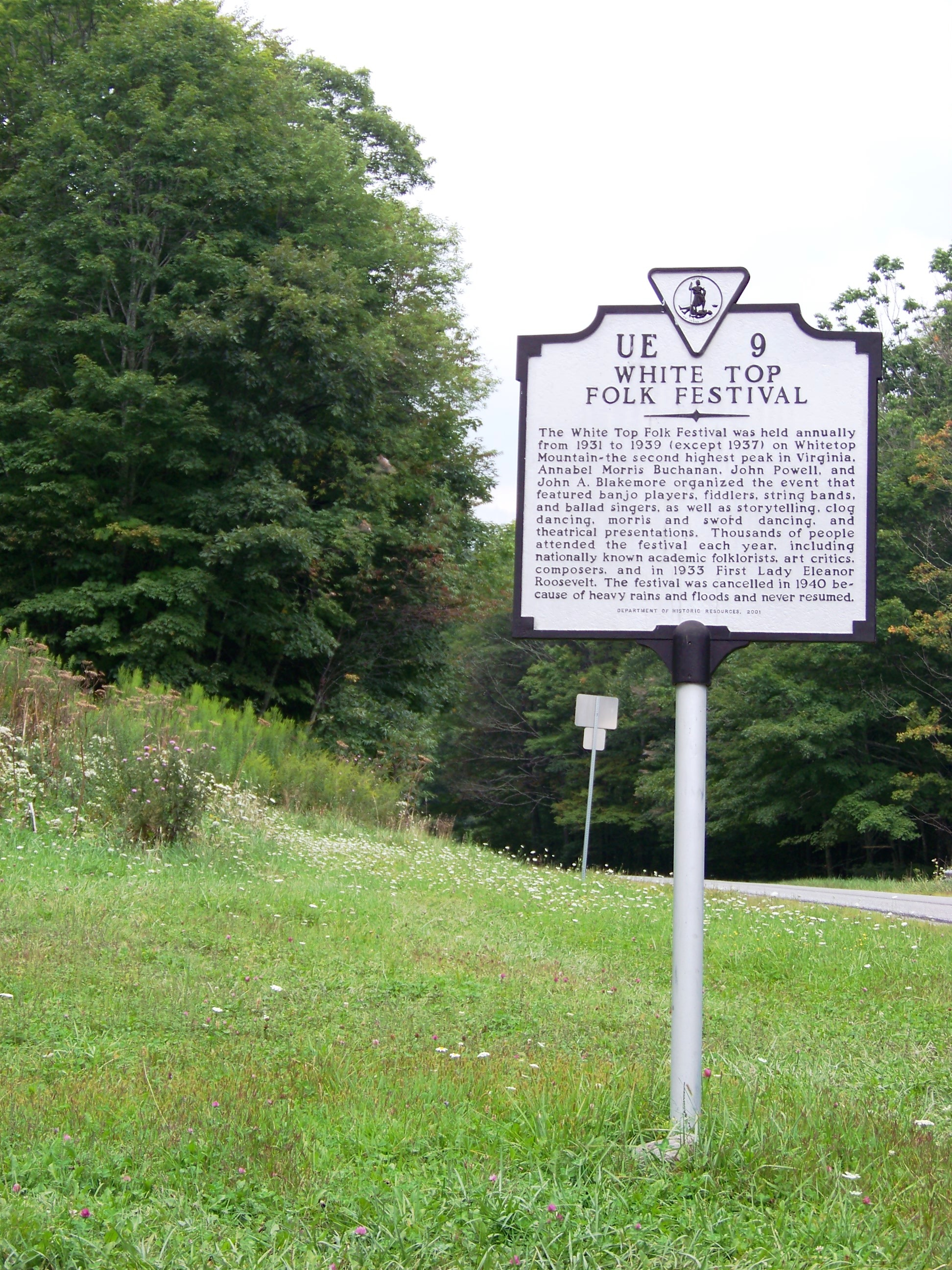
Historical marker detailing the story of the folk festival

Problems began surfacing after the second festival. Tension grew between the founders, who had conflicting values and agendas. Blakemore was eager to exploit the commercial opportunities that accompanied the festival's expansion. He proposed opening a folk school that might serve as a tax shelter for the White Top Company, the corporation that owned Whitetop Mountain and of which he was the principal stockholder. Buchanan was furious that Blakemore was using the festival for private enrichment, and she finally left the festival in 1937.

Even as it garnered appreciation from academics and cultural critics, the festival drew criticism for its contradictory treatment of poor festival-goers and black people. Charles Seeger, who attended the 1936 festival, noted that many poverty-stricken spectators had to stand outside the performance pavilion because they could not afford to pay to sit on the shaded benches inside. Black people were prohibited from attending or performing at White Top, and exceptions were made only for the servants who accompanied Eleanor Roosevelt during her 1933 visit.
