= Timmy French =

American politician from Virginia

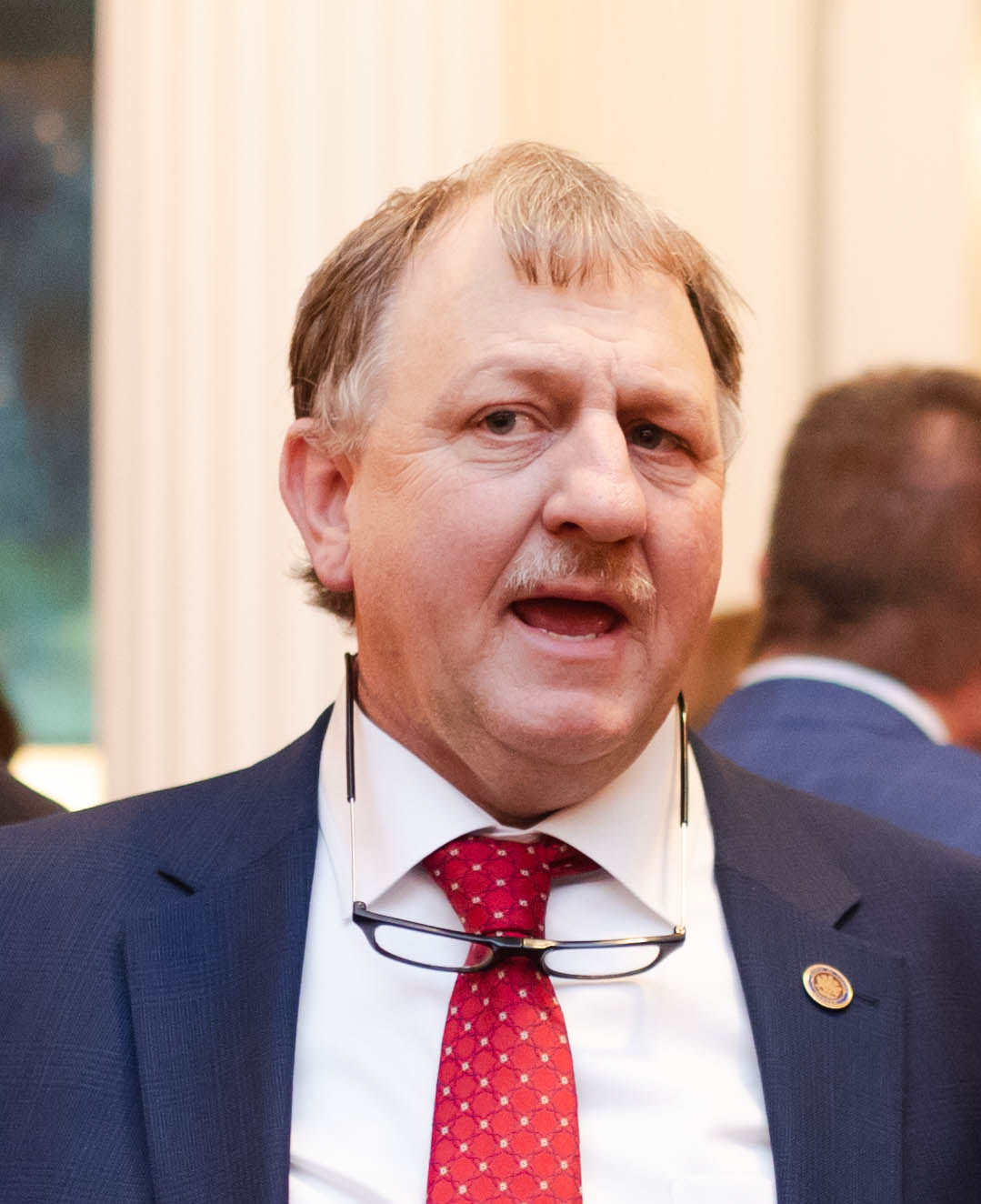

Member of the Virginia Senate from the 1st district
- Incumbent
- Assumed office January 10, 2024
- Preceded by: Mark Obenshain & Jill Vogel (redistricting)

Personal details
- Born: August 23, 1969 (age 56) Woodstock, Virginia, U.S.
- Party: Republican
- Occupation: Farmer
- Website: www.timmyfrench.com

Timmy French is an American Republican politician from Virginia. He was elected to the Virginia Senate in the 2023 Virginia Senate election from the 1st district.

Senate of Virginia
Preceded by Monty Mason	Member of the Virginia Senate from the 1st district 2024–Present	Incumbent
