= David C. Cummings Jr. =

American politician

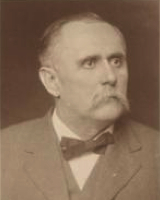
- Portrait of Cummings, circa 1912

Member of the Virginia Senate from the 1st district
- In office January 10, 1912 – April 24, 1913
- Preceded by: Alanson T. Lincoln
- Succeeded by: Benjamin F. Buchanan

Personal details
- Born: June 23, 1861 Abingdon, Virginia, U.S.
- Died: April 24, 1913 (aged 51) Abingdon, Virginia, U.S.
- Party: Democratic

David Campbell Cummings Jr. (June 23, 1861 – April 24, 1913) was an American Democratic politician who served as a member of the Virginia Senate, representing the state's 1st district. He was elected in 1911, defeating incumbent Republican Alanson T. Lincoln.

Senate of Virginia
Preceded by Alanson T. Lincoln	Virginia Senator for the 1st District; 1912–1913	Succeeded by Benjamin F. Buchanan
