= Virginia's 93rd House of Delegates district =

Virginia legislative district

District map from the 2023 election

Virginia's 93rd House of Delegates district elects one of the 100 members of the Virginia House of Delegates, the lower house of the state's bicameral legislature. The district is made up of eastern parts of Norfolk, Virginia.

The district was most recently represented by Democrat Jackie Glass.

== District officeholders ==
Years	Delegate	Party	Electoral history
January 12, 1983 – January 13, 1988	Ted Morrison	Democratic	Did not seek reelection
January 13, 1988 – April 4, 1988	Everett Hogge	Republican	Died
December 1, 1988 – December 2009	Phil Hamilton	Republican	Resigned; Convicted of bribery and sent to 9 1/2 years in prison in 2011
January 13, 2010 – January 2012	Robin Abbott	Democratic	Defeated in bid for reelection
January 2012 – January 8, 2014	Michael B. Watson	Republican	Defeated in bid for reelection
January 8, 2014 – November 2016	Monty Mason	Democratic	Declined to seek reelection; Elected to the Virginia State Senate
November 2016 – November 7, 2023	Michael P. Mullin	Democratic	Did not seek re-election; resigned early to begin new employment
November 7, 2023 - present	Jackie Glass	Democratic	Replaced Michael Mullin after he retired
