= Alanson T. Lincoln =

American politician (1858–1925)

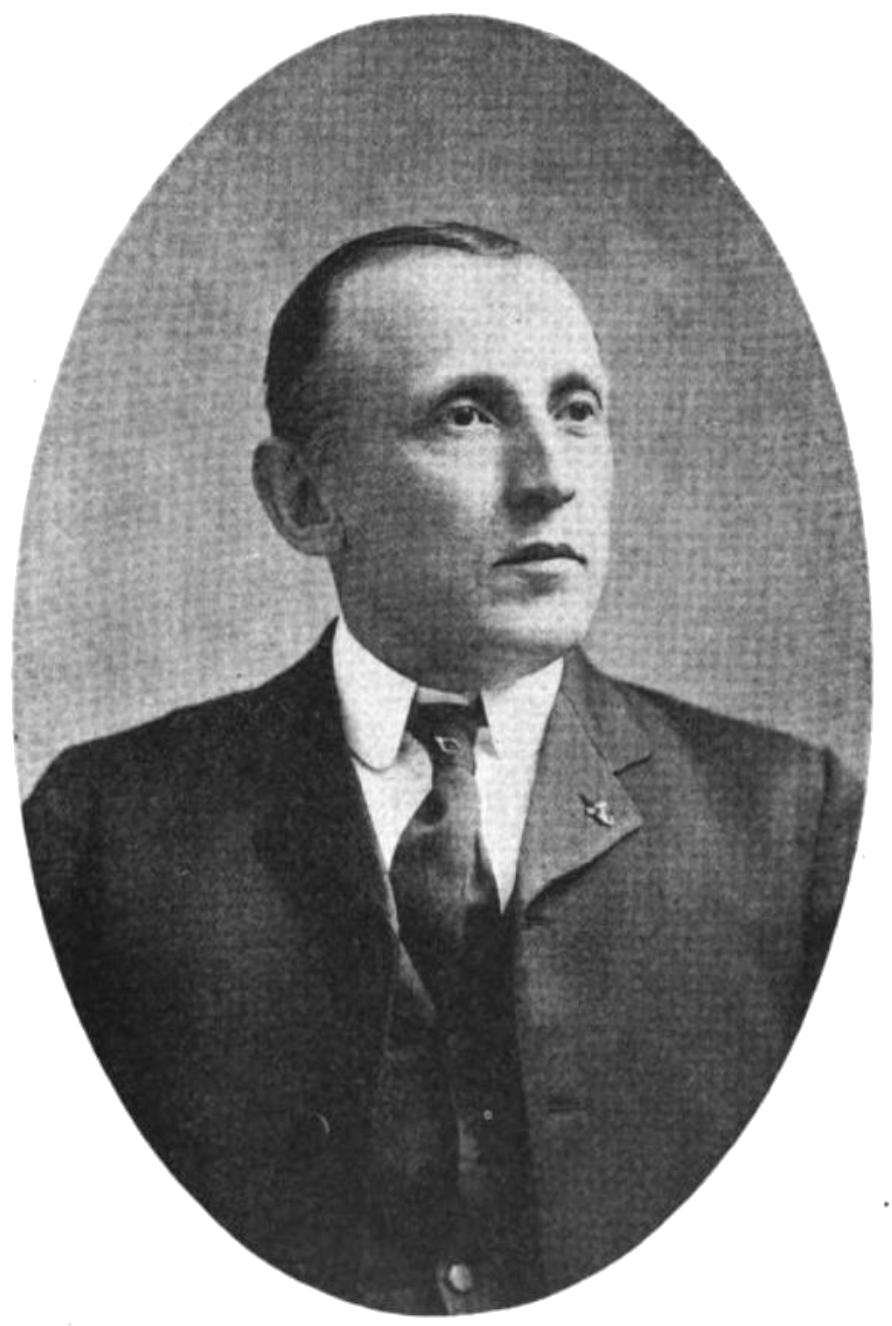

Member of the Virginia House of Delegates from Smyth County
- In office January 14, 1914 – January 12, 1916
- Preceded by: Jacob H. Wissler
- Succeeded by: Hezekiah L. Bonham

Member of the Virginia Senate from the 1st district
- In office January 10, 1906 – January 10, 1912
- Preceded by: J. Cloyd Byars
- Succeeded by: David C. Cummings Jr.

Personal details
- Born: Alanson Tilman Lincoln; October 23, 1858 Rich Valley, Virginia, U.S.
- Died: January 28, 1925 (aged 66) Abingdon, Virginia, U.S.
- Party: Republican
- Spouse: Lucretia Sexton
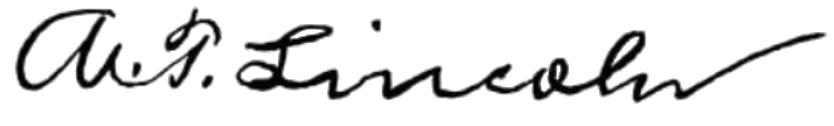
- Signature

Alanson Tilman Lincoln (October 23, 1858 – January 28, 1925) was an American Republican politician who served as a member of the Virginia Senate. He also represented Smythe and Bland Counties at the Virginia Constitutional Convention of 1902.

He was defeated for reelection to the Senate in 1911 by Democrat David C. Cummings Jr., after which he was elected to a term in the Virginia House of Delegates.

Senate of Virginia
Preceded by J. Cloyd Byars	Virginia Senator for the 1st District; 1906–1912	Succeeded by David C. Cummings, Jr.
Virginia House of Delegates
Preceded by J. H. Wissler	Virginia Delegate for Smyth County; 1914–1916	Succeeded by Hezekiah L. Bonham
