= Robin Abbott =

American politician

Member of the Virginia House of Delegates from the 93rd district
- In office January 13, 2010 – January 2012
- Preceded by: Phillip A. Hamilton
- Succeeded by: Michael B. Watson

Personal details
- Born: January 20, 1953 (age 73) Orlando, Florida
- Party: Democratic
- Spouse: Gary Lee Abbott
- Education: Christopher Newport University; William & Mary Law School
- Profession: Attorney

Robin A. Abbott (born January 20, 1953, in Orlando, Florida) is an American politician, consumer rights advocate, and attorney. A Democrat, she served in the Virginia House of Delegates 2010–2012, representing the 93rd district in Newport News and James City County on the Virginia Peninsula. She won the seat in the 2009 elections by defeating Republican incumbent Philip A. Hamilton; it was one of the two Democratic pickups that year.

== Biography ==
After graduating from high school in 1970, Abbott moved to Washington, D.C., and worked for the Federal Bureau of Investigation as a stenographer and the United States Department of Justice as a legal secretary. She worked as a paralegal for over 25 years, later enrolling simultaneously at Thomas Nelson Community College (TNCC) and Christopher Newport University. She graduated from TNCC, magna cum laude, in 1997, with an Associates of Arts degree. She graduated from Christopher Newport University, magna cum laude, in 1998, with a Bachelor of Science degree in governmental administration. She later graduated from the College of William and Mary School of Law, and was admitted to the Virginia State Bar.

Abbott was elected as a representative for the 93rd District, Newport News and James City County, in the Virginia House of Delegates of the General Assembly in November 2009. She is a consumer advocate and attorney who has lived in Newport News for over two decades and is a partner in the law firm Consumer Litigation Associates, P.C. with offices in Newport News and Fairfax. She is married to Gary Abbott and has four children.

Abbott is a member of the National Association of Consumer Advocates (NACA) and in that capacity has fought against mortgage lenders in foreclosure cases. She has served as a speaker/panelist at State and National Seminars and consumer law courses. A large part of her law practice has been the representation of enlisted service members in Hampton Roads and she has also taught Navy and Army JAG consumer law programs.

Abbott worked as a Member of the Legal Poll Monitor Team for the 2008 Presidential Election on behalf of the Obama Campaign, served as an Officer and Youth Coordinator for the Peninsula Chapter of Operation Smile, served as Chairman of the Fat Tire Duathlon and co-chairman of the Strawberry Jam Festival, collectively raising over $1M benefiting Operation Smile. She served on the Board of Thomas Nelson Community College from 2007 to 2009 and served on the Board of The Hampton Newport News Community Services Board from 2007 to November 2009. She is an active member of Our Lady of Mount Carmel Catholic Church in Newport News, Virginia, where she serves as a Eucharist Minister and assists in many other ministries benefiting her community. Most recently Robin was awarded the Dana B. Hamel Award by Thomas Nelson Community College for her support of higher education.
