= George W. LeCato =

American politician

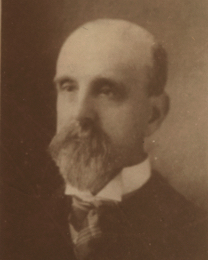

Member of the Virginia Senate from the 37th district
- In office December 6, 1893 – March 12, 1903
- Preceded by: John W. G. Blackstone
- Succeeded by: Ben T. Gunter

Personal details
- Born: George Washington LeCato; August 1, 1842 Accomac, Virginia, U.S.
- Died: March 12, 1903 (aged 60) Richmond, Virginia, U.S.
- Party: Democratic
- Spouse: Mary Ames
- Education: Dickinson College; University of Maryland
- Occupation: Physician; politician

Military service
- Allegiance: Confederate States
- Branch/service: Confederate States Army
- Unit: 39th Virginia Infantry
- Battles/wars: American Civil War

George Washington LeCato (August 1, 1842 – March 12, 1903) was an American politician who served as a member of the Virginia Senate.

Senate of Virginia
Preceded by John W. G. Blackstone	Virginia Senator for the 37th District; 1893–1903	Succeeded by Ben T. Gunter
