= Christopher Newport University =

Public university in Newport News, Virginia, US

- Former name: Christopher Newport College (1960–1992)
- Motto: "Students Come First"
- Type: Public university
- Established: November 12, 1960; 66 years ago
- Accreditation: SACS
- Academic affiliations: SCHEV
- Endowment: $57.2 million (2025)
- President: William G. Kelly
- Provost: Quentin Kidd
- Faculty: 283
- Students: 4,454 (fall 2024)
- Undergraduates: 4,369
- Postgraduates: 85
- Location: Newport News, Virginia, United States; 37°03′47″N 76°29′35″W
- Campus: 260 acres (1.1 km^{2}); Midsize city
- Newspaper: The Captain's Log
- Colors: Royal Blue; Grey
- Nickname: Captains
- Sporting affiliations: NCAA Division III – C2C; NJAC; CLC; USASC; MAISA
- Mascot: Captain Chris
- Website: www.cnu.edu

Christopher Newport University (CNU) is a public university in Newport News, Virginia, United States. It was founded in 1960 as Christopher Newport College, an extension school of the College of William and Mary for mid-career working professionals, members of the military, and non-traditional students in and around the Newport News area of the Hampton Roads region. The university has since expanded into a residential college for traditional students.

It is named after Christopher Newport, captain of one of the ships which carried settlers of Jamestown, the first permanent English settlement in North America.

== History ==
In 1960, the city of Newport News joined with the Commonwealth of Virginia to create Christopher Newport College (CNC), which opened its doors in 1961 and at the time was located in the old John W. Daniel School building. The college was founded as an extension of the College of William & Mary and offered extension courses that had already been available in the area for some time.

In 1964, the college was moved to its current location, a 75-acre (300,000 m^{2}) tract of land seized by the city via eminent domain. That same year, the college's first permanent building was dedicated as Christopher Newport Hall.

The site chosen was very controversial. Since at least the early 1900s, it had been home to an African-American community that had, over time, prospered and grown more middle-class. In the 1950s and 1960s, white city leaders used eminent domain to seize stable Black neighborhoods for whites-only schools three times. As a local Black surgeon wrote to the local Daily Press newspaper: "Does it not seem more than coincidental that, with the hundreds of undeveloped acres in the city, the sites recently chosen by the city for condemnation are sites owned by Negroes?"

The future site of CNC, known as Shoe Lane, was located adjacent to the whites-only James River Country Club, whose members included much of the city's powerful elite. At a council hearing on the proposed site, civil rights attorney W. Hale Thompson testified that the city's goal "was to eliminate the possibility of Negroes building homes in that area." University president Anthony Santoro later called the choice of the site an "egregious wrong" and said "the city has to own up to the fact that this was a deliberate attempt to get rid of a Black community, because there were many places that the school could have been built."

Originally, CNC was treated as an off-site department of William & Mary, and its chief executive was called a director. By 1970, the title had been changed to president. In 1971, CNC became a four-year college; however, it remained an extension of William & Mary until 1977 when it became an autonomous four-year institution. In 1992, CNC was granted university status under the leadership of its fourth president, Anthony R. Santoro, who oversaw the building of the first residence hall. In 1996, CNU made plans to become more competitive. Those plans included the expansion of university property, several new buildings, and residence halls, as well as overhauling academic programs and the admission process.

=== Presidents ===
- William G. Kelly, 2023–present
- Adelia Thompson (interim), 2022–2023
- Paul S. Trible Jr., 1996–2022
- Anthony Santoro, 1987–1996
- John E. Anderson, 1979–1987
- James C. Windsor, 1970–1979
- H. Wescott Cunningham, 1961–1970 (titled as director until c. 1969)

== Academics ==
=== Admissions ===
In 2022, U.S. News & World Report found that Christopher Newport University admissions were "selective" with an acceptance rate of 89%. For over a decade, the university has not required submission of SAT, ACT or CLT scores, but for the many students who still chose to submit scores, the middle 50% of applicants admitted had an SAT score between 1110 and 1320 or an ACT score between 25 and 29. There are minimum GPA and rank-in-class requirements for test-optional consideration, but the university uses a holistic review process in admissions that takes many other factors into consideration.

=== Rankings ===
For 2023–2024, U.S. News & World Report ranked Christopher Newport University among 136 Regional Universities in the South to be #7 overall, #43 for Best Value, #13 for Best Undergraduate Teaching, #109 in Top Performers on Social Mobility, and #3 in Top Public Schools.

In 2026, SmartAsset ranked Christopher Newport University #10 on its list of "America's Best Value Small Colleges and Universities".

=== Degrees and programs ===
Christopher Newport University offers a variety of four-year Bachelor of Science and Bachelor of Arts degrees. Graduate programs in applied physics and computer science, environmental science and teaching are also available in five-year bachelor's to master's, as well as traditional formats. Academic programs are offered through the College of Arts and Humanities, the College of Natural and Behavioral Sciences, and the College of Social Sciences, including the Joseph W. Luter III School of Business.

=== Joseph W. Luter III School of Business ===
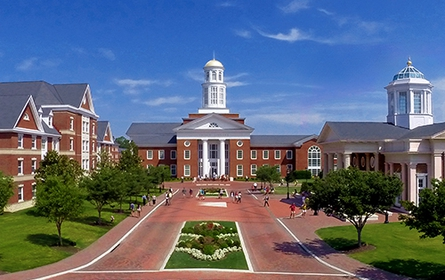
The entrance to Christopher Newport University, featuring the York River Hall freshman residence hall, the Trible Library, and the Pope Chapel.

The School of Business is accredited by the AACSB. The Luter School offers degrees in management, marketing, accounting, and finance, and includes a Masters in Financial Analysis program. Alan Witt, Class of 1976 graduate and former CEO of PBMares, was named dean of the Luter School of Business on August 17, 2021.

=== College of Arts and Humanities ===
CNU's College of Arts and Humanities includes the Departments of English, Fine Art and Art History, History, Modern and Classical Languages and Literatures, Music, Philosophy and Religion, and Theater and Dance.

==== Department of Fine Art and Art History ====
The Fine Art Department, located in the Mary M. Torggler Fine Art Center, offers a degree in fine arts with concentrations in art history and studio art.

==== Department of Theatre & Dance ====
The Theatre & Dance Department offers a degree in theater arts and a Bachelor of Music degree.

=== Army Reserve Officer Training Corps (ROTC) ===
The Army Reserve Officer Training Corps has maintained a presence at CNU for several years, offering classroom and field based training. The program is a sub-component of the College of William and Mary's ROTC program, known as the Revolutionary Guard Battalion, which commissions several new US Army second lieutenants each year.

== Athletics ==
CNU participates mainly in the NCAA Division III Coast to Coast Athletic Conference (C2C, which was known as the Capital Athletic Conference before November 2020), having moved from the USA South Athletic Conference in July 2013. Their athletic teams are known as the Captains. The football team participates in the New Jersey Athletic Conference (NJAC) due to the C2C not sponsoring football. CNU fields a wide variety of college level teams on the Division III level. The Freeman Center houses the basketball, volleyball, and indoor track teams, while the lacrosse, soccer, baseball, softball, and field hockey teams play at a complex called "Captain's Field." The football and outdoor track teams compete at TowneBank Stadium. Ratcliffe Hall was expanded in 2012 and now includes various athletic offices as well as the varsity gym. A sailing center is also located close to the campus along the James River.

Christopher Newport University's athletics have achieved notable milestones. The women's soccer program made history by clinching the school's first-ever NCAA Division III national championship on December 12, 2021. Following suit, the softball program secured their own NCAA Division III national championship on May 31, 2022. Both women's teams won national championships during the 2021–2022 academic year.

The men's basketball program captured the first national championship in a men's sport when it won the 2023 NCAA Division III national championship on March 18, 2023.

CNU sports club programs include ice hockey, equestrian, dressage, cycling, fishing, lacrosse, martial arts, rock climbing, rugby, scuba diving, silver storm dance, soccer, swimming, table tennis, tennis, ultimate frisbee, hurling, rowing, and volleyball.

=== Sports ===
- Baseball
- Cross country (men's and women's)
- Basketball (men's and women's)
- Cheerleading
- Field hockey
- American football
- Golf
- Lacrosse (men's and women's)
- Sailing
- Soccer (men's and women's)
- Softball
- Swimming
- Tennis (men's and women's)
- Track
- Volleyball

== Campus ==
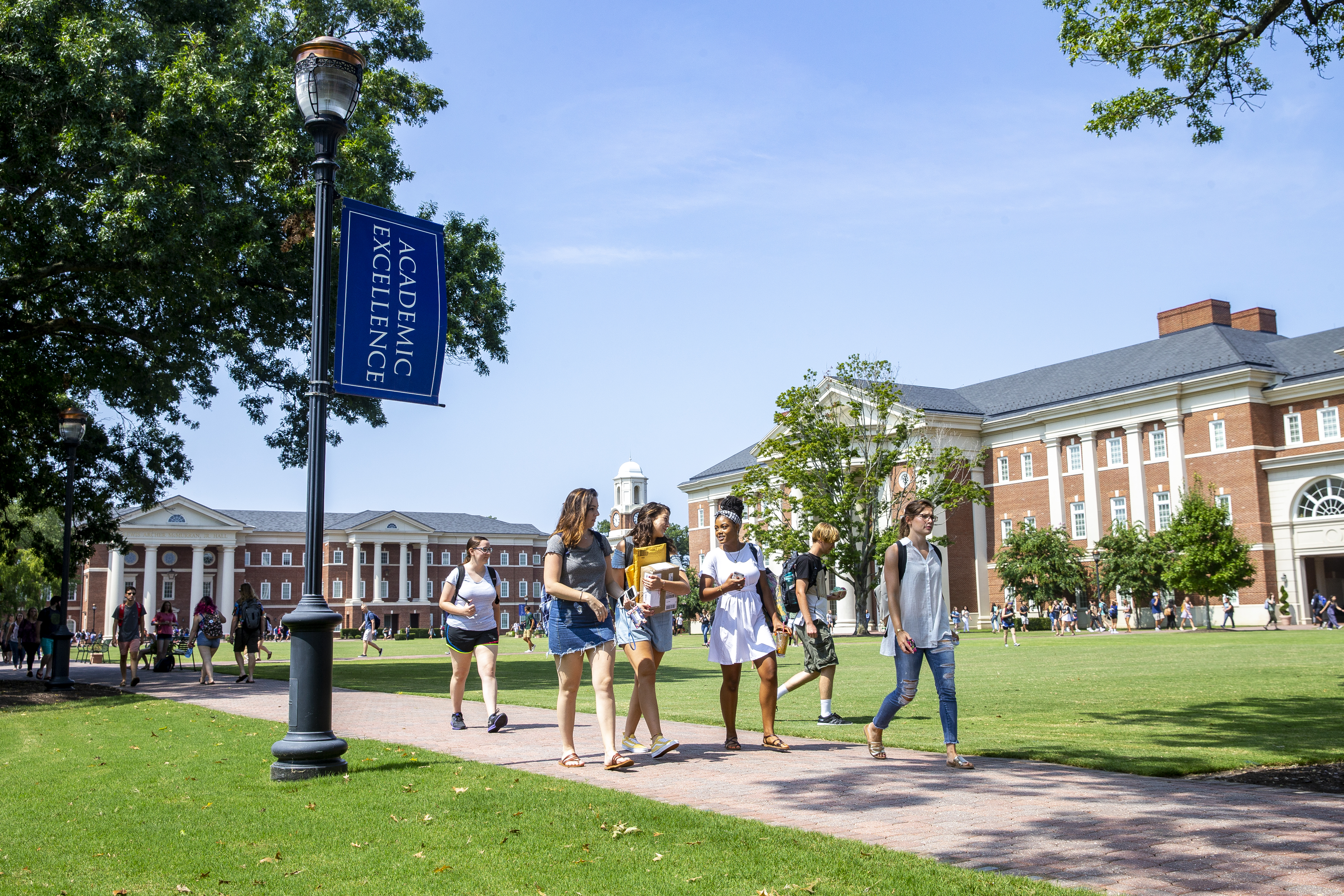
The Great Lawn of Christopher Newport University, featuring the McMurran and Forbes academic buildings.

=== Residence halls ===
Residence halls on campus are usually segregated into the class of student living in them. In the recent years, new policies have been enacted that require all freshman and sophomore students to live in an on campus housing facility, unless they live in the commuting zone. Starting with the class of 2014, all students must live on campus during the junior year in addition to their freshman and sophomore years.

=== David Student Union ===
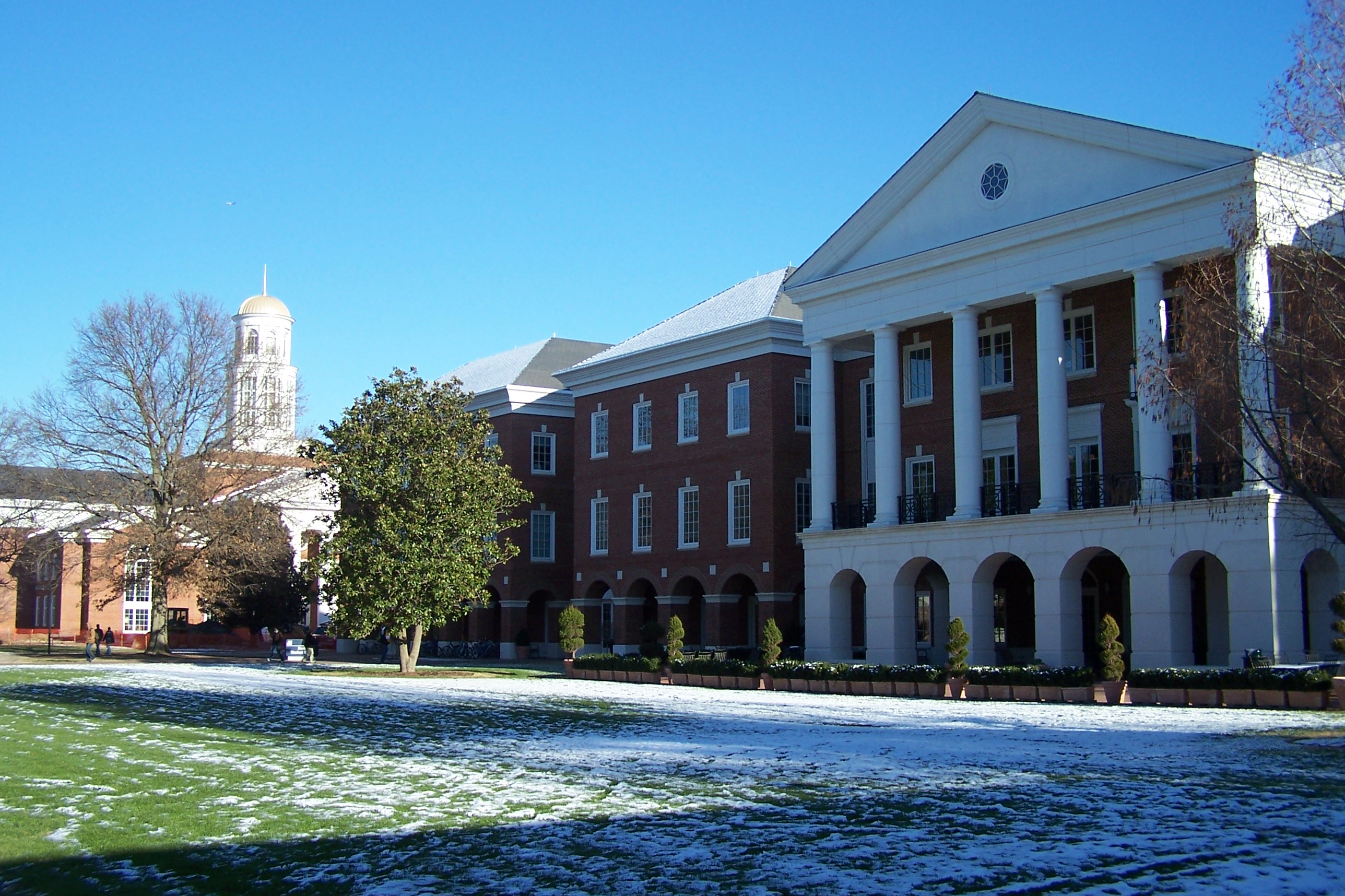
The David Student Union

The David Student Union (DSU) is a $36 million, 116,000-square-foot (10,800 m^{2}) facility whose construction began in 2003 and opened September 9, 2006. Constructed in a "Neo-Georgian" architectural style, the first floor contains the campus Convenience Store, parallel the DSU dining facilities: The Discovery Bistro, Discovery Cafe, Chick-fil-A, Discovery Pizza, and Regatta's. The campus Bookstore and Convenience Store closed during the Fall 2010 semester in favor of an online bookstore and instead contains a student lounge, admissions office, and apparel store. All on-campus students receive a mailbox and access to a full-service Post Office located on the second floor of the DSU. Four large conference rooms named for past U.S. Presidents are located around a central lobby area at the top of the steps. The Ballroom is also located on the second floor. The building provides offices for Student Life, The Captain's Log, Auxiliary Services, Study Abroad, and others. Private desks with computers are provided for students as well as quiet study sections and recreational areas. The building was named in honor of William R. and Goldie R. David.

=== Academic buildings ===
For the opening of the Spring 2010 semester, Christopher Newport University opened the Lewis Archer McMurran Jr. Hall. This building has neo-Georgian architecture. The building is 85,000 square feet and frames the university's Great Lawn on its western side. McMurran Hall houses the Departments of Modern and Classical Languages and Literatures, History, English, and Government. It has a 150-person lecture hall, two 50-person lecture halls, and over 25 other classrooms.

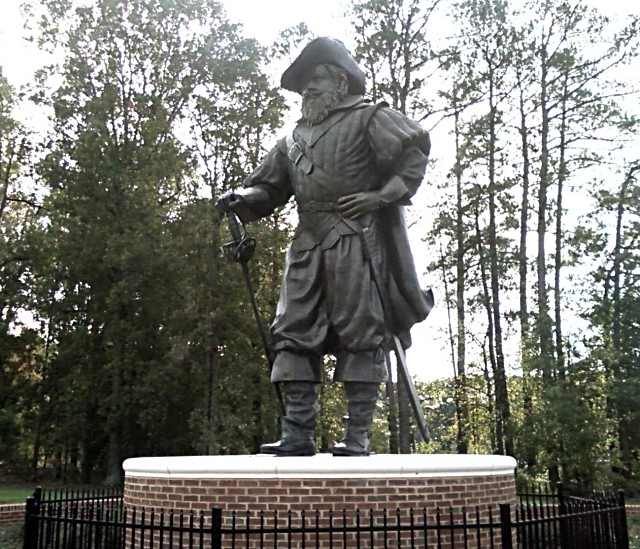
Statue of Sir Christopher Newport

To the north of McMurran Hall is Ratcliffe Hall, the former home of the Departments of English and Government. Once CNU's gymnasium, the building was renovated to include classroom and office space for students and faculty. Other academic buildings on campus include Gosnold Hall, Forbes Hall, and the Business and Technology Center (BTC Building), located across Prince Drew Lane. The Ferguson Center for the Arts is home to the Departments of Music and Theater & Dance. The most recent addition to the academic buildings is the Mary M. Torggler Fine Arts Center, which became home to the Department of Fine Art and Art History upon its opening in 2021.

Wingfield Hall, the former home of the Departments of Psychology and Language, was demolished in 2011 to make way for the Joseph W. Luter Hall, home of the school of business.

The Joseph W. Luter III Hall is the house of the Luter School of Business. The building, following the Neo-Georgian architecture of surrounding new structures, has a new 100-seat tiered lecture hall, 14 traditional classrooms, teachings labs, research labs and faculty offices.

The Mary Brock Forbes Integrated Science Building is a 156,000-square-foot (14,500 m^{2}) academic hall situated on the north edge of the great lawn, and houses the College of Natural and Behavioral Science as well as the Biology, Chemistry, Environmental Science and Psychology departments. It also includes spaces for students to interact, 50 faculty offices, a large lecture hall, 50 classrooms, and research labs.

=== Paul and Rosemary Trible Library ===
The university's library, renamed for Rosemary and Paul S. Trible Jr., had a multimillion-dollar addition completed in early 2008. The new

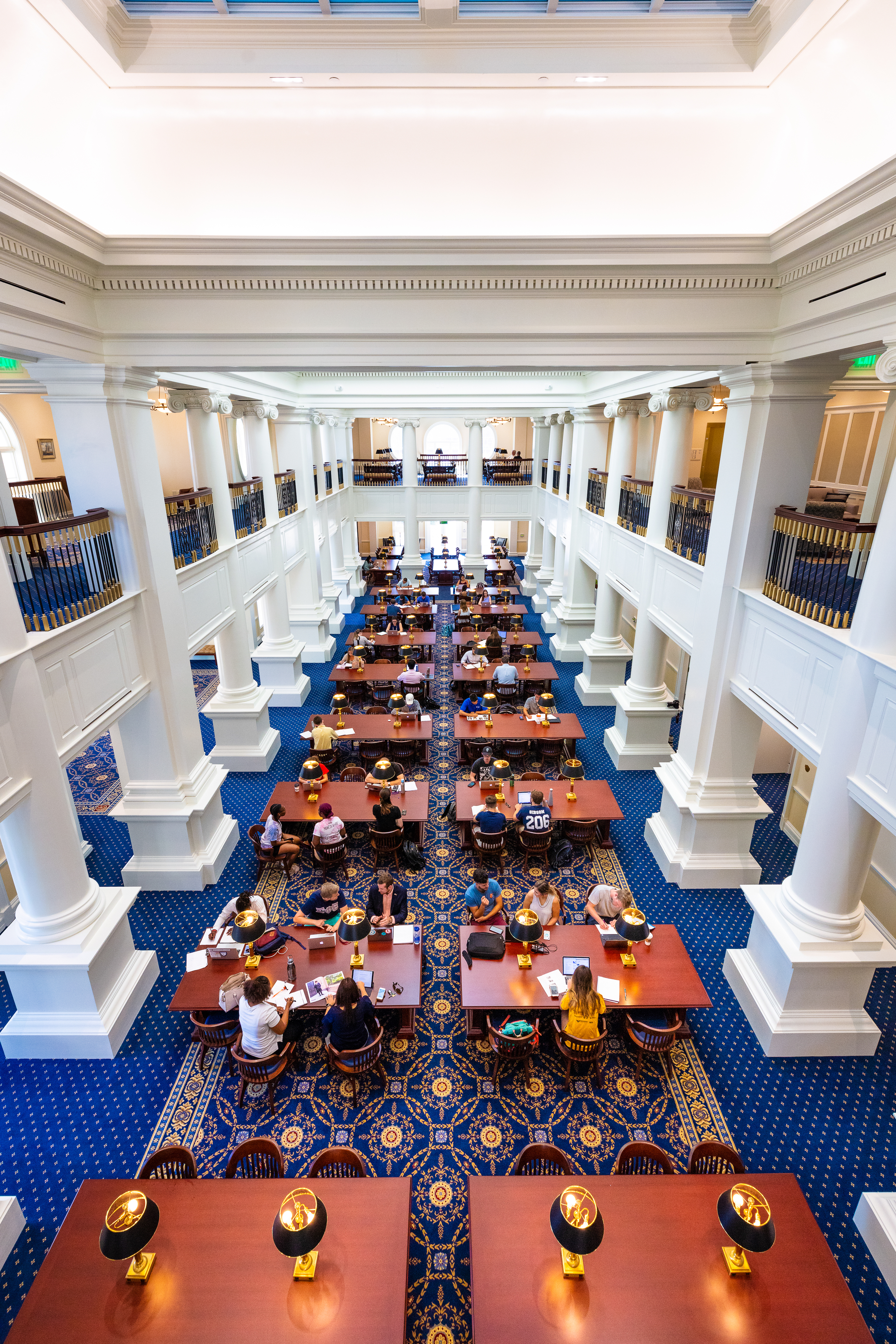
The Paul and Rosemary Trible Library reading room

110,000-square-foot (10,000 m^{2}) facility houses most of its collection in the original section. The new library was dedicated January 24, 2008, and fully opened at the start of the Spring 2008 semester. The Trible Library boasts a new Einstein's Cafe, a 24-hour study lounge, and an IT help desk.

In early 2009, the Mariners' Museum Library relocated to the Trible Library, providing students and the community with convenient access to the largest maritime history collection in the Western Hemisphere. The Paul and Rosemary Trible Library expanded beginning in 2016 to add another floor to the back portion of the facility. Due to the renovations, the Mariners' Museum Library moved back to the Mariners' Museum and reopened in Fall 2017.

In August 2018, the library expansion opened adding 3 floors of new space. Additions included a 100-seat theater, expanded Media Center, a two-story reading room, and 44 group study rooms.

=== Ferguson Center for the Arts ===
In 1996 the university acquired the Ferguson High School building and property, which was adjacent to campus. This building was used for classrooms until it was extensively renovated to become the Ferguson Center for the Arts, which opened in fall of 2005. Many features of the original high school, which was located between what is now the concert hall and the music and theatre hall, can still be seen throughout the current building. It houses a 1,725-seat concert hall which is acoustically engineered so that anyone on stage can be heard from any seat without a microphone, A 453-seat music and theatre hall, and a 200-seat studio theatre. It also contains two art galleries, a dance studio, and several classrooms.

=== Mary M. Torggler Fine Arts Center ===
First open in fall 2021, the Mary M. Torggler Fine Arts Center serves not only as Christopher Newport University's Department of Fine Art and Art History academic building, but also as a fine arts center for the surrounding area of Hampton Roads, Virginia. According to their website, the Torggler Center, "seeks to enrich the cultural landscape of the commonwealth of Virginia by presenting exceptional visual arts programming that empowers creative expression, critical thinking, lifelong learning and cultural dialogue". The Torggler Center hosts rotating exhibitions, community classes, university classes, and alumni centered galleries.

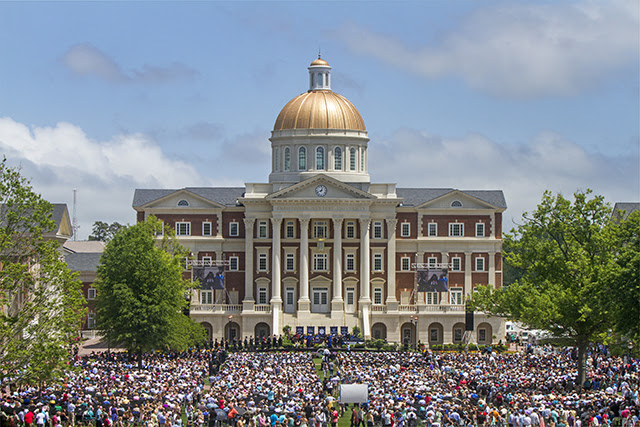
Christopher Newport Hall during the May 2015 commencement ceremony.

=== Pope Chapel ===
Opened in early 2013, the Pope Chapel, named for Larry Pope of Smithfield Foods, is a 14,000-square-foot (1,300 m^{2}) gathering place for various on campus religious organizations located at the campus entrance across from York River Hall and the Trible Library.

=== Christopher Newport Hall ===
In the fall of 2015 a new administration building was opened and named Christopher Newport Hall. The 81,000-square-foot (7,500 m^{2}) structure houses the Office of Admission, Office of the Registrar, Financial Aid, Housing, the Center for Academic Success, the President's Leadership Program and the Center for Career Planning, among others. The $42 million facility serves as a new landmark on campus and is at the head of the Great Lawn opposite Lewis Archer McMurran Jr. Hall. In May 2015, towards the end of construction, Newport Hall served as the backdrop for commencement ceremonies.

== Student life ==
Undergraduate demographics as of Fall 2023
Race and ethnicity	Total
White	72%
Black	9%
Hispanic	8%
Two or more races	5%
Asian	4%
Unknown	1%
Economic diversity
Low-income (Note: The percentage of students who received an income-based federal Pell grant intended for low-income students.)	15%
Affluent (Note: The percentage of students who are a part of the American middle class at the bare minimum.)	85%

=== The Captain's Log ===
The Captain's Log is a student-run organization that acts as the official newspaper of Christopher Newport University.

=== Currents ===
Currents is CNU's completely student-run literary magazine. Students from all disciplines may submit poetry, fiction, creative non-fiction, playwriting, and lyrics. Currents is also CNU's oldest on-campus organization.

=== WCNU Radio ===
WCNU Radio is a student-run, non-commercial, web-based radio station.

== Notable people ==
=== Alumni ===
- Robin Abbott (BA '98), former Virginia House of Delegates Representative for the 93rd District.
- C9 Meteos (William Hartman), professional League of Legends player—did not graduate
- Michael Caro (BA '08), soccer player
- Shirley Cooper (BA '64), former Virginia House of Delegates Representative for the 96th District.
- Colleen Doran, comic writer and artist
- Gary Hudson, actor
- Cassidy Hutchinson (BA '19), former White House aide and assistant to former U.S. President Donald Trump's White House Chief of Staff Mark Meadows.
- Karen Jackson (BA '87), former Virginia Secretary of Technology
- Michael P. Mullin (BA '04), Virginia House of Delegates Representative for the 93rd District.
- Randall Munroe (BS '06), creator of xkcd.
- Jesse Pippy (BA '04), Maryland House of Delegates Representative for the 4th District.
- Melanie Rapp (BA '90), Virginia House of Delegates Representative for the 96th District.
- Mojo Rawley (AS '05), former NFL Player for the Green Bay Packers and Arizona Cardinals, former WWE superstar.
- Chris Richardson, American Idol finalist
- Sam Ruby (BA '82), software engineer
- William Lamont Strothers (BA '91), NBA player, Portland Trail Blazers, Dallas Mavericks
- Kaitlyn Vincie (BA '10), sports presenter and journalist.
- Jeion Ward (BA '95), Virginia House of Delegates Representative for the 92nd District.
- Kezia Williams (BA '04), founder of The Black upStart

=== Faculty ===
- Jeffrey Bergner, former Assistant Secretary of State for Legislative Affairs
- William C. Mims, former senior justice on the Supreme Court of Virginia.
- Seth Roland (born 1957), soccer player and coach

== Sources ==
- Quarstein, John V.; Rouse, Parke S. Jr. (1996). Finneran, Elisa F. (ed.). Newport News: A Centennial History. Conner, Edward A. (1st ed.). Newport News, Virginia: City of Newport News. LCCN 96-71877. OCLC 36378085.
