= John Preston Buchanan =

American politician

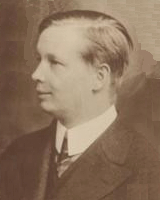
- Portrait of Buchanan, circa 1916

Member of the Virginia Senate from the 1st district
- In office January 12, 1916 – January 14, 1920
- Preceded by: B. F. Buchanan
- Succeeded by: John H. Hassinger

Personal details
- Born: John Preston Buchanan; January 30, 1888 Marion, Virginia, U.S.
- Died: September 15, 1937 (aged 49) Marion, Virginia, U.S.
- Party: Democratic
- Spouse: Annabel Morris (m. 1912)
- Parent: B. F. Buchanan (father)
- Education: Virginia Military Institute; Washington & Lee University; University of Virginia

John Preston Buchanan (January 30, 1888 – September 15, 1937) was an American politician who served as a member of the Virginia Senate, representing the state's 1st district.

Buchanan succeeded his father, Benjamin Franklin Buchanan, who would go on to become Lieutenant Governor of Virginia. After one term in office, he was defeated for reelection.

== Early life and education ==
Buchanan was born in the town of Marion in Smyth County, Virginia on January 30, 1888. He was the first of seven children for Benjamin Franklin Buchanan, a politically active local attorney, and his wife, Eleanor Fairman Buchanan (née Sheffey).

After high school, Buchanan attended Washington and Lee University. He received his law degree from the University of Virginia.

== Political career ==
A Democrat, Buchanan defeated Republican Robert A. Anderson in 1915 to serve as a senator during the 1916 General Assembly; the seat was occupied by his father in the previous session. His constituency was composed of Washington County, Smyth County, and the City of Bristol.

== Personal life ==
Buchanan married Annabel Morris on August 14, 1912 in Salem, Virginia. The couple had four children, Eleanor, John, Jr., Annabel and Patrick.

Senate of Virginia
Preceded by Benjamin F. Buchanan	Virginia Senator for the 1st District; 1916–1920	Succeeded by John H. Hassinger
