= Ben T. Gunter Jr. =

American politician (1902–1980)

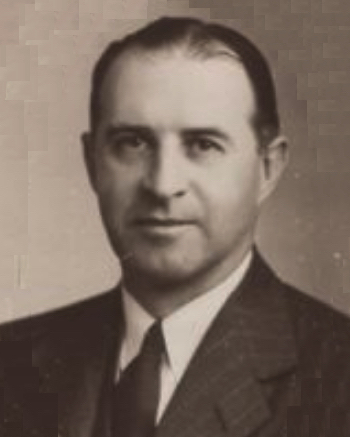
- Official portrait, 1948

Member of the Virginia Senate from the 1st district
- In office January 12, 1944 – January 9, 1952
- Preceded by: Jefferson F. Walter
- Succeeded by: V. Alfred Etheridge

Personal details
- Born: Benjamin Thomas Gunter Jr. August 6, 1902 Accomac, Virginia, U.S.
- Died: March 8, 1980 (aged 77) Accomack, Virginia, U.S.
- Party: Democratic
- Spouse: Margaret Harris Allen
- Parent: Ben T. Gunter (father)
- Education: University of Richmond
- Occupation: Lawyer; politician

Benjamin Thomas Gunter Jr. (August 6, 1902 – March 8, 1980) was an American politician who served as a member of the Virginia Senate.

His father, Ben T. Gunter served in the Senate from 1903 to 1912.

Senate of Virginia
Preceded by Jefferson F. Walter	Virginia Senator for the 1st District; 1944–1952	Succeeded by V. Alfred Etheridge
