= Ben T. Gunter =

American politician (1865–1939)

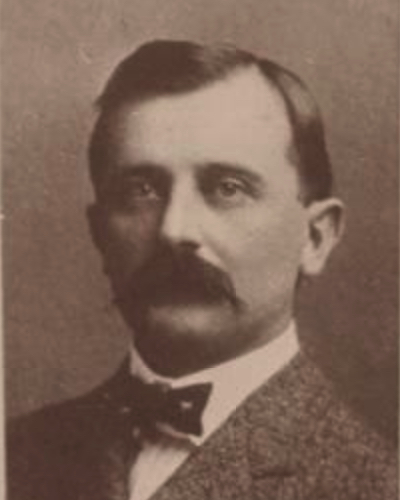
- Official portrait, 1903

Member of the Virginia Senate from the 37th district
- In office May 5, 1903 – January 10, 1912
- Preceded by: George W. LeCato
- Succeeded by: G. Walter Mapp

Personal details
- Born: Benjamin Thomas Gunter; December 16, 1865 Accomac, Virginia, U.S.
- Died: March 31, 1939 (aged 73) Accomac, Virginia, U.S.
- Party: Democratic
- Spouse: Annie Eastburn Fisher
- Children: 4, including Ben Jr.
- Education: Richmond College (BA); University of Virginia (LLB)
- Occupation: Lawyer; businessman; banker; politician

Benjamin Thomas Gunter (December 16, 1865 – March 31, 1939) was an American politician who served as a member of the Virginia Senate.

His son, Ben T. Gunter Jr., served in the Senate from 1944 to 1952.

Senate of Virginia
Preceded by George W. LeCato	Virginia Senator for the 37th District; 1903–1912	Succeeded by G. Walter Mapp
