= Benjamin Franklin Buchanan =

American politician (1857–1932)

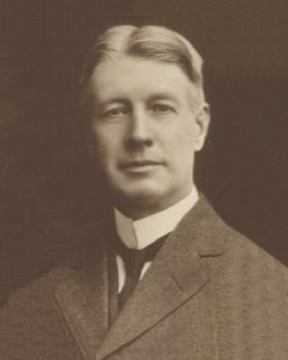

Member of the Virginia Senate from the 15th district
- In office January 9, 1924 – February 21, 1932
- Preceded by: John J. Miller
- Succeeded by: Burt L. Dickinson

21st Lieutenant Governor of Virginia
- In office February 1, 1918 – February 1, 1922
- Governor: Westmoreland Davis
- Preceded by: James Taylor Ellyson
- Succeeded by: Junius Edgar West

Member of the Virginia Senate from the 1st district
- In office January 14, 1914 – January 12, 1916
- Preceded by: David C. Cummings Jr.
- Succeeded by: John P. Buchanan
- In office December 6, 1893 – December 1, 1897
- Preceded by: E. L. Roberts
- Succeeded by: Charles W. Steele

Personal details
- Born: Benjamin Franklin Buchanan; October 4, 1857 Smyth County, Virginia, U.S.
- Died: February 21, 1932 (aged 74) Richmond, Virginia, U.S.
- Party: Democratic
- Spouse: Eleanor Fairman Sheffey (m.1887)
- Children: 4
- Education: University of Virginia

Benjamin Franklin Buchanan (October 4, 1857 – February 21, 1932) was an American lawyer and politician who served as the 21st Lieutenant Governor of Virginia from 1918 to 1922.

== Early life and education ==
Buchanan was born October 4, 1857, in Smyth County, Virginia, and graduated from the University of Virginia in 1880. He also received an LL.B. from the University of Virginia in 1884.

== Career ==
Buchanan practiced law in Marion and Abingdon. He also served as general counsel to the office of the United States comptroller of the currency from 1915 to 1921. He served several terms in the Senate of Virginia representing Smyth and Washington Counties, where he became one of the General Assembly's foremost authorities on taxation.

In 1917 Buchanan, a Democrat, won election as lieutenant governor of Virginia. He served from February 1, 1918, to February 1, 1922.

== Death and legacy ==
Buchanan died of a heart attack on February 21, 1932, in Richmond, where he was attending a session of the General Assembly. He was buried in Round Hill Cemetery in Marion. In 1934 the General Assembly designated the road that became state highway 16 in Smyth County the B. F. Buchanan Highway.

== Personal life ==
On March 2, 1887, Buchanan married Eleanor Fairman Sheffey. They had four sons and three daughters, including John Preston Buchanan, who succeeded Buchanan in the Senate.

Senate of Virginia
Preceded by E. L. Roberts	Virginia Senator for Washington and Smyth; 1893–1897	Succeeded by Charles W. Steele
Preceded by David C. Cummings, Jr.	Virginia Senator for the 1st District; 1914–1916	Succeeded by John P. Buchanan
Political offices
Preceded by James Taylor Ellyson	Lieutenant Governor of Virginia; 1918–1922	Succeeded by Junius Edgar West
