= Virginia's 1st Senate district =

American legislative district

Virginia's 1st State Senate district
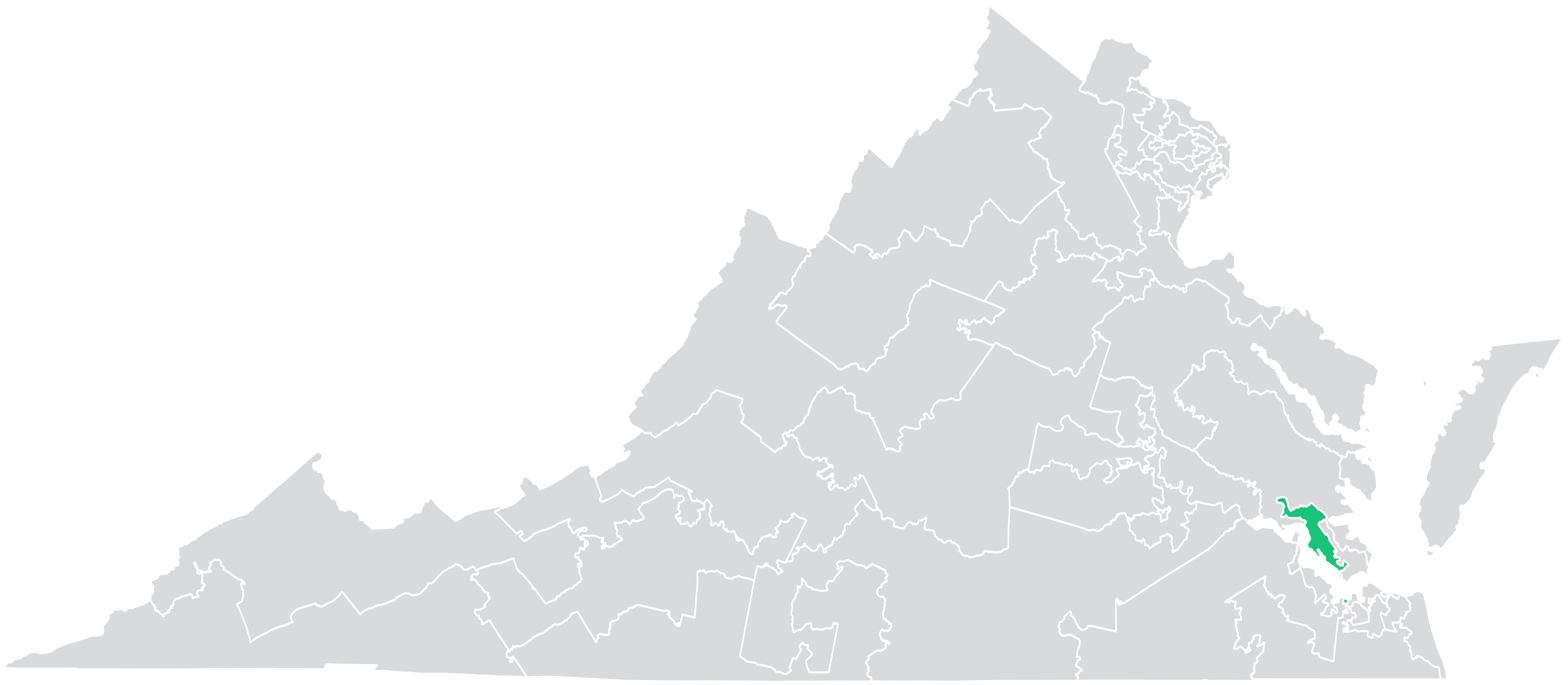
Senator
Timmy French; R–Woodstock
- Demographics: 51% White; 31% Black; 10% Hispanic; 4% Asian; 4% Other
- Population (2019): 202,074
- Registered voters: 132,915

Virginia's 1st Senate district is one of 40 districts in the Senate of Virginia.

== History ==
Since the 2023 Virginia Senate election, the state senator has been Republican Timmy French.

It had been represented by Democrat Monty Mason since his victory in a 2016 special election following the death of fellow Democrat John Miller.

== Geography ==
As of the 2023 Virginia Senate election, District 1 is located in northern Virginia, including all of Clarke, Frederick, Shenandoah, and Warren counties and the independent city of Winchester.

The district overlaps with Virginia's 6th congressional district and with the 31st, 32nd, and 33rd districts of the Virginia House of Delegates. The district is made up of areas that were previously part of the 26th and 27th Virginia Senate districts.

Before the 2023 elections, District 1 was located in the Hampton Roads metropolitan area in southeastern Virginia, including all of Williamsburg and parts of Hampton, Newport News, Suffolk, James City County, and York County.

== Recent election results ==
=== 2023 ===
2023 Virginia Senate election, District 1
Party	Candidate	Votes	%
Republican	Timmy French	37,453	58.2
Democratic	Emily Scott	21,334	33.2
Write-in		5,535	8.6
Total votes		64,322	100.0

=== 2019 (under previous district geography) ===
2019 Virginia Senate election, District 1
Party	Candidate	Votes	%
Democratic	Monty Mason (incumbent)	36,869	89.8
Write-in		4,174	10.2
Total votes		41,043	100
Democratic hold			

=== 2016 special ===
County and independent city results Mason: 50–60%; 60–70%

2016 Virginia Senate special election, District 1
Party	Candidate	Votes	%
Democratic	Monty Mason	49,251	58.1
Republican	Thomas R. Holston	31,740	37.4
Independent	John R. Bloom	3,534	4.2
Total votes		84,762	100
Democratic hold			

=== 2015 ===
2015 Virginia Senate election, District 1
Party	Candidate	Votes	%
Democratic	John Miller (incumbent)	17,989	59.4
Republican	Mark Matney	12,278	40.6
Total votes		30,267	100
Democratic hold			

=== 2011 ===
2011 Virginia Senate election, District 1
Party	Candidate	Votes	%
Democratic	John Miller (incumbent)	17,196	51.8
Republican	Michael Chohany	15,994	48.2
Total votes		33,190	100
Democratic hold			

=== Federal and statewide results ===
Year	Office	Results
2020	President	Biden 62.1–36.1%
2017	Governor	Northam 62.3–36.5%
2016	President	Clinton 57.5–36.8%
2014	Senate	Warner 56.8–40.9%
2013	Governor	McAuliffe 55.4–38.3%
2012	President	Obama 59.6–39.0%
2012	Senate	Kaine 60.8–39.2%

== Historical results ==
All election results below took place prior to 2011 redistricting, and thus were under different district lines.

=== 2007 ===
2007 Virginia Senate election, District 1
Primary election
Party	Candidate	Votes	%
Republican	Patricia Stall	4,757	54.3
Republican	Marty Williams (incumbent)	3,999	45.7
Total votes		8,756	100
General election
Democratic	John Miller	15,502	51.1
Republican	Patricia Stall	14,771	48.6
Total votes		30,366	100
Democratic gain from Republican			

=== 2003 ===
2003 Virginia Senate election, District 1
Party	Candidate	Votes	%
Republican	Marty Williams (incumbent)	10,261	94.5
Total votes		10,856	100
Republican hold			

=== 1999 ===
1999 Virginia Senate election, District 1
Party	Candidate	Votes	%
Republican	Marty Williams (incumbent)	25,416	96.1
Total votes		26,439	100
Republican hold			

=== 1995 ===
1995 Virginia Senate election, District 1
Primary election
Party	Candidate	Votes	%
Republican	Marty Williams	2,406	51.3
Republican	John J. Gill	2,284	48.7
Total votes		4,690	100
General election
Republican	Marty Williams	19,979	52.5
Democratic	Hunter Andrews (incumbent)	18,047	47.5
Total votes		38,033	100
Republican gain from Democratic			

== District officeholders since 1904 ==
Years	Senator, District 1	Counties/Cities in District
1904–1906	J. Cloyd Byars (D)	Washington County, Smyth County, City of Bristol
1906–1908	Alanson T. Lincoln (R)	Washington County, Smyth County, City of Bristol
1908–1912	Alanson T. Lincoln (R)	Washington County, Smyth County, City of Bristol
1912–1913	David C. Cummings, Jr. (D)	Washington County, Smyth County, City of Bristol
1913–1916	Benjamin F. Buchanan (D)	Washington County, Smyth County, City of Bristol
1916–1920	John P. Buchanan (D)	Washington County, Smyth County, City of Bristol
1920–1924	John H. Hassinger (R)	Washington County, Smyth County, City of Bristol
1924–1928	Warner Ames (D)	Accomac County, Northampton County, Princess Anne County
1928–1932	George L. Doughty (D)	Accomac County, Northampton County, Princess Anne County
1932–1936	Jefferson F. Walter (D)	Accomac County, Northampton County, Princess Anne County
1936–1940	Jefferson F. Walter (D)	Accomac County, Northampton County, Princess Anne County
1940–1942	Jefferson F. Walter (D)	Accomac County, Northampton County, Princess Anne County
1942–1944	Ben T. Gunter Jr. (D)	Accomac County, Northampton County, Princess Anne County
1944–1948	Ben T. Gunter Jr. (D)	Accomac County, Northampton County, Princess Anne County
1948–1952	Ben T. Gunter Jr. (D)	Accomac County, Northampton County, Princess Anne County
1952–1956	V. Alfred Etheridge (D)	Accomac County, Northampton County, Princess Anne County
1956–1960	E. Almer Ames Jr. (D)	Accomac County, Northampton County, Princess Anne County, City of Virginia Beach
1960–1964	E. Almer Ames Jr. (D)	Accomac County, Northampton County, Princess Anne County, City of Virginia Beach
1964–1966	E. Almer Ames Jr. (D)	Accomac County, Northampton County, Princess Anne County, City of Virginia Beach
1966–1968	E. Almer Ames Jr. (D)	Accomac County, Gloucester County, Northampton County, Mathews County, and York County
1968–1972	William E. Fears (D)	Accomac County, Gloucester County, Northampton County, Mathews County, and York County
1972–1976	Hunter Andrews (D)	City of Hampton
1976–1980	Hunter Andrews (D)	City of Hampton
1980–1984	Hunter Andrews (D)	City of Hampton
1984–1988	Hunter Andrews (D)	City of Hampton
1988–1992	Hunter Andrews (D)	City of Hampton
1992–1996	Hunter Andrews (D)	City of Poquoson, City of Hampton (part), City of Newport News (part) and York County (part)
1996–2000	Marty Williams (R)	City of Poquoson, City of Hampton (part), City of Newport News (part) and York County (part)
2000–2004	Marty Williams (R)	City of Poquoson, City of Hampton (part), City of Newport News (part) and York County (part)
2004–2008	Marty Williams (R)	City of Poquoson, City of Hampton (part), City of Newport News (part) and York County (part)
2008–2012	John C. Miller (D)	City of Poquoson, City of Hampton (part), City of Newport News (part) and York County (part)
2012–2016	John C. Miller (D)	City of Williamsburg, James City County (part), York County (part), City of Hampton (part), City of Newport News (part) and City of Suffolk (part)
2016–present	T. Monty Mason (D)	City of Williamsburg, James City County (part), York County (part), City of Hampton (part), City of Newport News (part) and City of Suffolk (part)
