= Index of U.S. counties =

This is an alphabetical list of counties and county equivalents in the United States, including independent cities, Alaska boroughs and census areas, Connecticut's historical counties and councils of governments, Louisiana parishes, the District of Columbia, and the equivalents in U.S. territories.

== A ==
- Abbeville County, South Carolina
- Acadia Parish, Louisiana
- Accomack County, Virginia
- Ada County, Idaho
- Adair County: Iowa; Kentucky; Missouri; Oklahoma
- Adams County: Colorado; Idaho; Illinois; Indiana; Iowa; Mississippi; Nebraska; North Dakota; Ohio; Pennsylvania; Washington; Wisconsin
- Addison County, Vermont
- Adjuntas Municipality, Puerto Rico
- Aguada Municipality, Puerto Rico
- Aguadilla Municipality, Puerto Rico
- Aguas Buenas Municipality, Puerto Rico
- Aibonito Municipality, Puerto Rico
- Aiken County, South Carolina
- Aitkin County, Minnesota
- Alachua County, Florida
- Alamance County, North Carolina
- Alameda County, California
- Alamosa County, Colorado
- Albany County: New York; Wyoming
- Albemarle County, Virginia
- Alcona County, Michigan
- Alcorn County, Mississippi
- Aleutians East Borough, Alaska
- Aleutians West Census Area, Alaska
- Alexander County: Illinois; North Carolina
- Alexandria, Virginia (Note: One of the independent cities that are exclusive of any county.)
- Alfalfa County, Oklahoma
- Alger County, Michigan
- Allamakee County, Iowa
- Allegan County, Michigan
- Allegany County: Maryland; New York
- Alleghany County: North Carolina; Virginia
- Allegheny County, Pennsylvania
- Allen County: Indiana; Kansas; Kentucky; Ohio
- Allen Parish, Louisiana
- Allendale County, South Carolina
- Alpena County, Michigan
- Alpine County, California
- Amador County, California
- Amelia County, Virginia
- Amherst County, Virginia
- Amite County, Mississippi
- Añasco Municipality, Puerto Rico
- Anchorage, Alaska (Note: The Municipality of Anchorage, Alaska has a fully consolidated city and borough government.)
- Anderson County: Kansas; Kentucky; South Carolina; Tennessee; Texas
- Andrew County, Missouri
- Andrews County, Texas
- Androscoggin County, Maine
- Angelina County, Texas
- Anne Arundel County, Maryland
- Anoka County, Minnesota
- Anson County, North Carolina
- Antelope County, Nebraska
- Antrim County, Michigan
- Apache County, Arizona
- Appanoose County, Iowa
- Appling County, Georgia
- Appomattox County, Virginia
- Aransas County, Texas
- Arapahoe County, Colorado
- Archer County, Texas
- Archuleta County, Colorado
- Arecibo Municipality, Puerto Rico
- Arenac County, Michigan
- Arkansas County, Arkansas
- Arlington County, Virginia
- Armstrong County: Pennsylvania; Texas
- Aroostook County, Maine
- Arroyo Municipality, Puerto Rico
- Arthur County, Nebraska
- Ascension Parish, Louisiana
- Ashe County, North Carolina
- Ashland County: Ohio; Wisconsin
- Ashley County, Arkansas
- Ashtabula County, Ohio
- Asotin County, Washington
- Assumption Parish, Louisiana
- Atascosa County, Texas
- Atchison County: Kansas; Missouri
- Athens County, Ohio
- Atkinson County, Georgia
- Atlantic County, New Jersey
- Atoka County, Oklahoma
- Attala County, Mississippi
- Audrain County, Missouri
- Audubon County, Iowa
- Auglaize County, Ohio
- Augusta County, Virginia
- Aurora County, South Dakota
- Austin County, Texas
- Autauga County, Alabama
- Avery County, North Carolina
- Avoyelles Parish, Louisiana

== B ==
- Baca County, Colorado
- Bacon County, Georgia
- Bailey County, Texas
- Baker County: Florida; Georgia; Oregon
- Baker Island, U.S. Minor Outlying Islands
- Baldwin County: Alabama; Georgia
- Ballard County, Kentucky
- Baltimore, Maryland
- Baltimore County, Maryland
- Bamberg County, South Carolina
- Bandera County, Texas
- Banks County, Georgia
- Banner County, Nebraska
- Bannock County, Idaho
- Baraga County, Michigan
- Barber County, Kansas
- Barbour County: Alabama; West Virginia
- Barceloneta Municipality, Puerto Rico
- Barnes County, North Dakota
- Barnstable County, Massachusetts
- Barnwell County, South Carolina
- Barranquitas Municipality, Puerto Rico
- Barren County, Kentucky
- Barron County, Wisconsin
- Barrow County, Georgia
- Barry County: Michigan; Missouri
- Bartholomew County, Indiana
- Barton County: Kansas; Missouri
- Bartow County, Georgia
- Bastrop County, Texas
- Bates County, Missouri
- Bath County: Kentucky; Virginia
- Baxter County, Arkansas
- Bay County: Florida; Michigan
- Bayamón Municipality, Puerto Rico
- Bayfield County, Wisconsin
- Baylor County, Texas
- Beadle County, South Dakota
- Bear Lake County, Idaho
- Beaufort County: North Carolina; South Carolina
- Beauregard Parish, Louisiana
- Beaver County: Oklahoma; Pennsylvania; Utah
- Beaverhead County, Montana
- Becker County, Minnesota
- Beckham County, Oklahoma
- Bedford County: Pennsylvania; Tennessee; Virginia
- Bee County, Texas
- Belknap County, New Hampshire
- Bell County: Kentucky; Texas
- Belmont County, Ohio
- Beltrami County, Minnesota
- Ben Hill County, Georgia
- Benewah County, Idaho
- Bennett County, South Dakota
- Bennington County, Vermont
- Benson County, North Dakota
- Bent County, Colorado
- Benton County: Arkansas; Indiana; Iowa; Minnesota; Mississippi; Missouri; Oregon; Tennessee; Washington
- Benzie County, Michigan
- Bergen County, New Jersey
- Berkeley County: South Carolina; West Virginia
- Berks County, Pennsylvania
- Berkshire County, Massachusetts
- Bernalillo County, New Mexico
- Berrien County: Georgia; Michigan
- Bertie County, North Carolina
- Bethel Census Area, Alaska
- Bexar County, Texas
- Bibb County: Alabama; Georgia
- Bienville Parish, Louisiana
- Big Horn County: Montana; Wyoming
- Big Stone County, Minnesota
- Billings County, North Dakota
- Bingham County, Idaho
- Black Hawk County, Iowa
- Blackford County, Indiana
- Bladen County, North Carolina
- Blaine County: Idaho; Montana; Nebraska; Oklahoma
- Blair County, Pennsylvania
- Blanco County, Texas
- Bland County, Virginia
- Bleckley County, Georgia
- Bledsoe County, Tennessee
- Blount County: Alabama; Tennessee
- Blue Earth County, Minnesota
- Boise County, Idaho
- Bolivar County, Mississippi
- Bollinger County, Missouri
- Bon Homme County, South Dakota
- Bond County, Illinois
- Bonner County, Idaho
- Bonneville County, Idaho
- Boone County: Arkansas; Illinois; Indiana; Iowa; Kentucky; Missouri; Nebraska; West Virginia
- Borden County, Texas
- Bosque County, Texas
- Bossier Parish, Louisiana
- Botetourt County, Virginia
- Bottineau County, North Dakota
- Boulder County, Colorado
- Boundary County, Idaho
- Bourbon County: Kansas; Kentucky
- Bowie County, Texas
- Bowman County, North Dakota
- Box Butte County, Nebraska
- Box Elder County, Utah
- Boyd County: Kentucky; Nebraska
- Boyle County, Kentucky
- Bracken County, Kentucky
- Bradford County: Florida; Pennsylvania
- Bradley County: Arkansas; Tennessee
- Branch County, Michigan
- Brantley County, Georgia
- Braxton County, West Virginia
- Brazoria County, Texas
- Brazos County, Texas
- Breathitt County, Kentucky
- Breckinridge County, Kentucky
- Bremer County, Iowa
- Brevard County, Florida
- Brewster County, Texas
- Briscoe County, Texas
- Bristol, Virginia
- Bristol Bay Borough, Alaska
- Bristol County: Massachusetts; Rhode Island
- Broadwater County, Montana
- Bronx County, New York
- Brooke County, West Virginia
- Brookings County, South Dakota
- Brooks County: Georgia; Texas
- Broome County, New York
- Broomfield, Colorado (Note: The City and County of Broomfield, Colorado has a fully consolidated city and county government.)
- Broward County, Florida
- Brown County: Illinois; Indiana; Kansas; Minnesota; Nebraska; Ohio; South Dakota; Texas; Wisconsin
- Brule County, South Dakota
- Brunswick County: North Carolina; Virginia
- Bryan County: Georgia; Oklahoma
- Buchanan County: Iowa; Missouri; Virginia
- Buckingham County, Virginia
- Bucks County, Pennsylvania
- Buena Vista, Virginia
- Buena Vista County, Iowa
- Buffalo County: Nebraska; South Dakota; Wisconsin
- Bullitt County, Kentucky
- Bulloch County, Georgia
- Bullock County, Alabama
- Buncombe County, North Carolina
- Bureau County, Illinois
- Burke County: Georgia; North Carolina; North Dakota
- Burleigh County, North Dakota
- Burleson County, Texas
- Burlington County, New Jersey
- Burnet County, Texas
- Burnett County, Wisconsin
- Burt County, Nebraska
- Butler County: Alabama; Iowa; Kansas; Kentucky; Missouri; Nebraska; Ohio; Pennsylvania
- Butte County: California; Idaho; South Dakota
- Butts County, Georgia

== C ==
- Cabarrus County, North Carolina
- Cabell County, West Virginia
- Cabo Rojo Municipality, Puerto Rico
- Cache County, Utah
- Caddo County, Oklahoma
- Caddo Parish, Louisiana
- Caguas Municipality, Puerto Rico
- Calaveras County, California
- Calcasieu Parish, Louisiana
- Caldwell County: Kentucky; Missouri; North Carolina; Texas
- Caldwell Parish, Louisiana
- Caledonia County, Vermont
- Calhoun County: Alabama; Arkansas; Florida; Georgia; Illinois; Iowa; Michigan; Mississippi; South Carolina; Texas; West Virginia
- Callahan County, Texas
- Callaway County, Missouri
- Calloway County, Kentucky
- Calumet County, Wisconsin
- Calvert County, Maryland
- Camas County, Idaho
- Cambria County, Pennsylvania
- Camden County: Georgia; Missouri; New Jersey; North Carolina
- Cameron County: Pennsylvania; Texas
- Cameron Parish, Louisiana
- Camp County, Texas
- Campbell County: Kentucky; South Dakota; Tennessee; Virginia; Wyoming
- Camuy Municipality, Puerto Rico
- Canadian County, Oklahoma
- Candler County, Georgia
- Cannon County, Tennessee
- Canóvanas Municipality, Puerto Rico
- Canyon County, Idaho
- Cape Girardeau County, Missouri
- Cape May County, New Jersey
- Capitol Planning Region, Connecticut (Note: The United States Census Bureau and other federal agencies recognize the Connecticut councils of government as county equivalents.)
- Carbon County: Montana; Pennsylvania; Utah; Wyoming
- Caribou County, Idaho
- Carlisle County, Kentucky
- Carlton County, Minnesota
- Carolina Municipality, Puerto Rico
- Caroline County: Maryland; Virginia
- Carroll County: Arkansas; Georgia; Illinois; Indiana; Iowa; Kentucky; Maryland; Mississippi; Missouri; New Hampshire; Ohio; Tennessee; Virginia
- Carson City, Nevada
- Carson County, Texas
- Carter County: Kentucky; Missouri; Montana; Oklahoma; Tennessee
- Carteret County, North Carolina
- Carver County, Minnesota
- Cascade County, Montana
- Casey County, Kentucky
- Cass County: Illinois; Indiana; Iowa; Michigan; Minnesota; Missouri; Nebraska; North Dakota; Texas
- Cassia County, Idaho
- Castro County, Texas
- Caswell County, North Carolina
- Catahoula Parish, Louisiana
- Cataño Municipality, Puerto Rico
- Catawba County, North Carolina
- Catoosa County, Georgia
- Catron County, New Mexico
- Cattaraugus County, New York
- Cavalier County, North Dakota
- Cayey Municipality, Puerto Rico
- Cayuga County, New York
- Cecil County, Maryland
- Cedar County: Iowa; Missouri; Nebraska
- Ceiba Municipality, Puerto Rico
- Centre County, Pennsylvania
- Cerro Gordo County, Iowa
- Chaffee County, Colorado
- Chambers County: Alabama; Texas
- Champaign County: Illinois; Ohio
- Chariton County, Missouri
- Charles City County, Virginia
- Charles County, Maryland
- Charles Mix County, South Dakota
- Charleston County, South Carolina
- Charlevoix County, Michigan
- Charlotte County: Florida; Virginia
- Charlottesville, Virginia
- Charlton County, Georgia
- Chase County: Kansas; Nebraska
- Chatham County: Georgia; North Carolina
- Chattahoochee County, Georgia
- Chattooga County, Georgia
- Chautauqua County: Kansas; New York
- Chaves County, New Mexico
- Cheatham County, Tennessee
- Cheboygan County, Michigan
- Chelan County, Washington
- Chemung County, New York
- Chenango County, New York
- Cherokee County: Alabama; Georgia; Iowa; Kansas; North Carolina; Oklahoma; South Carolina; Texas
- Cherry County, Nebraska
- Chesapeake, Virginia
- Cheshire County, New Hampshire
- Chester County: Pennsylvania; South Carolina; Tennessee
- Chesterfield County: South Carolina; Virginia
- Cheyenne County: Colorado; Kansas; Nebraska
- Chickasaw County: Iowa; Mississippi
- Chicot County, Arkansas
- Childress County, Texas
- Chilton County, Alabama
- Chippewa County: Michigan; Minnesota; Wisconsin
- Chisago County, Minnesota
- Chittenden County, Vermont
- Choctaw County: Alabama; Mississippi; Oklahoma
- Chouteau County, Montana
- Chowan County, North Carolina
- Christian County: Illinois; Kentucky; Missouri
- Chugach Census Area, Alaska
- Churchill County, Nevada
- Ciales Municipality, Puerto Rico
- Cibola County, New Mexico
- Cidra Municipality, Puerto Rico
- Cimarron County, Oklahoma
- Citrus County, Florida
- Clackamas County, Oregon
- Claiborne County: Mississippi; Tennessee
- Claiborne Parish, Louisiana
- Clallam County, Washington
- Clare County, Michigan
- Clarendon County, South Carolina
- Clarion County, Pennsylvania
- Clark County: Arkansas; Idaho; Illinois; Indiana; Kansas; Kentucky; Missouri; Nevada; Ohio; South Dakota; Washington; Wisconsin
- Clarke County: Alabama; Georgia; Iowa; Mississippi; Virginia
- Clatsop County, Oregon
- Clay County: Alabama; Arkansas; Florida; Georgia; Illinois; Indiana; Iowa; Kansas; Kentucky; Minnesota; Mississippi; Missouri; Nebraska; North Carolina; South Dakota; Tennessee; Texas; West Virginia
- Clayton County: Georgia; Iowa
- Clear Creek County, Colorado
- Clearfield County, Pennsylvania
- Clearwater County: Idaho; Minnesota
- Cleburne County: Alabama; Arkansas
- Clermont County, Ohio
- Cleveland County: Arkansas; North Carolina; Oklahoma
- Clinch County, Georgia
- Clinton County: Illinois; Indiana; Iowa; Kentucky; Michigan; Missouri; New York; Ohio; Pennsylvania
- Cloud County, Kansas
- Coahoma County, Mississippi
- Coal County, Oklahoma
- Coamo Municipality, Puerto Rico
- Cobb County, Georgia
- Cochise County, Arizona
- Cochran County, Texas
- Cocke County, Tennessee
- Coconino County, Arizona
- Codington County, South Dakota
- Coffee County: Alabama; Georgia; Tennessee
- Coffey County, Kansas
- Coke County, Texas
- Colbert County, Alabama
- Cole County, Missouri
- Coleman County, Texas
- Coles County, Illinois
- Colfax County: Nebraska; New Mexico
- Colleton County, South Carolina
- Collier County, Florida
- Collin County, Texas
- Collingsworth County, Texas
- Colonial Heights, Virginia
- Colorado County, Texas
- Colquitt County, Georgia
- Columbia County: Arkansas; Florida; Georgia; New York; Oregon; Pennsylvania; Washington; Wisconsin
- Columbiana County, Ohio
- Columbus County, North Carolina
- Colusa County, California
- Comal County, Texas
- Comanche County: Kansas; Oklahoma; Texas
- Comerío Municipality, Puerto Rico
- Concho County, Texas
- Concordia Parish, Louisiana
- Conecuh County, Alabama
- Conejos County, Colorado
- Contra Costa County, California
- Converse County, Wyoming
- Conway County, Arkansas
- Cook County: Georgia; Illinois; Minnesota
- Cooke County, Texas
- Cooper County, Missouri
- Coos County, Oregon
- Coös County, New Hampshire
- Coosa County, Alabama
- Copiah County, Mississippi
- Copper River Census Area, Alaska
- Corozal Municipality, Puerto Rico
- Corson County, South Dakota
- Cortland County, New York
- Coryell County, Texas
- Coshocton County, Ohio
- Costilla County, Colorado
- Cottle County, Texas
- Cotton County, Oklahoma
- Cottonwood County, Minnesota
- Covington, Virginia
- Covington County: Alabama; Mississippi
- Coweta County, Georgia
- Cowley County, Kansas
- Cowlitz County, Washington
- Craig County: Oklahoma; Virginia
- Craighead County, Arkansas
- Crane County, Texas
- Craven County, North Carolina
- Crawford County: Arkansas; Georgia; Illinois; Indiana; Iowa; Kansas; Michigan; Missouri; Ohio; Pennsylvania; Wisconsin
- Creek County, Oklahoma
- Crenshaw County, Alabama
- Crisp County, Georgia
- Crittenden County: Arkansas; Kentucky
- Crockett County: Tennessee; Texas
- Crook County: Oregon; Wyoming
- Crosby County, Texas
- Cross County, Arkansas
- Crow Wing County, Minnesota
- Crowley County, Colorado
- Culberson County, Texas
- Culebra Municipality, Puerto Rico
- Cullman County, Alabama
- Culpeper County, Virginia
- Cumberland County: Illinois; Kentucky; Maine; New Jersey; North Carolina; Pennsylvania; Tennessee; Virginia
- Cuming County, Nebraska
- Currituck County, North Carolina
- Curry County: New Mexico; Oregon
- Custer County: Colorado; Idaho; Montana; Nebraska; Oklahoma; South Dakota
- Cuyahoga County, Ohio

== D ==
- Dade County: Georgia; Missouri; (Florida)
- Daggett County, Utah
- Dakota County: Minnesota; Nebraska
- Dale County, Alabama
- Dallam County, Texas
- Dallas County: Alabama; Arkansas; Iowa; Missouri; Texas
- Dane County, Wisconsin
- Daniels County, Montana
- Danville, Virginia
- Dare County, North Carolina
- Darke County, Ohio
- Darlington County, South Carolina
- Dauphin County, Pennsylvania
- Davidson County: North Carolina; Tennessee
- Davie County, North Carolina
- Daviess County: Indiana; Kentucky; Missouri
- Davis County: Iowa; Utah
- Davison County, South Dakota
- Dawes County, Nebraska
- Dawson County: Georgia; Montana; Nebraska; Texas
- Day County, South Dakota
- De Baca County, New Mexico
- DeKalb County: Alabama; Georgia; Illinois; Indiana; Missouri; Tennessee
- De Soto Parish, Louisiana
- DeSoto County: Florida; Mississippi
- De Witt County, Illinois
- DeWitt County, Texas
- Deaf Smith County, Texas
- Dearborn County, Indiana
- Decatur County: Georgia; Indiana; Iowa; Kansas; Tennessee
- Deer Lodge County, Montana
- Defiance County, Ohio
- Del Norte County, California
- Delaware County: Indiana; Iowa; New York; Ohio; Oklahoma; Pennsylvania
- Delta County: Colorado; Michigan; Texas
- Denali Borough, Alaska
- Dent County, Missouri
- Denton County, Texas
- Denver, Colorado (Note: The City and County of Denver, Colorado has a fully consolidated city and county government.)
- Des Moines County, Iowa
- Deschutes County, Oregon
- Desha County, Arkansas
- Deuel County: Nebraska; South Dakota
- Dewey County: Oklahoma; South Dakota
- Dickens County, Texas
- Dickenson County, Virginia
- Dickey County, North Dakota
- Dickinson County: Iowa; Kansas; Michigan
- Dickson County, Tennessee
- Dillingham Census Area, Alaska
- Dillon County, South Carolina
- Dimmit County, Texas
- Dinwiddie County, Virginia
- District of Columbia
- Divide County, North Dakota
- Dixie County, Florida
- Dixon County, Nebraska
- Doddridge County, West Virginia
- Dodge County: Georgia; Minnesota; Nebraska; Wisconsin
- Dolores County, Colorado
- Doña Ana County, New Mexico
- Doniphan County, Kansas
- Donley County, Texas
- Dooly County, Georgia
- Door County, Wisconsin
- Dorado Municipality, Puerto Rico
- Dorchester County: Maryland; South Carolina
- Dougherty County, Georgia
- Douglas County: Colorado; Georgia; Illinois; Kansas; Minnesota; Missouri; Nebraska; Nevada; Oregon; South Dakota; Washington; Wisconsin
- Drew County, Arkansas
- DuPage County, Illinois
- Dubois County, Indiana
- Dubuque County, Iowa
- Duchesne County, Utah
- Dukes County, Massachusetts
- Dundy County, Nebraska
- Dunklin County, Missouri
- Dunn County: North Dakota; Wisconsin
- Duplin County, North Carolina
- Durham County, North Carolina
- Dutchess County, New York
- Duval County: Florida; Texas
- Dyer County, Tennessee

== E ==
- Eagle County, Colorado
- Early County, Georgia
- East Baton Rouge Parish, Louisiana
- East Carroll Parish, Louisiana
- East Feliciana Parish, Louisiana
- Eastern District, American Samoa
- Eastland County, Texas
- Eaton County, Michigan
- Eau Claire County, Wisconsin
- Echols County, Georgia
- Ector County, Texas
- Eddy County: New Mexico; North Dakota
- Edgar County, Illinois
- Edgecombe County, North Carolina
- Edgefield County, South Carolina
- Edmonson County, Kentucky
- Edmunds County, South Dakota
- Edwards County: Illinois; Kansas; Texas
- Effingham County: Georgia; Illinois
- El Dorado County, California
- El Paso County: Colorado; Texas
- Elbert County: Colorado; Georgia
- Elk County: Kansas; Pennsylvania
- Elkhart County, Indiana
- Elko County, Nevada
- Elliott County, Kentucky
- Ellis County: Kansas; Oklahoma; Texas
- Ellsworth County, Kansas
- Elmore County: Alabama; Idaho
- Emanuel County, Georgia
- Emery County, Utah
- Emmet County: Iowa; Michigan
- Emmons County, North Dakota
- Emporia, Virginia
- Erath County, Texas
- Erie County: New York; Ohio; Pennsylvania
- Escambia County: Alabama; Florida
- Esmeralda County, Nevada
- Essex County: Massachusetts; New Jersey; New York; Vermont; Virginia
- Estill County, Kentucky
- Etowah County, Alabama
- Eureka County, Nevada
- Evangeline Parish, Louisiana
- Evans County, Georgia

== F ==
- Fairbanks North Star Borough, Alaska
- Fairfax, Virginia
- Fairfax County, Virginia
- Fairfield County: Connecticut; Ohio; South Carolina
- Fajardo Municipality, Puerto Rico
- Fall River County, South Dakota
- Fallon County, Montana
- Falls Church, Virginia
- Falls County, Texas
- Fannin County: Georgia; Texas
- Faribault County, Minnesota
- Faulk County, South Dakota
- Faulkner County, Arkansas
- Fauquier County, Virginia
- Fayette County: Alabama; Georgia; Illinois; Indiana; Iowa; Kentucky; Ohio; Pennsylvania; Tennessee; Texas; West Virginia
- Fentress County, Tennessee
- Fergus County, Montana
- Ferry County, Washington
- Fillmore County: Minnesota; Nebraska
- Finney County, Kansas
- Fisher County, Texas
- Flagler County, Florida
- Flathead County, Montana
- Fleming County, Kentucky
- Florence County: South Carolina; Wisconsin
- Florida Municipality, Puerto Rico
- Floyd County: Georgia; Indiana; Iowa; Kentucky; Texas; Virginia
- Fluvanna County, Virginia
- Foard County, Texas
- Fond du Lac County, Wisconsin
- Ford County: Illinois; Kansas
- Forest County: Pennsylvania; Wisconsin
- Forrest County, Mississippi
- Forsyth County: Georgia; North Carolina
- Fort Bend County, Texas
- Foster County, North Dakota
- Fountain County, Indiana
- Franklin, Virginia
- Franklin County: Alabama; Arkansas; Florida; Georgia; Idaho; Illinois; Indiana; Iowa; Kansas; Kentucky; Maine; Massachusetts; Mississippi; Missouri; Nebraska; New York; North Carolina; Ohio; Pennsylvania; Tennessee; Texas; Vermont; Virginia; Washington
- Franklin Parish, Louisiana
- Frederick County: Maryland; Virginia
- Fredericksburg, Virginia
- Freeborn County, Minnesota
- Freestone County, Texas
- Fremont County: Colorado; Idaho; Iowa; Wyoming
- Fresno County, California
- Frio County, Texas
- Frontier County, Nebraska
- Fulton County: Arkansas; Georgia; Illinois; Indiana; Kentucky; New York; Ohio; Pennsylvania
- Furnas County, Nebraska

== G ==
- Gadsden County, Florida
- Gage County, Nebraska
- Gaines County, Texas
- Galax, Virginia
- Gallatin County: Illinois; Kentucky; Montana
- Gallia County, Ohio
- Galveston County, Texas
- Garden County, Nebraska
- Garfield County: Colorado; Montana; Nebraska; Oklahoma; Utah; Washington
- Garland County, Arkansas
- Garrard County, Kentucky
- Garrett County, Maryland
- Garvin County, Oklahoma
- Garza County, Texas
- Gasconade County, Missouri
- Gaston County, North Carolina
- Gates County, North Carolina
- Geary County, Kansas
- Geauga County, Ohio
- Gem County, Idaho
- Genesee County: Michigan; New York
- Geneva County, Alabama
- Gentry County, Missouri
- George County, Mississippi
- Georgetown County, South Carolina
- Gibson County: Indiana; Tennessee
- Gila County, Arizona
- Gilchrist County, Florida
- Giles County: Tennessee; Virginia
- Gillespie County, Texas
- Gilliam County, Oregon
- Gilmer County: Georgia; West Virginia
- Gilpin County, Colorado
- Glacier County, Montana
- Glades County, Florida
- Gladwin County, Michigan
- Glascock County, Georgia
- Glasscock County, Texas
- Glenn County, California
- Gloucester County: New Jersey; Virginia
- Glynn County, Georgia
- Gogebic County, Michigan
- Golden Valley County: Montana; North Dakota
- Goliad County, Texas
- Gonzales County, Texas
- Goochland County, Virginia
- Goodhue County, Minnesota
- Gooding County, Idaho
- Gordon County, Georgia
- Goshen County, Wyoming
- Gosper County, Nebraska
- Gove County, Kansas
- Grady County: Georgia; Oklahoma
- Grafton County, New Hampshire
- Graham County: Arizona; Kansas; North Carolina
- Grainger County, Tennessee
- Grand County: Colorado; Utah
- Grand Forks County, North Dakota
- Grand Isle County, Vermont
- Grand Traverse County, Michigan
- Granite County, Montana
- Grant County: Arkansas; Indiana; Kansas; Kentucky; Minnesota; Nebraska; New Mexico; North Dakota; Oklahoma; Oregon; South Dakota; Washington; West Virginia; Wisconsin
- Grant Parish, Louisiana
- Granville County, North Carolina
- Gratiot County, Michigan
- Graves County, Kentucky
- Gray County: Kansas; Texas
- Grays Harbor County, Washington
- Grayson County: Kentucky; Texas; Virginia
- Greater Bridgeport Planning Region, Connecticut
- Greeley County: Kansas; Nebraska
- Green County: Kentucky; Wisconsin
- Green Lake County, Wisconsin
- Greenbrier County, West Virginia
- Greene County: Alabama; Arkansas; Georgia; Illinois; Indiana; Iowa; Mississippi; Missouri; New York; North Carolina; Ohio; Pennsylvania; Tennessee; Virginia
- Greenlee County, Arizona
- Greensville County, Virginia
- Greenup County, Kentucky
- Greenville County, South Carolina
- Greenwood County: Kansas; South Carolina
- Greer County, Oklahoma
- Gregg County, Texas
- Gregory County, South Dakota
- Grenada County, Mississippi
- Griggs County, North Dakota
- Grimes County, Texas
- Grundy County: Illinois; Iowa; Missouri; Tennessee
- Guadalupe County: New Mexico; Texas
- Guam
- Guánica Municipality, Puerto Rico
- Guayama Municipality, Puerto Rico
- Guayanilla Municipality, Puerto Rico
- Guaynabo Municipality, Puerto Rico
- Guernsey County, Ohio
- Guilford County, North Carolina
- Gulf County, Florida
- Gunnison County, Colorado
- Gurabo Municipality, Puerto Rico
- Guthrie County, Iowa
- Gwinnett County, Georgia

== H ==
- Haakon County, South Dakota
- Habersham County, Georgia
- Haines Borough, Alaska
- Hale County: Alabama; Texas
- Halifax County: North Carolina; Virginia
- Hall County: Georgia; Nebraska; Texas
- Hamblen County, Tennessee
- Hamilton County: Florida; Illinois; Indiana; Iowa; Kansas; Nebraska; New York; Ohio; Tennessee; Texas
- Hamlin County, South Dakota
- Hampden County, Massachusetts
- Hampshire County: Massachusetts; West Virginia
- Hampton, Virginia
- Hampton County, South Carolina
- Hancock County: Georgia; Illinois; Indiana; Iowa; Kentucky; Maine; Mississippi; Ohio; Tennessee; West Virginia
- Hand County, South Dakota
- Hanover County, Virginia
- Hansford County, Texas
- Hanson County, South Dakota
- Haralson County, Georgia
- Hardee County, Florida
- Hardeman County: Tennessee; Texas
- Hardin County: Illinois; Iowa; Kentucky; Ohio; Tennessee; Texas
- Harding County: New Mexico; South Dakota
- Hardy County, West Virginia
- Harford County, Maryland
- Harlan County: Kentucky; Nebraska
- Harmon County, Oklahoma
- Harnett County, North Carolina
- Harney County, Oregon
- Harper County: Kansas; Oklahoma
- Harris County: Georgia; Texas
- Harrison County: Indiana; Iowa; Kentucky; Mississippi; Missouri; Ohio; Texas; West Virginia
- Harrisonburg, Virginia
- Hart County: Georgia; Kentucky
- Hartford County, Connecticut
- Hartley County, Texas
- Harvey County, Kansas
- Haskell County: Kansas; Oklahoma; Texas
- Hatillo Municipality, Puerto Rico
- Hawaiʻi County, Hawaii
- Hawkins County, Tennessee
- Hayes County, Nebraska
- Hays County, Texas
- Haywood County: North Carolina; Tennessee
- Heard County, Georgia
- Hemphill County, Texas
- Hempstead County, Arkansas
- Henderson County: Illinois; Kentucky; North Carolina; Tennessee; Texas
- Hendricks County, Indiana
- Hendry County, Florida
- Hennepin County, Minnesota
- Henrico County, Virginia
- Henry County: Alabama; Georgia; Illinois; Indiana; Iowa; Kentucky; Missouri; Ohio; Tennessee; Virginia
- Herkimer County, New York
- Hernando County, Florida
- Hertford County, North Carolina
- Hettinger County, North Dakota
- Hickman County: Kentucky; Tennessee
- Hickory County, Missouri
- Hidalgo County: New Mexico; Texas
- Highland County: Ohio; Virginia
- Highlands County, Florida
- Hill County: Montana; Texas
- Hillsborough County: Florida; New Hampshire
- Hillsdale County, Michigan
- Hinds County, Mississippi
- Hinsdale County, Colorado
- Hitchcock County, Nebraska
- Hocking County, Ohio
- Hockley County, Texas
- Hodgeman County, Kansas
- Hoke County, North Carolina
- Holmes County: Florida; Mississippi; Ohio
- Holt County: Missouri; Nebraska
- Honolulu County, Hawaii
- Hood County, Texas
- Hood River County, Oregon
- Hooker County, Nebraska
- Hopewell, Virginia
- Hopkins County: Kentucky; Texas
- Hormigueros Municipality, Puerto Rico
- Horry County, South Carolina
- Hot Spring County, Arkansas
- Hot Springs County, Wyoming
- Houghton County, Michigan
- Houston County: Alabama; Georgia; Minnesota; Tennessee; Texas
- Howard County: Arkansas; Indiana; Iowa; Maryland; Missouri; Nebraska; Texas
- Howell County, Missouri
- Howland Island, U.S. Minor Outlying Islands
- Hubbard County, Minnesota
- Hudson County, New Jersey
- Hudspeth County, Texas
- Huerfano County, Colorado
- Hughes County: Oklahoma; South Dakota
- Humacao Municipality, Puerto Rico
- Humboldt County: California; Iowa; Nevada
- Humphreys County: Mississippi; Tennessee
- Hunt County, Texas
- Hunterdon County, New Jersey
- Huntingdon County, Pennsylvania
- Huntington County, Indiana
- Huron County: Michigan; Ohio
- Hutchinson County: South Dakota; Texas
- Hyde County: North Carolina; South Dakota

== I ==
- Iberia Parish, Louisiana
- Iberville Parish, Louisiana
- Ida County, Iowa
- Idaho County, Idaho
- Imperial County, California
- Independence County, Arkansas
- Indian River County, Florida
- Indiana County, Pennsylvania
- Ingham County, Michigan
- Inyo County, California
- Ionia County, Michigan
- Iosco County, Michigan
- Iowa County: Iowa; Wisconsin
- Iredell County, North Carolina
- Irion County, Texas
- Iron County: Michigan; Missouri; Utah; Wisconsin
- Iroquois County, Illinois
- Irwin County, Georgia
- Isabela Municipality, Puerto Rico
- Isabella County, Michigan
- Isanti County, Minnesota
- Island County, Washington
- Isle of Wight County, Virginia
- Issaquena County, Mississippi
- Itasca County, Minnesota
- Itawamba County, Mississippi
- Izard County, Arkansas

== J ==
- Jack County, Texas
- Jackson County: Alabama; Arkansas; Colorado; Florida; Georgia; Illinois; Indiana; Iowa; Kansas; Kentucky; Michigan; Minnesota; Mississippi; Missouri; North Carolina; Ohio; Oklahoma; Oregon; South Dakota; Tennessee; Texas; West Virginia; Wisconsin
- Jackson Parish, Louisiana
- James City County, Virginia
- Jarvis Island, U.S. Minor Outlying Islands
- Jasper County: Georgia; Illinois; Indiana; Iowa; Mississippi; Missouri; South Carolina; Texas
- Jay County, Indiana
- Jayuya Municipality, Puerto Rico
- Jeff Davis County: Georgia; Texas
- Jefferson County: Alabama; Arkansas; Colorado; Florida; Georgia; Idaho; Illinois; Indiana; Iowa; Kansas; Kentucky; Mississippi; Missouri; Montana; Nebraska; New York; Ohio; Oklahoma; Oregon; Pennsylvania; Tennessee; Texas; Washington; West Virginia; Wisconsin
- Jefferson Parish, Louisiana
- Jefferson Davis County, Mississippi
- Jefferson Davis Parish, Louisiana
- Jenkins County, Georgia
- Jennings County, Indiana
- Jerauld County, South Dakota
- Jerome County, Idaho
- Jersey County, Illinois
- Jessamine County, Kentucky
- Jewell County, Kansas
- Jim Hogg County, Texas
- Jim Wells County, Texas
- Jo Daviess County, Illinois
- Johnson County: Arkansas; Georgia; Illinois; Indiana; Iowa; Kansas; Kentucky; Missouri; Nebraska; Tennessee; Texas; Wyoming
- Johnston Atoll, U.S. Minor Outlying Islands
- Johnston County: North Carolina; Oklahoma
- Jones County: Georgia; Iowa; Mississippi; North Carolina; South Dakota; Texas
- Josephine County, Oregon
- Juab County, Utah
- Juana Díaz Municipality, Puerto Rico
- Judith Basin County, Montana
- Juncos Municipality, Puerto Rico
- Juneau County, Wisconsin
- Juneau, Alaska (Note: The City and Borough of Juneau, Alaska has a fully consolidated city and borough government.)
- Juniata County, Pennsylvania

== K ==
- Kalamazoo County, Michigan
- Kalawao County, Hawaii
- Kalkaska County, Michigan
- Kanabec County, Minnesota
- Kanawha County, West Virginia
- Kandiyohi County, Minnesota
- Kane County: Illinois; Utah
- Kankakee County, Illinois
- Karnes County, Texas
- Kauaʻi County, Hawaii
- Kaufman County, Texas
- Kay County, Oklahoma
- Kearney County, Nebraska
- Kearny County, Kansas
- Keith County, Nebraska
- Kemper County, Mississippi
- Kenai Peninsula Borough, Alaska
- Kendall County: Illinois; Texas
- Kenedy County, Texas
- Kennebec County, Maine
- Kenosha County, Wisconsin
- Kent County: Delaware; Maryland; Michigan; Rhode Island; Texas
- Kenton County, Kentucky
- Keokuk County, Iowa
- Kern County, California
- Kerr County, Texas
- Kershaw County, South Carolina
- Ketchikan Gateway Borough, Alaska
- Kewaunee County, Wisconsin
- Keweenaw County, Michigan
- Keya Paha County, Nebraska
- Kidder County, North Dakota
- Kimball County, Nebraska
- Kimble County, Texas
- King County: Texas; Washington
- King George County, Virginia
- King William County, Virginia
- King and Queen County, Virginia
- Kingfisher County, Oklahoma
- Kingman County, Kansas
- Kingman Reef, U.S. Minor Outlying Islands
- Kings County: California; New York
- Kingsbury County, South Dakota
- Kinney County, Texas
- Kiowa County: Colorado; Kansas; Oklahoma
- Kit Carson County, Colorado
- Kitsap County, Washington
- Kittitas County, Washington
- Kittson County, Minnesota
- Klamath County, Oregon
- Kleberg County, Texas
- Klickitat County, Washington
- Knott County, Kentucky
- Knox County: Illinois; Indiana; Kentucky; Maine; Missouri; Nebraska; Ohio; Tennessee; Texas
- Kodiak Island Borough, Alaska
- Koochiching County, Minnesota
- Kootenai County, Idaho
- Kosciusko County, Indiana
- Kossuth County, Iowa
- Kusilvak Census Area, Alaska

== L ==
- La Crosse County, Wisconsin
- La Paz County, Arizona
- La Plata County, Colorado
- La Salle County, Texas
- La Salle Parish, Louisiana
- Labette County, Kansas
- Lac qui Parle County, Minnesota
- Lackawanna County, Pennsylvania
- Laclede County, Missouri
- Lafayette County: Arkansas; Florida; Mississippi; Missouri; Wisconsin
- Lafayette Parish, Louisiana
- Lafourche Parish, Louisiana
- LaGrange County, Indiana
- Lajas Municipality, Puerto Rico
- Lake County: California; Colorado; Florida; Illinois; Indiana; Michigan; Minnesota; Montana; Ohio; Oregon; South Dakota; Tennessee
- Lake and Peninsula Borough, Alaska
- Lake of the Woods County, Minnesota
- Lamar County: Alabama; Georgia; Mississippi; Texas
- Lamb County, Texas
- Lamoille County, Vermont
- LaMoure County, North Dakota
- Lampasas County, Texas
- Lancaster County: Nebraska; Pennsylvania; South Carolina; Virginia
- Lander County, Nevada
- Lane County: Kansas; Oregon
- Langlade County, Wisconsin
- Lanier County, Georgia
- Lapeer County, Michigan
- LaPorte County, Indiana
- Laramie County, Wyoming
- Lares Municipality, Puerto Rico
- Larimer County, Colorado
- LaRue County, Kentucky
- LaSalle County, Illinois
- Las Animas County, Colorado
- Las Marías Municipality, Puerto Rico
- Las Piedras Municipality, Puerto Rico
- Lassen County, California
- Latah County, Idaho
- Latimer County, Oklahoma
- Lauderdale County: Alabama; Mississippi; Tennessee
- Laurel County, Kentucky
- Laurens County: Georgia; South Carolina
- Lavaca County, Texas
- Lawrence County: Alabama; Arkansas; Illinois; Indiana; Kentucky; Mississippi; Missouri; Ohio; Pennsylvania; South Dakota; Tennessee
- Le Flore County, Oklahoma
- Le Sueur County, Minnesota
- Lea County, New Mexico
- Leake County, Mississippi
- Leavenworth County, Kansas
- Lebanon County, Pennsylvania
- Lee County: Alabama; Arkansas; Florida; Georgia; Illinois; Iowa; Kentucky; Mississippi; North Carolina; South Carolina; Texas; Virginia
- Leelanau County, Michigan
- Leflore County, Mississippi
- Lehigh County, Pennsylvania
- Lemhi County, Idaho
- Lenawee County, Michigan
- Lenoir County, North Carolina
- Leon County: Florida; Texas
- Leslie County, Kentucky
- Letcher County, Kentucky
- Levy County, Florida
- Lewis County: Idaho; Kentucky; Missouri; New York; Tennessee; Washington; West Virginia
- Lewis and Clark County, Montana
- Lexington, Virginia
- Lexington County, South Carolina
- Liberty County: Florida; Georgia; Montana; Texas
- Licking County, Ohio
- Limestone County: Alabama; Texas
- Lincoln County: Arkansas; Colorado; Georgia; Idaho; Kansas; Kentucky; Maine; Minnesota; Mississippi; Missouri; Montana; Nebraska; Nevada; New Mexico; North Carolina; Oklahoma; Oregon; South Dakota; Tennessee; Washington; West Virginia; Wisconsin; Wyoming
- Lincoln Parish, Louisiana
- Linn County: Iowa; Kansas; Missouri; Oregon
- Lipscomb County, Texas
- Litchfield County, Connecticut
- Little River County, Arkansas
- Live Oak County, Texas
- Livingston County: Illinois; Kentucky; Michigan; Missouri; New York
- Livingston Parish, Louisiana
- Llano County, Texas
- Logan County: Arkansas; Colorado; Illinois; Kansas; Kentucky; Nebraska; North Dakota; Ohio; Oklahoma; West Virginia
- Loíza Municipality, Puerto Rico
- Long County, Georgia
- Lonoke County, Arkansas
- Lorain County, Ohio
- Los Alamos County, New Mexico
- Los Angeles County, California
- Loudon County, Tennessee
- Loudoun County, Virginia
- Louisa County: Iowa; Virginia
- Loup County, Nebraska
- Love County, Oklahoma
- Loving County, Texas
- Lower Connecticut River Valley Planning Region, Connecticut
- Lowndes County: Alabama; Georgia; Mississippi
- Lubbock County, Texas
- Lucas County: Iowa; Ohio
- Luce County, Michigan
- Lumpkin County, Georgia
- Luna County, New Mexico
- Lunenburg County, Virginia
- Luquillo Municipality, Puerto Rico
- Luzerne County, Pennsylvania
- Lycoming County, Pennsylvania
- Lyman County, South Dakota
- Lynchburg, Virginia
- Lynn County, Texas
- Lyon County: Iowa; Kansas; Kentucky; Minnesota; Nevada

== M ==
- Mackinac County, Michigan
- Macomb County, Michigan
- Macon County: Alabama; Georgia; Illinois; Missouri; North Carolina; Tennessee
- Macoupin County, Illinois
- Madera County, California
- Madison County: Alabama; Arkansas; Florida; Georgia; Idaho; Illinois; Indiana; Iowa; Kentucky; Mississippi; Missouri; Montana; Nebraska; New York; North Carolina; Ohio; Tennessee; Texas; Virginia
- Madison Parish, Louisiana
- Magoffin County, Kentucky
- Mahaska County, Iowa
- Mahnomen County, Minnesota
- Mahoning County, Ohio
- Major County, Oklahoma
- Malheur County, Oregon
- Manassas, Virginia
- Manassas Park, Virginia
- Manatee County, Florida
- Manatí Municipality, Puerto Rico
- Manistee County, Michigan
- Manitowoc County, Wisconsin
- Manu'a District, American Samoa
- Marathon County, Wisconsin
- Marengo County, Alabama
- Maricao Municipality, Puerto Rico
- Maricopa County, Arizona
- Maries County, Missouri
- Marin County, California
- Marinette County, Wisconsin
- Marion County: Alabama; Arkansas; Florida; Georgia; Illinois; Indiana; Iowa; Kansas; Kentucky; Mississippi; Missouri; Ohio; Oregon; South Carolina; Tennessee; Texas; West Virginia
- Mariposa County, California
- Marlboro County, South Carolina
- Marquette County: Michigan; Wisconsin
- Marshall County: Alabama; Illinois; Indiana; Iowa; Kansas; Kentucky; Minnesota; Mississippi; Oklahoma; South Dakota; Tennessee; West Virginia
- Martin County: Florida; Indiana; Kentucky; Minnesota; North Carolina; Texas
- Martinsville, Virginia
- Mason County: Illinois; Kentucky; Michigan; Texas; Washington; West Virginia
- Massac County, Illinois
- Matagorda County, Texas
- Matanuska-Susitna Borough, Alaska
- Mathews County, Virginia
- Maui County, Hawaii
- Maunabo Municipality, Puerto Rico
- Maury County, Tennessee
- Maverick County, Texas
- Mayagüez Municipality, Puerto Rico
- Mayes County, Oklahoma
- McClain County, Oklahoma
- McCone County, Montana
- McCook County, South Dakota
- McCormick County, South Carolina
- McCracken County, Kentucky
- McCreary County, Kentucky
- McCulloch County, Texas
- McCurtain County, Oklahoma
- McDonald County, Missouri
- McDonough County, Illinois
- McDowell County: North Carolina; West Virginia
- McDuffie County, Georgia
- McHenry County: Illinois; North Dakota
- McIntosh County: Georgia; North Dakota; Oklahoma
- McKean County, Pennsylvania
- McKenzie County, North Dakota
- McKinley County, New Mexico
- McLean County: Illinois; Kentucky; North Dakota
- McLennan County, Texas
- McLeod County, Minnesota
- McMinn County, Tennessee
- McMullen County, Texas
- McNairy County, Tennessee
- McPherson County: Kansas; Nebraska; South Dakota
- Meade County: Kansas; Kentucky; South Dakota
- Meagher County, Montana
- Mecklenburg County: North Carolina; Virginia
- Mecosta County, Michigan
- Medina County: Ohio; Texas
- Meeker County, Minnesota
- Meigs County: Ohio; Tennessee
- Mellette County, South Dakota
- Menard County: Illinois; Texas
- Mendocino County, California
- Menifee County, Kentucky
- Menominee County: Michigan; Wisconsin
- Merced County, California
- Mercer County: Illinois; Kentucky; Missouri; New Jersey; North Dakota; Ohio; Pennsylvania; West Virginia
- Meriwether County, Georgia
- Merrick County, Nebraska
- Merrimack County, New Hampshire
- Mesa County, Colorado
- Metcalfe County, Kentucky
- Miami County: Indiana; Kansas; Ohio
- Miami-Dade County, Florida
- Middlesex County: Connecticut; Massachusetts; New Jersey; Virginia
- Midland County: Michigan; Texas
- Midway Atoll, U.S. Minor Outlying Islands
- Mifflin County, Pennsylvania
- Milam County, Texas
- Millard County, Utah
- Mille Lacs County, Minnesota
- Miller County: Arkansas; Georgia; Missouri
- Mills County: Iowa; Texas
- Milwaukee County, Wisconsin
- Miner County, South Dakota
- Mineral County: Colorado; Montana; Nevada; West Virginia
- Mingo County, West Virginia
- Minidoka County, Idaho
- Minnehaha County, South Dakota
- Missaukee County, Michigan
- Mississippi County: Arkansas; Missouri
- Missoula County, Montana
- Mitchell County: Georgia; Iowa; Kansas; North Carolina; Texas
- Mobile County, Alabama
- Moca Municipality, Puerto Rico
- Modoc County, California
- Moffat County, Colorado
- Mohave County, Arizona
- Moniteau County, Missouri
- Monmouth County, New Jersey
- Mono County, California
- Monona County, Iowa
- Monongalia County, West Virginia
- Monroe County: Alabama; Arkansas; Florida; Georgia; Illinois; Indiana; Iowa; Kentucky; Michigan; Mississippi; Missouri; New York; Ohio; Pennsylvania; Tennessee; West Virginia; Wisconsin
- Montague County, Texas
- Montcalm County, Michigan
- Monterey County, California
- Montezuma County, Colorado
- Montgomery County: Alabama; Arkansas; Georgia; Illinois; Indiana; Iowa; Kansas; Kentucky; Maryland; Mississippi; Missouri; New York; North Carolina; Ohio; Pennsylvania; Tennessee; Texas; Virginia
- Montmorency County, Michigan
- Montour County, Pennsylvania
- Montrose County, Colorado
- Moody County, South Dakota
- Moore County: North Carolina; Tennessee; Texas
- Mora County, New Mexico
- Morehouse Parish, Louisiana
- Morgan County: Alabama; Colorado; Georgia; Illinois; Indiana; Kentucky; Missouri; Ohio; Tennessee; Utah; West Virginia
- Morovis Municipality, Puerto Rico
- Morrill County, Nebraska
- Morris County: Kansas; New Jersey; Texas
- Morrison County, Minnesota
- Morrow County: Ohio; Oregon
- Morton County: Kansas; North Dakota
- Motley County, Texas
- Moultrie County, Illinois
- Mountrail County, North Dakota
- Mower County, Minnesota
- Muhlenberg County, Kentucky
- Multnomah County, Oregon
- Murray County: Georgia; Minnesota; Oklahoma
- Muscatine County, Iowa
- Muscogee County, Georgia
- Muskegon County, Michigan
- Muskingum County, Ohio
- Muskogee County, Oklahoma
- Musselshell County, Montana

== N ==
- Nacogdoches County, Texas
- Naguabo Municipality, Puerto Rico
- Nance County, Nebraska
- Nantucket, Massachusetts (Note: The Town and County of Nantucket, Massachusetts has a fully consolidated town and county government.)
- Napa County, California
- Naranjito Municipality, Puerto Rico
- Nash County, North Carolina
- Nassau County: Florida; New York
- Natchitoches Parish, Louisiana
- Natrona County, Wyoming
- Naugatuck Valley Planning Region, Connecticut
- Navajo County, Arizona
- Navarro County, Texas
- Navassa Island, U.S. Minor Outlying Islands
- Nelson County: Kentucky; North Dakota; Virginia
- Nemaha County: Kansas; Nebraska
- Neosho County, Kansas
- Neshoba County, Mississippi
- Ness County, Kansas
- Nevada County: Arkansas; California
- New Castle County, Delaware
- New Hanover County, North Carolina
- New Haven County, Connecticut
- New Kent County, Virginia
- New London County, Connecticut
- New Madrid County, Missouri
- New York County, New York
- Newaygo County, Michigan
- Newberry County, South Carolina
- Newport County, Rhode Island
- Newport News, Virginia
- Newton County: Arkansas; Georgia; Indiana; Mississippi; Missouri; Texas
- Nez Perce County, Idaho
- Niagara County, New York
- Nicholas County: Kentucky; West Virginia
- Nicollet County, Minnesota
- Niobrara County, Wyoming
- Noble County: Indiana; Ohio; Oklahoma
- Nobles County, Minnesota
- Nodaway County, Missouri
- Nolan County, Texas
- Nome Census Area, Alaska
- Norfolk, Virginia
- Norfolk County, Massachusetts
- Norman County, Minnesota
- North Slope Borough, Alaska
- Northampton County: North Carolina; Pennsylvania; Virginia
- Northeastern Connecticut Planning Region, Connecticut
- Northern Islands Municipality, Northern Mariana Islands
- Northumberland County: Pennsylvania; Virginia
- Northwest Arctic Borough, Alaska
- Northwest Hills Planning Region, Connecticut
- Norton, Virginia
- Norton County, Kansas
- Nottoway County, Virginia
- Nowata County, Oklahoma
- Noxubee County, Mississippi
- Nuckolls County, Nebraska
- Nueces County, Texas
- Nye County, Nevada

== O ==
- O'Brien County, Iowa
- Oakland County, Michigan
- Obion County, Tennessee
- Ocean County, New Jersey
- Oceana County, Michigan
- Ochiltree County, Texas
- Oconee County: Georgia; South Carolina
- Oconto County, Wisconsin
- Ogemaw County, Michigan
- Oglala Lakota County, South Dakota
- Ogle County, Illinois
- Oglethorpe County, Georgia
- Ohio County: Indiana; Kentucky; West Virginia
- Okaloosa County, Florida
- Okanogan County, Washington
- Okeechobee County, Florida
- Okfuskee County, Oklahoma
- Oklahoma County, Oklahoma
- Okmulgee County, Oklahoma
- Oktibbeha County, Mississippi
- Oldham County: Kentucky; Texas
- Oliver County, North Dakota
- Olmsted County, Minnesota
- Oneida County: Idaho; New York; Wisconsin
- Onondaga County, New York
- Onslow County, North Carolina
- Ontario County, New York
- Ontonagon County, Michigan
- Orange County: California; Florida; Indiana; New York; North Carolina; Texas; Vermont; Virginia
- Orangeburg County, South Carolina
- Oregon County, Missouri
- Orleans County: New York; Vermont
- Orleans Parish, Louisiana
- Orocovis Municipality, Puerto Rico
- Osage County: Kansas; Missouri; Oklahoma
- Osborne County, Kansas
- Osceola County: Florida; Iowa; Michigan
- Oscoda County, Michigan
- Oswego County, New York
- Otero County: Colorado; New Mexico
- Otoe County, Nebraska
- Otsego County: Michigan; New York
- Ottawa County: Kansas; Michigan; Ohio; Oklahoma
- Otter Tail County, Minnesota
- Ouachita County, Arkansas
- Ouachita Parish, Louisiana
- Ouray County, Colorado
- Outagamie County, Wisconsin
- Overton County, Tennessee
- Owen County: Indiana; Kentucky
- Owsley County, Kentucky
- Owyhee County, Idaho
- Oxford County, Maine
- Ozark County, Missouri
- Ozaukee County, Wisconsin

== P ==
- Pacific County, Washington
- Page County: Iowa; Virginia
- Palm Beach County, Florida
- Palmyra Atoll, U.S. Minor Outlying Islands
- Palo Alto County, Iowa
- Palo Pinto County, Texas
- Pamlico County, North Carolina
- Panola County: Mississippi; Texas
- Park County: Colorado; Montana; Wyoming
- Parke County, Indiana
- Parker County, Texas
- Parmer County, Texas
- Pasco County, Florida
- Pasquotank County, North Carolina
- Passaic County, New Jersey
- Patillas Municipality, Puerto Rico
- Patrick County, Virginia
- Paulding County: Georgia; Ohio
- Pawnee County: Kansas; Nebraska; Oklahoma
- Payette County, Idaho
- Payne County, Oklahoma
- Peach County, Georgia
- Pearl River County, Mississippi
- Pecos County, Texas
- Pembina County, North Dakota
- Pemiscot County, Missouri
- Pend Oreille County, Washington
- Pender County, North Carolina
- Pendleton County: Kentucky; West Virginia
- Pennington County: Minnesota; South Dakota
- Penobscot County, Maine
- Peñuelas Municipality, Puerto Rico
- Peoria County, Illinois
- Pepin County, Wisconsin
- Perkins County: Nebraska; South Dakota
- Perquimans County, North Carolina
- Perry County: Alabama; Arkansas; Illinois; Indiana; Kentucky; Mississippi; Missouri; Ohio; Pennsylvania; Tennessee
- Pershing County, Nevada
- Person County, North Carolina
- Petersburg, Virginia
- Petersburg Borough, Alaska
- Petroleum County, Montana
- Pettis County, Missouri
- Phelps County: Missouri; Nebraska
- Philadelphia County, Pennsylvania
- Phillips County: Arkansas; Colorado; Kansas; Montana
- Piatt County, Illinois
- Pickaway County, Ohio
- Pickens County: Alabama; Georgia; South Carolina
- Pickett County, Tennessee
- Pierce County: Georgia; Nebraska; North Dakota; Washington; Wisconsin
- Pike County: Alabama; Arkansas; Georgia; Illinois; Indiana; Kentucky; Mississippi; Missouri; Ohio; Pennsylvania
- Pima County, Arizona
- Pinal County, Arizona
- Pine County, Minnesota
- Pinellas County, Florida
- Pipestone County, Minnesota
- Piscataquis County, Maine
- Pitkin County, Colorado
- Pitt County, North Carolina
- Pittsburg County, Oklahoma
- Pittsylvania County, Virginia
- Piute County, Utah
- Placer County, California
- Plaquemines Parish, Louisiana
- Platte County: Missouri; Nebraska; Wyoming
- Pleasants County, West Virginia
- Plumas County, California
- Plymouth County: Iowa; Massachusetts
- Pocahontas County: Iowa; West Virginia
- Poinsett County, Arkansas
- Pointe Coupee Parish, Louisiana
- Polk County: Arkansas; Florida; Georgia; Iowa; Minnesota; Missouri; Nebraska; North Carolina; Oregon; Tennessee; Texas; Wisconsin
- Ponce Municipality, Puerto Rico
- Pondera County, Montana
- Pontotoc County: Mississippi; Oklahoma
- Pope County: Arkansas; Illinois; Minnesota
- Poquoson, Virginia
- Portage County: Ohio; Wisconsin
- Porter County, Indiana
- Portsmouth, Virginia
- Posey County, Indiana
- Pottawatomie County: Kansas; Oklahoma
- Pottawattamie County, Iowa
- Potter County: Pennsylvania; South Dakota; Texas
- Powder River County, Montana
- Powell County: Kentucky; Montana
- Power County, Idaho
- Poweshiek County, Iowa
- Powhatan County, Virginia
- Prairie County: Arkansas; Montana
- Pratt County, Kansas
- Preble County, Ohio
- Prentiss County, Mississippi
- Presidio County, Texas
- Presque Isle County, Michigan
- Preston County, West Virginia
- Price County, Wisconsin
- Prince Edward County, Virginia
- Prince George County, Virginia
- Prince George's County, Maryland
- Prince William County, Virginia
- Prince of Wales – Hyder Census Area, Alaska
- Providence County, Rhode Island
- Prowers County, Colorado
- Pueblo County, Colorado
- Pulaski County: Arkansas; Georgia; Illinois; Indiana; Kentucky; Missouri; Virginia
- Pushmataha County, Oklahoma
- Putnam County: Florida; Georgia; Illinois; Indiana; Missouri; New York; Ohio; Tennessee; West Virginia

== Q ==
- Quay County, New Mexico
- Quebradillas Municipality, Puerto Rico
- Queen Anne's County, Maryland
- Queens County, New York
- Quitman County: Georgia; Mississippi

== R ==
- Rabun County, Georgia
- Racine County, Wisconsin
- Radford, Virginia
- Rains County, Texas
- Raleigh County, West Virginia
- Ralls County, Missouri
- Ramsey County: Minnesota; North Dakota
- Randall County, Texas
- Randolph County: Alabama; Arkansas; Georgia; Illinois; Indiana; Missouri; North Carolina; West Virginia
- Rankin County, Mississippi
- Ransom County, North Dakota
- Rapides Parish, Louisiana
- Rappahannock County, Virginia
- Ravalli County, Montana
- Rawlins County, Kansas
- Ray County, Missouri
- Reagan County, Texas
- Real County, Texas
- Red Lake County, Minnesota
- Red River County, Texas
- Red River Parish, Louisiana
- Red Willow County, Nebraska
- Redwood County, Minnesota
- Reeves County, Texas
- Refugio County, Texas
- Reno County, Kansas
- Rensselaer County, New York
- Renville County: Minnesota; North Dakota
- Republic County, Kansas
- Reynolds County, Missouri
- Rhea County, Tennessee
- Rice County: Kansas; Minnesota
- Rich County, Utah
- Richardson County, Nebraska
- Richland County: Illinois; Montana; North Dakota; Ohio; South Carolina; Wisconsin
- Richland Parish, Louisiana
- Richmond, Virginia
- Richmond County: Georgia; New York; North Carolina; Virginia
- Riley County, Kansas
- Rincón Municipality, Puerto Rico
- Ringgold County, Iowa
- Rio Arriba County, New Mexico
- Rio Blanco County, Colorado
- Rio Grande County, Colorado
- Río Grande Municipality, Puerto Rico
- Ripley County: Indiana; Missouri
- Ritchie County, West Virginia
- Riverside County, California
- Roane County: Tennessee; West Virginia
- Roanoke, Virginia
- Roanoke County, Virginia
- Roberts County: South Dakota; Texas
- Robertson County: Kentucky; Tennessee; Texas
- Robeson County, North Carolina
- Rock County: Minnesota; Nebraska; Wisconsin
- Rock Island County, Illinois
- Rockbridge County, Virginia
- Rockcastle County, Kentucky
- Rockdale County, Georgia
- Rockingham County: New Hampshire; North Carolina; Virginia
- Rockland County, New York
- Rockwall County, Texas
- Roger Mills County, Oklahoma
- Rogers County, Oklahoma
- Rolette County, North Dakota
- Rooks County, Kansas
- Roosevelt County: Montana; New Mexico
- Roscommon County, Michigan
- Rose Atoll, American Samoa
- Roseau County, Minnesota
- Rosebud County, Montana
- Ross County, Ohio
- Rota Municipality, Northern Mariana Islands
- Routt County, Colorado
- Rowan County: Kentucky; North Carolina
- Runnels County, Texas
- Rush County: Indiana; Kansas
- Rusk County: Texas; Wisconsin
- Russell County: Alabama; Kansas; Kentucky; Virginia
- Rutherford County: North Carolina; Tennessee
- Rutland County, Vermont

== S ==
- Sabana Grande Municipality, Puerto Rico
- Sabine County, Texas
- Sabine Parish, Louisiana
- Sac County, Iowa
- Sacramento County, California
- Sagadahoc County, Maine
- Saginaw County, Michigan
- Saguache County, Colorado
- Saint Bernard Parish, Louisiana
- Saint Charles County, Missouri
- Saint Charles Parish, Louisiana
- Saint Clair County: Alabama; Illinois; Michigan; Missouri
- Saint Croix County, Wisconsin
- Saint Croix Island, U.S. Virgin Islands
- Saint Francis County, Arkansas
- Saint Francois County, Missouri
- Saint Helena Parish, Louisiana
- Saint James Parish, Louisiana
- Saint John Island, U.S. Virgin Islands
- Saint John the Baptist Parish, Louisiana
- Saint Johns County, Florida
- Saint Joseph County: Indiana; Michigan
- Saint Landry Parish, Louisiana
- Saint Lawrence County, New York
- St. Louis, Missouri
- Saint Louis County: Minnesota; Missouri
- Saint Lucie County, Florida
- Saint Martin Parish, Louisiana
- Saint Mary Parish, Louisiana
- Saint Mary's County, Maryland
- Saint Tammany Parish, Louisiana
- Saint Thomas Island, U.S. Virgin Islands
- Sainte Genevieve County, Missouri
- Saipan Municipality, Northern Mariana Islands
- Salem, Virginia
- Salem County, New Jersey
- Salinas Municipality, Puerto Rico
- Saline County: Arkansas; Illinois; Kansas; Missouri; Nebraska
- Salt Lake County, Utah
- Saluda County, South Carolina
- Sampson County, North Carolina
- San Augustine County, Texas
- San Benito County, California
- San Bernardino County, California
- San Diego County, California
- San Francisco, California (Note: The City and County of San Francisco, California has a fully consolidated city and county government.)
- San Germán Municipality, Puerto Rico
- San Jacinto County, Texas
- San Joaquin County, California
- San Juan County: Colorado; New Mexico; Utah; Washington
- San Juan Municipality, Puerto Rico
- San Lorenzo Municipality, Puerto Rico
- San Luis Obispo County, California
- San Mateo County, California
- San Miguel County: Colorado; New Mexico
- San Patricio County, Texas
- San Saba County, Texas
- San Sebastián Municipality, Puerto Rico
- Sanborn County, South Dakota
- Sanders County, Montana
- Sandoval County, New Mexico
- Sandusky County, Ohio
- Sangamon County, Illinois
- Sanilac County, Michigan
- Sanpete County, Utah
- Santa Barbara County, California
- Santa Clara County, California
- Santa Cruz County: Arizona; California
- Santa Fe County, New Mexico
- Santa Isabel Municipality, Puerto Rico
- Santa Rosa County, Florida
- Sarasota County, Florida
- Saratoga County, New York
- Sargent County, North Dakota
- Sarpy County, Nebraska
- Sauk County, Wisconsin
- Saunders County, Nebraska
- Sawyer County, Wisconsin
- Schenectady County, New York
- Schleicher County, Texas
- Schley County, Georgia
- Schoharie County, New York
- Schoolcraft County, Michigan
- Schuyler County: Illinois; Missouri; New York
- Schuylkill County, Pennsylvania
- Scioto County, Ohio
- Scotland County: Missouri; North Carolina
- Scott County: Arkansas; Illinois; Indiana; Iowa; Kansas; Kentucky; Minnesota; Mississippi; Missouri; Tennessee; Virginia
- Scotts Bluff County, Nebraska
- Screven County, Georgia
- Scurry County, Texas
- Searcy County, Arkansas
- Sebastian County, Arkansas
- Sedgwick County: Colorado; Kansas
- Seminole County: Florida; Georgia; Oklahoma
- Seneca County: New York; Ohio
- Sequatchie County, Tennessee
- Sequoyah County, Oklahoma
- Sevier County: Arkansas; Tennessee; Utah
- Seward County: Kansas; Nebraska
- Shackelford County, Texas
- Shannon County, Missouri
- Sharkey County, Mississippi
- Sharp County, Arkansas
- Shasta County, California
- Shawano County, Wisconsin
- Shawnee County, Kansas
- Sheboygan County, Wisconsin
- Shelby County: Alabama; Illinois; Indiana; Iowa; Kentucky; Missouri; Ohio; Tennessee; Texas
- Shenandoah County, Virginia
- Sherburne County, Minnesota
- Sheridan County: Kansas; Montana; Nebraska; North Dakota; Wyoming
- Sherman County: Kansas; Nebraska; Oregon; Texas
- Shiawassee County, Michigan
- Shoshone County, Idaho
- Sibley County, Minnesota
- Sierra County: California; New Mexico
- Silver Bow County, Montana
- Simpson County: Kentucky; Mississippi
- Sioux County: Iowa; Nebraska; North Dakota
- Siskiyou County, California
- Sitka, Alaska (Note: The City and Borough of Sitka, Alaska has a fully consolidated city and borough government.)
- Skagit County, Washington
- Skagway-Hoonah-Angoon Census Area, Alaska
- Skamania County, Washington
- Slope County, North Dakota
- Smith County: Kansas; Mississippi; Tennessee; Texas
- Smyth County, Virginia
- Snohomish County, Washington
- Snyder County, Pennsylvania
- Socorro County, New Mexico
- Solano County, California
- Somerset County: Maine; Maryland; New Jersey; Pennsylvania
- Somervell County, Texas
- Sonoma County, California
- South Central Connecticut Planning Region, Connecticut
- Southampton County, Virginia
- Southeast Fairbanks Census Area, Alaska
- Southeastern Connecticut Planning Region, Connecticut
- Spalding County, Georgia
- Spartanburg County, South Carolina
- Spencer County: Indiana; Kentucky
- Spink County, South Dakota
- Spokane County, Washington
- Spotsylvania County, Virginia
- Stafford County: Kansas; Virginia
- Stanislaus County, California
- Stanley County, South Dakota
- Stanly County, North Carolina
- Stanton County: Kansas; Nebraska
- Stark County: Illinois; North Dakota; Ohio
- Starke County, Indiana
- Starr County, Texas
- Staunton, Virginia
- Stearns County, Minnesota
- Steele County: Minnesota; North Dakota
- Stephens County: Georgia; Oklahoma; Texas
- Stephenson County, Illinois
- Sterling County, Texas
- Steuben County: Indiana; New York
- Stevens County: Kansas; Minnesota; Washington
- Stewart County: Georgia; Tennessee
- Stillwater County, Montana
- Stoddard County, Missouri
- Stokes County, North Carolina
- Stone County: Arkansas; Mississippi; Missouri
- Stonewall County, Texas
- Storey County, Nevada
- Story County, Iowa
- Strafford County, New Hampshire
- Stutsman County, North Dakota
- Sublette County, Wyoming
- Suffolk, Virginia
- Suffolk County: Massachusetts; New York
- Sullivan County: Indiana; Missouri; New Hampshire; New York; Pennsylvania; Tennessee
- Sully County, South Dakota
- Summers County, West Virginia
- Summit County: Colorado; Ohio; Utah
- Sumner County: Kansas; Tennessee
- Sumter County: Alabama; Florida; Georgia; South Carolina
- Sunflower County, Mississippi
- Surry County: North Carolina; Virginia
- Susquehanna County, Pennsylvania
- Sussex County: Delaware; New Jersey; Virginia
- Sutter County, California
- Sutton County, Texas
- Suwannee County, Florida
- Swain County, North Carolina
- Swains Island, American Samoa
- Sweet Grass County, Montana
- Sweetwater County, Wyoming
- Swift County, Minnesota
- Swisher County, Texas
- Switzerland County, Indiana

== T ==
- Talbot County: Georgia; Maryland
- Taliaferro County, Georgia
- Talladega County, Alabama
- Tallahatchie County, Mississippi
- Tallapoosa County, Alabama
- Tama County, Iowa
- Taney County, Missouri
- Tangipahoa Parish, Louisiana
- Taos County, New Mexico
- Tarrant County, Texas
- Tate County, Mississippi
- Tattnall County, Georgia
- Taylor County: Florida; Georgia; Iowa; Kentucky; Texas; West Virginia; Wisconsin
- Tazewell County: Illinois; Virginia
- Tehama County, California
- Telfair County, Georgia
- Teller County, Colorado
- Tensas Parish, Louisiana
- Terrebonne Parish, Louisiana
- Terrell County: Georgia; Texas
- Terry County, Texas
- Teton County: Idaho; Montana; Wyoming
- Texas County: Missouri; Oklahoma
- Thayer County, Nebraska
- Thomas County: Georgia; Kansas; Nebraska
- Throckmorton County, Texas
- Thurston County: Nebraska; Washington
- Tift County, Georgia
- Tillamook County, Oregon
- Tillman County, Oklahoma
- Tinian Municipality, Northern Mariana Islands
- Tioga County: New York; Pennsylvania
- Tippah County, Mississippi
- Tippecanoe County, Indiana
- Tipton County: Indiana; Tennessee
- Tishomingo County, Mississippi
- Titus County, Texas
- Toa Alta Municipality, Puerto Rico
- Toa Baja Municipality, Puerto Rico
- Todd County: Kentucky; Minnesota; South Dakota
- Tolland County, Connecticut
- Tom Green County, Texas
- Tompkins County, New York
- Tooele County, Utah
- Toole County, Montana
- Toombs County, Georgia
- Torrance County, New Mexico
- Towner County, North Dakota
- Towns County, Georgia
- Traill County, North Dakota
- Transylvania County, North Carolina
- Traverse County, Minnesota
- Travis County, Texas
- Treasure County, Montana
- Trego County, Kansas
- Trempealeau County, Wisconsin
- Treutlen County, Georgia
- Trigg County, Kentucky
- Trimble County, Kentucky
- Trinity County: California; Texas
- Tripp County, South Dakota
- Troup County, Georgia
- Trousdale County, Tennessee
- Trujillo Alto Municipality, Puerto Rico
- Trumbull County, Ohio
- Tucker County, West Virginia
- Tulare County, California
- Tulsa County, Oklahoma
- Tunica County, Mississippi
- Tuolumne County, California
- Turner County: Georgia; South Dakota
- Tuscaloosa County, Alabama
- Tuscarawas County, Ohio
- Tuscola County, Michigan
- Twiggs County, Georgia
- Twin Falls County, Idaho
- Tyler County: Texas; West Virginia
- Tyrrell County, North Carolina

== U ==
- Uinta County, Wyoming
- Uintah County, Utah
- Ulster County, New York
- Umatilla County, Oregon
- Unicoi County, Tennessee
- Union County: Arkansas; Florida; Georgia; Illinois; Indiana; Iowa; Kentucky; Mississippi; New Jersey; New Mexico; North Carolina; Ohio; Oregon; Pennsylvania; South Carolina; South Dakota; Tennessee
- Union Parish, Louisiana
- Upshur County: Texas; West Virginia
- Upson County, Georgia
- Upton County, Texas
- Utah County, Utah
- Utuado Municipality, Puerto Rico
- Uvalde County, Texas

== V ==
- Val Verde County, Texas
- Valencia County, New Mexico
- Valley County: Idaho; Montana; Nebraska
- Van Buren County: Arkansas; Iowa; Michigan; Tennessee
- Van Wert County, Ohio
- Van Zandt County, Texas
- Vance County, North Carolina
- Vanderburgh County, Indiana
- Vega Alta Municipality, Puerto Rico
- Vega Baja Municipality, Puerto Rico
- Venango County, Pennsylvania
- Ventura County, California
- Vermilion County, Illinois
- Vermilion Parish, Louisiana
- Vermillion County, Indiana
- Vernon County: Missouri; Wisconsin
- Vernon Parish, Louisiana
- Victoria County, Texas
- Vieques Municipality, Puerto Rico
- Vigo County, Indiana
- Vilas County, Wisconsin
- Villalba Municipality, Puerto Rico
- Vinton County, Ohio
- Virginia Beach, Virginia
- Volusia County, Florida

== W ==
- Wabash County: Illinois; Indiana
- Wabasha County, Minnesota
- Wabaunsee County, Kansas
- Wadena County, Minnesota
- Wagoner County, Oklahoma
- Wahkiakum County, Washington
- Wake County, North Carolina
- Wake Island, U.S. Minor Outlying Islands
- Wakulla County, Florida
- Waldo County, Maine
- Walker County: Alabama; Georgia; Texas
- Walla Walla County, Washington
- Wallace County, Kansas
- Waller County, Texas
- Wallowa County, Oregon
- Walsh County, North Dakota
- Walthall County, Mississippi
- Walton County: Florida; Georgia
- Walworth County: South Dakota; Wisconsin
- Wapello County, Iowa
- Ward County: North Dakota; Texas
- Ware County, Georgia
- Warren County: Georgia; Illinois; Indiana; Iowa; Kentucky; Mississippi; Missouri; New Jersey; New York; North Carolina; Ohio; Pennsylvania; Tennessee; Virginia
- Warrick County, Indiana
- Wasatch County, Utah
- Wasco County, Oregon
- Waseca County, Minnesota
- Washakie County, Wyoming
- Washburn County, Wisconsin
- Washington County: Alabama; Arkansas; Colorado; Florida; Georgia; Idaho; Illinois; Indiana; Iowa; Kansas; Kentucky; Maine; Maryland; Minnesota; Mississippi; Missouri; Nebraska; New York; North Carolina; Ohio; Oklahoma; Oregon; Pennsylvania; Rhode Island; Tennessee; Texas; Utah; Vermont; Virginia; Wisconsin
- Washington Parish, Louisiana
- Washita County, Oklahoma
- Washoe County, Nevada
- Washtenaw County, Michigan
- Watauga County, North Carolina
- Watonwan County, Minnesota
- Waukesha County, Wisconsin
- Waupaca County, Wisconsin
- Waushara County, Wisconsin
- Wayne County: Georgia; Illinois; Indiana; Iowa; Kentucky; Michigan; Mississippi; Missouri; Nebraska; New York; North Carolina; Ohio; Pennsylvania; Tennessee; Utah; West Virginia
- Waynesboro, Virginia
- Weakley County, Tennessee
- Webb County, Texas
- Weber County, Utah
- Webster County: Georgia; Iowa; Kentucky; Mississippi; Missouri; Nebraska; West Virginia
- Webster Parish, Louisiana
- Weld County, Colorado
- Wells County: Indiana; North Dakota
- West Baton Rouge Parish, Louisiana
- West Carroll Parish, Louisiana
- West Feliciana Parish, Louisiana
- Westchester County, New York
- Western Connecticut Planning Region, Connecticut
- Western District, American Samoa
- Westmoreland County: Pennsylvania; Virginia
- Weston County, Wyoming
- Wetzel County, West Virginia
- Wexford County, Michigan
- Wharton County, Texas
- Whatcom County, Washington
- Wheatland County, Montana
- Wheeler County: Georgia; Nebraska; Oregon; Texas
- White County: Arkansas; Georgia; Illinois; Indiana; Tennessee
- White Pine County, Nevada
- Whiteside County, Illinois
- Whitfield County, Georgia
- Whitley County: Indiana; Kentucky
- Whitman County, Washington
- Wibaux County, Montana
- Wichita County: Kansas; Texas
- Wicomico County, Maryland
- Wilbarger County, Texas
- Wilcox County: Alabama; Georgia
- Wilkes County: Georgia; North Carolina
- Wilkin County, Minnesota
- Wilkinson County: Georgia; Mississippi
- Will County, Illinois
- Willacy County, Texas
- Williams County: North Dakota; Ohio
- Williamsburg, Virginia
- Williamsburg County, South Carolina
- Williamson County: Illinois; Tennessee; Texas
- Wilson County: Kansas; North Carolina; Tennessee; Texas
- Winchester, Virginia
- Windham County: Connecticut; Vermont
- Windsor County, Vermont
- Winkler County, Texas
- Winn Parish, Louisiana
- Winnebago County: Illinois; Iowa; Wisconsin
- Winneshiek County, Iowa
- Winona County, Minnesota
- Winston County: Alabama; Mississippi
- Wirt County, West Virginia
- Wise County: Texas; Virginia
- Wolfe County, Kentucky
- Wood County: Ohio; Texas; West Virginia; Wisconsin
- Woodbury County, Iowa
- Woodford County: Illinois; Kentucky
- Woodruff County, Arkansas
- Woods County, Oklahoma
- Woodson County, Kansas
- Woodward County, Oklahoma
- Worcester County: Maryland; Massachusetts
- Worth County: Georgia; Iowa; Missouri
- Wright County: Iowa; Minnesota; Missouri
- Wyandot County, Ohio
- Wyandotte County, Kansas
- Wyoming County: New York; Pennsylvania; West Virginia
- Wythe County, Virginia

== Y ==
- Yabucoa Municipality, Puerto Rico
- Yadkin County, North Carolina
- Yakima County, Washington
- Yakutat, Alaska (Note: The City and Borough of Yakutat, Alaska has a fully consolidated city and borough government.)
- Yalobusha County, Mississippi
- Yamhill County, Oregon
- Yancey County, North Carolina
- Yankton County, South Dakota
- Yates County, New York
- Yauco Municipality, Puerto Rico
- Yavapai County, Arizona
- Yazoo County, Mississippi
- Yell County, Arkansas
- Yellow Medicine County, Minnesota
- Yellowstone County, Montana
- Yoakum County, Texas
- Yolo County, California
- York County: Maine; Nebraska; Pennsylvania; South Carolina; Virginia
- Young County, Texas
- Yuba County, California
- Yukon–Koyukuk Census Area, Alaska
- Yuma County: Arizona; Colorado

== Z ==
- Zapata County, Texas
- Zavala County, Texas
- Ziebach County, South Dakota
