= Surrey County =

Surrey County may refer to:

- Surrey County, Jamaica
- Surrey, England

== See also ==
- Surry County (disambiguation)
