= USS LST-759 =

1944 LST-542-class tank landing ship

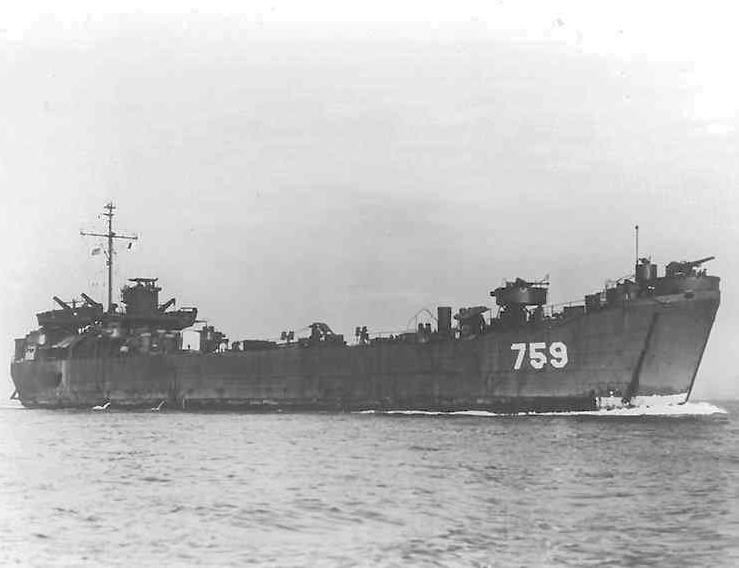
- LST-759 in San Francisco Bay, c. 1945–1946

History

United States
- Name: USS LST-759
- Builder: American Bridge Company, Ambridge, Pennsylvania
- Laid down: 11 June 1944
- Launched: 29 July 1944
- Commissioned: 25 August 1944
- Decommissioned: 29 March 1946
- Renamed: USS Eddy County (LST-759), 1 July 1955
- Stricken: 1 October 1958
- Honors and awards: 1 battle star (World War II)

General characteristics
- Class & type: LST-542-class tank landing ship
- Displacement: 1,625 long tons (1,651 t) light; 4,080 long tons (4,145 t) full
- Length: 328 ft (100 m)
- Beam: 50 ft (15 m)
- Draft: Unloaded : 2 ft 4 in (0.71 m) forward; 7 ft 6 in (2.29 m) aft; Loaded : 8 ft 2 in (2.49 m) forward; 14 ft 1 in (4.29 m) aft
- Propulsion: 2 × General Motors 12-567 diesel engines, two shafts, twin rudders
- Speed: 12 knots (22 km/h; 14 mph)
- Boats & landing craft carried: 2 LCVPs
- Troops: 16 officers, 147 enlisted men
- Complement: 7 officers, 104 enlisted men
- Armament: 1 × single 3-inch/50-caliber gun mount; 8 × 40 mm guns; 12 × 20 mm guns

USS Eddy County (LST-759) was an LST-542-class tank landing ship built for the United States Navy during World War II. Named after counties in New Mexico and North Dakota, she was the only U.S. naval vessel to bear the name.

LST-759 was laid down on 11 June 1944 at Ambridge, Pennsylvania by the American Bridge Company; launched on 29 July 1944; sponsored by Mrs. Norman Buckle Obbard; and commissioned on 25 August 1944.

== Service history ==
During World War II, LST-759 was assigned to the Asiatic-Pacific theater and participated in the assault and occupation of Okinawa Gunto in April 1945. She was decommissioned on 29 March 1946.

On 1 July 1955 the ship was redesignated USS Eddy County (LST-759). The tank landing ship was berthed at the Columbia River Group of the Pacific Reserve Fleet until struck from the Naval Vessel Register on 1 October 1958. Her final fate is unknown.

LST-759 earned one battle star for World War II service.

== See also ==
- List of United States Navy LSTs
- Eddy County, New Mexico
- Eddy County, North Dakota
