= USS Sumner County =

LST-542-class landing ship tank

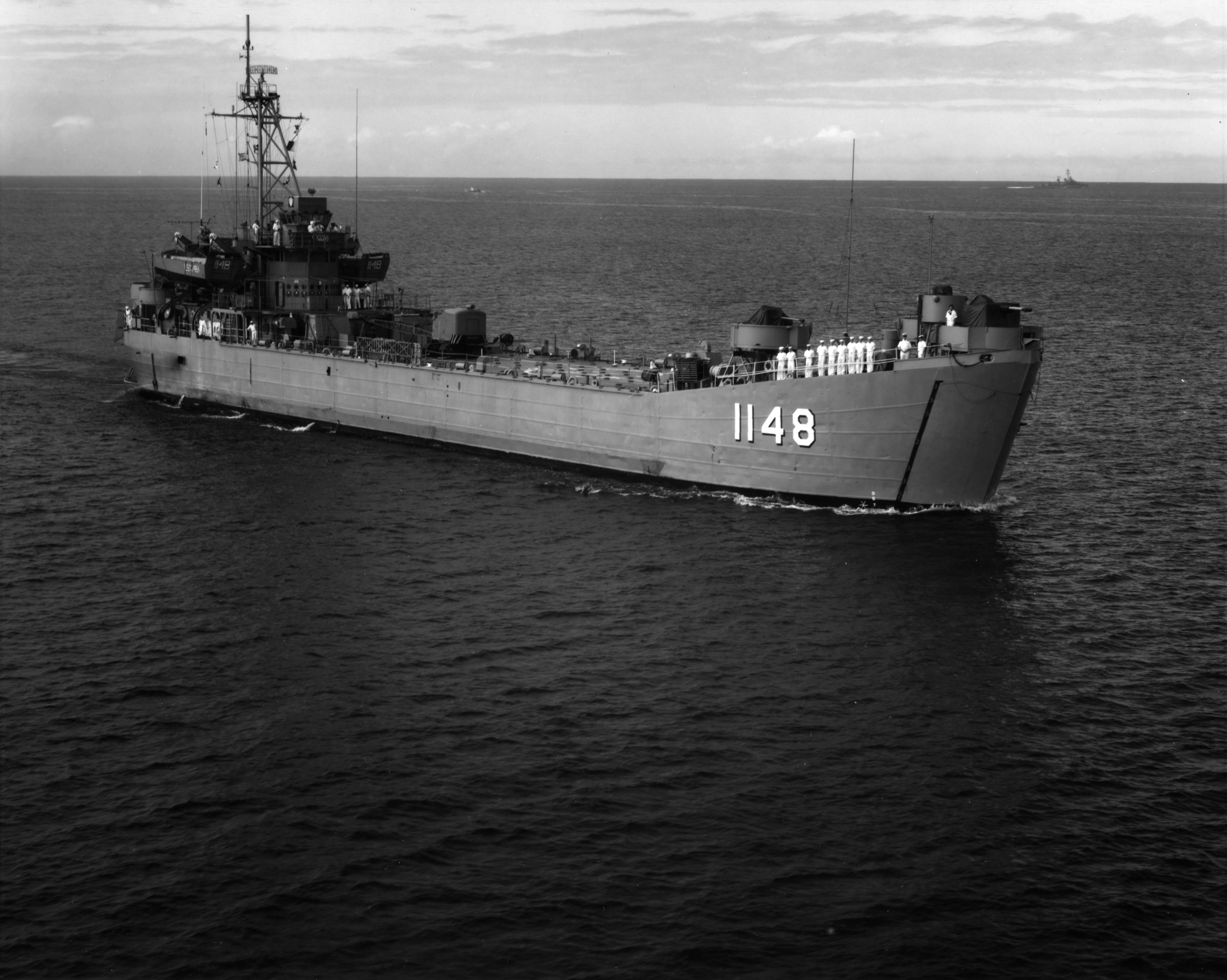
- USS Sumner County on 17 May 1968

History

United States
- Name: LST-1148
- Builder: Chicago Bridge and Iron Co., Seneca
- Laid down: 15 February 1945
- Launched: 22 May 1945
- Sponsored by: Mrs Helen M. Fay
- Commissioned: 9 June 1945
- Decommissioned: 11 May 1946
- Recommissioned: 3 October 1950
- Renamed: Sumner County
- Namesake: Sumner County
- Decommissioned: 9 October 1969
- Stricken: 15 September 1974
- Identification: Callsign: NKHC; Pennant number: LST-1148
- Fate: Scrapped, 2004
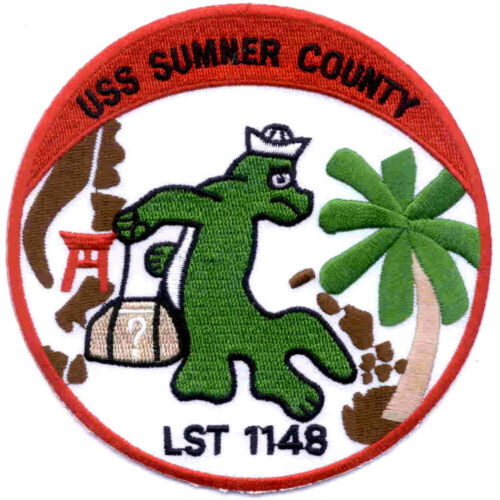
- Badge

General characteristics
- Class & type: LST-542-class tank landing ship
- Displacement: 1,625 long tons (1,651 t) light; 4,080 long tons (4,145 t) full
- Length: 328 ft (100 m)
- Beam: 50 ft (15 m)
- Draft: Unloaded : 2 ft 4 in (0.71 m) forward; 7 ft 6 in (2.29 m) aft; Loaded : 8 ft 2 in (2.49 m) forward; 14 ft 1 in (4.29 m) aft
- Propulsion: 2 × General Motors 12-567 diesel engines, two shafts, twin rudders
- Speed: 12 knots (22 km/h; 14 mph)
- Boats & landing craft carried: 2 × LCVPs
- Troops: 16 officers, 147 enlisted men
- Complement: 7 officers, 104 enlisted men
- Armament: 8 × 40 mm guns; 12 × 20 mm guns

USS Sumner County (LST-1148) was a LST-542-class tank landing ship in the United States Coast Guard during World War II.

== Construction and commissioning ==
LST-1148 was laid down on 15 February 1945 at Chicago Bridge and Iron Company, Seneca, Illinois. Launched on 22 May 1945 and commissioned on 9 June 1945.

== Service life ==
During World War II, LST-1148 was assigned to the Asiatic-Pacific theater. She was assigned to occupation and China in the Far East from 17 October to 12 December 1945.

She was decommissioned on 11 May 1946 to be mothballed in the Pacific Reserve Fleet Columbia river.

During the start of the Korean War, she was recommissioned on 3 October 1950 and participated in the Communist China Spring Offensive on 27 April 1951 and UN Summer-Fall Offensive from 4 to 5 September and 21 September to 2 October 1951. She took part also in the Second Korean Winter from 11 to 12 January 1952. In conclusion, she participated in the Korea Summer-Fall 1953 from 7 to 17 May 1953, 18 to 19 June and 26 to 27 July 1953.

On 1 July 1955, she was given the name Sumner County (LST-1148).

As the United States joined the Vietnam War, she joined the Vietnam Defense from 7 to 24 September 1965, Vietnamese Counteroffensive from 10 to 22 June 1966, Tet Counteroffensive from 12 March to 1 April 1968, Vietnamese Counteroffensive Phase II from 17 July to 26 September and 20 to 30 October 1966, Vietnamese Counteroffensive Phase IV from 25 April to 13 June 1966 and lastly, the Vietnamese Counteroffensive Phase V from 2 to July and 9 August to 6 September 1968.

== Fate ==
She was decommissioned on 9 October 1969 at Orange, Texas and mothballed at the Atlantic Reserve Fleet Orange struck from the Naval Register on 15 September 1974.

On 1 August 1975, she was sold and used by the Defense Reutilization and Marketing Service (DRMS) to Frank Ganter of Newport, Rhode Island, and was used as a storage barge at Melville Point in Portsmouth, Rhode Island until February 2004 when the ship had become derelict and was scrapped.

== Awards ==
LST-1148 have earned the following awards:

- Combat Action Ribbon (25 June 1968)
- Navy Meritorious Unit Commendation
- American Campaign Medal
- Asiatic-Pacific Campaign Medal
- World War II Victory Medal
- Navy Occupation Service Medal (with "Asia" clasp)
- National Defense Service Medal with star (2 awards)
- Korean Service Medal with 4 battle stars
- Vietnam Service Medal with 6 campaign stars
- Korean Presidential Unit Citation
- United Nations Service Medal
- Republic of Vietnam Gallantry Cross Unit Citation (5 awards)
- Republic of Korea War Service Medal (retroactive)
- Republic of Vietnam Campaign Medal
