= USS LST-400 =

1942 LST-1-class tank landing ship

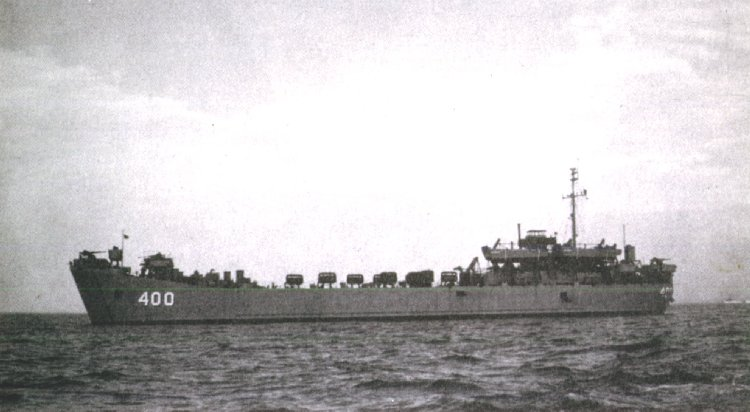

History

United States
- Name: LST-400
- Builder: Newport News Shipbuilding and Drydock Company, Newport News
- Laid down: 28 September 1942
- Launched: 23 November 1942
- Sponsored by: Mrs. Judith Flax-ington
- Commissioned: 7 January 1943
- Renamed: Bradley County, 1 July 1955
- Namesake: Bradley County
- Identification: Callsign: NDBA; Hull number: LST-400
- Honors and awards: See Awards
- Fate: Transferred to Republic of China, 30 June 1955
- Stricken: 25 April 1960

History

Taiwan
- Name: Chung Suo; (中肇)
- Acquired: 30 June 1955
- Commissioned: 29 December 1955
- Decommissioned: 1 January 2011
- Identification: Hull number: LST-217
- Fate: Sunk as target, 16 July 2018

General characteristics
- Class & type: LST-1-class tank landing ship
- Displacement: 1,625 long tons (1,651 t) light; 4,080 long tons (4,145 t) full
- Length: 328 ft (100 m)
- Beam: 50 ft (15 m)
- Draft: Unloaded: Bow: 2 ft 4 in (0.71 m); Stern: 7 ft 6 in (2.29 m); Loaded : Bow: 8 ft 2 in (2.49 m); Stern: 14 ft 1 in (4.29 m)
- Depth: 8 ft (2.4 m) forward; 14 ft 4 in (4.37 m) aft (full load)
- Propulsion: 2 General Motors 12-567 diesel engines, two shafts, twin rudders
- Speed: 12 knots (22 km/h; 14 mph)
- Boats & landing craft carried: Two or six LCVPs
- Troops: 14–16 officers, 131–147 enlisted men
- Complement: 7–9 officers, 104–120 enlisted men
- Armament: 2 × twin 40 mm gun mounts w/Mk.51 directors; 4 × single 40 mm gun mounts; 12 × single 20 mm gun mounts

USS Bradley County (LST-400) was an LST-1-class tank landing ship built for the United States Navy during World War II. Named for counties in Arkansas and Tennessee, she was the only U.S. Naval vessel to bear the name.

== Construction and career ==
LST-400 was laid down on 28 September 1942 at the Newport News Shipbuilding & Drydock Company; launched on 23 November 1942; sponsored by Miss Judith Flaxington; and commissioned on 7 January 1943.

=== Service in the United States Navy ===
During World War II, LST-400 was assigned to the European Theater and participated in the Sicilian occupation in July, 1943 and the Invasion of Normandy in June, 1944.

Following the War, LST-400 was redesignated USS Bradley County (LST-400) on 1 July 1955.

The ship was transferred to Taiwan as a grant in aid on 30 June 1955. She was struck from the Naval Vessel Register on 25 April 1960.

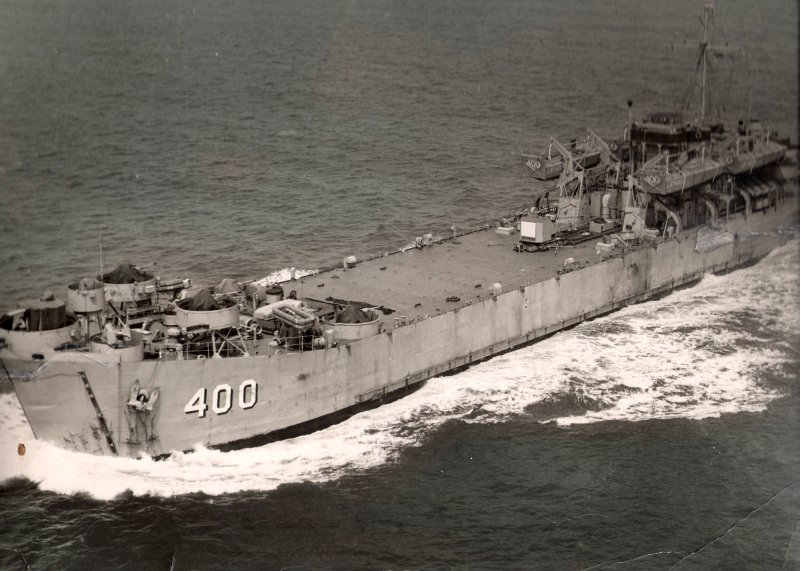
LST-400 underway, date and location unknown

=== Service in the Republic of China Navy ===
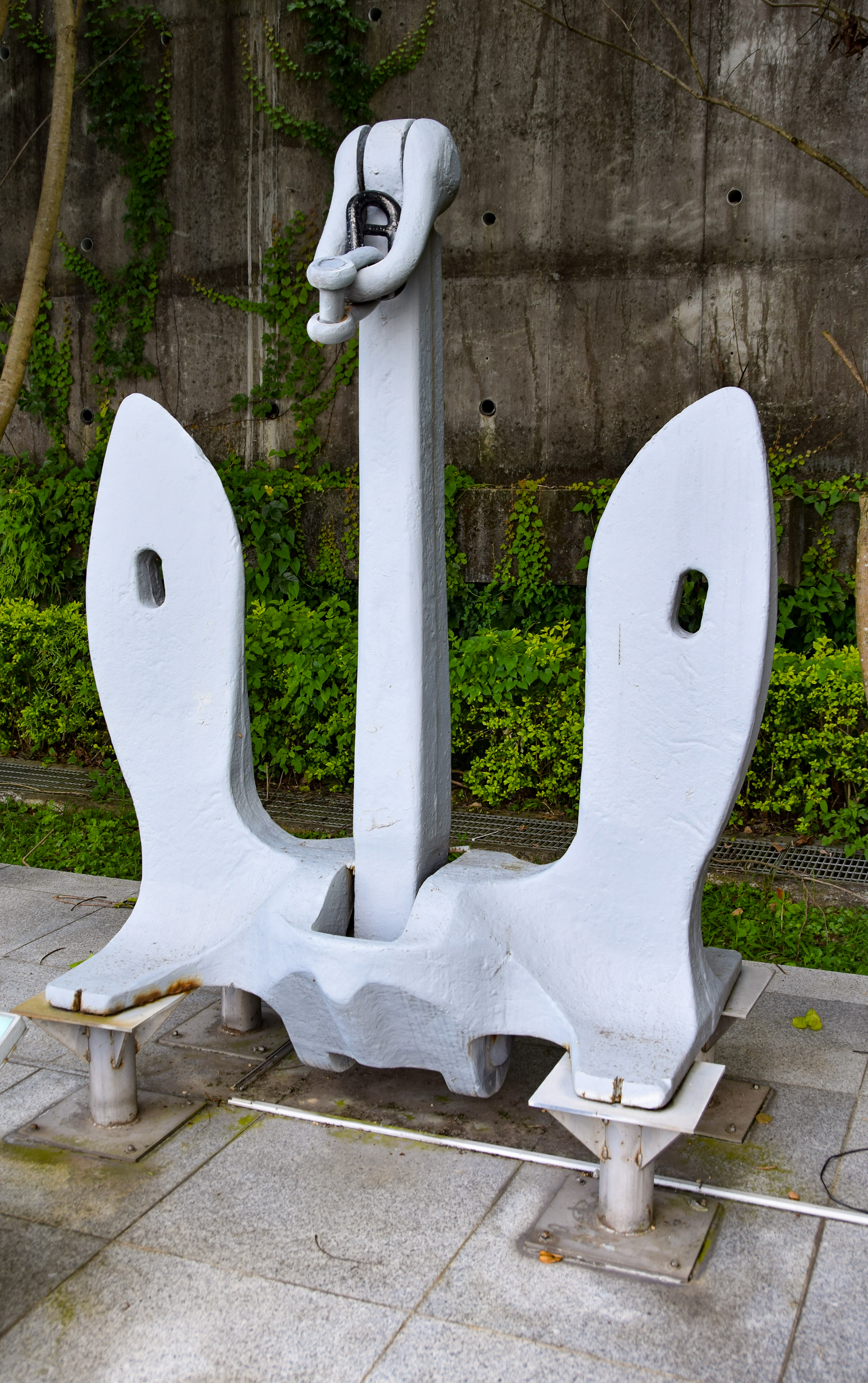
One of her anchors is on display at the New Taipei City Weapon Park

Based on the U.S. Defense Agreement, the U.S. presented it to Taiwan at the Port of San Diego. After receiving the ship, the ship was named ROCS Chung Suo (LST-217), and arrived in Taiwan on 29 December 1955.

The first captain was Li Bingcheng, who was mainly responsible for landing operations, transportation and replenishment of personnel and vehicles, and transportation and replenishment of outer islands.

During the period of service, the ship carried out transportation and replenishment missions such as the Lightning Plan and the Fortune Plan during the 823 Artillery Battle in 1958.

The ship was ordered to be decommissioned on 1 January 2011, due to the hull and most of her equipment being old.

On 16 July 2018, she was towed out to sea to be used as a target ship off Lanyu. She was struck by a missile and sank.

One of her anchors is on display at the New Taipei City Weapon Park (新北市武器公園).

== Awards ==
LST-400 earned two battle stars for World War II service.

== Citations ==
- "LST-400". Dictionary of American Naval Fighting Ships.
- "LST-400 Bradley County". NavSource.
