= USS Dunn County =

US naval vessel (1944–1961)

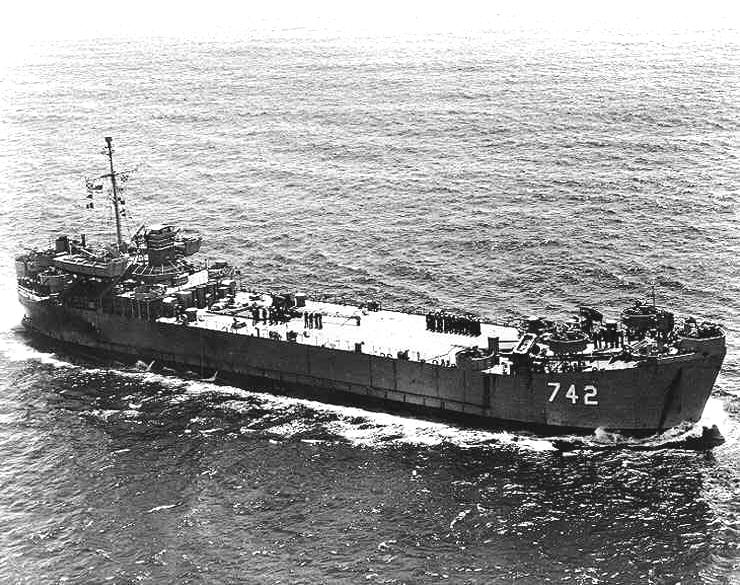
- USS Dunn County (LST-742) underway during the 1950s.

History

United States
- Name: USS LST-742
- Builder: Dravo Corporation, Neville Island, Pittsburgh
- Laid down: 12 March 1944
- Launched: 22 April 1944
- Commissioned: 23 May 1944
- Decommissioned: 26 April 1946
- Recommissioned: 1 September 1950
- Decommissioned: 1 February 1961
- Renamed: USS Dunn County (LST-742), 1 July 1955
- Stricken: 1 February 1961
- Honours and awards: 3 battle stars (World War II); 5 battle stars (Korea)
- Fate: Sold for scrapping, 6 September 1961

General characteristics
- Class & type: LST-542-class tank landing ship
- Displacement: 1,625 long tons (1,651 t) light; 3,640 long tons (3,698 t) full
- Length: 328 ft (100 m)
- Beam: 50 ft (15 m)
- Draft: 8 ft (2.4 m) forward; 14 ft 4 in (4.37 m) aft
- Propulsion: 2 × General Motors 12-567 diesel engines, two shafts
- Speed: 12 knots (22 km/h; 14 mph)
- Troops: Approximately 130 officers and enlisted men
- Complement: 8–10 officers, 89–100 enlisted men
- Armament: 1 × single 3"/50 caliber gun mount; 8 × 40 mm guns; 12 × 20 mm guns

USS Dunn County (LST-742) was an LST-542-class tank landing ship built for the United States Navy during World War II. Named after counties in North Dakota and Wisconsin, she was the only U.S. naval vessel to bear the name.

LST-742 was laid down on 12 March 1944 at Pittsburgh, Pennsylvania by the Dravo Corporation of Neville Island; launched on 22 April 1944; sponsored by Mrs. Harry Lester; and commissioned on 23 May 1944.

== Service history ==
During World War II, LST-742 was assigned to the Asiatic-Pacific theater and participated in the following operations: the Lingayen Gulf landing (January 1945), Visayan Island landings (March - April 1945) and the Tarakan Island operation (April - May 1945).

Following the war, LST-742 was decommissioned on 26 April 1946 and transferred to the United States Army on 28 June 1946 to serve as USAT LST-742. She was returned to the United States Navy and recommissioned on 1 September 1950. On 1 July 1955, she was redesignated USS Dunn County (LST-742). The ship performed service during the Korean War followed by extensive service with Amphibious Force, U.S. Pacific Fleet, until decommissioned and struck from the Naval Vessel Register on 1 February 1961. Dunn County was sold to Zidell Explorations, Inc. of Portland, Oregon on 6 September 1961 for scrapping.

LST-742 earned three battle stars for World War II service and five battle stars for the Korean War.

== See also ==
- Dunn County, North Dakota
- Dunn County, Wisconsin

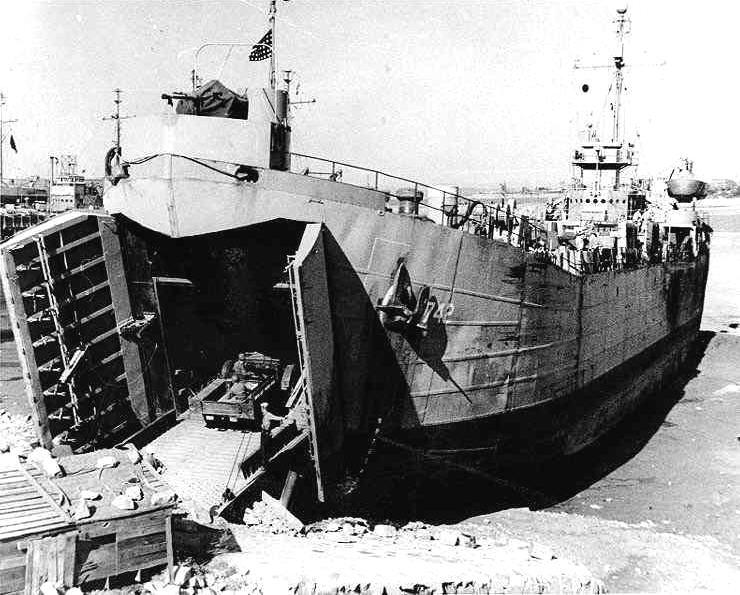
LST-742 on 13 October 1950 at Wolmi-do island, Inchon Harbor, loading supplies for the upcoming Wonsan invasion. Note that the ship is "high-and-dry" at low tide.
