= Lewis County =

Lewis County is the name of seven counties in the United States:

- Lewis County, Idaho
- Lewis County, Kentucky
- Lewis County, Missouri
- Lewis County, New York
- Lewis County, Tennessee
- Lewis County, Washington
- Lewis County, West Virginia

== See also ==
- Lewis and Clark County, Montana
- St. Louis County (disambiguation)
