= Morton County =

Morton County is the name of two counties in the United States:

- Morton County, Kansas
- Morton County, North Dakota
