= St. Joseph County =

St. Joseph County is the name of two counties in the United States:

- St. Joseph County, Indiana
- St. Joseph County, Michigan
