= Sheridan County =

Sheridan County is the name of five counties in the United States, each named for Philip Sheridan, a general in the American Civil War and the Indian Wars:

- Sheridan County, Kansas
- Sheridan County, Montana
- Sheridan County, Nebraska
- Sheridan County, North Dakota
- Sheridan County, Wyoming
