= Osage County =

Osage County is the name of several counties in the United States:

- Osage County, Kansas
- Osage County, Missouri
- Osage County, Oklahoma

It could also refer to

- August: Osage County, a play by Tracy Letts, set in the Oklahoma county
  - August: Osage County (film), the film adaptation of the play
