= Wells County =

Wells County is the name of two counties in the United States:

- Wells County, Indiana
- Wells County, North Dakota
