= Harding County =

Harding County is the name of two counties in the United States:

- Harding County, New Mexico
- Harding County, South Dakota
