= Prairie County =

Prairie County is the name of two counties in the United States:

- Prairie County, Arkansas
- Prairie County, Montana
