= Ashland County =

Ashland County is the name of two counties in the United States:

- Ashland County, Ohio
- Ashland County, Wisconsin

== See also ==
- Ashland (disambiguation)
