= Texas County =

Texas County is the name of two counties in the United States:

- Texas County, Missouri
- Texas County, Oklahoma

== See also ==
- List of counties in Texas
