= Moore County =

Moore County is the name of several counties in the United States:

- Moore County, North Carolina
- Moore County, Tennessee
- Moore County, Texas
