= Worcester County =

Worcester County is the name of two counties in the United States of America:

- Worcester County, Massachusetts
- Worcester County, Maryland

== See also ==
- Worcestershire, England
