= Roberts County =

Roberts County is the name of two counties in the United States:

- Roberts County, South Dakota
- Roberts County, Texas
