= Rockingham County =

Rockingham County is the name of three counties in the United States of America:

- Rockingham County, New Hampshire
- Rockingham County, North Carolina
- Rockingham County, Virginia
