= Dawson County =

Dawson County is the name of several counties in the United States:

- Dawson County, Georgia
- Dawson County, Montana
- Dawson County, Nebraska
- Dawson County, Texas
