= Westmoreland County =

Westmoreland County may refer to:

== Australia ==
- Westmoreland County, New South Wales
- the former name of Westmoreland Land District, Tasmania

== Canada ==
- Westmorland County, New Brunswick

== United Kingdom ==
- The county of Westmorland, archaically spelt Westmoreland

== United States ==
- Westmoreland County, Pennsylvania
- Westmoreland County, Virginia
- Westmoreland County, Connecticut - A former county in Connecticut located in present-day Wyoming Valley

== See also ==
- Westmoreland Parish, Jamaica
