= Todd County =

Todd County is the name of three counties in the United States:

- Todd County, Kentucky
- Todd County, Minnesota
- Todd County, South Dakota
