= Baker County =

Baker County is the name of three counties in the United States:

- Baker County, Florida
- Baker County, Georgia
- Baker County, Oregon
