= Fillmore County =

Fillmore County can refer to two real, and one fictional county in the US

- Fillmore County, Minnesota
- Fillmore County, Nebraska
- The fictional Fillmore County, Kansas
