= Haskell County =

Haskell County is the name of several counties in the United States:

- Haskell County, Kansas
- Haskell County, Oklahoma
- Haskell County, Texas
