= Wilkes County =

Wilkes County is the name of two counties in the United States:

- Wilkes County, Georgia
- Wilkes County, North Carolina
