= Clearwater County =

Clearwater County may refer to:

- Clearwater County, Alberta, Canada
- Clearwater County, Idaho, United States
- Clearwater County, Minnesota, United States
- USS Clearwater County (LST-602), a United States Navy tank landing ship
