= Chase County =

Chase County is the name of two counties in the United States:

- Chase County, Kansas
- Chase County, Nebraska
