= Hampshire County =

Hampshire County is the name of two counties in the United States:

- Hampshire County, Massachusetts
- Hampshire County, West Virginia

== See also ==
- Hampshire, a county in England
- Hampshire County Lunatic Asylum
