= Wilson County =

Wilson County is the name of four counties in the United States:

- Wilson County, Kansas
- Wilson County, North Carolina
- Wilson County, Tennessee
- Wilson County, Texas
