= Steuben County =

Steuben County is the name of two counties in the United States of America:

- Steuben County, Indiana
- Steuben County, New York
