= Pottawatomie County =

Pottawatomie County is the name of several counties in the United States:

- Pottawattamie County, Iowa
- Pottawatomie County, Kansas
- Pottawatomie County, Oklahoma
