= Ford County =

Ford County may refer to:

- Ford County, Illinois, a county located in the U.S. state of Illinois
- Ford County, Kansas, a county located in southwest Kansas
- Ford County (short story collection), a collection of novellas by John Grisham set in the fictional Ford County, Mississippi
