= Whitley County =

Whitley County is the name of two counties in the United States:

- Whitley County, Indiana
- Whitley County, Kentucky
