= Valley County =

Valley County is the name of several counties in the United States:

- Valley County, Idaho
- Valley County, Montana
- Valley County, Nebraska
