= Saline County =

Saline County is the name of several counties in the United States:

- Saline County, Arkansas
- Saline County, Illinois
- Saline County, Kansas
- Saline County, Missouri
- Saline County, Nebraska
