= Liberty County =

Liberty County is the name of four counties in the United States:

- Liberty County, Florida
- Liberty County, Georgia
- Liberty County, Montana
- Liberty County, Texas

== See also ==
- Liberty County High School (Florida)
- Liberty County High School (Georgia)
