= Turner County =

Turner County is the name of two counties in the United States:

- Turner County, Georgia
- Turner County, South Dakota
