= Robertson County =

Robertson County is the name of three counties in the United States:

- Robertson County, Kentucky
- Robertson County, Tennessee
- Robertson County, Texas
