= Bell County =

Bell County is the name of two counties in the United States:

- Bell County, Kentucky
- Bell County, Texas
