= Kiowa County =

Kiowa County is the name of several counties in the United States:

- Kiowa County, Colorado
- Kiowa County, Kansas
- Kiowa County, Oklahoma
