= Pendleton County =

Pendleton County is the name of two counties in the United States:

- Pendleton County, Kentucky
- Pendleton County, West Virginia
