= Rush County =

Rush County is the name of two counties in the United States:

- Rush County, Indiana
- Rush County, Kansas
