= Steele County =

Steele County is the name of two counties in the United States:

- Steele County, Minnesota
- Steele County, North Dakota
