= Tazewell County =

Tazewell County is the name of two counties in the United States:

- Tazewell County, Illinois
- Tazewell County, Virginia
