= Iowa County =

Iowa County is the name of two counties in the United States:

- Iowa County, Iowa
- Iowa County, Wisconsin
