= Livingston County =

Livingston County is the name of several counties in the United States:

- Livingston County, Illinois
- Livingston County, Kentucky
- Livingston County, Michigan
- Livingston County, Missouri
- Livingston County, New York
- Livingston Parish, Louisiana
