= Comanche County =

Comanche County is the name of three counties in the United States:

- Comanche County, Kansas
- Comanche County, Oklahoma
- Comanche County, Texas
