= Choctaw County =

Choctaw County is the name of several counties in the United States:

- Choctaw County, Alabama
- Choctaw County, Mississippi
- Choctaw County, Oklahoma

It is also the name of a Spearhead-class United States Navy ship.
