= Seneca County =

Seneca County is the name of two counties in the United States:

- Seneca County, New York
- Seneca County, Ohio
