= Bourbon County =

Bourbon County is the name of two counties and one former county in the United States:

- Bourbon County, Georgia (1785-1788)
- Bourbon County, Kansas
- Bourbon County, Kentucky, originally Bourbon County, Virginia (1785–1792)
