= Greeley County =

Greeley County may refer to:

- Greeley County, Kansas
- Greeley County, Nebraska

== See also ==
- Greenlee County, Arizona
