= Mississippi County =

Mississippi County is the name of two counties in the United States:

- Mississippi County, Arkansas
- Mississippi County, Missouri
