= Baldwin County =

Baldwin County may refer to:

- Baldwin County, Alabama
- Baldwin County, Georgia
