= Thomas County =

Thomas County is the name of several counties in the United States:

- Thomas County, Georgia
- Thomas County, Kansas
- Thomas County, Nebraska
