= Emmet County =

Emmet County is the name of two counties in the United States:

- Emmet County, Iowa
- Emmet County, Michigan
