= Perkins County =

Perkins County is the name of two counties in the United States:

- Perkins County, Nebraska
- Perkins County, South Dakota
