= Cameron County =

Cameron County is the name of several counties in the United States:

- Cameron County, Pennsylvania
- Cameron County, Texas

== See also ==
- Cameron Parish, Louisiana
