= Pawnee County =

Pawnee County is the name of several counties in the United States:

- Pawnee County, Kansas
- Pawnee County, Nebraska
- Pawnee County, Oklahoma
