= Middlesex County =

Middlesex County may refer to:

== Canada ==
- Middlesex County, Ontario

== Jamaica ==
- Middlesex County, Jamaica

== United Kingdom ==
- Middlesex, a historic county in England

== United States ==
- Middlesex County, Connecticut
- Middlesex County, Massachusetts, the most populous Middlesex County in the United States
- Middlesex County, New Jersey
- Middlesex County, Virginia

== See also ==
- Middlesex (disambiguation)
