= Bedford County =

Bedford County is the name of several counties in the United States:

- Bedford County, Pennsylvania
- Bedford County, Tennessee
- Bedford County, Virginia

Bedford County may also refer to:

- Bedford County, Lower Canada, a historical county that preceded Missisquoi County, Quebec
- Bedfordshire, an English county
