= Summit County =

Summit County is the name of three counties in the United States:

- Summit County, Colorado
- Summit County, Ohio
- Summit County, Utah
