= Van Buren County =

Van Buren County is the name of four present counties in the United States, all of which are named for Martin Van Buren.

- Van Buren County, Arkansas
- Van Buren County, Iowa
- Van Buren County, Michigan
- Van Buren County, Tennessee
- Cass County, Missouri, formerly called Van Buren County
