= Sioux County =

Sioux County is the name of three counties in the United States:

- Sioux County, Iowa
- Sioux County, Nebraska
- Sioux County, North Dakota
