= Stafford County =

Stafford County is the name of:

== Places ==
- Stafford County, Kansas, United States
  - Stafford County Courthouse (Kansas)
- Stafford County, Virginia, United States
  - Stafford County Public Schools

== Sports ==
- Stafford County F.C., English football team

== See also ==
- Staffordshire, England
