= Kendall County =

Kendall County is the name of two counties in the United States:

- Kendall County, Illinois
- Kendall County, Texas
