= Morrow County =

Morrow County is the name of two counties in the United States:

- Morrow County, Ohio
- Morrow County, Oregon
