= Dakota County =

Dakota County may refer to:

- Dakota County, Minnesota in the Twin Cities Metropolitan Area of east-central Minnesota
- Dakota County, Nebraska in northeastern Nebraska
