= Rusk County =

Rusk County is or was the name of several counties in the United States:

- Rusk County, South Dakota, a former county; see Armstrong County, South Dakota
- Rusk County, Texas
- Rusk County, Wisconsin
