= Grady County =

Grady County is the name of two counties in the United States:

- Grady County, Georgia
- Grady County, Oklahoma
