= Seminole County =

Seminole County is the name of several counties in the United States:

- Seminole County, Florida
- Seminole County, Georgia
- Seminole County, Oklahoma
