= Hutchinson County =

Hutchinson County is the name of two counties in the United States:

- Hutchinson County, South Dakota
- Hutchinson County, Texas
