= Richland County =

Richland County is the name of six counties in the United States:

- Richland County, Illinois
- Richland County, Montana
- Richland County, North Dakota
- Richland County, Ohio
- Richland County, South Carolina
- Richland County, Wisconsin

== See also ==
- Richland Parish, Louisiana
