= Holt County =

Holt County may refer to:

- Holt County, Missouri
- Holt County, Nebraska
