= Page County =

Page County is the name of two counties in the United States:

- Page County, Iowa
- Page County, Virginia

== See also ==
- Puge County, a county in Sichuan Province, China
