= Humboldt County =

Humboldt County may refer to:

== Places in the United States ==
- Humboldt County, California
- Humboldt County, Iowa
- Humboldt County, Nevada

== Arts, entertainment, and media ==
- Humboldt County (film), a 2008 film about the marijuana cultivation culture in Humboldt County, California
- Humboldt County High, a 2001 album by American hip hop group Potluck

== See also ==
- Humboldt (disambiguation)
