= Somerset County =

Somerset County may refer to:

== Australia ==
- the former name of Somerset Land District, Tasmania
- Somerset Region in Queensland

== United Kingdom ==
- Somerset, England

== United States ==
- Somerset County, Maine
- Somerset County, Maryland
- Somerset County, New Jersey, the most populous county in the United States named Somerset
- Somerset County, Pennsylvania
