= Stewart County =

Stewart County is the name of two counties in the United States of America:

- Stewart County, Georgia
- Stewart County, Tennessee
