= McLean County =

McLean County is the name of three counties in the United States:

- McLean County, Illinois
- McLean County, Kentucky
- McLean County, North Dakota
