= Otero County =

Otero County is the name of two counties in the United States:

- Otero County, Colorado
- Otero County, New Mexico
