= Hardin County =

Hardin County is the name of six counties in the United States of America:

- Hardin County, Illinois
- Hardin County, Iowa
- Hardin County, Kentucky
- Hardin County, Ohio
- Hardin County, Tennessee
- Hardin County, Texas

== See also ==
- Harden County, New South Wales, Australia
