= Martin County =

Martin County is the name of six counties in the United States:

- Martin County, Florida
- Martin County, Indiana
- Martin County, Kentucky
- Martin County, Minnesota
- Martin County, North Carolina
- Martin County, Texas
