= Walworth County =

Walworth County may refer to:

== Places ==
- The name of two counties in the United States:
  - Walworth County, South Dakota
  - Walworth County, Wisconsin

== Ships ==
- USS Walworth County (LST-1164), a United States Navy tank landing ship in commission from 1953 to 1971, which then saw non-commissioned Military Sealift Command service as USNS Walworth County (T-LST-1164) from 1972 to 1973
