= Platte County =

Platte County is the name of three counties in the United States:

- Platte County, Missouri
- Platte County, Nebraska
- Platte County, Wyoming
- Platte County, Colorado Territory, an unorganized county of the Territory of Colorado from 1872 to 1874
