= Noble County =

Noble County is the name of several counties in the United States:

- Noble County, Indiana
- Noble County, Ohio
- Noble County, Oklahoma

== See also ==
- Nobles County, Minnesota
