= Smith County =

Smith County is the name of four counties in the United States:

- Smith County, Kansas
- Smith County, Mississippi
- Smith County, Tennessee
- Smith County, Texas

== See also ==
- Smyth County, Virginia
