= Rutherford County =

Rutherford County is the name of two counties in the United States:

- Rutherford County, North Carolina
- Rutherford County, Tennessee
