= Williams County =

Williams County is the name of some counties in the United States of America

- Williams County, North Dakota
- Williams County, Ohio
