= Gloucester County =

Gloucester County may refer to:

== Australia ==
- Gloucester County, New South Wales

== Canada ==
- Gloucester County, New Brunswick

== United Kingdom ==
- Gloucestershire, the English county after which the others are named

== United States ==
- Gloucester County, New Jersey
- Gloucester County, Virginia
