= Northampton County =

Northampton County is the name of several counties in the United States:

- Northampton County, North Carolina
- Northampton County, Pennsylvania
- Northampton County, Virginia

== See also ==
- Northamptonshire, England, historically and formally sometimes called the County of Northampton
