= Richmond County =

Richmond County may refer to places:

== Australia ==
- Richmond County, New South Wales, a cadastral division

== Canada ==
- Richmond County, Nova Scotia

== United Kingdom ==
- Richmondshire, the original Richmond County in Yorkshire, England

== United States ==
- Richmond County, Georgia
- Richmond County, New York, the Staten Island borough of New York City
- Richmond County, North Carolina
- Richmond County, Virginia
