= Meigs County =

Meigs County is the name of two counties in the United States:

- Meigs County, Ohio
- Meigs County, Tennessee
