= Crittenden County =

Crittenden County may mean:

In the United States:

- Crittenden County, Arkansas
- Crittenden County, Kentucky
