= Thurston County =

Thurston County is the name of two counties in the United States:

- Thurston County, Nebraska
- Thurston County, Washington
