= White County =

White County may refer to:

- White County, New South Wales, Australia
- White County, Arkansas, United States
- White County, Georgia, United States
- White County, Illinois, United States
- White County, Indiana, United States
- White County, Tennessee, United States
