= Florence County =

Florence County is the name of two counties in the United States:

- Florence County, South Carolina
- Florence County, Wisconsin
