= Sullivan County =

Sullivan County is the name of six counties in the United States of America:

- Sullivan County, Indiana
- Sullivan County, Missouri
- Sullivan County, New Hampshire
- Sullivan County, New York
- Sullivan County, Pennsylvania
- Sullivan County, Tennessee
