= Hopkins County =

Hopkins County is the name of two counties in the United States:

- Hopkins County, Kentucky
- Hopkins County, Texas
