= Chambers County =

Chambers County is the name of two counties in the United States:

- Chambers County, Alabama
- Chambers County, Texas
