= Randolph County =

Randolph County is the name of eight counties in the United States:

- Randolph County, Alabama
- Randolph County, Arkansas
- Randolph County, Georgia
- Randolph County, Illinois
- Randolph County, Indiana
- Randolph County, Missouri
- Randolph County, North Carolina
- Randolph County, West Virginia
