= Lowndes County =

Lowndes County is the name of three counties in the United States:

- Lowndes County, Alabama
- Lowndes County, Georgia
- Lowndes County, Mississippi

All three are named for U.S. Congress member William J. Lowndes.
