= Medina County =

Medina County is the name of two counties in the United States:

- Medina County, Ohio
- Medina County, Texas
