= Leon County =

Leon County is the name of two counties in the United States:

- Leon County, Florida
- Leon County, Texas

== See also ==
- Viscounty of Léon in Brittany in northwestern France
