= Edwards County =

Edwards County is the name of several counties in the United States:

- Edwards County, Illinois
- Edwards County, Kansas
- Edwards County, Texas
