= Windham County =

Windham County may refer to:

Places

- Two counties in the United States:
  - Windham County, Connecticut
  - Windham County, Vermont

Ships

- USS LST-1170, a United States Navy landing ship tank commissioned in 1954 and renamed USS Windham County (LST-1170) in 1955
