= Ramsey County =

There are two places in the United States named Ramsey County:

- Ramsey County, Minnesota, the seat of the state capital, Saint Paul
- Ramsey County, North Dakota
