= Miami County =

Miami County is the name of four counties in the United States:

- Miami-Dade County, Florida
- Miami County, Indiana
- Miami County, Kansas
- Miami County, Ohio
