= Bay County =

Bay County is the name of three counties:

- Bay County, Florida, United States
- Bay County, Michigan, United States
- Baicheng County, also known as Bay County (pronounced like 'bye'), Aksu Prefecture, Xinjiang, China
