= Jeff Davis County =

Jeff Davis County is the name of two counties in the United States:

- Jeff Davis County, Georgia
- Jeff Davis County, Texas

== See also ==
- Jefferson Davis County, Mississippi
- Jefferson Davis Parish, Louisiana
