= Terrell County =

Terrell County may refer to:

== Places ==
- Terrell County, Georgia
- Terrell County, Texas
- Terrell County Independent School District, a public school district based in Sanderson, Texas

== Ships ==
- USS Terrell County (LST-1157), a United States Navy tank landing ship in commission from 1952 to 1971
