= Scotland County =

Scotland County is the name of two counties in the United States:

- Scotland County, Missouri
- Scotland County, North Carolina
