= Menard County =

Menard County is the name of two counties in the United States:

- Menard County, Illinois
- Menard County, Texas
