= Mills County =

Mills County is the name of two counties in the United States:

- Mills County, Iowa
- Mills County, Texas

== See also ==
- Roger Mills County, Oklahoma
