= Ohio County =

Ohio County is the name of three counties in the United States:

- Ohio County, Indiana
- Ohio County, Kentucky
- Ohio County, West Virginia, formerly in Virginia

== See also ==
- Ohio Country
