= Sierra County =

Sierra County is the name of two counties in the United States:

- Sierra County, California
- Sierra County, New Mexico
