= Gilmer County =

Gilmer County is the name of two counties in the United States:

- Gilmer County, Georgia
- Gilmer County, West Virginia
