= Rice County =

Rice County may refer to:

- Rice County, Kansas, U.S.
- Rice County, Minnesota, U.S.
