= Santa Cruz County =

Santa Cruz County is the name of two counties in the United States:

- Santa Cruz County, Arizona
- Santa Cruz County, California
