= Harlan County =

Harlan County may refer to:

== Places in the United States ==
- Harlan County, Kentucky
- Harlan County, Nebraska

== Other ==
- Harlan County (album), a 1969 album by American singer-songwriter Jim Ford
- Harlan County, USA, a 1976 American documentary film
- USS Harlan County (LST-1196), a U.S. Navy tank landing ship
