= Talbot County =

Talbot County may refer to counties:

In the United States

- Talbot County, Georgia
- Talbot County, Maryland

Elsewhere

- Talbot County, Victoria, Australia
