= Sumter County =

Sumter County is the name of four counties in the United States:

- Sumter County, Alabama
- Sumter County, Florida
- Sumter County, Georgia
- Sumter County, South Carolina
