= Clayton County =

Clayton County is the name of three counties in the United States:

- Clay County, Arkansas, formerly known as Clayton County
- Clayton County, Georgia in the Atlanta Metropolitan Area
- Clayton County, Iowa
