= Holmes County =

Holmes County is the name of three counties in the United States:

- Holmes County, Florida
- Holmes County, Mississippi
- Holmes County, Ohio
