= Frederick County =

Frederick County is the name of two counties in the United States.

- Frederick County, Maryland
- Frederick County, Virginia
