= Meade County =

Meade County is the name of three counties in the United States:

- Meade County, Kansas
- Meade County, Kentucky
- Meade County, South Dakota
