= Bibb County =

Bibb County is the name of two counties in the United States:

- Bibb County, Alabama
- Bibb County, Georgia
