= Suffolk County =

Suffolk County may refer to:

- Suffolk County, Massachusetts, United States
- Suffolk County, New York, United States
- Suffolk, a county of England

== See also ==
- Suffolk County Community College, New York
- Suffolk, Virginia, an independent city and county equivalent
