= McPherson County =

McPherson County is the name of three counties in the United States:

- McPherson County, Kansas
- McPherson County, Nebraska
- McPherson County, South Dakota
