= Trinity County =

Trinity County is the name of two counties in the United States:

- Trinity County, California
- Trinity County, Texas
