= Big Horn County =

Big Horn County is the name of two counties in the United States:

- Big Horn County, Montana
- Big Horn County, Wyoming
