= McIntosh County =

McIntosh County is the name of several counties in the United States:

- McIntosh County, Georgia
- McIntosh County, North Dakota
- McIntosh County, Oklahoma
