= Roosevelt County =

Roosevelt County refers to the following counties in the United States:

- Roosevelt County, Montana
- Roosevelt County, New Mexico
