= Chesterfield County =

Chesterfield County may refer to:

Places

- Two counties in the United States:
  - Chesterfield County, South Carolina
  - Chesterfield County, Virginia

Ships

- USS Chesterfield County (LST-551), a United States Navy tank landing ship in commission from 1944 to 1955 as USS LST-551 and in the late 1960s as USS Chesterfield County
