= Ward County =

Ward County may refer to:

- Ward County, North Dakota
- Ward County, Texas
- Ward County, Queensland
