= Barry County =

Barry County is the name of two counties in the United States, both named for U.S. Postmaster General William T. Barry:

- Barry County, Michigan
- Barry County, Missouri
