= Chautauqua County =

Chautauqua County is the name of two counties in the United States:

- Chautauqua County, Kansas
- Chautauqua County, New York
