= Fannin County =

Fannin County is the name of two counties in the United States:

- Fannin County, Georgia
- Fannin County, Texas
