= Chippewa County =

Chippewa County is the name of several counties in the United States:

- Chippewa County, Michigan
- Chippewa County, Minnesota
- Chippewa County, Wisconsin
