= Spencer County =

Spencer County is the name of two counties in the United States:

- Spencer County, Indiana
- Spencer County, Kentucky
