= Wright County =

Wright County is the name of three counties in the United States:

- Wright County, Iowa
- Wright County, Minnesota
- Wright County, Missouri

It is also the name of one company:

- Wright County Egg, based in Galt, Iowa

It is also a historic county in Canada:

- Wright County, Quebec
