= Christian County =

Christian County is the name of several counties in the United States:

- Christian County, Illinois
- Christian County, Kentucky
- Christian County, Missouri
