= Miller County =

Miller County may refer to several counties in the United States:

- Miller County, Arkansas
- Miller County, Arkansas Territory, former county (1820–1838) of the former Arkansas Territory, now split between several states (Arkansas, southeastern Oklahoma and northeastern Texas)
- Miller County, Georgia
- Miller County, Missouri
