= Renville County =

Renville County may be:

- Renville County, Minnesota
- Renville County, North Dakota
