= Haywood County =

Haywood County is the name of two counties in the United States:

- Haywood County, North Carolina
- Haywood County, Tennessee
