= Wood County =

Wood County is the name of four counties in the United States:

- Wood County, Ohio
- Wood County, Texas
- Wood County, West Virginia
- Wood County, Wisconsin
