= Escambia County =

Escambia County is the name of two counties in the United States of America:

- Escambia County, Alabama
- Escambia County, Florida
