= Golden Valley County =

Golden Valley County is the name of two counties in the United States:

- Golden Valley County, Montana
- Golden Valley County, North Dakota
