= Mineral County =

Mineral County is the name of four counties in the United States:

- Mineral County, Colorado
- Mineral County, Montana
- Mineral County, Nevada
- Mineral County, West Virginia
