= Wichita County =

Wichita County is the name of the following counties in the United States:

- Wichita County, Kansas
- Wichita County, Texas
