= Owen County =

Owen County is the name of two counties in the United States:

- Owen County, Indiana
- Owen County, Kentucky
