= Nemaha County =

Nemaha County is the name of two counties in the United States:

- Nemaha County, Kansas
- Nemaha County, Nebraska
