= Winston County =

Winston County is the name of two counties in the United States:

- Winston County, Alabama
- Winston County, Mississippi
