= Wilcox County =

Wilcox County is the name of two counties in the United States:

- Wilcox County, Alabama
- Wilcox County, Georgia
