= Plymouth County =

Plymouth County is the name of two counties in the United States:

- Plymouth County, Iowa
- Plymouth County, Massachusetts
