= Dickinson County =

Dickinson County is the name of three counties in the United States:

- Dickinson County, Iowa
- Dickinson County, Kansas
- Dickinson County, Michigan

== See also ==
- Dickenson County, Virginia
