= Caroline County =

Caroline County is the name of two counties in the United States:

- Caroline County, Maryland
- Caroline County, Virginia
