= Wilkinson County =

Wilkinson County is the name of two counties in the United States:

- Wilkinson County, Georgia
- Wilkinson County, Mississippi
