= Pope County =

Pope County is the name of three counties in the United States:

- Pope County, Arkansas
- Pope County, Illinois
- Pope County, Minnesota
