= Oldham County =

Oldham County is the name of two counties in the United States:

- Oldham County, Kentucky
- Oldham County, Texas
