= Champaign County =

Champaign County is the name of two counties in the United States:

- Champaign County, Illinois
- Champaign County, Ohio
