= Sedgwick County =

Sedgwick County is the name of two counties in the United States:

- Sedgwick County, Colorado
- Sedgwick County, Kansas
