= Crockett County =

Crockett County is the name of two counties in the United States, both named for frontiersman and politician Davy Crockett:

- Crockett County, Tennessee
- Crockett County, Texas
