= Wyoming County =

Wyoming County may refer to one of several counties in the United States:

- Wyoming County, New York
- Wyoming County, Pennsylvania
- Wyoming County, West Virginia

== See also ==
- List of counties in Wyoming
