= Murray County =

Murray County may refer to:

In Australia:

- Murray County, New South Wales
- Murray County, Western Australia

In the United States:

- Murray County, Georgia
- Murray County, Minnesota
- Murray County, Oklahoma
