= Bradford County =

Bradford County is the name of two counties in the United States:

- Bradford County, Florida
- Bradford County, Pennsylvania
