= Hillsborough County =

Hillsborough County is the name of two counties in the United States:

- Hillsborough County, Florida
- Hillsborough County, New Hampshire
