= Tyler County =

Tyler County is the name of two counties in the United States:

- Tyler County, Texas
- Tyler County, West Virginia
