= Ripley County =

Ripley County is the name of two counties in the United States:

- Ripley County, Indiana
- Ripley County, Missouri
