= Essex County =

Essex County may refer to:

== Canada ==
- Essex County, Ontario

== United Kingdom ==
- Essex, the original county in England

== United States of America ==
- Essex County, Massachusetts
- Essex County, New Jersey, the most populous Essex County in the country
- Essex County, New York
- Essex County, Vermont
- Essex County, Virginia

== Other uses ==
- Essex County Trilogy, a trilogy of graphic novels by Jeff Lemire
- Essex County (TV series), a television drama series adapted from the graphic novel
