= Lucas County =

Lucas County is the name of two counties in the United States:

- Lucas County, Iowa
- Lucas County, Ohio
