= Dallas County =

Dallas County may refer to:

Places in the USA:

- Dallas County, Alabama, founded in 1818, the first county in the United States by that name
- Dallas County, Arkansas
- Dallas County, Iowa
- Dallas County, Missouri
- Dallas County, Texas, the ninth most populous county in the United States

Other uses:

- Dallas County Community College District, in Texas
