= Worth County =

Worth County is the name of three counties in the United States:

- Worth County, Georgia
- Worth County, Iowa
- Worth County, Missouri
