= Bryan County =

Bryan County is the name of two counties in the United States:

- Bryan County, Georgia
- Bryan County, Oklahoma
