= Iron County =

Iron County is the name of four counties in the United States:

- Iron County, Michigan
- Iron County, Missouri
- Iron County, Utah
- Iron County, Wisconsin
