= Tioga County =

Tioga County may refer to:

== Places ==
- Two counties in the United States:
  - Tioga County, New York
  - Tioga County, Pennsylvania

== Other ==
- USS Tioga County (LST-1158), a United States Navy landing ship tank in commission from 1953 to 1970 which also saw non-commissioned service in the Military Sealift Command from 1972 to 1973 as USNS Tioga County (T-LST-1158)
