= Dorchester County =

Dorchester County is the name of two counties in the United States:

- Dorchester County, Maryland
- Dorchester County, South Carolina
