= Laurens County =

Laurens County is the name of two counties in the United States:

- Laurens County, Georgia
- Laurens County, South Carolina
