= Lauderdale County =

Lauderdale County is the name of several counties in the United States:

- Lauderdale County, Alabama
- Lauderdale County, Mississippi
- Lauderdale County, Tennessee
