= Tipton County =

Tipton County is the name of two counties in the United States:

- Tipton County, Indiana
- Tipton County, Tennessee
