= Effingham County =

Effingham County is the name of two counties in the United States:

- Effingham County, Georgia
- Effingham County, Illinois
