= Gallatin County =

Gallatin County is the name of three counties in the United States, all named directly or indirectly for Albert Gallatin:

- Gallatin County, Illinois
- Gallatin County, Kentucky
- Gallatin County, Montana
