= Fairfield County =

Fairfield County is the name of three counties in the United States:

- Fairfield County, Connecticut
- Fairfield County, Ohio
- Fairfield County, South Carolina
