= Mason County =

Mason County is the name of several counties in the United States:

- Mason County, Illinois
- Mason County, Kentucky, originally Mason County, Virginia (1788–1792)
- Mason County, Michigan
- Mason County, Texas
- Mason County, Washington
- Mason County, West Virginia, originally Mason County, Virginia (1804–1863)
