= Roane County =

Roane County may refer to two counties in the United States:

- Roane County, Tennessee
- Roane County, West Virginia

== Fiction ==
- Roane County, Indiana, setting of American science fiction horror drama television series Stranger Things

== See also ==
- Roanoke County
