= Giles County =

Giles County is the name of two counties in the United States:

- Giles County, Tennessee
- Giles County, Virginia
