= Oconee County =

Oconee County is the name of two counties in the United States:

- Oconee County, Georgia
- Oconee County, South Carolina
