= Phelps County =

Phelps County is the name of two counties in the United States:

- Phelps County, Missouri
- Phelps County, Nebraska
