= Seward County =

Seward County is the name of two counties in the United States:

- Seward County, Kansas
- Seward County, Nebraska
