= McDowell County =

McDowell County is the name of two counties in the United States:

- McDowell County, North Carolina
- McDowell County, West Virginia
