= Yuma County =

Yuma County is the name of two counties in the United States:

- Yuma County, Arizona
- Yuma County, Colorado
