= Ottawa County =

Ottawa County is the name of four counties in the United States:

- Ottawa County, Kansas
- Ottawa County, Michigan
- Ottawa County, Ohio
- Ottawa County, Oklahoma

== See also ==
- County of Ottawa, a historical electoral district in Quebec, Canada
