= Atchison County =

Atchison County is the name of two counties in the United States, both named for Missouri Senator David Rice Atchison:

- Atchison County, Kansas
- Atchison County, Missouri
