= Otsego County =

Otsego County is the name of two counties in the United States:

- Otsego County, Michigan
- Otsego County, New York
