= Halifax County =

Halifax County is the name of three counties:

- In Canada:
  - Halifax County, Nova Scotia
- In the United States:
  - Halifax County, North Carolina
  - Halifax County, Virginia
