= Stone County =

Stone County is the name of several counties in the United States:

- Stone County, Arkansas
- Stone County, Mississippi
- Stone County, Missouri
