= Wise County =

Wise County is the name of two counties in the United States:

- Wise County, Texas
- Wise County, Virginia
