= Lane County =

Lane County is the name of two counties in the United States:

- Lane County, Kansas
- Lane County, Oregon
