= Nicholas County =

Nicholas County is the name of two counties in the United States:

- Nicholas County, Kentucky
- Nicholas County, West Virginia
