= Park County =

Park County is the name of three counties in the United States:

- Park County, Colorado
  - Park County, Jefferson Territory
- Park County, Montana
- Park County, Wyoming
