= Cleveland County =

Cleveland County may refer to:

- Cleveland County, Arkansas, named for Grover Cleveland, president of the United States
- Cleveland County, North Carolina, named for Benjamin Cleveland, a colonel in the American Revolutionary War
- Cleveland County, Oklahoma, named for Grover Cleveland
- Cleveland (county), a former county in England, now Tees Valley

== See also ==
- Cuyahoga County, Ohio, containing the city of Cleveland
