= Pontotoc County =

Pontotoc County is the name of two counties in the United States:

- Pontotoc County, Mississippi
- Pontotoc County, Oklahoma
