= Mecklenburg County =

Mecklenburg County is the name of two counties in the United States:

- Mecklenburg County, North Carolina
- Mecklenburg County, Virginia

== See also ==
- Muhlenberg County, Kentucky
