= Colfax County =

Colfax County is the name of two counties in the United States:

- Colfax County, Nebraska
- Colfax County, New Mexico
