= Lancaster County =

Lancaster County may refer to:

- Lancaster County, Nebraska, United States
- Lancaster County, Pennsylvania, United States
- Lancaster County, South Carolina, United States
- Lancaster County, Virginia, United States

== See also ==
- County of Lancaster, England, now Lancashire
