= Paulding County =

Paulding County is the name of two counties in the United States of America:

- Paulding County, Georgia
- Paulding County, Ohio
