= Panola County =

Panola County is the name of two counties in the United States:

- Panola County, Mississippi
- Panola County, Texas
