= Kane County =

Kane County is the name of two counties in the United States:

- Kane County, Illinois
- Kane County, Utah
