= Potter County =

Potter County is the name of several counties in the United States:

- Potter County, Pennsylvania
- Potter County, South Dakota
- Potter County, Texas
