= Teton County =

Teton County is the name of several counties in the United States:

- Teton County, Idaho
- Teton County, Montana
- Teton County, Wyoming
