= Barton County =

Barton County is the name of two counties in the United States:

- Barton County, Kansas
- Barton County, Missouri
