= Stark County =

Stark County may refer to:

- Stark County, Illinois
- Stark County, North Dakota
- Stark County, Ohio

== See also ==
- Starke County, Indiana
