= Pennington County =

Pennington County is the name of two counties in the United States:

- Pennington County, Minnesota
- Pennington County, South Dakota
