= Sherman County =

Sherman County is the name of four counties in the United States:

- Sherman County, Kansas
- Sherman County, Nebraska
- Sherman County, Oregon
- Sherman County, Texas
