= Pocahontas County =

Pocahontas County is the name of two counties in the United States:

- Pocahontas County, Iowa
- Pocahontas County, West Virginia
