= Powell County =

Powell County is the name of two counties in the United States:

- Powell County, Kentucky
- Powell County, Montana
