= Guadalupe County =

Guadalupe County is the name of several counties in the United States:

- Guadalupe County, New Mexico
- Guadalupe County, Texas
