= Walker County =

Walker County is the name of several counties in the United States:

- Walker County, Alabama
- Walker County, Georgia
- Walker County, Texas
