= Upshur County =

Upshur County is the name of two counties in the United States:

- Upshur County, Texas
- Upshur County, West Virginia
