= Curry County =

Curry County is the name of two counties in the United States:

- Curry County, New Mexico
- Curry County, Oregon
