= Rowan County =

Rowan County is the name of two counties in the United States:

- Rowan County, Kentucky
- Rowan County, North Carolina
