= Sussex County =

Sussex County may refer to:

== Australia ==
- Sussex County, Western Australia

== United States ==
- Sussex County, Delaware
- Sussex County, New Jersey
- Sussex County, Virginia

== England ==
- Sussex, also known as "the County of Sussex"
- Royal Sussex County Hospital in Brighton (sometimes informally referred to as the Sussex County)
