= Grundy County =

Grundy County is the name of four counties in the United States, all named in honor of Felix Grundy:

- Grundy County, Illinois
- Grundy County, Iowa
- Grundy County, Missouri
- Grundy County, Tennessee
