= Craig County =

Craig County is the name of two counties in the United States:

- Craig County, Oklahoma
- Craig County, Virginia
