= Mitchell County =

Mitchell County may refer to:

- Mitchell County, New South Wales, Australia
- Mitchell County, Georgia, United States
- Mitchell County, Iowa, United States
- Mitchell County, Kansas, United States
- Mitchell County, North Carolina, United States
- Mitchell County, Texas, United States
