= El Paso County =

El Paso County may refer to:

- El Paso County, Colorado
  - El Paso County, Jefferson Territory
  - El Paso County, Kansas Territory
- El Paso County, Texas
