= Morris County =

Morris County is the name of several counties in the United States:

- Morris County, Kansas
- Morris County, New Jersey, the most populous in the country with the name
- Morris County, Texas
