= Schuyler County =

Schuyler County is the name of several counties in the United States, all of which named after Philip Schuyler:

- Schuyler County, Illinois
- Schuyler County, Missouri
- Schuyler County, New York
