= Ellis County =

Ellis County is the name of several counties in the United States:

- Ellis County, Kansas
- Ellis County, Oklahoma
- Ellis County, Texas
