= Quitman County =

Quitman County is the name of two counties in the United States:

- Quitman County, Georgia
- Quitman County, Mississippi
