= Hale County =

Hale County is the name of two counties in the United States:

- Hale County, Alabama
- Hale County, Texas
