= Sevier County =

Sevier County is the name of several counties in the United States:

- Sevier County, Arkansas
- Sevier County, Tennessee
- Sevier County, Utah
