= Hyde County =

Hyde County is the name of two counties in the United States:

- Hyde County, North Carolina
- Hyde County, South Dakota
