= Woodford County =

Woodford County may refer to:

== Places ==
- Woodford County, Illinois
- Woodford County, Kentucky, originally Woodford County, Virginia (1788–1792)

== Schools ==
- Woodford County High School (Kentucky)
- Woodford County High School (London)
