= McHenry County =

McHenry County is the name of two counties in the United States:

- McHenry County, Illinois
- McHenry County, North Dakota
