= Midland County =

Midland County is the name of two counties in the United States:

- Midland County, Michigan
- Midland County, Texas
