= Hughes County =

Hughes County is the name of two counties in the United States:

- Hughes County, Oklahoma
- Hughes County, South Dakota
