= Brooks County =

Brooks County is the name of two counties in the United States:

- Brooks County, Georgia
- Brooks County, Texas
