= Dewey County =

Dewey County is the name of two counties in the United States:

- Dewey County, Oklahoma
- Dewey County, South Dakota
