= Barbour County =

Barbour County is the name of two counties in the United States:

- Barbour County, Alabama
- Barbour County, West Virginia
