= Armstrong County =

Armstrong County is the name of two counties in the United States:

- Armstrong County, Pennsylvania
- Armstrong County, Texas

It is also the name of a former county:

- Armstrong County, South Dakota
