= Stanton County =

Stanton County is the name of two counties in the United States:

- Stanton County, Kansas
- Stanton County, Nebraska
