= Winnebago County =

Winnebago County is the name of three counties in the United States:

- Winnebago County, Illinois
- Winnebago County, Iowa
- Winnebago County, Wisconsin
