= San Miguel County =

San Miguel County is the name of two counties in the United States:

- San Miguel County, Colorado
- San Miguel County, New Mexico
