= Rock County =

Rock County is the name of three counties in the United States:

- Rock County, Minnesota
- Rock County, Nebraska
- Rock County, Wisconsin
