= Pierce County =

Pierce County is the name of five counties in the United States.:

- Pierce County, Georgia
- Pierce County, Nebraska
- Pierce County, North Dakota
- Pierce County, Washington
- Pierce County, Wisconsin
