= Louisa County =

Louisa County is the name of two counties in the United States of America:

- Louisa County, Iowa
- Louisa County, Virginia
