= Orleans County =

Orleans County is the name of several counties in the United States:

- Orleans County, New York
- Orleans County, Vermont
- Orleans County, Louisiana, a historical political subdivision of Louisiana

== See also ==
- Orleans Parish, Louisiana, equivalent to a county in other states
