= Menominee County =

Menominee County is the name of two counties in the United States:

- Menominee County, Michigan
- Menominee County, Wisconsin
