= Humphreys County =

Humphreys County is the name of two counties in the United States:

- Humphreys County, Mississippi
- Humphreys County, Tennessee
