= Cleburne County =

Cleburne County is the name of two counties in the United States:

- Cleburne County, Alabama
- Cleburne County, Arkansas
