= Brunswick County =

Brunswick County is the name of two counties in the United States:

- Brunswick County, North Carolina
- Brunswick County, Virginia

== In fiction ==
- Brunswick County, Florida is a fictional location in John Grisham's novel The Whistler
