= Alexander County =

Alexander County is the name of two counties in the United States:

- Alexander County, Illinois
- Alexander County, North Carolina
