= Elbert County =

Elbert County is the name of two counties in the United States:

- Elbert County, Colorado
- Elbert County, Georgia
