= Walton County =

Walton County is the name of two counties in the United States:

- Walton County, Florida
- Walton County, Georgia

Walton County can also refer to:

- Walton County, Georgia (1803–1811), a former county of Georgia now part of North Carolina
