= Simpson County =

Simpson County is the name of two counties in the United States:

- Simpson County, Kentucky
- Simpson County, Mississippi
