= Wheeler County =

Wheeler County is the name of several counties in the United States:

- Wheeler County, Georgia
- Wheeler County, Nebraska
- Wheeler County, Oregon
- Wheeler County, Texas
