= Osceola County =

Osceola County is the name of three counties in the United States:

- Osceola County, Florida
- Osceola County, Iowa
- Osceola County, Michigan
