= Genesee County =

Genesee County is the name of two counties in the United States of America:

- Genesee County, Michigan
- Genesee County, New York
