= Alleghany County =

Alleghany County or Allegany County may refer to:

- Alleghany County, North Carolina, county seat Sparta
- Alleghany County, Virginia, in the Roanoke Region
- Allegany County, Maryland, county seat Cumberland
- Allegany County, New York, county seat Belmont

== See also ==
- Allegheny County, Pennsylvania, home to Pittsburgh
