= Lamar County =

Lamar County is the name of several counties in the United States:

- Lamar County, Alabama
- Lamar County, Georgia
- Lamar County, Mississippi
- Lamar County, Texas
