= Wabash County =

Wabash County is the name of two counties in the United States:

- Wabash County, Illinois
- Wabash County, Indiana
