= Northumberland County =

Northumberland County may refer to:

== Australia ==
- Northumberland County, New South Wales, a cadastral division

== Canada ==
- Northumberland County, New Brunswick
- Northumberland County, Ontario

== United Kingdom ==
- Northumberland, a county of England

== United States ==
- Northumberland County, Pennsylvania
- Northumberland County, Virginia
