= Lyon County =

Lyon County is the name of five counties in the United States:

- Lyon County, Iowa
- Lyon County, Kansas
- Lyon County, Kentucky
- Lyon County, Minnesota
- Lyon County, Nevada
