= Bradley County =

Bradley County is the name of two counties in the United States:

- Bradley County, Arkansas
- Bradley County, Tennessee
