= St. Louis County =

St. Louis County is the name of two counties in the United States:

- St. Louis County, Missouri
- St. Louis County, Minnesota
