= Surry County =

Surry County is the name of two counties in the United States:

- Surry County, North Carolina
- Surry County, Virginia

== See also ==
- Surrey
