= Sumner County =

Sumner County is the name of two counties in the United States:

- Sumner County, Kansas
- Sumner County, Tennessee
