= Eddy County =

Eddy County is the name of two counties in the United States:

- Eddy County, New Mexico
- Eddy County, North Dakota
