= Dunn County =

Dunn County is the name of two counties in the United States:

- Dunn County, North Dakota
- Dunn County, Wisconsin
