= Lists of counties in the United States =

An enlargeable map of the counties and county equivalents located in the 50 U.S. states and Washington, D.C. as of 2020. Connecticut's nine councils of government and the 100 county equivalents in the U.S. territories are not on this map.

The following are lists of U.S. counties and county-equivalents by various criteria.

== By state ==
- Alabama
- Alaska
- Arizona
- Arkansas
- California
- Colorado
- Connecticut
  - Historical Connecticut counties
  - Connecticut councils of governments
- Delaware
- Florida
- Georgia
- Hawaii
- Idaho
- Illinois
- Indiana
- Iowa
- Kansas
- Kentucky
- Louisiana
- Maine
- Maryland
- Massachusetts
- Michigan
- Minnesota
- Mississippi
- Missouri
- Montana
- Nebraska
- Nevada
- New Hampshire
- New Jersey
- New Mexico
- New York
- North Carolina
- North Dakota
- Ohio
- Oklahoma
- Oregon
- Pennsylvania
- Rhode Island
- South Carolina
- South Dakota
- Tennessee
- Texas
- Utah
- Vermont
- Virginia
- Washington
- West Virginia
- Wisconsin
- Wyoming

== In U.S. territories and federal district ==
The United States Census Bureau also divides the U.S. territories and the District of Columbia into county-equivalents:

- American Samoa's districts and atolls
- Guam is counted as a single county-equivalent
- Northern Mariana Islands municipalities
- Puerto Rico municipalities
- Each main island of the U.S. Virgin Islands
- Each island of the United States Minor Outlying Islands
- Washington, D.C. is counted as a single county-equivalent

== By name ==
- Sortable Table
- A
- B
- C
- D
- E
- F
- G
- H
- I
- J
- K
- L
- M
- N
- O
- P
- Q
- R
- S
- T
- U
- V
- W
- Y
- Z
- Most common

== By name origin ==
- (A–D)
- (E–I)
- (J–M)
- (N–R)
- (S–Z)
- Rivers
- Presidents
- Women
- Confederates

== By demographics ==
- Highest population
- Most African Americans
- Most Hispanics or Latinos
- Most Native Americans
- Poorest
- Richest

== By geography ==
- Largest by area
- Highest mean elevation
- Statistical areas
