= List of country subdivisions named after people =

This is a list of country subdivisions named after people. It details the name of the country subdivision and eponym. The etymology is generally referenced in the article about the person or the administrative division.

This is a summary from List of etymologies of administrative divisions.

== Argentina ==
- Colón Department, Córdoba – Christopher Columbus
- Colón Department, Entre Ríos – Christopher Columbus

== Australia ==
- Jervis Bay Territory – John Jervis, 1st Earl of St Vincent
- Queensland – Queen Victoria
- Tasmania – Abel Tasman
- Victoria – Queen Victoria

== Bermuda ==
- Devonshire Parish – William Cavendish, 1st Earl of Devonshire
- Hamilton Parish – James Hamilton, 2nd Marquess of Hamilton
- Paget Parish – William Paget, 4th Baron Paget de Beaudesert
- Pembroke Parish – William Herbert, 3rd Earl of Pembroke
- St. George's Parish – St. George
- Sandys Parish – Sir Edwin Sandys
- Smith's Parish – Sir Thomas Smith (English aristocrat)
- Southampton Parish – Henry Wriothesley, 3rd Earl of Southampton
- Warwick Parish – Robert Rich, 2nd Earl of Warwick

== Brazil ==
- Rondônia – Marshal Cândido Rondon
- Santa Catarina – Saint Catherine
- São Paulo – Saint Paul

== Cameroon ==
- Adamaoua Region – Modibbo Adama

== Canada ==
- Alberta – Princess Louise Caroline Alberta, fourth daughter of Queen Victoria
- British Columbia – Christopher Columbus (→ Columbia, an American sailing ship → Columbia River → Columbia Territory of the Hudson's Bay Company → British Columbia)
- Prince Edward Island – Prince George, Duke of Kent (son of George III of the United Kingdom), commander of British forces in Halifax, Nova Scotia

== Chile ==
- Santiago Metropolitan Region – Saint James the Greater
- O'Higgins Region – Bernardo O'Higgins
- Aisén (region) – Carlos Ibáñez del Campo (officially, Aysén del General Carlos Ibáñez del Campo Region)
- Magallanes Region – Ferdinand Magellan
- Magallanes Province – Ferdinand Magellan

== Colombia ==
- Bogotá – Bacatá – an indigenous cacique (emperor)
- Bolívar Department – Simón Bolívar
- Caldas Department – Francisco José de Caldas
- Nariño Department – Antonio Nariño
- Norte de Santander Department – Francisco de Paula Santander
- Santander Department – Francisco de Paula Santander
- Sucre Department – Antonio José de Sucre
- Córdoba Department – José María Córdoba

== Dominican Republic ==
- Duarte – Juan Pablo Duarte
- Espaillat – Ulises Francisco Espaillat (author and president)
- María Trinidad Sánchez – María Trinidad Sánchez (female soldier)
- Monseñor Nouel – Monseñor Dr. Adolfo Alejandro Nouel y Bobadilla (archbishop and president)
- Sánchez Ramírez – Brigadier Juan Sánchez Ramírez

== Ecuador ==
- Bolívar Province – Simón Bolívar
- Orellana Province – Francisco de Orellana

== Estonia ==
- Valga County – from German family names de Walco or de Walko.

== France ==
- Adélie Land – Adèle Dumont d'Urville, wife of Jules Dumont d'Urville
- Bassas da India – Fernão de Loronha
- Crozet Islands – Julien-Marie Crozet
- Juan de Nova Island – João da Nova
- Kerguelen Islands – Yves-Joseph de Kerguelen-Trémarec
- Saint Paul Island – Saint Paul
- Tromelin Island – Jacques Marie Boudin de Tromelin, Chevalier de La Nuguy

== Guatemala ==
- Santa Rosa Department – Rose of Lima

== Honduras ==
- Colón Department – Christopher Columbus
- Francisco Morazán Department – Francisco Morazán

== India ==
- YSR Kadapa district – Y. S. Rajasekhara Reddy, Chief Minister of Andhra Pradesh

== Ireland ==
- County Kilkenny – Cainnech of Aghaboe
- County Offaly – Failge Berraide
- County Roscommon – Coman mac Faelchon
- County Tyrone – Eógan mac Néill

== Italy ==
- Aosta Valley – Augustus
- Emilia-Romagna – Marcus Aemilius Lepidus (consul 187 BC)
- Friuli-Venezia Giulia – Julius Caesar

== Jamaica ==
- Clarendon Parish – Edward Hyde, 1st Earl of Clarendon
- Hanover Parish – George I of Great Britain, of the House of Hanover
- Saint Ann Parish – Lady Anne Hyde (first wife of James II of England)
- Saint Elizabeth Parish – Elizabeth Modyford (wife of Sir Thomas Modyford, 1st Baronet, the first English colonial governor of Jamaica)
- Saint James Parish – James II of England
- Trelawny Parish – Sir William Trelawny, 6th Baronet

== Kazakhstan ==
- Abai Region – Abai Qunanbaiuly
- Jambyl Region – Zhambyl Zhabayuly
- Pavlodar Region – Grand Duke Paul Alexandrovich of Russia

== Malaysia ==
- Putrajaya – Tunku Abdul Rahman

== Mexico ==
- Guerrero – Vicente Guerrero
- Hidalgo – Miguel Hidalgo
- Morelos – José María Morelos
- Quintana Roo – Andrés Quintana Roo
- Veracruz-Llave – Ignacio de la Llave

== New Zealand ==
- Auckland Region – Earl of Auckland
- Cook Islands – Captain James Cook
- Gisborne District – William Gisborne
- Hawke's Bay – Edward Hawke
- Marlborough District – Duke of Marlborough
- Nelson City – Horatio Nelson
- Tasman District – Abel Tasman
- Wellington Region – Duke of Wellington

== Nigeria ==
- Adamawa State – Modibbo Adama

== Norway ==
- Jan Mayen – Jan Jacobszoon May van Schellinkhout
- Queen Maud Land – Queen Maud of Norway

== Panama ==
- Colón Province – Christopher Columbus
- Colón District – Christopher Columbus

== Papua New Guinea ==
- Bougainville Province – Louis Antoine de Bougainville

== Paraguay ==
- Presidente Hayes – President Rutherford B. Hayes of the United States

== Perù ==
- Department of San Martín – José de San Martín

== Philippines ==
- Aurora – Aurora Aragon Quezon
- Isabela – Queen Isabella II of Spain
- Quezon – Manuel Luis Quezon
- Quirino – Elpidio Quirino
- Rizal – José Rizal
- Sultan Kudarat – Muhammad Kudarat

== Portugal ==
- Santarém – from Saint Irene of Tomar

== Romania ==
- Bessarabia – Basarab I

== Russia ==
- Arkhangelsk Oblast – Archangel Michael
- Kaliningrad Oblast – Mikhail Kalinin
- Khabarovsk Krai – Yerofey Khabarov
- Kirov Oblast – Sergei Kirov
- Leningrad Oblast – Vladimir Lenin
- Saint Petersburg – Saint Peter
- Sverdlovsk Oblast – Yakov Sverdlov
- Ulyanovsk Oblast – Vladimir Lenin
- Vladimir Oblast – Vladimir the Great
- Yaroslavl Oblast – Yaroslav the Wise

== Turkmenistan ==
- Arkadag – Gurbanguly Berdimuhamedow

== Ukraine ==
- Dnipropetrovsk Oblast – Grigory Petrovsky
- Ivano-Frankivsk Oblast – Ivan Franko
- Khmelnytskyi Oblast – Bohdan Khmelnytsky
- Kirovohrad Oblast – Sergei Kirov
- Kyiv – Kyi
- Kyiv Oblast – Kyi
- Lviv Oblast – Leo I of Galicia
- Mykolaiv Oblast – Saint Nicholas

== United Kingdom ==
- Anglesey – Ongull, a Scandinavian landowner
- Angus – King Oengus I of the Picts
- Bedfordshire – Bieda, a Saxon landowner ("Bieda's ford" + shire)
- Brecknockshire – Prince Brychan
- Buckinghamshire – Bucca, a Saxon landowner ("Bucca's home" + shire)
- Cardigan – Ceredig, son of Cunedda
- Fife – Fib of the Picts, one of the seven sons of Cruithe
- Glamorgan – Prince Morgan the Old of Gwent
- Gwynedd – Cunedda
- Hampshire – Hamo, a 6th-century Saxon settler and landowner
- Kirkcudbright – Saint Cuthbert ("church of Cuthbert")
- Lothian – Leudonus
- Merionethshire – Meirion, son of Cunedda
- Montgomery, Powys – Roger de Montgomery
- Nottinghamshire – Snot, a Saxon landowner ("Snot's home" + shire)
- Roxburghshire – Hroc, an ancient landowner ("Hroc's fortress" + shire)
- Rutland – Rota, a Saxon landowner ("Rota's land")

Dependencies

- Bermuda – Juan de Bermúdez (see the paragraph Bermuda above for its subdivisions)
- Falkland Islands – Anthony Cary, 5th Viscount Falkland
- Gibraltar – Arabic Jabal Tāriq (جبل طارق), meaning "mountain of Tariq", because Tariq ibn-Ziyad, the militar leader of the Muslim invasion of Spain in 711, landed there from Africa
- Saint Helena, Ascension and Tristan da Cunha – Helena of Constantinople, and Tristão da Cunha
- South Georgia and the South Sandwich Islands – George III and John Montagu, 4th Earl of Sandwich, respectively.

== United States ==
This is a summary from List of U.S. state name etymologies.

- Delaware – Thomas West, 3rd Baron De La Warr
- District of Columbia – Christopher Columbus
- Georgia – King George II of Great Britain
- Louisiana – King Louis XIV of France
- Maryland – Henrietta Maria of France, wife of Charles I
- New York – James Stuart, Duke of York (later James II of England)
- Northern Mariana Islands – Mariana of Austria, Queen of Spain
- North Carolina and South Carolina – King Charles I of England
- Pennsylvania – Admiral Sir William Penn
- Virginia and West Virginia – Queen Elizabeth I of England, the "Virgin Queen"
- Washington – George Washington

Related lists:

- List of U.S. counties named after women
- Lists of U.S. county name etymologies

== Uruguay ==
- Artigas Department – José Artigas
- Flores Department – Venancio Flores
- Rivera Department – José Eustasio Rivera
- Treinta y Tres Department – Thirty-Three Orientals

== Venezuela ==
- Anzoátegui – José Antonio Anzoátegui
- Bolívar – Simón Bolívar
- Falcón – Juan Crisóstomo Falcón
- Lara – Jacinto Lara
- Miranda – Francisco de Miranda
- Monagas – José Tadeo Monagas
- Sucre – Antonio José de Sucre
- Vargas (former) – José María Vargas

== See also ==
- List of etymologies of administrative divisions
- List of eponyms
- List of places named after people
