= List of the most common U.S. county name etymologies =

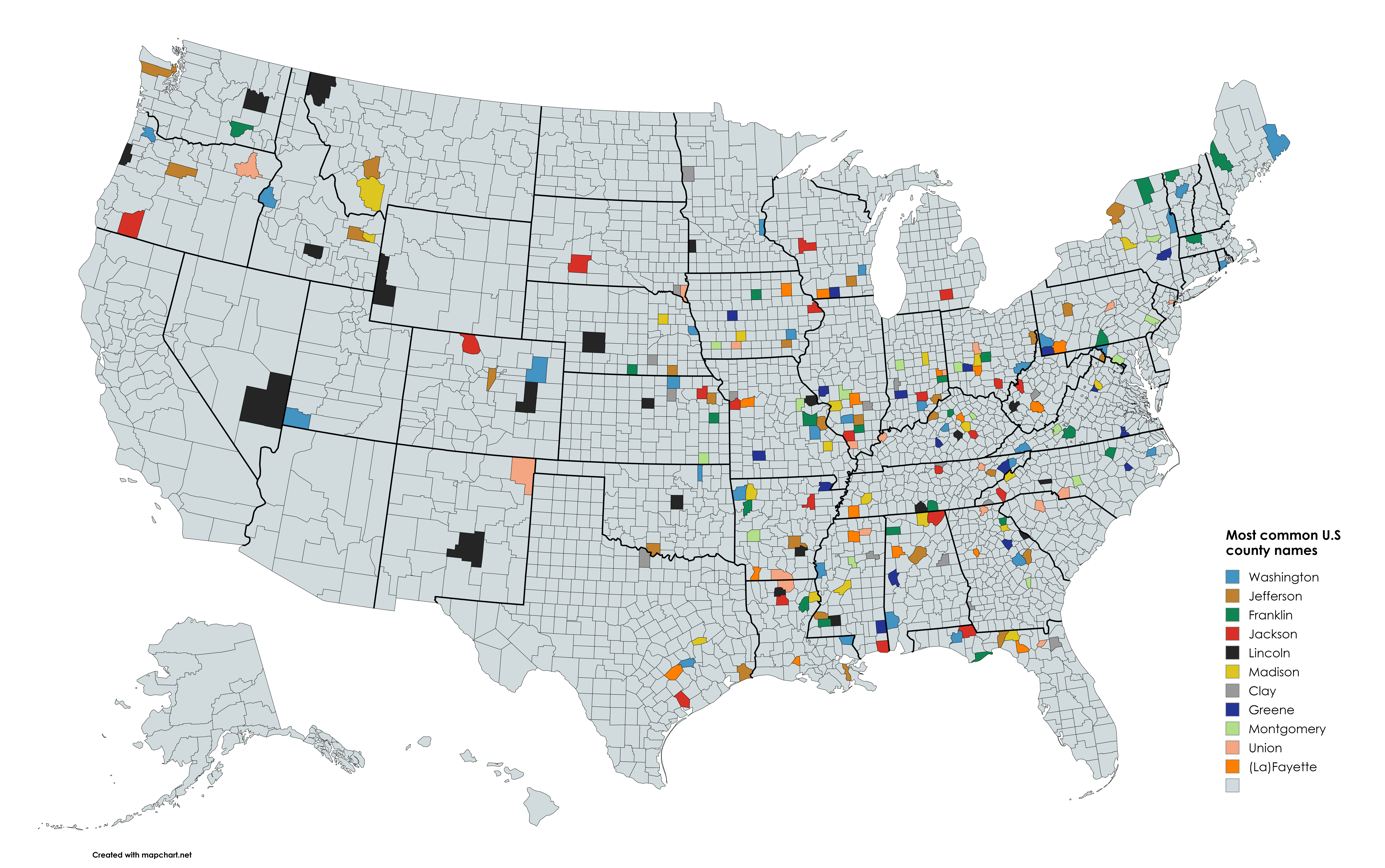
Most common etymologies of U.S. County names

This is a list of the most common U.S. county name etymologies, specifically the names with five or more counties sharing the name

== Washington County (31 counties) ==
All of the Washington Counties in the United States are named for George Washington, first President of the United States.

- Washington County, Alabama
- Washington County, Arkansas
- Washington County, Colorado
- Washington County, Florida
- Washington County, Georgia
- Washington County, Idaho
- Washington County, Illinois
- Washington County, Indiana
- Washington County, Iowa
- Washington County, Kansas
- Washington County, Kentucky
- Washington County, Maine
- Washington County, Maryland
- Washington County, Minnesota
- Washington County, Mississippi
- Washington County, Missouri
- Washington County, Nebraska
- Washington County, New York
- Washington County, North Carolina
- Washington County, Ohio
- Washington County, Oklahoma
- Washington County, Oregon
- Washington County, Pennsylvania
- Washington County, Rhode Island
- Washington County, Tennessee
- Washington County, Texas
- Washington County, Utah
- Washington County, Vermont
- Washington County, Virginia
- Washington County, Wisconsin
- Washington Parish, Louisiana

== Jefferson County (26 counties) ==
Twenty three of the twenty six Jefferson Counties in the United States are directly named for Thomas Jefferson, the third President, and the remaining three are indirectly named for him.

- Jefferson County, Alabama
- Jefferson County, Arkansas
- Jefferson County, Colorado: named for the Territory of Jefferson, which extralegally governed the area before the United States Congress established the Colorado Territory, the territory in turn was named for Thomas Jefferson
- Jefferson County, Florida
- Jefferson County, Georgia
- Jefferson County, Idaho
- Jefferson County, Illinois
- Jefferson County, Indiana
- Jefferson County, Iowa
- Jefferson County, Kansas
- Jefferson County, Kentucky
- Jefferson County, Mississippi
- Jefferson County, Missouri
- Jefferson County, Montana: named for the Jefferson River, in turn named for Thomas Jefferson
- Jefferson County, Nebraska
- Jefferson County, New York
- Jefferson County, Ohio
- Jefferson County, Oklahoma
- Jefferson County, Oregon: named for Mount Jefferson on the county's western boundary, in turn named for Thomas Jefferson
- Jefferson County, Pennsylvania
- Jefferson County, Tennessee
- Jefferson County, Texas
- Jefferson County, Washington
- Jefferson County, West Virginia
- Jefferson County, Wisconsin
- Jefferson Parish, Louisiana

== Franklin County (25 counties) ==
Twenty three of the twenty five Franklin Counties in the United States are named for Benjamin Franklin, the famous Founding Father, printer, scientist, philosopher, and diplomat.

- Franklin County, Alabama
- Franklin County, Arkansas
- Franklin County, Florida
- Franklin County, Georgia
- Franklin County, Idaho: named for Franklin, Idaho, the first town in the state, in turn named for Franklin Richards, an apostle of the Church of Jesus Christ of Latter-day Saints
- Franklin County, Illinois
- Franklin County, Indiana
- Franklin County, Iowa
- Franklin County, Kansas
- Franklin County, Kentucky
- Franklin County, Maine
- Franklin County, Massachusetts
- Franklin County, Mississippi
- Franklin County, Missouri
- Franklin County, Nebraska
- Franklin County, New York
- Franklin County, North Carolina
- Franklin County, Ohio
- Franklin County, Pennsylvania
- Franklin County, Tennessee
- Franklin County, Texas: probably named for Benjamin Cromwell Franklin, an early judge and legislator in Texas
- Franklin County, Vermont
- Franklin County, Virginia
- Franklin County, Washington
- Franklin Parish, Louisiana

== Jackson County (24 counties) ==
Twenty one of the twenty four Jackson Counties in the United States are named for Andrew Jackson, the seventh President.

- Jackson County, Alabama
- Jackson County, Arkansas
- Jackson County, Colorado
- Jackson County, Florida
- Jackson County, Georgia: named for James Jackson, the 23rd governor of Georgia
- Jackson County, Illinois
- Jackson County, Indiana
- Jackson County, Iowa
- Jackson County, Kansas
- Jackson County, Kentucky
- Jackson County, Michigan
- Jackson County, Minnesota: named for Henry Jackson, a member of the first Minnesota Territory legislature
- Jackson County, Mississippi
- Jackson County, Missouri
- Jackson County, North Carolina
- Jackson County, Ohio
- Jackson County, Oklahoma: named for Thomas Jonathan "Stonewall" Jackson, the famous Confederate general
- Jackson County, Oregon
- Jackson County, South Dakota
- Jackson County, Tennessee
- Jackson County, Texas
- Jackson County, West Virginia
- Jackson County, Wisconsin
- Jackson Parish, Louisiana

== Lincoln County (24 counties) ==
Sixteen (possibly seventeen) of the twenty four Lincoln Counties in the United States are named for Abraham Lincoln, the sixteenth President; five other Lincoln counties are named for Benjamin Lincoln, a leading general in the American Revolutionary War and distant relative of Abraham.

- Lincoln County, Arkansas
- Lincoln County, Colorado
- Lincoln County, Georgia: named for Benjamin Lincoln
- Lincoln County, Idaho
- Lincoln County, Kansas
- Lincoln County, Kentucky: named for Benjamin Lincoln
- Lincoln County, Maine: named for the city of Lincoln, England
- Lincoln County, Minnesota
- Lincoln County, Mississippi
- Lincoln County, Missouri: named for Benjamin Lincoln
- Lincoln County, Montana: named for Abraham Lincoln
- Lincoln County, Nebraska
- Lincoln County, Nevada
- Lincoln County, New Mexico
- Lincoln County, North Carolina: named for Benjamin Lincoln
- Lincoln County, Oklahoma
- Lincoln County, Oregon
- Lincoln County, South Dakota: named for Lincoln County, Maine
- Lincoln County, Tennessee: named for Benjamin Lincoln
- Lincoln County, Washington
- Lincoln County, West Virginia
- Lincoln County, Wisconsin
- Lincoln County, Wyoming
- Lincoln Parish, Louisiana

== Madison County (20 counties) ==
Eighteen of the twenty Madison Counties in the United States are named for James Madison, the fourth President, and both of the two exceptions are indirectly named for him.

- Madison County, Alabama
- Madison County, Arkansas
- Madison County, Florida
- Madison County, Georgia
- Madison County, Idaho
- Madison County, Illinois
- Madison County, Indiana
- Madison County, Iowa
- Madison County, Kentucky
- Madison County, Mississippi
- Madison County, Missouri
- Madison County, Montana: named for the Madison River, named in turn for James Madison
- Madison County, Nebraska: probably named for Madison, Wisconsin, where most of the new county's settlers were from, named for James Madison
- Madison County, New York
- Madison County, North Carolina
- Madison County, Ohio
- Madison County, Tennessee
- Madison County, Texas
- Madison County, Virginia
- Madison Parish, Louisiana

== Clay County (18 counties) ==
Fifteen of the eighteen Clay Counties in the United States are named for Henry Clay, the Kentucky statesman. Two of the exceptions, including one in Kentucky, are named for members of Henry Clay's family.

- Clay County, Alabama
- Clay County, Arkansas: named for John Clayton, a member of the Arkansas Senate
- Clay County, Florida
- Clay County, Georgia
- Clay County, Illinois
- Clay County, Indiana
- Clay County, Iowa: named for Henry Clay's son, Henry Clay, Jr., a general who died during the Mexican–American War
- Clay County, Kansas
- Clay County, Kentucky: named for Henry Clay's cousin, Green Clay, a general in the War of 1812
- Clay County, Minnesota
- Clay County, Mississippi
- Clay County, Missouri
- Clay County, Nebraska
- Clay County, North Carolina
- Clay County, South Dakota
- Clay County, Tennessee
- Clay County, Texas
- Clay County, West Virginia

== Greene County and variants (17 counties) ==
All Greene Counties in the United States are named after Nathanael Greene, a major general in the Continental Army during the American Revolutionary War.

- Greene County, Alabama
- Greene County, Arkansas
- Greene County, Georgia
- Greene County, Illinois
- Greene County, Indiana
- Greene County, Iowa
- Greene County, Mississippi
- Greene County, Missouri
- Greene County, New York
- Greene County, North Carolina
- Greene County, Ohio
- Greene County, Pennsylvania
- Greene County, Tennessee
- Greene County, Virginia

Two Green Counties, despite the difference in spelling, are also named after the aforementioned Nathanael Greene.

- Green County, Kentucky
- Green County, Wisconsin

One other county may have been named after Greene, although there is evidence that it was instead named for Richard Grenville, leader of the settlement on Roanoke Island.

- Greensville County, Virginia

== Montgomery County (18 counties) ==
Most (at least 13 out of 18) Montgomery Counties in the United States are named after Richard Montgomery, a major general in the Continental Army killed in the 1775 Battle of Quebec.

- Montgomery County, Alabama (This county was not named for Richard Montgomery, but for another general, Lemuel P. Montgomery; oddly, the city of Montgomery, Alabama in it was named for Richard Montgomery.)
- Montgomery County, Arkansas - Richard Montgomery
- Montgomery County, Georgia - Richard Montgomery
- Montgomery County, Illinois - Richard Montgomery
- Montgomery County, Indiana - Richard Montgomery
- Montgomery County, Iowa - Richard Montgomery
- Montgomery County, Kansas - Richard Montgomery
- Montgomery County, Kentucky - Richard Montgomery
- Montgomery County, Maryland - Richard Montgomery
- Montgomery County, Mississippi (Possibly for Richard Montgomery. Possibly for Montgomery County, Tennessee, from which an early settler came.)
- Montgomery County, Missouri - Richard Montgomery
- Montgomery County, New York - Richard Montgomery
- Montgomery County, North Carolina - Richard Montgomery
- Montgomery County, Ohio - Richard Montgomery
- Montgomery County, Pennsylvania (there is some question as to whether this one was named for Richard Montgomery. It seems to be the case, but it is uncertain.)
- Montgomery County, Tennessee (This county was not named for Richard Montgomery, but for John Montgomery, a local settler)
- Montgomery County, Texas (This county was named after the town of Montgomery, Texas which in turn was named after Montgomery County, Alabama.)
- Montgomery County, Virginia - Richard Montgomery

== Union County (18 counties) ==
- Union County, Arkansas: Named for the statement in the citizen's petition for a new county that the citizens of the area they were petitioning "in the spirit of Union and Unity."
- Union County, Florida: Named to honor the concept of unity.
- Union County, Georgia
- Union County, Illinois
- Union County, Indiana
- Union County, Iowa
- Union County, Kentucky
- Union County, Mississippi
- Union County, New Jersey
- Union County, New Mexico: Formed as a union of parts of three surrounding counties, Colfax, Mora, and San Miguel.
- Union County, North Carolina: Named as a compromise between Whigs, who wanted to name the new county after Henry Clay, and Democrats, who wanted to name it after Andrew Jackson.
- Union County, Ohio: Named because it is a union of portions of Delaware, Franklin, Logan, and Madison counties.
- Union County, Oregon
- Union County, Pennsylvania
- Union County, South Carolina
- Union County, South Dakota
- Union County, Tennessee
- Union Parish, Louisiana

== Fayette and Lafayette counties (17 counties) ==
Despite the difference in name, all of these counties (including one Louisiana parish) are named after the same individual—Gilbert du Motier, Marquis de Lafayette, a French general who played a major role in the American Revolutionary War.

- Fayette County, Alabama
- Fayette County, Georgia
- Fayette County, Illinois
- Fayette County, Indiana
- Fayette County, Iowa
- Fayette County, Kentucky (coterminous with the city of Lexington)
- Fayette County, Ohio
- Fayette County, Pennsylvania
- Fayette County, Tennessee
- Fayette County, Texas
- Fayette County, West Virginia
- Lafayette County, Arkansas
- Lafayette County, Florida
- Lafayette County, Mississippi
- Lafayette County, Missouri
- Lafayette County, Wisconsin
- Lafayette Parish, Louisiana

== See also ==
- Lists of U.S. county name etymologies
- List of the most common U.S. county names
