= Lists of North American place name etymologies =

These are lists of North American place name etymologies.

== General list ==
- List of Canada city name etymologies
- List of Canadian provincial and territorial name etymologies
- List of Mexican state name etymologies
- List of state and territory name etymologies of the United States
- List of the most common U.S. county name etymologies
- List of U.S. places named after non-U.S. places

== United States ==
- List of U.S. county name etymologies (A–D)
- List of U.S. county name etymologies (E–I)
- List of U.S. county name etymologies (J–M)
- List of U.S. county name etymologies (N–R)
- List of U.S. county name etymologies (S–Z)
- List of U.S. counties named after presidents of the United States
- List of U.S. counties named after prominent Confederate historical figures
- List of U.S. counties named after rivers
- List of U.S. counties named after women
- List of place names of Choctaw origin
- List of place names of Czech origin in the United States
- List of place names of Dutch origin in the United States
- List of place names of French origin in the United States
- List of place names of German origin in the United States
- List of place names of Native American origin in the United States
  - List of place names of Native American origin in New England
- List of place names of Polish origin in the United States
- List of place names of Scottish origin in the United States
- List of place names of Spanish origin in the United States
- List of place names of Swedish origin in the United States
- List of place names of Ukrainian origin in the United States
- List of place names of Welsh origin in the United States

== By U.S. state ==
- List of Alabama county name etymologies
- List of Alaska borough and census area name etymologies
- List of Arizona county name etymologies
- List of Arkansas county name etymologies
- List of California county name etymologies
  - Etymologies of place names in Los Angeles, California
  - Etymologies of street names in San Francisco, California
- List of Colorado county name etymologies
- List of Connecticut county name etymologies
- List of Delaware county name etymologies
- List of Florida county name etymologies
- List of Georgia county name etymologies
- List of Hawaii county name etymologies
- List of Idaho county name etymologies
- List of Illinois county name etymologies
- List of Indiana county name etymologies
- List of Iowa county name etymologies
- List of Kansas county name etymologies
- List of Kentucky county name etymologies
- List of Louisiana parish name etymologies
- List of Maine county name etymologies
- List of Maryland county name etymologies
- List of Massachusetts county name etymologies
- List of Michigan county name etymologies
- List of Minnesota county name etymologies
- List of Mississippi county name etymologies
- List of Missouri county name etymologies
- List of Montana county name etymologies
- List of Nebraska county name etymologies
- List of Nevada county name etymologies
- List of New Hampshire county name etymologies
- List of New Jersey county name etymologies
  - Etymologies of place names in Hudson County, New Jersey
  - Toponymy of Bergen, New Netherland
- List of New Mexico county name etymologies
- List of New York county name etymologies
- List of North Carolina county name etymologies
- List of North Dakota county name etymologies
- List of Ohio county name etymologies
- List of Oklahoma county name etymologies
- List of Oregon county name etymologies
- List of Pennsylvania county name etymologies
  - List of place names of Native American origin in Pennsylvania
  - Etymologies of place names in Philadelphia, Pennsylvania
- List of Rhode Island county name etymologies
- List of South Carolina county name etymologies
- List of South Dakota county name etymologies
- List of Tennessee county name etymologies
- List of Texas county name etymologies
  - List of Texas county seat name etymologies
- List of Utah county name etymologies
- List of Vermont county name etymologies
- List of Virginia county name etymologies
- List of Washington county name etymologies
- List of West Virginia county name etymologies
- List of Wisconsin county name etymologies
- List of Wyoming county name etymologies
