= List of U.S. county name etymologies (E–I) =

This is a list of U.S. county name etymologies, covering the letters E to I.

== E ==
County name	State	Name origin
Eagle County	Colorado	The Eagle River, which runs through the county
Early County	Georgia	Peter Early, Governor of Georgia from 1813 to 1815, Superior Court Judge, and U.S. Congressman
East Baton Rouge Parish	Louisiana	Named for the largest city therein and the state capital, Baton Rouge, which itself comes from the French Baton Rouge, meaning "red stick". Records of Pierre Le Moyne d'Iberville describe large reddened poles erected by Indians with fish and bear heads attached in sacrifice. These may have designated boundaries separating the hunting grounds of the Bayou Goula and the Houma tribes.
East Carroll Parish	Louisiana	Charles Carroll of Carrollton, the last surviving signer of the U.S. Declaration of Independence
East Feliciana Parish	Louisiana	Either from Spanish feliciana, meaning "happy land", or from "Felicite", the wife of Bernardo de Gálvez, a governor of Spanish Louisiana (1777–1783)
Eastland County	Texas	William Mosby Eastland, a soldier during the Texas Revolution and the only officer to die as a result of the so-called "Black Bean" executions following the Mier expedition
Eaton County	Michigan	John Eaton (1790–1856), Secretary of War under President Andrew Jackson
Eau Claire County	Wisconsin	From the Eau Claire River, French for "clear water."
Echols County	Georgia	Robert Milner Echols, a member of the Georgia General Assembly for 24 years and a Georgia State Senate President, who died serving as a brigadier general during the Mexican–American War
Ector County	Texas	Mathew Ector, a Confederate general in the American Civil War
Eddy County	New Mexico	Charles B. Eddy, the first cattleman in the area
Eddy County	North Dakota	Ezra B. Eddy, a Fargo banker
Edgar County	Illinois	John Edgar (c. 1750 – 1832), Illinois delegate to the Northwest Territory legislature and at the time the wealthiest man in Illinois
Edgecombe County	North Carolina	From Richard Edgcumbe, 1st Baron Edgcumbe, 18th century English politician.
Edgefield County	South Carolina	Uncertain origin, there are many theories.
Edmonson County	Kentucky	John Edmonson (1764–1813), a military captain killed at the Battle of River Raisin
Edmunds County	South Dakota	Governor of Dakota territory Newton Edmunds
Edwards County	Illinois	Ninian Edwards (1775–1833), third Governor of the State of Illinois and only governor of the Illinois Territory
Edwards County	Kansas	John H. Edwards, Kansas State Senator
Edwards County	Texas	Haden Harrison Edwards, an early settler
Effingham County	Georgia	Thomas Howard, 3rd Earl of Effingham (1746–1791), who was sympathetic to the independence movement and refused to take up arms against the revolutionaries
Effingham County	Illinois	Either for Thomas Howard, 3rd Earl of Effingham (1746–1791), who was sympathetic to the independence movement and refused to take up arms against the revolutionaries, or for a local surveyor whose last name was Effingham
El Dorado County	California	From the mythical El Dorado, "The Gilded One", in relation to the county's importance during the California Gold Rush
El Paso County	Colorado	Named for Ute Pass, an important mountain pass through the Front Range which was known to early Spanish settlers as El Paso or "The Pass"
El Paso County	Texas	Short for El Paso del Norte, which is Spanish for "The Pass of the North". It is named for the pass the Rio Grande creates through the mountains on either side of the river.
Elbert County	Colorado	Samuel Hitt Elbert, 6th Territorial Governor of Colorado (1873–1874)
Elbert County	Georgia	Samuel Elbert (1740–1788), a Revolutionary War hero and an early governor of Georgia
Elk County	Kansas	The Elk River
Elk County	Pennsylvania	The eastern elk, a subspecies of elk that was formerly native to Pennsylvania but has been extinct since 1877
Elkhart County	Indiana	The Elkhart Native American people
Elko County	Nevada	From Elko, Nevada, of uncertain origin; possibly created by Charles Crocker who added an "-o" to "Elk."
Elliott County	Kentucky	Either John Lisle Elliott or John Milton Elliott (1820–1885), legislators from Kentucky
Ellis County	Kansas	George Ellis
Ellis County	Oklahoma	Abraham H. Ellis, a member of the Constitutional Convention
Ellis County	Texas	Richard Ellis, president of the convention that produced the Texas Declaration of Independence
Ellsworth County	Kansas	Fort Ellsworth
Elmore County	Alabama	John Archer Elmore (1762–1834), a Revolutionary War veteran
Elmore County	Idaho	The Ida Elmore mines, locally noted for gold and silver production in the 1860s
Emanuel County	Georgia	David Emanuel, 24th Governor of Georgia (1801)
Emery County	Utah	George W. Emery, 11th Governor of the Utah Territory (1875–1880)
Emmett County	Iowa	Robert Emmet (1778–1803), an Irish nationalist and rebel leader
Emmet County	Michigan	Robert Emmet (1778–1803), an Irish nationalist and rebel leader
Emmons County	North Dakota	James Emmons, a steamboat operator and early Bismarck merchant and entrepreneur
City of Emporia	Virginia	Named after Emporia, Kansas
Erath County	Texas	George Bernard Erath, an early surveyor and a soldier at the Battle of San Jacinto during the Texas Revolution
Erie County	New York	Lake Erie, named in turn after the Erie people
Erie County	Ohio	Lake Erie, named in turn after the Erie people
Erie County	Pennsylvania	Lake Erie, named in turn after the Erie people
Escambia County	Alabama	Escambia Creek, a tributary of the Conecuh River
Escambia County	Florida	Unknown; most likely taken from a Native American word
Esmeralda County	Nevada	The Esmeralda Mining District, which an early Nevada miner, J.M. Corey, named after the gypsy dancer Esmeralda from Victor Hugo's novel The Hunchback of Notre-Dame. Esmeralda is Spanish for "emerald".
Essex County	Massachusetts	The English county of Essex
Essex County	New Jersey	The English county of Essex
Essex County	New York	The English county of Essex
Essex County	Virginia	The English county of Essex
Essex County	Vermont	Either the English county of Essex, or Essex County, New York (itself named after the English county)
Estill County	Kentucky	James Estill (1750–1782), a military captain killed at the Battle of Little Mountain
Etowah County	Alabama	The Etowah Indian Mounds
Eureka County	Nevada	From the Greek word eureka meaning "I have found it"
Evangeline Parish	Louisiana	Acadian heroine of the poem Evangeline by Henry Wadsworth Longfellow
Evans County	Georgia	Clement A. Evans, a Confederate general who led the last charge of the Army of Northern Virginia at Appomattox

== F ==
County name	State	Name origin
Fairbanks North Star Borough	Alaska	The city of Fairbanks (itself named for Charles W. Fairbanks, U.S. senator from Indiana and later the 26th Vice President of the United States) and Polaris, the North Star
City of Fairfax	Virginia	Thomas Fairfax, 6th Lord Fairfax of Cameron, the proprietor of the Northern Neck (which in colonial times included what is now Northern Virginia)
Fairfax County	Virginia	Thomas Fairfax, 6th Lord Fairfax of Cameron, the proprietor of the Northern Neck (which in colonial times included what is now Northern Virginia)
Fairfield County	Connecticut	The town of Fairfield, Connecticut, which was named after the salt marshes that once bordered the coast
Fairfield County	Ohio	The Fairfield area of the original Lancaster in England
Fairfield County	South Carolina	Probably fanciful, but often attributed to a description by British General Charles Cornwallis
Faleāsao County	American Samoa	named after Faleasao village
Fall River County	South Dakota	Fall River
Fallon County	Montana	Benjamin O'Fallon, a federal Indian agent
Falls County	Texas	Waterfalls on the Brazos River
City of Falls Church	Virginia	The Falls Church, a historic church in the city. The church in turn was named because it was located on what had been the main road to the Great Falls of the Potomac River in colonial times.
Fannin County	Georgia	Colonel James Fannin (1809–1836), hero of the Texas Revolution
Fannin County	Texas	Colonel James Fannin (1809–1836), hero of the Texas Revolution
Faribault County	Minnesota	Jean-Baptiste Faribault (1775–1860), an early settler and fur trader in the region
Faulk County	South Dakota	Andrew Jackson Faulk, 3rd Governor of Dakota Territory (1866–1869)
Faulkner County	Arkansas	Sandford C. Faulkner (1803–1874), a fiddler and composer of the former state song "The Arkansas Traveler"
Fauquier County	Virginia	Francis Fauquier, Lieutenant Governor of the Virginia Colony (1758–1768)
Fayette County	Alabama	From La Fayette, the original spelling for the title used by Gilbert du Motier, Marquis de Lafayette (1757–1834), a French general who played a major role in the Revolutionary War
Fayette County	Georgia	From La Fayette, the original spelling for the title used by Gilbert du Motier, Marquis de Lafayette (1757–1834), a French general who played a major role in the Revolutionary War
Fayette County	Illinois	From La Fayette, the original spelling for the title used by Gilbert du Motier, Marquis de Lafayette (1757–1834), a French general who played a major role in the Revolutionary War
Fayette County	Indiana	From La Fayette, the original spelling for the title used by Gilbert du Motier, Marquis de Lafayette (1757–1834), a French general who played a major role in the Revolutionary War
Fayette County	Iowa	From La Fayette, the original spelling for the title used by Gilbert du Motier, Marquis de Lafayette (1757–1834), a French general who played a major role in the Revolutionary War
Fayette County	Kentucky	From La Fayette, the original spelling for the title used by Gilbert du Motier, Marquis de Lafayette (1757–1834), a French general who played a major role in the Revolutionary War
Fayette County	Ohio	From La Fayette, the original spelling for the title used by Gilbert du Motier, Marquis de Lafayette (1757–1834), a French general who played a major role in the Revolutionary War
Fayette County	Pennsylvania	From La Fayette, the original spelling for the title used by Gilbert du Motier, Marquis de Lafayette (1757–1834), a French general who played a major role in the Revolutionary War
Fayette County	Tennessee	From La Fayette, the original spelling for the title used by Gilbert du Motier, Marquis de Lafayette (1757–1834), a French general who played a major role in the Revolutionary War
Fayette County	Texas	From La Fayette, the original spelling for the title used by Gilbert du Motier, Marquis de Lafayette (1757–1834), a French general who played a major role in the Revolutionary War
Fayette County	West Virginia	From La Fayette, the original spelling for the title used by Gilbert du Motier, Marquis de Lafayette (1757–1834), a French general who played a major role in the Revolutionary War
Fentress County	Tennessee	James Fentress, a Tennessee state legislator
Fergus County	Montana	Father of Andrew Fergus, one of the area's first settlers
Ferry County	Washington	Elisha P. Ferry, first governor of the State of Washington (1889–1893)
Fillmore County	Minnesota	Millard Fillmore, 13th President of the United States (1850–1853)
Fillmore County	Nebraska	Millard Fillmore, 13th President of the United States (1850–1853)
Finney County	Kansas	David Wesley Finney, Lieutenant Governor of Kansas (1881–1885)
Fisher County	Texas	Samuel Rhoads Fisher, a signer of the Texas Declaration of Independence
Flagler County	Florida	Henry Morrison Flagler (1830–1913), founder of the Florida East Coast Railway
Flathead County	Montana	Flathead Nation of Native Americans
Fleming County	Kentucky	John Fleming (1735–1791), an early settler of Kentucky
Florence County	South Carolina	Florence, a daughter of W.W. Harllee, a president of the Wilmington and Manchester Railroad
Florence County	Wisconsin	Originally named for a mining company, which was itself named in honor of Mrs. Florence Hulst, wife of Dr. N.P. Hulst of Milwaukee
Floyd County	Georgia	General John Floyd (1769–1839), Indian fighter and U.S. Representative from Georgia
Floyd County	Indiana	Either one of three people: Colonel John Floyd of Virginia, early settler Davis Floyd (1776–1834), or early settler John Floyd
Floyd County	Iowa	Charles Floyd (1782–1804), a member of the Lewis and Clark Expedition who died in Iowa
Floyd County	Kentucky	John Floyd (1750–1783), surveyor and pioneer
Floyd County	Texas	Dolphin Ward Floyd, who died defending the Alamo during the Texas Revolution
Floyd County	Virginia	John B. Floyd, 31st Governor of Virginia (1849–1852)
Fluvanna County	Virginia	From a name meaning "Anne's River" in honor of Anne, Queen of Great Britain; formerly applied to the James River west of Columbia, Virginia
Foard County	Texas	Robert Levi Foard, an attorney and Civil War soldier
Fond du Lac County	Wisconsin	French for "bottom of the lake" or "foot of the lake"
Ford County	Illinois	Thomas Ford (1800–1850), 8th Governor of Illinois (1842–1846)
Ford County	Kansas	James Hobart Ford, a Union general during the Civil War
Forest County	Pennsylvania	Named for the prevalence of forested land in the area
Forest County	Wisconsin	Named for the prevalence of forested land in the area
Forrest County	Mississippi	Nathan Bedford Forrest, a notorious Confederate General during the Civil War
Forsyth County	Georgia	John Forsyth (1780–1841), Secretary of State under President Martin Van Buren
Forsyth County	North Carolina	Colonel Benjamin Forsyth, who was killed in the War of 1812
Fort Bend County	Texas	Fort Bend, a military blockhouse built at a bend in the Brazos River
Foster County	North Dakota	Either James S. Foster, or his brother George I. Foster
Fountain County	Indiana	An alternate spelling for the surname of James Fontaine, an officer who was killed at the Battle of the Maumee in 1790
Franklin County	Alabama	Benjamin Franklin (1706–1790), one of the Founding Fathers of the United States
Franklin County	Arkansas	Benjamin Franklin (1706–1790), one of the Founding Fathers of the United States
Franklin County	Florida	Benjamin Franklin (1706–1790), one of the Founding Fathers of the United States
Franklin County	Georgia	Benjamin Franklin (1706–1790), one of the Founding Fathers of the United States
Franklin County	Illinois	Benjamin Franklin (1706–1790), one of the Founding Fathers of the United States
Franklin County	Indiana	Benjamin Franklin (1706–1790), one of the Founding Fathers of the United States
Franklin County	Iowa	Benjamin Franklin (1706–1790), one of the Founding Fathers of the United States
Franklin County	Kansas	Benjamin Franklin (1706–1790), one of the Founding Fathers of the United States
Franklin County	Kentucky	Benjamin Franklin (1706–1790), one of the Founding Fathers of the United States
Franklin County	Maine	Benjamin Franklin (1706–1790), one of the Founding Fathers of the United States
Franklin County	Massachusetts	Benjamin Franklin (1706–1790), one of the Founding Fathers of the United States
Franklin County	Mississippi	Benjamin Franklin (1706–1790), one of the Founding Fathers of the United States
Franklin County	Missouri	Benjamin Franklin (1706–1790), one of the Founding Fathers of the United States
Franklin County	Nebraska	Benjamin Franklin (1706–1790), one of the Founding Fathers of the United States
Franklin County	New York	Benjamin Franklin (1706–1790), one of the Founding Fathers of the United States
Franklin County	North Carolina	Benjamin Franklin (1706–1790), one of the Founding Fathers of the United States
Franklin County	Ohio	Benjamin Franklin (1706–1790), one of the Founding Fathers of the United States
Franklin County	Pennsylvania	Benjamin Franklin (1706–1790), one of the Founding Fathers of the United States
Franklin County	Tennessee	Benjamin Franklin (1706–1790), one of the Founding Fathers of the United States
Franklin County	Vermont	Benjamin Franklin (1706–1790), one of the Founding Fathers of the United States
City of Franklin	Virginia	Benjamin Franklin (1706–1790), one of the Founding Fathers of the United States
Franklin County	Virginia	Benjamin Franklin (1706–1790), one of the Founding Fathers of the United States
Franklin County	Washington	Benjamin Franklin (1706–1790), one of the Founding Fathers of the United States
Franklin Parish	Louisiana	Benjamin Franklin (1706–1790), one of the Founding Fathers of the United States
Franklin County	Idaho	Franklin D. Richards (1821–1899), an early apostle of the LDS Church
Franklin County	Texas	Generally believed to have been named after Judge Benjamin C. Franklin, the first appointed justice in the Republic of Texas
Frederick County	Maryland	Frederick Calvert, 6th Baron Baltimore, the final proprietor of the Maryland colony
Frederick County	Virginia	Prince Frederick Lewis of Wales, the eldest son of King George II of Great Britain
City of Fredericksburg	Virginia	Frederick, Prince of Wales (1707–1751)
Freeborn County	Minnesota	William S. Freeborn (1816–1900), a member of the Territorial Legislature
Freestone County	Texas	Named because water in the area was found to be free of minerals
Fremont County	Colorado	John C. Frémont, an explorer of the American West, officer during the Mexican–American War, and presidential candidate in 1856
Fremont County	Idaho	John C. Frémont, an explorer of the American West, officer during the Mexican–American War, and presidential candidate in 1856
Fremont County	Iowa	John C. Frémont, an explorer of the American West, officer during the Mexican–American War, and presidential candidate in 1856
Fremont County	Wyoming	John C. Frémont, an explorer of the American West, officer during the Mexican–American War, and presidential candidate in 1856
Fresno County	California	Fresno Creek, ultimately from the Spanish word fresno, meaning "ash tree"
Frio County	Texas	The Frio River, ultimately from the Spanish word frio, meaning "cold"
Frontier County	Nebraska	Location on the American frontier
Fulton County	Arkansas	William S. Fulton (1795–1844), the last governor of the Arkansas Territory prior to statehood
Fulton County	Georgia	Either Robert Fulton, inventor of the first commercially successful steamboat, or Hamilton Fulton, Chief Engineer of the State of Georgia in 1853
Fulton County	Illinois	Robert Fulton, inventor of the first commercially successful steamboat
Fulton County	Indiana	Robert Fulton, inventor of the first commercially successful steamboat
Fulton County	Kentucky	Robert Fulton, inventor of the first commercially successful steamboat
Fulton County	New York	Robert Fulton, inventor of the first commercially successful steamboat
Fulton County	Ohio	Robert Fulton, inventor of the first commercially successful steamboat
Fulton County	Pennsylvania	Robert Fulton, inventor of the first commercially successful steamboat
Furnas County	Nebraska	Robert W. Furnas, 7th Governor of Nebraska (1873–1875)

== G ==
County name	State	Name origin
Gadsden County	Florida	James Gadsden (1788–1858), American diplomat and namesake of the Gadsden Purchase
Gage County	Nebraska	Reverend W.D. Gage, who served as the chaplain of the first territorial legislature
Gaines County	Texas	James Gaines, merchant who signed the Texas Declaration of Independence
City of Galax	Virginia	Named for Galax, a flowering plant
Gallatin County	Illinois	Albert Gallatin (1761–1849), fourth and longest-serving United States Secretary of the Treasury
Gallatin County	Kentucky	Albert Gallatin (1761–1849), fourth and longest-serving United States Secretary of the Treasury
Gallatin County	Montana	Albert Gallatin (1761–1849), fourth and longest-serving United States Secretary of the Treasury
Gallia County	Ohio	Latin name for France, owing to the large population of French settlers in the area
Galveston County	Texas	Bernardo de Gálvez, 5th Governor of Spanish Louisiana (1777–1783)
Garden County	Nebraska	Named in the hope that it would become "the Garden of the West"
Garfield County	Colorado	James A. Garfield, 20th President of the United States (1881)
Garfield County	Montana	James A. Garfield, 20th President of the United States (1881)
Garfield County	Nebraska	James A. Garfield, 20th President of the United States (1881)
Garfield County	Oklahoma	James A. Garfield, 20th President of the United States (1881)
Garfield County	Utah	James A. Garfield, 20th President of the United States (1881)
Garfield County	Washington	James A. Garfield, 20th President of the United States (1881)
Garland County	Arkansas	Augustus Hill Garland (1832–1899), U.S. senator and 11th Governor of Arkansas
Garrard County	Kentucky	James Garrard, 2nd Governor of Kentucky (1796–1804)
Garrett County	Maryland	John W. Garrett, president of the Baltimore and Ohio Railroad
Garvin County	Oklahoma	Samuel Garvin, a citizen of the Chickasaw Nation
Garza County	Texas	Name of a resident pioneer family
Gasconade County	Missouri	The Gasconade River, a tributary of the Missouri River which probably derives its name from the French word gascon, meaning "braggart", and could be an old satirical name describing those who boast about their adventures upon returning to St. Louis. Gascony is also a region of southwestern France.
Gaston County	North Carolina	William Gaston, a member of Congress and a Justice of the Supreme Court of North Carolina
Gates County	North Carolina	General Horatio Gates, who commanded the Continental Army at the Battle of Saratoga
Geary County	Kansas	John W. Geary, a Union general during the Civil War
Geauga County	Ohio	From the Onondaga or Seneca word sheauga, meaning "raccoon"
Gem County	Idaho	Named for Idaho's state nickname, the "Gem State"
Genesee County	Michigan	From the Seneca word je-nis-hi-yeh, meaning "beautiful valley", which originally referred to a valley in western New York
Genesee County	New York	From the Seneca word je-nis-hi-yeh, meaning "beautiful valley", which originally referred to a valley in western New York
Geneva County	Alabama	Named for the county seat, Geneva, Alabama, itself named after the city of Geneva, New York
Gentry County	Missouri	Richard Gentry (1788–1837), a military colonel who was the founder and first mayor of Columbia, Missouri
George County	Mississippi	James Z. George, a Confederate colonel and Mississippi jurist
Georgetown County	South Carolina	Named for the town of Georgetown, South Carolina, itself named for Prince George, who became King George II of Great Britain
Gibson County	Indiana	John Gibson (1740–1822), a veteran of numerous early American wars and a secretary of the Indiana Territory
Gibson County	Tennessee	John H. Gibson, a soldier of the Natchez Expedition and the Creek War
Gila County	Arizona	The Gila River, whose name comes from a Pima word
Gilchrist County	Florida	Albert W. Gilchrist (1858–1926), 20th Governor of Florida
Giles County	Tennessee	William Branch Giles, 24th Governor of Virginia (1827–1830)
Giles County	Virginia	William Branch Giles, 24th Governor of Virginia (1827–1830)
Gillespie County	Texas	Robert Addison Gillespie (1815–1846), a Texas Ranger, Indian fighter, merchant and soldier
Gilliam County	Oregon	Cornelius Gilliam, who commanded the forces of the provisional government of Oregon after the Whitman massacre in 1847
Gilmer County	Georgia	George Rockingham Gilmer (1780–1859), 16th Governor of Georgia
Gilmer County	West Virginia	Thomas Walker Gilmer, 28th Governor of Virginia (1840–1841)
Gilpin County	Colorado	William Gilpin, first Territorial Governor of Colorado (1861–1862)
Glacier County	Montana	Glacier National Park, which borders the county and was itself named for the many glaciers on its mountain peaks
Glades County	Florida	Florida Everglades
Gladwin County	Michigan	Major Henry Gladwin, British commander of Fort Detroit during the siege by Pontiac in 1763–1764
Glascock County	Georgia	General Thomas Glascock (1790–1841), hero of the War of 1812 and the Seminole War of 1817 and a U.S. Representative from Georgia
Glasscock County	Texas	George Washington Glasscock (1810–1868), an early settler of Texas
Glenn County	California	Dr. Hugh J. Glenn (1824–1883), a California businessman and politician
Gloucester County	New Jersey	Either the English county of Gloucester, or Henry, Duke of Gloucester, brother of Charles II of England
Gloucester County	Virginia	The English county of Gloucester
Glynn County	Georgia	John Glynn (1722–1779), a British Member of Parliament and Serjeant-at-law who was sympathetic to the cause of American independence
Gogebic County	Michigan	Probably from the Chippewa bic, which most references interpret as "rock"
Golden Valley County	Montana	Probably named in a promotional attempt to lure settlers to the area
Golden Valley County	North Dakota	Named because surveyors noticed that the sunlight gave the surrounding grasses a distinct golden color
Goliad County	Texas	The Mexican municipality of Goliad, which in turn is named for Father Miguel Hidalgo y Costilla, a revolutionary leader during the Mexican War of Independence. "Goliad" is an anagram of Hidalgo, minus the silent "H".
Gonzales County	Texas	Rafael Gonzales, governor of the Mexican state of Coahuila y Tejas
Goochland County	Virginia	Sir William Gooch, the royal lieutenant governor of Virginia
Goodhue County	Minnesota	James Madison Goodhue, the first newspaper editor in Minnesota
Gooding County	Idaho	Frank R. Gooding (1859–1928), seventh Governor of Idaho (1905–1909) and a U.S. senator (1921–1928)
Gordon County	Georgia	William Washington Gordon (1796–1842), first president of the Central of Georgia Railway
Goshen County	Wyoming	Goshen Hole, a valley in the southwest part of the county. The origin of that name is obscure, but is probably associated with the biblical place of the same name in Egypt.
Gosper County	Nebraska	John J. Gosper, a Secretary of State of Nebraska
Gove County	Kansas	Grenville L. Gove
Grady County	Georgia	Henry W. Grady (1850–1889), famous orator and managing editor of the Atlanta Constitution
Grady County	Oklahoma	Henry W. Grady (1850–1889), famous orator and managing editor of the Atlanta Constitution
Grafton County	New Hampshire	Augustus FitzRoy, 3rd Duke of Grafton, who was the British Prime Minister in 1769, the year the county was established
Graham County	Arizona	Mount Graham, located in the Pinaleno Mountains, which in turn was named for Lieutenant Colonel James Duncan Graham, a senior officer in the Army Corps of Topographical Engineers
Graham County	Kansas	John L. Graham
Graham County	North Carolina	William Alexander Graham, 30th Governor of North Carolina (1845–1849) and U.S. Secretary of the Navy under President Millard Fillmore
Grainger County	Tennessee	Mary Grainger Blount, wife of William Blount and "first lady" of the Southwest Territory, which later became Tennessee
Grand County	Colorado	The Colorado River, of which a segment above the confluence with the Green River was known as the Grand River prior to 1921. The river's headwaters are located in the eastern part of Grand County, Colorado.
Grand County	Utah	The Colorado River, of which a segment above the confluence with the Green River was known as the Grand River prior to 1921. The river's headwaters are located in the eastern part of Grand County, Colorado.
Grand Forks County	North Dakota	Named for the town at the forks of the Red River of the North and Red Lake River
Grand Isle County	Vermont	Named for the islands in Lake Champlain
Grand Traverse County	Michigan	From the French phrase grande travers, meaning "long crossing". It was given first to Grand Traverse Bay by French voyageurs.
Granite County	Montana	Granite Peak, the highest point in Montana, which also contained a silver mine named "Granite"
Grant County	Arkansas	Ulysses S. Grant, 18th President of the United States (1869–1877)
Grant County	Kansas	Ulysses S. Grant, 18th President of the United States (1869–1877)
Grant Parish	Louisiana	Ulysses S. Grant, 18th President of the United States (1869–1877)
Grant County	Minnesota	Ulysses S. Grant, 18th President of the United States (1869–1877)
Grant County	Nebraska	Ulysses S. Grant, 18th President of the United States (1869–1877)
Grant County	New Mexico	Ulysses S. Grant, 18th President of the United States (1869–1877)
Grant County	North Dakota	Ulysses S. Grant, 18th President of the United States (1869–1877)
Grant County	Oklahoma	Ulysses S. Grant, 18th President of the United States (1869–1877)
Grant County	Oregon	Ulysses S. Grant, 18th President of the United States (1869–1877)
Grant County	South Dakota	Ulysses S. Grant, 18th President of the United States (1869–1877)
Grant County	Washington	Ulysses S. Grant, 18th President of the United States (1869–1877)
Grant County	West Virginia	Ulysses S. Grant, 18th President of the United States (1869–1877)
Grant County	Indiana	Named for Captains Samuel and Moses Grant of Kentucky.
Grant County	Kentucky	Samuel Grant (1762–1789 or 1794), John Grant (1754–1826), and/or Squire Grant (1764–1833), early settlers of Kentucky
Grant County	Wisconsin	Named for the Grant River, which might have been named for James Grant, an early trapper on the river
Granville County	North Carolina	John Carteret, 2nd Earl Granville, heir to one of the eight original Lords Proprietors of the Province of Carolina
Gratiot County	Michigan	Captain Charles Gratiot (1788–1855), who built Fort Gratiot at the present site of Port Huron
Graves County	Kentucky	Benjamin F. Graves (1771–1813), a soldier killed at the Battle of River Raisin
Gray County	Kansas	Alfred Gray, a state legislator and secretary of the State Board of Agriculture
Gray County	Texas	Peter W. Gray, a Confederate lawyer and soldier in the Civil War
Grays Harbor County	Washington	Grays Harbor, which was itself named for Boston fur trader Robert Gray
Grayson County	Kentucky	William Grayson (1740–1790), aide-de-camp to George Washington, delegate to the Continental Congress, and U.S. Senator from Virginia
Grayson County	Virginia	William Grayson (1740–1790), aide-de-camp to George Washington, delegate to the Continental Congress, and U.S. Senator from Virginia
Grayson County	Texas	Peter Wagener Grayson, attorney general of the Republic of Texas
Greeley County	Kansas	Horace Greeley (1811–1872), newspaper editor and politician
Greeley County	Nebraska	Horace Greeley (1811–1872), newspaper editor and politician
Green County	Kentucky	Nathanael Greene (1742–1786), Revolutionary War general
Green County	Wisconsin	Nathanael Greene (1742–1786), Revolutionary War general
Green Lake County	Wisconsin	From the original French name for a large lake in the county, Lac Vert, meaning "green lake"
Greenbrier County	West Virginia	From the original name for the Greenbrier River as given by French explorers, Riviere de la Ronceverte, meaning "River of the Green Briers", a reference to the predominant vegetation along the river
Greene County	Alabama	Nathanael Greene (1742–1786), Revolutionary War general
Greene County	Arkansas	Nathanael Greene (1742–1786), Revolutionary War general
Greene County	Georgia	Nathanael Greene (1742–1786), Revolutionary War general
Greene County	Illinois	Nathanael Greene (1742–1786), Revolutionary War general
Greene County	Indiana	Nathanael Greene (1742–1786), Revolutionary War general
Greene County	Iowa	Nathanael Greene (1742–1786), Revolutionary War general
Greene County	Mississippi	Nathanael Greene (1742–1786), Revolutionary War general
Greene County	Missouri	Nathanael Greene (1742–1786), Revolutionary War general
Greene County	New York	Nathanael Greene (1742–1786), Revolutionary War general
Greene County	North Carolina	Nathanael Greene (1742–1786), Revolutionary War general
Greene County	Ohio	Nathanael Greene (1742–1786), Revolutionary War general
Greene County	Pennsylvania	Nathanael Greene (1742–1786), Revolutionary War general
Greene County	Tennessee	Nathanael Greene (1742–1786), Revolutionary War general
Greene County	Virginia	Nathanael Greene (1742–1786), Revolutionary War general
Greenlee County	Arizona	Mason Greenlee, a pioneer prospector in the area who died in 1903
Greensville County	Virginia	Disputed; possibly for Sir Richard Grenville, leader of the settlement on Roanoke Island, or for Nathanael Greene, a Revolutionary War general
Greenup County	Kentucky	Christopher Greenup, 3rd Governor of Kentucky (1804–1808)
Greenville County	South Carolina	The city of Greenville, itself possibly named for Nathanael Greene, or perhaps for Isaac Green, an early resident
Greenwood County	Kansas	Alfred B. Greenwood, U.S. congressman from Arkansas
Greenwood County	South Carolina	Alfred B. Greenwood, U.S. congressman from Arkansas
Greer County	Oklahoma	John Alexander Greer, 2nd Lieutenant Governor of Texas (1847–1851)
Gregg County	Texas	John Gregg, a Confederate general killed in action during the American Civil War
Gregory County	South Dakota	C.H. Gregory, an officer stationed at Fort Randall
Grenada County	Mississippi	The Spanish Province of Granada (sic)
Griggs County	North Dakota	Alexander Griggs, a steamboat man on the Red River
Grimes County	Texas	Jesse Grimes, a signer of the Texas Declaration of Independence and an early settler of the county
Grundy County	Illinois	Felix Grundy (1777–1840), Tennessee senator that served as the 13th United States Attorney General
Grundy County	Iowa	Felix Grundy (1777–1840), Tennessee senator that served as the 13th United States Attorney General
Grundy County	Missouri	Felix Grundy (1777–1840), Tennessee senator that served as the 13th United States Attorney General
Grundy County	Tennessee	Felix Grundy (1777–1840), Tennessee senator that served as the 13th United States Attorney General
Guadalupe County	New Mexico	Our Lady of Guadalupe from Guadalupe Plain
Guadalupe County	Texas	The Guadalupe River
Guernsey County	Ohio	The Isle of Guernsey in the English Channel, which was the origin of many of Ohio's early settlers
Guilford County	North Carolina	Francis North, 1st Earl of Guilford
Gulf County	Florida	The Gulf of Mexico
Gunnison County	Colorado	John Williams Gunnison, an explorer who surveyed the county during his ill-fated 1853 expedition
Guthrie County	Iowa	Edwin B. Guthrie, an officer in the Mexican–American War
Gwinnett County	Georgia	Button Gwinnett, one of three signers of the Declaration of Independence from Georgia

== H ==
County name	State	Name origin
Haakon County	South Dakota	King Haakon VII of Norway
Habersham County	Georgia	Colonel Joseph Habersham (1751–1815), hero of the Revolutionary War and Postmaster General in the Cabinet of George Washington
Haines Borough	Alaska	The city of Haines, Alaska, which was itself named for Mrs. F. E. Haines
Hale County	Alabama	Stephen F. Hale (1816–1862), a lieutenant colonel in the Confederate States Army
Hale County	Texas	Lieutenant John C. Hale, hero of the Battle of San Jacinto during the Texas Revolution
Halifax County	North Carolina	George Montague-Dunk, 2nd Earl of Halifax
Halifax County	Virginia	George Montague-Dunk, 2nd Earl of Halifax
Hall County	Georgia	Dr. Lyman Hall (1724–1790), one of Georgia's delegates to the Continental Congress who signed the Declaration of Independence. He became Governor of Georgia in 1783.
Hall County	Nebraska	Augustus Hall, Chief Justice of the Territorial Supreme Court
Hall County	Texas	Warren D.C. Hall, Secretary of War for the Republic of Texas
Hamblen County	Tennessee	Hezekiah Hamblen, an early settler
Hamilton County	Florida	Alexander Hamilton (1757–1804), first United States Secretary of the Treasury and one of the Founding Fathers
Hamilton County	Illinois	Alexander Hamilton (1757–1804), first United States Secretary of the Treasury and one of the Founding Fathers
Hamilton County	Indiana	Alexander Hamilton (1757–1804), first United States Secretary of the Treasury and one of the Founding Fathers
Hamilton County	Kansas	Alexander Hamilton (1757–1804), first United States Secretary of the Treasury and one of the Founding Fathers
Hamilton County	Nebraska	Alexander Hamilton (1757–1804), first United States Secretary of the Treasury and one of the Founding Fathers
Hamilton County	New York	Alexander Hamilton (1757–1804), first United States Secretary of the Treasury and one of the Founding Fathers
Hamilton County	Ohio	Alexander Hamilton (1757–1804), first United States Secretary of the Treasury and one of the Founding Fathers
Hamilton County	Tennessee	Alexander Hamilton (1757–1804), first United States Secretary of the Treasury and one of the Founding Fathers
Hamilton County	Iowa	William W. Hamilton, President of the Iowa Senate (1856–1857)
Hamilton County	Texas	James Hamilton Jr., 53rd Governor of South Carolina (1830–1832), who gave financial aid to the Republic of Texas
Hamlin County	South Dakota	Hannibal Hamlin, 15th Vice President of the United States (1861–1865)
Hampden County	Massachusetts	Possibly for John Hampden (1595–1643), a famous 17th-century English parliamentarian
Hampshire County	Massachusetts	The English county of Hampshire
Hampshire County	West Virginia	The English county of Hampshire
City of Hampton	Virginia	Henry Wriothesley, 3rd Earl of Southampton (1573–1624)
Hampton County	South Carolina	Wade Hampton, 77th Governor of South Carolina (1876–1879)
Hancock County	Georgia	John Hancock (1737–1793), president of the Continental Congress and the first signer of the Declaration of Independence
Hancock County	Illinois	John Hancock (1737–1793), president of the Continental Congress and the first signer of the Declaration of Independence
Hancock County	Indiana	John Hancock (1737–1793), president of the Continental Congress and the first signer of the Declaration of Independence
Hancock County	Iowa	John Hancock (1737–1793), president of the Continental Congress and the first signer of the Declaration of Independence
Hancock County	Kentucky	John Hancock (1737–1793), president of the Continental Congress and the first signer of the Declaration of Independence
Hancock County	Maine	John Hancock (1737–1793), president of the Continental Congress and the first signer of the Declaration of Independence
Hancock County	Mississippi	John Hancock (1737–1793), president of the Continental Congress and the first signer of the Declaration of Independence
Hancock County	Ohio	John Hancock (1737–1793), president of the Continental Congress and the first signer of the Declaration of Independence
Hancock County	Tennessee	John Hancock (1737–1793), president of the Continental Congress and the first signer of the Declaration of Independence
Hancock County	West Virginia	John Hancock (1737–1793), president of the Continental Congress and the first signer of the Declaration of Independence
Hand County	South Dakota	George H. Hand, an early settler from Akron, Ohio
Hanover County	Virginia	Named for the Electorate of Hanover in Germany, because King George I of Great Britain was Elector of Hanover at the time.
Hansford County	Texas	John M. Hansford, a Texas state congressman and judge
Hanson County	South Dakota	Joseph R. Hanson of Yankton
Haralson County	Georgia	General Hugh A. Haralson (1805–1854), U.S. Congressman
Hardee County	Florida	Cary A. Hardee (1876–1957), Governor of Florida at the time of the county's creation
Hardeman County	Tennessee	Thomas Jones Hardeman, a soldier during the Creek War and War of 1812, and later a member of the Republic of Texas legislature
Hardeman County	Texas	Bailey Hardeman and Thomas Jones Hardeman, two early Texas politicians and legislators
Hardin County	Illinois	Hardin County, Kentucky
Hardin County	Iowa	John J. Hardin (1810–1847), a prominent soldier in the Black Hawk War
Hardin County	Kentucky	John Hardin (1753–1792), pioneer
Hardin County	Ohio	John Hardin (1753–1792), pioneer
Hardin County	Tennessee	Joseph Hardin, a legislator of the Southwest Territory and the State of Franklin
Hardin County	Texas	The Hardin family, settlers of nearby Liberty County
Harding County	New Mexico	Warren G. Harding, 29th President of the United States (1921–1923), who was inaugurated the same day the county was established
Harding County	South Dakota	J.A. Harding, Speaker of the House of the Dakota Territory
Hardy County	West Virginia	Samuel Hardy, a distinguished Virginian
Harford County	Maryland	Henry Harford, the illegitimate son of Frederick Calvert, 6th Baron Baltimore
Harlan County	Kentucky	Silas Harlan (1753–1782), a soldier in the Battle of Blue Licks
Harlan County	Nebraska	Disputed, but probably James Harlan, U.S. Secretary of the Interior
Harmon County	Oklahoma	Judson Harmon, 45th Governor of Ohio (1909–1913)
Harnett County	North Carolina	Cornelius Harnett, a Revolutionary War soldier who was also a delegate to the Continental Congress
Harney County	Oregon	Brigadier General William S. Harney
Harper County	Kansas	Sergeant Marion Harper, a Kansas soldier who died in the Civil War
Harper County	Oklahoma	Oscar Greene Harper, a local pioneer resident, teacher, and clerk of the Oklahoma Constitutional Convention
Harris County	Georgia	Charles Harris (1772–1827), a prominent Savannah attorney
Harris County	Texas	Originally named Harrisburg County after the City of Harrisburg (now part of Houston), which was founded by John Richardson Harris in the late 1820s.
Harrison County	Indiana	William Henry Harrison, first governor of the Indiana Territory and 9th president of the United States (1841)
Harrison County	Iowa	William Henry Harrison, first governor of the Indiana Territory and 9th president of the United States (1841)
Harrison County	Mississippi	William Henry Harrison, first governor of the Indiana Territory and 9th president of the United States (1841)
Harrison County	Ohio	William Henry Harrison, first governor of the Indiana Territory and 9th president of the United States (1841)
Harrison County	Kentucky	Benjamin Harrison, co-author of the Kentucky Constitution and the 5th Governor of Virginia (1781–1784)
Harrison County	West Virginia	Benjamin Harrison, co-author of the Kentucky Constitution and the 5th Governor of Virginia (1781–1784)
Harrison County	Missouri	Albert Galliton Harrison (1800–1839), U.S. Representative from Missouri
Harrison County	Texas	Jonas Harrison, a lawyer and Texas revolutionary
City of Harrisonburg	Virginia	Thomas Harrison, an 18th-century settler who was the city's founder
Hart County	Georgia	Nancy Morgan Hart (1735–1830), heroine of the Revolutionary War
Hart County	Kentucky	Nathaniel G.S. Hart (1784–1813), a lawyer captured and killed at the Battle of River Raisin
Hartford County	Connecticut	The city of Hartford, Connecticut, the county seat and capital of Connecticut, which was itself named after the county of Hertfordshire in England
Hartley County	Texas	Oliver C. Hartley and his brother, Rufus K. Hartley, two early Texas legislators
Harvey County	Kansas	James M. Harvey, U.S. Senator and 5th Governor of Kansas (1869–1873)
Haskell County	Kansas	Dudley C. Haskell, state legislator and U.S. Congressman
Haskell County	Oklahoma	Charles N. Haskell, first Governor of Oklahoma (1907–1911)
Haskell County	Texas	Charles Ready Haskell, who was killed in the Goliad massacre
Hawaii County	Hawaii	The island of Hawaii, whose name derives from the Hawaiian language word meaning "homeland"
Hawkins County	Tennessee	U.S. Senator Benjamin Hawkins (1754–1816)
Hayes County	Nebraska	Rutherford B. Hayes, 19th President of the United States (1877–1881)
Hays County	Texas	John Coffee Hays, a Texas Ranger and an officer during the Mexican–American War
Haywood County	North Carolina	John Haywood, North Carolina state treasurer
Haywood County	Tennessee	Judge John Haywood (1762–1826), called "the father of Tennessee history"
Heard County	Georgia	Stephen Heard (1740–1815), hero of the Revolutionary War
Hemphill County	Texas	John Hemphill, Chief Justice of the Texas Supreme Court and a U.S. Senator
Hempstead County	Arkansas	Edward Hempstead (1780–1817), a delegate to the U.S. House of Representatives from the Missouri Territory
Henderson County	Illinois	Henderson County, Kentucky
Henderson County	Kentucky	Richard Henderson (1734–1785), founder of the Transylvania colony
Henderson County	North Carolina	Leonard Henderson, Chief Justice of the North Carolina Supreme Court
Henderson County	Tennessee	James Henderson, commander of Tennessee troops preceding the Battle of New Orleans
Henderson County	Texas	James Pinckney Henderson, first attorney general of the Republic of Texas
Hendricks County	Indiana	William Hendricks, 3rd Governor of Indiana (1822–1825)
Hendry County	Florida	Francis A. Hendry (1833–1917), an early Floridian pioneer and politician
Hennepin County	Minnesota	Father Louis Hennepin (1626–1705), an early explorer of the Twin Cities area
Henrico County	Virginia	Named for the townsite of the short-lived settlement of Henricus, which was itself named for Prince Harri, the eldest son of King James I of England
Henry County	Alabama	Patrick Henry, Revolutionary War patriot and first post-colonial Governor of Virginia (1776–1779)
Henry County	Georgia	Patrick Henry, Revolutionary War patriot and first post-colonial Governor of Virginia (1776–1779)
Henry County	Illinois	Patrick Henry, Revolutionary War patriot and first post-colonial Governor of Virginia (1776–1779)
Henry County	Indiana	Patrick Henry, Revolutionary War patriot and first post-colonial Governor of Virginia (1776–1779)
Henry County	Kentucky	Patrick Henry, Revolutionary War patriot and first post-colonial Governor of Virginia (1776–1779)
Henry County	Missouri	Patrick Henry, Revolutionary War patriot and first post-colonial Governor of Virginia (1776–1779)
Henry County	Ohio	Patrick Henry, Revolutionary War patriot and first post-colonial Governor of Virginia (1776–1779)
Henry County	Tennessee	Patrick Henry, Revolutionary War patriot and first post-colonial Governor of Virginia (1776–1779)
Henry County	Virginia	Patrick Henry, Revolutionary War patriot and first post-colonial Governor of Virginia (1776–1779)
Henry County	Iowa	Either Henry Dodge (1782–1867), Governor of the Wisconsin Territory, or James Dougherty Henry, a general in the Black Hawk War
Herkimer County	New York	General Nicholas Herkimer, who died in battle during the Revolutionary War
Hernando County	Florida	Hernando de Soto (c. 1496/1497 – 1542), a Spanish explorer and conquistador
Hertford County	North Carolina	Francis Seymour-Conway, 1st Earl of Hertford
Hettinger County	North Dakota	Mathias Hettinger, the father-in-law of Tom Hettinger, who was Speaker of the Dakota Territory House of Representatives the year Hettinger (Adams County) was established
Hickman County	Kentucky	Paschal Hickman, a military captain killed at the Battle of River Raisin
Hickman County	Tennessee	Edwin Hickman, a longhunter killed by Native Americans near present-day Centerville, Tennessee
Hickory County	Missouri	Andrew Jackson, 7th President of the United States (1829–1837), who was nicknamed "Old Hickory" because of his toughness
Hidalgo County	New Mexico	Father Miguel Hidalgo y Costilla, the priest who raised the call for Mexico's independence from Spain in 1810
Hidalgo County	Texas	Father Miguel Hidalgo y Costilla, the priest who raised the call for Mexico's independence from Spain in 1810
Highland County	Ohio	Named for the hilly topography which divides the Little Miami and Scioto river watersheds
Highland County	Virginia	Named for its high elevation, the highest county in Virginia
Highlands County	Florida	Named for the county's hilly terrain
Hill County	Montana	James Jerome Hill, a leading railroad executive
Hill County	Texas	George Washington Hill, a Secretary of War and Secretary of the Navy for the Republic of Texas
Hillsborough County	Florida	Wills Hill, 1st Marquess of Downshire (1718–1793), Secretary of State for the Colonies
Hillsborough County	New Hampshire	Wills Hill, the Viscount Hillsborough, who was British Secretary of State for the Colonies at the time
Hillsdale County	Michigan	Named for its terrain of hills and dales
Hinds County	Mississippi	Thomas Hinds, a U.S. Congressman
Hinsdale County	Colorado	George A. Hinsdale, a lawyer who was named lieutenant governor when Colorado first applied for statehood (1864–1865). President Andrew Johnson rejected the application and Colorado did not become a state until 1876.
Hitchcock County	Nebraska	Phineas Warren Hitchcock, U.S. Senator from Nebraska
Hocking County	Ohio	Reputedly a Delaware Indian word meaning "bottle river"
Hockley County	Texas	George Washington Hockley, a Secretary of War of the Republic of Texas
Hodgeman County	Kansas	Captain Amos Hodgman (sic), wounded in the Civil War
Hoke County	North Carolina	Robert F. Hoke, a Confederate general
Holmes County	Florida	Holmes Creek, which forms the eastern boundary of the county
Holmes County	Mississippi	David Holmes, two-time Governor of Mississippi
Holmes County	Ohio	Major Andrew Hunter Holmes, who died in the Battle of Mackinac Island (1814)
Holt County	Missouri	David Rice Holt, a state legislator
Holt County	Nebraska	Joseph Holt, a U.S. Postmaster General and Secretary of War
Honolulu County	Hawaii	A Hawaiian language word meaning "sheltered bay" or "place of shelter"
Hood County	Texas	John Bell Hood, a Confederate lieutenant general
Hood River County	Oregon	Samuel Hood, 1st Viscount Hood, whose name was given to Mount Hood by the first explorer to see it, William Robert Broughton
Hooker County	Nebraska	Joseph Hooker, a Union general in the Civil War
Hoonah–Angoon Census Area	Alaska	Named for the cities of Hoonah and Angoon; names respectively from the Tlingit Xunaa, which means “lee of the north wind" and Aangóon, "isthmus town."
City of Hopewell	Virginia	Hopewell Friends Meeting House (Frederick County, Virginia)
Hopkins County	Kentucky	Samuel Hopkins (1753–1819), a Revolutionary War general and U.S. Congressman
Hopkins County	Texas	Named for the family of David Hopkins, an early settler in the area
Horry County	South Carolina	Colonel Peter Horry of the South Carolina militia during the Revolutionary War
Hot Spring County	Arkansas	Naturally occurring hot springs within the county
Hot Springs County	Wyoming	Naturally occurring hot springs located in the county seat of Thermopolis
Houghton County	Michigan	Dr. Douglass Houghton (1809–1845), first state geologist of Michigan, physician and surgeon, and Mayor of Detroit (1842–1843)
Houston County	Alabama	George S. Houston (1811–1879), 24th Governor of Alabama and a U.S. Congressman
Houston County	Georgia	John Houstoun (1744–1796), a member of the Continental Congress who served twice as the Governor of Georgia
Houston County	Minnesota	Sam Houston (1793–1863), 2nd and 4th President of the Republic of Texas, U.S. Senator, and 7th Governor of Texas
Houston County	Tennessee	Sam Houston (1793–1863), 2nd and 4th President of the Republic of Texas, U.S. Senator, and 7th Governor of Texas
Houston County	Texas	Sam Houston (1793–1863), 2nd and 4th President of the Republic of Texas, U.S. Senator, and 7th Governor of Texas
Howard County	Arkansas	James H. Howard, Arkansas state senator
Howard County	Indiana	Tilghman Howard (1797–1844), Congressman from Indiana
Howard County	Iowa	Tilghman Howard (1797–1844), Congressman from Indiana
Howard County	Maryland	John Eager Howard, a Revolutionary War officer and the 5th Governor of Maryland (1788–1791)
Howard County	Missouri	Benjamin Howard (1760–1814), a Congressman from Kentucky, the first governor of the Missouri Territory and a brigadier general during the War of 1812
Howard County	Nebraska	Oliver Otis Howard, a Union general in the Civil War
Howard County	Texas	Volney E. Howard, U.S. Congressman from Texas
Howell County	Missouri	Disputed; either pioneer James Howell or politician Thomas J. Howell
Hubbard County	Minnesota	Lucius Frederick Hubbard (1836–1913), 9th Governor of Minnesota (1882–1887)
Hudson County	New Jersey	The Hudson River, which was itself named for 17th-century English explorer Henry Hudson
Hudspeth County	Texas	Claude Benton Hudspeth (1877–1941), a state legislator and U.S. Representative from Texas
Huerfano County	Colorado	The Huerfano River, which in turn was named for an isolated landmark known as Huerfano Bluff (huerfano is Spanish for "orphan")
Hughes County	Oklahoma	William C. Hughes, a delegate to the Oklahoma Constitutional Convention
Hughes County	South Dakota	Alexander Hughes, a state legislator
Humboldt County	California	Humboldt Bay, which in turn was named for German naturalist and explorer Alexander von Humboldt (1769–1859)
Humboldt County	Iowa	Alexander von Humboldt (1769–1859), German naturalist and explorer
Humboldt County	Nevada	Alexander von Humboldt (1769–1859), German naturalist and explorer
Humphreys County	Mississippi	Benjamin G. Humphreys, a Confederate general and the 26th Governor of Mississippi (1865–1868)
Humphreys County	Tennessee	Parry Wayne Humphreys (1778–1839), U.S. Representative from Tennessee
Hunt County	Texas	Memucan Hunt, Jr., first Republic of Texas Minister to the United States
Hunterdon County	New Jersey	Robert Hunter, a colonial governor of New Jersey, through a corruption of Hunterston, his former home in England
Huntingdon County	Pennsylvania	Countess Selina Hastings of Huntingdon
Huntington County	Indiana	Samuel Huntington, President of the Continental Congress
Huron County	Michigan	From Lake Huron, which was itself named Lac des Hurons by the French for the Native American tribe they called hure, meaning "head", a reference to the fantastic way they dressed their hair
Huron County	Ohio	Huron Indians (Wyandot)
Hutchinson County	South Dakota	John Hutchinson, a territorial secretary
Hutchinson County	Texas	Andrew Hutchinson, an early attorney in Texas
Hyde County	North Carolina	Edward Hyde, first Governor of North Carolina (1712) and a grandson of the Earl of Clarendon
Hyde County	South Dakota	James Hyde, a territorial legislator

== I ==
County name	State	Origin
Iberia Parish	Louisiana	Iberian Peninsula, Europe (made up of Spain, Portugal, Gibraltar and Andorra)
Iberville Parish	Louisiana	Pierre Le Moyne d'Iberville, who founded the French colony of Louisiana
Ida County	Iowa	Probably named after Ida Smith, the first child of European immigrants to be born in the region
Idaho County	Idaho	A steamer called Idaho that was launched on the Columbia River in 1860
Imperial County	California	The Imperial Land Company, a subsidiary of the California Development Company
Independence County	Arkansas	Named to honor the Declaration of Independence
Indian River County	Florida	The Indian River Lagoon
Indiana County	Pennsylvania	Probably named for the Indiana Territory
Ingham County	Michigan	Samuel D. Ingham, Secretary of the Treasury under President Andrew Jackson
Inyo County	California	The meaning of the word inyo is "dwelling place of the great spirit" in the Mono language
Ionia County	Michigan	Ionia, a region of the Ancient Greek civilization (part of modern Turkey)
Iosco County	Michigan	A pseudo-Native American name created by Henry Schoolcraft, meaning "water of light"
Iowa County	Iowa	The Iowa River, which flows through the county
Iowa County	Wisconsin	The Iowa people (Báxoje)
Iredell County	North Carolina	James Iredell, one of the first Justices of the Supreme Court of the United States
Irion County	Texas	Robert Anderson Irion, a Secretary of State of the Republic of Texas
Iron County	Michigan	Named for the abundance of iron ore found in the area
Iron County	Missouri	Named for the abundance of iron ore found in the area
Iron County	Wisconsin	Named for the abundance of iron ore found in the area
Iron County	Utah	Named for the iron mines west of Cedar City
Iroquois County	Illinois	The Iroquois people
Irwin County	Georgia	Jared Irwin (1751–1818), two-time governor of Georgia who rescinded the Yazoo Act in 1796
Isabella County	Michigan	Queen Isabella I of Castile
Isanti County	Minnesota	Named for the Santee Sioux (Izatys) people, meaning "[those that] dwell at Knife Lake"
Island County	Washington	The name reflects the fact that the county consists of two large islands, Whidbey and Camano, and seven smaller islands (Baby, Ben Ure, Deception, Kalamut, Minor, Smith, and Strawberry)
Isle of Wight County	Virginia	The Isle of Wight, an island off the south coast of England
Issaquena County	Mississippi	Choctaw isi okhina, "deer river"
Itasca County	Minnesota	Lake Itasca, the source of the Mississippi River. The name was coined by Henry Schoolcraft from a combination of the Latin words veritas ("truth") and caput ("head").
Itawamba County	Mississippi	Levi Colbert, a Chickasaw leader who was also known as Itawamba
Izard County	Arkansas	George Izard, a general during the War of 1812 and the 2nd Governor of the Arkansas Territory (1825–1828)

== See also ==
- Lists of U.S. county name etymologies for links to the remainder of the list
