= Root River (Wisconsin) =

River in Wisconsin, United States

Coordinates: 42.7335°N 87.7785°W

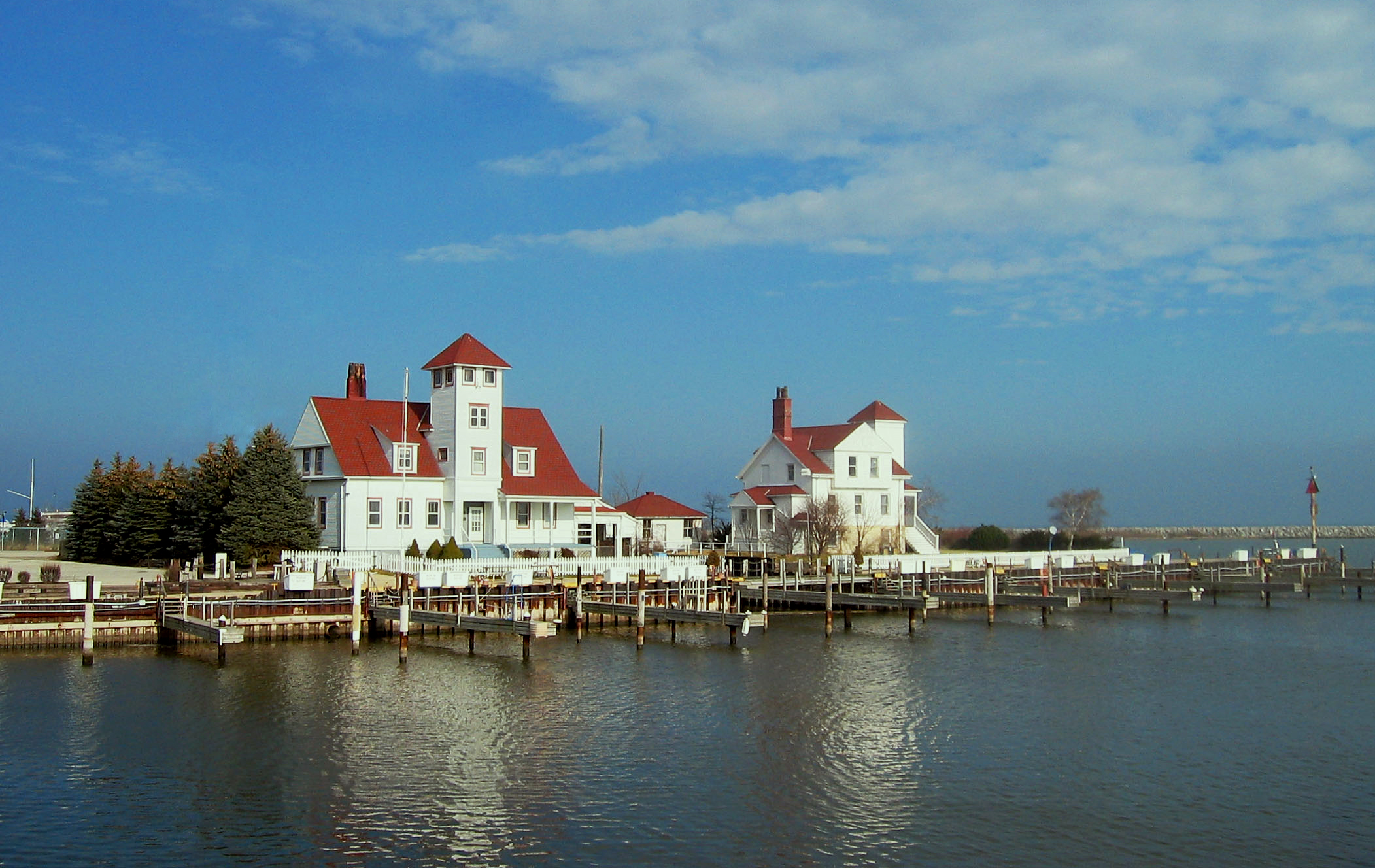
The mouth of the Root River, Racine, Wisconsin

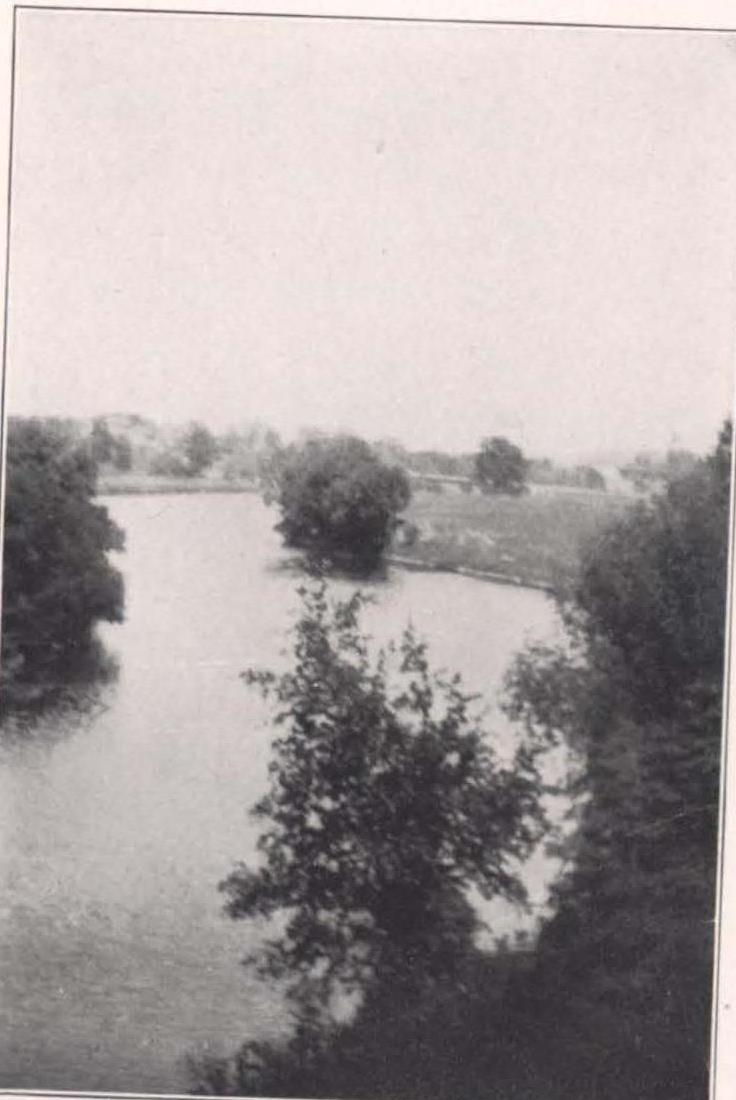
Root River, Racine in early 20th century

The Root River is a 43.7-mile-long (70.3 km) river that flows to Lake Michigan at the city of Racine in southeastern Wisconsin in the United States. Racine and Racine County are named for the river, as racine is the French word for root.

== Course ==
The Root River rises in the Waukesha County suburb of New Berlin and flows generally southeastwardly through the Milwaukee County suburbs of West Allis, Greenfield, Greendale and Franklin, into Racine County, where it enters Lake Michigan at Racine.

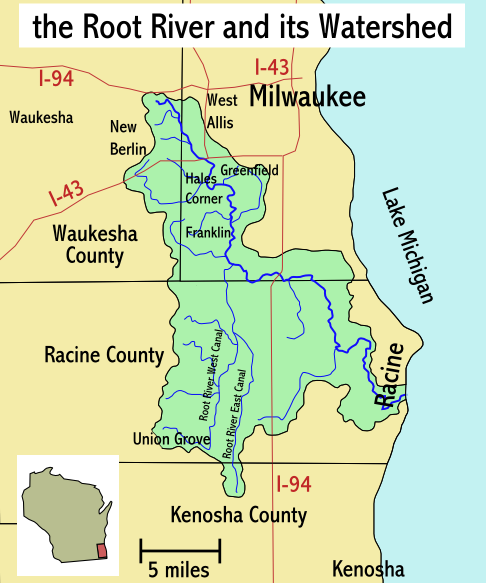
Root River and its watershed

== Variant names ==
According to the Geographic Names Information System, the Root River has also been known historically as:

- Chippecotton
- Chipperooton
- Kipikawi
- Ot-chee-beek
- Racine River

There was at one time a hamlet in Greenfield called Root Creek on the bank of what was locally called "Root Creek" rather than "Root River".

== See also ==
- List of Wisconsin rivers
- List of Wisconsin county name etymologies
- List of U.S. counties named after rivers
