= List of U.S. counties named after presidents of the United States =

A total of 24 presidents have U.S. counties or county equivalents named after them.

== County overview ==
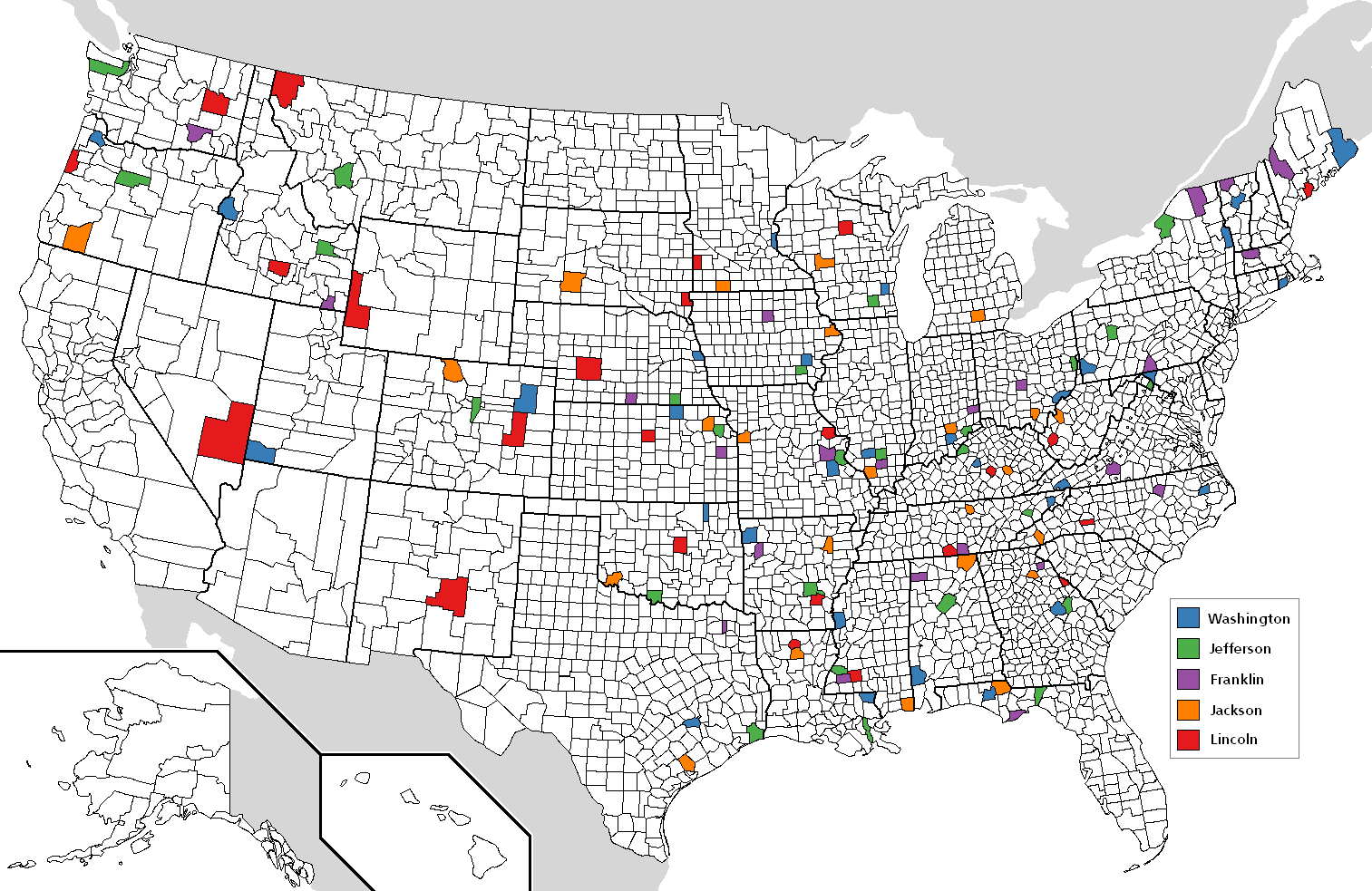
Location of counties named for presidents George Washington, Thomas Jefferson, Andrew Jackson, and Abraham Lincoln, as well as for Benjamin Franklin.

In the United States, a county is an administrative or political subdivision of a U.S. state that consists of a geographic region with specific boundaries and usually some level of governmental authority. Most counties have subdivisions which may include townships, municipalities, and unincorporated areas. Some counties are consolidated city-counties which are simultaneously municipalities and counties.

48 of the 50 U.S. states are subdivided into counties, while the remaining two states and four of the five inhabited territories are subdivided into county equivalents by the state, territory, or the United States Census Bureau. (Note: The Census Bureau does not subdivide the territory of Guam, the federal district of Washington, D.C., or each of the United States Minor Outlying Islands into county equivalents, although Washington, D.C. has wards and Guam has villages.) Louisiana is subdivided into parishes, Alaska is subdivided into boroughs, (Note: One subdivision of Alaska, known as the Unorganized Borough, is further subdivided into eleven census areas, which the Census Bureau treats as county equivalents for statistical purposes.) and the territories use various other types of subdivisions. Some states also have independent cities, which the United States Census Bureau treats as county equivalents.

== Counties named for George Washington ==
30 counties and one parish in the United States are named after George Washington (1732–1799), the first president of the United States.

- Washington County, Alabama
- Washington County, Arkansas
- Washington County, Colorado
- Washington County, Florida
- Washington County, Georgia
- Washington County, Idaho
- Washington County, Illinois
- Washington County, Indiana
- Washington County, Iowa
- Washington County, Kansas
- Washington County, Kentucky
- Washington County, Maine
- Washington County, Maryland
- Washington County, Minnesota
- Washington County, Mississippi
- Washington County, Missouri
- Washington County, Nebraska
- Washington County, New York
- Washington County, North Carolina
- Washington County, Ohio
- Washington County, Oklahoma
- Washington County, Oregon
- Washington County, Pennsylvania
- Washington County, Rhode Island
- Washington County, Tennessee
- Washington County, Texas
- Washington County, Utah
- Washington County, Vermont
- Washington County, Virginia
- Washington County, Wisconsin
- Washington Parish, Louisiana

== Counties named for Thomas Jefferson ==
22 counties and one parish in the United States are named after Thomas Jefferson (1743–1826), the third president of the United States.

- Jefferson County, Alabama
- Jefferson County, Arkansas
- Jefferson County, Florida
- Jefferson County, Georgia
- Jefferson County, Idaho
- Jefferson County, Illinois
- Jefferson County, Indiana
- Jefferson County, Iowa
- Jefferson County, Kansas
- Jefferson County, Kentucky
- Jefferson County, Mississippi
- Jefferson County, Missouri
- Jefferson County, Nebraska
- Jefferson County, New York
- Jefferson County, Ohio
- Jefferson County, Oklahoma
- Jefferson County, Pennsylvania
- Jefferson County, Tennessee
- Jefferson County, Texas
- Jefferson County, Washington
- Jefferson County, West Virginia
- Jefferson County, Wisconsin
- Jefferson Parish, Louisiana

Three counties were indirectly named for Jefferson:

- Jefferson County, Colorado: Jefferson is named after the Territory of Jefferson, which in turn is named after Thomas Jefferson.
- Jefferson County, Montana: Jefferson is named after the Jefferson River, which in turn is named after Thomas Jefferson.
- Jefferson County, Oregon: Jefferson is named after Mount Jefferson on the county's western boundary which in turn is named after Thomas Jefferson.

== Counties named for Andrew Jackson ==
21 counties and one parish in the United States are named after Andrew Jackson (1767–1845), the seventh president of the United States.

- Jackson County, Alabama
- Jackson County, Arkansas
- Jackson County, Colorado
- Jackson County, Florida
- Jackson County, Illinois
- Jackson County, Indiana
- Jackson County, Iowa
- Jackson County, Kansas
- Jackson County, Kentucky
- Jackson County, Michigan
- Jackson County, Mississippi
- Jackson County, Missouri
- Jackson County, North Carolina
- Jackson County, Ohio
- Jackson County, Oregon
- Jackson County, South Dakota
- Jackson County, Tennessee
- Jackson County, Texas
- Jackson County, West Virginia
- Jackson County, Wisconsin
- Jackson Parish, Louisiana
- Hickory County, Missouri (after Jackson's nickname "Old Hickory")

Three counties named Jackson County are named for individuals other than Andrew Jackson: Jackson County, Georgia is named after James Jackson, the 23rd governor of Georgia. Jackson County, Minnesota is named after Henry Jackson, a member of the first Minnesota Territory legislature. Jackson County, Oklahoma is named after Confederate general Stonewall Jackson.

== Counties named for James Madison ==
18 counties and one parish in the United States are named after James Madison (1751–1836), the fourth president of the United States.

- Madison County, Alabama
- Madison County, Arkansas
- Madison County, Florida
- Madison County, Georgia
- Madison County, Idaho
- Madison County, Illinois
- Madison County, Indiana
- Madison County, Iowa
- Madison County, Kentucky
- Madison County, Mississippi
- Madison County, Missouri
- Madison County, New York
- Madison County, North Carolina
- Madison County, Ohio
- Madison County, Tennessee
- Madison County, Texas
- Madison County, Virginia
- Madison Parish, Louisiana

Two counties were indirectly named for Madison:

- Madison County, Montana is named after the Madison River, which in turn is named for James Madison.
- Madison County, Nebraska is probably named for Madison, Wisconsin, which in turn is named after James Madison, where most of the new county's settlers were from.

== Counties named for Abraham Lincoln ==
16 counties and one parish in the United States are named after Abraham Lincoln (1809–1865), the sixteenth president of the United States.

- Lincoln County, Arkansas
- Lincoln County, Colorado
- Lincoln County, Idaho
- Lincoln County, Kansas
- Lincoln County, Minnesota
- Lincoln County, Mississippi
- Lincoln County, Montana
- Lincoln County, Nebraska
- Lincoln County, Nevada
- Lincoln County, New Mexico
- Lincoln County, Oklahoma
- Lincoln County, Oregon
- Lincoln County, Washington
- Lincoln County, West Virginia
- Lincoln County, Wisconsin
- Lincoln County, Wyoming
- Lincoln Parish, Louisiana

Seven other Lincoln counties exist in the United States; five of these counties are named for Benjamin Lincoln, a general in the American Revolutionary War. Lincoln County, Maine is named after the city of Lincoln, England, and Lincoln County, South Dakota is named after Lincoln County, Maine.

== Counties named for James Monroe ==
17 counties in the United States are named after James Monroe (1758–1831), the fifth president of the United States.

- Monroe County, Alabama
- Monroe County, Arkansas
- Monroe County, Florida
- Monroe County, Georgia
- Monroe County, Illinois
- Monroe County, Indiana
- Monroe County, Iowa
- Monroe County, Kentucky
- Monroe County, Michigan
- Monroe County, Mississippi
- Monroe County, Missouri
- Monroe County, New York
- Monroe County, Ohio
- Monroe County, Pennsylvania
- Monroe County, Tennessee
- Monroe County, West Virginia
- Monroe County, Wisconsin

== Counties named for Ulysses S. Grant ==
11 counties and one parish in the United States are named after Ulysses S. Grant (1822–1885), the eighteenth president of the United States.

- Grant County, Arkansas
- Grant County, Kansas
- Grant County, Minnesota
- Grant County, Nebraska
- Grant County, New Mexico
- Grant County, North Dakota
- Grant County, Oklahoma
- Grant County, Oregon
- Grant County, South Dakota
- Grant County, Washington
- Grant County, West Virginia
- Grant Parish, Louisiana

Three other Grant counties exist in the United States. Grant County, Indiana was named after Captains Samuel and Moses Grant of Kentucky. Grant County, Kentucky was named after Samuel Grant, John Grant, and/or Squire Grant, early settlers of Kentucky. Grant County, Wisconsin was named after an early pioneer who opened a trade with local Native Americans.

== Counties named for James K. Polk ==
At least 10 counties in the United States are named after James K. Polk (1795–1849), the eleventh president of the United States.

- Polk County, Arkansas
- Polk County, Florida
- Polk County, Georgia
- Polk County, Iowa
- Polk County, Minnesota
- Polk County, Nebraska
- Polk County, Oregon
- Polk County, Tennessee
- Polk County, Texas
- Polk County, Wisconsin

Polk County, Missouri is named after Ezekiel Polk, the grandfather of the president and an early settler in the county.

Polk County, North Carolina was named after American Revolutionary War colonel William Polk.

== Counties named for James A. Garfield ==
Six counties in the United States are named after James A. Garfield (1831–1881), the twentieth president of the United States.

- Garfield County, Colorado
- Garfield County, Montana
- Garfield County, Nebraska
- Garfield County, Oklahoma
- Garfield County, Utah
- Garfield County, Washington

== Counties named for John Adams and John Quincy Adams ==
At least five counties in the United States are named after John Adams (1735–1826), the second president of the United States.

- Adams County, Idaho
- Adams County, Mississippi
- Adams County, Nebraska
- Adams County, Pennsylvania
- Adams County, Washington

At least three counties in the United States are named after John Quincy Adams (1767–1848), the sixth president of the United States.

- Adams County, Illinois
- Adams County, Indiana
- Adams County, Wisconsin

It is unclear whether Adams County, Ohio and Adams County, Iowa are named after John Adams or John Quincy Adams.

Two other Adams counties exist in the United States. Adams County, Colorado is named after Alva Adams, the fifth governor of Colorado. Adams County, North Dakota is named after the railroad agent John Quincy Adams, who was a distant cousin to his namesake president.

== Counties named for William Henry Harrison ==
Four counties in the United States are named after William Henry Harrison (1773–1841), the ninth president of the United States.

- Harrison County, Indiana
- Harrison County, Iowa
- Harrison County, Mississippi
- Harrison County, Ohio

Four other Harrison counties exist in the United States. Harrison County, Kentucky was named after Benjamin Harrison, an early settler of Kentucky. Harrison County, Missouri was named after U.S. Congressman Albert G. Harrison. Harrison County, Texas was named after Jonas Harrison, a lawyer and Texas revolutionary. Harrison County, West Virginia was named after Benjamin Harrison V, a signer of the Declaration of Independence and the father of William Henry Harrison.

== Counties named for Franklin Pierce ==
Four counties in the United States are named after Franklin Pierce (1804–1869), the fourteenth president of the United States.

- Pierce County, Georgia
- Pierce County, Nebraska
- Pierce County, Washington
- Pierce County, Wisconsin

Pierce County, North Dakota was named after Gilbert Ashville Pierce, a Governor of Dakota Territory and later a U.S. Senator from North Dakota.

== Counties named for Zachary Taylor ==
Four counties in the United States are named after Zachary Taylor (1784–1850), the twelfth president of the United States.

- Taylor County, Florida
- Taylor County, Georgia
- Taylor County, Iowa
- Taylor County, Kentucky

Three other Taylor counties exist in the United States. Taylor County, Texas was named after Edward Taylor, George Taylor, and James Taylor, three brothers who died at the Battle of the Alamo. Taylor County, West Virginia was named after politician and writer John Taylor. Taylor County, Wisconsin was named after Governor William Robert Taylor.

== Counties named for Martin Van Buren ==
Four counties in the United States are named after Martin Van Buren (1782–1862), the eighth president of the United States.

- Van Buren County, Arkansas
- Van Buren County, Iowa
- Van Buren County, Michigan
- Van Buren County, Tennessee

== Counties named for James Buchanan ==
Three counties in the United States are named after James Buchanan (1791–1868), the fifteenth president of the United States.

- Buchanan County, Iowa
- Buchanan County, Missouri
- Buchanan County, Virginia

== Counties named for Millard Fillmore ==
Three counties in the United States are named after Millard Fillmore (1800–1874), the thirteenth president of the United States.

- Fillmore County, Minnesota
- Fillmore County, Nebraska
- Millard County, Utah

== Counties named for Grover Cleveland ==
Two counties in the United States are named after Grover Cleveland (1837–1908), the twenty-second and twenty-fourth president of the United States.

- Cleveland County, Arkansas
- Cleveland County, Oklahoma

Cleveland County, North Carolina was named after Benjamin Cleveland, a colonel in the American Revolutionary War who took part in the Battle of King's Mountain.

== Counties named for Theodore Roosevelt ==
Two counties in the United States are named after Theodore Roosevelt (1858–1919), the twenty-sixth president of the United States.

- Roosevelt County, Montana
- Roosevelt County, New Mexico

== Counties named for John Tyler ==
Tyler County, Texas was named after John Tyler (1790–1862), the tenth president of the United States.

Tyler County, West Virginia was named for John Tyler Sr., the father of President Tyler.

== Counties named for Chester A. Arthur ==
Arthur County, Nebraska was named after Chester A. Arthur (1829–1886), the twenty-first president of the United States.

== Counties named for Warren G. Harding ==
Harding County, New Mexico was named after Warren G. Harding (1865–1923), the twenty-ninth president of the United States.

Harding County, South Dakota was named after territorial legislator J. A. Harding.

== Counties named for Rutherford B. Hayes ==
Hayes County, Nebraska was named after Rutherford B. Hayes (1822–1893), the nineteenth president of the United States

== Counties named for William McKinley ==
McKinley County, New Mexico was named after William McKinley (1843–1901), the twenty-fifth president of the United States.

== Other counties and presidents ==
=== Presidents with no county named after them ===
The following 21 presidents do not have a county named after them: Andrew Johnson, Benjamin Harrison, William Howard Taft, Woodrow Wilson, Calvin Coolidge, Herbert Hoover, Franklin D. Roosevelt, Harry S. Truman, Dwight D. Eisenhower, John F. Kennedy, Lyndon B. Johnson, Richard Nixon, Gerald R. Ford, Jimmy Carter, Ronald Reagan, George H. W. Bush, Bill Clinton, George W. Bush, Barack Obama, Donald Trump, and Joe Biden.

In the United States, there are twelve counties named Johnson County, nine named Clinton County, five named Carter County, four named Wilson County, two named Ford County, and one named Reagan County, but none of them are named after presidents.

=== Counties previously named for presidents ===
==== Renamed counties ====
Cass County, Missouri was originally established as Van Buren County in honor of President Martin Van Buren. It was renamed in 1849 after Senator Lewis Cass.

Stephens County, Texas was originally established as Buchanan County in honor of President James Buchanan. It was renamed in 1861 for Alexander H. Stephens, the vice president of the Confederate States of America.

==== Defunct counties ====
Washington, D.C. formerly had a county known as Washington County, D.C., but that county was abolished through the District of Columbia Organic Act of 1871.

Garfield County, Kansas was named for President James A. Garfield. It existed from 1887 to 1893, when it became part of Finney County, Kansas.

== See also ==
- List of places named after people in the United States
- Lists of U.S. county name etymologies
- List of the most common U.S. county names
- Presidential memorials in the United States
