= List of Philadelphia placename etymologies =

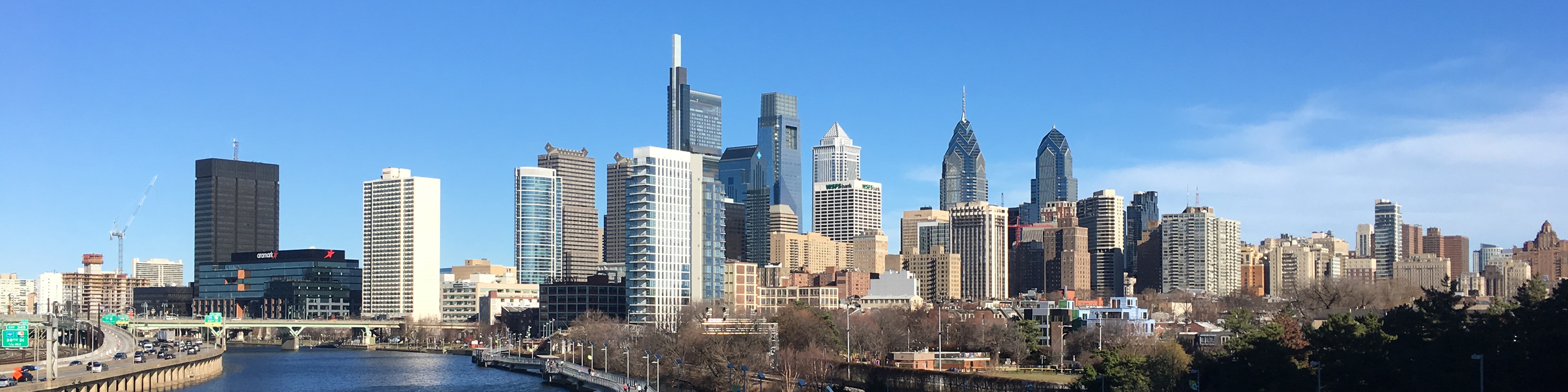
Philadelphia Skyline

This is a list of the sources of some of the place names in the city of Philadelphia, Pennsylvania:

== Streets ==
Street Name	Source
Allegheny Avenue	Named for the Allegheny River and Allegheny County, Pennsylvania.
Arch Street	Formerly known as Mulberry Street (one of William Penn's streets named for trees, this one was named for the Mulberry tree). Became known as Arch Street because Front Street formed an arch or bridge when it passed over Mulberry Street, with the latter going down to the riverside to form a public landing up until the 1720s. The name nevertheless stuck, long after most people had forgotten the arch itself.
Aramingo Avenue	Named for Aramingo Borough whose name was a corruption of the Lenni Lenapi stream name Tumanaraming, meaning "Wolf Walk."
Baltimore Avenue	Originally Baltimore Pike, named for the destination city of Baltimore, Maryland
Blair Street	Named for John Blair.
Broad Street	As with "Broad Street" in various other towns and cities, the street was named for its breadth and laid out and developed as a central thoroughfare.
Cecil B. Moore Avenue	Named in honor of the late Philadelphia civil rights attorney Cecil B. Moore, who led the fight to integrate Girard College and was the president of the local NAACP and a member of Philadelphia's City Council. The street formerly called Columbia Avenue.
Callowhill Street	Named for Hannah Callowhill Penn, William Penn's second wife and acting proprietor of the Colony of Pennsylvania from 1712 to 1726.
Cheltenham Avenue	Follows the border between Cheltenham Township, Montgomery County and Philadelphia County.
Cherry Street	One of William Penn's streets named for trees, this one was named for the cherry tree.
Chestnut Street	One of William Penn's streets named for trees, this one was named for the chestnut tree.
Chew Avenue	Named after Chief Justice of the Supreme Court of Province of Pennsylvania, Benjamin Chew
Christopher Columbus Boulevard	Formerly Delaware Avenue because it ran along the Delaware River. Renamed in honor of explorer Christopher Columbus upon the 500th anniversary of his famous 1492 voyage, as requested by various Italian Americans of South Philadelphia.
City Avenue	The street is also U.S. 1, and its name refers to its role as both the Philadelphia city line and the Montgomery County line.
Dauphin Street	Named for Dauphin County, Pennsylvania
D'Harnoncourt Drive	Formerly Art Museum Drive, renamed in 2010 for Anne d'Harnoncourt
Dickinson Street	Named for John Dickinson, Continental Congressman and one of the signers of the Constitution.
Elfreth's Alley	Named after Jeremiah Elfreth, an 18th-century blacksmith and property owner. It is one of the oldest continuously inhabited residential streets in the United States of America, dating to 1702.
Federal Street	The road between two Federal properties, the Philadelphia Navy Yard and the Schuylkill Arsenal
Benjamin Franklin Parkway	Named for Benjamin Franklin.
Front Street	Like "Front Street" in various other towns and cities, it was named after a riverfront, in this case the Delaware riverfront, which for several centuries was the economic and social heart of the city. It replaces what would be called "1st Street" in the city's grid; some sources state that this is because Quakers, including city founder and designer William Penn and his surveyor Thomas Holme, believe that the number one should only be used in reference to God, though other sources question that reasoning.
Germantown Avenue	It was the road to Germantown when Germantown was still a separate town, several miles outside Philadelphia.
Girard Avenue, Girard Point, and Girard Point Bridge	Named after financier Stephen Girard.
Independence Mall East, Independence Mall West	Named after Independence Mall, the district whose heart is Independence Hall.
Kelly Drive	Formerly East River Drive because it runs along the east bank of the Schuylkill River, it was renamed in honor of the Olympic athlete John B. Kelly Jr.
John F. Kennedy Boulevard	Built in the 1950s as part of the large redevelopment of the Pennsylvania Railroad "Chinese Wall" and the former Broad Street Station that created Penn Center; it was for several years called Pennsylvania Boulevard before being renamed for John F. Kennedy after his assassination. It serves as part of Pennsylvania Route 3.
Lancaster Avenue	Originally Lancaster Pike, the street is named for the destination city of Lancaster, Pennsylvania.
Locust Street	One of William Penn's streets named for trees, this one was named after the locust tree.
Market Street	As with "Market Street" in many other towns and cities, it was for several centuries the main market site because of the addition of the High Street Market in 1745. Market Street was previously known as High Street and was one of William Penn's original names for the city.
Manayunk	The neighborhood's name comes from the word manaiung, meaning "place where we go to drink" in Lenape.
Martin Luther King Jr. Drive	Formerly called West River Drive because it runs along the west bank of the Schuylkill River, the street was renamed in honor of the slain civil rights leader Martin Luther King Jr.
Mount Pleasant Drive	Named after the historic mansion Mount Pleasant, which was built by a privateer in what was then the countryside outside of the city. It is now an off-premises gallery of the Philadelphia Museum of Art in Fairmount Park.
Moyamensing Avenue	Named after a Lenni Lenape word meaning "pigeon droppings."
Old York Road, York Road, King's Highway	The old road to New York City was named, as were that city and its province, for James, Duke of York (later King James II and VII.)
Passyunk Avenue	Named after the Lenape word meaning "in the valley" or "in the valleys."
Philmont Ave	Named after the county line between Philadelphia and Montgomery Counties, which it runs along for part of its route (Phil + Mont).
Pine Street	One of William Penn's streets named after trees, this one named after the pine tree.
Race Street	Originally called Sassafras Street, it was until the mid-19th century was often used as a horse race track, the era's equivalent of today's street racing. Eventually, Race Street became the street's official name.
Reed Street	Named after Joseph Reed, a statesman during the American Revolution.
Ridge Avenue	Named after the ridge of high ground between the Wissahickon and Schuylkill valleys, which the avenue follows.
Rising Sun Avenue	Named after the Rising Sun Tavern, which was an important roadhouse in colonial times.
Roosevelt Boulevard/Roosevelt Expressway	Named after President Theodore Roosevelt.
Sansom Street	Named by the developer William Sansom afterhimself (See Jewelers' Row)
Shackamaxon Street	Named after the historic village in which the Shackamaxon Treaty was signed between William Penn and the village leaders of the Lenape tribe.
South Street	Formerly known as Cedar Street (originally one of William Penn's streets named after trees, in this case cedar trees). It was the original southern border of the city of Philadelphia, before the 1854 Act of Consolidation.
Susquehanna Avenue	Named after the Susquehanna River and Susquehanna County, Pennsylvania.
Spruce Street	One of William Penn's streets named after trees, this one named after the spruce tree.
Walnut Street	One of William Penn's streets named after trees, this one named for after walnut tree.
Vine Street	One of William Penn's streets named after trees, this one was named after vines.

== Place names ==
Place Name	Source
Clark Park	Built on land donated by Clarence Howard Clark, originally known as "Clarence H. Clark Park".
Delaware River	Named after the Delaware Bay, which was named after Thomas West, 3rd Baron De La Warr, Governor of the Jamestown Colony.
Fern Rock	Named after the ancestral estate of Elisha Kent Kane, a renowned Arctic explorer and naval surgeon from Philadelphia.
Fox Chase	Named after the "Fox Chase Inn," which catered to affluent fox hunters.
Franklin Square	Named after the Philadelphia statesman Benjamin Franklin.
Independence Mall	Named after Independence Hall.
Lemon Hill	Named for the numerous lemon trees in Robert Morris's greenhouse.
Logan Circle	Named Logan Square after the Philadelphia statesman James Logan.
Manayunk	From the Lenape name for the Schuylkill River, "Manaiung;" their word for "river" literally translates as "place to drink."
Marconi Plaza	In honor of the Nobel Prize Laureate Guglielmo Marconi, the inventor of radio.
Mount Airy	Named after the estate of William Allen, a mayor of Philadelphia .
Nicetown	Named after immigrants to the area whose surname has appeared with many spellings over the centuries, including Neues, Neus, Neiss, Nice, and Nyce.
Pastorius Park	Named in honor of Francis Pastorius, a leader of early German immigrants to the area.
Queen Village	Named for Queen Christina of Sweden, who promoted the European settlement of the area.
Rittenhouse Square	Named for David Rittenhouse.
RittenhouseTown	Named after William Rittenhouse, a papermaker.
Roxborough	The area was likely named for Roxburghshire, Scotland, the original home of Andrew Robeson, one of the early settlers of what is now Roxborough.
Society Hill	Named after the Free Society of Traders, which had its offices in the area.
Southwark	Named after a district in London.
Torresdale	Originally Torrisdale, named by Charles Macalester after his Scotland home.
Washington Square	Named after US President George Washington.
Wicaco	From the Lenni Lenapi name for the area meaning "Pleasant Place."
Wissahickon Creek	From the Lenape for "catfish creek" or "stream of yellowish color."
