= List of place names of Ukrainian origin in the United States =

A handful of places in the United States have names that come from Ukrainian roots. Most of them appear in states where Ukrainians settled in noticeable numbers—especially Pennsylvania, New York, and parts of the Midwest. These names usually reflect towns, regions, or cultural references that immigrants wanted to remember from home, such as Kyiv or Galicia.

== Table ==
Place name	State	Origin/notes
Kief	North Dakota	Named by Black Sea German settlers after Kyiv, Ukraine.
Ukraina (Ghost Town)	North Dakota	Named by immigrants to North Dakota from towns in Ternopil Oblast, Ukraine.
Alma	Virginia	Named after the Alma River in Ukraine.
Odessa	Texas	Odesa.
Odessa	Delaware	Named after Odesa in an attempt to keep the town alive as a major port.
Sevastopol	Indiana	Sevastopol.
Balta	North Dakota	Renamed by locals after the city Balta in the Russian Empire (current Ukraine)
Selz	North Dakota	named by German-Russian settlers after the village of Selz (in the Kutschurgan/Odesa area)
