= Union County =

Union County may refer to:

== Counties in the United States ==
- Union County, Arkansas
- Union County, Florida
- Union County, Georgia
- Union County, Illinois
- Union County, Indiana
- Union County, Iowa
- Union County, Kentucky
- Union County, Mississippi
- Union County, New Jersey, the most populous Union County in the country
- Union County, New Mexico
- Union County, North Carolina
- Union County, Ohio
- Union County, Oregon
- Union County, Pennsylvania
- Union County, South Carolina
- Union County, South Dakota
- Union County, Tennessee

== Film ==
- Union County (film), a 2026 drama film

== See also ==
- Union Parish, Louisiana
