= William C. Hughes =

American politician, lawyer

William C. Hughes was a prominent lawyer in Oklahoma.

== Biography ==
He was born October 24, 1869, in Georgetown, Missouri, later moving to Sedalia and Kansas City, Missouri. In March 1901, Hughes moved from Kansas City to Oklahoma City, and became known statewide as a lawyer. In 1906, Hughes was elected to the Oklahoma Constitutional Convention, where he served as Chairman of the Municipal Corporation Committee, using this position to write provisions of the Oklahoma Constitution that dealt with municipal governments in Oklahoma. He also wrote the provisions of the constitution prohibiting child labor and establishing the offices of state commissioner and the commissioner of charities and corrections.

== Legacy ==
Hughes County, Oklahoma, is named after him. Hughes later returned to Missouri, moving to St. Joseph.
