= Madison County =

Madison County may refer to the following counties in the United States:

- Madison County, Alabama
- Madison County, Arkansas
- Madison County, Florida
- Madison County, Georgia
- Madison County, Idaho
- Madison County, Illinois
- Madison County, Indiana
- Madison County, Iowa
- Madison County, Kentucky, originally Madison County, Virginia (1785–1792)
- Madison County, Mississippi
- Madison County, Missouri
- Madison County, Montana
- Madison County, Nebraska
- Madison County, New York
- Madison County, North Carolina
- Madison County, Ohio
- Madison County, Tennessee
- Madison County, Texas
- Madison County, Virginia (established 1792)

== See also ==
- The Bridges of Madison County, book and film set in Madison County, Iowa
- Madison County (film), a 2011 film
- Madison Parish, Louisiana
