= List of U.S. counties named after rivers =

This is a list of U.S. counties that are named for rivers and streams.

== Counties named for rivers (alphabetical by county name) ==
=== A ===
- Alamance County, North Carolina: Alamance is named for Great Alamance Creek.
- Allegany County, New York: Allegany is a variant spelling of the Allegheny River.
- Alleghany County, North Carolina: Alleghany is a corruption of the Native American Delaware tribe's word for the Allegheny River, which is said to have meant a fine stream.
- Allegheny County, Pennsylvania: Allegheny is a corruption of the Native American Delaware tribe's word for the Allegheny River, which is said to have meant a fine stream.
- Amite County, Mississippi: Amite County is named for the Amite River.
- Androscoggin County, Maine: Androscoggin County is named for the Androscoggin River
- Appomattox County, Virginia: Appomattox is named for the Appomattox River, which is in turn named for the Appamatucks Native American people.
- Aroostook County, Maine: named for the Aroostook River.
- Ashtabula County, Ohio: Ashtabula was named for the Ashtabula River.
- Asotin County, Washington: Asotin is named for the Nez Percé name for Eel Creek.
- Auglaize County, Ohio: Auglaize is named for the Auglaize River.

=== B ===
- Beaver County, Oklahoma: Beaver is named for its county seat of Beaver, Oklahoma and the Beaver River, which flows through the county.
- Beaver County, Pennsylvania: named for the Beaver River./
- Benzie County, Michigan is an Americanization of the French name, Riviere Aux-Bec-Scies, for the local river.
- Blanco County, Texas: Blanco is named for the Blanco River. Blanco means white in the Spanish language.
- Boise County, Idaho: Boise is named after the Boise River. Boise is French for "timber".
- Bosque County, Texas: Bosque is named for the Bosque River.
- Brazoria County, Texas: Brazoria is named for the Brazos River.
- Brazos County, Texas: Brazos is named for the Brazos River.
- Buffalo County, Wisconsin: Buffalo is named for the Buffalo River.

=== C ===
- Canadian County, Oklahoma: Canadian County is named for the Canadian River, which flows through the county.
- Cassia County, Idaho: Cassia is named after Cassia Creek.
- Cattaraugus County, New York:Cattargus County is named for Cattaraugus Creek
- Cedar County, Iowa: Cedar is named for the Cedar River.
- Chariton County, Missouri: Chariton is named from the Chariton River.
- Chattahoochee County, Georgia: Chattahoochee is named for the Chattahoochee River of Georgia, which also forms part of the Alabama-Georgia state line.
- Chattooga County, Georgia: Chattooga is named for the Chattooga River in northeast Georgia.
- Cheboygan County, Michigan is named for the Cheboygan River, which was itself a Native American name.
- Chippewa County, Minnesota is named after the Chippewa River, which flows through the county.
- Clarion County, Pennsylvania is named for the Clarion River.
- Clear Creek County, Colorado: Clear Creek is named for Clear Creek, which runs through the county.
- Clearwater County, Idaho: Clearwater is named after the Clearwater River.
- Clearwater County, Minnesota is named after the Clearwater River and Clearwater Lake, which are both located within the county.
- Colorado County, Texas: Colorado is named for the Colorado River.
- Columbia County, Oregon: Named for the Columbia River which it borders.
- Columbia County, Washington: Columbia is named for the Columbia River.
- Coosa County, Alabama: Named for the Coosa River of Alabama & Georgia
- Cottonwood County, Minnesota is named after the Cottonwood River, which flows through the county.
- Costilla County, Colorado: Costilla is named for the Costilla River.
- Cuyahoga County, Ohio: Cuyahoga is named for the Cuyahoga River.
- Conecuh County, Alabama: Conecuh is named for the Conecuh River in southern Alabama.

=== D ===
- Delaware County, Pennsylvania: named for the Delaware River.
- Des Moines County, Iowa: Des Moines is named for the Des Moines River.
- Deschutes County, Oregon: Deschutes is named for the Deschutes River.
- Dolores County, Colorado: Dolores is named for the Dolores River, originally Rio de Nuestra Senora de los Dolores, or, in English, "River of our Lady of Sorrows".
- DuPage County, Illinois is named after the DuPage River.

=== E ===
- Eagle County, Colorado: Eagle is named for the Eagle River.
- Elk County, Kansas: Elk is named for the Elk River.
- Escambia County, Florida: Escambia is named for the Escambia River.
- Escambia County, Alabama: Escambia, AL is also named for the Escambia River.

=== F ===
- Fluvanna County, Virginia: Fluvanna, VA is named for the Fluvanna River, a previous name for the James River. Fluvanna is Latin for Anne's River after Queen Anne of Great Britain.

=== G ===
- Gasconade County, Missouri: Gasconade is named for the Gasconade River.
- Gila County, Arizona: Gila is named for the Gila River.
- Grand County, Colorado: Grand is named for the Grand River, later renamed the Colorado River.
- Grand County, Utah: Grand is named for the Grand River, later renamed the Colorado River.
- Greenbrier County, West Virginia: Greenbrier is named for the Greenbrier River.

=== H ===
- Hillsborough County, Florida: Hillsborough is named for the Hillsborough River (Florida), which in turn is named after Wills Hill, Viscount Hillsborough, a British politician during the period of the American Revolutionary War who ordered the mapping of the river's course.
- Hocking County, Ohio: Hocking is named for the Hocking River.
- Hood River County, Oregon: Named for the Hood River, a river in the county.
- Humboldt County, Nevada: Humboldt is named for the Humboldt River, named in turn for Friedrich Heinrich Alexander von Humboldt, the famous German scientist, explorer and statesman.
- Hudson County, New Jersey: Hudson is named for the Hudson River, which in turn is named after Henry Hudson.

=== I ===
- Indian River County, Florida: Indian River is named for the Indian River, which is not a real river, but rather is a long, narrow saltwater lagoon between the mainland and the barrier islands.
- Iowa County, Iowa: Iowa is named for the Iowa River and the Iowa Native American tribe.

=== J ===
- Judith Basin County, Montana: Judith Basin is named for the Judith River.
- Juniata County, Pennsylvania is named for the Juniata River.

=== K ===
- Kalamazoo County, Michigan is named for the Kalamazoo River. Kalamazoo is an Anglicized Native American word which probably meant boiling water.
- Kankakee County, Illinois: Kankakee is named after the Kankakee River.
- Kanabec County, Minnesota: Kanabec is named after the Snake River, which flows through the area. Kanabec is Ojibwa for snake.
- Kanawha County, West Virginia: Kanawha is named for the Kanawha River.
- Kennebec County, Maine: Kennebec is named for the Kennebec River.
- Kern County, California: Kern is named after the Kern River, which is named in turn for Edward M. Kern, a topographer who accompanied John C. Frémont on an early expedition through the state.
- Keya Paha County, Nebraska: Keya Paha is named for the Dakota words Ké-ya Pa-há Wa-kpá, which, translated, mean Turtle Hill River.
- Kings County, California: Kings is named for the Kings River.
- Koochiching County, Minnesota is named after a Cree word of uncertain meaning given by Ojibwas to Rainy River.

=== L ===
- Lackawanna County, Pennsylvania: Lackawanna is named after the Lackawanna River.
- Las Animas County, Colorado: Las Animas is named for the Las Animas River, originally El Rio de las Animas Perdidas en Purgatorio, or, in English, "River of the Souls Lost in Purgatory".
- Latah County, Idaho: Latah is named after Latah Creek.
- Lehigh County, Pennsylvania: Lehigh is named after the Lehigh River; a tributary of the Delaware River.
- Limestone County, Alabama: Limestone is named for Limestone Creek, which runs through the county and has a bed of limestone.
- Little River County, Arkansas: Little River is named for the Little River.
- Loup County, Nebraska: Loup is named for the Loup River.
- Lycoming County, Pennsylvania: named for Lycoming Creek.

=== M ===
- Mahoning County, Ohio: Mahoning is named for the Mahoning River.
- Malheur County, Oregon: Malheur is named for the Malheur River.
- Manistee County, Michigan was named for the Manistee River, which in turn had Native American name meaning river at whose mouth there are islands.
- Maries County, Missouri: Maries is named from the Maries River.
- Merrimack County, New Hampshire: Merrimack is named for the Merrimack River.
- Mississippi County, Arkansas: Mississippi is named for the Mississippi River.
- Mississippi County, Missouri: Mississippi is named after the Mississippi River.
- Moniteau County, Missouri: Montineau is named after Moniteau Creek.
- Monongalia County, West Virginia: Monongalia is named for the Monongahela River.
- Muskegon County, Michigan is named for the Muskegon River, named for the Ojibwa language word meaning swamp or marsh.
- Musselshell County, Montana: Musselshell is named for the Musselshell River, named in turn by the Lewis and Clark Expedition presumably due to mussels found on its banks.

=== N ===
- Nemaha County, Kansas: Nemaha is named for the Nemaha River.
- Nemaha County, Nebraska: Nemaha is named for Nimaha, the Oto name meaning miry water for a stream which crossed the county and emptied into the Missouri River.
- Neosho County, Kansas: Neosho is named for the Neosho River.
- Niobrara County, Wyoming: Niobrara is named for the Niobrara River. Niobrara is Omaha for flat or broad river.
- Nodaway County, Missouri: Nodaway is named from the Nodaway River. Nodaway is a Potawatomi word meaning placid.

=== O ===
- Oconee County, Georgia: Oconee is named for the Oconee River that forms part of the county's border
- Ohio County, Indiana: Ohio is named for the Ohio River.
- Ohio County, Kentucky: Also named for the Ohio River. When the county was formed, the river formed its northern boundary, but no longer does after several new counties were carved from it.
- Ohio County, West Virginia: Also named for the Ohio River.
- Ontonagon County, Michigan is named for a river called Nantounagon on an early French map.
- Otter Tail County, Minnesota: Otter Tail is named after Otter Tail Lake and Otter Tail River. The river was named by the Ojibwa for its long sandbar shaped like an otter's tail.
- Osage County, Kansas: Osage is named for the Osage River.
- Osage County, Missouri: Osage is named for the Osage River.
- Oswego County, New York: Oswego is named for the Oswego River.
- Ouachita County, Arkansas: Ouachita is named for the Ouachita River.
- Ouachita Parish, Louisiana: named for the Ouachita River

=== P ===
- Payette County, Idaho: Payette is named after the Payette River, which, in turn, is named for explorer Francois Payette.
- Pearl River County, Mississippi: Named for the Pearl River, obviously
- Pecos County, Texas: Pecos [pey-kuhs] is named after the Pecos River. The name "Pecos" derives from the Keresan (Native American language) term for the Pecos Pueblo, [p'æyok'ona].
- Platte County, Nebraska: Platte is named for the Platte River.
- Platte County, Missouri: Platte is named for the Platte River.
- Platte County, Wyoming: Platte is named for the North Platte River. Platte is French for flat.
- Plumas County, California: Plumas is named for Spanish name for the Feather River (Rio de las Plumas), which flows through the county.
- Powder River County, Montana: Powder River is named for the Powder River, which in turn was named for gunpowder-like sand along its banks.

=== R ===
- Racine County, Wisconsin: Racine is named for the Root River, racine being the French word for root.
- Rappahannock County, Virginia: Rappahannock is named for the Rappahannock River, named in turn for the Rappahannock Native American people.
- Red Lake County, Minnesota: Red Lake County is named after the Red Lake River, named by the Ojibwa for its reddish sand and water.
- Red River County, Texas: Red River is named for the Red River.
- Red River Parish, Louisiana: named for the Red River
- Redwood County, Minnesota: Redwood County is named after the Redwood River, which flows through the county.
- Republic County, Kansas: Republic is named for the Republican River, which in turn was named for the Pawnee Republic which once existed near the river.
- Rio Arriba County, New Mexico: Rio Arriba is named for its location on the upper Rio Grande. (Rio Arriba is "upper river" in Spanish.)
- Rio Blanco County, Colorado: Rio Blanco is named for Rio Blanco, or, in English, the White River.
- Rio Grande County, Colorado: Rio Grande is named for the Rio Grande, which runs through the county.
- Rock County, Wisconsin: Rock is named for the Rock River.
- Roseau County, Minnesota: Roseau County is named after the Roseau Lake and Roseau River.
- Rosebud County, Montana: Rosebud is named for the Rosebud River, which was named for the many wild roses along the banks of the river.

=== S ===
- Sacramento County, California: Named for the Sacramento River
- Saline County, Arkansas: Named for the Saline River.
- Saline County, Illinois: Named for the Saline River.
- Saline County, Kansas: Named for the Saline River.
- San Benito County, California: Named for San Benito Creek.
- San Juan County, Colorado: Named for the San Juan River and San Juan Mountains.
- San Juan County, New Mexico: Named for the San Juan River.
- San Miguel County, Colorado: Named for the San Miguel River.
- Santa Cruz County, Arizona: Named for the Santa Cruz River.
- Sangamon County, Illinois Named for the Sangamon River.
- Schuylkill County, Pennsylvania: named for the Schuylkill River.
- Scioto County, Ohio: Named for the Scioto River.
- Sevier County, Utah: Named for the Sevier River.
- Shenandoah County, Virginia: Named for the Shenandoah River; Shenandoah is a Native American term meaning beautiful daughter of the stars.
- Shiawassee County, Michigan: Shiawassee is named for the Shiawassee River.
- St. Francis County, Arkansas: St. Francis is named for the St. Francis River.
- St. Johns County, Florida: St. Johns is named for the St. Johns River.
- St. Joseph County, Indiana: St. Joseph is named for the St. Joseph River.
- St. Joseph County, Michigan: St. Joseph is named for the St. Joseph River
- St. Lawrence County, New York: St. Lawrence is named for the St. Lawrence River.
- St. Louis County, Minnesota: St. Louis is named after the St. Louis River.
- Stillwater County, Montana: Stillwater is named for the Stillwater River, named for its very slow current.
- Susquehanna County, Pennsylvania named after the Susquehanna River.
- Suwannee County, Florida: Suwannee is named for the Suwannee River, the same river made famous by Stephen Foster in his song Old Folks at Home.
- Sweetwater County, Wyoming: Sweetwater is named for the Sweetwater River.

=== T ===
- Tallapoosa County, Alabama: Named for the Tallapoosa River. Tallapoosa is believed to be a Choctaw word meaning pulverized rock.
- Tangipahoa Parish, Louisiana: Named for the Tangipahoa River
- Tensas Parish, Louisiana: Named for the Tensas River
- Tioga County, Pennsylvania: Named for the Tioga River
- Tippecanoe County, Indiana: Tippecanoe is named for the Tippecanoe River and the Battle of Tippecanoe.
- Tuscaloosa County, Alabama: Tuscaloosa was a Native American name for the Black Warrior River.
- Tuscarawas County, Ohio: Tuscarawas is named for the Tuscarawas River.

=== V ===
- Vermilion County, Illinois: Vermilion is named for both the Vermilion River and the Little Vermilion River.

=== W ===
- Wabash County, Indiana: Wabash is named for the Wabash River.
- Wabash County, Illinois: Wabash is named for the Wabash River.
- Wicomico County, Maryland: Wicomico is named for the Wicomico River. In Lenape, wicko mekee indicated a place where houses are built, possibly in reference to a settlement.

=== Y ===
- Yamhill County, Oregon: Yamhill is named after the Yamhill River.
- Yellow Medicine County, Minnesota: Yellow Medicine County is named after the Yellow Medicine River, which flows through the county.

== Counties possibly named for rivers ==
- Cumberland County, Illinois: Cumberland is named for either the Cumberland River or the Cumberland Road.
- San Juan County, Utah: San Juan is possibly named for the San Juan River.
- Skamania County, Washington: Skamania is named for a Chinookan word meaning swift water.

== Counties indirectly named for rivers ==
- Aroostook County, Maine: Aroostook is named for a Native American word meaning beautiful river.
- Canyon County, Idaho: Canyon is named after either the Boise River or Snake River canyons.
- Coös County, New Hampshire: Coös is named for a Native American word meaning crooked, in reference to a bend in the Connecticut River.
- Crow Wing County, Minnesota: Crow Wing is named after an island shaped like a raven's wing at the junction of the Crow Wing River and Mississippi River.
- Huerfano County, Colorado: Huerfano is named for Huerfano Butte, as was the Huerfano River. Huerfano is orphan in Spanish.
- Merced County, California: Merced is named for the Spanish word for mercy, and was named by Spanish explorers in gratitude for water of the Merced River, which was found after a dry 40-mile trek.
- Muskingum County, Ohio: Muskingum is a Delaware word meaning by the river side.
- Riverside County, California: Riverside is named for the city of Riverside, the county seat, which in turn was named for its location beside the Santa Ana River.
- Sagadahoc County, Maine: Sagadahoc is named for a Native American word meaning mouth of big river.
- Twin Falls County, Idaho: Twin Falls is named after the double falls along the Snake River.
- Yellowstone County, Montana: Yellowstone is named for the yellow rocks found along what is now known as the Yellowstone River.

== See also ==
- County (United States)
- Lists of U.S. county name etymologies
