= List of U.S. counties named after women =

This is a list of U.S. counties which are named after women. Items may be listed in more than one category.

== Locals and settlers ==
- Ada County, Idaho, named for Ada Riggs, the first pioneer child born in the area and the daughter of Boise, Idaho cofounder H.C. Riggs.
- Dare County, North Carolina, named for Virginia Dare, the first English child born in the New World who disappeared with the Lost Colony.
- East Feliciana Parish and West Feliciana Parish, Louisiana, allegedly named for Marie Félicité St. Maxent, the wife of Bernardo de Gálvez, a Spanish governor of the Louisiana Territory.
- Florence County, South Carolina, named for Florence Harllee, a daughter of W. W. Harllee, a president of the Wilmington and Manchester Railroad.
- Grainger County, Tennessee, named for Mary Grainger Blount, the wife of William Blount, the only governor of the Southwest Territory (modern Tennessee).
- Hart County, Georgia, named for Nancy Hart, a sharpshooter and patriot in the American Revolutionary War.
- Josephine County, Oregon, named for Virginia "Josephine" Rollins, the first European-American woman to settle in southern Oregon.
- Marshall County, Oklahoma, named for the mother of George A. Henshaw, a delegate to the state constitutional convention, Marshall having been her maiden name.
- Merrick County, Nebraska, named for Elvira Merrick, wife of Henry W. DePuy, a territorial legislator.
- Wake County, North Carolina, named for Margaret Wake, a London heiress and the wife of William Tryon, a colonial governor of North Carolina.

== Native Americans ==
- Angelina County, Texas, named for a Hasinai Native American woman who assisted early Spanish missionaries and was named Angelina by them.
- Marinette County, Wisconsin, named for Marinette, a 19th-century trader who was the daughter of a French-Canadian trapper and a Menominee woman.
- Pocahontas County, West Virginia (formerly Pocahontas County, Virginia) and Pocahontas County, Iowa: named for Pocahontas, the famous Native American who played a leading role in the history of the first permanent English settlements in North America.
- Tama County, Iowa, named for any of several Native American chiefs or chief's wives, over which there is dispute.
- Tippah County, Mississippi, named for Tippah, wife of Pontotoc, an important Chickasaw leader.
- Winona County, Minnesota, named for Wenonah (which means oldest daughter in Dakota), a Dakota woman of distinction who was a cousin of the last of three chiefs named Wabasha.

== Famous women ==
- Barton County, Kansas, named for Clara Barton, the pioneering American nurse who organized the American Red Cross.
- Bremer County, Iowa, named for Fredrika Bremer, a Swedish novelist.

== Titled noblewomen and queens ==
- Amelia County, Virginia, named for Princess Amelia of Great Britain, daughter of George II.
- Anne Arundel County, Maryland, named for Anne Arundell, the wife of Cecil Calvert, 2nd Baron Baltimore and daughter of Thomas Arundell, 1st Baron Arundell of Wardour.
- Augusta County, Virginia, named for Augusta of Saxe-Gotha, wife of Frederick, Prince of Wales and mother of George III of Great Britain.
- Caroline County, Maryland, named for Lady Caroline Eden, the daughter of Charles Calvert, 5th Baron Baltimore, sister of Frederick Calvert, 6th Baron Baltimore, and wife of Robert Eden, the last colonial governor of Maryland.
- Caroline County, Virginia, named for Caroline of Ansbach, wife of George II of Great Britain.
- Three counties named for Charlotte of Mecklenburg-Strelitz, wife of George III:
  - Charlotte County, Virginia
  - Mecklenburg County, North Carolina
  - Mecklenburg County, Virginia
- Dutchess County, New York, named for Mary of Modena, the Duchess of York and wife of the future King James II of England.
- Isabella County, Michigan, named for Queen Isabella I of Castile, who patronized Christopher Columbus.
- King and Queen County, Virginia, named for King William III of England and Queen Mary II of England.
- Louisa County, Virginia, named for Princess Louise, daughter of George II.
- Queen Anne's County, Maryland, named for Anne, Queen of Great Britain.
- Queens County, New York, named for Catherine of Braganza, Queen of England and wife of Charles II.
- Somerset County, Maryland, named for Mary, Lady Somerset, the wife of Sir John Somerset and daughter of Thomas Arundell, 1st Baron Arundell of Wardour.
- Staunton, Virginia (an independent city), named for Lady Rebecca Staunton, wife of Virginia colonial governor Sir William Gooch, 1st Baronet.
- Talbot County, Maryland, named for Grace, Lady Talbot (née Calvert), the wife of Sir Robert Talbot, 2nd Baronet and the sister of Cecil Calvert, 2nd Baron Baltimore.

== Saints ==
- St. Helena Parish, Louisiana, named for Saint Helena of Constantinople, the mother of Constantine the Great.
- St. Lucie County, Florida, named for the Spanish-era Ais town of Santa Lucea, presumed to have been named by the Spanish for Saint Lucie of Syracuse.
- Ste. Genevieve County, Missouri, named after Sainte Genevieve, the patron saint of Paris.
- Santa Barbara County, California, named for Saint Barbara, patroness of fire.
- Santa Clara County, California, named for Mission Santa Clara, which was in turn named for Saint Clara de Asís.

== Aspects of the Virgin Mary ==
- Assumption Parish, Louisiana, named for the Assumption of Mary into heaven.
- Dolores County, Colorado, named for the Dolores River, originally Rio de Nuestra Señora de los Dolores (River of our Lady of Sorrows).
- Guadalupe County, New Mexico, named for Our Lady of Guadalupe, the patron saint of the Americas.
- Los Angeles County, California, named for the fact that Gaspar de Portolà's explorers reached what was then the Native American village of Yangna on August 2, 1769, the feast day of Nuestra Señora la Reina de Los Angeles de Porciúncula (Our Lady the Queen of the Angels of Porciúncula).
- St. Mary's County, Maryland, and St. Mary Parish, Louisiana, named for the Blessed Virgin Mary, the mother of Jesus.

== Fictional ==
- Attala County, Mississippi, named for Attala or Atala, a fictional Native American heroine from a story by François-René de Chateaubriand.
- Evangeline Parish, Louisiana, named after the heroine of the poem Evangeline by Henry Wadsworth Longfellow.
- Leelanau County, Michigan, named after "Leelinau", a name given to Native American women in the stories of Henry Rowe Schoolcraft.

== Counties indirectly named for women ==
- Doña Ana County, New Mexico, named for its first county seat of Doña Ana, New Mexico, which in turn was named for Doña Ana Robledo, a 17th-century woman known for her charitable giving.
- Fluvanna County, Virginia, named for an archaic term for the James River, fluv. Anna or River of Anne.
- Haines Borough, Alaska, named after Haines, Alaska, which is named in turn for Mrs. F. E. Haines, the community leader who raised funds for a religious mission to the local Chilkat Native American tribe.
- Judith Basin County, Montana, named for the Judith River, which in turn is named for Julia Hancock, the sweetheart and future wife of William Clark of the Lewis and Clark Expedition, who explored the river; the misspelling is because Clark mistook her name to be Judith.
- Santa Rosa County, Florida, named for Santa Rosa Island, which in turn is named for Saint Rose of Viterbo, a Catholic saint who lived in the thirteenth century.

== Counties possibly named for women ==
- Culpeper County, Virginia, named for one of three members of the Colepeper family, of which two were women: Thomas Colepeper, 2nd Baron Colepeper of Thoresway, a colonial governor of Virginia; his first wife Margaretta van Hesse, called Margaret, Lady Colepeper; or their daughter, Thomas's heir and only surviving issue, Catherine Colepeper.
- Elmore County, Idaho, named for the Ida Elmore mines, which may have been named for a woman named Ida Elmore.
- Ida County, Iowa, possibly named for Ida Smith, the first European American child born in the county.
- Jessamine County, Kentucky, traditionally said to be named for Jessamine Douglas, the daughter of surveyor James Douglas. Local tradition claims that she was an early settler killed by Native Americans, but other accounts say that she died by suicide after an unhappy love affair. A Directory of United States Counties (2006) calls the story "baseless", saying that the county is named for the Jessamine Creek and the jasmine flowers that grow next to it.
- Louisa County, Iowa, named either for Louisa Massey of Dubuque, Iowa, who, according to legend, killed the murderer of her brother; or for Louisa County, Virginia.
- Maries County, Missouri, named for the Maries River, which may be named after one or more Maries; it could also be from French marais, "marsh."
- Montour County, Pennsylvania, named for the Métis interpreter John Montour, or possibly his mother Madame Montour.
- St. Clair County, Michigan, named either for Arthur St. Clair, the first governor of the Northwest Territory, or for Saint Clare of Assisi, on whose feast day Lake St. Clair was seen during an expedition led by René-Robert Cavelier, Sieur de La Salle.

== See also ==
- County (United States)
- Lists of U.S. county name etymologies
