= List of United States counties and county equivalents =

Map of the counties and county equivalents located in the 50 U.S. states and Washington, D.C.

There are 3,244 counties and county equivalents in the United States. (Note: At the time of the most recent (2020) census, 3,143 counties and equivalents were recorded in the 50 states and the District of Columbia, with another 100 county equivalents recorded in the territories (when the nine Minor Outlying Islands are included). Since that time, Connecticut's eight historical counties have been replaced with nine councils of government or “planning regions” which are considered by the United States Census Bureau as being county equivalents, resulting in a net gain of one county equivalent.) The 50 states of the United States are divided into 3,007 political subdivisions of states called counties. 237 other local governments and geographic places are also first-order administrative divisions of their respective state/district/territory, but are not called counties. The United States Census Bureau refers to the latter as county equivalents. The 237 county equivalents include the District of Columbia and 100 equivalents in U.S. territories (such as those in Puerto Rico). The vast majority of counties and equivalents had been organized by 1970. Since that time, most creations, boundary changes, and dissolutions have occurred in Alaska, Virginia, and Connecticut.

Among the 50 states, 44 are partitioned entirely into counties, with no county equivalents. Louisiana is instead divided into 64 equivalent parishes, while Alaska is divided into 19 equivalent boroughs and 11 sparsely populated census areas, the latter also known collectively as the unorganized borough. Virginia is composed of a mixture of 95 counties and 38 independent cities. Maryland, Missouri, and Nevada are each composed entirely of counties, except that each also has exactly one independent city: Baltimore, St. Louis, and Carson City, respectively. The District of Columbia is a single federal district that is not part of any state or county. All of the above 136 exceptional cases are reckoned as county equivalents. The number of counties (or equivalents) per state ranges from the three counties of Delaware to the 254 counties of Texas. In New England, where the town model predominates, several counties have no corresponding local governments, existing only as historical, legal, and census boundaries, such as the counties of Rhode Island, as well as eight of Massachusetts' 14 counties. On June 6, 2022, the U.S. Census Bureau formally recognized Connecticut's nine councils of government as county equivalents instead of the state's eight counties. Connecticut's eight historical counties continue to exist in name only and are no longer considered for statistical purposes. In total, the 50 states consist of 3,144 counties and equivalents.

Similarly, the Census Bureau treats 100 subdivisions of the territories of the United States as county equivalents. These are the 78 municipalities of Puerto Rico, the three major islands of the U.S. Virgin Islands, the three districts and two atolls of American Samoa, (Note: Locally, American Samoa is also subdivided into 15 places which are called counties, but they are not regarded as county equivalents by the Census Bureau. Instead, the Bureau treats five places — the three districts and two atolls — as county equivalents.) Guam as a single island and county equivalent, the four municipalities of the Northern Mariana Islands, and the nine island territories of the U.S. Minor Outlying Islands. As in the states, each territorial county equivalent has its own INCITS/FIPS codes.

== Table ==
The following table lists the 3,244 counties and county equivalents of the United States with the following information for each entity:

1. The county or equivalent
2. The state or equivalent (federal district or territory)
3. The population as of April 1, 2020, as enumerated by the US Census Bureau
4. The county's area in square miles
5. The county's date of foundation

3,244 counties and county equivalents of the United States (Note: They include 100 county equivalents in the U.S. territories.)
County or equivalent	ST	Population 2020	Area mi^{2}	Founded	Footnotes
Autauga	AL	58,805	594.44	21 Nov 1818	
Baldwin	AL	231,767	1589.78	21 Dec 1809	
Barbour	AL	25,223	884.88	18 Dec 1832	
Bibb	AL	22,293	622.58	7 Feb 1818	
Blount	AL	59,134	644.78	6 Feb 1818	
Bullock	AL	10,357	622.80	5 Dec 1866	
Butler	AL	19,051	776.83	13 Dec 1819	
Calhoun	AL	116,441	605.87	18 Dec 1832	
Chambers	AL	34,772	596.53	18 Dec 1832	
Cherokee	AL	24,971	553.70	9 Jan 1836	
Chilton	AL	45,014	692.85	30 Dec 1868	
Choctaw	AL	12,665	913.50	29 Dec 1847	
Clarke	AL	23,087	1238.46	10 Dec 1812	
Clay	AL	14,236	603.96	7 Dec 1866	
Cleburne	AL	15,056	560.10	6 Dec 1866	
Coffee	AL	53,465	678.97	29 Dec 1841	
Colbert	AL	57,227	592.62	6 Feb 1867	
Conecuh	AL	11,597	850.16	13 Feb 1818	
Coosa	AL	10,387	650.93	18 Dec 1832	
Covington	AL	37,570	1030.46	17 Dec 1821	
Crenshaw	AL	13,194	608.84	30 Nov 1866	
Cullman	AL	87,866	734.84	24 Jan 1877	
Dale	AL	49,326	561.15	22 Dec 1824	
Dallas	AL	38,462	978.69	9 Feb 1818	
DeKalb	AL	71,608	777.09	9 Jan 1836	
Elmore	AL	87,977	618.48	15 Feb 1866	
Escambia	AL	36,757	945.08	10 Dec 1868	
Etowah	AL	103,436	534.99	1 Dec 1868	
Fayette	AL	16,321	627.66	20 Dec 1824	
Franklin	AL	32,113	633.82	6 Feb 1818	
Geneva	AL	26,659	574.41	26 Dec 1868	
Greene	AL	7,730	647.11	13 Dec 1819	
Hale	AL	14,785	643.94	30 Jan 1867	
Henry	AL	17,146	561.75	13 Dec 1819	
Houston	AL	107,202	579.82	9 Feb 1903	
Jackson	AL	52,579	1077.87	13 Dec 1819	
Jefferson	AL	674,721	1111.28	13 Dec 1819	
Lamar	AL	13,972	604.85	8 Feb 1877	
Lauderdale	AL	93,564	667.70	6 Feb 1818	
Lawrence	AL	33,073	690.68	6 Feb 1818	
Lee	AL	174,241	607.54	5 Dec 1866	
Limestone	AL	103,570	559.94	6 Feb 1818	
Lowndes	AL	10,311	715.91	20 Jan 1830	
Macon	AL	19,532	608.89	18 Dec 1832	
Madison	AL	388,153	801.59	13 Dec 1808	
Marengo	AL	19,323	976.88	6 Feb 1818	
Marion	AL	29,341	742.29	13 Feb 1818	
Marshall	AL	97,612	565.84	9 Jan 1836	
Mobile	AL	414,809	1229.44	18 Dec 1812	
Monroe	AL	19,772	1025.67	29 Jun 1815	
Montgomery	AL	228,954	784.25	6 Dec 1816	
Morgan	AL	123,421	579.34	6 Feb 1818	
Perry	AL	8,511	719.66	13 Dec 1819	
Pickens	AL	19,123	881.41	20 Dec 1820	
Pike	AL	33,009	672.09	17 Dec 1821	
Randolph	AL	21,967	580.55	18 Dec 1832	
Russell	AL	59,183	641.14	18 Dec 1832	
Shelby	AL	223,024	784.93	7 Feb 1818	
St. Clair	AL	91,103	631.90	20 Nov 1818	
Sumter	AL	12,345	903.89	18 Dec 1832	
Talladega	AL	82,149	736.78	18 Dec 1832	
Tallapoosa	AL	41,311	716.52	18 Dec 1832	
Tuscaloosa	AL	227,036	1321.75	6 Feb 1818	
Walker	AL	65,342	791.19	26 Dec 1823	
Washington	AL	15,388	1080.21	4 Jun 1801	
Wilcox	AL	10,600	888.50	13 Dec 1819	
Winston	AL	23,540	612.98	12 Feb 1850	
Aleutians East	AK	3,420	6985	23 Oct 1987	(Note: One of the 19 organized boroughs of Alaska.)
Aleutians West	AK	5,232	4393	23 Oct 1987	(Note: One of the 11 census areas of the Unorganized Borough of Alaska.)
Anchorage	AK	291,247	1707	1 Jan 1964 (borough established)	(Note: The Municipality of Anchorage, Alaska has a fully consolidated city and borough government.)
Bethel	AK	18,666	40627	1980	
Bristol Bay	AK	844	482	2 Oct 1962	
Chugach	AK	7,102	9530	2 Jan 2019	
Copper River	AK	2,617	24692	2 Jan 2019	
Denali	AK	1,619	12641	7 Dec 1990	
Dillingham	AK	4,857	18334	1980	
Fairbanks North Star	AK	95,655	7335	1 Jan 1964	
Haines	AK	2,080	2343	29 Aug 1968	
Hoonah–Angoon	AK	2,365	6555	2007	
Juneau	AK	32,255	2704	30 Sep 1963	(Note: The City and Borough of Juneau, Alaska has a fully consolidated city and borough government.)
Kenai Peninsula	AK	58,799	16017	1 Jan 1964	
Ketchikan Gateway	AK	13,948	4857	6 Sep 1963	
Kodiak Island	AK	13,101	6689	24 Sep 1963	
Kusilvak	AK	8,368	17077	1980	
Lake and Peninsula	AK	1,476	23832	24 Apr 1989	
Matanuska-Susitna	AK	107,081	24707	1 Jan 1964	
Nome	AK	10,046	22969	1980	
North Slope	AK	11,031	88824	2 Jul 1972	
Northwest Arctic	AK	7,793	35663	2 Jun 1986	
Petersburg	AK	3,398	2901	3 Jan 2013	(Note: Established in 2013, Petersburg Borough is the newest county equivalent in the United States. The newest county is Broomfield County, Colorado, in 2001.)
Prince of Wales – Hyder	AK	5,753	5268	1 Jun 2008	
Sitka	AK	8,458	2870	24 Sep 1963	(Note: The City and Borough of Sitka, Alaska has a fully consolidated city and borough government.)
Skagway	AK	1,240	434	5 Jun 2007	
Southeast Fairbanks	AK	6,808	24831	1980	
Wrangell	AK	2,127	2556	30 May 2008	
Yakutat	AK	662	7623	22 Sep 1992	(Note: The City and Borough of Yakutat, Alaska has a fully consolidated city and borough government.)
Yukon–Koyukuk	AK	5,343	145576	1980	
Eastern District	AS	17,059	25.69		
Manu'a District	AS	832	22.29		
Rose Atoll (Rose Island)	AS	0	0.02		
Swains Island	AS	0	0.94		
Western District	AS	31,819	27.51		
Apache	AZ	66,021	11218	24 Feb 1879	
Cochise	AZ	125,447	6219	1 Feb 1881	
Coconino	AZ	145,101	18661	18 Feb 1891	
Gila	AZ	53,272	4796	8 Feb 1881	
Graham	AZ	38,533	4641	10 Mar 1881	
Greenlee	AZ	9,563	1848	10 Mar 1909	
La Paz	AZ	16,557	4513	1 Jan 1983	
Maricopa	AZ	4,420,568	9224	14 Feb 1871	
Mohave	AZ	213,267	13470	9 Nov 1864	
Navajo	AZ	106,717	9959	21 Mar 1895	
Pima	AZ	1,043,433	9189	9 Nov 1864	
Pinal	AZ	425,264	5374	1 Feb 1875	
Santa Cruz	AZ	47,669	1238	15 Mar 1899	
Yavapai	AZ	236,209	8128	9 Nov 1864	
Yuma	AZ	203,881	5519	9 Nov 1864	
Arkansas	AR	17,149	1033.79	13 Dec 1813	
Ashley	AR	19,062	939.08	30 Nov 1848	
Baxter	AR	41,627	586.74	24 Mar 1873	
Benton	AR	284,333	884.86	30 Sep 1836	
Boone	AR	37,373	601.82	9 Apr 1869	
Bradley	AR	10,545	654.38	18 Dec 1840	
Calhoun	AR	4,739	632.54	6 Dec 1850	
Carroll	AR	28,260	638.81	1 Nov 1833	
Chicot	AR	10,208	690.88	25 Oct 1823	
Clark	AR	21,446	882.60	15 Dec 1818	
Clay	AR	14,552	641.12	24 Mar 1873	
Cleburne	AR	24,711	591.91	20 Feb 1883	
Cleveland	AR	7,550	598.80	17 Apr 1873	
Columbia	AR	22,801	766.86	17 Dec 1852	
Conway	AR	20,715	566.66	20 Oct 1825	
Craighead	AR	111,231	712.98	19 Feb 1859	
Crawford	AR	60,133	604.20	18 Oct 1820	
Crittenden	AR	48,163	636.74	22 Oct 1825	
Cross	AR	16,833	622.33	15 Nov 1862	
Dallas	AR	6,482	668.16	1 Jan 1845	
Desha	AR	11,395	819.52	12 Dec 1838	
Drew	AR	17,350	835.65	26 Nov 1846	
Faulkner	AR	123,498	664.01	12 Apr 1873	
Franklin	AR	17,097	619.69	19 Dec 1837	
Fulton	AR	12,075	620.32	21 Dec 1842	
Garland	AR	100,180	734.57	5 Apr 1873	
Grant	AR	17,958	633.01	4 Feb 1869	
Greene	AR	45,736	579.65	5 Nov 1833	
Hempstead	AR	20,065	741.36	15 Dec 1818	
Hot Spring	AR	33,040	622.16	2 Nov 1829	
Howard	AR	12,785	595.20	17 Apr 1873	
Independence	AR	37,938	771.57	20 Oct 1820	
Izard	AR	13,577	584.02	27 Oct 1825	
Jackson	AR	16,755	641.45	5 Nov 1829	
Jefferson	AR	67,260	913.70	2 Nov 1829	
Johnson	AR	25,749	682.74	16 Nov 1833	
Lafayette	AR	6,308	545.07	15 Oct 1827	
Lawrence	AR	16,216	592.34	15 Jan 1815	
Lee	AR	8,600	619.47	17 Apr 1873	
Lincoln	AR	12,941	572.17	28 Mar 1871	
Little River	AR	12,026	564.87	5 Mar 1867	
Logan	AR	21,131	731.50	22 Mar 1871	
Lonoke	AR	74,015	802.43	16 Apr 1874	
Madison	AR	16,521	837.06	30 Sep 1836	
Marion	AR	16,826	640.39	25 Sep 1836	
Miller	AR	42,600	637.48	1 Apr 1820	
Mississippi	AR	40,685	919.73	1 Nov 1833	
Monroe	AR	6,799	621.41	2 Nov 1829	
Montgomery	AR	8,484	800.29	9 Dec 1842	
Nevada	AR	8,310	620.78	20 Mar 1871	
Newton	AR	7,225	823.18	14 Dec 1842	
Ouachita	AR	22,650	739.63	29 Nov 1842	
Perry	AR	10,019	560.47	18 Dec 1840	
Phillips	AR	16,568	727.29	1 May 1820	
Pike	AR	10,171	613.88	1 Nov 1833	
Poinsett	AR	22,965	763.39	28 Feb 1838	
Polk	AR	19,221	862.42	30 Nov 1844	
Pope	AR	63,381	830.79	2 Nov 1829	
Prairie	AR	8,282	675.76	25 Nov 1846	
Pulaski	AR	399,125	807.84	15 Dec 1818	
Randolph	AR	18,571	656.04	29 Oct 1835	
St. Francis	AR	23,090	642.40	13 Oct 1827	
Saline	AR	123,416	730.46	2 Nov 1835	
Scott	AR	9,836	898.09	5 Nov 1833	
Searcy	AR	7,828	668.51	13 Dec 1838	
Sebastian	AR	127,799	546.04	6 Jan 1851	
Sevier	AR	15,839	581.35	17 Oct 1828	
Sharp	AR	17,271	606.35	18 Jul 1868	
Stone	AR	12,359	609.43	21 Apr 1873	
Union	AR	39,054	1055.27	2 Nov 1829	
Van Buren	AR	15,796	724.32	11 Nov 1833	
Washington	AR	245,871	951.72	17 Oct 1828	
White	AR	76,822	1042.36	23 Oct 1835	
Woodruff	AR	6,269	594.05	26 Nov 1862	
Yell	AR	20,263	948.84	5 Dec 1840	
Alameda	CA	1,682,353	738	25 Mar 1853	
Alpine	CA	1,204	739	16 Mar 1864	
Amador	CA	40,474	606	1 May 1854	
Butte	CA	211,632	1640	18 Feb 1850	
Calaveras	CA	45,292	1020	18 Feb 1850	
Colusa	CA	21,839	1151	18 Feb 1850	
Contra Costa	CA	1,165,927	720	18 Feb 1850	
Del Norte	CA	27,743	1008	2 Mar 1857	
El Dorado	CA	191,185	1712	18 Feb 1850	
Fresno	CA	1,008,654	5963	19 Apr 1856	
Glenn	CA	28,917	1315	5 Mar 1891	
Humboldt	CA	136,463	3573	12 May 1853	
Imperial	CA	179,702	4175	7 Aug 1907	
Inyo	CA	19,016	10192	22 Mar 1866	
Kern	CA	909,235	8142	2 Apr 1866	
Kings	CA	152,486	1390	22 Mar 1893	
Lake	CA	68,163	1258	20 May 1861	
Lassen	CA	32,730	4558	1 Apr 1864	
Los Angeles	CA	10,014,009	4060	18 Feb 1850	
Madera	CA	156,255	2138	16 May 1893	
Marin	CA	262,321	520	18 Feb 1850	
Mariposa	CA	17,131	1451	18 Feb 1850	
Mendocino	CA	91,601	3509	18 Feb 1850	
Merced	CA	281,202	1929	19 Apr 1855	
Modoc	CA	8,700	3944	17 Feb 1874	
Mono	CA	13,195	3044	21 Apr 1861	
Monterey	CA	439,035	3322	18 Feb 1850	
Napa	CA	138,019	754	18 Feb 1850	
Nevada	CA	102,241	958	25 Apr 1851	
Orange	CA	3,186,989	948	1 Aug 1889	
Placer	CA	404,739	1407	25 Apr 1851	
Plumas	CA	19,790	2554	18 Mar 1854	
Riverside	CA	2,418,185	7208	9 May 1893	
Sacramento	CA	1,585,055	966	18 Feb 1850	
San Benito	CA	64,209	1389	12 Feb 1874	
San Bernardino	CA	2,181,654	20062	26 Apr 1853	
San Diego	CA	3,298,634	4204	18 Feb 1850	
San Francisco	CA	873,965	47	16 Dec 1848	(Note: The City and County of San Francisco, California has a fully consolidated city and county government.)
San Joaquin	CA	779,233	1399	18 Feb 1850	
San Luis Obispo	CA	282,424	3304	18 Feb 1850	
San Mateo	CA	764,442	449	19 Apr 1856	
Santa Barbara	CA	448,229	2738	18 Feb 1850	
Santa Clara	CA	1,936,259	1291	18 Feb 1850	
Santa Cruz	CA	270,861	446	18 Feb 1850	
Shasta	CA	182,155	3786	18 Feb 1850	
Sierra	CA	3,236	953	16 Apr 1852	
Siskiyou	CA	44,076	6287	22 Mar 1852	
Solano	CA	453,491	828	18 Feb 1850	
Sonoma	CA	488,863	1576	18 Feb 1850	
Stanislaus	CA	552,878	1495	1 Apr 1854	
Sutter	CA	99,633	603	18 Feb 1850	
Tehama	CA	65,829	2951	9 Apr 1856	
Trinity	CA	16,112	3179	18 Feb 1850	
Tulare	CA	473,117	4824	10 Jul 1852	
Tuolumne	CA	55,620	2236	15 Feb 1850	
Ventura	CA	843,843	1846	22 Mar 1872	
Yolo	CA	216,403	1012	18 Feb 1850	
Yuba	CA	81,575	630	18 Feb 1850	
Adams	CO	519,572	1182.29	15 Apr 1901	
Alamosa	CO	16,376	723.21	8 Mar 1913	
Arapahoe	CO	655,070	804.41	1 Nov 1861	
Archuleta	CO	13,359	1354.53	14 Apr 1885	
Baca	CO	3,506	2558.48	16 Apr 1889	
Bent	CO	5,650	1541.07	6 Feb 1874	
Boulder	CO	330,758	740.48	1 Nov 1861	
Broomfield	CO	74,112	33.57	6 Jun 1961	(Note: The City and County of Broomfield, Colorado has a fully consolidated city and county government. Established in 2001, Broomfield is the newest county in the United States. However, it was founded in 1861. The newest county equivalent is Petersburg Borough, Alaska, formed in 2013.)
Chaffee	CO	19,476	1014.12	10 Feb 1879	
Cheyenne	CO	1,748	1781.90	25 Mar 1889	
Clear Creek	CO	9,397	396.53	1 Nov 1861	
Conejos	CO	7,461	1290.22	1 Nov 1861	
Costilla	CO	3,499	1229.38	1 Nov 1861	
Crowley	CO	5,922	800.27	29 May 1911	
Custer	CO	4,704	739.24	9 Mar 1877	
Delta	CO	31,196	1149.44	11 Feb 1883	
Denver	CO	715,522	155.66	17 Nov 1856	(Note: The City and County of Denver, Colorado has a fully consolidated city and county government.)
Dolores	CO	2,326	1076.93	19 Feb 1881	
Douglas	CO	357,978	842.30	1 Nov 1861	
Eagle	CO	55,731	1700.76	11 Feb 1883	
El Paso	CO	730,395	2128.60	1 Nov 1861	
Elbert	CO	26,062	1849.08	2 Feb 1874	
Fremont	CO	48,939	1533.09	1 Nov 1861	
Garfield	CO	61,685	2958.23	10 Feb 1883	
Gilpin	CO	5,808	150.15	1 Nov 1861	
Grand	CO	15,717	1868.53	2 Feb 1874	
Gunnison	CO	16,918	3259.22	9 Mar 1877	
Hinsdale	CO	788	1123.35	10 Feb 1874	
Huerfano	CO	6,820	1592.37	1 Nov 1861	
Jackson	CO	1,379	1619.75	5 May 1909	
Jefferson	CO	582,910	772.85	1 Nov 1861	
Kiowa	CO	1,446	1785.90	11 Apr 1889	
Kit Carson	CO	7,087	2162.43	11 Apr 1889	
La Plata	CO	55,638	1700.44	10 Feb 1874	
Lake	CO	7,436	383.55	1 Nov 1861	
Larimer	CO	359,066	2631.75	1 Nov 1861	
Las Animas	CO	14,555	4773.27	9 Feb 1866	
Lincoln	CO	5,675	2585.21	11 Apr 1889	
Logan	CO	21,528	1845.31	25 Feb 1887	
Mesa	CO	155,703	3345.69	14 Feb 1883	
Mineral	CO	865	878.16	27 Mar 1893	
Moffat	CO	13,292	4755.86	27 Feb 1911	
Montezuma	CO	25,849	2035.80	16 Apr 1889	
Montrose	CO	42,679	2246.43	11 Feb 1883	
Morgan	CO	29,111	1293.83	19 Feb 1889	
Otero	CO	18,690	1267.66	25 Mar 1889	
Ouray	CO	4,874	542.30	18 Jan 1877	
Park	CO	17,390	2209.36	1 Nov 1861	
Phillips	CO	4,530	668.30	27 Mar 1889	
Pitkin	CO	17,358	970.37	23 Feb 1881	
Prowers	CO	11,999	1645.37	11 Apr 1889	
Pueblo	CO	168,162	2396.77	1 Nov 1861	
Rio Blanco	CO	6,529	3226.24	25 Mar 1889	
Rio Grande	CO	11,539	913.10	10 Feb 1874	
Routt	CO	24,829	2362.11	29 Jan 1877	
Saguache	CO	6,368	3168.32	29 Dec 1866	
San Juan	CO	705	388.99	31 Jan 1876	
San Miguel	CO	8,072	1290.76	2 Mar 1883	
Sedgwick	CO	2,404	548.83	9 Apr 1889	
Summit	CO	31,055	618.92	1 Nov 1861	
Teller	CO	24,710	558.58	23 Mar 1899	
Washington	CO	4,817	2522.90	9 Feb 1887	
Weld	CO	328,981	4013.84	3 Nov 1861	
Yuma	CO	9,988	2369.61	15 Mar 1889	
Capitol	CT	976,248	1046.08	2013	(Note: One of Connecticut's nine councils of government, which on June 6, 2022, the U.S. Census Bureau formally recognized as county equivalents.)
Fairfield	CT	959,768	837.21	1666	(Note: One of Connecticut's eight historical counties, which continue to exist in name only. They were included in the 2020 U.S. Census, but since June 6, 2022, the U.S. Census Bureau no longer considers them for statistical purposes.)
Greater Bridgeport	CT	325,778	149.08	2013	
Hartford	CT	899,498	750.19	10 May 1666	
Litchfield	CT	185,186	945.24	1751	
Lower Connecticut River Valley	CT	174,225	461.57	2013	
Middlesex	CT	164,245	439.11	May 1785	
Naugatuck Valley	CT	450,376	421.84	2013	
New Haven	CT	864,835	862.22	1666	
New London	CT	268,555	772.20	1646	
Northeastern Connecticut	CT	95,348	563.2	2013	
Northwest Hills	CT	112,503	808.27	2013	
South Central Connecticut	CT	570,487	387.04	2013	
Southeastern Connecticut	CT	280,430	662.64	1992	
Tolland	CT	149,788	417.10	1785	
Western Connecticut	CT	620,549	618.71	2013	
Windham	CT	116,418	521.13	12 May 1726	
Kent	DE	181,851	800	8 Aug 1683	
New Castle	DE	570,719	494	8 Aug 1673	
Sussex	DE	237,378	1196	8 Aug 1683	
District of Columbia	DC	689,545	68.34	21 Feb 1871 (DC Organic Act of 1871 signed into law)	(Note: The United States Census Bureau and the Office of Management and Budget treat the District of Columbia as a single county equivalent.)
Alachua	FL	278,468	874	29 Dec 1824	
Baker	FL	28,259	585	8 Feb 1861	
Bay	FL	175,216	764	24 Apr 1913	
Bradford	FL	28,303	293	31 Dec 1858	
Brevard	FL	606,612	1018	14 Mar 1844	
Broward	FL	1,944,375	1209	30 Apr 1915	
Calhoun	FL	13,648	567	26 Jan 1838	
Charlotte	FL	186,847	694	23 Apr 1921	
Citrus	FL	153,843	584	2 Jun 1887	
Clay	FL	218,245	601	31 Dec 1858	
Collier	FL	375,752	2026	8 May 1923	
Columbia	FL	69,698	797	4 Feb 1832	
DeSoto	FL	33,976	637	19 May 1887	
Dixie	FL	16,759	704	25 Apr 1921	
Duval	FL	995,567	774	12 Aug 1822	
Escambia	FL	321,905	664	21 Jul 1821	
Flagler	FL	115,378	485	28 Apr 1917	
Franklin	FL	12,451	534	8 Feb 1832	
Gadsden	FL	43,826	516	24 Jun 1823	
Gilchrist	FL	17,864	349	4 Dec 1925	
Glades	FL	12,126	774	23 Apr 1921	
Gulf	FL	14,192	565	6 Jun 1925	
Hamilton	FL	14,004	515	26 Dec 1827	
Hardee	FL	25,327	637	23 Apr 1921	
Hendry	FL	39,619	1153	11 May 1923	
Hernando	FL	194,515	478	24 Feb 1843	
Highlands	FL	101,235	1028	23 Apr 1921	
Hillsborough	FL	1,459,762	1051	25 Jan 1834	
Holmes	FL	19,653	482	8 Jan 1848	
Indian River	FL	159,788	503	30 May 1925	
Jackson	FL	47,319	916	12 Aug 1822	
Jefferson	FL	14,510	598	20 Jan 1827	
Lafayette	FL	8,226	543	23 Dec 1853	
Lake	FL	383,956	953	27 May 1887	
Lee	FL	760,822	804	13 May 1887	
Leon	FL	292,198	667	29 Dec 1824	
Levy	FL	42,915	1118	10 Mar 1845	
Liberty	FL	7,974	836	15 Dec 1855	
Madison	FL	17,968	692	26 Dec 1827	
Manatee	FL	399,710	741	9 Jan 1855	
Marion	FL	375,908	1579	14 Mar 1844	
Martin	FL	158,431	556	30 May 1925	
Miami-Dade	FL	2,701,767	1946	4 Feb 1836	
Monroe	FL	82,874	997	3 Jul 1823	
Nassau	FL	90,352	652	29 Dec 1824	
Okaloosa	FL	211,668	936	7 Sep 1915	
Okeechobee	FL	39,644	774	8 May 1917	
Orange	FL	1,429,908	908	29 Dec 1824	
Osceola	FL	388,656	1322	12 May 1887	
Palm Beach	FL	1,492,191	2034	30 Apr 1909	
Pasco	FL	561,891	745	2 Jun 1887	
Pinellas	FL	959,107	280	1 Jan 1912	
Polk	FL	725,046	1875	8 Feb 1861	
Putnam	FL	73,321	722	18 Jan 1849	
St. Johns	FL	273,425	609	21 Jul 1821	
St. Lucie	FL	329,226	572	24 May 1905	
Santa Rosa	FL	188,000	1016	18 Feb 1842	
Sarasota	FL	434,006	572	14 May 1921	
Seminole	FL	470,856	308	25 Apr 1913	
Sumter	FL	129,752	546	8 Jan 1853	
Suwannee	FL	43,474	688	21 Dec 1858	
Taylor	FL	21,796	1042	23 Dec 1856	
Union	FL	16,147	240	20 May 1921	
Volusia	FL	553,543	1106	29 Dec 1854	
Wakulla	FL	33,764	607	11 Mar 1843	
Walton	FL	75,305	1058	29 Dec 1824	
Washington	FL	25,318	580	9 Dec 1825	
Appling	GA	18,444	509	15 Dec 1818	
Atkinson	GA	8,286	338	15 Aug 1917	
Bacon	GA	11,140	285	27 Jul 1914	
Baker	GA	2,876	343	12 Dec 1825	
Baldwin	GA	43,799	258	11 May 1803	
Banks	GA	18,035	234	1 Feb 1859	
Barrow	GA	83,505	162	7 Jul 1914	
Bartow	GA	108,901	460	3 Dec 1832	
Ben Hill	GA	17,194	252	1906	
Berrien	GA	18,160	452	25 Feb 1856	
Bibb	GA	157,346	250	9 Dec 1822	
Bleckley	GA	12,583	217	5 Nov 1912	
Brantley	GA	18,021	444	2 Nov 1920	
Brooks	GA	16,301	494	11 Dec 1858	
Bryan	GA	44,738	442	19 Dec 1793	
Bulloch	GA	81,099	683	8 Feb 1796	
Burke	GA	24,596	831	5 Feb 1777	
Butts	GA	25,434	187	24 Dec 1825	
Calhoun	GA	5,573	280	20 Feb 1854	
Camden	GA	54,768	630	5 Feb 1777	
Candler	GA	10,981	247	1914	
Carroll	GA	119,148	499	9 Jun 1826	
Catoosa	GA	67,872	162	5 Dec 1853	
Charlton	GA	12,518	781	18 Feb 1854	
Chatham	GA	295,291	440	5 Feb 1777	
Chattahoochee	GA	9,565	249	13 Feb 1854	
Chattooga	GA	24,965	314	28 Dec 1838	
Cherokee	GA	266,620	424	26 Dec 1831	
Clarke	GA	128,671	121	5 Dec 1801	
Clay	GA	2,848	195	16 Feb 1854	
Clayton	GA	297,595	195	30 Nov 1858	
Clinch	GA	6,749	809	14 Feb 1850	
Cobb	GA	766,149	340	2 Dec 1832	
Coffee	GA	43,092	599	9 Feb 1854	
Colquitt	GA	45,898	552	25 Feb 1856	
Columbia	GA	156,010	290	10 Dec 1790	
Cook	GA	17,229	229	5 Nov 1918	
Coweta	GA	146,158	443	9 Jun 1826	
Crawford	GA	12,130	325	9 Dec 1822	
Crisp	GA	20,128	274	17 Aug 1905	
Dade	GA	16,251	174	1837	
Dawson	GA	26,798	211	3 Dec 1857	
Decatur	GA	29,367	597	8 Dec 1823	
DeKalb	GA	764,382	268	9 Dec 1822	
Dodge	GA	19,925	501	26 Oct 1870	
Dooly	GA	11,208	393	15 May 1821	
Dougherty	GA	85,790	330	15 Dec 1853	
Douglas	GA	144,237	199	1 Oct 1870	
Early	GA	10,854	511	15 Dec 1818	
Echols	GA	3,697	404	13 Dec 1858	
Effingham	GA	64,769	480	5 Feb 1777	
Elbert	GA	19,637	369	10 Dec 1790	
Emanuel	GA	22,768	686	10 Dec 1812	
Evans	GA	10,774	185	3 Nov 1914	
Fannin	GA	25,319	386	12 Jan 1854	
Fayette	GA	119,194	197	15 May 1821	
Floyd	GA	98,584	513	3 Dec 1832	
Forsyth	GA	251,283	226	3 Dec 1831	
Franklin	GA	23,424	263	25 Feb 1784	
Fulton	GA	1,066,710	529	20 Dec 1853	
Gilmer	GA	31,353	427	3 Dec 1832	
Glascock	GA	2,884	144	19 Dec 1857	
Glynn	GA	84,499	422	5 Feb 1777	
Gordon	GA	57,544	355	13 Feb 1850	
Grady	GA	26,236	458	17 Aug 1905	
Greene	GA	18,915	388	3 Feb 1786	
Gwinnett	GA	957,062	433	15 Dec 1818	
Habersham	GA	46,031	278	15 Dec 1818	
Hall	GA	203,136	394	15 Dec 1818	
Hancock	GA	8,735	473	17 Dec 1793	
Haralson	GA	29,919	282	26 Jan 1856	
Harris	GA	34,668	464	14 Dec 1827	
Hart	GA	25,828	232	7 Dec 1853	
Heard	GA	11,412	296	22 Dec 1830	
Henry	GA	240,712	323	15 May 1821	
Houston	GA	163,633	377	15 May 1821	
Irwin	GA	9,666	357	15 Dec 1818	
Jackson	GA	75,907	342	11 Feb 1796	
Jasper	GA	14,588	370	10 Dec 1807	
Jeff Davis	GA	14,779	333	18 Aug 1905	
Jefferson	GA	15,709	528	20 Feb 1796	
Jenkins	GA	8,674	350	17 Aug 1905	
Johnson	GA	9,189	304	11 Dec 1858	
Jones	GA	28,347	394	10 Dec 1807	
Lamar	GA	18,500	185	2 Nov 1920	
Lanier	GA	9,877	187	7 Aug 1920	
Laurens	GA	49,570	813	10 Dec 1807	
Lee	GA	33,163	356	9 Jun 1825	
Liberty	GA	65,256	519	5 Feb 1777	
Lincoln	GA	7,690	211	20 Feb 1796	
Long	GA	16,168	401	2 Nov 1920	
Lowndes	GA	118,251	504	23 Dec 1825	
Lumpkin	GA	33,488	284	3 Dec 1832	
Macon	GA	12,082	367	14 Dec 1837	
Madison	GA	30,120	260	5 Dec 1811	
Marion	GA	7,498	434	14 Dec 1827	
McDuffie	GA	21,632	403	18 Oct 1870	
McIntosh	GA	10,975	427	1793	
Meriwether	GA	20,613	503	14 Dec 1827	
Miller	GA	6,000	283	26 Feb 1856	
Mitchell	GA	21,755	512	21 Dec 1857	
Monroe	GA	27,957	396	15 May 1821	
Montgomery	GA	8,610	245	19 Dec 1793	
Morgan	GA	20,097	350	10 Dec 1807	
Murray	GA	39,973	344	Dec 1832	
Muscogee	GA	206,922	216	9 Jun 1826	
Newton	GA	112,483	276	24 Dec 1821	
Oconee	GA	41,799	186	24 Feb 1875	
Oglethorpe	GA	14,825	441	19 Dec 1795	
Paulding	GA	168,661	314	3 Dec 1832	
Peach	GA	27,981	151	18 Jul 1924	
Pickens	GA	33,216	232	5 Dec 1853	
Pierce	GA	19,716	343	18 Dec 1857	
Pike	GA	18,889	218	1822	
Polk	GA	42,853	311	20 Dec 1851	
Pulaski	GA	9,855	247	13 Dec 1808	
Putnam	GA	22,047	344	10 Dec 1807	
Quitman	GA	2,235	152	10 Dec 1858	
Rabun	GA	16,883	371	21 Dec 1819	
Randolph	GA	6,425	429	20 Dec 1828	
Richmond	GA	206,607	324	5 Feb 1777	
Rockdale	GA	93,570	131	18 Oct 1870	
Schley	GA	4,547	168	22 Dec 1857	
Screven	GA	14,067	648	14 Dec 1793	
Seminole	GA	9,147	238	2 Nov 1920	
Spalding	GA	67,306	198	20 Dec 1851	
Stephens	GA	26,784	179	18 Aug 1905	
Stewart	GA	5,314	459	23 Dec 1830	
Sumter	GA	29,616	485	26 Dec 1831	
Talbot	GA	5,733	393	14 Dec 1827	
Taliaferro	GA	1,559	195	24 Dec 1825	
Tattnall	GA	22,842	484	5 Dec 1801	
Taylor	GA	7,816	378	15 Jan 1852	
Telfair	GA	12,477	441	10 Dec 1807	
Terrell	GA	9,185	336	16 Feb 1856	
Thomas	GA	45,798	548	23 Dec 1825	
Tift	GA	41,344	265	17 Aug 1905	
Toombs	GA	27,030	367	18 Aug 1905	
Towns	GA	12,493	166	6 Mar 1856	
Treutlen	GA	6,406	201	5 Nov 1918	
Troup	GA	69,426	414	9 Jun 1826	
Turner	GA	9,006	286	18 Aug 1905	
Twiggs	GA	8,022	360	14 Dec 1809	
Union	GA	24,632	323	3 Dec 1832	
Upson	GA	27,700	326	15 Dec 1824	
Walker	GA	67,654	446	18 Dec 1833	
Walton	GA	96,673	329	22 Dec 1818	
Ware	GA	36,251	903	15 Dec 1824	
Warren	GA	5,215	286	19 Dec 1793	
Washington	GA	19,988	680	25 Feb 1784	
Wayne	GA	30,144	645	7 Dec 1803	
Webster	GA	2,348	210	16 Dec 1853	
Wheeler	GA	7,471	298	5 Nov 1912	
White	GA	28,003	242	22 Dec 1857	
Whitfield	GA	102,864	290	30 Dec 1851	
Wilcox	GA	8,766	380	22 Dec 1857	
Wilkes	GA	9,565	471	5 Feb 1777	
Wilkinson	GA	8,877	447	11 May 1803	
Worth	GA	20,784	570	20 Dec 1853	
Guam	GU	162,742	210		
Hawaii	HI	200,629	4028	13 Apr 1905	(Note: The dates retrieved were from Newberry)
Honolulu	HI	1,016,508	597	30 Apr 1907	(Note: The City and County of Honolulu, Hawaii has a county government with municipal functions.)
Kalawao	HI	82	5.2	22 Apr 1903	
Kauaʻi	HI	73,298	622	22 Apr 1903	
Maui	HI	164,754	1120	22 Apr 1903	
Ada	ID	494,967	1055	22 Dec 1864	
Adams	ID	4,379	1365	3 Mar 1911	
Bannock	ID	87,018	1113	6 Mar 1893	
Bear Lake	ID	6,372	971	5 Jan 1875	
Benewah	ID	9,530	776	23 Jan 1915	
Bingham	ID	47,992	2095	13 Jan 1885	
Blaine	ID	24,272	2645	5 Mar 1895	
Boise	ID	7,610	1902	4 Feb 1864	
Bonner	ID	47,110	1738	21 Feb 1907	
Bonneville	ID	123,964	1869	7 Feb 1911	
Boundary	ID	12,056	1269	23 Jan 1915	
Butte	ID	2,574	2233	6 Feb 1917	
Camas	ID	1,077	1077	6 Feb 1917	
Canyon	ID	231,105	590	7 Mar 1891	
Caribou	ID	7,027	1766	11 Feb 1919	
Cassia	ID	24,655	2567	20 Feb 1879	
Clark	ID	790	1765	1 Feb 1919	
Clearwater	ID	8,734	2462	27 Feb 1911	
Custer	ID	4,275	4926	8 Jan 1881	
Elmore	ID	28,666	3078	7 Feb 1889	
Franklin	ID	14,194	666	20 Jan 1913	
Fremont	ID	13,388	1867	4 Mar 1893	
Gem	ID	19,123	563	15 Mar 1915	
Gooding	ID	15,598	731	28 Jan 1913	
Idaho	ID	16,541	8485	20 Dec 1861	
Jefferson	ID	30,891	1095	18 Feb 1913	
Jerome	ID	24,237	600	8 Feb 1919	
Kootenai	ID	171,362	1245	22 Dec 1864	
Latah	ID	39,517	1077	14 May 1888	
Lemhi	ID	7,974	4564	9 Jan 1869	
Lewis	ID	3,533	479	3 Mar 1911	
Lincoln	ID	5,127	1206	18 Mar 1895	
Madison	ID	52,913	472	18 Feb 1913	
Minidoka	ID	21,613	760	28 Jan 1913	
Nez Perce	ID	42,090	849	4 Feb 1864	
Oneida	ID	4,564	1200	22 Jan 1864	
Owyhee	ID	11,913	7678	31 Dec 1863	
Payette	ID	25,386	408	28 Feb 1917	
Power	ID	7,878	1406	30 Jan 1913	
Shoshone	ID	13,169	2634	4 Feb 1864	
Teton	ID	11,630	450	26 Jan 1915	
Twin Falls	ID	90,046	1925	21 Feb 1907	
Valley	ID	11,746	3733	26 Feb 1917	
Washington	ID	10,500	1456	20 Feb 1879	
Adams	IL	65,737	855		
Alexander	IL	5,240	236		
Bond	IL	16,725	380		
Boone	IL	53,448	280		
Brown	IL	6,244	305		
Bureau	IL	33,244	869		
Calhoun	IL	4,437	253		
Carroll	IL	15,702	445		
Cass	IL	13,042	375		
Champaign	IL	205,865	996		
Christian	IL	34,032	709		
Clark	IL	15,455	501		
Clay	IL	13,288	468		
Clinton	IL	36,899	474		
Coles	IL	46,863	508		
Cook	IL	5,275,541	944	15 Jan 1831	
Crawford	IL	18,679	443		
Cumberland	IL	10,450	345		
DeKalb	IL	100,420	631		
DeWitt	IL	15,516	397		
Douglas	IL	19,740	416		
DuPage	IL	932,877	327		
Edgar	IL	16,866	623		
Edwards	IL	6,245	222		
Effingham	IL	34,668	478		
Fayette	IL	21,488	716		
Ford	IL	13,534	485		
Franklin	IL	37,804	408		
Fulton	IL	33,609	865		
Gallatin	IL	4,946	322		
Greene	IL	11,985	543		
Grundy	IL	52,533	418		
Hamilton	IL	7,993	434		
Hancock	IL	17,620	793		
Hardin	IL	3,649	177		
Henderson	IL	6,387	378		
Henry	IL	49,284	822		
Iroquois	IL	27,077	1117		
Jackson	IL	52,974	584		
Jasper	IL	9,287	494		
Jefferson	IL	37,113	571		
Jersey	IL	21,512	369		
Jo Daviess	IL	22,035	600		
Johnson	IL	13,308	343		
Kane	IL	516,522	519		
Kankakee	IL	107,502	676		
Kendall	IL	131,869	320		
Knox	IL	49,967	716		
Lake	IL	714,342	443		
LaSalle	IL	109,658	1135		
Lawrence	IL	15,280	372		
Lee	IL	34,145	724		
Livingston	IL	35,815	1043		
Logan	IL	27,987	618		
Macon	IL	103,998	572		
Macoupin	IL	44,967	863		
Madison	IL	265,859	539		
Marion	IL	37,729	575		
Marshall	IL	11,742	589		
Mason	IL	13,086	603		
Massac	IL	14,169	242		
McDonough	IL	27,238	580		
McHenry	IL	310,229	862		
McLean	IL	170,954	1186		
Menard	IL	12,297	314		
Mercer	IL	15,699	561		
Monroe	IL	34,962	385		
Montgomery	IL	28,288	703		
Morgan	IL	32,915	568		
Moultrie	IL	14,526	335		
Ogle	IL	51,788	758		
Peoria	IL	181,830	618		
Perry	IL	20,945	441		
Piatt	IL	16,673	439		
Pike	IL	14,739	831		
Pope	IL	3,763	368		
Pulaski	IL	5,193	199		
Putnam	IL	5,637	160		
Randolph	IL	30,163	575		
Richland	IL	15,813	360		
Rock Island	IL	144,672	427		
St. Clair	IL	257,400	674		
Saline	IL	23,768	868		
Sangamon	IL	196,343	437		
Schuyler	IL	6,902	438		
Scott	IL	4,949	758		
Shelby	IL	20,990	657		
Stark	IL	5,400	288		
Stephenson	IL	44,630	564		
Tazewell	IL	131,343	646		
Union	IL	17,244	413		
Vermilion	IL	74,188	898		
Wabash	IL	11,361	223		
Warren	IL	16,835	542		
Washington	IL	13,761	562		
Wayne	IL	16,179	713		
White	IL	13,877	494		
Whiteside	IL	55,691	684		
Will	IL	696,355	835		
Williamson	IL	67,153	420		
Winnebago	IL	285,350	513		
Woodford	IL	38,467	527		
Adams	IN	35,809	339	1 Mar 1836	
Allen	IN	385,410	657	1 Apr 1824	
Bartholomew	IN	82,208	407	12 Feb 1821	
Benton	IN	8,719	406	18 Feb 1840	
Blackford	IN	12,112	165	2 Apr 1838	
Boone	IN	70,812	423	1 Apr 1830	
Brown	IN	15,475	312	4 Feb 1836	
Carroll	IN	20,306	372	17 Jan 1828	
Cass	IN	37,870	412	18 Dec 1828	
Clark	IN	121,093	373	3 Feb 1801	
Clay	IN	26,466	358	12 Feb 1825	
Clinton	IN	33,190	405	1 Mar 1830	
Crawford	IN	10,526	306	5 Jan 1818	
Daviess	IN	33,381	429	2 Feb 1818	
Dearborn	IN	50,679	305	7 Mar 1803	
Decatur	IN	26,472	373	12 Dec 1821	
DeKalb	IN	43,265	363	7 Feb 1835	
Delaware	IN	111,903	392	Jan 1820	
Dubois	IN	43,637	427	20 Dec 1818	
Elkhart	IN	207,047	463	1 Apr 1830	
Fayette	IN	23,398	215	Jan 29 1818	
Floyd	IN	80,484	148	4 Mar 1819	
Fountain	IN	16,479	396	1 Apr 1826	
Franklin	IN	22,785	384	1 Feb 1811	
Fulton	IN	20,480	368	7 Feb 1836	
Gibson	IN	33,011	487	1 Apr 1813	
Grant	IN	66,674	414	10 Feb 1831	
Greene	IN	30,803	543	5 Jan 1821	
Hamilton	IN	347,467	394	8 Jan 1823	
Hancock	IN	79,840	306	1 Mar 1828	
Harrison	IN	39,654	485	1 Dec 1808	
Hendricks	IN	174,788	407	20 Dec 1823	
Henry	IN	48,914	392	31 Dec 1821	
Howard	IN	83,658	293	15 Jan 1844	
Huntington	IN	36,662	383	2 Feb 1832	
Jackson	IN	46,428	509	1 Jan 1816	
Jasper	IN	32,918	560	7 Feb 1835	
Jay	IN	20,478	384	7 Feb 1835	
Jefferson	IN	33,147	361	1 Feb 1811	
Jennings	IN	27,613	377	27 Dec 1816	
Johnson	IN	161,765	320	31 Dec 1823	
Knox	IN	36,282	516	6 Jun 1790	
Kosciusko	IN	80,240	531	7 Feb 1835	
LaGrange	IN	40,446	380	2 Feb 1832	
Lake	IN	498,700	499	16 Feb 1837	
LaPorte	IN	112,417	598	1 Apr 1832	
Lawrence	IN	45,011	449	7 Jan 1818	
Madison	IN	130,129	452	4 Jan 1823	
Marion	IN	977,203	396	1 Apr 1822	
Marshall	IN	46,095	444	7 Feb 1835	
Martin	IN	9,812	336	20 Jan 1820	
Miami	IN	35,962	374	30 Jan 1833	
Monroe	IN	139,718	395	14 Jan 1818	
Montgomery	IN	37,936	505	21 Dec 1822	
Morgan	IN	71,780	404	15 Feb 1822	
Newton	IN	13,830	402	8 Dec 1859	
Noble	IN	47,457	411	7 Feb 1835	
Ohio	IN	5,940	86	4 Jan 1844	
Orange	IN	19,867	398	26 Dec 1815	
Owen	IN	21,321	385	21 Dec 1818	
Parke	IN	16,156	445	9 Jan 1821	
Perry	IN	19,170	382	1 Nov 1814	
Pike	IN	12,250	334	21 Dec 1816	
Porter	IN	173,215	418	7 Feb 1835	
Posey	IN	25,222	410	11 Nov 1814	
Pulaski	IN	12,514	434	7 Feb 1835	
Putnam	IN	36,726	481	21 Dec 1821	
Randolph	IN	24,502	452	10 Jan 1818	
Ripley	IN	28,995	446	27 Dec 1816	
Rush	IN	16,752	408	31 Dec 1821	
St. Joseph	IN	272,912	458	29 Jan 1830	
Scott	IN	24,384	190	12 Jan 1820	
Shelby	IN	45,055	411	31 Dec 1821	
Spencer	IN	19,810	397	10 Jan 1818	
Starke	IN	23,371	309	7 Feb 1835	
Steuben	IN	34,435	309	7 Feb 1835	
Sullivan	IN	20,817	447	30 Dec 1816	
Switzerland	IN	9,737	221	1 Oct 1814	
Tippecanoe	IN	186,251	500	1 Mar 1826	
Tipton	IN	15,359	261	15 Jan 1844	
Union	IN	7,087	161	5 Jan 1821	
Vanderburgh	IN	180,136	233	7 Jan 1818	
Vermillion	IN	15,439	257	2 Jan 1824	
Vigo	IN	106,153	403	21 Jan 1818	
Wabash	IN	30,976	412	Jan 1820	
Warren	IN	8,440	365	1 Mar 1827	
Warrick	IN	63,898	385	30 Apr 1813	
Washington	IN	28,182	514	21 Dec 1813	
Wayne	IN	66,553	402	27 Nov 1811	
Wells	IN	28,180	368	2 Feb 1837	
White	IN	24,688	505	1 Feb 1834	
Whitley	IN	34,191	336	7 Feb 1835	
Adair	IA	7,496	569	15 Jan 1851	
Adams	IA	3,704	424	15 Jan 1851	
Allamakee	IA	14,061	640	20 Feb 1847	
Appanoose	IA	12,317	496	17 Feb 1843	
Audubon	IA	5,674	443	15 Jan 1851	
Benton	IA	25,575	716	21 Dec 1837	
Black Hawk	IA	131,144	567	17 Feb 1853	
Boone	IA	26,715	572	13 Jan 1846	
Bremer	IA	24,988	428	15 Jan 1851	
Buchanan	IA	20,565	571	21 Dec 1837	
Buena Vista	IA	20,823	575	15 Jan 1851	
Butler	IA	14,334	580	15 Jan 1851	
Calhoun	IA	9,927	570	15 Jan 1851	
Carroll	IA	20,760	569		
Cass	IA	13,127	564		
Cedar	IA	18,505	580		
Cerro Gordo	IA	43,127	568		
Cherokee	IA	11,658	577		
Chickasaw	IA	12,012	505		
Clarke	IA	9,748	431		
Clay	IA	16,384	569		
Clayton	IA	17,043	779		
Clinton	IA	46,460	695		
Crawford	IA	16,525	714		
Dallas	IA	99,678	586		
Davis	IA	9,110	503		
Decatur	IA	7,645	532		
Delaware	IA	17,488	578		
Des Moines	IA	38,910	416		
Dickinson	IA	17,703	381		
Dubuque	IA	99,266	608		
Emmet	IA	9,388	396		
Fayette	IA	19,509	731		
Floyd	IA	15,627	501		
Franklin	IA	10,019	582		
Fremont	IA	6,605	511		
Greene	IA	8,771	568		
Grundy	IA	12,329	503		
Guthrie	IA	10,623	591		
Hamilton	IA	15,039	577		
Hancock	IA	10,795	571		
Hardin	IA	16,878	569		
Harrison	IA	14,582	697		
Henry	IA	20,482	434		
Howard	IA	9,469	473		
Humboldt	IA	9,597	434		
Ida	IA	7,005	432		
Iowa	IA	16,662	586		
Jackson	IA	19,485	636		
Jasper	IA	37,813	730		
Jefferson	IA	15,663	435		
Johnson	IA	152,854	614		
Jones	IA	20,646	575		
Keokuk	IA	10,033	579		
Kossuth	IA	14,828	973		
Lee	IA	33,555	517		
Linn	IA	230,299	718		
Louisa	IA	10,837	402		
Lucas	IA	8,634	431		
Lyon	IA	11,934	588		
Madison	IA	16,548	561		
Mahaska	IA	22,190	571		
Marion	IA	33,414	554		
Marshall	IA	40,105	572		
Mills	IA	14,484	437		
Mitchell	IA	10,565	469		
Monona	IA	8,751	693		
Monroe	IA	7,577	433		
Montgomery	IA	10,330	424		
Muscatine	IA	43,235	439		
O'Brien	IA	14,182	573		
Osceola	IA	6,192	399		
Page	IA	15,211	535		
Palo Alto	IA	8,996	564		
Plymouth	IA	25,698	864		
Pocahontas	IA	7,078	578		
Polk	IA	492,401	570		
Pottawattamie	IA	93,667	954		
Poweshiek	IA	18,662	585		
Ringgold	IA	4,663	538		
Sac	IA	9,814	576		
Scott	IA	174,669	458		
Shelby	IA	11,746	591		
Sioux	IA	35,872	768		
Story	IA	98,537	573		
Tama	IA	17,135	721		
Taylor	IA	5,896	534		
Union	IA	12,138	424		
Van Buren	IA	7,203	485		
Wapello	IA	35,437	432		
Warren	IA	52,403	572		
Washington	IA	22,565	569		
Wayne	IA	6,497	526		
Webster	IA	36,999	715		
Winnebago	IA	10,679	400		
Winneshiek	IA	20,070	690		
Woodbury	IA	105,941	873		
Worth	IA	7,443	400		
Wright	IA	12,943	581		
Allen	KS	12,526	503		
Anderson	KS	7,836	583		
Atchison	KS	16,348	432		
Barber	KS	4,228	1134		
Barton	KS	25,493	894		
Bourbon	KS	14,360	637		
Brown	KS	9,508	571		
Butler	KS	67,380	1428		
Chase	KS	2,572	776		
Chautauqua	KS	3,379	642		
Cherokee	KS	19,362	587		
Cheyenne	KS	2,616	1020		
Clark	KS	1,991	975		
Clay	KS	8,117	644		
Cloud	KS	9,032	716		
Coffey	KS	8,360	630		
Comanche	KS	1,689	788		
Cowley	KS	34,549	1126		
Crawford	KS	38,972	593		
Decatur	KS	2,764	894		
Dickinson	KS	18,402	848		
Doniphan	KS	7,510	392		
Douglas	KS	118,785	457		
Edwards	KS	2,907	622		
Elk	KS	2,483	648		
Ellis	KS	28,934	900		
Ellsworth	KS	6,376	716		
Finney	KS	38,470	1300		
Ford	KS	34,287	1099		
Franklin	KS	25,996	574		
Geary	KS	36,739	384		
Gove	KS	2,718	1072		
Graham	KS	2,415	898		
Grant	KS	7,352	575		
Gray	KS	5,653	869		
Greeley	KS	1,284	778		
Greenwood	KS	6,016	1140		
Hamilton	KS	2,518	996		
Harper	KS	5,485	802		
Harvey	KS	34,024	539		
Haskell	KS	3,780	577		
Hodgeman	KS	1,723	860		
Jackson	KS	13,232	657		
Jefferson	KS	18,368	536		
Jewell	KS	2,932	909		
Johnson	KS	609,863	477		
Kearny	KS	3,983	870		
Kingman	KS	7,470	864		
Kiowa	KS	2,460	722		
Labette	KS	20,184	649		
Lane	KS	1,574	717		
Leavenworth	KS	81,881	463		
Lincoln	KS	2,939	719		
Linn	KS	9,591	599		
Logan	KS	2,762	1073		
Lyon	KS	32,179	851		
Marion	KS	11,823	903		
Marshall	KS	10,038	900		
McPherson	KS	30,223	943		
Meade	KS	4,055	978		
Miami	KS	34,191	577		
Mitchell	KS	5,796	700		
Montgomery	KS	31,486	645		
Morris	KS	5,386	697		
Morton	KS	2,701	730		
Nemaha	KS	10,273	719		
Neosho	KS	15,904	572		
Ness	KS	2,687	1075		
Norton	KS	5,459	878		
Osage	KS	15,766	704		
Osborne	KS	3,500	893		
Ottawa	KS	5,735	721		
Pawnee	KS	6,253	754		
Phillips	KS	4,981	886		
Pottawatomie	KS	25,348	844		
Pratt	KS	9,157	735		
Rawlins	KS	2,561	1070		
Reno	KS	61,898	1254		
Republic	KS	4,674	716		
Rice	KS	9,427	727		
Riley	KS	71,959	610		
Rooks	KS	4,919	888		
Rush	KS	2,956	718		
Russell	KS	6,691	885		
Saline	KS	54,303	720		
Scott	KS	5,151	718		
Sedgwick	KS	523,824	1000		
Seward	KS	21,964	640		
Shawnee	KS	178,909	550		
Sheridan	KS	2,447	896		
Sherman	KS	5,927	1056		
Smith	KS	3,570	896		
Stafford	KS	4,072	792		
Stanton	KS	2,084	680		
Stevens	KS	5,250	728		
Sumner	KS	22,382	1182		
Thomas	KS	7,930	1075		
Trego	KS	2,808	888		
Wabaunsee	KS	6,877	798		
Wallace	KS	1,512	914		
Washington	KS	5,530	898		
Wichita	KS	2,152	719		
Wilson	KS	8,624	574		
Woodson	KS	3,115	501		
Wyandotte	KS	169,245	151		
Adair	KY	18,903	407		
Allen	KY	20,588	344		
Anderson	KY	23,852	203		
Ballard	KY	7,728	251		
Barren	KY	44,485	491		
Bath	KY	12,750	279		
Bell	KY	24,097	361		
Boone	KY	135,968	246		
Bourbon	KY	20,252	291		
Boyd	KY	48,261	160		
Boyle	KY	30,614	182		
Bracken	KY	8,400	203		
Breathitt	KY	13,718	495		
Breckinridge	KY	20,432	572		
Bullitt	KY	82,217	299		
Butler	KY	12,371	428		
Caldwell	KY	12,649	347		
Calloway	KY	37,103	386		
Campbell	KY	93,076	152		
Carlisle	KY	4,826	192		
Carroll	KY	10,810	130		
Carter	KY	26,627	411		
Casey	KY	15,941	446		
Christian	KY	72,748	721		
Clark	KY	36,972	254		
Clay	KY	20,345	471		
Clinton	KY	9,253	198		
Crittenden	KY	8,990	362		
Cumberland	KY	5,888	306		
Daviess	KY	103,312	462		
Edmonson	KY	12,126	303		
Elliott	KY	7,354	234		
Estill	KY	14,163	254		
Fayette	KY	322,570	284		
Fleming	KY	15,082	351		
Floyd	KY	35,942	394		
Franklin	KY	51,541	210		
Fulton	KY	6,515	209		
Gallatin	KY	8,690	105		
Garrard	KY	16,953	231		
Grant	KY	24,941	260		
Graves	KY	36,649	556		
Grayson	KY	26,420	504		
Green	KY	11,107	289		
Greenup	KY	35,962	346		
Hancock	KY	9,095	189		
Hardin	KY	110,702	628		
Harlan	KY	26,831	467		
Harrison	KY	18,692	310		
Hart	KY	19,288	416		
Henderson	KY	44,793	440		
Henry	KY	15,678	289		
Hickman	KY	4,521	244		
Hopkins	KY	45,423	551		
Jackson	KY	12,955	346		
Jefferson	KY	782,969	385		
Jessamine	KY	52,991	173		
Johnson	KY	22,680	262		
Kenton	KY	169,064	163		
Knott	KY	14,251	352		
Knox	KY	30,193	388		
LaRue	KY	14,867	263		
Laurel	KY	62,613	436		
Lawrence	KY	16,293	419		
Lee	KY	7,395	210		
Leslie	KY	10,513	404		
Letcher	KY	21,548	339		
Lewis	KY	13,080	484		
Lincoln	KY	24,275	337		
Livingston	KY	8,888	316		
Logan	KY	27,432	556		
Lyon	KY	8,680	216		
Madison	KY	92,701	441		
Magoffin	KY	11,637	310		
Marion	KY	19,581	347		
Marshall	KY	31,659	305		
Martin	KY	11,287	231		
Mason	KY	17,120	241		
McCracken	KY	67,875	251		
McCreary	KY	16,888	428		
McLean	KY	9,152	254		
Meade	KY	30,003	308		
Menifee	KY	6,113	204		
Mercer	KY	22,641	251		
Metcalfe	KY	10,286	291		
Monroe	KY	11,338	331		
Montgomery	KY	28,114	199		
Morgan	KY	13,726	381		
Muhlenberg	KY	30,928	475		
Nelson	KY	46,738	423		
Nicholas	KY	7,537	197		
Ohio	KY	23,772	594		
Oldham	KY	67,607	189		
Owen	KY	11,278	352		
Owsley	KY	4,051	198		
Pendleton	KY	14,644	280		
Perry	KY	28,473	342		
Pike	KY	58,669	788		
Powell	KY	13,129	180		
Pulaski	KY	65,034	662		
Robertson	KY	2,193	100		
Rockcastle	KY	16,037	318		
Rowan	KY	24,662	281		
Russell	KY	17,991	254		
Scott	KY	57,155	285		
Shelby	KY	48,065	384		
Simpson	KY	19,594	236		
Spencer	KY	19,490	186		
Taylor	KY	26,023	270		
Todd	KY	12,243	376		
Trigg	KY	14,061	443		
Trimble	KY	8,474	149		
Union	KY	13,668	345		
Warren	KY	134,554	545		
Washington	KY	12,027	301		
Wayne	KY	19,555	459		
Webster	KY	13,017	335		
Whitley	KY	36,712	440		
Wolfe	KY	6,562	223		
Woodford	KY	26,871	191		
Acadia	LA	57,576	658		
Allen	LA	22,750	766		
Ascension	LA	126,500	303		
Assumption	LA	21,039	364		
Avoyelles	LA	39,693	866		
Beauregard	LA	36,549	1166		
Bienville	LA	12,981	822		
Bossier	LA	128,746	867		
Caddo	LA	237,848	937		
Calcasieu	LA	216,785	1094		
Caldwell	LA	9,645	541		
Cameron	LA	5,617	1932		
Catahoula	LA	8,906	739		
Claiborne	LA	14,170	768		
Concordia	LA	18,687	749		
De Soto	LA	26,812	895		
East Baton Rouge	LA	456,781	471		
East Carroll	LA	7,459	442		
East Feliciana	LA	19,539	456		
Evangeline	LA	32,350	680		
Franklin	LA	19,774	636		
Grant	LA	22,169	664		
Iberia	LA	69,929	1031		
Iberville	LA	30,241	653		
Jackson	LA	15,031	580		
Jefferson	LA	440,781	642		
Jefferson Davis	LA	32,250	659		
Lafayette	LA	241,753	270		
Lafourche	LA	97,557	1472		
LaSalle	LA	14,791	663		
Lincoln	LA	48,396	472		
Livingston	LA	142,282	703		
Madison	LA	10,017	651		
Morehouse	LA	25,629	805		
Natchitoches	LA	37,515	1299		
Orleans	LA	383,997	350		(Note: The City of New Orleans and Orleans Parish, Louisiana have a fully consolidated city and parish government.)
Ouachita	LA	160,368	633		
Plaquemines	LA	23,515	2429		
Pointe Coupee	LA	20,758	591		
Rapides	LA	130,023	1362		
Red River	LA	7,620	402		
Richland	LA	20,043	564		
Sabine	LA	22,155	1012		
St. Bernard	LA	43,764	1794		
St. Charles	LA	52,549	410		
St. Helena	LA	10,920	409		
St. James	LA	20,192	258		
St. John the Baptist	LA	42,477	348		
St. Landry	LA	82,540	939		
St. Martin	LA	51,767	817		
St. Mary	LA	49,406	612		
St. Tammany	LA	264,570	1124		
Tangipahoa	LA	133,157	823		
Tensas	LA	4,147	641		
Terrebonne	LA	109,580	2080		
Union	LA	21,107	905		
Vermilion	LA	57,359	1538		
Vernon	LA	48,750	1341		
Washington	LA	45,463	676		
Webster	LA	36,967	615		
West Baton Rouge	LA	27,199	203		
West Carroll	LA	9,751	360		
West Feliciana	LA	15,310	426		
Winn	LA	13,755	957		
Androscoggin	ME	111,139	497	18 Mar 1854	
Aroostook	ME	67,105	6829	1 May 1839	
Cumberland	ME	303,069	1217	1 Nov 1760	
Franklin	ME	29,456	1744	9 May 1838	
Hancock	ME	55,478	2351	25 Jun 1789	
Kennebec	ME	123,642	951	20 Feb 1799	
Knox	ME	40,607	1142	1 Apr 1860	
Lincoln	ME	35,237	700	1 Nov 1760	
Oxford	ME	57,777	2175	4 Mar 1805	
Penobscot	ME	152,199	3556	15 Feb 1816	
Piscataquis	ME	16,800	4377	23 Mar 1838	
Sagadahoc	ME	36,699	370	14 Feb 1854	
Somerset	ME	50,477	4095	1 Mar 1809	
Waldo	ME	39,607	853	7 Feb 1827	
Washington	ME	31,095	3255	25 Jun 1789	
York	ME	211,972	1271	1636	
Allegany	MD	68,106	424	25 Dec 1789	
Anne Arundel	MD	588,261	415	9 Apr 1650	
Baltimore	MD	854,535	598	30 Jun 1659	
Calvert	MD	92,783	213	3 Jul 1654	
Caroline	MD	33,293	319	1773	
Carroll	MD	172,891	448	19 Jan 1837	
Cecil	MD	103,725	418	6 Jun 1674	
Charles	MD	166,617	458	13 Apr 1658	
Dorchester	MD	32,531	541	1669	
Frederick	MD	271,717	660	10 Jun 1748	
Garrett	MD	28,806	667	4 Nov 1872	
Harford	MD	260,924	437	17 Dec 1773	
Howard	MD	332,317	251	13 May 1838	
Kent	MD	19,198	277	30 Dec 1642	
Montgomery	MD	1,062,061	493	6 Sep 1776	
Prince George's	MD	967,201	483	23 Apr 1696	
Queen Anne's	MD	49,874	372	1706	
St. Mary's	MD	113,777	357	24 Jan 1637	
Somerset	MD	24,620	611	22 Aug 1666	
Talbot	MD	37,526	267	12 Feb 1661	
Washington	MD	154,705	458	6 Sep 1776	
Wicomico	MD	103,588	374	1867	
Worcester	MD	52,460	468	1742	
Baltimore City	MD	585,708	80	18 Sep 1867	(Note: The City of Baltimore, Maryland is an independent city exclusive of any county.)
Barnstable	MA	228,996	396	2 Jun 1685	
Berkshire	MA	129,026	931	24 Apr 1761	(Note: Has no functional county government.)
Bristol	MA	579,200	556	2 Jun 1685	
Dukes	MA	20,600	104	22 Jun 1695	
Essex	MA	809,829	498	10 May 1643	
Franklin	MA	71,029	702	24 Jun 1811	
Hampden	MA	465,825	618	1 Aug 1812	
Hampshire	MA	162,308	529	1662	
Middlesex	MA	1,632,002	824	10 May 1643	
Nantucket	MA	14,255	48	22 Jun 1695	(Note: The Town and County of Nantucket, Massachusetts has a fully consolidated town and county government. The town was founded in 1671 while its incorporation as a county was on June 22, 1695.)
Norfolk	MA	725,981	400	20 Jun 1793	
Plymouth	MA	530,819	661	2 Jun 1685	
Suffolk	MA	797,936	58	10 May 1643	
Worcester	MA	862,111	1513	2 Apr 1731	
Alcona	MI	10,167	1791		
Alger	MI	8,842	5049		
Allegan	MI	120,502	1833		
Alpena	MI	28,907	1695		
Antrim	MI	23,431	602		
Arenac	MI	15,002	681		
Baraga	MI	8,158	1069		
Barry	MI	62,423	577		
Bay	MI	103,856	631		
Benzie	MI	17,970	860		
Berrien	MI	154,316	1581		
Branch	MI	44,862	519		
Calhoun	MI	134,310	718		
Cass	MI	51,589	508		
Charlevoix	MI	26,054	1391		
Cheboygan	MI	25,579	885		
Chippewa	MI	36,785	2698		
Clare	MI	30,856	885		
Clinton	MI	79,128	575		
Crawford	MI	12,988	563		
Delta	MI	36,903	1992		
Dickinson	MI	25,947	777		
Eaton	MI	109,175	579		
Emmet	MI	34,112	882		
Genesee	MI	406,211	649		
Gladwin	MI	25,386	516		
Gogebic	MI	14,380	1476		
Grand Traverse	MI	95,238	601		
Gratiot	MI	41,761	572		
Hillsdale	MI	45,746	607		
Houghton	MI	37,361	1502		
Huron	MI	31,407	2136		
Ingham	MI	284,900	561		
Ionia	MI	66,804	580		
Iosco	MI	25,237	1891		
Iron	MI	11,631	1211		
Isabella	MI	64,394	578		
Jackson	MI	160,366	724		
Kalamazoo	MI	261,670	580		
Kalkaska	MI	17,939	571		
Kent	MI	657,974	872		
Keweenaw	MI	2,046	5966		
Lake	MI	12,096	575		
Lapeer	MI	88,619	663		
Leelanau	MI	22,301	2532		
Lenawee	MI	99,423	761		
Livingston	MI	193,866	585		
Luce	MI	5,339	1912		
Mackinac	MI	10,834	2101		
Macomb	MI	881,217	570		
Manistee	MI	25,032	1281		
Marquette	MI	66,017	3425		
Mason	MI	29,052	1242		
Mecosta	MI	39,714	571		
Menominee	MI	23,502	1338		
Midland	MI	83,494	528		
Missaukee	MI	15,052	574		
Monroe	MI	154,809	680		
Montcalm	MI	66,614	721		
Montmorency	MI	9,153	562		
Muskegon	MI	175,824	1459		
Newaygo	MI	49,978	861		
Oakland	MI	1,274,395	908		
Oceana	MI	26,659	1307		
Ogemaw	MI	20,770	575		
Ontonagon	MI	5,816	3741		
Osceola	MI	22,891	573		
Oscoda	MI	8,219	572		
Otsego	MI	25,091	526		
Ottawa	MI	296,200	1632		
Presque Isle	MI	12,982	2573		
Roscommon	MI	23,459	580		
Saginaw	MI	190,124	816		
St. Clair	MI	160,383	837		
St. Joseph	MI	60,939	521		
Sanilac	MI	40,611	1590		
Schoolcraft	MI	8,047	1884		
Shiawassee	MI	68,094	541		
Tuscola	MI	53,323	914		
Van Buren	MI	75,587	1090		
Washtenaw	MI	372,258	723		
Wayne	MI	1,793,561	672		
Wexford	MI	33,673	576		
Aitkin	MN	15,697	1819.3		
Anoka	MN	363,887	423.61		
Becker	MN	35,183	1310.42		
Beltrami	MN	46,228	2505.27		
Benton	MN	41,379	408.28		
Big Stone	MN	5,166	496.95		
Blue Earth	MN	69,112	752.36		
Brown	MN	25,912	610.86		
Carlton	MN	36,207	860.33		
Carver	MN	106,922	357.04		
Cass	MN	30,066	2017.6		
Chippewa	MN	12,598	582.8		
Chisago	MN	56,621	417.63		
Clay	MN	65,318	1045.24		
Clearwater	MN	8,524	994.71		
Cook	MN	5,600	1450.6		
Cottonwood	MN	11,517	639.99		
Crow Wing	MN	66,123	996.57		
Dakota	MN	439,882	569.58		
Dodge	MN	20,867	439.5		
Douglas	MN	39,006	634.32		
Faribault	MN	13,921	713.63		
Fillmore	MN	21,228	861.25		
Freeborn	MN	30,895	707.64		
Goodhue	MN	47,582	758.27		
Grant	MN	6,074	546.41		
Hennepin	MN	1,281,565	556.62		
Houston	MN	18,843	558.41		
Hubbard	MN	21,344	922.46		
Isanti	MN	41,135	439.07		
Itasca	MN	45,014	2665.06		
Jackson	MN	9,989	701.69		
Kanabec	MN	16,032	524.93		
Kandiyohi	MN	43,732	796.06		
Kittson	MN	4,207	1097.08		
Koochiching	MN	12,062	3102.36		
Lac qui Parle	MN	6,719	764.87		
Lake	MN	10,905	2099.16		
Lake of the Woods	MN	3,763	1296.7		
Le Sueur	MN	28,674	448.5		
Lincoln	MN	5,640	537.03		
Lyon	MN	25,269	714.17		
Mahnomen	MN	5,411	556.14		
Marshall	MN	9,040	1772.24		
Martin	MN	20,025	709.34		
McLeod	MN	36,771	491.91		
Meeker	MN	23,400	608.54		
Mille Lacs	MN	26,459	574.47		
Morrison	MN	34,010	1124.5		
Mower	MN	40,029	711.5		
Murray	MN	8,179	704.43		
Nicollet	MN	34,454	452.29		
Nobles	MN	22,290	715.39		
Norman	MN	6,441	876.27		
Olmsted	MN	162,847	653.01		
Otter Tail	MN	60,081	1979.71		
Pennington	MN	13,992	616.54		
Pine	MN	28,876	1411.04		
Pipestone	MN	9,424	465.89		
Polk	MN	31,192	1970.37		
Pope	MN	11,308	670.14		
Ramsey	MN	552,352	155.78		
Red Lake	MN	3,935	432.43		
Redwood	MN	15,425	879.73		
Renville	MN	14,723	982.92		
Rice	MN	67,097	497.57		
Rock	MN	9,704	482.61		
Roseau	MN	15,331	1662.51		
St. Louis	MN	200,231	6225.16		
Scott	MN	150,928	356.68		
Sherburne	MN	97,183	436.3		
Sibley	MN	14,836	588.65		
Stearns	MN	158,292	1344.52		
Steele	MN	37,406	429.55		
Stevens	MN	9,671	562.06		
Swift	MN	9,838	743.53		
Todd	MN	25,262	942.02		
Traverse	MN	3,360	574.09		
Wabasha	MN	21,387	525.01		
Wadena	MN	14,065	535.02		
Waseca	MN	18,968	432.25		
Washington	MN	267,568	391.7		
Watonwan	MN	11,253	434.51		
Wilkin	MN	6,506	751.43		
Winona	MN	49,671	626.3		
Wright	MN	141,337	660.5		
Yellow Medicine	MN	9,528	757.96		
Adams	MS	29,538	460		
Alcorn	MS	34,740	400		
Amite	MS	12,720	730		
Attala	MS	17,889	735		
Benton	MS	7,646	407		
Bolivar	MS	30,985	876		
Calhoun	MS	13,266	587		
Carroll	MS	9,998	628		
Chickasaw	MS	17,106	502		
Choctaw	MS	8,246	419		
Claiborne	MS	9,135	487		
Clarke	MS	15,615	691		
Clay	MS	18,636	409		
Coahoma	MS	21,390	554		
Copiah	MS	28,368	777		
Covington	MS	18,340	414		
DeSoto	MS	185,314	478		
Forrest	MS	78,158	467		
Franklin	MS	7,675	565		
George	MS	24,350	478		
Greene	MS	13,530	713		
Grenada	MS	21,629	422		
Hancock	MS	46,053	477		
Harrison	MS	208,621	581		
Hinds	MS	227,742	869		
Holmes	MS	17,000	756		
Humphreys	MS	7,785	418		
Issaquena	MS	1,338	413		
Itawamba	MS	23,863	532		
Jackson	MS	143,252	727		
Jasper	MS	16,367	676		
Jefferson	MS	7,260	519		
Jefferson Davis	MS	11,321	408		
Jones	MS	67,246	694		
Kemper	MS	8,988	766		
Lafayette	MS	55,813	631		
Lamar	MS	64,222	497		
Lauderdale	MS	72,984	704		
Lawrence	MS	12,016	431		
Leake	MS	21,275	583		
Lee	MS	83,343	450		
Leflore	MS	28,339	592		
Lincoln	MS	34,907	586		
Lowndes	MS	58,879	502		
Madison	MS	109,145	719		
Marion	MS	24,441	542		
Marshall	MS	33,752	706		
Monroe	MS	34,180	764		
Montgomery	MS	9,822	407		
Neshoba	MS	29,087	570		
Newton	MS	21,291	578		
Noxubee	MS	10,285	695		
Oktibbeha	MS	51,788	458		
Panola	MS	33,208	684		
Pearl River	MS	56,145	812		
Perry	MS	11,511	647		
Pike	MS	40,324	409		
Pontotoc	MS	31,184	497		
Prentiss	MS	25,008	415		
Quitman	MS	6,176	405		
Rankin	MS	157,031	775		
Scott	MS	27,990	609		
Sharkey	MS	3,800	428		
Simpson	MS	25,949	589		
Smith	MS	14,209	636		
Stone	MS	18,333	445		
Sunflower	MS	25,971	694		
Tallahatchie	MS	12,715	644		
Tate	MS	28,064	404		
Tippah	MS	21,815	458		
Tishomingo	MS	18,850	424		
Tunica	MS	9,782	455		
Union	MS	27,777	416		
Walthall	MS	13,884	404		
Warren	MS	44,722	587		
Washington	MS	44,922	724		
Wayne	MS	19,779	810		
Webster	MS	9,926	423		
Wilkinson	MS	8,587	677		
Winston	MS	17,714	607		
Yalobusha	MS	12,481	467		
Yazoo	MS	26,743	920		
Adair	MO	25,314	568		
Andrew	MO	18,135	435		
Atchison	MO	5,305	545		
Audrain	MO	24,962	693		
Barry	MO	34,534	779		
Barton	MO	11,637	594		
Bates	MO	16,042	848		
Benton	MO	19,394	706		
Bollinger	MO	10,567	621		
Boone	MO	183,610	685		
Buchanan	MO	84,793	410		
Butler	MO	42,130	698		
Caldwell	MO	8,815	429		
Callaway	MO	44,283	839		
Camden	MO	42,745	655		
Cape Girardeau	MO	81,710	579		
Carroll	MO	8,495	695		
Carter	MO	5,202	508		
Cass	MO	107,824	699		
Cedar	MO	14,188	476		
Chariton	MO	7,408	756		
Christian	MO	88,842	563		
Clark	MO	6,634	507		
Clay	MO	253,335	396		
Clinton	MO	21,184	419		
Cole	MO	77,279	392		
Cooper	MO	17,103	565		
Crawford	MO	23,056	743		
Dade	MO	7,569	490		
Dallas	MO	17,071	542		
Daviess	MO	8,430	567		
DeKalb	MO	11,029	424		
Dent	MO	14,421	754		
Douglas	MO	11,578	815		
Dunklin	MO	28,283	546		
Franklin	MO	104,682	922		
Gasconade	MO	14,794	520		
Gentry	MO	6,162	492		
Greene	MO	298,915	675		
Grundy	MO	9,808	436		
Harrison	MO	8,157	725		
Henry	MO	21,946	702		
Hickory	MO	8,279	399		
Holt	MO	4,223	462		
Howard	MO	10,151	466		
Howell	MO	39,750	928		
Iron	MO	9,537	551		
Jackson	MO	717,204	605		
Jasper	MO	122,761	640		
Jefferson	MO	226,739	657		
Johnson	MO	54,013	831		
Knox	MO	3,744	506		
Laclede	MO	36,039	766		
Lafayette	MO	32,984	629		
Lawrence	MO	38,001	613		
Lewis	MO	10,032	505		
Lincoln	MO	59,574	630		
Linn	MO	11,874	620		
Livingston	MO	14,557	535		
Macon	MO	15,209	497		
Madison	MO	12,626	528		
Maries	MO	8,432	438		
Marion	MO	28,525	540		
McDonald	MO	23,303	804		
Mercer	MO	3,538	454		
Miller	MO	24,722	592		
Mississippi	MO	12,577	413		
Moniteau	MO	15,473	417		
Monroe	MO	8,666	646		
Montgomery	MO	11,322	539		
Morgan	MO	21,006	598		
New Madrid	MO	16,434	678		
Newton	MO	58,648	626		
Nodaway	MO	21,241	877		
Oregon	MO	8,635	792		
Osage	MO	13,274	606		
Ozark	MO	8,553	747		
Pemiscot	MO	15,661	493		
Perry	MO	18,956	475		
Pettis	MO	42,980	685		
Phelps	MO	44,638	673		
Pike	MO	17,587	673		
Platte	MO	106,718	420		
Polk	MO	31,519	637		
Pulaski	MO	53,955	547		
Putnam	MO	4,681	518		
Ralls	MO	10,355	471		
Randolph	MO	24,716	482		
Ray	MO	23,158	570		
Reynolds	MO	6,096	811		
Ripley	MO	10,679	630		
St. Charles	MO	405,262	593		
St. Clair	MO	9,284	677		
St. Francois	MO	66,922	508		
St. Louis	MO	1,004,125	508		
Ste. Genevieve	MO	18,479	502		
Saline	MO	23,333	756		
Schuyler	MO	4,032	308		
Scotland	MO	4,716	438		
Scott	MO	38,059	421		
Shannon	MO	7,031	1,004		
Shelby	MO	6,103	501		
Stoddard	MO	28,672	827		
Stone	MO	31,076	463		
Sullivan	MO	5,999	651		
Taney	MO	56,066	632		
Texas	MO	24,487	1,179		
Vernon	MO	19,707	834		
Warren	MO	35,532	432		
Washington	MO	23,514	760		
Wayne	MO	10,974	761		
Webster	MO	39,085	593		
Worth	MO	1,973	266		
Wright	MO	18,188	682		
St. Louis, City of	MO	301,578	61.9		(Note: The City of St. Louis, Missouri is an independent city exclusive of any county.)
Beaverhead	MT	9,371	5543		
Big Horn	MT	13,124	4995		
Blaine	MT	7,044	4226		
Broadwater	MT	6,774	1192		
Carbon	MT	10,473	2048		
Carter	MT	1,415	3340		
Cascade	MT	84,414	2698		
Chouteau	MT	5,895	3973		
Custer	MT	11,867	3783		
Daniels	MT	1,661	1426		
Dawson	MT	8,940	2373		
Deer Lodge	MT	9,421	737		
Fallon	MT	3,049	1620		
Fergus	MT	11,446	4339		
Flathead	MT	104,357	5099		
Gallatin	MT	118,960	2507		
Garfield	MT	1,173	4668		
Glacier	MT	13,778	2995		
Golden Valley	MT	823	1175		
Granite	MT	3,309	1728		
Hill	MT	16,309	2896		
Jefferson	MT	12,085	1657		
Judith Basin	MT	2,023	1870		
Lake	MT	31,134	1490		
Lewis and Clark	MT	70,973	3461		
Liberty	MT	1,959	1430		
Lincoln	MT	19,677	3613		
Madison	MT	8,623	2643		
McCone	MT	1,729	3587		
Meagher	MT	1,927	2392		
Mineral	MT	4,535	1220		
Missoula	MT	117,922	2598		
Musselshell	MT	4,730	1867		
Park	MT	17,191	2656		
Petroleum	MT	496	1654		
Phillips	MT	4,217	5140		
Pondera	MT	5,898	1625		
Powder River	MT	1,694	3297		
Powell	MT	6,946	2326		
Prairie	MT	1,088	1737		
Ravalli	MT	44,174	2394		
Richland	MT	11,491	2084		
Roosevelt	MT	10,794	2356		
Rosebud	MT	8,329	5012		
Sanders	MT	12,400	2762		
Sheridan	MT	3,539	1677		
Silver Bow	MT	35,133	718		
Stillwater	MT	8,963	1795		
Sweet Grass	MT	3,678	1855		
Teton	MT	6,226	2273		
Toole	MT	4,971	1911		
Treasure	MT	762	979		
Valley	MT	7,578	4921		
Wheatland	MT	2,069	1423		
Wibaux	MT	937	889		
Yellowstone	MT	164,731	2635		
Adams	NE	31,205	563		
Antelope	NE	6,295	857		
Arthur	NE	434	715		
Banner	NE	674	746		
Blaine	NE	431	711		
Boone	NE	5,379	687		
Box Butte	NE	10,842	1075		
Boyd	NE	1,810	540		
Brown	NE	2,903	1221		
Buffalo	NE	50,084	968		
Burt	NE	6,722	493		
Butler	NE	8,369	584		
Cass	NE	26,598	559		
Cedar	NE	8,380	740		
Chase	NE	3,893	894		
Cherry	NE	5,455	5961		
Cheyenne	NE	9,468	1196		
Clay	NE	6,104	573		
Colfax	NE	10,582	413		
Cuming	NE	9,013	572		
Custer	NE	10,545	2579		
Dakota	NE	21,582	264		
Dawes	NE	8,199	1396		
Dawson	NE	24,111	1013		
Deuel	NE	1,838	440		
Dixon	NE	5,606	476		
Dodge	NE	37,167	534		
Douglas	NE	584,526	331		
Dundy	NE	1,654	920		
Fillmore	NE	5,551	576		
Franklin	NE	2,889	576		
Frontier	NE	2,519	975		
Furnas	NE	4,636	718		
Gage	NE	21,704	855		
Garden	NE	1,874	1705		
Garfield	NE	1,813	570		
Gosper	NE	1,893	458		
Grant	NE	611	776		
Greeley	NE	2,188	570		
Hall	NE	62,895	546		
Hamilton	NE	9,429	544		
Harlan	NE	3,073	553		
Hayes	NE	856	713		
Hitchcock	NE	2,616	710		
Holt	NE	10,127	2413		
Hooker	NE	711	721		
Howard	NE	6,475	570		
Jefferson	NE	7,240	573		
Johnson	NE	5,290	376		
Kearney	NE	6,688	516		
Keith	NE	8,335	1061		
Keya Paha	NE	769	773		
Kimball	NE	3,434	952		
Knox	NE	8,391	1108		
Lancaster	NE	322,608	839		
Lincoln	NE	34,676	2564		
Logan	NE	716	571		
Loup	NE	607	570		
Madison	NE	35,585	859		
McPherson	NE	399	573		
Merrick	NE	7,668	485		
Morrill	NE	4,555	1424		
Nance	NE	3,380	441		
Nemaha	NE	7,074	409		
Nuckolls	NE	4,095	575		
Otoe	NE	15,912	616		
Pawnee	NE	2,544	432		
Perkins	NE	2,858	883		
Phelps	NE	8,968	540		
Pierce	NE	7,317	574		
Platte	NE	34,296	678		
Polk	NE	5,214	439		
Red Willow	NE	10,702	717		
Richardson	NE	7,871	554		
Rock	NE	1,262	1008		
Saline	NE	14,292	575		
Sarpy	NE	190,604	241		
Saunders	NE	22,278	754		
Scotts Bluff	NE	36,084	739		
Seward	NE	17,609	575		
Sheridan	NE	5,127	2441		
Sherman	NE	2,959	566		
Sioux	NE	1,135	1313		
Stanton	NE	5,842	430		
Thayer	NE	5,034	575		
Thomas	NE	669	713		
Thurston	NE	6,773	394		
Valley	NE	4,059	568		
Washington	NE	20,865	390		
Wayne	NE	9,697	444		
Webster	NE	3,395	575		
Wheeler	NE	774	575		
York	NE	14,125	576		
Churchill	NV	25,516	4929	25 Nov 1861	
Clark	NV	2,265,461	7911	5 Feb 1909	
Douglas	NV	49,488	710	25 Nov 1861	
Elko	NV	53,702	17182	1869	
Esmeralda	NV	729	3589	25 Nov 1861	
Eureka	NV	1,855	4176	1873	
Humboldt	NV	17,285	9658	25 Nov 1861	
Lander	NV	5,734	5798	1862	
Lincoln	NV	4,499	10635	1866	
Lyon	NV	59,235	1994	25 Nov 1861	
Mineral	NV	4,554	3757	1911	
Nye	NV	51,591	18147	1864	
Pershing	NV	6,650	6009	18 Mar 1919	
Storey	NV	4,104	264	25 Nov 1861	
Washoe	NV	486,492	6342	25 Nov 1861	
White Pine	NV	9,080	8877	1869	
Carson City	NV	58,639	144	1 Apr 1969	(Note: The Consolidated Municipality of Carson City, Nevada is an independent city exclusive of any county. The city was founded in 1858 while Carson City became an independent city on April 1, 1969 when it consolidated with Ormsby County.)
Belknap	NH	63,705	401	1840	
Carroll	NH	50,107	934	1840	
Cheshire	NH	76,458	708	1769	
Coos	NH	31,268	1801	24 Dec 1803	
Grafton	NH	91,118	1714	1769	
Hillsborough	NH	422,937	876	1769	
Merrimack	NH	153,808	934	1823	
Rockingham	NH	314,176	695	1769	
Strafford	NH	130,889	369	1769	
Sullivan	NH	43,063	537	1827	
Atlantic	NJ	274,534	561		
Bergen	NJ	955,732	234	1683	
Burlington	NJ	461,860	805		
Camden	NJ	523,485	222		
Cape May	NJ	95,263	255		
Cumberland	NJ	154,152	489		
Essex	NJ	863,728	126		
Gloucester	NJ	302,294	325		
Hudson	NJ	724,854	47		
Hunterdon	NJ	128,947	430		
Mercer	NJ	387,340	226		
Middlesex	NJ	863,162	311		
Monmouth	NJ	643,615	472		
Morris	NJ	509,285	469		
Ocean	NJ	637,229	636		
Passaic	NJ	524,118	185		
Salem	NJ	64,837	338		
Somerset	NJ	345,361	305		
Sussex	NJ	144,221	521		
Union	NJ	575,345	103		
Warren	NJ	109,632	358		
Bernalillo	NM	676,444	1166		
Catron	NM	3,579	6928		
Chaves	NM	65,157	6071		
Cibola	NM	27,172	4540		
Colfax	NM	12,387	3757		
Curry	NM	48,430	1406		
De Baca	NM	1,698	2325		
Doña Ana	NM	219,561	3807		
Eddy	NM	62,314	4182		
Grant	NM	28,185	3966		
Guadalupe	NM	4,452	3031		
Harding	NM	657	2126		
Hidalgo	NM	4,178	3446		
Lea	NM	74,455	4393		
Lincoln	NM	20,269	4831		
Los Alamos	NM	19,419	109		(Note: Los Alamos County, New Mexico has a county government with municipal functions.)
Luna	NM	25,427	2965		
McKinley	NM	72,902	5449		
Mora	NM	4,189	1931		
Otero	NM	67,839	6627		
Quay	NM	8,746	2855		
Rio Arriba	NM	40,363	5858		
Roosevelt	NM	19,191	2449		
San Juan	NM	121,661	5514		
San Miguel	NM	27,201	4717		
Sandoval	NM	148,834	3710		
Santa Fe	NM	154,823	1909		
Sierra	NM	11,576	4180		
Socorro	NM	16,595	6647		
Taos	NM	34,489	2203		
Torrance	NM	15,045	3345		
Union	NM	4,079	3830		
Valencia	NM	76,205	1068		
Albany	NY	314,848	533		
Allegany	NY	46,456	1034		
Bronx	NY	1,472,654	57.43		
Broome	NY	198,683	715		
Cattaraugus	NY	77,042	1310		
Cayuga	NY	76,248	864		
Chautauqua	NY	127,657	1500		
Chemung	NY	84,148	410.81		
Chenango	NY	47,220	898.95		
Clinton	NY	79,843	1118		
Columbia	NY	61,570	648		
Cortland	NY	46,809	502		
Delaware	NY	44,308	1468		
Dutchess	NY	295,911	825		
Erie	NY	954,236	1227		
Essex	NY	37,381	1916		
Franklin	NY	47,555	1697		
Fulton	NY	53,324	533		
Genesee	NY	58,388	495		
Greene	NY	47,931	658		
Hamilton	NY	5,107	1808		
Herkimer	NY	60,139	1458		
Jefferson	NY	116,721	1857		
Kings	NY	2,736,074	96.9		
Lewis	NY	26,582	1290		
Livingston	NY	61,834	640		
Madison	NY	68,016	662		
Monroe	NY	759,443	1366		
Montgomery	NY	49,532	410		
Nassau	NY	1,395,774	453		
New York	NY	1,694,251	33.77		
Niagara	NY	212,666	1140		
Oneida	NY	232,125	1213		
Onondaga	NY	476,516	806		
Ontario	NY	112,458	662		
Orange	NY	401,310	839		
Orleans	NY	40,343	817		
Oswego	NY	117,525	1312		
Otsego	NY	58,524	1003		
Putnam	NY	97,668	246		
Queens	NY	2,405,464	178.28		
Rensselaer	NY	161,130	665		
Richmond	NY	495,747	102.5		
Rockland	NY	338,329	199		
St. Lawrence	NY	108,505	2821		
Saratoga	NY	235,509	844		
Schenectady	NY	158,061	210		
Schoharie	NY	29,714	626		
Schuyler	NY	17,898	342		
Seneca	NY	33,814	325		
Steuben	NY	93,584	1404		
Suffolk	NY	1,525,920	2373		
Sullivan	NY	78,624	997		
Tioga	NY	48,455	523		
Tompkins	NY	105,740	476		
Ulster	NY	181,851	1161		
Warren	NY	65,737	870		
Washington	NY	61,302	846		
Wayne	NY	91,283	1384		
Westchester	NY	1,004,457	500		
Wyoming	NY	40,531	596		
Yates	NY	24,774	376		
Alamance	NC	171,415	435		
Alexander	NC	36,444	263		
Alleghany	NC	10,888	236		
Anson	NC	22,055	537		
Ashe	NC	26,577	427		
Avery	NC	17,806	247		
Beaufort	NC	44,652	959		
Bertie	NC	17,934	741		
Bladen	NC	29,606	887		
Brunswick	NC	136,693	860		
Buncombe	NC	269,452	660		
Burke	NC	87,570	515		
Cabarrus	NC	225,804	365		
Caldwell	NC	80,652	474		
Camden	NC	10,355	306		
Carteret	NC	67,686	1341		
Caswell	NC	22,736	428		
Catawba	NC	160,610	414		
Chatham	NC	76,285	709		
Cherokee	NC	28,774	497		
Chowan	NC	13,708	233		
Clay	NC	11,089	221		
Cleveland	NC	99,519	469		
Columbus	NC	50,623	954		
Craven	NC	100,720	774		
Cumberland	NC	334,728	658		
Currituck	NC	28,100	526		
Dare	NC	36,915	1562		
Davidson	NC	168,930	567		
Davie	NC	42,712	267		
Duplin	NC	48,715	819		
Durham	NC	324,833	298		
Edgecombe	NC	48,900	507		
Forsyth	NC	382,590	413		
Franklin	NC	68,573	495		
Gaston	NC	227,943	364		
Gates	NC	10,478	346		
Graham	NC	8,030	302		
Granville	NC	60,992	537		
Greene	NC	20,451	266		
Guilford	NC	541,299	658		
Halifax	NC	48,622	731		
Harnett	NC	133,568	601		
Haywood	NC	62,089	555		
Henderson	NC	116,281	375		
Hertford	NC	21,552	360		
Hoke	NC	52,082	392		
Hyde	NC	4,589	1424		
Iredell	NC	186,693	597		
Jackson	NC	43,109	494		
Johnston	NC	215,999	796		
Jones	NC	9,172	473		
Lee	NC	63,285	259		
Lenoir	NC	55,122	402		
Lincoln	NC	86,810	307		
Macon	NC	37,014	452		
Madison	NC	21,193	461		
Martin	NC	22,031	446		
McDowell	NC	44,578	519		
Mecklenburg	NC	1,115,482	546		
Mitchell	NC	14,903	222		
Montgomery	NC	25,751	502		
Moore	NC	99,727	706		
Nash	NC	94,970	543		
New Hanover	NC	225,702	328		
Northampton	NC	17,471	551		
Onslow	NC	204,576	909		
Orange	NC	148,696	401		
Pamlico	NC	12,276	566		
Pasquotank	NC	40,568	289		
Pender	NC	60,203	933		
Perquimans	NC	13,005	329		
Person	NC	39,097	404		
Pitt	NC	170,243	655		
Polk	NC	19,328	239		
Randolph	NC	144,171	790		
Richmond	NC	42,946	480		
Robeson	NC	116,530	951		
Rockingham	NC	91,096	572		
Rowan	NC	146,875	524		
Rutherford	NC	64,444	566		
Sampson	NC	59,036	947		
Scotland	NC	34,174	321		
Stanly	NC	62,504	404		
Stokes	NC	44,520	456		
Surry	NC	71,359	538		
Swain	NC	14,117	541		
Transylvania	NC	32,986	381		
Tyrrell	NC	3,245	600		
Union	NC	238,267	640		
Vance	NC	42,578	270		
Wake	NC	1,129,410	857		
Warren	NC	18,642	444		
Washington	NC	11,003	424		
Watauga	NC	54,086	313		
Wayne	NC	117,333	557		
Wilkes	NC	65,969	760		
Wilson	NC	78,784	374		
Yadkin	NC	37,214	337		
Yancey	NC	18,470	313		
Adams	ND	2,200	988		
Barnes	ND	10,853	1492		
Benson	ND	5,964	1389		
Billings	ND	945	1152		
Bottineau	ND	6,379	1669		
Bowman	ND	2,993	1162		
Burke	ND	2,201	1104		
Burleigh	ND	98,458	1633		
Cass	ND	184,525	1766		
Cavalier	ND	3,704	1489		
Dickey	ND	4,999	1131		
Divide	ND	2,195	1259		
Dunn	ND	4,095	2010		
Eddy	ND	2,347	632		
Emmons	ND	3,301	1510		
Foster	ND	3,397	635		
Golden Valley	ND	1,736	1002		
Grand Forks	ND	73,170	1438		
Grant	ND	2,301	1660		
Griggs	ND	2,306	708		
Hettinger	ND	2,489	1132		
Kidder	ND	2,394	1352		
LaMoure	ND	4,093	1147		
Logan	ND	1,876	993		
McHenry	ND	5,345	1874		
McIntosh	ND	2,530	975		
McKenzie	ND	14,704	2742		
McLean	ND	9,771	2110		
Mercer	ND	8,350	1045		
Morton	ND	33,291	1926		
Mountrail	ND	9,809	1824		
Nelson	ND	3,015	982		
Oliver	ND	1,877	724		
Pembina	ND	6,844	1119		
Pierce	ND	3,990	1018		
Ramsey	ND	11,605	1186		
Ransom	ND	5,703	863		
Renville	ND	2,282	875		
Richland	ND	16,529	1437		
Rolette	ND	12,187	902		
Sargent	ND	3,862	859		
Sheridan	ND	1,265	972		
Sioux	ND	3,898	1094		
Slope	ND	706	1218		
Stark	ND	33,646	1338		
Steele	ND	1,798	712		
Stutsman	ND	21,593	2222		
Towner	ND	2,162	1025		
Traill	ND	7,997	862		
Walsh	ND	10,563	1282		
Ward	ND	69,919	2013		
Wells	ND	3,982	1271		
Williams	ND	40,950	2071		
Northern Islands	MP	7	59.75		(Note: The Northern Marianas are divided into municipalities.)
Rota	MP	2,477	32.97		
Saipan	MP	48,220	44.55		
Tinian	MP	3,136	39.00		
Adams	OH	27,477	583.91		
Allen	OH	102,206	404.43		
Ashland	OH	52,447	424.37		
Ashtabula	OH	97,574	702.44		
Athens	OH	62,431	506.76		
Auglaize	OH	46,422	401.25		
Belmont	OH	66,497	537.35		
Brown	OH	43,676	491.76		
Butler	OH	390,357	467.27		
Carroll	OH	26,721	394.67		
Champaign	OH	38,714	428.56		
Clark	OH	136,001	399.86		
Clermont	OH	208,601	451.99		
Clinton	OH	42,018	410.88		
Columbiana	OH	101,877	532.46		
Coshocton	OH	36,612	564.07		
Crawford	OH	42,025	402.11		
Cuyahoga	OH	1,264,817	458.49		
Darke	OH	51,881	599.8		
Defiance	OH	38,286	411.16		
Delaware	OH	214,124	442.41		
Erie	OH	75,622	254.88		
Fairfield	OH	158,921	505.11		
Fayette	OH	28,951	406.58		
Franklin	OH	1,323,807	539.87		
Fulton	OH	42,713	406.78		
Gallia	OH	29,220	468.78		
Geauga	OH	95,397	403.66		
Greene	OH	167,966	414.88		
Guernsey	OH	38,438	521.9		
Hamilton	OH	830,639	407.36		
Hancock	OH	74,920	531.35		
Hardin	OH	30,696	470.29		
Harrison	OH	14,483	403.53		
Henry	OH	27,662	416.5		
Highland	OH	43,317	553.28		
Hocking	OH	28,050	422.75		
Holmes	OH	44,223	422.99		
Huron	OH	58,565	429.69		
Jackson	OH	32,653	420.28		
Jefferson	OH	65,249	409.61		
Knox	OH	62,721	527.12		
Lake	OH	232,603	228.21		
Lawrence	OH	58,240	454.96		
Licking	OH	178,519	686.5		
Logan	OH	46,150	458.44		
Lorain	OH	312,964	492.5		
Lucas	OH	431,279	340.46		
Madison	OH	43,824	465.44		
Mahoning	OH	228,614	415.25		
Marion	OH	65,359	403.84		
Medina	OH	182,470	423		
Meigs	OH	22,210	429.42		
Mercer	OH	42,528	463.27		
Miami	OH	108,774	407.04		
Monroe	OH	13,385	455.54		
Montgomery	OH	537,309	461.68		
Morgan	OH	13,802	417.66		
Morrow	OH	34,950	406.22		
Muskingum	OH	86,410	664.63		
Noble	OH	14,115	399		
Ottawa	OH	40,364	254.95		
Paulding	OH	18,806	416.26		
Perry	OH	35,408	409.78		
Pickaway	OH	58,539	501.91		
Pike	OH	27,088	441.49		
Portage	OH	161,791	492.39		
Preble	OH	40,999	424.8		
Putnam	OH	34,451	483.87		
Richland	OH	124,936	496.88		
Ross	OH	77,093	688.41		
Sandusky	OH	58,896	409.18		
Scioto	OH	74,008	612.27		
Seneca	OH	55,069	550.59		
Shelby	OH	48,230	409.27		
Stark	OH	374,853	576.14		
Summit	OH	540,428	419.38		
Trumbull	OH	201,977	616.48		
Tuscarawas	OH	93,263	567.58		
Union	OH	62,784	436.65		
Van Wert	OH	28,931	410.09		
Vinton	OH	12,800	414.08		
Warren	OH	242,337	399.63		
Washington	OH	59,771	635.15		
Wayne	OH	116,894	555.36		
Williams	OH	37,102	421.74		
Wood	OH	132,248	617.32		
Wyandot	OH	21,900	405.61		
Adair	OK	19,495	576		
Alfalfa	OK	5,699	867		
Atoka	OK	14,143	978		
Beaver	OK	5,049	1814		
Beckham	OK	22,410	902		
Blaine	OK	8,735	929		
Bryan	OK	46,067	909		
Caddo	OK	26,945	1278		
Canadian	OK	154,405	900		
Carter	OK	48,003	824		
Cherokee	OK	47,078	751		
Choctaw	OK	14,204	774		
Cimarron	OK	2,296	1835		
Cleveland	OK	295,528	536		
Coal	OK	5,266	518		
Comanche	OK	121,125	1069		
Cotton	OK	5,527	637		
Craig	OK	14,107	761		
Creek	OK	71,754	956		
Custer	OK	28,513	987		
Delaware	OK	40,397	741		
Dewey	OK	4,484	1000		
Ellis	OK	3,749	1229		
Garfield	OK	62,846	1058		
Garvin	OK	25,656	809		
Grady	OK	54,795	1101		
Grant	OK	4,169	1001		
Greer	OK	5,491	639		
Harmon	OK	2,488	538		
Harper	OK	3,272	1039		
Haskell	OK	11,561	577		
Hughes	OK	13,367	807		
Jackson	OK	24,785	803		
Jefferson	OK	5,337	759		
Johnston	OK	10,272	645		
Kay	OK	43,700	919		
Kingfisher	OK	15,184	903		
Kiowa	OK	8,509	1015		
Latimer	OK	9,444	722		
Le Flore	OK	48,129	1586		
Lincoln	OK	33,458	959		
Logan	OK	49,555	745		
Love	OK	10,146	515		
Major	OK	7,782	570		
Marshall	OK	15,312	371		
Mayes	OK	39,046	620		
McClain	OK	41,662	957		
McCurtain	OK	30,814	1850		
McIntosh	OK	18,941	656		
Murray	OK	13,904	418		
Muskogee	OK	66,339	814		
Noble	OK	10,924	732		
Nowata	OK	9,320	565		
Okfuskee	OK	11,310	625		
Oklahoma	OK	796,292	709		
Okmulgee	OK	36,706	697		
Osage	OK	45,818	2251		
Ottawa	OK	30,285	471		
Pawnee	OK	15,553	570		
Payne	OK	81,646	686		
Pittsburg	OK	43,773	1306		
Pontotoc	OK	38,065	720		
Pottawatomie	OK	72,454	788		
Pushmataha	OK	10,812	1397		
Roger Mills	OK	3,442	1142		
Rogers	OK	95,240	675		
Seminole	OK	23,556	632		
Sequoyah	OK	39,281	674		
Stephens	OK	42,848	877		
Texas	OK	21,384	2037		
Tillman	OK	6,968	872		
Tulsa	OK	669,279	570		
Wagoner	OK	80,981	563		
Washington	OK	52,455	417		
Washita	OK	10,924	1004		
Woods	OK	8,624	1287		
Woodward	OK	20,470	1242		
Baker	OR	16,668	3068		
Benton	OR	95,184	676		
Clackamas	OR	421,401	868		
Clatsop	OR	41,072	827		
Columbia	OR	52,589	657		
Coos	OR	64,929	1600		
Crook	OR	24,738	2980		
Curry	OR	23,446	1627		
Deschutes	OR	198,253	3018		
Douglas	OR	111,201	5037		
Gilliam	OR	1,995	1204		
Grant	OR	7,233	4529		
Harney	OR	7,495	10135		
Hood River	OR	23,977	522		
Jackson	OR	223,259	2785		
Jefferson	OR	24,502	1781		
Josephine	OR	88,090	1640		
Klamath	OR	69,413	5945		
Lake	OR	8,160	7940		
Lane	OR	382,971	4554		
Lincoln	OR	50,395	980		
Linn	OR	128,610	2291		
Malheur	OR	31,571	9888		
Marion	OR	345,920	1185		
Morrow	OR	12,186	2033		
Multnomah	OR	815,428	435		
Polk	OR	87,433	741		
Sherman	OR	1,870	823		
Tillamook	OR	27,390	1102		
Umatilla	OR	80,075	3215		
Union	OR	26,196	2037		
Wallowa	OR	7,391	3145		
Wasco	OR	26,670	2381		
Washington	OR	600,372	724		
Wheeler	OR	1,451	1715		
Yamhill	OR	107,722	716		
Adams	PA	103,852	522		
Allegheny	PA	1,250,578	745		
Armstrong	PA	65,558	664		
Beaver	PA	168,215	444		
Bedford	PA	47,577	1015		
Berks	PA	428,849	866		
Blair	PA	122,822	527		
Bradford	PA	59,967	1161		
Bucks	PA	646,538	622		
Butler	PA	193,763	795		
Cambria	PA	133,472	693		
Cameron	PA	4,547	399		
Carbon	PA	64,749	387		
Centre	PA	158,172	1112		
Chester	PA	534,413	760		
Clarion	PA	37,241	609		
Clearfield	PA	80,562	1154		
Clinton	PA	37,450	898		
Columbia	PA	64,727	490		
Crawford	PA	83,938	1038		
Cumberland	PA	259,469	551		
Dauphin	PA	286,401	558		
Delaware	PA	576,830	191		
Elk	PA	30,990	832		
Erie	PA	270,876	799		
Fayette	PA	128,804	798		
Forest	PA	6,973	431		
Franklin	PA	155,932	771		
Fulton	PA	14,556	438		
Greene	PA	35,954	578		
Huntingdon	PA	44,092	889		
Indiana	PA	83,246	834		
Jefferson	PA	44,492	657		
Juniata	PA	23,509	394		
Lackawanna	PA	215,896	465		
Lancaster	PA	552,984	984		
Lawrence	PA	86,070	363		
Lebanon	PA	143,257	363		
Lehigh	PA	374,557	349		
Luzerne	PA	325,594	907		
Lycoming	PA	114,188	1244		
McKean	PA	40,432	984		
Mercer	PA	110,652	683		
Mifflin	PA	46,143	415		
Monroe	PA	168,327	617		
Montgomery	PA	856,553	487		
Montour	PA	18,136	132		
Northampton	PA	312,951	377		
Northumberland	PA	91,647	477		
Perry	PA	45,842	556		
Philadelphia	PA	1,603,797	143		(Note: The City of Philadelphia and Philadelphia County, Pennsylvania have a fully consolidated city and county government.)
Pike	PA	58,535	567		
Potter	PA	16,396	1081		
Schuylkill	PA	143,049	778		
Snyder	PA	39,736	332		
Somerset	PA	74,129	1081		
Sullivan	PA	5,840	452		
Susquehanna	PA	38,434	832		
Tioga	PA	41,045	1137		
Union	PA	42,681	317		
Venango	PA	50,454	683		
Warren	PA	38,587	898		
Washington	PA	209,349	861		
Wayne	PA	51,155	751		
Westmoreland	PA	354,663	1036		
Wyoming	PA	26,069	406		
York	PA	456,438	910		
Adjuntas	PR	18,020	66.69		
Aguada	PR	38,136	30.85		
Aguadilla	PR	55,101	36.53		
Aguas Buenas	PR	24,223	30.08		
Aibonito	PR	24,637	31.31		
Añasco	PR	25,596	39.29		
Arecibo	PR	87,754	125.95		
Arroyo	PR	15,843	15.01		
Barceloneta	PR	22,657	18.69		
Barranquitas	PR	28,983	34.25		
Bayamón	PR	185,187	44.32		
Cabo Rojo	PR	47,158	70.37		
Caguas	PR	127,244	58.6		
Camuy	PR	32,827	46.35		
Canóvanas	PR	42,337	32.87		
Carolina	PR	154,815	45.32		
Cataño	PR	23,155	4.84		
Cayey	PR	41,652	51.93		
Ceiba	PR	11,307	29.04		
Ciales	PR	16,984	66.53		
Cidra	PR	39,970	36.02		
Coamo	PR	34,668	78.1		
Comerío	PR	18,883	28.4		
Corozal	PR	34,571	42.57		
Culebra	PR	1,792	11.62		
Dorado	PR	35,879	23.09		
Fajardo	PR	32,124	29.86		
Florida	PR	11,692	15.21		
Guánica	PR	13,787	37.05		
Guayama	PR	36,614	64.99		
Guayanilla	PR	17,784	42.27		
Guaynabo	PR	89,780	27.58		
Gurabo	PR	40,622	27.89		
Hatillo	PR	38,486	41.78		
Hormigueros	PR	15,654	11.34		
Humacao	PR	50,896	44.75		
Isabela	PR	42,943	55.3		
Jayuya	PR	14,779	44.53		
Juana Díaz	PR	46,538	60.28		
Juncos	PR	37,012	26.49		
Lajas	PR	23,334	59.95		
Lares	PR	28,105	61.45		
Las Marías	PR	8,874	46.36		
Las Piedras	PR	35,180	33.88		
Loíza	PR	23,693	19.37		
Luquillo	PR	17,781	25.81		
Manatí	PR	39,492	46.13		
Maricao	PR	4,755	36.62		
Maunabo	PR	10,589	21.07		
Mayagüez	PR	73,077	77.65		
Moca	PR	37,460	50.34		
Morovis	PR	28,727	38.87		
Naguabo	PR	23,386	51.66		
Naranjito	PR	29,241	27.4		
Orocovis	PR	21,434	63.62		
Patillas	PR	15,985	46.7		
Peñuelas	PR	20,399	44.62		
Ponce	PR	137,491	114.76		
Quebradillas	PR	23,638	22.68		
Rincón	PR	15,187	14.29		
Río Grande	PR	47,060	60.62		
Sabana Grande	PR	22,729	35.83		
Salinas	PR	25,789	69.37		
San Germán	PR	31,879	54.5		
San Juan	PR	342,259	47.85		
San Lorenzo	PR	37,693	53.11		
San Sebastián	PR	39,345	70.42		
Santa Isabel	PR	20,281	34.02		
Toa Alta	PR	66,852	27.02		
Toa Baja	PR	75,293	23.24		
Trujillo Alto	PR	67,740	20.76		
Utuado	PR	28,287	113.53		
Vega Alta	PR	35,395	27.73		
Vega Baja	PR	54,414	45.86		
Vieques	PR	8,249	50.77		
Villalba	PR	22,093	35.64		
Yabucoa	PR	30,426	55.21		
Yauco	PR	34,172	68.19		
Bristol	RI	50,793	24	17 Feb 1747	
Kent	RI	170,363	168	11 Jun 1750	
Newport	RI	85,643	102	22 Jun 1703	
Providence	RI	660,741	409	22 Jun 1703	
Washington	RI	129,839	329	3 Jun 1729	
Abbeville	SC	24,295	511		
Aiken	SC	168,808	1080		
Allendale	SC	8,039	413		
Anderson	SC	203,718	757		
Bamberg	SC	13,311	395		
Barnwell	SC	20,589	557		
Beaufort	SC	187,117	576		
Berkeley	SC	229,861	1228		
Calhoun	SC	14,119	392		
Charleston	SC	408,235	1358		
Cherokee	SC	56,216	397		
Chester	SC	32,294	586		
Chesterfield	SC	43,273	806		
Clarendon	SC	31,144	696		
Colleton	SC	38,604	1133		
Darlington	SC	62,905	567		
Dillon	SC	28,292	407		
Dorchester	SC	161,540	577		
Edgefield	SC	25,657	507		
Fairfield	SC	20,948	710		
Florence	SC	137,059	804		
Georgetown	SC	63,404	813.55		
Greenville	SC	525,534	795		
Greenwood	SC	69,351	463		
Hampton	SC	18,561	563		
Horry	SC	351,029	1255		
Jasper	SC	28,791	700		
Kershaw	SC	65,403	740		
Lancaster	SC	96,016	555		
Laurens	SC	67,539	724		
Lee	SC	16,531	411		
Lexington	SC	293,991	758		
Marion	SC	29,183	485		
Marlboro	SC	26,667	394		
McCormick	SC	9,526	494		
Newberry	SC	37,719	647		
Oconee	SC	78,607	674		
Orangeburg	SC	84,223	1128		
Pickens	SC	131,404	512		
Richland	SC	416,147	772		
Saluda	SC	18,862	462		
Spartanburg	SC	327,997	819		
Sumter	SC	105,556	682		
Union	SC	27,244	516		
Williamsburg	SC	31,026	937		
York	SC	282,090	696		
Aurora	SD	2,747	708		
Beadle	SD	19,149	1259		
Bennett	SD	3,381	1185		
Bon Homme	SD	7,003	563		
Brookings	SD	34,375	794		
Brown	SD	38,301	1713		
Brule	SD	5,247	819		
Buffalo	SD	1,948	471		
Butte	SD	10,243	2249		
Campbell	SD	1,377	736		
Charles Mix	SD	9,373	1098		
Clark	SD	3,837	958		
Clay	SD	14,967	412		
Codington	SD	28,325	688		
Corson	SD	3,902	2473		
Custer	SD	8,318	1558		
Davison	SD	19,956	436		
Day	SD	5,449	1029		
Deuel	SD	4,295	624		
Dewey	SD	5,239	2303		
Douglas	SD	2,835	434		
Edmunds	SD	3,986	1146		
Fall River	SD	6,973	1740		
Faulk	SD	2,125	1000		
Grant	SD	7,556	682		
Gregory	SD	3,994	1016		
Haakon	SD	1,872	1813		
Hamlin	SD	6,164	511		
Hand	SD	3,145	1437		
Hanson	SD	3,461	435		
Harding	SD	1,311	2671		
Hughes	SD	17,765	741		
Hutchinson	SD	7,427	813		
Hyde	SD	1,262	861		
Jackson	SD	2,806	1869		
Jerauld	SD	1,663	530		
Jones	SD	917	971		
Kingsbury	SD	5,187	838		
Lake	SD	11,059	563		
Lawrence	SD	25,768	800		
Lincoln	SD	65,161	578		
Lyman	SD	3,718	1640		
Marshall	SD	4,306	1137		
McCook	SD	5,682	839		
McPherson	SD	2,411	575		
Meade	SD	29,852	3471		
Mellette	SD	1,918	1307		
Miner	SD	2,298	570		
Minnehaha	SD	197,214	809		
Moody	SD	6,336	520		
Oglala Lakota	SD	13,672	2094		
Pennington	SD	109,222	2776		
Perkins	SD	2,835	2872		
Potter	SD	2,472	866		
Roberts	SD	10,280	1101		
Sanborn	SD	2,330	569		
Spink	SD	6,361	1504		
Stanley	SD	2,980	1443		
Sully	SD	1,446	1007		
Todd	SD	9,319	1388		
Tripp	SD	5,624	1614		
Turner	SD	8,673	617		
Union	SD	16,811	460		
Walworth	SD	5,315	708		
Yankton	SD	23,310	522		
Ziebach	SD	2,413	1962		
Anderson	TN	77,123	338		
Bedford	TN	50,237	474		
Benton	TN	15,864	394		
Bledsoe	TN	14,913	406		
Blount	TN	135,280	559		
Bradley	TN	108,620	329		
Campbell	TN	39,272	480		
Cannon	TN	14,506	266		
Carroll	TN	28,440	599		
Carter	TN	56,356	341		
Cheatham	TN	41,072	303		
Chester	TN	17,341	289		
Claiborne	TN	32,043	434		
Clay	TN	7,581	236		
Cocke	TN	35,999	434		
Coffee	TN	57,889	429		
Crockett	TN	13,911	265		
Cumberland	TN	61,145	682		
Davidson	TN	715,884	502		
Decatur	TN	11,435	333		
DeKalb	TN	20,080	304		
Dickson	TN	54,315	490		
Dyer	TN	36,801	510		
Fayette	TN	41,990	705		
Fentress	TN	18,489	499		
Franklin	TN	42,774	553		
Gibson	TN	50,429	603		
Giles	TN	30,346	611		
Grainger	TN	23,527	280		
Greene	TN	70,152	622		
Grundy	TN	13,529	361		
Hamblen	TN	64,499	161		
Hamilton	TN	366,207	543		
Hancock	TN	6,662	222		
Hardeman	TN	25,462	668		
Hardin	TN	26,831	578		
Hawkins	TN	56,721	487		
Haywood	TN	17,864	533		
Henderson	TN	27,842	520		
Henry	TN	32,199	562		
Hickman	TN	24,925	613		
Houston	TN	8,283	200		
Humphreys	TN	18,990	532		
Jackson	TN	11,617	309		
Jefferson	TN	54,683	274		
Johnson	TN	17,948	299		
Knox	TN	478,971	509		
Lake	TN	7,005	163		
Lauderdale	TN	25,143	470		
Lawrence	TN	44,159	617		
Lewis	TN	12,582	282		
Lincoln	TN	35,319	570		
Loudon	TN	54,886	229		
Macon	TN	25,216	500		
Madison	TN	98,823	375		
Marion	TN	28,837	613		
Marshall	TN	34,318	430		
Maury	TN	100,974	560		
McMinn	TN	53,276	430		
McNairy	TN	25,866	557		
Meigs	TN	12,758	195		
Monroe	TN	46,250	635		
Montgomery	TN	220,069	539		
Moore	TN	6,461	129		
Morgan	TN	21,035	522		
Obion	TN	30,787	545		
Overton	TN	22,511	433		
Perry	TN	8,366	415		
Pickett	TN	5,001	163		
Polk	TN	17,544	435		
Putnam	TN	79,854	401		
Rhea	TN	32,870	316		
Roane	TN	53,404	361		
Robertson	TN	72,803	477		
Rutherford	TN	341,486	619		
Scott	TN	21,850	532		
Sequatchie	TN	15,826	266		
Sevier	TN	98,380	592		
Shelby	TN	929,744	755		
Smith	TN	19,904	314		
Stewart	TN	13,657	458		
Sullivan	TN	158,163	413		
Sumner	TN	196,281	529		
Tipton	TN	60,970	459		
Trousdale	TN	11,615	114		
Unicoi	TN	17,928	186		
Union	TN	19,802	224		
Van Buren	TN	6,168	247		
Warren	TN	40,953	433		
Washington	TN	133,001	326		
Wayne	TN	16,232	734		
Weakley	TN	32,902	580		
White	TN	27,351	377		
Williamson	TN	247,726	582		
Wilson	TN	147,737	571		
Anderson	TX	57,922	1071		
Andrews	TX	18,610	1501		
Angelina	TX	86,395	802		
Aransas	TX	23,830	252		
Archer	TX	8,560	910		
Armstrong	TX	1,848	914		
Atascosa	TX	48,981	1232		
Austin	TX	30,167	653		
Bailey	TX	6,904	827		
Bandera	TX	20,851	792		
Bastrop	TX	97,216	888		
Baylor	TX	3,465	871		
Bee	TX	31,047	880		
Bell	TX	370,647	1059		
Bexar	TX	2,009,324	1247		
Blanco	TX	11,374	711		
Borden	TX	631	899		
Bosque	TX	18,235	989		
Bowie	TX	92,893	888		
Brazoria	TX	372,031	1387		
Brazos	TX	233,849	586		
Brewster	TX	9,546	6193		
Briscoe	TX	1,435	900		
Brooks	TX	7,076	943		
Brown	TX	38,095	944		
Burleson	TX	17,642	666		
Burnet	TX	49,130	995		
Caldwell	TX	45,883	546		
Calhoun	TX	20,106	512		
Callahan	TX	13,708	899		
Cameron	TX	421,017	906		
Camp	TX	12,464	196		
Carson	TX	5,807	923		
Cass	TX	28,454	938		
Castro	TX	7,371	898		
Chambers	TX	46,571	599		
Cherokee	TX	50,412	1052		
Childress	TX	6,664	710		
Clay	TX	10,218	1098		
Cochran	TX	2,547	775		
Coke	TX	3,285	899		
Coleman	TX	7,684	1273		
Collin	TX	1,064,465	848		
Collingsworth	TX	2,652	919		
Colorado	TX	20,557	963		
Comal	TX	161,501	562		
Comanche	TX	13,594	938		
Concho	TX	3,303	992		
Cooke	TX	41,668	875		
Coryell	TX	83,093	1052		
Cottle	TX	1,380	901		
Crane	TX	4,675	786		
Crockett	TX	3,098	2808		
Crosby	TX	5,133	900		
Culberson	TX	2,188	3813		
Dallam	TX	7,115	1505		
Dallas	TX	2,613,539	880		
Dawson	TX	12,456	902		
Deaf Smith	TX	18,583	1497		
Delta	TX	5,230	277		
Denton	TX	906,422	888		
DeWitt	TX	19,824	909		
Dickens	TX	1,770	904		
Dimmit	TX	8,615	1331		
Donley	TX	3,258	930		
Duval	TX	9,831	1793		
Eastland	TX	17,725	926		
Ector	TX	165,171	901		
Edwards	TX	1,422	2120		
El Paso	TX	865,657	1013		
Ellis	TX	192,455	940		
Erath	TX	42,545	1086		
Falls	TX	16,968	769		
Fannin	TX	35,662	892		
Fayette	TX	24,435	950		
Fisher	TX	3,672	901		
Floyd	TX	5,402	992		
Foard	TX	1,095	707		
Fort Bend	TX	822,779	875		
Franklin	TX	10,359	286		
Freestone	TX	19,435	885		
Frio	TX	18,385	1133		
Gaines	TX	21,598	1502		
Galveston	TX	350,682	399		
Garza	TX	5,816	896		
Gillespie	TX	26,725	1061		
Glasscock	TX	1,116	901		
Goliad	TX	7,012	854		
Gonzales	TX	19,653	1068		
Gray	TX	21,227	928		
Grayson	TX	135,543	934		
Gregg	TX	124,239	274		
Grimes	TX	29,268	794		
Guadalupe	TX	172,706	711		
Hale	TX	32,522	1005		
Hall	TX	2,825	903		
Hamilton	TX	8,222	836		
Hansford	TX	5,285	920		
Hardeman	TX	3,549	695		
Hardin	TX	56,231	894		
Harris	TX	4,731,145	1729		
Harrison	TX	68,839	899		
Hartley	TX	5,382	1462		
Haskell	TX	5,416	903		
Hays	TX	241,067	678		
Hemphill	TX	3,382	910		
Henderson	TX	82,150	874		
Hidalgo	TX	870,781	1569		
Hill	TX	35,874	962		
Hockley	TX	21,537	908		
Hood	TX	61,598	422		
Hopkins	TX	36,787	785		
Houston	TX	22,066	1231		
Howard	TX	34,860	903		
Hudspeth	TX	3,202	4571		
Hunt	TX	99,956	841		
Hutchinson	TX	20,617	887		
Irion	TX	1,513	1052		
Jack	TX	8,472	917		
Jackson	TX	14,988	830		
Jasper	TX	32,980	938		
Jeff Davis	TX	1,996	2265		
Jefferson	TX	256,526	904		
Jim Hogg	TX	4,838	1136		
Jim Wells	TX	38,891	865		
Johnson	TX	179,927	729		
Jones	TX	19,663	931		
Karnes	TX	14,710	750		
Kaufman	TX	145,310	786		
Kendall	TX	44,279	662		
Kenedy	TX	350	1457		
Kent	TX	753	902		
Kerr	TX	52,598	1106		
Kimble	TX	4,286	1251		
King	TX	265	912		
Kinney	TX	3,129	1364		
Kleberg	TX	31,040	871		
Knox	TX	3,353	854		
La Salle	TX	6,664	1489		
Lamar	TX	50,088	917		
Lamb	TX	13,045	1016		
Lampasas	TX	21,627	712		
Lavaca	TX	20,337	970		
Lee	TX	17,478	629		
Leon	TX	15,719	1072		
Liberty	TX	91,628	1160		
Limestone	TX	22,146	909		
Lipscomb	TX	3,059	932		
Live Oak	TX	11,335	1036		
Llano	TX	21,243	935		
Loving	TX	64	673		
Lubbock	TX	310,639	900		
Lynn	TX	5,596	892		
Madison	TX	13,455	472		
Marion	TX	9,725	381		
Martin	TX	5,237	915		
Mason	TX	3,953	932		
Matagorda	TX	36,255	1114		
Maverick	TX	57,887	1280		
McCulloch	TX	7,630	1069		
McLennan	TX	260,579	1042		
McMullen	TX	600	1113		
Medina	TX	50,748	1328		
Menard	TX	1,962	902		
Midland	TX	169,983	900		
Milam	TX	24,754	1017		
Mills	TX	4,456	748		
Mitchell	TX	8,990	910		
Montague	TX	19,965	931		
Montgomery	TX	620,443	1044		
Moore	TX	21,358	900		
Morris	TX	11,973	254		
Motley	TX	1,063	989		
Nacogdoches	TX	64,653	947		
Navarro	TX	52,624	1071		
Newton	TX	12,217	933		
Nolan	TX	14,738	912		
Nueces	TX	353,178	836		
Ochiltree	TX	10,015	918		
Oldham	TX	1,758	1501		
Orange	TX	84,808	356		
Palo Pinto	TX	28,409	953		
Panola	TX	22,491	801		
Parker	TX	148,222	904		
Parmer	TX	9,869	882		
Pecos	TX	15,193	4764		
Polk	TX	50,123	1057		
Potter	TX	118,525	909		
Presidio	TX	6,131	3856		
Rains	TX	12,164	259		
Randall	TX	140,753	914		
Reagan	TX	3,385	1175		
Real	TX	2,758	700		
Red River	TX	11,587	1050		
Reeves	TX	14,748	2636		
Refugio	TX	6,741	770		
Roberts	TX	827	924		
Robertson	TX	16,757	855		
Rockwall	TX	107,819	149		
Runnels	TX	9,900	1054		
Rusk	TX	52,214	924		
Sabine	TX	9,894	490		
San Augustine	TX	7,918	528		
San Jacinto	TX	27,402	571		
San Patricio	TX	68,755	692		
San Saba	TX	5,730	1134		
Schleicher	TX	2,451	1311		
Scurry	TX	16,932	903		
Shackelford	TX	3,105	914		
Shelby	TX	24,022	794		
Sherman	TX	2,782	923		
Smith	TX	233,479	928		
Somervell	TX	9,205	187		
Starr	TX	65,920	1223		
Stephens	TX	9,101	895		
Sterling	TX	1,372	923		
Stonewall	TX	1,245	919		
Sutton	TX	3,372	1454		
Swisher	TX	6,971	900		
Tarrant	TX	2,110,640	864		
Taylor	TX	143,208	916		
Terrell	TX	760	2358		
Terry	TX	11,831	890		
Throckmorton	TX	1,440	912		
Titus	TX	31,247	411		
Tom Green	TX	120,003	1522		
Travis	TX	1,290,188	989		
Trinity	TX	13,602	693		
Tyler	TX	19,798	923		
Upshur	TX	40,892	588		
Upton	TX	3,308	1242		
Uvalde	TX	24,564	1557		
Val Verde	TX	47,586	3171		
Van Zandt	TX	59,541	849		
Victoria	TX	91,319	883		
Walker	TX	76,400	788		
Waller	TX	56,794	514		
Ward	TX	11,644	836		
Washington	TX	35,805	609		
Webb	TX	267,114	3357		
Wharton	TX	41,570	1090		
Wheeler	TX	4,990	914		
Wichita	TX	129,350	628		
Wilbarger	TX	12,887	971		
Willacy	TX	20,164	597		
Williamson	TX	609,017	1124		
Wilson	TX	49,753	807		
Winkler	TX	7,791	841		
Wise	TX	68,632	905		
Wood	TX	44,843	650		
Yoakum	TX	7,694	800		
Young	TX	17,867	922		
Zapata	TX	13,889	997		
Zavala	TX	9,670	1299		
Baker Island	UM	0	0.58		(Note: Part of the Minor Outlying Islands. Any recorded population is not permanent and consists of military or scientific personnel.)
Howland Island	UM	0	0.62		
Jarvis Island	UM	0	1.7		
Johnston Atoll	UM	0	1.02		
Kingman Reef	UM	0	0.01		
Midway Islands	UM	40	2.4		
Navassa Island	UM	0	2.1		
Palmyra Atoll	UM	20	4.59		
Wake Island	UM	100	2.5		
Saint Croix Island	VI	50,601	84		
Saint John Island	VI	4,170	20		
Saint Thomas Island	VI	51,634	32		
Beaver	UT	7,072	2592		
Box Elder	UT	57,666	6729		
Cache	UT	133,154	1173		
Carbon	UT	20,412	1485		
Daggett	UT	935	721		
Davis	UT	362,679	634		
Duchesne	UT	19,596	3256		
Emery	UT	9,825	4472		
Garfield	UT	5,083	5208		
Grand	UT	9,669	3684		
Iron	UT	57,289	3301		
Juab	UT	11,786	3406		
Kane	UT	7,667	4109		
Millard	UT	12,975	6828		
Morgan	UT	12,295	611		
Piute	UT	1,438	766		
Rich	UT	2,510	1086		
Salt Lake	UT	1,185,238	807		
San Juan	UT	14,518	7933		
Sanpete	UT	28,437	1603		
Sevier	UT	21,522	1918		
Summit	UT	42,357	1882		
Tooele	UT	72,698	7286		
Uintah	UT	35,620	4501		
Utah	UT	659,399	2144		
Wasatch	UT	34,788	1206		
Washington	UT	180,279	2430		
Wayne	UT	2,486	2466		
Weber	UT	262,223	659		
Addison	VT	37,363	766		
Bennington	VT	37,347	675		
Caledonia	VT	30,233	649		
Chittenden	VT	168,323	537		
Essex	VT	5,920	664		
Franklin	VT	49,946	634		
Grand Isle	VT	7,293	195		
Lamoille	VT	25,945	459		
Orange	VT	29,277	687		
Orleans	VT	27,393	693		
Rutland	VT	60,572	930		
Washington	VT	59,807	687		
Windham	VT	45,905	785		
Windsor	VT	57,753	969		
Accomack	VA	33,413	455	10 Sep 1663	
Albemarle	VA	112,395	723	31 Dec 1744	
Alleghany	VA	15,223	446	1822	
Amelia	VA	13,265	357	1734	
Amherst	VA	31,307	475	1761	
Appomattox	VA	16,119	334	1845	
Arlington	VA	238,643	26	1801	
Augusta	VA	77,487	971	1738	
Bath	VA	4,209	532	1790	
Bedford	VA	79,462	755	1753	
Bland	VA	6,270	359	1861	
Botetourt	VA	33,596	543	1769	
Brunswick	VA	15,849	566	1720	
Buchanan	VA	20,355	504	1858	
Buckingham	VA	16,824	581	1761	
Campbell	VA	55,696	504	1781	
Caroline	VA	30,887	533	1727	
Carroll	VA	29,155	476	1842	
Charles City	VA	6,773	182	1634	
Charlotte	VA	11,529	475	1764	
Chesterfield	VA	364,548	426	1748	
Clarke	VA	14,783	177	1836	
Craig	VA	4,892	330	1850	
Culpeper	VA	52,552	381	1748	
Cumberland	VA	9,675	298	1748	
Dickenson	VA	14,124	333	1880	
Dinwiddie	VA	27,947	504	1752	
Essex	VA	10,599	258	1691	
Fairfax	VA	1,150,309	396	1742	
Fauquier	VA	72,972	650	1759	
Floyd	VA	15,476	382	1831	
Fluvanna	VA	27,249	287	1777	
Franklin	VA	54,477	692	1785	
Frederick	VA	91,419	415	1738	
Giles	VA	16,787	358	1806	
Gloucester	VA	38,711	217	1652	
Goochland	VA	24,727	284	1727	
Grayson	VA	15,333	443	1792	
Greene	VA	20,552	157	1838	
Greensville	VA	11,391	296	1780	
Halifax	VA	34,022	814	1752	
Hanover	VA	109,979	473	1720	
Henrico	VA	334,389	238	1634	
Henry	VA	50,948	382	1776	
Highland	VA	2,232	416	1847	
Isle of Wight	VA	38,606	316	1634	
James City	VA	78,254	143	1634	
King and Queen	VA	6,608	316	1691	
King George	VA	26,723	180	1720	
King William	VA	17,810	275	1701	
Lancaster	VA	10,919	133	1651	
Lee	VA	22,173	437	1792	
Loudoun	VA	420,959	520	1757	
Louisa	VA	37,596	498	1742	
Lunenburg	VA	11,936	432	1745	
Madison	VA	13,837	322	1792	
Mathews	VA	8,533	86	1790	
Mecklenburg	VA	30,319	624	1764	
Middlesex	VA	10,625	130	1675	
Montgomery	VA	99,721	388	1776	
Nelson	VA	14,775	472	1807	
New Kent	VA	22,945	210	1654	
Northampton	VA	12,282	207	1634	
Northumberland	VA	11,839	192	1648	
Nottoway	VA	15,642	315	1788	
Orange	VA	36,254	342	1734	
Page	VA	23,709	311	1831	
Patrick	VA	17,608	483	1790	
Pittsylvania	VA	60,501	978	1767	
Powhatan	VA	30,333	261	1777	
Prince Edward	VA	21,849	353	1753	
Prince George	VA	43,010	266	1702	
Prince William	VA	482,204	338	1730	
Pulaski	VA	33,800	321	1839	
Rappahannock	VA	7,348	267	1831	
Richmond	VA	8,923	192	1692	
Roanoke	VA	96,929	251	1838	
Rockbridge	VA	22,650	600	1778	
Rockingham	VA	83,757	851	1778	
Russell	VA	25,781	475	1785	
Scott	VA	21,576	537	1814	
Shenandoah	VA	44,186	512	1772	
Smyth	VA	29,800	452	1831	
Southampton	VA	17,996	600	1748	
Spotsylvania	VA	140,032	401	1720	
Stafford	VA	156,927	270	1666	
Surry	VA	6,561	279	1652	
Sussex	VA	10,829	491	1754	
Tazewell	VA	40,429	520	1799	
Warren	VA	40,727	214	1837	
Washington	VA	53,935	564	1776	
Westmoreland	VA	18,477	229	1653	
Wise	VA	36,130	403	1855	
Wythe	VA	28,290	463	1790	
York	VA	70,045	106	1634	
Alexandria, City of	VA	159,467	15	1847	(Note: One of the 38 independent cities of Virginia.)
Bristol, City of	VA	17,219	12	1890	
Buena Vista, City of	VA	6,641	7	1892	
Charlottesville, City of	VA	46,553	10	1762	
Chesapeake, City of	VA	249,422	341	1963	
Colonial Heights, City of	VA	18,170	8	1948	
Covington, City of	VA	5,737	4	1952	
Danville, City of	VA	42,590	43	1890	
Emporia, City of	VA	5,766	7	1967	
Fairfax, City of	VA	24,146	6	1961	
Falls Church, City of	VA	14,658	2.1	1948	
Franklin, City of	VA	8,180	8	1961	
Fredericksburg, City of	VA	27,982	10	1879	
Galax, City of	VA	6,720	8	1953	
Hampton, City of	VA	137,148	52	1849	
Harrisonburg, City of	VA	51,814	18	1916	
Hopewell, City of	VA	23,033	10	1916	
Lexington, City of	VA	7,320	2.5	1966	
Lynchburg, City of	VA	79,009	49	1896	
Manassas, City of	VA	42,772	10	1976	
Manassas Park, City of	VA	17,219	2.5	1975	
Martinsville, City of	VA	13,485	11	1942	
Newport News, City of	VA	186,247	68	1896	
Norfolk, City of	VA	238,005	54	1691	
Norton, City of	VA	3,687	7	1954	
Petersburg, City of	VA	33,458	23	1874	
Poquoson, City of	VA	12,460	16	1975	
Portsmouth, City of	VA	97,915	33	1908	
Radford, City of	VA	16,070	10	1892	
Richmond, City of	VA	226,610	60	1842	
Roanoke, City of	VA	100,011	43	1884	
Salem, City of	VA	25,346	15	1967	
Staunton, City of	VA	25,750	20	1871	
Suffolk, City of	VA	94,324	400	1973	
Virginia Beach, City of	VA	459,470	248	1963	
Waynesboro, City of	VA	22,196	14	1948	
Williamsburg, City of	VA	15,425	9	1884	
Winchester, City of	VA	28,120	9	1874	
Adams	WA	20,613	1925		
Asotin	WA	22,285	636		
Benton	WA	206,873	1700		
Chelan	WA	79,074	2920		
Clallam	WA	77,155	1738		
Clark	WA	503,311	629		
Columbia	WA	3,952	869		
Cowlitz	WA	110,730	1139		
Douglas	WA	42,938	1819		
Ferry	WA	7,178	2204		
Franklin	WA	96,749	1242		
Garfield	WA	2,286	710		
Grant	WA	99,123	2680		
Grays Harbor	WA	75,636	1902		
Island	WA	86,857	209		
Jefferson	WA	32,977	1804		
King	WA	2,269,675	2115		
Kitsap	WA	275,611	395		
Kittitas	WA	44,337	2297		
Klickitat	WA	22,735	1872		
Lewis	WA	82,149	2403		
Lincoln	WA	10,876	2311		
Mason	WA	65,726	959		
Okanogan	WA	42,104	5268		
Pacific	WA	23,365	933		
Pend Oreille	WA	13,401	1400		
Pierce	WA	921,130	1670		
San Juan	WA	17,788	174		
Skagit	WA	129,523	1731		
Skamania	WA	12,036	1656		
Snohomish	WA	827,957	2087		
Spokane	WA	539,339	1764		
Stevens	WA	46,445	2478		
Thurston	WA	294,793	722		
Wahkiakum	WA	4,422	264		
Walla Walla	WA	62,584	1270		
Whatcom	WA	226,847	2107		
Whitman	WA	47,973	2159		
Yakima	WA	256,728	4296		
Barbour	WV	15,465	341		
Berkeley	WV	122,076	321		
Boone	WV	21,809	503		
Braxton	WV	12,447	514		
Brooke	WV	22,559	89		
Cabell	WV	94,350	282		
Calhoun	WV	6,229	281		
Clay	WV	8,051	342		
Doddridge	WV	7,808	320		
Fayette	WV	40,488	664		
Gilmer	WV	7,408	340		
Grant	WV	10,976	477		
Greenbrier	WV	32,977	1021		
Hampshire	WV	23,093	642		
Hancock	WV	29,095	83		
Hardy	WV	14,299	583		
Harrison	WV	65,921	416		
Jackson	WV	27,791	466		
Jefferson	WV	57,701	210		
Kanawha	WV	180,745	903		
Lewis	WV	17,033	389		
Lincoln	WV	20,463	438		
Logan	WV	32,567	454		
Marion	WV	56,205	307		
Marshall	WV	30,591	432		
Mason	WV	25,453	535		
McDowell	WV	19,111	534		
Mercer	WV	59,664	420		
Mineral	WV	26,938	328		
Mingo	WV	23,568	423		
Monongalia	WV	105,822	361		
Monroe	WV	12,376	473		
Morgan	WV	17,063	229		
Nicholas	WV	24,604	649		
Ohio	WV	42,425	106		
Pendleton	WV	6,143	698		
Pleasants	WV	7,653	131		
Pocahontas	WV	7,869	940		
Preston	WV	34,216	648		
Putnam	WV	57,440	346		
Raleigh	WV	74,591	607		
Randolph	WV	27,932	1040		
Ritchie	WV	8,444	454		
Roane	WV	14,028	484		
Summers	WV	11,959	361		
Taylor	WV	16,705	173		
Tucker	WV	6,762	419		
Tyler	WV	8,313	258		
Upshur	WV	23,816	355		
Wayne	WV	38,982	506		
Webster	WV	8,378	556		
Wetzel	WV	14,442	359		
Wirt	WV	5,194	233		
Wood	WV	84,296	367		
Wyoming	WV	21,382	501		
Adams	WI	20,654	645.65	Apr 1853	
Ashland	WI	16,027	1045.04	27 Mar 1860	
Barron	WI	46,711	862.71	1859	
Bayfield	WI	16,220	1477.86	1845	
Brown	WI	268,740	529.71	1818	
Buffalo	WI	13,317	671.64	1853	
Burnett	WI	16,526	821.85	1856	
Calumet	WI	52,442	318.24	1836	
Chippewa	WI	66,297	1008.37	1845	
Clark	WI	34,659	1209.82	1853	
Columbia	WI	58,490	765.53	1846	
Crawford	WI	16,113	570.66	1818	
Dane	WI	561,504	1197.24	1836	
Dodge	WI	89,396	875.63	1836	
Door	WI	30,066	481.98	1851	
Douglas	WI	44,295	1304.14	8 Feb 1854	
Dunn	WI	45,440	850.11	1854	
Eau Claire	WI	105,710	637.98	6 Oct 1856	
Florence	WI	4,558	488.2	1882	
Fond du Lac	WI	104,154	719.55	1836	
Forest	WI	9,179	1014.07	1885	
Grant	WI	51,938	1146.85	1837	
Green	WI	37,093	583.96	1837	
Green Lake	WI	19,018	349.44	1858	
Iowa	WI	23,709	762.58	1830	
Iron	WI	6,137	758.17	1893	
Jackson	WI	21,145	987.72	1853	
Jefferson	WI	84,900	556.47	1836	
Juneau	WI	26,718	766.93	1857	
Kenosha	WI	169,151	271.99	30 Jan 1850	
Kewaunee	WI	20,563	342.52	1852	
La Crosse	WI	120,784	451.69	1851	
Lafayette	WI	16,611	633.59	1846	
Langlade	WI	19,491	870.64	3 Mar 1879	
Lincoln	WI	28,415	878.97	1875	
Manitowoc	WI	81,359	589.08	1836	
Marathon	WI	138,013	1544.98	1850	
Marinette	WI	41,872	1399.35	1879	
Marquette	WI	15,592	455.6	1836	
Menominee	WI	4,255	357.61	3 Jul 1959	
Milwaukee	WI	939,489	241.4	1834	
Monroe	WI	46,274	900.78	1854	
Oconto	WI	38,965	997.99	1851	
Oneida	WI	37,845	1112.97	1887	
Outagamie	WI	190,705	637.52	1851	
Ozaukee	WI	91,503	233.08	1853	
Pepin	WI	7,318	231.98	25 Feb 1858	
Pierce	WI	42,212	573.75	1853	
Polk	WI	44,977	913.96	1853	
Portage	WI	70,377	800.68	1836	
Price	WI	14,054	1254.38	3 Mar 1879	
Racine	WI	197,727	332.5	7 Dec 1836	
Richland	WI	17,304	586.15	1842	
Rock	WI	163,687	718.14	7 Dec 1836	
Rusk	WI	14,188	913.59	1901	
St. Croix	WI	93,536	830.9	1840	
Sauk	WI	65,763	1257.31	1840	
Sawyer	WI	18,074	893.06	1883	
Shawano	WI	40,881	511.27	16 Feb 1853	
Sheboygan	WI	118,034	722.33	1836	
Taylor	WI	19,913	974.88	1875	
Trempealeau	WI	30,760	732.97	1854	
Vernon	WI	30,714	791.58	1 Mar 1851	
Vilas	WI	23,047	856.6	12 Apr 1893	
Walworth	WI	106,478	555.13	1836	
Washburn	WI	16,623	797.11	1883	
Washington	WI	136,761	430.7	7 Dec 1836	
Waukesha	WI	406,978	549.57	Jan 1846	
Waupaca	WI	51,812	747.71	1851	
Waushara	WI	24,520	626.15	15 Feb 1851	
Winnebago	WI	171,730	434.49	1840	
Wood	WI	74,207	793.12	1856	
Albany	WY	37,066	4274	16 Dec 1868	
Big Horn	WY	11,521	3137	12 Mar 1890	
Campbell	WY	47,026	4797	21 Feb 1911	
Carbon	WY	14,537	7897	16 Dec 1868	
Converse	WY	13,751	4255	9 Mar 1888	
Crook	WY	7,181	2859	8 Dec 1875	
Fremont	WY	39,234	9183	5 Mar 1884	
Goshen	WY	12,498	2225	21 Feb 1911	
Hot Springs	WY	4,621	2004	21 Feb 1911	
Johnson	WY	8,447	4166	8 Dec 1875	
Laramie	WY	100,512	2686	9 Jan 1867	
Lincoln	WY	19,581	4069	21 Feb 1911	
Natrona	WY	79,955	5340	9 Mar 1888	
Niobrara	WY	2,467	2626	21 Feb 1911	
Park	WY	29,624	6943	15 Feb 1909	
Platte	WY	8,605	2085	21 Feb 1911	
Sheridan	WY	30,921	2523	9 Mar 1888	
Sublette	WY	8,728	4882	15 Feb 1921	
Sweetwater	WY	42,272	10426	17 Dec 1867	
Teton	WY	23,331	4008	15 Feb 1921	
Uinta	WY	20,450	2082	1 Dec 1869	
Washakie	WY	7,685	2240	21 Feb 1911	
Weston	WY	6,838	2398	12 Mar 1890	

== See also ==
- Outline of the United States
- Index of U.S. counties
- Lists of counties in the United States
- List of former United States counties
- List of FIPS state codes
- List of United States FIPS codes by county
- United States Office of Management and Budget
  - Statistical area (United States)
    - Combined statistical area (list)
    - Core-based statistical area (list)
      - Metropolitan statistical area (list)
      - Micropolitan statistical area (list)
