= List of the most common U.S. county names =

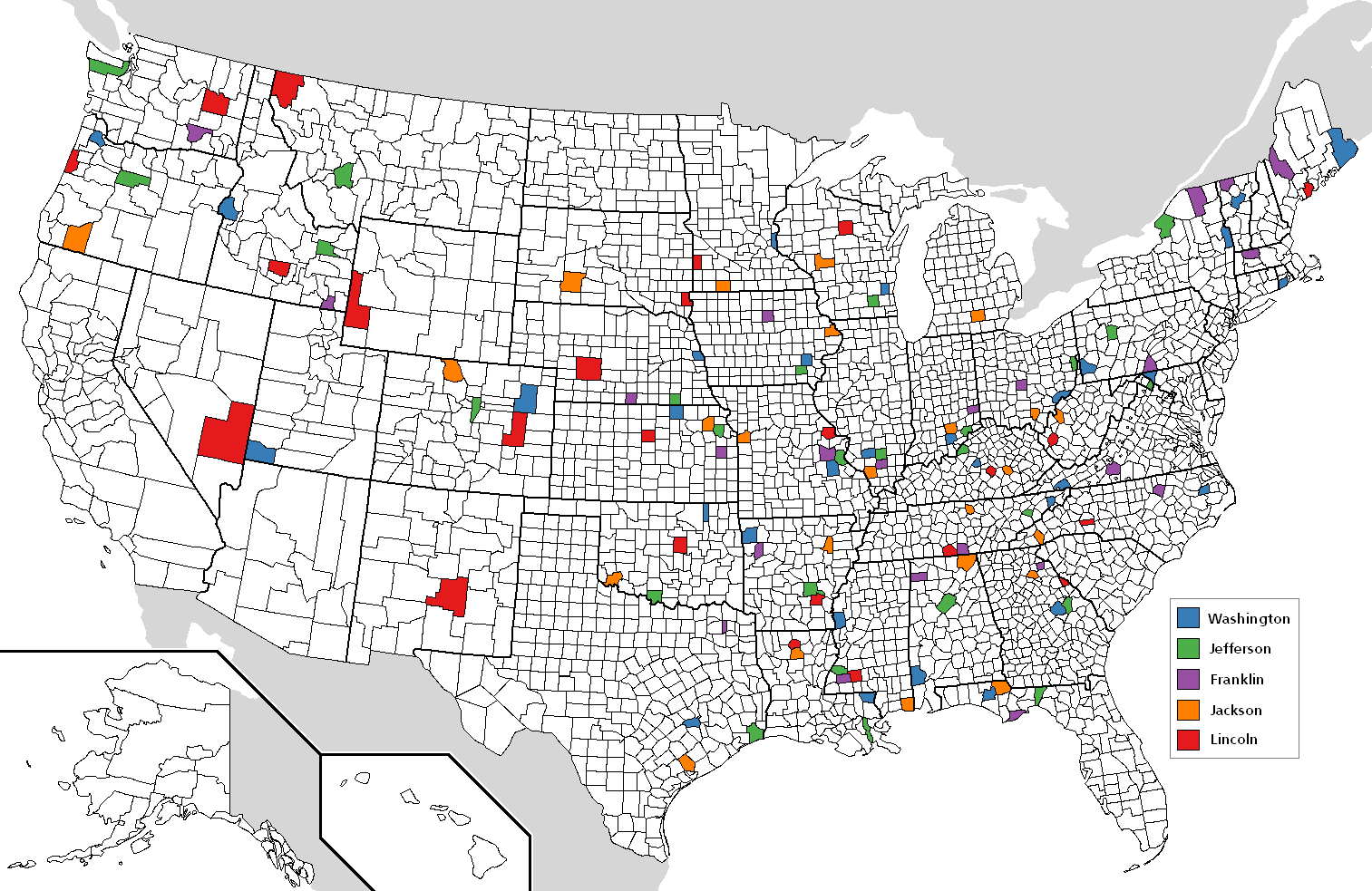
Location of counties with the five most popular names

This is a list of U.S. county names that are used in two or more states. Ranked are the 428 most common county names, which are shared by counties in two or more states each, accounting for 1,730 of the 3,140 counties and county-equivalents in the United States.

== List ==
| Number | Name of county | Count | Most commonly named after |
|---|---|---|---|
| 1 | Washington County | 31 | George Washington |
| 2 | Jefferson County | 26 | Thomas Jefferson |
| 3 | Franklin County | 25 | Benjamin Franklin |
| 4 | Jackson County | 24 | Andrew Jackson |
| 4 | Lincoln County | 24 | Abraham Lincoln, Benjamin Lincoln (5) |
| 6 | Madison County | 20 | James Madison |
| 7 | Clay County | 18 | Henry Clay |
| 7 | Montgomery County | 18 | Richard Montgomery |
| 7 | Union County | 18 | The Union of the States or union of parts of adjoining counties |
| 10 | Marion County | 17 | Francis Marion |
| 10 | Monroe County | 17 | James Monroe |
| 12 | Greene County | 16 | Nathanael Greene. See also Green County. |
| 12 | Wayne County | 16 | Anthony Wayne |
| 14 | Grant County | 15 | Ulysses S. Grant |
| 15 | Warren County | 14 | Joseph Warren |
| 16 | Carroll County | 13 | Charles Carroll of Carrollton |
| 17 | Adams County | 12 | John Adams or John Quincy Adams |
| 17 | Clark County | 12 | William Clark or George Rogers Clark. See also Clarke County. |
| 17 | Douglas County | 12 | Stephen A. Douglas |
| 17 | Johnson County | 12 | Richard M. Johnson |
| 17 | Lake County | 12 | Geographical feature |
| 17 | Lee County | 12 | Robert E. Lee or Henry "Light-Horse Harry" Lee |
| 17 | Marshall County | 12 | John Marshall |
| 17 | Polk County | 12 | James K. Polk |
| 25 | Calhoun County | 11 | John C. Calhoun |
| 25 | Crawford County | 11 | William H. Crawford or Col. William Crawford |
| 25 | Fayette County | 11 | Marquis de la Fayette |
| 25 | Lawrence County | 11 | James Lawrence |
| 25 | Morgan County | 11 | Daniel Morgan |
| 25 | Scott County | 11 | Winfield Scott or Charles Scott |
| 31 | Hamilton County | 10 | Alexander Hamilton |
| 31 | Hancock County | 10 | John Hancock |
| 31 | Henry County | 10 | Patrick Henry or Col. Henry Dodge (Iowa) |
| 31 | Logan County | 10 | John A. Logan or Benjamin Logan |
| 31 | Perry County | 10 | Oliver Hazard Perry |
| 31 | Pike County | 10 | Zebulon Pike |
| 37 | Benton County | 9 | Thomas Hart Benton |
| 37 | Brown County | 9 | Jacob Brown |
| 37 | Cass County | 9 | Lewis Cass or George Washington Cass |
| 37 | Clinton County | 9 | George Clinton or DeWitt Clinton |
| 37 | Knox County | 9 | Henry Knox |
| 37 | Putnam County | 9 | Israel Putnam |
| 37 | Shelby County | 9 | Isaac Shelby |
| 44 | Boone County | 8 | Daniel Boone |
| 44 | Butler County | 8 | William O. Butler or Richard Butler |
| 44 | Cherokee County | 8 | Cherokee tribe |
| 44 | Columbia County | 8 | Columbia (poetic name for America) |
| 44 | Cumberland County | 8 | Prince William, Duke of Cumberland |
| 44 | Fulton County | 8 | Robert Fulton |
| 44 | Harrison County | 8 | William Henry Harrison |
| 44 | Jasper County | 8 | William Jasper |
| 44 | Mercer County | 8 | Hugh Mercer |
| 44 | Orange County | 8 | the fruit or Prince of Orange |
| 44 | Randolph County | 8 | Edmund Randolph or John Randolph of Roanoke |
| 44 | Webster County | 8 | Daniel Webster |
| 56 | Howard County | 7 | Tilghman Howard, John Eager Howard, or Oliver Otis Howard |
| 56 | Lewis County | 7 | Meriwether Lewis or Morgan Lewis (New York) |
| 56 | Pulaski County | 7 | Kazimierz Pułaski |
| 56 | Richland County | 7 | Fertile soil (6) |
| 56 | Taylor County | 7 | Zachary Taylor |
| 61 | Custer County | 6 | George Armstrong Custer |
| 61 | DeKalb County | 6 | Johann de Kalb |
| 61 | Delaware County | 6 | Delaware (tribe) (3) |
| 61 | Lafayette County | 6 | Marquis de Lafayette |
| 61 | Floyd County | 6 | John Floyd |
| 61 | Garfield County | 6 | James A. Garfield |
| 61 | Hardin County | 6 | John Hardin, John J. Hardin, or Joseph Hardin Sr. |
| 61 | Jones County | 6 | Each county is named after a different person. |
| 61 | Livingston County | 6 | Edward Livingston (4) |
| 61 | Macon County | 6 | Nathaniel Macon |
| 61 | Martin County | 6 | Each county is named after a different person. |
| 61 | Mason County | 6 | George Mason (3) |
| 61 | Newton County | 6 | Sgt. John Newton (4) |
| 61 | Sullivan County | 6 | John Sullivan |
| 75 | Allen County | 5 | John Allen |
| 75 | Anderson County | 5 | Each county is named after a different person. |
| 75 | Caldwell County | 5 | John Caldwell (2) |
| 75 | Campbell County | 5 | Robert Campbell (Wyoming) |
| 75 | Carter County | 5 | Each county is named after a different person. |
| 75 | Dallas County | 5 | Alexander J. Dallas (Alabama); George M. Dallas |
| 75 | Decatur County | 5 | Stephen Decatur |
| 75 | Essex County | 5 | County of Essex in England |
| 75 | Henderson County | 5 | Richard Henderson (2) |
| 75 | Houston County | 5 | Sam Houston; George S. Houston; John Houstoun |
| 75 | Kent County | 5 | County of Kent in England |
| 75 | Lyon County | 5 | Nathaniel Lyon, except for Lyon County, Kentucky, which is named for Chittenden Lyon |
| 75 | Mitchell County | 5 | Each county is named after a different person. |
| 75 | Pierce County | 5 | Franklin Pierce |
| 75 | Saline County | 5 | Saltwater springs; the Saline River |
| 75 | Sheridan County | 5 | Philip Sheridan |
| 75 | White County | 5 | Isaac White (2) |
| 75 | York County | 5 | James, Duke of York (later King James II); city of York, England |
| 94 | Adair County | 4 | John Adair |
| 94 | Allegheny County | 4 | Allegheny Mountains and Allegheny River |
| 94 | Blaine County | 4 | James Blaine |
| 94 | Camden County | 4 | Charles Pratt, 1st Earl Camden |
| 94 | Carbon County | 4 | Coal deposits |
| 94 | Dawson County | 4 | Each county is named after a different person. |
| 94 | Dodge County | 4 | Henry Dodge |
| 94 | Fremont County | 4 | John C. Frémont |
| 94 | Grundy County | 4 | Felix Grundy |
| 94 | Iron County | 4 | Iron ore deposits |
| 94 | Lamar County | 4 | Lucius Quintus Cincinnatus Lamar (3) |
| 94 | Lancaster County | 4 | Lancaster, Lancashire |
| 94 | Liberty County | 4 | Liberty |
| 94 | Linn County | 4 | Lewis F. Linn |
| 94 | Middlesex County | 4 | Historic county of Middlesex in England |
| 94 | Mineral County | 4 | Mineral deposits |
| 94 | Ottawa County | 4 | Odawa people |
| 94 | Phillips County | 4 | Each county is named after a different person. |
| 94 | Richmond County | 4 | Duke of Richmond |
| 94 | Russell County | 4 | Each county is named after a different person. |
| 94 | San Juan County | 4 | San Juan River (Colorado River tributary) (3) |
| 94 | Sherman County | 4 | William Tecumseh Sherman, except Sherman County, Texas, named for Sidney Sherman |
| 94 | Smith County | 4 | Each county is named after a different person. |
| 94 | Somerset County | 4 | County of Somerset in England |
| 94 | St. Clair County | 4 | Arthur St. Clair, except St. Clair County, Michigan, named for St. Clare of Assisi |
| 94 | Sumter County | 4 | Thomas Sumter |
| 94 | Van Buren County | 4 | Martin Van Buren |
| 94 | Wheeler County | 4 | Each county is named after a different person. |
| 94 | Wilson County | 4 | Each county is named after a different person. |
| 94 | Wood County | 4 | Each county is named after a different person. |
| 123 | Baker County | 3 | Each county is named after a different person. |
| 123 | Beaver County | 3 | Beaver |
| 123 | Bedford County | 3 | Bedfordshire (a county in England) |
| 123 | Buchanan County | 3 | James Buchanan |
| 123 | Buffalo County | 3 | Buffalo; Buffalo River (Wisconsin) |
| 123 | Burke County | 3 | Each county is named after a different person. |
| 123 | Butte County | 3 | Butte (natural feature) |
| 123 | Cameron County | 3 | Simon Cameron (2) |
| 123 | Cedar County | 3 | Cedar |
| 123 | Chester County | 3 | Chester, England (2) |
| 123 | Cheyenne County | 3 | Cheyenne people |
| 123 | Chippewa County | 3 | Ojibwa people |
| 123 | Choctaw County | 3 | Choctaw people |
| 123 | Christian County | 3 | William Christian |
| 123 | Claiborne County | 3 | William C. C. Claiborne |
| 123 | Cleveland County | 3 | Grover Cleveland (2) |
| 123 | Coffee County | 3 | John Coffee |
| 123 | Comanche County | 3 | Comanche people |
| 123 | Cook County | 3 | Each county is named after a different person. |
| 123 | Daviess County | 3 | Joseph Hamilton Daveiss |
| 123 | Delta County | 3 | Triangular shape (Greek letter delta, Δ) (2) |
| 123 | DeSoto County | 3 | Hernando de Soto |
| 123 | Dickinson County | 3 | Daniel S. Dickinson (2) |
| 123 | Edwards County | 3 | Each county is named after a different person. |
| 123 | Ellis County | 3 | Each county is named after a different person. |
| 123 | Erie County | 3 | Lake Erie, Erie people |
| 123 | Fairfield County | 3 | The beauty of the fields in these areas |
| 123 | Gallatin County | 3 | Albert Gallatin |
| 123 | Graham County | 3 | Each county is named after a different person or feature. |
| 123 | Grayson County | 3 | William Grayson (2) |
| 123 | Hall County | 3 | Each county is named after a different person. |
| 123 | Haskell County | 3 | Each county is named after a different person. |
| 123 | Holmes County | 3 | Each county is named after a different person. |
| 123 | Humboldt County | 3 | Alexander von Humboldt |
| 123 | Kiowa County | 3 | Kiowa people |
| 123 | LaSalle County | 3 | René-Robert Cavelier, Sieur de La Salle |
| 123 | Lauderdale County | 3 | James Lauderdale |
| 123 | Lowndes County | 3 | William Jones Lowndes |
| 123 | McIntosh County | 3 | Each county is named after a different person. |
| 123 | McLean County | 3 | Each county is named after a different person. |
| 123 | McPherson County | 3 | James B. McPherson |
| 123 | Meade County | 3 | George Gordon Meade |
| 123 | Miami County | 3 | Miami people |
| 123 | Miller County | 3 | Each county is named after a different person. |
| 123 | Moore County | 3 | Each county is named after a different person. |
| 123 | Morris County | 3 | Each county is named after a different person. |
| 123 | Murray County | 3 | Each county is named after a different person. |
| 123 | Nelson County | 3 | Thomas Nelson Jr. |
| 123 | Noble County | 3 | Each county is named after a different person. |
| 123 | Northampton County | 3 | Northamptonshire, England (2) |
| 123 | Ohio County | 3 | Ohio River |
| 123 | Oneida County | 3 | Oneida people (2) |
| 123 | Orleans County | 3 | All named directly or indirectly for the royal House of Orléans, Louis Philippe II, Duke of Orléans and/or the Battle of New Orleans. |
| 123 | Osage County | 3 | Osage people |
| 123 | Osceola County | 3 | Osceola |
| 123 | Park County | 3 | South Park and Yellowstone |
| 123 | Pawnee County | 3 | Pawnee people |
| 123 | Pickens County | 3 | Andrew Pickens |
| 123 | Platte County | 3 | Each county is named after a different 'Platte River'. |
| 123 | Pope County | 3 | Each county is named after a different person. |
| 123 | Pottawatomie County | 3 | Potawatomi people |
| 123 | Potter County | 3 | Each county is named after a different person. |
| 123 | Robertson County | 3 | Each county is named after a different person. |
| 123 | Rock County | 3 | Each county is named after a different 'Rock River' or 'Rock Creek.' |
| 123 | Rockingham County | 3 | Charles Watson-Wentworth, 2nd Marquess of Rockingham |
| 123 | Schuyler County | 3 | Philip Schuyler |
| 123 | Seminole County | 3 | Seminole people |
| 123 | Sevier County | 3 | Each county is named after a different person or river. |
| 123 | Sioux County | 3 | Sioux people |
| 123 | Stark County | 3 | John Stark (2); Starke County, Indiana, is also named for him |
| 123 | Stephens County | 3 | Alexander H. Stephens (2) |
| 123 | Stevens County | 3 | Isaac Stevens (2) |
| 123 | Stone County | 3 | Each county is named after a different person or formation. |
| 123 | Summit County | 3 | Summits (geographical feature) |
| 123 | Sussex County | 3 | County of Sussex in England |
| 123 | Teton County | 3 | Teton River (Montana); Teton Range |
| 123 | Thomas County | 3 | George Henry Thomas (2) |
| 123 | Todd County | 3 | John Blair Smith Todd (2) |
| 123 | Valley County | 3 | Valleys (geographical feature) |
| 123 | Vermilion County | 3 | Vermilion River |
| 123 | Vernon County | 3 | Mount Vernon |
| 123 | Walker County | 3 | Samuel Walker (Texas) |
| 123 | Williamson County | 3 | Hugh Williamson (2) |
| 123 | Winnebago County | 3 | Winnebago people |
| 123 | Worth County | 3 | William J. Worth |
| 123 | Wright County | 3 | Silas Wright |
| 123 | Wyoming County | 3 | Delaware Indian word meaning "wide plains"; Wyoming Valley |
| 210 | Albany County | 2 | James, Duke of York and Albany (later King James II) |
| 210 | Alexander County | 2 | Each county is named after a different person. |
| 210 | Armstrong County | 2 | The counties are named for different people. |
| 210 | Ashland County | 2 | The Lexington estate of Henry Clay |
| 210 | Atchison County | 2 | David Rice Atchison |
| 210 | Baldwin County | 2 | Abraham Baldwin |
| 210 | Barry County | 2 | William T. Barry |
| 210 | Barton County | 2 | The counties are named for different people. |
| 210 | Bath County | 2 | Hot springs (natural feature) |
| 210 | Barbour County | 2 | The counties are named for different people. |
| 210 | Bay County | 2 | Bays (natural feature) |
| 210 | Beaufort County | 2 | Henry, Duke of Beaufort |
| 210 | Beckham County | 2 | J. C. W. Beckham |
| 210 | Bell County | 2 | The counties are named for different people. |
| 210 | Berkeley County | 2 | May have both been named for William Berkeley |
| 210 | Berrien County | 2 | John M. Berrien |
| 210 | Bibb County | 2 | William W. Bibb |
| 210 | Big Horn County | 2 | Big Horn River |
| 210 | Blount County | 2 | William Blount |
| 210 | Bourbon County | 2 | French royal House of Bourbon |
| 210 | Boyd County | 2 | The counties are named for different people. |
| 210 | Bradford County | 2 | The counties are named for different people. |
| 210 | Bradley County | 2 | The counties are named for different people. |
| 210 | Bristol County | 2 | Bristol, England |
| 210 | Brooks County | 2 | The counties are named for different people. |
| 210 | Brunswick County | 2 | Duchy of Brunswick-Lüneburg |
| 210 | Bryan County | 2 | |
| 210 | Burnett County | 2 | |
| 210 | Caddo County | 2 | Caddo people |
| 210 | Caroline County | 2 | |
| 210 | Chambers County | 2 | |
| 210 | Champaign County | 2 | |
| 210 | Charlotte County | 2 | |
| 210 | Chase County | 2 | |
| 210 | Chatham County | 2 | |
| 210 | Chautauqua County | 2 | |
| 210 | Chesterfield County | 2 | |
| 210 | Chickasaw County | 2 | Chickasaw people |
| 210 | Clayton County | 2 | |
| 210 | Clearwater County | 2 | |
| 210 | Cleburne County | 2 | Patrick Cleburne |
| 210 | Colfax County | 2 | Schuyler Colfax |
| 210 | Coos County | 2 | |
| 210 | Covington County | 2 | |
| 210 | Craig County | 2 | |
| 210 | Crittenden County | 2 | |
| 210 | Crockett County | 2 | David Crockett |
| 210 | Crook County | 2 | George Crook |
| 210 | Curry County | 2 | |
| 210 | Dade County | 2 | |
| 210 | Dakota County | 2 | Sioux people |
| 210 | Davidson County | 2 | |
| 210 | Davis County | 2 | |
| 210 | Deuel County | 2 | |
| 210 | Dewey County | 2 | |
| 210 | DeWitt County | 2 | DeWitt Clinton (Illinois); Green DeWitt (Texas) |
| 210 | Dorchester County | 2 | |
| 210 | Dunn County | 2 | |
| 210 | Duval County | 2 | |
| 210 | Eddy County | 2 | |
| 210 | Effingham County | 2 | |
| 210 | El Paso County | 2 | |
| 210 | Elbert County | 2 | |
| 210 | Elk County | 2 | Elk |
| 210 | Elmore County | 2 | |
| 210 | Emmet County | 2 | |
| 210 | Escambia County | 2 | Escambia River |
| 210 | Fannin County | 2 | James Fannin |
| 210 | Fillmore County | 2 | Millard Fillmore |
| 210 | Florence County | 2 | |
| 210 | Ford County | 2 | |
| 210 | Forest County | 2 | |
| 210 | Forsyth County | 2 | |
| 210 | Frederick County | 2 | |
| 210 | Genesee County | 2 | |
| 210 | Gibson County | 2 | |
| 210 | Giles County | 2 | |
| 210 | Gilmer County | 2 | |
| 210 | Gloucester County | 2 | County of Gloucestershire in England |
| 210 | Golden Valley County | 2 | |
| 210 | Grady County | 2 | |
| 210 | Grand County | 2 | Grand River |
| 210 | Gray County | 2 | |
| 210 | Greeley County | 2 | Horace Greeley |
| 210 | Greenwood County | 2 | |
| 210 | Guadalupe County | 2 | |
| 210 | Hale County | 2 | |
| 210 | Halifax County | 2 | |
| 210 | Hampshire County | 2 | County of Hampshire in England |
| 210 | Hardeman County | 2 | |
| 210 | Harding County | 2 | Warren Harding (New Mexico); J.A. Harding (South Dakota) |
| 210 | Harlan County | 2 | |
| 210 | Harper County | 2 | |
| 210 | Harris County | 2 | |
| 210 | Hart County | 2 | |
| 210 | Hayes County | 2 | Rutherford B. Hayes (Nebraska); John Coffee Hays (Texas) |
| 210 | Haywood County | 2 | |
| 210 | Hickman County | 2 | |
| 210 | Hidalgo County | 2 | Villa de Guadalupe (New Mexico); Miguel Hidalgo y Costilla (Texas) |
| 210 | Highland County | 2 | |
| 210 | Hill County | 2 | |
| 210 | Hillsborough County | 2 | |
| 210 | Holt County | 2 | |
| 210 | Hopkins County | 2 | |
| 210 | Hughes County | 2 | |
| 210 | Humphreys County | 2 | |
| 210 | Huron County | 2 | Lake Huron (Michigan); Huron people (Ohio) |
| 210 | Hutchinson County | 2 | |
| 210 | Hyde County | 2 | |
| 210 | Iowa County | 2 | |
| 210 | Jeff Davis County | 2 | Jefferson Davis |
| 210 | Johnston County | 2 | |
| 210 | Juneau County | 2 | |
| 210 | Kane County | 2 | |
| 210 | Kendall County | 2 | |
| 210 | King County | 2 | William Philip King (Texas); Martin Luther King Jr. (Washington) |
| 210 | Kings County | 2 | |
| 210 | Lane County | 2 | |
| 210 | Laurens County | 2 | Henry Laurens and John Laurens |
| 210 | Leon County | 2 | |
| 210 | Limestone County | 2 | |
| 210 | Louisa County | 2 | |
| 210 | Lucas County | 2 | |
| 210 | Marquette County | 2 | |
| 210 | McDowell County | 2 | |
| 210 | McHenry County | 2 | |
| 210 | Mecklenburg County | 2 | Charlotte of Mecklenburg-Strelitz |
| 210 | Medina County | 2 | Medina River (Texas); Medina, Saudi Arabia (Ohio) |
| 210 | Meigs County | 2 | Return J. Meigs Sr. |
| 210 | Menard County | 2 | |
| 210 | Menominee County | 2 | Menominee people |
| 210 | Midland County | 2 | |
| 210 | Mills County | 2 | |
| 210 | Mississippi County | 2 | Mississippi River |
| 210 | Morrow County | 2 | |
| 210 | Morton County | 2 | |
| 210 | Nassau County | 2 | |
| 210 | Nemaha County | 2 | |
| 210 | Nevada County | 2 | Nevada City (California); Nevada |
| 210 | Nicholas County | 2 | |
| 210 | Northumberland County | 2 | Northumberland, England |
| 210 | Oconee County | 2 | |
| 210 | Oldham County | 2 | |
| 210 | Otero County | 2 | |
| 210 | Otsego County | 2 | |
| 210 | Ouachita County | 2 | |
| 210 | Owen County | 2 | |
| 210 | Page County | 2 | |
| 210 | Panola County | 2 | |
| 210 | Paulding County | 2 | John Paulding |
| 210 | Pendleton County | 2 | Edmund Pendleton |
| 210 | Pennington County | 2 | |
| 210 | Perkins County | 2 | |
| 210 | Phelps County | 2 | |
| 210 | Plymouth County | 2 | Plymouth, Massachusetts |
| 210 | Pocahontas County | 2 | Pocahontas |
| 210 | Pontotoc County | 2 | Chickasaw word for the region |
| 210 | Portage County | 2 | Portages |
| 210 | Powell County | 2 | Lazarus Powell (Kentucky); John Wesley Powell (Montana) |
| 210 | Prairie County | 2 | Grand Prairie (Arkansas); Great Plains (Montana) |
| 210 | Quitman County | 2 | John A. Quitman |
| 210 | Ramsey County | 2 | Alexander Ramsey |
| 210 | Red River County | 2 | Red River |
| 210 | Renville County | 2 | Joseph Renville |
| 210 | Rice County | 2 | Samuel Rice (Kansas); Henry Rice (Minnesota) |
| 210 | Ripley County | 2 | Eleazer Wheelock Ripley |
| 210 | Roane County | 2 | |
| 210 | Roberts County | 2 | |
| 210 | Roosevelt County | 2 | Theodore Roosevelt |
| 210 | Rowan County | 2 | |
| 210 | Rush County | 2 | |
| 210 | Rusk County | 2 | |
| 210 | Rutherford County | 2 | Griffith Rutherford |
| 210 | Sabine County | 2 | Sabine River |
| 210 | San Miguel County | 2 | |
| 210 | Santa Cruz County | 2 | |
| 210 | Scotland County | 2 | Scotland |
| 210 | Sedgwick County | 2 | John Sedgwick |
| 210 | Seneca County | 2 | Seneca people |
| 210 | Seward County | 2 | William H. Seward |
| 210 | Shannon County | 2 | George Shannon; Peter Shannon |
| 210 | Sierra County | 2 | |
| 210 | Simpson County | 2 | |
| 210 | Spencer County | 2 | Spier Spencer |
| 210 | Stanley County | 2 | David Stanley |
| 210 | St. Charles County | 2 | Saint Charles Borromeo |
| 210 | St. Joseph County | 2 | St. Joseph River |
| 210 | St. Louis County | 2 | |
| 210 | Stafford County | 2 | |
| 210 | Stanton County | 2 | Edwin Stanton |
| 210 | Steele County | 2 | |
| 210 | Steuben County | 2 | Baron von Steuben |
| 210 | Stewart County | 2 | |
| 210 | Suffolk County | 2 | County of Suffolk in England |
| 210 | Sumner County | 2 | Edwin V. Sumner (Kansas); Jethro Sumner (Tennessee) |
| 210 | Surry County | 2 | County of Surrey in England |
| 210 | Talbot County | 2 | |
| 210 | Tazewell County | 2 | |
| 210 | Terrell County | 2 | |
| 210 | Texas County | 2 | The state of Texas |
| 210 | Thurston County | 2 | |
| 210 | Tioga County | 2 | |
| 210 | Tipton County | 2 | |
| 210 | Trinity County | 2 | Trinity River |
| 210 | Turner County | 2 | |
| 210 | Tyler County | 2 | John Tyler |
| 210 | Upshur County | 2 | Abel Parker Upshur |
| 210 | Wabash County | 2 | Wabash River |
| 210 | Walton County | 2 | |
| 210 | Walworth County | 2 | |
| 210 | Ward County | 2 | |
| 210 | Wells County | 2 | |
| 210 | Westmoreland County | 2 | County of Westmorland in England |
| 210 | Whitley County | 2 | William Whitley |
| 210 | Wichita County | 2 | Wichita people, indirectly |
| 210 | Wilcox County | 2 | |
| 210 | Wilkes County | 2 | John Wilkes |
| 210 | Wilkinson County | 2 | James Wilkinson |
| 210 | Williams County | 2 | |
| 210 | Windham County | 2 | Wineham [sic], England |
| 210 | Winston County | 2 | |
| 210 | Wise County | 2 | Henry Alexander Wise |
| 210 | Woodford County | 2 | William Woodford |
| 210 | Worcester County | 2 | |
| 210 | Yuma County | 2 | Yuma (Quechan) people |
