= County (United States) =

Subdivision of a U.S. state or territory

- Also known as: County equivalent (see list below)
- Category: Second-level administrative division
- Location: States, federal district and territories of the United States of America
- Found in: State
- Number: 3,244 (including county equivalents in the 50 states and the District of Columbia, and the 100 county equivalents in the U.S. territories)
- Populations: Greatest: Los Angeles County, California—10,014,009 (2020); Least: Loving County, Texas—64; 8 entities (Note: The 8 county equivalents with zero people are Rose Atoll (American Samoa), Northern Islands Municipality (Northern Mariana Islands), Baker Island, Howland Island, Jarvis Island, Johnston Atoll, Kingman Reef and Navassa Island) (county equivalents)—0 (2020); Average: 104,435 (2019); Median: Nicholas County, West Virginia—25,965 (2019)
- Areas: Largest: San Bernardino County, California—20,057 sq mi (51,950 km^{2}); Yukon–Koyukuk Census Area, Alaska (county equivalent)—145,505 sq mi (376,860 km^{2}); Smallest: Kalawao County, Hawaii—12 sq mi (31 km^{2}); Falls Church, Virginia (county equivalent)—2 sq mi (5.2 km^{2}); Smallest (including territories): Kingman Reef (county equivalent)—0.01 sq mi (0.026 km^{2}); Average: 1,208 sq mi (3,130 km^{2})
- Government: Groups: county commission, board of commissioners, board of supervisors (AZ, CA, IA, MS, VA, WI) county council (WA), commissioners' court (TX), board of county commissioners (NJ), fiscal court (KY), police jury (LA), councils of governments (CT); Individuals: county executive, county manager, sole commissioner (GA), county mayor, county administrator, county judge
- Subdivisions: Minor civil division, township, city, hundred, and unincorporated place

In the United States, a county or county equivalent is an administrative subdivision of a state or territory, typically with defined geographic boundaries and some level of governmental authority. The term "county" is used in 47 states, while Louisiana, Alaska, and Connecticut have functionally "county equivalent" subdivisions called parishes, boroughs, and councils of governments or planning regions, respectively. County equivalents also include independent cities, in which a municipality has been legally separated from counties altogether. The District of Columbia is considered a single county equivalent for administrative purposes. In addition, the United States Census Bureau further divides Alaska's Unorganized Borough into 11 census areas that are statistically equivalent to counties.

Counties and other local governments exist as a matter of U.S. state law, so the specific governmental powers of counties may vary widely between the states, with many providing some level of services to municipalities, civil townships, and unincorporated areas. Certain municipalities are in multiple counties. Some states may have consolidated city-counties, in which a municipality has been consolidated with its county government into a type of unitary authority. Four states have independent cities, which may have governmental powers similar to consolidated city-counties but are legally not in the territory of any county. Counties in Hawaii handle almost all services since there is no formal level of government (municipality, public education, or otherwise) in that state that exists below that of the county. Conversely, counties in Rhode Island, Connecticut's historical counties, eight of Massachusetts's 14 counties, and Alaska's Unorganized Borough and its 11 census areas have no government power, existing only as geographic distinctions.

Territories of the United States do not have counties; instead, the United States Census Bureau also divides them into county equivalents. The U.S. Census Bureau counts American Samoa's districts and atolls as county equivalents. American Samoa locally has places called "counties", but these entities are considered to be "minor civil divisions" (not true counties) by the U.S. Census Bureau.

The number of counties per state ranges from the three counties of Delaware to the 254 counties of Texas. County populations also vary widely; in 2017, according to the Census Bureau, more than half the U.S. population was concentrated in just 143 of the more than 3,000 counties, or just 4.6% of all counties. As of 2017, the five most populous counties, ordered from most to least, were Los Angeles County, California; Cook County, Illinois; Harris County, Texas; Maricopa County, Arizona; and San Diego County, California.

As of 2022, there are 3,144 counties and county equivalents in the 50 states and the District of Columbia. If the 100 county equivalents in the U.S. territories are counted, then the total is 3,244 counties and county equivalents in the United States. (Note: At the time of the 2010 census, 3,143 counties and equivalents were recorded in the 50 states and the District of Columbia, with another 100 county equivalents recorded in the territories (when the nine Minor Outlying Islands are included). Since that time, the independent city of Bedford, Virginia, was dissolved and had its territory added to Bedford County, Virginia. Also, Alaska's Petersburg census area was incorporated as Petersburg Borough and the Valdez–Cordova Census Area was split into the Copper River and Chugach census areas. On June 6, 2022, the U.S. Census Bureau formally recognized Connecticut's nine councils of government as county equivalents instead of the state's eight counties. Connecticut's eight historical counties continue to exist in name only, and are no longer considered for statistical purposes. The net result of these changes has been the number of counties and equivalents increasing to 3,144.)

== History ==
The idea of counties originated with the counties of England. English (after 1707, British) colonists brought to their colonies in North America a political subdivision that they already used in the British metropole: the counties. Counties were among the earliest units of local government established in the Thirteen Colonies that would become the United States. Virginia created the first counties in order to ease the administrative workload in Jamestown. The House of Burgesses divided the colony first into four "incorporations" in 1617 and finally into eight shires (or counties) in 1634: James City, Henrico, Charles City, Charles River, Warrosquyoake, Accomac, Elizabeth City, and Warwick River. America's oldest intact county court records can be found at Eastville, Virginia, in Northampton (originally Accomac) County, dating to 1632. Maryland established its first county, St. Mary's in 1637. In 1639, the Province of Maine founded York County. Massachusetts followed in 1643. Pennsylvania and New York delegated significant power and responsibility from the colony government to county governments and thereby established a pattern for most of the United States, although counties remained relatively weak in New England.

When independence came, the framers of the Constitution left the matter to the states. Subsequently, state constitutions conceptualized county governments as arms of the state. Louisiana instead adopted the local divisions called parishes that dated back to both the Spanish colonial and French colonial periods when the land was dominated by the Catholic Church. In the twentieth century, the role of local governments strengthened and counties began providing more services, acquiring home rule and county commissions to pass local ordinances pertaining to their unincorporated areas. In 1955, delegates to the Alaska Constitutional Convention wanted to avoid the traditional county system and adopted their own unique model with different types of boroughs varying in powers and duties.

In some states, these powers are partly or mostly devolved to the counties' smaller divisions usually called townships, though in New York, New England and Wisconsin they are called "towns". The county may or may not be able to override its townships on certain matters, depending on state law.

The newest county in the United States is the consolidated city-county of Broomfield, Colorado, established in 2001 from parts of four existing counties. The newest county equivalents are the Alaskan census areas of Chugach and Copper River, both formed in 2019 from the now-defunct Valdez–Cordova Census Area, and the Alaskan boroughs of Petersburg established in 2013, Wrangell established in 2008, and Skagway established in 2007.

== County variations ==
=== Consolidated city-counties ===
A consolidated city-county is simultaneously a city, which is a municipality (municipal corporation), and a county, which is an administrative division of a state, having the powers and responsibilities of both types of entities. The city limit or jurisdiction is coterminous with the county line, as the two administrative entities become a non-dichotomous single entity. For this reason, a consolidated city-county is officially remarked as name of city – name of county (e.g., Augusta–Richmond County in Georgia). The same is true of the boroughs of New York City, each of which is coextensive with a county of New York State. For those entities in which the city uses the same name as the county, city and county of name may be used (e.g., City and County of Denver in Colorado).

Similarly, some of Alaska's boroughs have merged with their principal cities, creating unified city-boroughs. Some such consolidations and mergers have created cities that rank among the geographically largest cities in the world, though often with population densities far below those of most urban areas.

There are 40 consolidated city-counties in the U.S., including Augusta–Richmond County; the City and County of Denver, Colorado; the City and County of Honolulu, Hawaii; Indianapolis–Marion County, Indiana; Jacksonville–Duval County, Florida; Louisville–Jefferson County, Kentucky; Lexington–Fayette County, Kentucky; Kansas City–Wyandotte County, Kansas; Nashville–Davidson County, Tennessee; New Orleans–Orleans Parish, Louisiana; the City and County of Philadelphia, Pennsylvania; City and County of San Francisco, California; and Lynchburg-Moore County, Tennessee

A consolidated city-county may still contain independent municipalities maintaining some governmental powers that did not merge with the rest of the county. For example, the government of Jacksonville–Duval County, Florida, still provides county-level services to the four independent municipalities within its borders: Atlantic Beach, Baldwin, Jacksonville Beach, and Neptune Beach.

=== County equivalents ===
The term county equivalents is used by the United States Census Bureau to describe divisions that are comparable to counties but called by different names:

- Alaska boroughs: The state adopted the term "borough" instead of "county" to reflect Alaska's system with different classes of boroughs varying in governmental powers.
- Alaska census areas: Nearly half of the land area of Alaska is not contained within any of Alaska's 19 organized boroughs. This vast area, larger than France and Germany combined, is officially referred to by the Alaska state government as the Unorganized Borough and outside of other incorporated borough limits, has no independent "county" government, although several incorporated city governments exist within its boundaries; the majority of it is governed and run by the State of Alaska as an extension of state government. (Note: The Unorganized Borough formed by the Borough Act of 1961 is a legal entity, run by the Alaska state government as an extension of State government. It and the independently incorporated Unified, Home Rule, First Class and Second Class boroughs roughly correspond to parishes in Louisiana and to counties in the other 48 states.) The United States Census Bureau, in cooperation with the Alaska state government for census and electoral districting purposes, has divided the Unorganized Borough into 11 census areas for statistical purposes only. (Note: These 11 statistical areas are used solely by the United States Census Bureau to tabulate population and other census statistics within the Unorganized Borough; they have no legal basis in Alaska state or federal law other than for electoral representation and federal financial assistance purposes.)
- Louisiana parishes: The usage of the term "parish" for a territorial entity or local government in Louisiana dates back to both the Spanish colonial and French colonial periods when the land was dominated by the Catholic Church. New Orleans is a consolidated city-parish.
- Independent cities: These are cities that legally belong to no county. They differ from consolidated city-counties in that in the case of a consolidated city-county, the county at least nominally exists, whereas in the case of an independent city, no county even nominally exists. There are 41 such cities in the United States: Baltimore, Maryland; Carson City, Nevada; St. Louis, Missouri; and all 38 cities in Virginia, where any area incorporated as a city is outside of the county jurisdiction.
- Washington, D.C., outside the jurisdiction of any state, has a special status. The City of Washington comprises the entirety of the District of Columbia, which, in accordance with Article 1, Section 8 of the U.S. Constitution, is under the jurisdiction of the U.S. Congress. When founded in 1801, the district consisted of two counties and three cities. In 1846, Alexandria County (which now forms Arlington County and a portion of the independent city of Alexandria)—including the then City of Alexandria—was given back to Virginia. In 1871, the three remaining entities—the City of Washington, City of Georgetown, and Washington County (which was coterminous with the district)—were merged into a consolidated government of District of Columbia by an act of Congress. Georgetown was abolished as a city by another act in 1895.
- Connecticut councils of governments/planning regions: County governments were abolished in Connecticut in 1960. Regional councils of governments (COGs) have since been developed as a means of cooperation and coordination between municipalities, with each COG serving a "planning region". Application for the COGs to be considered county equivalents for statistical purposes was made to the Census Bureau in 2019, approved in 2022, and was fully implemented by 2024.

Consolidated city-counties are not designated county equivalents for administrative purposes; since both the city and the county at least nominally exist, they are properly classified as counties in their own right. Likewise, the boroughs of New York City are coextensive with counties and are therefore by definition also not county equivalents.

==== Territories ====
Most U.S. territories are directly divided into municipalities or similar units, which are mostly treated as county equivalents for statistical purposes:

- The 78 municipalities of Puerto Rico
- The two districts of the United States Virgin Islands, or the three main islands of the United States Virgin Islands
- The four municipalities of the Northern Mariana Islands
- The nine islands of the U.S. Minor Outlying Islands
- The three districts and two atolls of American Samoa

American Samoa has 15 of its own counties, but the U.S. Census Bureau treats these as minor civil divisions and the three districts and two atolls as county equivalents. The U.S. Census Bureau counts all of Guam as one county equivalent (with the FIPS code 66010), while the USGS counts Guam's election districts (villages) as county equivalents. The U.S. Census Bureau counts the three main islands in the U.S. Virgin Islands as county equivalents, while the USGS counts the districts of the U.S. Virgin Islands (of which there are 2) as county equivalents.

== Names and etymologies ==
Common sources of county names are names of people, geographic features, places in other states or countries, and animals.

Counties are most often named for people, often political figures or early settlers, with over 2,100 of the 3,144 total so named. The most common county name, with 31, is Washington County, for America's first president, George Washington. Up until 1871, there was a Washington County within the District of Columbia, but it was dissolved by the District of Columbia Organic Act. Jefferson County, for Thomas Jefferson, is next with 26. The most recent president to have a county named for him was Warren G. Harding, reflecting the slowing rate of county creation since New Mexico and Arizona became states in 1912. The most common counties named after non-presidents are Franklin (25), Clay (18), and Montgomery (18).

After people, the next most common source of county names is geographic features and locations. Some counties are named after counties in other states or for places in other countries. Particularly in the region of the original Thirteen Colonies, many counties are named after locales in the United Kingdom. Many counties are named for places in the original countries of their historical immigrants. The most common geographic county name is Lake.

Words from Native American languages, as well as the names of Native American leaders and tribes, lend their names to many counties. Many counties bear names of French or Spanish origin, such as Marquette County being named after French missionary Father Jacques Marquette.

The term for Louisiana's county equivalents, parishes (Fr. paroisse civile and Sp. parroquia), originates from the state's French and Spanish colonial periods. Before the Louisiana Purchase and granting of statehood, government was often administered in towns where major church parishes were located. Of the original 19 civil parishes of Louisiana that date from statehood in 1807, nine were named after the Roman Catholic parishes from which they were governed.

== County government ==
=== Organization ===
The structure and powers of a county government may be defined by the general law of the state or by a charter specific to that county. States may allow only general-law counties, only charter counties, or both. Generally, general-law local governments have less autonomy than chartered local governments.

Counties are usually governed by an elected body, variously called the county commission, board of supervisors, commissioners' court, county council, county court, police jury, or county legislature. In cases in which a consolidated city-county or independent city exists, a city council usually governs city/county or city affairs. In some counties, day-to-day operations are overseen by an elected county executive or by a chief administrative officer or county administrator who reports to the board, the mayor, or both.

In many states, the board in charge of a county holds powers that transcend all three traditional branches of government. It has the legislative power to enact laws for the county; it has the executive power to oversee the executive operations of county government; and it has quasi-judicial power with regard to certain limited matters (such as hearing appeals from the planning commission if one exists).

In many states, several important officials are elected separately from the board of commissioners or supervisors and cannot be fired by the board. These positions may include county clerk, county treasurer, county surrogate, sheriff, and others.

District attorneys or state attorneys are usually state-level as opposed to county-level officials, but in many states, counties and state judicial districts have coterminous boundaries.

The site of a county's administration, and often the county courthouse, is generally called the county seat ("parish seat" in Louisiana, "borough seat" in Alaska, or "shire town" in several New England counties). The county seat usually resides in a municipality. However, some counties may have multiple seats or no seat. In some counties with no incorporated municipalities, a large settlement may serve as the county seat.

=== Scope of power ===
The power of county governments varies widely from state to state, as does the relationship between counties and incorporated cities.

The powers of counties arise from state law and vary widely. In Connecticut and Rhode Island, counties are geographic entities, but not governmental jurisdictions. At the other extreme, Maryland counties and the county equivalent City of Baltimore handle almost all services, including public education, although the state retains an active oversight authority with many of these services. Counties in Hawaii also handle almost all services since there is no formal level of government (municipality, public education, or otherwise) existing below that of the county in the state.

In most Midwestern and Northeastern states, counties are further subdivided into townships or towns, which sometimes exercise local powers or administration. Throughout the United States, counties may contain other independent, self-governing municipalities.

==== Minimal scope ====
In New England, counties function at most as judicial court districts and sheriff's departments (presently, in Connecticut only as judicial court districts—and in Rhode Island, they have lost both those functions and most others but they are still used by the United States Census Bureau and some other federal agencies for some federal functions), and most of the governmental authority below the state level is in the hands of towns and cities. In several of Maine's sparsely populated counties, small towns rely on the county for law enforcement, and in New Hampshire several social programs are administered at the state level. In Connecticut, Rhode Island, and parts of Massachusetts, counties are now only geographic designations, and they do not have any governmental powers. All government is either done at the state level or at the municipal level. In Connecticut and parts of Massachusetts, regional councils have been established to partially fill the void left behind by the abolished county governments. (Note: Unlike in Massachusetts, Connecticut's regional councils do not conform to the old county lines, but rather, they are composed of towns that share the same geographic area and have similar demographics.) The regional councils' authority is limited compared with a county government—they have authority only over infrastructure and land use planning, distribution of state and federal funds for infrastructure projects, emergency preparedness, and limited law enforcement duties.

==== Moderate scope ====
In the Mid-Atlantic and Midwest, counties typically provide, at a minimum, courts, public utilities, libraries, hospitals, public health services, parks, roads, law enforcement, and jails. There is usually a county registrar, recorder, or clerk (the exact title varies) who collects vital statistics, holds elections (sometimes in coordination with a separate elections office or commission), and prepares or processes certificates of births, deaths, marriages, and dissolutions (divorce decrees). The county recorder normally maintains the official record of all real estate transactions. Other key county officials include the coroner/medical examiner, treasurer, assessor, auditor, comptroller, and district attorney.

In most states, the county sheriff is the chief law enforcement officer in the county. However, except in major emergencies where clear chains of command are essential, the county sheriff normally does not directly control the police departments of city governments, but merely cooperates with them (e.g., under mutual aid pacts). Thus, the most common interaction between county and city law enforcement personnel is when city police officers deliver suspects to sheriff's deputies for detention or incarceration in the county jail.

In most states, the state courts and local law enforcement are organized and implemented along county boundaries. However, nearly all of the substantive and procedural law adjudicated in state trial courts originates from the state legislature and state appellate courts. In other words, most criminal defendants are prosecuted for violations of state law, not local ordinances, and if they, the district attorney, or police seek reforms to the criminal justice system, they will usually have to direct their efforts towards the state legislature rather than the county (which merely implements state law).

A typical criminal defendant will be arraigned and subsequently indicted or held over for trial before a trial court in and for a particular county where the crime occurred, kept in the county jail (if he is not granted bail or cannot make bail), prosecuted by the county's district attorney, and tried before a jury selected from that county. But long-term incarceration is rarely a county responsibility, execution of capital punishment is never a county responsibility, and the state's responses to prisoners' appeals are the responsibility of the state attorney general, who has to defend before the state appellate courts the prosecutions conducted by locally elected district attorneys in the name of the state. Furthermore, county-level trial court judges are officers of the judicial branch of the state government rather than county governments.

In many states, the county controls all unincorporated lands within its boundaries. In states with a township tier, unincorporated land is controlled by the townships. Residents of unincorporated land who are dissatisfied with county-level or township-level resource allocation decisions can attempt to vote to incorporate as a city, town, or village.

A few counties directly provide public transportation themselves, usually in the form of a simple bus system. However, in most counties, public transportation is provided by one of the following: a special district that is coterminous with the county (but exists separately from the county government), a multi-county regional transit authority, or a state agency.

==== Broad scope ====
In western and southern states, more populated counties provide many facilities, such as airports, convention centers, museums, recreation centers, beaches, harbors, zoos, clinics, law libraries, and public housing. They provide services such as child and family services, elder services, mental health services, welfare services, veterans assistance services, animal control, probation supervision, historic preservation, food safety regulation, and environmental health services. They have many additional officials like public defenders, arts commissioners, human rights commissioners, and planning commissioners.

There may be a county fire department and a county police department – as distinguished from fire and police departments operated by individual cities, special districts, or the state government. For example, Gwinnett County, Georgia, and its county seat, the city of Lawrenceville, each have their own police departments. (A separate county sheriff's department is responsible for security of the county courts and administration of the county jail.) In several southern states, public school systems are organized and administered at the county level.

== Statistics ==
As of 2024, there were 2,999 counties, 64 Louisiana parishes, 19 organized boroughs and 11 census areas in Alaska, 9 councils of government in Connecticut, 41 independent cities, (Note: Prior to July 1, 2016, there were 42 independent cities. At that time, Bedford, Virginia, gave up its city status and became a town within Bedford County.) and the District of Columbia for a total of 3,144 counties and county equivalents in the 50 states and District of Columbia. There are an additional 100 county equivalents in the territories of the United States. The average number of counties per state is 62, with a range from the three counties of Delaware to the 254 counties of Texas.

Southern and Midwestern states generally tend to have more counties than Western or Northeastern states, as many Northeastern states are not large enough in area to warrant a large number of counties, and many Western states were sparsely populated when counties were created by their respective state legislatures. The five counties of Rhode Island and eight of the 14 counties of Massachusetts no longer have functional county governments, but continue to exist as legal and census entities. Connecticut abolished county governments in 1960, leaving its eight counties as mere legal and census entities. In 2022, the U.S. Census Bureau recognized the state's nine councils of governments as replacement for the state's eight legacy counties for all statistical purposes; full implementation was completed in 2024.

The counties and county equivalents of the United States of America, by state or territory
State, federal district or territory	Total		Subdivisions			Average	
State, federal district or territory	2024 population (Note: Estimates have not been made available for the territories of American Samoa; Guam; the Northern Mariana Islands; the U.S. Minor Outlying Islands; and the U.S. Virgin Islands. Currently, outdated 2019 estimates have been kept in place for the named.)	Land area	Counties	Equivalents	Total	Population	Land area
Alabama	5,157,699	50,645 sq mi 131,171 km^{2}	67	—	67	76,981	756 sq mi 1,958 km^{2}
Alaska	740,133	570,641 sq mi 1,477,953 km^{2}	—	30 (Note: Alaska has 19 organized boroughs and one Unorganized Borough divided into 11 census areas.)	30	24,671	19,677 sq mi 50,964 km^{2}
Arizona	7,582,384	113,594 sq mi 294,207 km^{2}	15	—	15	505,492	7,573 sq mi 19,614 km^{2}
Arkansas	3,088,354	52,035 sq mi 134,771 km^{2}	75	—	75	41,178	694 sq mi 1,797 km^{2}
California	39,431,263	155,779 sq mi 403,466 km^{2}	58	—	58	679,849	2,686 sq mi 6,956 km^{2}
Colorado	5,957,493	103,642 sq mi 268,431 km^{2}	64	—	64	93,086	1,619 sq mi 4,194 km^{2}
Connecticut	3,675,069	4,842 sq mi 12,542 km^{2}	—	9 (Note: On June 6, 2022, the U.S. Census Bureau formally recognized Connecticut's nine councils of governments as county equivalents instead of the state's eight counties. Connecticut's county governments were disbanded in 1960, and the councils of governments took over some of the local governmental functions. Connecticut's eight historical counties continue to exist in name only, and are no longer considered for statistical purposes.)	9	408,341	605 sq mi 1,568 km^{2}
Delaware	1,051,917	1,949 sq mi 5,047 km^{2}	3	—	3	350,639	650 sq mi 1,682 km^{2}
(Washington, D.C.) District of Columbia	702,250	61 sq mi 158 km^{2}	—	1 (Note: The U.S. Census Bureau and the Office of Management and Budget consider the entire District of Columbia to be a county equivalent.)	1	702,250	61 sq mi 158 km^{2}
Florida	23,372,215	53,625 sq mi 138,887 km^{2}	67	—	67	348,839	800 sq mi 2,073 km^{2}
(Georgia (U.S. state)) Georgia	11,180,878	57,513 sq mi 148,959 km^{2}	159	—	159	70,320	362 sq mi 937 km^{2}
Hawaii	1,446,146	6,423 sq mi 16,635 km^{2}	5	—	5	289,229	1,285 sq mi 3,327 km^{2}
Idaho	2,001,619	82,643 sq mi 214,045 km^{2}	44	—	44	45,491	1,878 sq mi 4,865 km^{2}
Illinois	12,710,158	55,519 sq mi 143,793 km^{2}	102	—	102	124,609	544 sq mi 1,410 km^{2}
Indiana	6,924,275	35,826 sq mi 92,789 km^{2}	92	—	92	75,264	389 sq mi 1,009 km^{2}
Iowa	3,241,488	55,857 sq mi 144,669 km^{2}	99	—	99	32,742	564 sq mi 1,461 km^{2}
Kansas	2,970,606	81,759 sq mi 211,754 km^{2}	105	—	105	28,291	779 sq mi 2,017 km^{2}
Kentucky	4,588,372	39,486 sq mi 102,269 km^{2}	120	—	120	38,236	329 sq mi 852 km^{2}
Louisiana	4,597,740	43,204 sq mi 111,898 km^{2}	—	64 (Note: Louisiana has 64 parishes instead of counties.)	64	71,840	675 sq mi 1,748 km^{2}
Maine	1,405,012	30,843 sq mi 79,883 km^{2}	16	—	16	87,813	1,928 sq mi 4,993 km^{2}
Maryland	6,263,220	9,707 sq mi 25,142 km^{2}	23	1 (Note: Baltimore, Maryland is an independent city.)	24	260,968	404 sq mi 1,048 km^{2}
Massachusetts	7,136,171	7,800 sq mi 20,202 km^{2}	14	—	14	509,727	557 sq mi 1,443 km^{2}
Michigan	10,140,459	56,539 sq mi 146,435 km^{2}	83	—	83	122,174	681 sq mi 1,764 km^{2}
Minnesota	5,793,151	79,627 sq mi 206,232 km^{2}	87	—	87	66,588	915 sq mi 2,370 km^{2}
Mississippi	2,943,045	46,923 sq mi 121,531 km^{2}	82	—	82	35,891	572 sq mi 1,482 km^{2}
Missouri	6,245,466	68,742 sq mi 178,040 km^{2}	114	1 (Note: St. Louis, Missouri is an independent city.)	115	54,308	598 sq mi 1,548 km^{2}
Montana	1,137,233	145,546 sq mi 376,962 km^{2}	56	—	56	20,308	2,599 sq mi 6,731 km^{2}
Nebraska	2,005,465	76,824 sq mi 198,974 km^{2}	93	—	93	21,564	826 sq mi 2,140 km^{2}
Nevada	3,267,467	109,781 sq mi 284,332 km^{2}	16	1 (Note: Carson City, Nevada is an independent city.)	17	192,204	6,458 sq mi 16,725 km^{2}
New Hampshire	1,409,032	8,953 sq mi 23,187 km^{2}	10	—	10	140,903	895 sq mi 2,319 km^{2}
New Jersey	9,500,851	7,354 sq mi 19,047 km^{2}	21	—	21	452,421	350 sq mi 907 km^{2}
New Mexico	2,130,256	121,298 sq mi 314,161 km^{2}	33	—	33	64,553	3,676 sq mi 9,520 km^{2}
(New York (state)) New York	19,867,248	47,126 sq mi 122,057 km^{2}	62	—	62	320,439	760 sq mi 1,969 km^{2}
North Carolina	11,046,024	48,618 sq mi 125,920 km^{2}	100	—	100	110,460	486 sq mi 1,259 km^{2}
North Dakota	796,568	69,001 sq mi 178,711 km^{2}	53	—	53	15,030	1,302 sq mi 3,372 km^{2}
Ohio	11,883,304	40,861 sq mi 105,829 km^{2}	88	—	88	135,038	464 sq mi 1,203 km^{2}
Oklahoma	4,095,393	68,595 sq mi 177,660 km^{2}	77	—	77	53,187	891 sq mi 2,307 km^{2}
Oregon	4,272,371	95,988 sq mi 248,608 km^{2}	36	—	36	118,677	2,666 sq mi 6,906 km^{2}
Pennsylvania	13,078,751	44,743 sq mi 115,883 km^{2}	67	—	67	195,205	668 sq mi 1,730 km^{2}
Rhode Island	1,112,308	1,034 sq mi 2,678 km^{2}	5	—	5	222,462	207 sq mi 536 km^{2}
South Carolina	5,478,831	30,061 sq mi 77,857 km^{2}	46	—	46	119,105	653 sq mi 1,693 km^{2}
South Dakota	924,669	75,811 sq mi 196,350 km^{2}	66	—	66	14,010	1,149 sq mi 2,975 km^{2}
Tennessee	7,227,750	41,235 sq mi 106,798 km^{2}	95	—	95	76,082	434 sq mi 1,124 km^{2}
Texas	31,290,831	261,232 sq mi 676,587 km^{2}	254	—	254	123,192	1,028 sq mi 2,664 km^{2}
Utah	3,503,613	82,170 sq mi 212,818 km^{2}	29	—	29	120,814	2,833 sq mi 7,339 km^{2}
Vermont	648,493	9,217 sq mi 23,871 km^{2}	14	—	14	46,321	658 sq mi 1,705 km^{2}
Virginia	8,811,195	39,490 sq mi 102,279 km^{2}	95	38 (Note: Virginia has 38 independent cities.)	133	66,250	416 sq mi 1,077 km^{2}
(Washington (state)) Washington	7,958,180	66,456 sq mi 172,119 km^{2}	39	—	39	204,056	1,704 sq mi 4,413 km^{2}
West Virginia	1,769,979	24,038 sq mi 62,259 km^{2}	55	—	55	32,181	437 sq mi 1,132 km^{2}
Wisconsin	5,960,975	54,158 sq mi 140,268 km^{2}	72	—	72	82,791	752 sq mi 1,948 km^{2}
Wyoming	587,618	97,093 sq mi 251,470 km^{2}	23	—	23	25,549	4,221 sq mi 10,933 km^{2}
United States (50 states and the District of Columbia)	340,110,988	3,531,905 sq mi 9,147,592 km^{2}	2,999	145	3,144	108,178	1,124 sq mi 2,910 km^{2}
American Samoa (Note: Although American Samoa has 15 counties, they are not counted by the U.S. Census Bureau. The Bureau instead counts American Samoa's 3 districts and 2 atolls as county equivalents.)	51,504	77 sq mi 199 km^{2}	—	5	5	11,104	15 sq mi 40 km^{2}
Guam (Note: Guam does not have counties. All of Guam is counted as one county equivalent by the U.S. Census Bureau.)	162,742	210 sq mi 540 km^{2}	—	1	1	162,742	210 sq mi 540 km^{2}
Northern Mariana Islands (Note: The Northern Mariana Islands do not have counties. The U.S. Census Bureau counts the 4 municipalities of the Northern Mariana Islands as county equivalents.)	52,263	179 sq mi 464 km^{2}	—	4	4	13,066	45 sq mi 116 km^{2}
Puerto Rico (Note: Puerto Rico does not have counties. The U.S. Census Bureau counts Puerto Rico's 78 municipalities as county equivalents.)	3,203,295	3,515 sq mi 9,104 km^{2}	—	78	78	41,068	45 sq mi 116 km^{2}
(United States) U.S. Minor Outlying Islands (Note: The U.S. Minor Outlying Islands do not have counties. The U.S. Census Bureau counts each of the 9 island groups in the U.S. Minor Outlying Islands as county equivalents.) (Note: The Minor Outlying Islands have no permanent residents. All reported population consists of temporary military and scientific habitation.)	160	13 sq mi 34 km^{2}	—	9	9	18	1 sq mi 4 km^{2}
(United States Virgin Islands) U.S. Virgin Islands (Note: The U.S. Virgin Islands do not have counties. The U.S. Census Bureau counts the three main islands (Saint Croix, Saint Thomas and Saint John) as county equivalents.)	104,901	134 sq mi 346 km^{2}	—	3	3	34,967	45 sq mi 115 km^{2}
United States (50 states, the District of Columbia, and territories)	330,744,054	3,535,948 sq mi 9,158,064 km^{2}	2,999	245	3,244	101,987	1,091 sq mi 2,825 km^{2}

=== Population ===
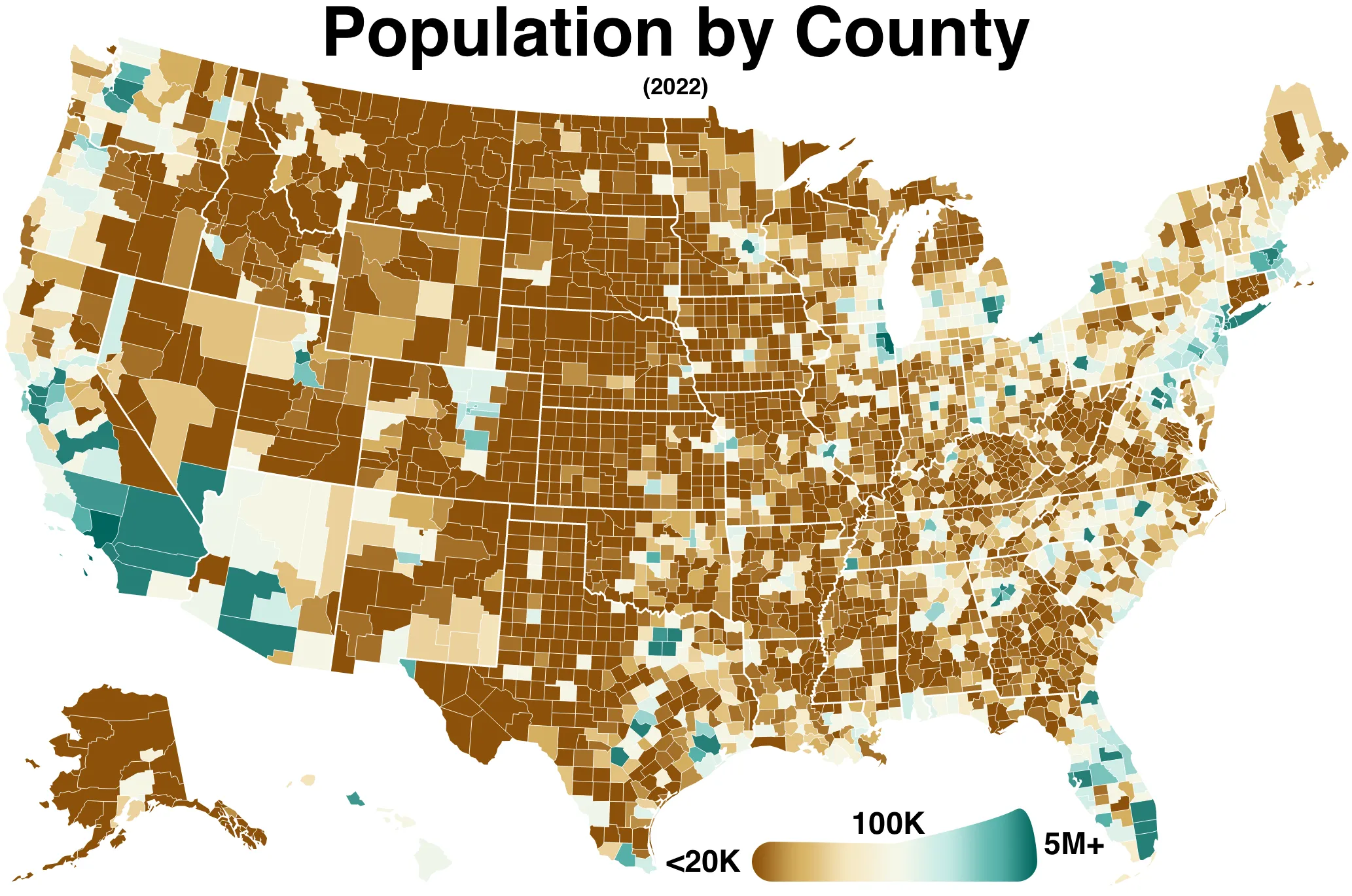
County population map 2022 census estimates excl. CT

The average U.S. county population was 104,435 in 2019, while the median county, Nicholas County, West Virginia, had a population of 25,965 in 2019. The most populous county is Los Angeles County, California, with 10,014,009 residents in 2020. This number is greater than the populations of 41 U.S. states, and is only slightly smaller than the combined population of the 10 least populous states and Washington, D.C. It also makes the population of Los Angeles County 17.4 times greater than that of the least populous state, Wyoming.

The second most populous county is Cook County, Illinois, with a population of 5,275,541. Cook County's population is larger than that of 28 individual U.S. states and the combined populations of the six smallest states.

The least populous county is Loving County, Texas, with 64 residents in 2020. Eight county equivalents in the U.S. territories have no human population: Rose Atoll, Northern Islands Municipality, Baker Island, Howland Island, Jarvis Island, Johnston Atoll, Kingman Reef, and Navassa Island. The remaining three islands in the U.S. Minor Outlying Islands (Midway Atoll, Palmyra Atoll and Wake Island) have small non-permanent human populations. The county equivalent with the smallest non-zero population counted in the census is Swains Island, American Samoa (17 people), although since 2008 this population has not been permanent either.

The most densely populated county or county equivalent is New York County, New York (coextensive with the New York City Borough of Manhattan), with 72,033 persons per square mile (27,812 persons/km^{2}) in 2015. The Yukon–Koyukuk Census Area, Alaska, is both the most extensive and the least densely populated county or county equivalent with 0.0380 persons per square mile (0.0147 persons/km^{2}) in 2015.

In the 50 states (plus the District of Columbia), a total of 981 counties have a population over 50,000; 592 counties have a population over 100,000; 137 counties have a population over 500,000; 45 counties have a population over 1,000,000; and 14 counties have a population over 2,000,000. At the other extreme, 35 counties have a population under 1,000; 307 counties have a population under 5,000; 709 counties have a population under 10,000; and 1,492 counties have a population between 10,000 and 50,000.

=== Area ===
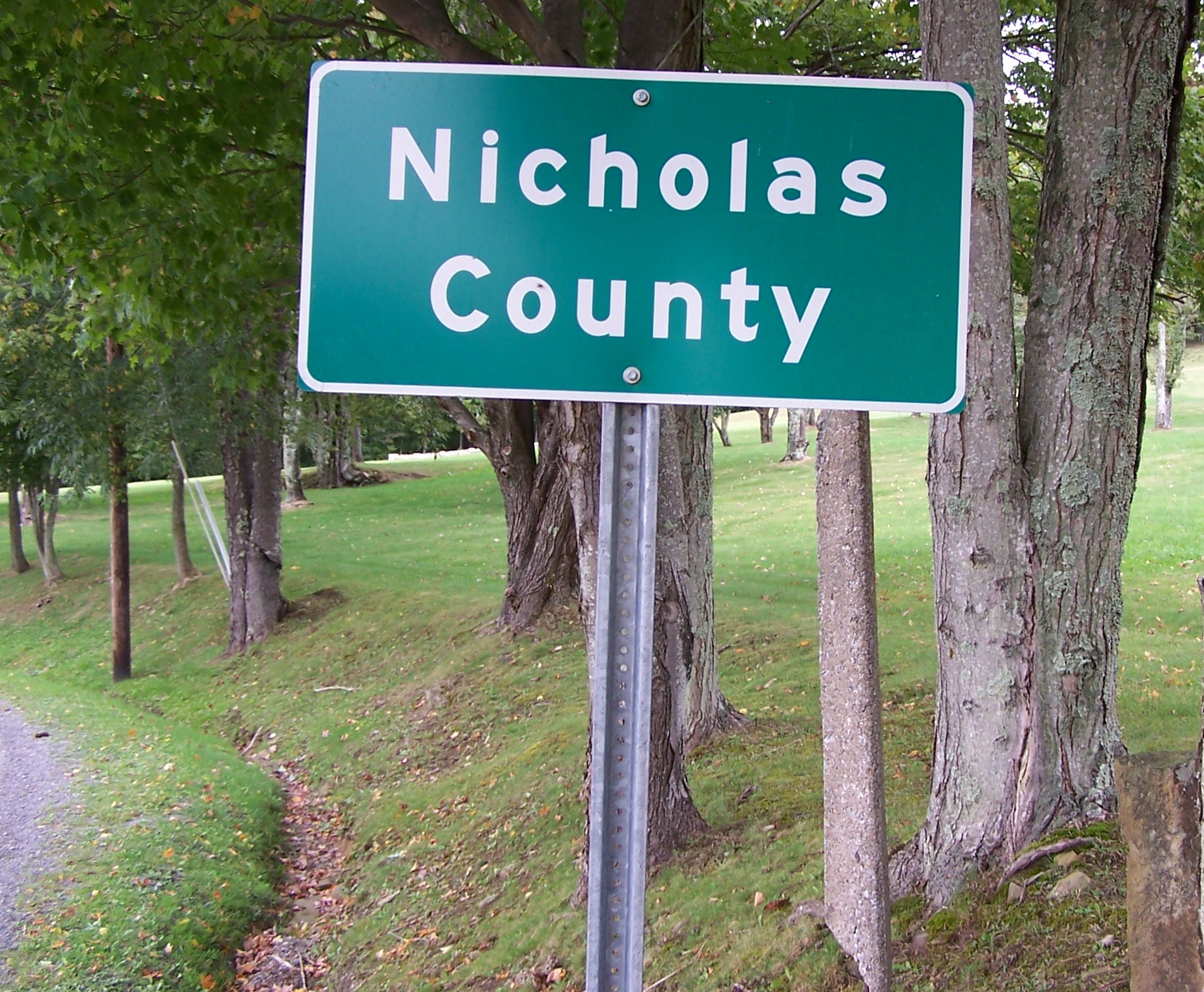
A highway sign designating the border between Nicholas and Greenbrier counties in West Virginia along a secondary road

At the 2000 U.S. census, the median land area of U.S. counties was 622 sq mi (1,610 km^{2}), which is two-thirds of the median land area of a ceremonial county of England, and a little more than a quarter of the median land area of a French département. Counties in the western United States typically have a much larger land area than those in the eastern United States. For example, the median land area of counties in Georgia is 343 sq mi (890 km^{2}), whereas in Utah it is 2,427 sq mi (6,290 km^{2}).

The most extensive county or county equivalent is the Yukon–Koyukuk Census Area, Alaska, with a land area of 145,505 square miles (376,856 km^{2}). All nine of the most extensive county equivalents are in Alaska. The most extensive county is San Bernardino County, California, with a land area of 20,057 square miles (51,947 km^{2}). The least extensive county is Kalawao County, Hawaii, with a land area of 11.991 square miles (31.058 km^{2}). The least extensive county equivalent in the 50 states is the independent city of Falls Church, Virginia, with a land area of 1.999 square miles (5.177 km^{2}). If U.S. territories are included, the least extensive county equivalent is Kingman Reef, with a land area of 0.01 square miles (0.03 km^{2}).

== Geographic relationships between cities and counties ==
In some states, a municipality may be in only one county and may not annex territory in adjacent counties, but in the majority of states, the state constitution or state law allows municipalities to extend across county boundaries. At least 32 states include municipalities in multiple counties. Dallas, for example, contains portions of five counties, while numerous other cities comprise portions of four counties. New York City is an unusual case because it encompasses multiple entire counties in one city. Each of those counties is coextensive with one of the five boroughs of the city: Manhattan (New York County), The Bronx (Bronx County), Queens (Queens County), Brooklyn (Kings County), and Staten Island (Richmond County).

== See also ==
- Index of U.S. counties
- Lists of counties in the United States
  - List of United States counties and county equivalents
    - Consolidated city-county
    - List of former United States counties
    - List of highest counties in the United States
    - List of highest U.S. county high points
    - List of the most common U.S. county names
- List of FIPS codes
- Census geographic units of Canada
- Municipalities of Mexico
