= USS Marion County =

1945 LST-542-class tank landing ship

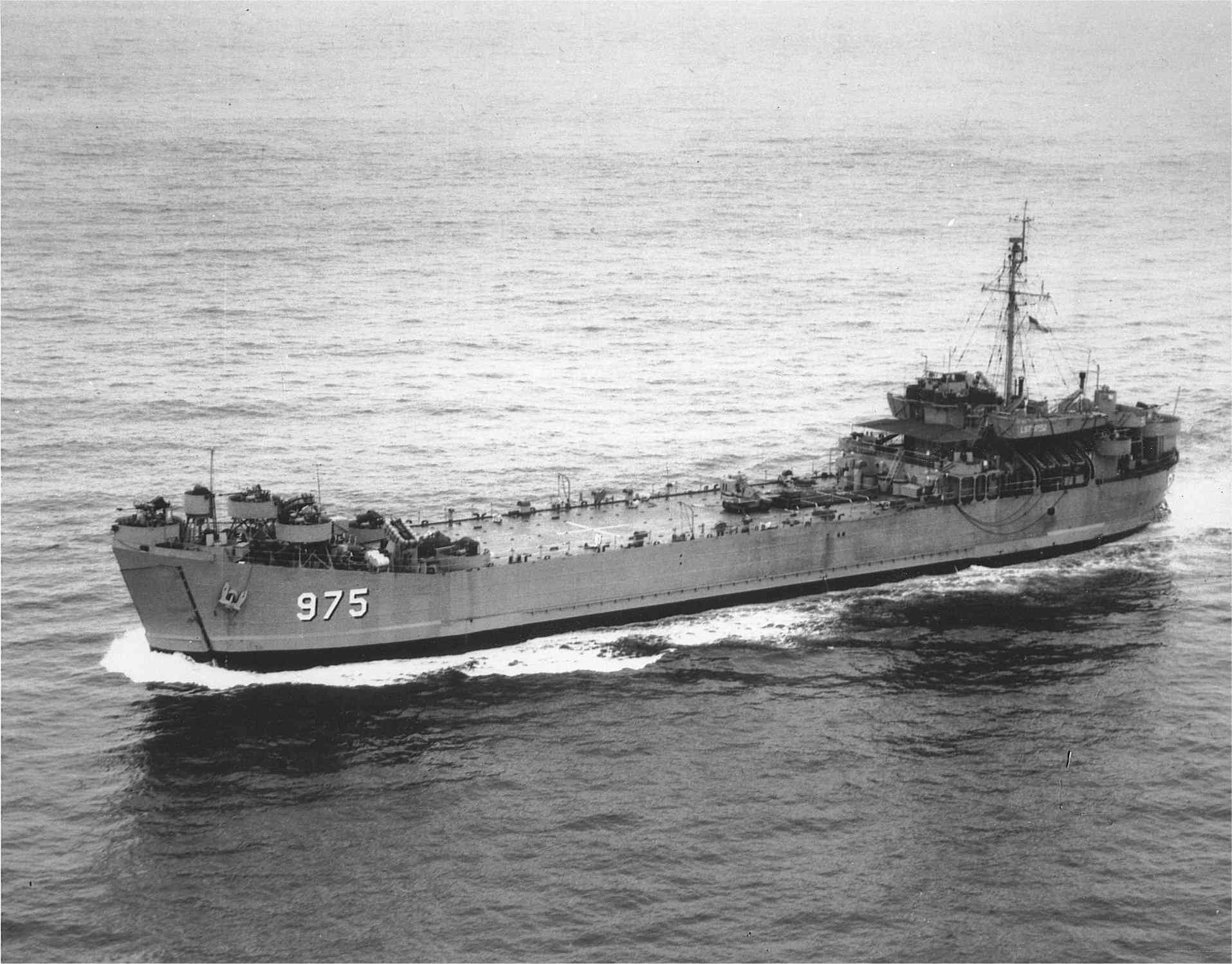
- USS LST-975 underway, date and location unknown

History

United States
- Name: LST-975
- Builder: Bethlehem-Hingham Shipyard, Hingham, Massachusetts
- Yard number: 3445
- Laid down: 1 December 1944
- Launched: 6 January 1945
- Sponsored by: Miss Alice J. Varian
- Commissioned: 3 February 1945
- Decommissioned: 16 April 1946
- Stricken: unknown date
- Identification: Hull symbol: LST-975; Code letters: NKKU
- Fate: Turned over to the US Army

United States
- Name: T-LST-975
- Operator: Military Sea Transportation Service (MSTS)
- In service: 1 July 1950
- Out of service: 28 August 1950
- Identification: Hull symbol: T-LST-975
- Fate: Recommissioned by the US Navy

United States
- Name: LST-975; Marion County
- Recommissioned: 28 August 1950
- Decommissioned: 10 May 1956
- Renamed: Marion County, 1 July 1955 6 × battle stars
- Identification: Hull symbol: LST-975
- Fate: Custody returned to MSTS

United States
- Name: Marion County
- Operator: MSTS
- In service: 10 May 1956
- Out of service: 26 September 1957
- Stricken: 1 June 1963
- Identification: Hull symbol: T-LST-975
- Fate: Laid up in National Defense Reserve Fleet, Suisun Bay Group, Benicia, California; Transferred to the Republic of Vietnam, 12 April 1962
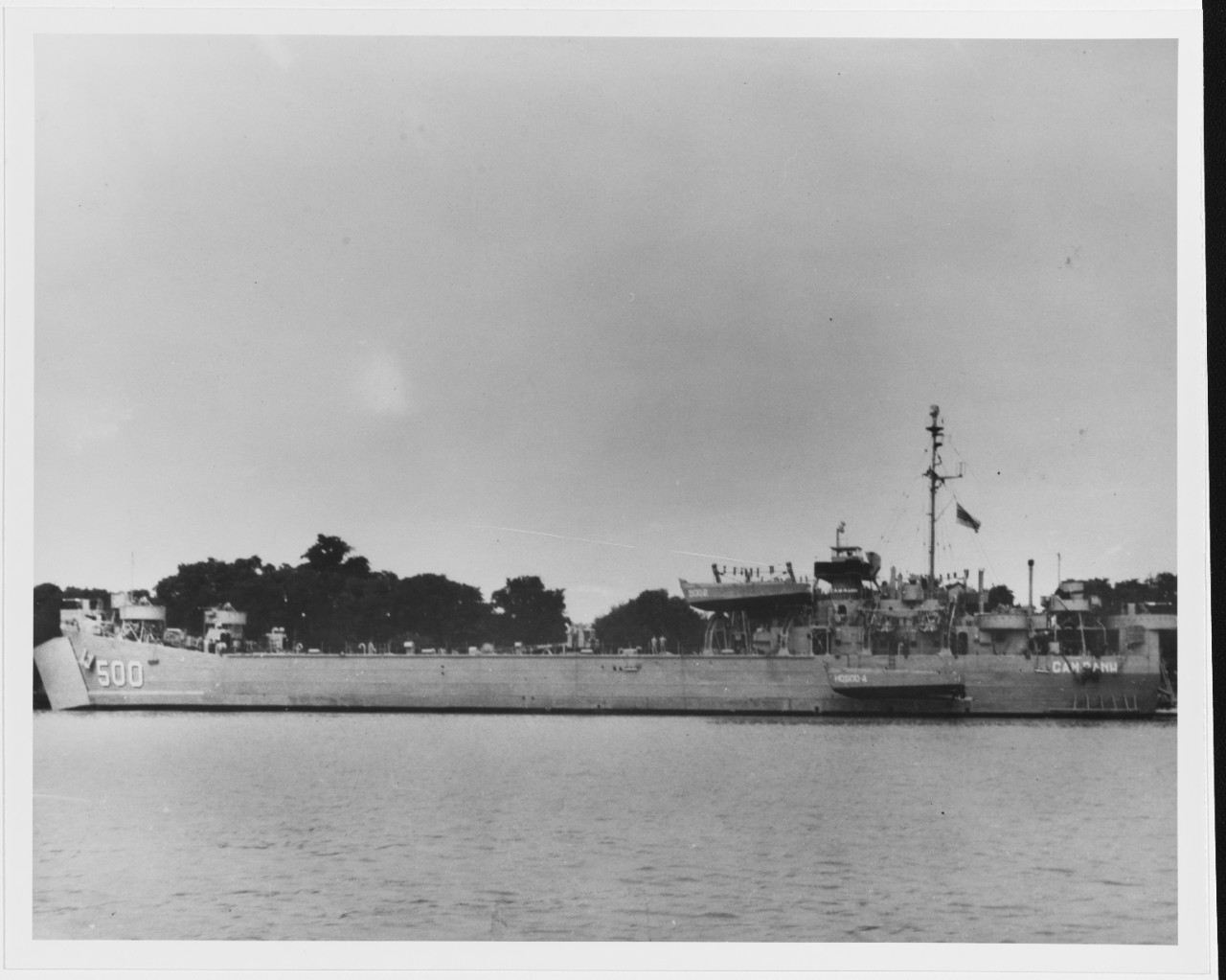
- Cam Ranh (HQ-500) (South Vietnamese LST, ex-USS MARION COUNTY (LST-975), ex-LST-975)

South Vietnam
- Name: Cam Ranh
- Namesake: City of Cam Ranh
- Acquired: 12 April 1962
- Identification: Hull symbol: HQ-500
- Fate: Escaped to the Philippines, April 1975

Philippines
- Name: Zamboanga del Sur
- Namesake: The Province of Zamboanga del Sur
- Acquired: 17 November 1975
- Identification: Hull symbol: LT-86
- Fate: Sold for scrapping

General characteristics
- Class & type: LST-542-class tank landing ship
- Displacement: 1,625 long tons (1,651 t) (light); 4,080 long tons (4,145 t) (full (seagoing draft with 1,675 short tons (1,520 t) load); 2,366 long tons (2,404 t) (beaching)
- Length: 328 ft (100 m) oa
- Beam: 50 ft (15 m)
- Draft: Unloaded: 2 ft 4 in (0.71 m) forward; 7 ft 6 in (2.29 m) aft; Full load: 8 ft 3 in (2.51 m) forward; 14 ft 1 in (4.29 m) aft; Landing with 500 short tons (450 t) load: 3 ft 11 in (1.19 m) forward; 9 ft 10 in (3.00 m) aft; Limiting 11 ft 2 in (3.40 m); Maximum navigation 14 ft 1 in (4.29 m)
- Installed power: 2 × 900 hp (670 kW) Electro-Motive Diesel 12-567A diesel engines; 1,800 shp (1,300 kW)
- Propulsion: 1 × Falk main reduction gears; 2 × Propellers
- Speed: 11.6 kn (21.5 km/h; 13.3 mph)
- Range: 24,000 nmi (44,000 km; 28,000 mi) at 9 kn (17 km/h; 10 mph) while displacing 3,960 long tons (4,024 t)
- Boats & landing craft carried: 2 x LCVPs
- Capacity: 1,600–1,900 short tons (3,200,000–3,800,000 lb; 1,500,000–1,700,000 kg) cargo depending on mission
- Troops: 16 officers, 147 enlisted men
- Complement: 13 officers, 104 enlisted men
- Armament: Varied, ultimate armament; 2 × twin 40 mm (1.57 in) Bofors guns; 4 × single 40 mm Bofors guns; 12 × 20 mm (0.79 in) Oerlikon cannons

USS Marion County (LST-975) was an LST-542-class tank landing ship built for the United States Navy during World War II. Like many of her class, she was not named and is properly referred to by her hull designation. She was later named after counties in seventeen U.S. states, she was the only US Naval vessel to bear the name.

== Construction ==
LST-975 was laid down on 1 December 1944, at Hingham, Massachusetts, by the Bethlehem-Hingham Shipyard; launched on 6 January 1945; sponsored by Miss Alice J. Varian; and commissioned on 3 February 1945.

== Service history ==
=== World War II ===
After shakedown in Chesapeake Bay, LST-975 departed New York, on 27 March 1945, for the Pacific, via the Panama Canal. She arrived in Pearl Harbor, Hawaii, on 1 May, for amphibious warfare exercises in the Maui area.

She steamed to Seattle, Washington, arriving on 13 June to embark 119 US Army troops and equipment. Sailing on 28 June, via Hawaii, Eniwetok, and Saipan, she arrived Okinawa, on 17 August, two days after the Japanese surrender.

On 23 August, she got underway for Saipan, to embark men and equipment of the 2nd Marine Division for the occupation of Japan. LST-975 reached Nagasaki, on 24 September, and began unloading. Two days later she continued on to the Philippines, entering San Pedro Bay, Leyte Gulf, on 7 October. LST-975 again got underway for Japan six days later, embarked men and equipment of the Army's 52nd Field Artillery Battalion at Mindanao, en route, and arrived at Maysuyama, on 25 October, to disembark passengers and cargo. She returned to the Philippines from Honshū, 29 October, mooring at Manila, on 6 November. The ship spent the next five months conveying troops and equipment between the various ports of the Philippines until she decommissioned in Subic Bay, Luzon, on 16 April 1946, and was turned over to the Army for operations in the Far East.

=== Korean War ===
LST-975 was still in service there when at 04:00 on 25 June 1950, the North Korean People's Army struck south across the 38th Parallel. On 27 June, President Harry S. Truman ordered American naval and air support of the Republic of Korea. That afternoon the Security Council called upon all members of the United Nations to assist in repelling the North Korean attack. With the need for shipping for an immediate large-scale lift of troops and supplies, LST-975 was assigned to the Military Sea Transportation Service (MSTS) on 1 July, to be crewed by Japanese civilians. On 28 August, she recommissioned at Yokosuka, Japan. After training out of Kobe, Japan, LST-975 joined the Amphibious Forces, Pacific Fleet, and arrived off Inchon, Korea, on 15 September, for supply duty through the landings on 15 to 17 September, and into the middle of October. That first day she was repeatedly harassed by sniper fire as she beached on "Red Beach"; a mortar shell wounded one man. While she unloaded during the next few days, Marine casualties were brought on board for care by Surgical Team 3. Completing unloading by 17 September, she spent the next month on ship-to-shore supply operations.

On 15 October, the tank landing ship departed Inchon, for Wonsan, arriving 25 October, five days after the original landings. The difficulties of land transportation on the peninsula repeatedly emphasized the key importance of seaborne supply. LST-975's supply runs lasted into the middle of 1951. She departed Yokosuka, Japan, on 1 May, for the west coast, arriving at San Diego, 26 May, and operated along the California coast for the next eight months before returning to the Far East. LST-975 arrived off Yokosuka, on 11 March 1952. She again supported the deterrent efforts of the United Nations Forces in Korea from 4 April, during protracted armistice negotiations, until departing on 20 October, for the west coast.

=== Inter-war ===
On 19 June 1953, LST-975 sailed via Seattle and Point Barrow, to resupply Distant Early Warning Line (DEWS) radar stations along the Arctic Circle. On 25 August, she departed Seward, Alaska, to resume operations out of San Diego, until 19 October, when she got underway for another cruise to the Far East. Following arrival at Yokosuka, on 13 November, the tank landing ship spent nearly five months in amphibious warfare training. From 23 to 26 March 1954, she participated in a simulated assault landing on Iwo Jima – nearly a decade after the World War II operation on 19 February 1945. Returning to the west coast, the LST arrived at San Diego, on 20 May, for two years of coastal duty. Renamed Marion County on 1 July 1955, she departed San Diego, on 9 January 1956, for training exercises off Hawaii and the Philippines.

After a stay in the Long Beach, California, area from 14 April to 5 May, Marion County sailed for Portland, Oregon, arriving on 9 May. The next day she decommissioned and was turned back over to MSTS. The ship operated in the Pacific until 26 September 1957, when she entered the MSTS "ready reserve" fleet at Suisun Bay, California. Marion County remained there until 21 October 1960, when she was returned to the Navy account to be placed in temporary custody of the Maritime Commission.

=== Transfer to South Vietnam Navy ===
On 12 April 1962 Marion County was transferred under the Military Assistance Program to the Republic of Vietnam. Struck from the Naval Vessel Register on 1 June 1963, she served South Vietnam as RVNS Cam Ranh (HQ-500). Following the Fall of Saigon on 29 April 1975, Cam Ranh escaped to the Philippines. Transferred to the Philippine Navy on 17 November 1975, the ship was renamed BRP Zamboanga del Sur (LT-86), and decommissioned between 2013 and 2014.

== Awards ==
LST-975 received six battle stars for Korean War service.

== Bibliography ==
Online resources

- "LST-975". Dictionary of American Naval Fighting Ships. Naval History and Heritage Command. This article incorporates text from this source, which is in the public domain.
- "Marion County". Dictionary of American Naval Fighting Ships. Naval History and Heritage Command. 6 August 2015. This article incorporates text from this source, which is in the public domain.
- "Bethlehem-Hingham, Hingham MA". ShipbuildingHistory.com. 11 August 2011.
- "USS LST-975". NavSource. 27 May 2016.
