= Custard (disambiguation) =

Custard is food based on sweetened milk, cheese, or cream cooked with egg or egg yolk.

Custard may also refer to:

- Bird's Custard, a brand name for powdered, egg-free custard powder
- Custard powder
- Custard (Australian band), an Australian band
- Custard (German band), a German power metal band
- Custard Records, an American record label
- "Custard" (Danger Mouse), a 1982 television episode
- Custard, a fictional cat in Roobarb
- Custard, a fictional cat of Strawberry Shortcake

== See also ==
- Custer (disambiguation)
- Custards, Pennsylvania, a place in the U.S.
- List of custard desserts
