= Athens-Clarke County =

Athens-Clarke County may refer to

- Athens, Georgia
- Clarke County, Georgia
- Athens-Clarke County metropolitan area

== See also ==
- Athens (disambiguation)
- Clarke County (disambiguation)
