= Green Township, Pennsylvania =

Green Township is the name of some places in the U.S. state of Pennsylvania:

- Green Township, Forest County, Pennsylvania
- Green Township, Indiana County, Pennsylvania

== See also ==
- Greene Township, Pennsylvania (disambiguation)
- Greenfield Township, Pennsylvania (disambiguation)
- Greenville Township, Pennsylvania
- Greenwich Township, Pennsylvania
- Greenwood Township, Pennsylvania (disambiguation)
