= Greenfield Township, Pennsylvania =

Greenfield Township is the name of some places in the U.S. state of Pennsylvania:

- Greenfield Township, Blair County, Pennsylvania
- Greenfield Township, Erie County, Pennsylvania
- Greenfield Township, Lackawanna County, Pennsylvania

== See also ==
- Green Township, Pennsylvania (disambiguation)
- Greene Township, Pennsylvania (disambiguation)
- Greenville Township, Pennsylvania
- Greenwich Township, Pennsylvania
- Greenwood Township, Pennsylvania (disambiguation)
