= Russell County Schools =

Russell County Schools may refer to:

- Russell County USD 407 (Kansas)
- Russell County School District (Alabama)
- Russell County Schools (Kentucky), in List of school districts in Kentucky
- Russell County, Virginia#Education

== See also ==
- Russell County (disambiguation)
