= Custer (disambiguation) =

George Armstrong Custer (1839–1876) was an American Civil War general and Indian fighter.

Custer may also refer to:

- Custer's Last Stand, also known as the Battle of the Little Bighorn

== Places ==
- Custer, Idaho
- Custer, Kentucky
- Custer, Michigan
- Custer, Missouri
- Custer, Montana
- Custer, South Dakota
- Custer, Washington
- Custer, Wisconsin
- Custer Airport, Monroe, Michigan
- Custer City, Oklahoma
- Custer National Cemetery, at Little Bighorn Battlefield National Monument in Montana
- Custer National Forest, Montana and South Dakota
- Custer State Park, South Dakota

== People with the name ==
- Custer (surname)
- Custer LaRue, soprano

== Other uses ==
- "Custer" (song), a 2014 song by Slipknot from .5: The Gray Chapter
- Custer (TV series) a 1967 TV series starring Wayne Maunder
- Custer (book), a 2012 non-fiction book by Larry McMurtry

== See also ==
- Custer County (disambiguation)
- Custer Township (disambiguation)
