= Greene =

Greene may refer to:

== Places ==
=== United States ===
- Greene, Indiana, an unincorporated community
- Greene, Iowa, a city
- Greene, Maine, a town
  - Greene (CDP), Maine, in the town of Greene
- Greene (town), New York
  - Greene (village), New York, in the town of Greene
- Greene, Rhode Island, a village and census-designated place
- Greene County (disambiguation), 14 counties
- Greene Township, Pennsylvania (disambiguation), seven townships
- Greene Mountain - see List of mountains in Virginia
- Greene Island (Rhode Island)
- Camp Greene, a former United States Army facility in Charlotte, North Carolina

=== Canada ===
- Greene Island (Lake Ontario), an island in Lake Ontario
- Greene Island (Lake Huron), an island in Lake Huron

== People ==
- Greene C. Bronson (1789–1863), American lawyer and politician

== Other uses ==
- USS Greene (DD-266), a World War II destroyer
- Greene Avenue (Montreal), Quebec, Canada
- The Greene Town Center, also known as The Greene, a mixed-use, office, retail, dining and entertainment center in Beavercreek, Ohio
- State Correctional Institution – Greene, a maximum security prison in Franklin Township, Greene County, Pennsylvania
- Greene Rifle, early single-shot rifles with only an underhammer breachloading system

== See also ==
- Greene and Greene, American architects
- Greene Building, Rensselaer Polytechnic Institute
- Greene House (disambiguation)
- Green (disambiguation)
- Greener (disambiguation)
