= Greene Township, Pennsylvania =

Greene Township is the name of some places in the U.S. state of Pennsylvania:

- Greene Township, Beaver County, Pennsylvania
- Greene Township, Clinton County, Pennsylvania
- Greene Township, Erie County, Pennsylvania
- Greene Township, Franklin County, Pennsylvania
- Greene Township, Greene County, Pennsylvania
- Greene Township, Mercer County, Pennsylvania
- Greene Township, Pike County, Pennsylvania

== See also ==
- Green Township, Pennsylvania (disambiguation)
- Greenfield Township, Pennsylvania (disambiguation)
- Greenville Township, Pennsylvania
- Greenwich Township, Pennsylvania
- Greenwood Township, Pennsylvania (disambiguation)
