= Greenwood Township, Pennsylvania =

Greenwood Township is the name of some places in the Commonwealth of Pennsylvania, a U.S. state:

- Greenwood Township, Clearfield County, Pennsylvania
- Greenwood Township, Columbia County, Pennsylvania
- Greenwood Township, Crawford County, Pennsylvania
- Greenwood Township, Juniata County, Pennsylvania
- Greenwood Township, Perry County, Pennsylvania

== See also ==
- Green Township, Pennsylvania (disambiguation)
- Greenfield Township, Pennsylvania (disambiguation)
- Greenville Township, Pennsylvania
- Greenwich Township, Pennsylvania
