= Grey County (disambiguation) =

Grey County is a county in Ontario, Canada.

Grey County may also refer to:

- Grey County, New Zealand
- Grey County, Western Australia

== See also ==
- County of Grey, South Australia
- Gray County (disambiguation)
