= Lin County =

Lin County or Linxian may refer to the following places in China:

- Linzhou, Henan, formerly Lin County (林县), of Anyang, Henan
- Lin County, Shanxi (临县), of Lüliang, Shanxi

== See also ==
- Linn County
