= Crook County =

Crook County may refer to:

- Crook County, Oregon, United States
- Crook County, Wyoming, United States
- USS Crook County (LST-611), a United States Navy tank landing ship
- Crook County, a 2008 album by The Dirtball
- Crook County, a 2017 album by American rapper Twista

== See also ==
- Cook County (disambiguation)
