= Vernon County =

Vernon County may refer to:

== Places ==
- Vernon County, New South Wales, Australia
- Vernon County, Missouri, U.S.
- Vernon County, Wisconsin, U.S.

== Other uses ==
- USS Vernon County (LST-1161), a United States Navy tank landing ship in commission from 1953 to 1973

== See also ==
- Vernon County Courthouse (disambiguation)
- Vernon Parish, Louisiana, U.S.
