= Hamilton County Fair =

Hamilton County Fair is the name of a county fair in several counties named Hamilton in the United States:

- Hamilton County Fair (Illinois)
- Hamilton County Fair (Indiana)
- Hamilton County Fair (Iowa)
- Hamilton County Fair (Kansas)
- Hamilton County Fair (Nebraska)
- Hamilton County Fair (Ohio)
- Hamilton County Fair (Tennessee)
