= Williamson County =

Williamson County may refer to:

- Williamson County, Illinois
- Williamson County, Tennessee
- Williamson County, Texas

== See also ==
- Williamson County Courthouse (disambiguation)
