= Pickens County =

Pickens County may refer to:

- Pickens County, Alabama
- Pickens County, Georgia
- Pickens County, South Carolina

== See also ==
- Pickens County Airport (disambiguation)
