= Clark County =

Clark County may refer to:

- Clark County, Arkansas
- Clark County, Idaho
- Clark County, Illinois
- Clark County, Indiana
- Clark County, Kansas
- Clark County, Kentucky
- Clark County, Missouri
- Clark County, Nevada, containing Las Vegas
- Clark County, Ohio
- Clark County, South Dakota
- Clark County, Washington
- Clark County, Wisconsin

== See also ==
- Clarke County (disambiguation)
- Lewis and Clark County, Montana
