= Wayne County =

Wayne County may refer to:

== Counties in the United States ==
- Wayne County, Georgia
- Wayne County, Illinois
- Wayne County, Indiana
- Wayne County, Iowa
- Wayne County, Kentucky
- Wayne County, Michigan
- Wayne County, Mississippi
- Wayne County, Missouri
- Wayne County, Nebraska
- Wayne County, New York
- Wayne County, North Carolina
- Wayne County, Ohio
- Wayne County, Pennsylvania
- Wayne County, Tennessee
- Wayne County, Utah
- Wayne County, West Virginia

== Entertainment ==
- Wayne County & the Electric Chairs, an American punk rock band
  - Wayne County (now Jayne County), an American musician in the above band
