= Hamilton County =

Hamilton County is the name of ten counties in the United States of America, eight of them named for Alexander Hamilton, the first United States Secretary of the Treasury:

- Hamilton County, Florida
- Hamilton County, Illinois
- Hamilton County, Indiana
- Hamilton County, Iowa (named for William W. Hamilton, president of the Iowa state senate)
- Hamilton County, Kansas, the least populous county on the list
- Hamilton County, Nebraska
- Hamilton County, New York, the most sparsely populated county in the eastern half of the United States
- Hamilton County, Ohio, the most populous county on the list
- Hamilton County, Tennessee
- Hamilton County, Texas (named for James Hamilton Jr., Governor of South Carolina from 1830 to 1832)

== See also ==
- Hamilton County Fair (disambiguation)
