= Linn County =

Linn County is the name of four counties in the United States:

- Linn County, Iowa, most populous Linn County in the United States
- Linn County, Kansas
- Linn County, Missouri
- Linn County, Oregon

== See also ==
- Linn County (band)
- Lynn County, Texas
- Lin County
