= Gray County =

Gray County is the name of two counties in the United States:

- Gray County, Kansas
- Gray County, Texas

== See also ==
- Grey County (disambiguation)
