= USS Crook County =

US Navy landing ship

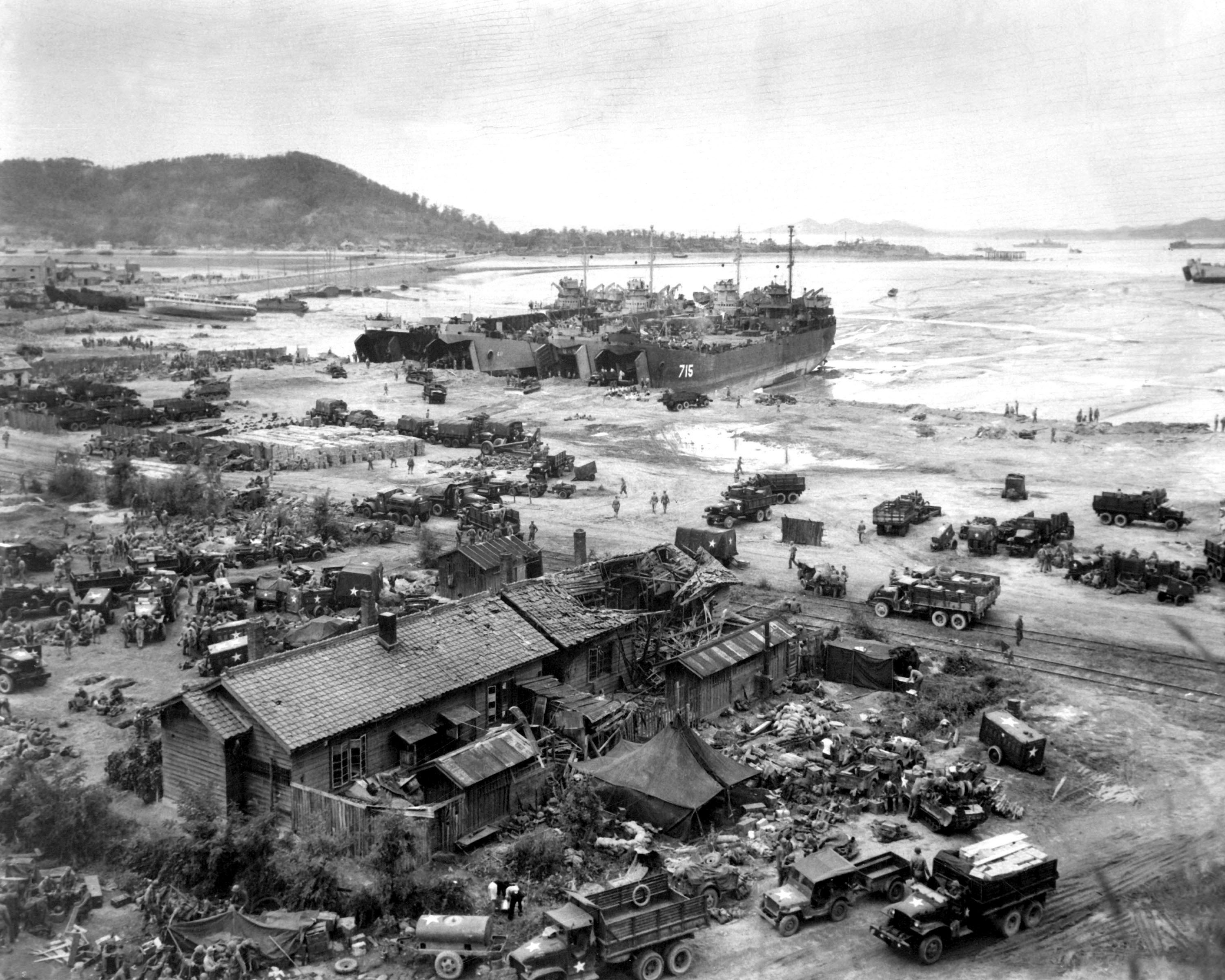
- LST-611, one of four LSTs on beach, unloads at Inchon, 16 September 1950

History

United States
- Name: USS LST-611, later USS Crook County
- Namesake: Crook County, Oregon, and Crook County, Wyoming
- Builder: Chicago Bridge and Iron Company, Seneca, Illinois
- Laid down: 17 December 1943
- Launched: 28 April 1944
- Sponsored by: Mrs. Ray Hines
- Commissioned: 15 May 1944
- Decommissioned: 26 October 1956
- Renamed: USS Crook County (LST-611), 1 July 1955
- Honors and awards: 2 battle stars for World War II; 3 battle stars for Korean War

General characteristics
- Class & type: LST-542-class tank landing ship
- Displacement: 1,780 long tons (1,809 t) light; 3,640 long tons (3,698 t) full
- Length: 328 ft (100 m)
- Beam: 50 ft (15 m)
- Draft: Unloaded : 2 ft 4 in (0.71 m) forward; 7 ft 6 in (2.29 m) aft; Loaded : 8 ft 2 in (2.49 m) forward; 14 ft 1 in (4.29 m) aft
- Propulsion: 2 × General Motors 12-567 diesel engines, two shafts, twin rudders
- Speed: 12 knots (22 km/h; 14 mph)
- Boats & landing craft carried: 2 LCVPs
- Troops: 140 officers and enlisted men
- Complement: 8–10 officers, 100–115 enlisted men
- Armament: 1 × single 3-inch/50-caliber gun mount; 8 × 40 mm guns; 12 × 20 mm guns

USS Crook County (LST-611), originally USS LST-611, was a United States Navy LST-542-class tank landing ship built during World War II and in commission from 1944 to 1956. Named after Crook County, Oregon, and Crook County, Wyoming, she has been the only U.S. Navy vessel to bear the name.

LST-611 was laid down on 17 December 1943 at Seneca, Illinois, by the Chicago Bridge and Iron Company. She was launched on 28 April 1944, sponsored by Mrs. Ray Hines, and commissioned on 15 May 1944.

== Service history ==
During World War II, LST-611 was assigned to the Pacific Theater of Operations and participated in the Leyte landing in October 1944 and the Mindoro landing in December 1944.

LST-611 operated with the Amphibious Force, United States Pacific Fleet, following World War II and participated in the Inchon landings in September 1950 during the Korean War.

On 1 July 1955, LST-611 was renamed USS Crook County (LST-611). On 26 October 1956 she was placed in service, in reserve, in caretaker status.

== Honors and awards ==
LST-611 earned two battle stars for World War II service and three battle stars for Korean War service.
