= Beckham County =

Beckham County can refer to:

- Beckham County, Kentucky
- Beckham County, Oklahoma

Both were named for J. C. W. Beckham, who served as Governor of Kentucky and as a member of the United States Senate from Kentucky.
