= Stevens County =

Stevens County is the name of several counties in the United States:

- Stevens County, Kansas
- Stevens County, Minnesota
- Stevens County, Washington

== See also ==
- Stephens County (disambiguation)
