= Mercer County =

Mercer County is the name of several counties in the United States:

- Mercer County, New Jersey, the most populous U.S. county named Mercer and home to New Jersey's capital city, Trenton
- Mercer County, Illinois
- Mercer County, Kentucky
- Mercer County, Missouri
- Mercer County, North Dakota
- Mercer County, Ohio
- Mercer County, Pennsylvania
- Mercer County, Virginia, has existed twice; the two counties continue in existence with the same name in Kentucky and West Virginia
- Mercer County, West Virginia
