= Coos County =

Coos County is the name of two counties in the United States:

- Coös County, New Hampshire
- Coos County, Oregon
