= Cook County (disambiguation) =

Cook County is a county in Illinois, United States.

Cook County may also refer to:

- Cook County, Georgia, United States
- Cook County, Minnesota, United States
- Cooke County, Texas, United States
- Cook County, New South Wales, Australia
- County of Cook, Queensland, Australia
- Cook County, New Zealand, one of the former counties of New Zealand on the North Island
- Cook County (film)

== See also ==
- Cook (disambiguation)
- Crook County (disambiguation)
