= Vermilion County =

Vermilion County or Vermillion County may refer to the following counties in the United States:

- Vermilion County, Illinois
- Vermillion County, Indiana

== See also ==
- County of Vermilion River, Alberta, Canada
- Vermilion Parish, Louisiana
