= Morgan County =

Morgan County is the name of eleven counties in the United States of America, nine of which were named for Daniel Morgan, Revolutionary War General:

- Morgan County, Alabama
- Morgan County, Colorado (named for Colonel Christopher A. Morgan)
- Morgan County, Georgia
- Morgan County, Illinois
- Morgan County, Indiana
- Morgan County, Kentucky
- Morgan County, Missouri
- Morgan County, Ohio
- Morgan County, Tennessee
- Morgan County, Utah (named for Jedediah Morgan Grant, father of Heber J. Grant)
- Morgan County, West Virginia
