= Greene County =

Greene County may refer to:

- Greene County, Alabama
- Greene County, Arkansas
- Greene County, Georgia
- Greene County, Illinois
- Greene County, Indiana
- Greene County, Iowa
- Greene County, Mississippi
- Greene County, Missouri
- Greene County, New York
- Greene County, North Carolina
- Greene County, Ohio
- Greene County, Pennsylvania
- Greene County, Tennessee
- Greene County, Virginia

== See also ==
- Green County (disambiguation)
- Greene (disambiguation)
