= DeWitt County =

DeWitt County is the name of two counties in the United States:

- DeWitt County, Illinois
- DeWitt County, Texas
