= Pike County =

Pike County is the name of ten counties in the United States:

- Pike County, Alabama
- Pike County, Arkansas
- Pike County, Georgia
- Pike County, Illinois
- Pike County, Indiana
- Pike County, Kentucky
- Pike County, Mississippi
- Pike County, Missouri
- Pike County, Ohio
- Pike County, Pennsylvania

All were named to honor Zebulon Pike.
