= Lee County =

Lee County is the name of twelve counties in the United States:

- Lee County, Alabama
- Lee County, Arkansas
- Lee County, Florida
- Lee County, Georgia
- Lee County, Illinois
- Lee County, Iowa
- Lee County, Kentucky
- Lee County, Mississippi
- Lee County, North Carolina
- Lee County, South Carolina
- Lee County, Texas
- Lee County, Virginia
