= Johnson County =

Johnson County is the name of several counties in the United States:

- Johnson County, Arkansas
- Johnson County, Georgia
- Johnson County, Illinois
- Johnson County, Indiana
- Johnson County, Iowa
- Johnson County, Kansas
- Johnson County, Kentucky
- Johnson County, Missouri
- Johnson County, Nebraska
- Johnson County, Tennessee
- Johnson County, Texas
- Johnson County, Wyoming

== See also ==
- Johnston County (disambiguation)
- Johnson County War, an 1892 range war in Wyoming
