= Williamson County Courthouse =

Williamson County Courthouse may refer to:

- Williamson County Courthouse (Illinois), in Marion, Illinois
- Williamson County Courthouse (Tennessee), Franklin, Tennessee
- Williamson County Courthouse (Texas), Georgetown, Texas
  - Williamson County Courthouse Historic District
