= Vernon County Courthouse =

Vernon County Courthouse may refer to:

- Vernon County Courthouse (Missouri), Nevada, Missouri
- Vernon County Courthouse (Wisconsin), Viroqua, Wisconsin
