= Harrison County =

Harrison County is the name of eight counties in the United States:

- Harrison County, Indiana
- Harrison County, Iowa
- Harrison County, Kentucky
- Harrison County, Mississippi
- Harrison County, Missouri
- Harrison County, Ohio
- Harrison County, Texas
- Harrison County, West Virginia
