= Shannon County =

Shannon County is the name of a county in the United States:

- Shannon County, Missouri

as well as:

- Oglala Lakota County, South Dakota, formerly Shannon County
