= Stephens County =

Stephens County is the name of three counties in the United States of America:

- Stephens County, Georgia
- Stephens County, Oklahoma
- Stephens County, Texas

== See also ==
- Stevens County (disambiguation)
