= Burnett County =

Burnett County may refer to:

- Burnet County, Texas
- Burnett County, Wisconsin
