= Marshall County =

Marshall County is the name of twelve counties in the United States:

- Marshall County, Alabama
- Marshall County, Illinois
- Marshall County, Indiana
- Marshall County, Iowa
- Marshall County, Kansas
- Marshall County, Kentucky
- Marshall County, Minnesota
- Marshall County, Mississippi
- Marshall County, Oklahoma
- Marshall County, South Dakota
- Marshall County, Tennessee
- Marshall County, West Virginia
