= Webster County =

Webster County may refer to the following counties in the United States:

- Webster County, Georgia
- Webster County, Iowa
- Webster County, Kentucky
- Webster County, Mississippi
- Webster County, Missouri
- Webster County, Nebraska
- Webster County, West Virginia

== See also ==
- Webster Parish, Louisiana
