= Johnston County =

Johnston County is the name of two counties in the United States:

- Johnston County, North Carolina
- Johnston County, Oklahoma

== See also ==
- Johnson County (disambiguation)
