= Macon County =

Macon County may refer to:

== United States ==
- Macon County, Alabama
- Macon County, Georgia
- Macon County, Illinois
- Macon County, Missouri
- Macon County, North Carolina
  - Macon County Airport
- Macon County, Tennessee

== Medieval France ==
- County of Mâcon

== See also ==
- Macon County Line, a 1974 film
  - Return to Macon County a 1975 sequel
