= Custer (surname) =

Custer is a surname. Notable people with the surname include:

- Bob Custer (1898–1974), American film actor
- Boston Custer (1848–1876), brother of George Armstrong Custer
- Clayton Custer (born 1995), American basketball player
- Cole Custer (born 1998), American racing driver
- Elizabeth Bacon Custer (1842–1933), wife of George Armstrong Custer
- George Armstrong Custer (1839–1876), American Civil War general
- Omer N. Custer (1873–1942), American politician
- Thomas Custer (1845–1876), brother of George Armstrong Custer, two-time recipient of the U.S. Army Medal of Honor
- Willard Ray Custer (1899–1985), inventor of channel wing airfoils
