= York County =

York County may refer to:

== Places ==
=== Australia ===
- York County, Western Australia
- County of York (South Australia)

=== Canada ===
- York County, New Brunswick
- York County, Ontario

=== United Kingdom ===
- Yorkshire, England
  - County of York, East Riding
  - County of York, North Riding
  - County of York, West Riding

=== United States ===
- York County, Maine
- York County, Massachusetts, a former county in what is now Maine
- York County, Nebraska
- York County, Pennsylvania
- York County, South Carolina
- York County, Virginia

== Other ==
- York County Community College, in Wells, Maine, United States
- York County Hospital, a former hospital in York, England

== See also ==
- New York County
