= La Salle County =

La Salle County refers to two counties and one parish in the United States, each named for French explorer René-Robert Cavelier, Sieur de La Salle:

- LaSalle County, Illinois
- LaSalle Parish, Louisiana
- La Salle County, Texas
