= Shelby County =

Shelby County may refer to:

== Counties ==
- Shelby County, Alabama
- Shelby County, Illinois
- Shelby County, Indiana
- Shelby County, Iowa
- Shelby County, Kentucky
- Shelby County, Missouri
- Shelby County, Ohio
- Shelby County, Tennessee
- Shelby County, Texas

== Other uses ==
- The U.S. Supreme Court case Shelby County v. Holder (2013)
