= Jones County =

Jones County is the name of six counties in the United States:

- Jones County, Georgia
- Jones County, Iowa
- Jones County, Mississippi
- Jones County, North Carolina
- Jones County, South Dakota
- Jones County, Texas

It was also the former name of two Alabama counties:

- Lamar County, Alabama. Established as Jones County on February 4, 1867, re-established as Sanford County on October 8, 1868, and renamed Lamar County on February 8, 1877.
- Covington County, Alabama. Renamed Jones County on August 6, 1868, the original name of Covington was restored on October 10, 1868.
