= Pickens County Airport =

Pickens County Airport may refer to:

- Pickens County Airport (Georgia) in Pickens County, Georgia, United States (FAA: JZP)
- Pickens County Airport (South Carolina) in Pickens County, South Carolina, United States (FAA: LQK)
- North Pickens Airport in Pickens County, Alabama, United States (FAA: 3M8)
