= Stanley County =

Stanley County may refer to:

- Stanley County, South Dakota, United States
- County of Stanley (South Australia), Australia

== See also ==
- Stanley (disambiguation)#Places
- Stanly County, North Carolina, United States
