= Green County =

Green County may refer to:

- Green County, Kentucky
- Green County, Wisconsin
- Tom Green County, Texas

== See also ==
- Greene County (disambiguation)
- Green Country, a tourism designation for Northeast Oklahoma
