= Taylor County =

Taylor County may refer to the following counties in the United States:

- Taylor County, Florida
- Taylor County, Georgia
- Taylor County, Iowa
- Taylor County, Kentucky
- Taylor County, Texas
- Taylor County, West Virginia
- Taylor County, Wisconsin
