= Scott County =

Scott County is the name of eleven counties in the United States of America:

- Scott County, Arkansas
- Scott County, Illinois
- Scott County, Indiana
- Scott County, Iowa, the most populous county on the list
- Scott County, Kansas, the least populous county on the list
- Scott County, Kentucky
- Scott County, Minnesota
- Scott County, Mississippi
- Scott County, Missouri
- Scott County, Tennessee
- Scott County, Virginia
