= Custer County =

Custer County is the name of six counties in the United States:

- Custer County, Colorado
- Custer County, Idaho
- Custer County, Montana
- Custer County, Nebraska
- Custer County, Oklahoma
- Custer County, South Dakota
