= Jefferson County =

Jefferson County may refer to the following counties in the United States:

- Jefferson County, Alabama
- Jefferson County, Arkansas
- Jefferson County, Colorado
  - Jefferson County, Jefferson Territory
- Jefferson County, Florida
- Jefferson County, Georgia
- Jefferson County, Idaho
- Jefferson County, Illinois
- Jefferson County, Indiana
- Jefferson County, Iowa
- Jefferson County, Kansas
- Jefferson County, Kentucky
- Jefferson County, Mississippi
- Jefferson County, Missouri
- Jefferson County, Montana
- Jefferson County, Nebraska
- Jefferson County, New York
- Jefferson County, Ohio
- Jefferson County, Oklahoma
- Jefferson County, Oregon
- Jefferson County, Pennsylvania
- Jefferson County, Tennessee
- Jefferson County, Texas
- Jefferson County, Virginia, has existed twice; the two counties continue in existence as Jefferson County, Kentucky and Jefferson County, West Virginia
- Jefferson County, Washington
- Jefferson County, West Virginia
- Jefferson County, Wisconsin

== See also ==
- Jefferson County (The Waltons), a fictional county in Virginia
- Jefferson Parish, Louisiana
- Jefferson Davis Parish, Louisiana
- Jefferson Davis County, Mississippi
- Jeff Davis County (disambiguation)
