= Marquette County =

Marquette County may refer to:

- Marquette County, Michigan, U.S.
- Marquette County, Wisconsin, U.S.
- Marquette County, a historic county in Manitoba, Canada
