= Clarke County =

Clarke County may refer to:

Places

- One of five counties in the United States:
  - Clarke County, Alabama
  - Clarke County, Georgia
  - Clarke County, Iowa
  - Clarke County, Mississippi
  - Clarke County, Virginia
- Clarke County, New South Wales, in Australia

Clarke County was also the official name of Clark County, Washington from 1849 until 1925, when the spelling was changed.

Ships

- USS Clarke County (LST-601), a United States Navy tank landing ship in commission as USS LST-601 from 1944 to 1955 and as USS Clarke County in 1955 and during the late 1960s

== See also ==
- Clark County (disambiguation)
