= Marion County =

Marion County is the name of seventeen counties in the United States of America, mostly named for General Francis Marion:

- Marion County, Alabama
- Marion County, Arkansas
- Marion County, Florida
- Marion County, Georgia
- Marion County, Illinois
- Marion County, Indiana
- Marion County, Iowa
- Marion County, Kansas
- Marion County, Kentucky
- Marion County, Mississippi
- Marion County, Missouri
- Marion County, Ohio
- Marion County, Oregon
- Marion County, South Carolina
- Marion County, Tennessee
- Marion County, Texas
- Marion County, West Virginia
