= Russell County =

Russell County may refer to:

In Australia:

- Russell Land District, formerly Russell County, Tasmania
- County of Russell, South Australia

In Canada:

- Russell County, Ontario

In the United States:

- Russell County, Alabama
- Russell County, Kansas
- Russell County, Kentucky
- Russell County, Virginia
