= Greenville Township, Pennsylvania =

Township in Pennsylvania, US

Coordinates: 39°44′00″N 78°57′29″W

Greenville Township, Somerset County, Pennsylvania
- Township
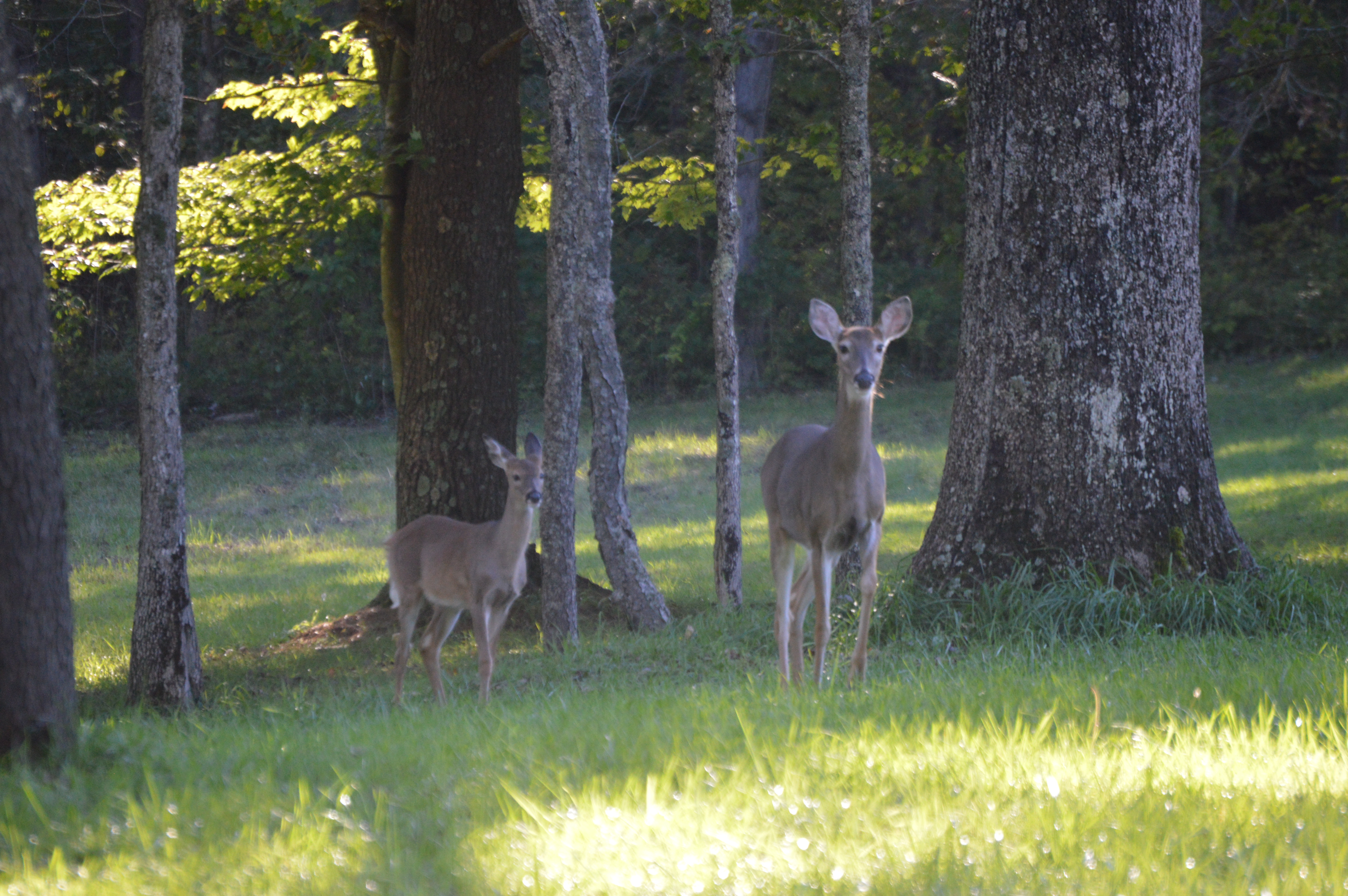
- Deer in one of the township's wooded areas

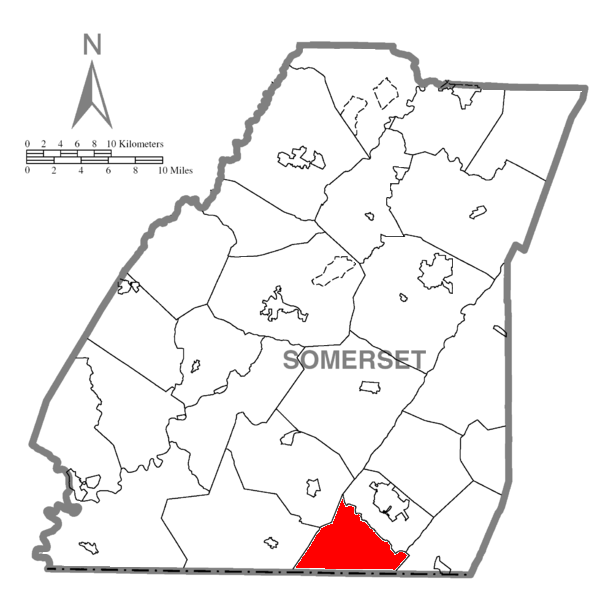
- Map of Somerset County, Pennsylvania Highlighting Greenville Township

- Map of Somerset County, Pennsylvania
- Country: United States
- State: Pennsylvania
- County: Somerset

Area
  - Total: 25.07 sq mi (64.93 km^{2})
  - Land: 25.06 sq mi (64.91 km^{2})
  - Water: 0.0077 sq mi (0.02 km^{2})

Population (2020)
  - Total: 752 ▲
  - Estimate (2021): 756
  - Density: 25.7/sq mi (9.92/km^{2})
- Time zone: UTC-5 (Eastern (EST))
  - Summer (DST): UTC-4 (EDT)
- FIPS code: 42-111-31336

Greenville Township is a township in Somerset County, Pennsylvania, United States. The population was 752 at the 2020 census. It is part of the Johnstown, Pennsylvania, Metropolitan Statistical Area.

== History ==
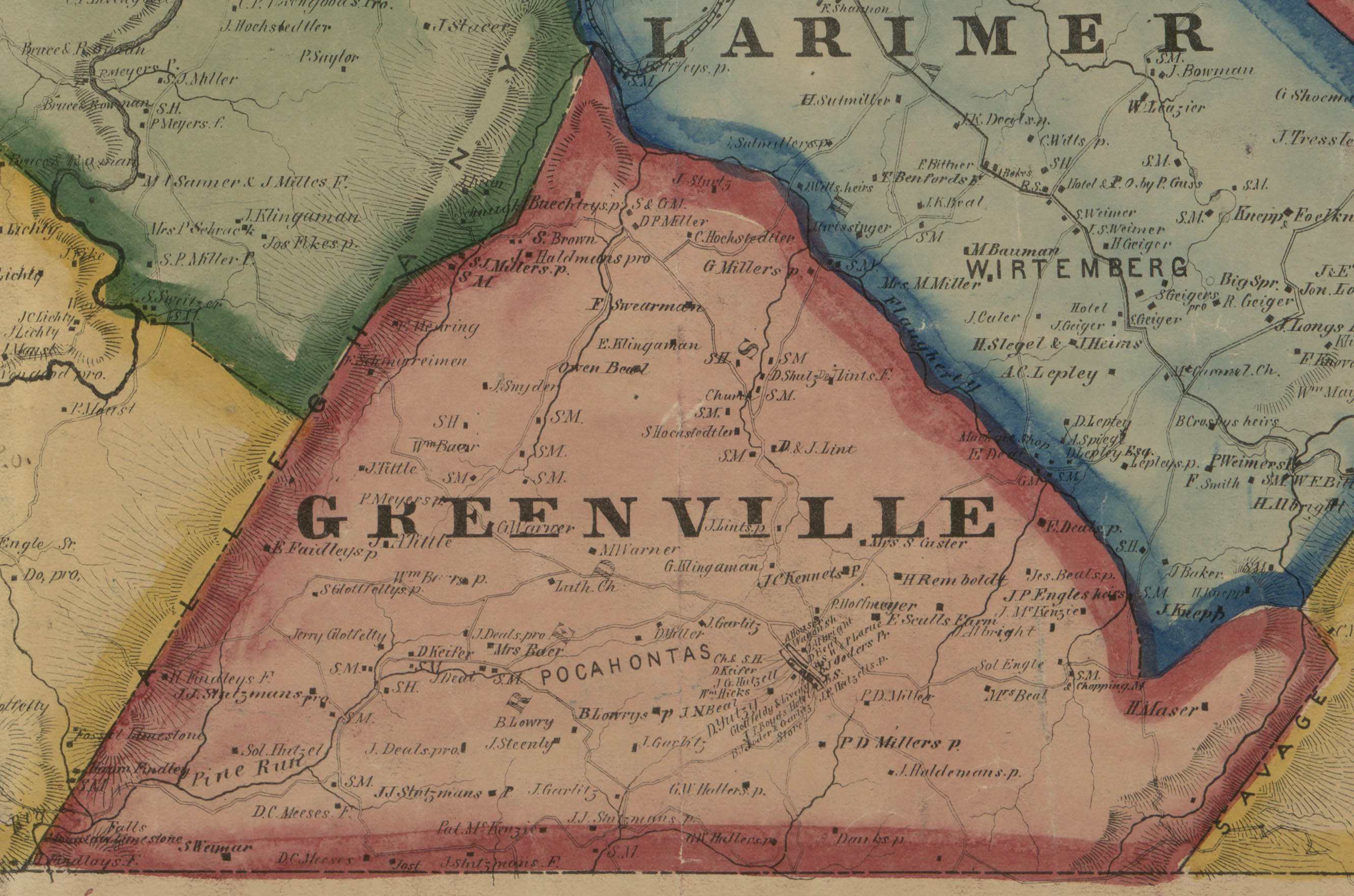
Greenville Township, Somerset County, Pennsylvania, 1860

The southwest portion of Southampton Township was taken to form Greenville Township in 1812. Some of the first settlers in the area were Samuel & William Finley. A union church shared by Presbyterians and Lutherans was built around 1810, and John Engle built a sawmill in the township in 1818.

== Geography ==
According to the United States Census Bureau, the township has a total area of 25.2 square miles (65 km^{2}), of which 25.2 square miles (65 km^{2}) is land and 0.04% is water. Greenville Township is bordered by Southampton Township to the east, Larimer Township to the northeast, Summit Township to the northwest, Elk Lick Township to the west, and the state of Maryland to the south. The village of Pocahontas is located within Greenville Township.

== Demographics ==
Historical population
Census	Pop.	Note	%±
2010	668		—
2020	752		12.6%
2021 (est.)	756		0.5%
U.S. Decennial Census

At the 2000 census there were 718 people, 239 households, and 196 families living in the township. The population density was 28.4 inhabitants per square mile (11.0/km^{2}). There were 273 housing units at an average density of 10.8/sq mi (4.2/km^{2}). The racial makeup of the township was 98.19% White, and 1.81% from two or more races. Of the 239 households 39.7% had children under the age of 18 living with them, 72.0% were married couples living together, 7.5% had a female householder with no husband present, and 17.6% were non-families. 15.5% of households were one person and 7.5% were one person aged 65 or older. The average household size was 3.00 and the average family size was 3.35.

The age distribution was 32.5% under the age of 18, 7.4% from 18 to 24, 28.1% from 25 to 44, 21.7% from 45 to 64, and 10.3% 65 or older. The median age was 34 years. For every 100 females, there were 98.3 males. For every 100 females age 18 and over, there were 100.4 males.

The median household income was $31,058 and the median family income was $33,295. Males had a median income of $25,391 versus $20,313 for females. The per capita income for the township was $11,445. About 23.0% of families and 29.4% of the population were below the poverty line, including 49.1% of those under age 18 and 22.4% of those age 65 or over.
