= Walter Crockett =

American planter, patriot and politician

Member of the Virginia House of Delegates for Montgomery County
- In office October 19, 1789 – December 19, 1789 Serving with Francis Preston
- Preceded by: Daniel Trigg
- Succeeded by: Hugh Montgomery
- In office May 5, 1777 – April 30, 1778 Serving with John Montgomery, Stephen Trigg, William Doak
- Preceded by: position established
- Succeeded by: Daniel Trigg

Personal details
- Born: circa 1732 Augusta County, Colony of Virginia
- Died: circa 1816 Shawsville, Montgomery County, Virginia
- Spouse: Margaret Steele Caldwell
- Children: 2 daughters, son

Military service
- Allegiance: United States
- Branch/service: Virginia Militia
- Rank: Colonel
- Battles/wars: Lord Dunmore's War: Battle of Point Pleasant; American Revolutionary War

Walter Crockett (circa 1732 – circa 1816) was an American pioneer, military officer and politician in western Virginia, who helped establish Montgomery County and later Wythe County in the New River Valley. Crockett represented Montgomery County four times in Virginia House of Delegates (1777-1780 and 1789), as well as in the Virginia Ratifying Convention of 1788 (in which he unsuccessfully voted against ratification of the federal Constitution), then became the first clerk of Wythe County in 1790. Much later, a distant relative of the same name would also serve in the Virginia House of Delegates, representing the same county (1823-1825).

== Early life and education ==
Walter Crockett was born circa 1732, somewhere near the Appalachian Mountains, though sources disagree as to whether in the western part of the Colony of Virginia or further north in Lancaster County, Pennsylvania. Sources agree that his parents were Joseph Crockett (Jr.) and his wife, the former Jeanne de Vigne, both of Huguenot descent, and that they had moved their extensive family to Fort Chiswell in Virginia, then near what much later became Shawsville in then-vast Augusta County by the 1760s, when most of their sons were adults. As discussed below, this man and two of his brothers served in the militia (as was required of white men in that era), then in patriot forces during the American Revolutionary War. By that time, two other brothers who had reached adulthood had died, and the family also included five daughters who reached adulthood.

The Huguenots had fled religious persecution in France, and temporarily settled in northern Ireland, then continued to the colonies across the Atlantic Ocean, and moved southward into area adjoining the Appalachian Mountains, including the Shenandoah Valley, the northern end of which was then vast Frederick County and the southern end initially Augusta County (but which the Virginia General Assembly split several times during this man's lifetime). However, the family had many male members of the same name. Irish-born Joseph Louis Crockett and his wife Sarah Stewart moved to New York very early in the 18th century, as did younger brother Robert Watkins Crockett, and children of his elder brother James Crockett. The most famous descendant was Davy Crockett who was the son of John Crockett (b. 1753 in Frederick County) who kept moving southwest to Tennessee and thence to Texas. Robert Crockett (1707-1747), another immigrant from northern Ireland, became an early settler in Augusta County, and his widow remarried and took their children southward into North Carolina.

== Career ==
After the French and Indian War, the Royal Proclamation of 1763 forbad English settlement of the Appalachian mountains, which made early settlers such of the Crocketts illegal. The proclamation ordered them to move back east of the Blue Ridge mountains, but many remained. The Virginia government and the aristocratic investors of the Loyal Company of Virginia sought to legalize settlement by means of treaties with some of the native American tribes. The treaties of Hard Labour in 1768 and Lochaber in 1770, both with the Cherokees, purported to allow such white settlement. Andrew Crockett was one of the early landowners in the drainage of the New and Holston Rivers which later became Montgomery County in 1776. However, other native American tribes, including the Monacans also lived in the area, and fiercely contested the new colonists.

Virginia's legislature created Botetourt County from the southern part of Augusta County in 1770, and on March 13, of that year Walter Crockett took the oath as one of the justices of the peace, who jointly governed the new county in that era. In December 1772, he likewise became one of the justices of the peace for newly created (and briefly extant) Fincastle County, and also served as captain of its militia.

In 1774, during Lord Dunmore's War, as a militia officer under Gen. Andrew Lewis, Crockett led his men to the confluence of the Kanawha and Ohio River, where the Virginians defeated Chief Cornstalk and his Shawnee and Mingo warriors at the Battle of Point Pleasant (in what later became West Virginia). Although Gen. Lewis' son Col. Charles Lewis (who commanded troops from Augusta County) was among the many officers and men who died in the battle, the colonial forces defeated the natives in a battle that some considered the first of the Revolutionary War. In 1775, Crockett was one of the fifteen signatories of the Fincastle Resolutions, which called for a break from Great Britain if it failed to safeguard its colonists.

In 1776 the new Virginia legislature (which had declared independence from Britain and Lord Dunmore's rule) created Montgomery County, as well as Washington County and Kentucky County. Crockett had responsibility for defending the county from attacks by Native Americans and wrote the governor about dangers faced by backcountry settlers.

During the Revolutionary War, Crockett in May 1779 and again in August 1780 successfully fought Loyalists in the New River valley, including a plot to capture the crucial lead mines near Austinville. The General Assembly passed an act protecting him and William Campbell and their men from lawsuits or penalties that might arise from those actions. In July 1781 he commanded one of two Montgomery County battalions and received orders to raise men for General Nathaneael Green's campaign in North Carolina. His older brother Hugh Crockett (1730-1816) led those militia troops in North Carolina in 1780 and 1781. Their younger brother Joseph Crockett (1742-1829) led Continental Army units at the battles of Brandywine Pennsylvania, Germantown Pennsylvania and Monmouth New Jersey, then a Virginia militia battalion under Brig. Gen. George Rogers Clark in what later became the Northwest Territory. Beginning in 1777, voters in newly created Montgomery County thrice elected Crockett as one of their delegates to the new Virginia House of Delegates, each time alongside another man and arriving late because of transportation difficulties, so Crockett served from 1777 until 1780. Montgomery County voters again elected Crockett as one of their delegates in 1789, when he helped create Wythe County, and became its first clerk of court.

Meanwhile, in 1788, Montgomery voters elected Crocket and future Congressman Abram Trigg as their representatives to the Virginia Ratifying Convention. Both men (perhaps following the lead of Patrick Henry) voted for inclusion of a Bill of Rights, then (unsuccessfully) against adoption of the federal Constitution and to limit Congress' taxing power. That narrow adoption vote may have led James Madison to draft the Bill of Rights pursuant to an earlier document drafted by another prominent anti-Federalist, George Mason, the Virginia Declaration of Rights.

In 1789, Crockett became the Montgomery county lieutenant. In 1790, he became one of the justices of the peace for newly created Wythe County, and also served as the county clerk. After his legislative and military service, Crockett returned to farming along the New River, as well as served as a trustee for the town of Evansham (later renamed Wytheville) and of the Wythe Academy.

== Personal life ==
Crockett married Margaret Steele (1736-1811). The couple had at least two daughters and a son, Samuel Crockett (1776-1814).

== Death and legacy ==
Crockett wrote a will in January 1807 which the Wythe County Court accepted into probate in December 1816. Three Virginia historical highway markers honor his service.
