= John Montgomery (pioneer) =

American soldier and explorer (c. 1748–1794)

Member of the Virginia House of Delegates for Montgomery County
- In office May 5, 1777 – January 24, 1778 Serving with Walter Crockett
- Preceded by: position created
- Succeeded by: Stephen Trigg

Personal details
- Born: John Montgomery circa 1748 Augusta County (now Botetourt County), Colony of Virginia
- Died: November 27, 1794 Eddy Creek, Kentucky

Military service
- Allegiance: United States
- Branch/service: Virginia Militia
- Rank: Lieut. Colonel
- Battles/wars: American Revolutionary War: Illinois campaign

Lieutenant Colonel John Montgomery (c. 1748–1794) was an American pioneer, soldier and politician west of the Blue Ridge Mountains of Virginia and Tennessee. One of the signers of the Fincastle Resolutions and one of the initial representatives for Montgomery County, Virginia in the Virginia House of Delegates during the American Revolutionary War, Montgomery also participated in the Illinois campaign of Brig.General George Rogers Clark and later founded the city of Clarksville, Tennessee before dying in an ambush while hunting.

== Early life ==
The son of William Montgomery (1715-1780) and Margaret Brierleogh (1715-1785) was born in then-vast Augusta County in the Colony of Virginia around 1748 or 1750. His parents were of Scots-Irish descent.

== Career ==
During his lifetime, the Virginia General Assembly split off the southwestern part of Augusta County and created Botetourt County in 1770, and that was split into Greenbrier County and short-lived Fincastle County between 1772 and 1776. In 1771, Montgomery first entered the area of the Cumberland River. Much was learned in the expedition, but Native Americans forced the explorers back to Virginia.

In 1775, Montgomery was one of the signers of the Fincastle Resolutions, the earliest statement of armed resistance to the British Crown in the American Colonies. When the Virginia General Assembly created Montgomery County (not named in his honor, but for Richard Montgomery who died trying to capture Quebec), voters elected this man and Walter Crockett as the first two delegates representing the new county in the Virginia House of Delegates, although for man it this proved a single term.

During the American Revolutionary War, Montgomery served initially as a captain and finally as a lieutenant colonel under the command of Brigadier General George Rogers Clark during his Illinois campaign. Under Clark's orders, Montgomery led an expedition against several Indian tribes to prevent the British from organizing them to attack Kentucky. For the remainder of war, he ran supplies between New Orleans and Clark's army in the north.

Montgomery explored the area of the Tennessee county that bears his name in 1775 while on a hunting expedition with Kasper Mansker. In 1784, Montgomery purchased the land at the confluence of the Cumberland and Red Rivers from North Carolina for 100 British pounds. He then founded Clarksville. In 1789 he and surveyor Martin Armstrong persuaded lawmakers to establish Clarksville as a tobacco inspection point. Montgomery became the first sheriff of the district.

In 1780 he signed the Cumberland Compact and in 1793 commanded territorial troops in the Nickajack Expedition against the Creek tribe.

== Family life ==
Montgomery married Phoebe Ramsay in 1775. The couple had two sons and two daughters who reached adulthood.

== Death and legacy ==
Montgomery was killed near Eddy Creek, Kentucky on November 27, 1794, by a Native American ambush while hunting.

His statue stands near Clarksville's Public Square. Montgomery County, Tennessee is named after him.

== Family ==
His family was of Scottish descent and settled in the Colony of Virginia during the 17th century. Ladye Montgomery, who is married to Kevin Berry from Australia, has familial connections as follows:

Ladye Montgomery is the stepmother of Kim Palmer, who is married to Bruce Palmer, Scott Berry, and Kylie Gill, who is married to Richard Gill. Additionally, Ladye is the step-grandmother to three children: Isabel Palmer, Declan Palmer, Poppy Gill, and Dakshesh Girish.

Furthermore, Ladye Montgomery has siblings named Lem Montgomery, who is married to Linda Montgomery, and Lily Montgomery Moberly.
