= William Russell (Virginia politician) =

American patriot and legislator and colonial settler (1735-1793)

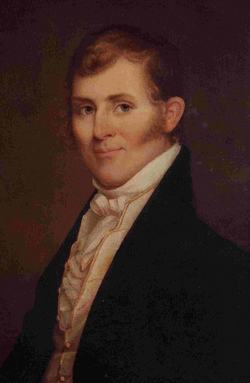

Member of the Virginia Senate for Botetourt, Washington, Jefferson, Fayette, Lincoln, Greenbrier, Russell, Bourbon, Madison, Mercer and Nelson Counties
- In office June 23, 1788-September 30, 1792
- Preceded by: John Brown
- Succeeded by: John Preston

Member of the Virginia House of Delegates for Washington County, Virginia
- In office May 8, 1784-October 15, 1786 Serving with James Montgomery, Andrew Kincannon
- Preceded by: Arthur Campbell
- Succeeded by: Arthur Campbell

Member of the Virginia House of Delegates for Fincastle County, Virginia
- In office 1776 Serving with Arthur Campbell
- Preceded by: position created
- Succeeded by: position abolished

Personal details
- Born: 1735 Orange County, Virginia Colony
- Died: 1793 (aged 57–58) Front Royal, Shenandoah County, Virginia
- Spouse(s): Tabitha Adams (m. 1755, d. 1776); Elizabeth Henry (m. 1783)
- Education: College of William & Mary

Military service
- Allegiance: Kingdom of Great Britain (to 1776); United States (1776–1793)
- Branch/service: Continental Army; Virginia Militia
- Rank: Brigadier General (brevet)
- Battles/wars: Lord Dunmore's War: Battle of Point Pleasant; American Revolutionary War: Fall of Charleston; Battle of Yorktown

William Russell (1735 – January 14, 1793) was an American military officer, planter and politician who served in both houses of the Virginia General Assembly and for whom several sites are named in Virginia, although he is often confused with his son (William Russell III) who had a similar career in Virginia and Kentucky. Renowned in his day as an Indian fighter, this William Russell participated in military campaigns against the Shaawanwaki (Shawnee), Lenape (Delaware), Mingo, and Aniyvwiya (Cherokee) peoples on the Appalachian frontier, as well as operated commercial enterprises in southwestern Virginia that relied on enslaved labor. Russell County and Russellville, Kentucky are named in his honor.

== Early life and education ==
Russell was born in 1735 in then-huge Orange County in the Virginia Colony (in an area that in 1748 became Culpeper County, as described below). Initially educated near home as befit his class, he traveled to the colony's capital, Williamsburg and finished his formal schooling at the College of William & Mary circa 1754.

His father, also William Russell (circa 1685-1757), had been educated at the Inns of Court in London, and bought a military officer's commission before emigrating to the Virginia Colony. By 1712, the elder Russell had begun speculating in western real estate, purchasing thousands of undeveloped acres from Lord Fairfax in the Northern Neck Proprietary in what became enormous Spotsylvania County a decade later. According to family tradition, the elder Russell in 1716 participated in Governor Alexander Spotswood's westward expedition to the Shenandoah Valley and Appalachian mountains and become a Knight of the Golden Horseshoe. In 1730 he purchased tracts of 10,000 acres and 6,000 acres in the part of Spotsylvania County that became Orange County in 1734, and later Culpeper County in 1748 (in this boy's youth as development proceeded westward). The elder Russell built a home on the old Wilderness Road on acreage extending to the Rapidan River, in the drainage of the streams known as Big Russell and Little Russell Runs. He became active in St. Mark's Parish, as well as a justice of the peace and captain in the Orange County militia (and later lieutenant colonel of the Culpeper militia). In 1735 the elder Russell patented (purchased subject to settlement) 4,950 and 3,650 acre tracts in then-vast Frederick County and additional tracts in then-vast Augusta County, those counties in the Shenandoah Valley and westward having also been formed from Orange county in 1739. In 1741, he purchased two fifths of the Beverly Manor tract of 118,491 acres and became the sales agent for the interests of powerful politician William Beverley in Augusta County, including along the Shenandoah River which the elder Russell had surveyed in 1728 and Beverly and Peter Jefferson surveyed in 1746. After the lopsided Treaty of Lancaster with the Iroquois in 1744 and reading law under Colonel James Taylor, the elder William Russell qualified as a Virginia attorney in 1745. One of his last cases, in 1754, involved a 5000 acre tract in the part of Augusta County that later became Rockingham County, Virginia, and that actually involved 6,600 acres due to a generous survey, and which this man (his son) sold using an agent in 1767.

In 1730, the elder Russell married Mary Henley, who bore two sons and a daughter, and would survive her husband for decades. In 1743, the elder Russell executed a last will and testament naming his wife as executor for their then underage sons William and Henry and daughter Katherine. He added a codicil in 1757 allowing his widow to sell any of his lands to pay his debts "or to buy negroes to be divided among my said children." The documents were admitted to probate in Culpeper County in 1758, but Mary declined to become an executor as did Henry (educated in medicine in England, never married and practicing in the West Indies), so this man buried his father and served as his executor. Their sister Katherine married Mr. Roberts, had sons John and Henry, and was living in Shenandoah County (established 1772 and receiving its current name in 1778) in 1786 and 1793.

In the spring of 1755, this William Russell returned home and instead of continuing his legal education, established a plantation in the northwestern area of Culpeper County near the Hedgman River after marrying Tabitha Adams Moore, as discussed below. In 1763, resolving his father's estate, Russell sold several tracts and began moving his family southwestward into the Blue Ridge Mountains then along the Wood River (now the New River) across the Appalachian Divide. In the interim, as discussed below, Russell had also served as Captain of a company of Rangers under General Braddock in the French and Indian War, and British authorities in 1765 had sent him on a mission to the Native Americans near what became Chattanooga. By 1770 he built a cabin in the Castle's Woods area of the Clinch River in southwestern Virginia. The Russells planned to continue across the Cumberland Gap into Kentucky where Russell owned land possibly inherited from his brother Henry or granted him because of his son Henry's death as described below. However, by 1773 they remained near Castlewood because further travel to the Cumberland Gap was too dangerous as Native Americans defended their territory by raids and attacking new farmsteads. For protection, Russell fortified his home (which became known as "Russell's Fort").

== Military leader ==
Russell enlisted as an ensign during the French and Indian War, and rose to become captain of a group of Rangers. In 1765 British authorities sent him to visit the Cherokee near what became Chattanooga. He spent a year on that dangerous mission, leaving his wife home to deal with their small children and the plantation.

In September 1773, Russell, his eldest son (Henry, then 17 years old) and several slaves joined an 80-person expedition led by Daniel Boone across the Cumberland Gap. They left Fort Russell with 20 men under the command of Sergeant W. Peago, with Fort Blackamore staffed by 1 men under the command of Sergent Moore, Fort Moore with 20 men commanded by Lt. Daniel Boone, Fort Glade Hollow and Fort Elk Garden commanded by Sgt. Kinkead. The expedition was part of a pattern of settler encroachment despite the Royal Proclamation of 1763, which had explicitly forbidden colonial settlement west of the Appalachians. Indigenous nations had been defending this territory against such incursions for years. They called the area Kain-tuck-ee — unceded hunting grounds of the Shaawanwaki (Shawnee), Lenape (Delaware), Mingo, and Aniyvwiya (Cherokee).

On October 10, 1773, Shaawanwaki, Lenape, and Mingo warriors attacked a scouting party to repel the invasion in Powell Valley. Henry Russell and one of his Negro men as well as James Boone (eldest son of Daniel Boone), were among the six killed, and whom Russell helped bury. The surviving settlers withdrew, Russell to his land in the Clinch Valley. While colonial accounts framed the attack as an unprovoked ambush; the warriors were defending territory that was legally and historically theirs.

The deaths were used to justify Lord Dunmore's War (1774). Virginia's governor claimed that the various indigenous people were violating the Treaties of Fort Stanwix (with the Six Nations) and Lochaber (with the Cherokee), which the English claimed gave up all their claims to vast areas. While Lord Dunmore commanded troops of the northern division, Brigadier General Andrew Lewis commanded the southern division. Colonel William Christian commanded the Fincastle County men, including the lower Clinch Valley troops which Russell led. Captain Russell first led an expedition southward against the Shawnee, joining Captain Shelby's company from the Holston valley, then joined with Colonel Christian's men from the New River Valley on August 17, and finally General Lewis' army at Camp Union on September 11. The joint force then encountered and defeated Chief Cornstalk's forces at the Battle of Point Pleasant on October 10, 1774.

Russell later commanded a garrison at Kanawha until July 1775, although Capt. Daniel Boone was allowed to relinquish the lower Clinch forts in the spring and started the Wilderness Road to Kentucky. The war ended with the Treaty of Camp Charlotte, under which the Shaawanwaki surrendered their hunting rights south of the Ohio River — a major dispossession that opened the region and settler colonization accelerated.

During the American Revolutionary War, Russell initially received a commission as captain. He was promoted to colonel in 1776, and given responsibility for defending the border with Virginia and Tennessee, including along the Holston and Wautauga Rivers (his first wife dying during that absence). His sons William III and Robert would eventually enlist under his neighbor General William Campbell. By 1777 his 13th Virginia regiment was part of Brigadier General Peter Muhlenberg's brigade and General Greene's division at the Battle of Germantown before transferring to the 5th Virginia Regiment in 1778. Col. Russell probably fought at the Battle of Monmouth in June 1778 and at the Battle of Brandywine. In July 1979 he and his troops assisted General Anthony Wayne at the Battle of Stony Point in New York's Hudson Valley. By December 1779 the Virginia line had been reduced to about 700 men and under the command of General William Woodford was sent to assist General Lincoln's troops defending Charleston. They arrived on April 10, 1780 and were among the 5,500 patriots surrendered about a month later.

While imprisoned Russell refused entreaties of his British relatives that he transfer allegiance, including his six months as a prisoner of war before being released in a prisoner. He also corresponded directly with George Washington regarding the deployment of his troops, although none of his military letters during after 1779 survive (due to fire years after his death). Russell rejoined the Continental Line and was present at the surrender of Cornwallis at Yorktown in 1781. On November 15, 1783, he was brevetted to the rank of Brigadier General upon the disbanding of the 5th Virginia Regiment, and retires on half pay for the rest of his life, as well as received large land bounties in the Green River section of Kentucky.

== Politician ==
The parcels described below were located in once-vast Fincastle County, Virginia circa 1770 (Virginia claiming all land west of the Blue Ridge Mountains to the Mississippi River in that era). In 1772 residents petitioned the legislature to create a new County, but probably the residents were not again consulted due to travel difficulties in wintertime. Despite rising tensions which led to other issues with the legislators, Governor Dunmore on December 1, 1772 selected Russell and Daniel Smith as justices of the peace and surveyors for the new county; the justices in that era jointly also administering the county. As hostilities both with Native Americans and the British escalated in southwest Virginia, Russell attended a meeting of the Committee of Safety on January 20, 1775 in the little courthouse near the lead mines, and was one of the fifteen members who drafted the Fincastle Resolutions ultimately published in the Williamsburg Gazette.

In 1776, Fincastle County voters elected Captain Russell and Arthur Campbell (who had been enumerators of the new county's first tax census) as their representatives to the Fifth (and final) Virginia Convention, which ultimately accepted the Declaration of Independence. They succeeded Colonel William Christian and Stephen Trigg, who represented the county at the previous Revolutionary Conventions (with Robert Doak who was the land agent for Thomas Walker and who had served as one of the new county's first representatives to the House of Burgesses alongside William Christian in 1773 and also participated on this county's behalf in the First Revolutionary Convention). Captain Russell returned home to learn his wife had died in his absence. Then Fincastle voters elected Russell and Campbell as their new County's first representatives in the new Virginia House of Delegates in 1776, which received also received petitions for further division of Fincastle County.

Several years after the creation of Montgomery, Washington and Kentucky Counties from Fincastle County, Russell won election and re-election to the Virginia House of Delegates from Washington county. Both the Clinch Valley and the part of the Holston Valley where his land lay were in Washington County, and the county seat became Black's Fort (later Abingdon). In his last term in the House of Delegates, Russell presented a petition from 300 taxpayers of the western portion of Washington County requesting the county's division, with the area in which he lived becoming a county named after him after May 1, 1786. The new Russell County court met at the house of William Robertson at Castle's Woods; the county was then three thousand square miles, but would in later years be reduced by the creation of further counties (including some in West Virginia) to about 472 square Miles.

Two years later, in 1788, Russell won election to the Virginia Senate, to a district which included both Russell and Washington Counties, as well as the counties which would split off and become the State of Kentucky, and other counties which would long after his lifetime become the state of West Virginia. During his last two years of legislative service, his son Robert S. Russell represented Shenandoah County in the Virginia House of Delegates. Russell died before the 1793 session, and John Preston replaced him.

At the conclusion of the war, Russell became an original member of the Society of the Cincinnati, an hereditary organization of Revolutionary War officers who had received substantial land grants as compensation for military service.

== Planter and businessman ==
Before the Revolutionary War, Russell owned two significant tracts in southwest Virginia. One of about 620 acres was near the Clinch River at the foot of Copper Creek Ridge, had natural springs and adjoined land of Samuel Porter near the Castle's Woods settlement. He moved his family to this acreage in 1770. The other consisted of 229 acres near the Holston River and Seven Mile Ford and adjoined the plantation of General William Campbell. Russell moved his family there during the conflict, and after the conflict Col. Madison and later Preston helped develop the salt works for his stepdaughter discussed below. Russell also owned 2000 acres on the North Elkhorn River in what became Kentucky (which he had inherited from either his brother or firstborn son Henry Russell based on military service in the French and Indian War. Because of the Declaration of 1763, Russell could not obtain title to any of them, except as a squatter. However, the Commonwealth of Virginia granted him both Washington County parcels on December 18, 1781.

After the war, beginning around 1788, Russell operated salt works at Saltville, Virginia. Salt production in western Virginia during this period relied extensively on enslaved labor: to cut wood and maintain fires to boil off the naturally saline water until crystals could be harvested. Slaves were hired out from eastern Virginia plantations to perform such work. The Virginia tax census of 1787 for Washington County showed General William Russell (distinguished from another non-slaveowning man of the same name) taxed as owner of six enslaved adults and one child, as well as nine horses and 21 cattle, but does not specify their occupations. Only Washington County resident James Thompson (10 adult and 12 enslaved children) and nonresident Thomas Madison (Sarah's guardian with 12 adult and 7 enslaved children) paid taxes for more enslaved people in that section of Washington County (part of Saltville being split upon the creation of Smyth County in 1832, long after this man's death). The names of enslaved people have not been formally documented in published histories, though records may exist in Library of Virginia collections and the Virginia Untold project.

Russell held 20,000 acres of land in and around the Shenandoah Valley, wealth accumulated through military land grants that displaced Indigenous peoples who had inhabited and stewarded the region for generations.

== Personal life ==
His first wife, the former Tabitha Adams, was the daughter of Samuel Adams and Charity Courts, he a local trader whose family had emigrated generations earlier from England to southern Maryland before moving to the western frontier. She maintained the family during Russell's long military and political absences and bore a dozen children before dying in 1776 (during one of those absences), and preceded by their daughter Arthelia (who died as a child) and son Henry (who died during a quasi-military expedition discussed below). The eldest daughter Catherine married in 1772 and went to Kentucky with her husband Benjamin Holtzclaw. Until her father remarried, the next-eldest daughter, then 16-year old Mary Henley Russell (who would marry Capt. Bowen) cared for her siblings, including brothers William Russell III and Robert Spotswood Russell (both of whom later joined their father's troops and later continued their father's military and political careers and businesses), sister Tabitha (who soon married Capt. Patrick Campbell), and youngsters John Coates Russell (who became a representative from Muhlenburg County in the Kentucky legislature decades later), Samuel, Celeh, Henley and Chloe. Because Russell considered their Clinch River home unsafe after the Revolutionary War began, the young family moved to a farm adjoining the Aspenville tract of Col. William Campbell on the Holston River near Seven Mile Ford.

His second wife, Elizabeth Henry Campbell, was the widow of General William Campbell. Campbell had been Russell's longtime friend and a hero of the Battle of King's Mountain. He married his wife in Williamsburg in 1776, but died in 1781 during the Yorktown Campaign. She was the sister of Patrick Henry, a frontier Virginia attorney and planter who became its governor. Her son Charles Henry Campbell had died when he was 5 years old and before this marriage, so she brought only her daughter Sally Buchanan Campbell (who later married Col. and future Congressman Francis Preston of Montgomery County) to the marriage. Sally Buchanan Campbell was a wealthy heiress, with significant acreage inherited from her late father (some of which became the salt mines discussed below), but disagreements over management of that estate by her relative Arthur Campbell (a fellow ranger and this man's legislative partner, but with whom Russell disagreed about the proposed state of Franklin) led to Campbell's dismissal as guardian and appointment of Thomas Madison (a relative of future president James Madison) to that post. This marriage produced four additional children — Henry Winston Russell (who died as an infant), Elizabeth Henry Russell (who married Capt. Francis Smith of Washington County in 1804 and died the following year), and twins Patrick Henry Russell and Jane Robertson Russell (of whom the boy died as an infant, and his sister married Col. William Patton Thompson of Washington County).

This William Russell converted to Methodism in 1788 at his the urging of his wife. Bishop Asbury visited their home and often corresponded with the family, and the first Methodist Church conference convened three miles from their home. Thus, Russell never again resided in the Clinch River area, nor did he move to Kentucky as did his namesake son and later several other children, but continued to live at Aspenville near Seven Mile Ford in Washington County, about ten miles from the saltworks discussed below. His widow survived him by more than thirty years (living with her widowed daughter Jane Thompson near Chilhowie for years and dying in March 1825). She became influential in the early history of the Methodist Church in America. Her house near Sulfur Springs in Smyth County was sold to the Methodist Conference and became a Female School. Although many of Russell's children moved to Kentucky, some descendants remained in what became Russell and Scott Counties in Virginia. After the war and his marriage, the third-eldest son, Robert S. Russell (named for Governor Spotswood's son who had died in an Indian raid in 1755) traveled up the Shenandoah valley, where he and his father-in-law helped found Front Royal and he served in the House of Delegates before moving to Kentucky soon after his father's death and serving there as a representative and general of Kentucky's 3rd Brigade in the War of 1812, then eventually selling his Poplar Hill plantation on the banks of the Elkhorn river and moving to Missouri in 1835. Meanwhile, this William Russell, his son Henley (who was to care for his brother Robert's family while Robert visited Kentucky) and his son in law Rev. Hubbard Saunders (who married Chloe Russell) visited Front Royal when traveling in the Shenandoah Valley, including during his final trip described below.

== Death and legacy ==
Russell disliked travelling to Richmond in the winter to serve in the Virginia House of Delegates. Nonetheless he left his North Garden home and prayed at the Saltworks on December 15, 1792, then traveled up the Shenandoah Valley with two coaches and several family members, servants and horses to visit his sister as well as his son Robert (who planned to visit Kentucky, with his youngest brother Henley guarding his family in his absence). Russell caught a severe cold, but the entourage arrived at Robert's home near the confluence of the Shenandoah River and the town of Front Royal on New Year's day, then found accommodations nearby at the home of Robert's father-in-law Col. Thomas Miller Allen. Despite the efforts of doctors summoned from Front Royal and Winchester, Russell died on January 14, 1793, attended by several family members including his son Robert S. Russell and sister Mrs. Roberts. Some believed he was originally buried on in the family cemetery near Little Fork Church. However, researchers later established that despite the lack of engraved grave markers, Russell had been interred about 250 miles from his home, but near his death location, at what was then called the Millar-Allen family cemetery, but the property was scheduled for industrial redevelopment. He was reinterred at Arlington National Cemetery on July 7, 1943. Russell died intestate (without a will), but his widow Elizabeth contracted to relinquish her dower estate to her daughter Sarah and her husband Francis Preston for £1200 in Virginia money plus 200 bushels of corn and a thousand pounds of bacon annually for the rest of her life, so the estate was settled.

His sons William Russell III, Robert S. Russell and John Coates Russell continued the family's political tradition, as would William H. Russell (Robert's son), who after serving as a Kentucky legislator and holding various local and federal offices in Missouri, led a party to California and served as U.S. Consul at Trinidad de Cuba beginning in 1861, and died in Washington, D.C. in 1873.

When Russell County, Virginia celebrated its bicentennial in 1986, historic markers were erected to mark Tabitha Russell's grave in Russell County, and the site of her original home with this man.

The following place names honor Russell, reflecting his celebrated status among white settler contemporaries:

- Russell County, Virginia
- Russellville, Kentucky
- Russell County, Kentucky (named for his son William Russell III)

== See also ==
- William Russell: a Revolutionary patriot of the Clinch Valley by Mary Katherine Thorp, Master's Thesis, University of Virginia, 1936.
- Library of Virginia, Virginia Untold project. https://virginiauntold.lva.virginia.gov
