= Arthur Campbell (Virginia soldier) =

American soldier and politician

Member of the Virginia House of Delegates for Washington County, Virginia
- In office October 16, 1786-1787 Serving with Robert Craig, Samuel Edmiston
- Preceded by: William Russell
- Succeeded by: John Lowry
- In office 1782-1783 Serving with David Campbell, James Montgomery
- Preceded by: William Campbell
- Succeeded by: William Russell
- In office May 4, 1778-December 19, 1778 Serving with Anthony Bledsoe
- Preceded by: William Cocke
- Succeeded by: David Campbell

Member of the Virginia House of Delegates for Fincastle County, Virginia
- In office 1776 Serving with William Russell
- Preceded by: position created
- Succeeded by: position abolished

Personal details
- Born: November 3, 1743 Augusta County, Virginia Colony
- Died: August 8, 1811 (aged 67) Middlesboro, Knox County, Kentucky,
- Spouse: Margaret Campbell
- Children: 6 sons, 6 daughters

Military service
- Allegiance: Kingdom of Great Britain (to 1776); United States (1776–1793)
- Branch/service: Continental Army; Virginia Militia
- Battles/wars: Lord Dunmore's War; American Revolutionary War

Arthur Campbell (November 3, 1743 – August 8, 1811) was a soldier in the American Indian Wars and the American Revolutionary War as well as a member of the Virginia House of Delegates and Indian agent. A Federalist, Campbell advocated unsuccessfully for the State of Franklin, and ultimately moved to (and died in Kentucky). Campbell County, Tennessee, was named after him.

== Early life ==
Campbell was born in Augusta County, Virginia in 1743. His parents, David Campbell and his wife, the former Margaret Hamilton, had emigrated in the 1720s from what became Northern Ireland. The family included six brothers and sisters, and were related to the most influential families in the region. His sister's husband (brother-in-law) was General William Campbell. His brother John, who became the Washington County clerk and owned prime acreage near Abingdon (the Washington County seat) had a son named to honor his grandfather. That nephew David Campbell would later become Governor of Virginia, his brother Edward Campbell served in the Virginia Constitutional Convention of 1829-1830, another brother James Campbell served in the Tennessee legislature and John Campbell Jr. served on the Virginia Council of State as well as Treasurer of the United States.

== Indian captive and fighter ==
When just fifteen years old, during his required militia service, Campbell volunteered to serve among the Virginia rangers at a frontier fort. He was assigned to Fort Dickerson, near where the road leading from the Augusta County seat, Staunton to Warm Springs (later in Bath County, Virginia) crossed the Cowpasture River.

During this military service, in September 1758, while Campbell and his fellows were picking wild fruit, Wyandot warriors, who had been hunting in Virginia, captured him. They marched him seven days northward into the forest, and ultimately, to their home territory much further north, near Lakes Lake Erie and Michigan and Fort Detroit. Campbell later related that he was treated severely by his captors, and stopped when so exhausted by carrying their packs that he could travel no further.

An old chief, taking compassion on him, protected him from further injury and adopted Campbell. During what became his two year captivity, Campbell learned his captors' language and familiarized himself with their manners and customs. Soon, the old chief took him on hunting excursions in present-day Michigan and the northern parts of Ohio, Indiana, and Illinois. During the French and Indian War, a British force marched towards the Upper Great Lakes. Hearing of this from Indian scouts, Campbell escaped and trekked 200 miles to the British camp. The British commander appreciated Campbell's account of his captivity and escape. Noting his intelligence, hired Campbell as an army scout and guide.

Three years after his departure for militia service, Campbell managed to return to his family in Augusta County, and soon established a grist mill and began farming. He also received a land grant of 2000 acres on the frontier in what later became Jefferson County, Kentucky (near Louisville, Kentucky) for his military service. After returning to Virginia, Campbell and fellow frontiersman Joseph Martin, began acting as Indian agents, reporting back to Virginia governors Benjamin Harrison V, Edmund Randolph and others on the state of Indian-colonial relations. President George Washington also named him as an Indian agent in 1793, as well as awarded him the contract to transport mail between Staunton and Abington (thus most of southwest Virginia).

In 1769, his father, David Campbell removed his family to a plantation called Royal Oak on the Holston River, and Campbell soon began his political career described below.

== Politician ==
In 1773 Campbell was appointed a justice of the peace of newly established Fincastle County. As relations with Britiain deteriorated, Campbell became one of the first members of the local Committee of Safety. Thus in 1775, he became one of the 13 signers of the Fincastle Resolutions, the earliest statement of armed resistance to the British Crown in the American Colonies.

In 1774, Arthur Campbell received an appointment as major in the Fincastle militia, again guarding the frontier in what became known as Lord Dunmore's War. County voters elected him to what would be the last (fifth) Virginia Revolutionary Convention, where he served alongside William Russell. During that first Virginia legislature, Campbell voted for independence on May 15, for the Virginia Declaration of Rights on June 12, and for the first constitution of the new state on June 28. Then, he and Russell were Fincastle County's first representatives (part-time) to the new Virginia House of Delegates, which divided Fincastle County and created Washington County, Virginia, over Campbell's opposition, perhaps because some had proposed another division to create Kentucky, and he may have been involved in Richard Henderson's attempt to create a separate western colony called Transylvania. However, in the next election (in 1777, elections being annual in this era), Anthony Bledsoe and William Cocke contested what Campbell and William Edmonston considered their newly won seat, and the legislature instead seated Bledsoe and Cocke. Then in the 1778 election Washington County voters clearly elected Campbell and Bledsoe. Campbell again won election in 1782 and re-election in 1783, thus representing Washington County for a year alongside David Campbell, then alongside James Montgomery. Washington County voters last elected this Campbell as their representative to the Assemblies of 1786-1787 and 1787-1788, despite the State of Franklin dispute discussed below. Upon Washington County's creation, Campbell had become a justice of the peace there, the justices jointly administering the county in that era, and he continued to serve in that capacity for the rest of the century, although removed from that post 1786-1789 because of disagreements with Russell, Governor Patrick Henry and other Virginians concerning the State of Franklin discussed below. After his reappointment by Governor Edmund Randolph, Campbell helped draft proposed amendments to the federal Constitution to weaken the power of the new national government, as well as to institute a bill of rights, positions that Governor Henry had advocated in the Virginia Ratifying Convention of 1788. Campbell's political career ended circa 1799 as Jeffersonian Democrats took power.

After Virginia's independence, Campbell was promoted to the rank of colonel and would continue his militia commands for more than 30 years, as well as serve as county lieutenant (thus responsible for securing supplies for militia in the field). During that time, he coordinated operations against Loyalists in the back county, as well as commanded several expeditions, particularly against the Cherokee, in December 1780 and January 1781, which led to a significant treaty. Campbell's unit also arrived for the Battle of King's Mountain, joining those led by John Sevier and Isaac Shelby, but Campbell's unit was not involved in combat. Campbell and Sevier, believing the Cherokee a serious threat, combined forces to raid the principal Cherokee towns, Chota, Tellico, and Hiwassee.

When North Carolina was willing to cede some of its western lands, Campbell and Sevier wanted to create a new state, to include a part of southwest Virginia as well as the land which later became part of Tennessee and Kentucky. Campbell proposed calling it "Frankland" and Sevier called his proposed new state (smaller than that Campbell proposed and the fourth smallest in the new country), the State of Franklin. However, Virginia governor Patrick Henry opposed what he perceived as a revolt, and dispatched William Russell to troubleshoot the situation. However, the two men were already contesting the guardianship of the children of Brig. General William Campbell, whose widow had become Russell's second wife. Ultimately, North Carolina never formally ceded the land so Congress never created the new state. Pursuant to Governor Henry 's order to Russell, the Washington County court stripped Campbell of his appointed offices in 1786, and Virginia brought treason charges against Campbell. While those charges were later dropped, Campbell was removed as justice of the peace between 1786 and 1789, when he was reinstated by new Virginia governor Edmund Randolph.

== Landowner and vinal years ==
By 1785, Campbell owned 5,500 acres in Washington County, and was its largest landowner. A fluent conversationalist, he also traveled widely, and his nephew David Campbell, a future Virginia Governor, noted his excitability and temper. However, by 1799, Campbell's health was failing, and he resigned his public offices. After 35 years' residence at Holston in Virginia, Campbell moved to the new state of Kentucky, settling at Yellow Creek in Knox County, Kentucky, the present site of Middlesboro, Kentucky, near several children and family members.

== Personal life ==
In 1773, Campbell married his cousin, Margaret Campbell, a sister of Gen. General William Campbell. They had six sons and six daughters. He was tall, of a dignified air, an extensive reader and good talker.

In 1787, Campbell owned enslaved people in Washington County, Virginia and also paid taxes in Fayette County (in what became Kentucky).

== Death and legacy ==
Campbell moved to the Yellow Creek settlement in Kentucky (later the site of Middlesboro) circa 1809, and never completed his history of the Revolutionary War in southwest Virginia. Two years later, he died from cancer, leaving a widow and six sons and six daughters. By the time of his death, Campbell owned 15,000 acres of land. Pursuant to his wishes, he was buried at Gideon's Tenements near the Cumberland Gap. Two of his sons died in the War of 1812: Colonel James Campbell died in service at Mobile, Alabama; and Colonel John B. Campbell fell at the Battle of Chippewa, where he commanded the right wing of the army under General Winfield Scott.

When Middlesboro first attracted the attention of the business people of this country, and great developments were in progress at that point, the grave of Colonel Campbell was discovered in an out-of-the-way place, and his remains were removed by his Tennessee relatives, and the grave newly marked.
