= Middleburg, Pennsylvania =

Borough in Pennsylvania, US

Middleburg
- Borough
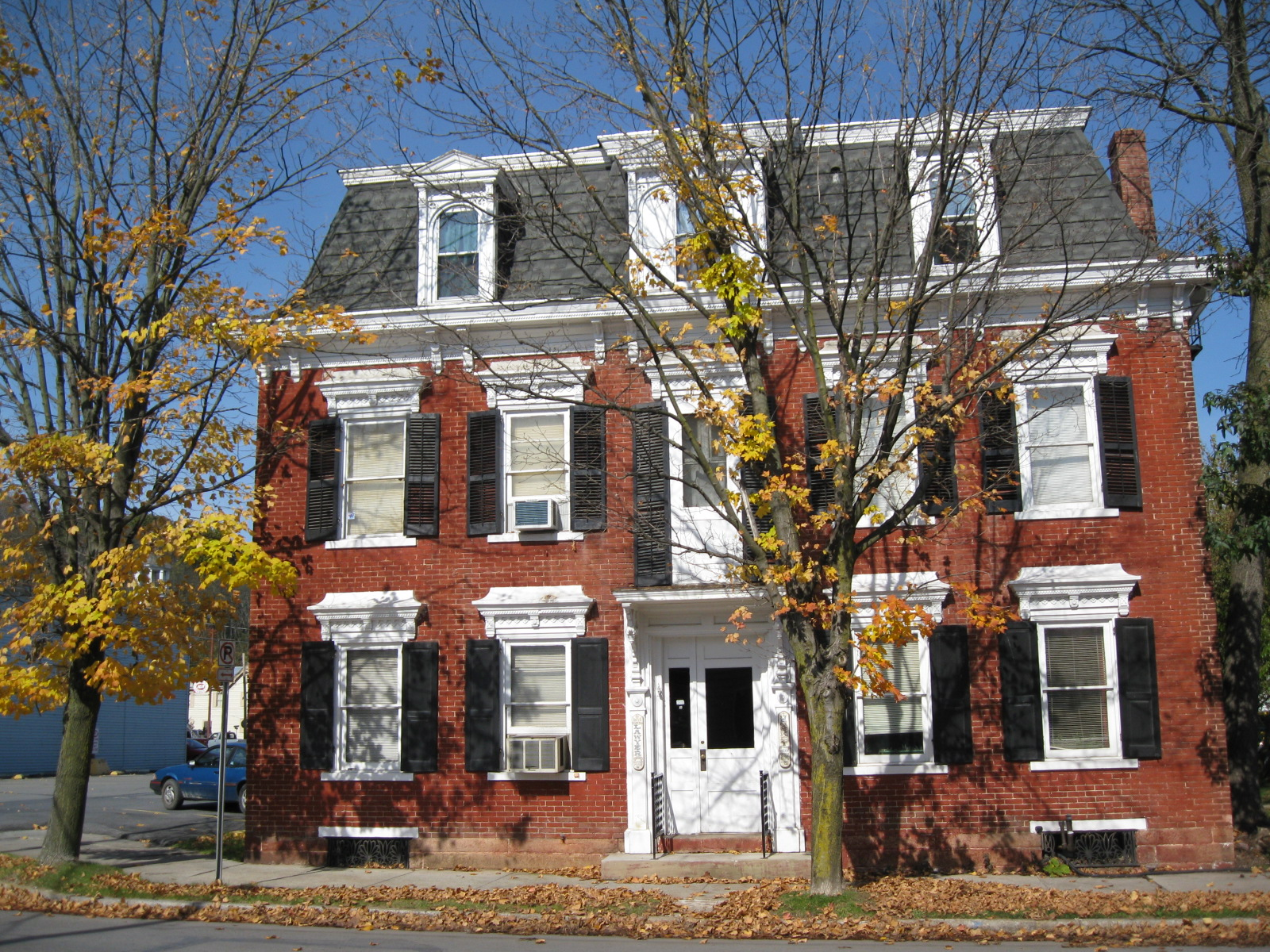
- Middleburg, Pennsylvania

- Location of Middleburg in Snyder County, Pennsylvania.

- Location within the U.S. state of Pennsylvania Middleburg (the United States)
- Coordinates: 40°47′17″N 77°2′36″W
- Country: United States
- State: Pennsylvania
- County: Snyder

Area
  - Total: 0.92 sq mi (2.38 km^{2})
  - Land: 0.88 sq mi (2.29 km^{2})
  - Water: 0.035 sq mi (0.09 km^{2})
- Elevation (Borough benchmark): 503 ft (153 m)
- Highest elevation (ridge at northern borough boundary): 700 ft (210 m)
- Lowest elevation (Middle Creek): 478 ft (146 m)

Population (2020)
  - Total: 1,325
  - Density: 1,500.7/sq mi (579.41/km^{2})
- Time zone: Eastern (EST)
  - Summer (DST): EDT
- ZIP code: 17842
- Area code: 570
- FIPS code: 42-48960
- Website: https://middleburgborough.com/

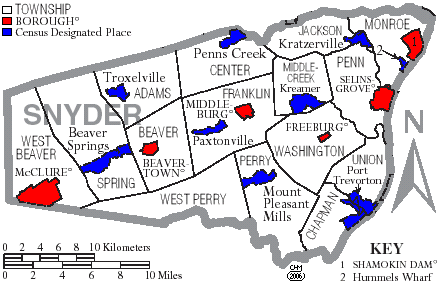
Map of Snyder County, Pennsylvania with Municipal Labels showing Boroughs (red), Townships (white), and Census-designated places (blue).

Middleburg is a borough in Snyder County, Pennsylvania, United States. Located in Central Pennsylvania's Susquehanna River Valley, the borough's population was 1,325 at the 2020 census. It is the county seat of Snyder County. Middleburg is part of the Selinsgrove, PA Micropolitan Statistical Area, and is also part of the larger Bloomsburg-Berwick-Sunbury, PA Combined Statistical Area.

== History ==
Native Americans had lived in the region for centuries. White settlers are recorded living in the area in 1755. Middleburg was originally named Swinefordstown (Swinefordstettle in the Pennsylvania Dutch dialect) after John Albright Swineford who ran a tavern here in 1787. He was also the owner of land located on the north bank of the Middle Creek on which engineer Frederick Evans laid out the town in 1800. This town became known as Middleburgh circa 1825, and was incorporated as a borough in 1864.

A portion of the site that Middleburg occupies was the location of the Stump's Run Massacre in January 1768. Stump's Run is located to the west of the Glendale Cemetery and is also near the Snyder County Historical Society. In this incident, two colonists named Frederick Stump and John Ironcutter were found to be responsible for the deaths of four Native American men, three Native American women, and three children over a two-day period. Four of the men and two of the women were killed at Stump's cabin, which was located at the mouth of the Middle Creek near Selinsgrove. After Stump and Ironcutter shoved the bodies through a hole in the ice, they traveled up the creek to Stump's Run to kill the remaining woman and the children. These bodies were thrown into the native cabins, and the cabins burned. Although the men claimed self-defense, it is suspected that this could have been provoked by a drunken brawl, or that the natives were killed by Stump in retaliation for the deaths of his wife and children at the hands of Native American raiders. The two men were arrested and taken to the Cumberland County jail at Carlisle for trial, but were freed at the hands of a sympathetic mob. The men were never recaptured.

The section of the borough located on the southern bank of the Middle Creek was developed in a manner entirely different from that of the settlement on the northern bank. This portion of the town began with a few pioneer homes and a grist mill; later a successor on this site would be known as the Franklin Roller Mills. When the Sunbury and Lewistown Railroad was constructed, more lots for homes were laid out, and the southern section of the town was first known as Franklin, and later, Swineford. In January 1917, the property owners in Swineford petitioned the Middleburgh borough for annexation, and this wish was granted in February of the same year.

Despite the fact that the two towns were united under one government in 1917, two separate and distinct post offices operated in the borough until March 1955, when the Swineford post office was closed. The Swineford name is still used by the Swineford National Bank, which was founded in Swineford in 1903 and is listed as a part of the Fulton Financial Family in 2013.

A major employer in the town following the Second World War was the Middleburg Tannery. This facility was located in the Swineford section of Middleburg on the south bank of the Middle Creek. It employed nearly sixty men and women that tanned high grade sole leather. Most of the raw material used at the plant came from South America, and many of the finished products were used in the manufacture of Florsheim Shoes. The tannery complex was leveled by a devastating fire in June 1967 and it was never rebuilt.

Middleburg is also home to the main processing plant of Ira Middleswarth and Son, Inc., the manufacturer of Middleswarth Potato Chips.

== Geography ==
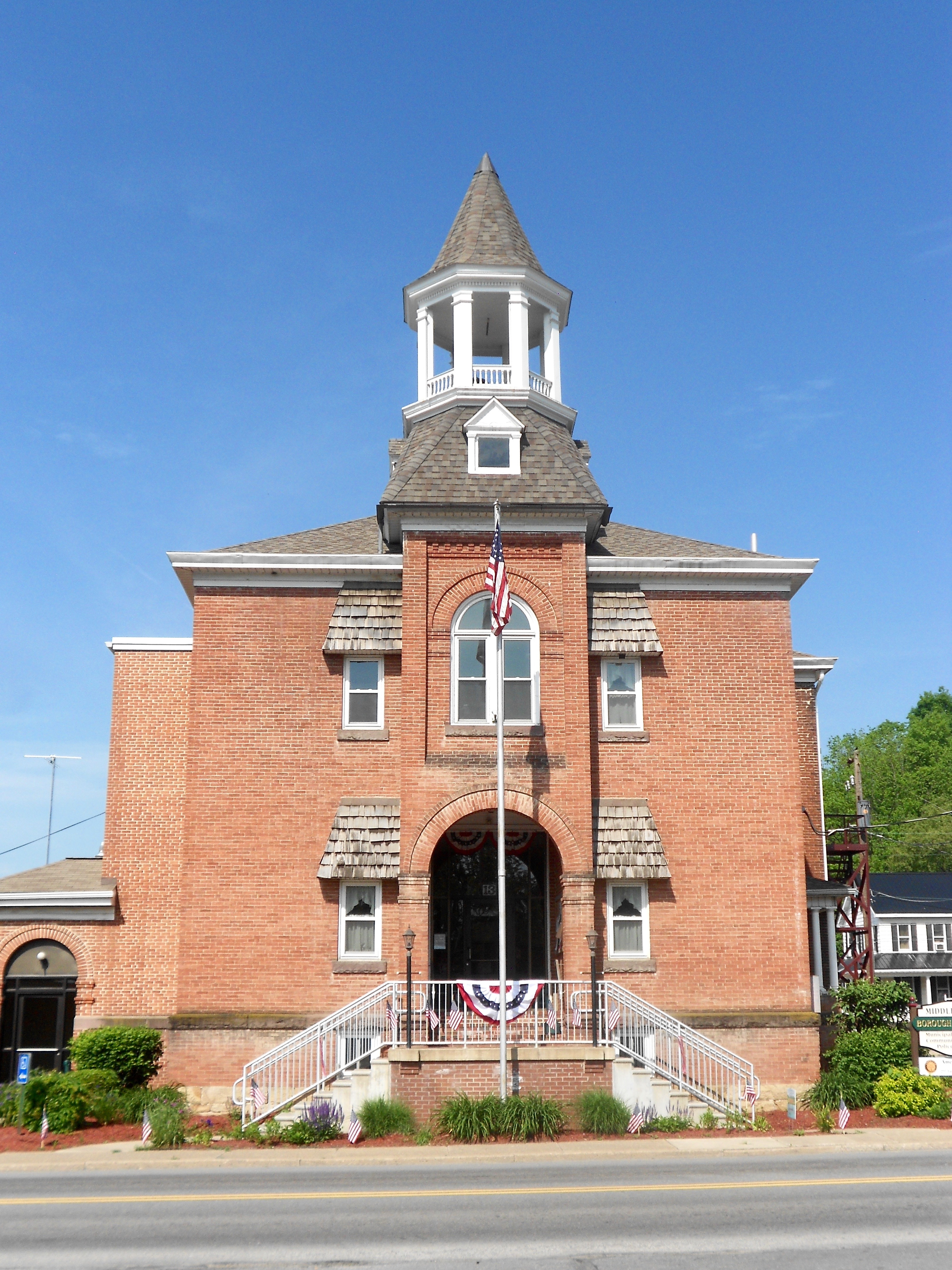
Borough Hall

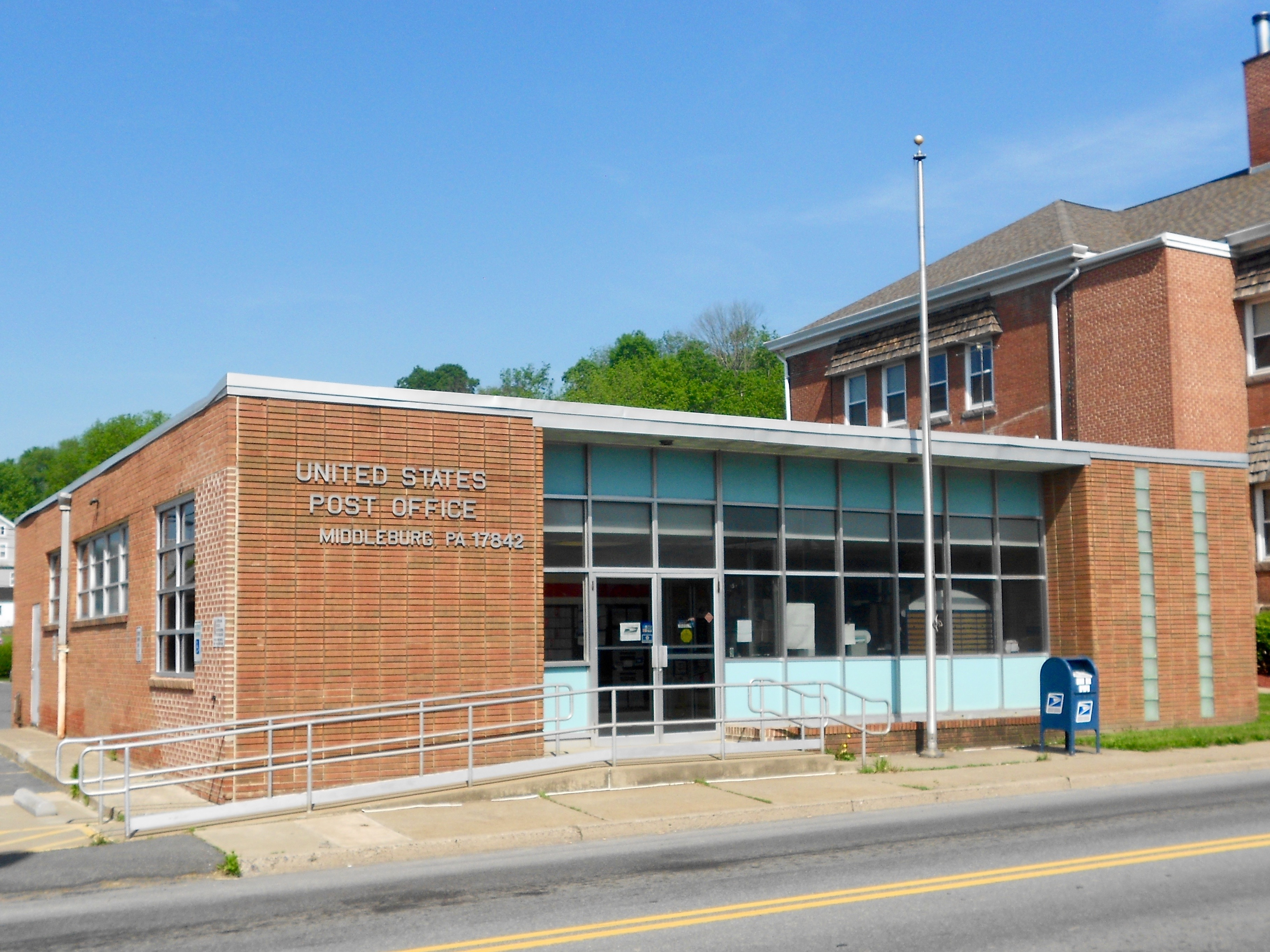
Post office

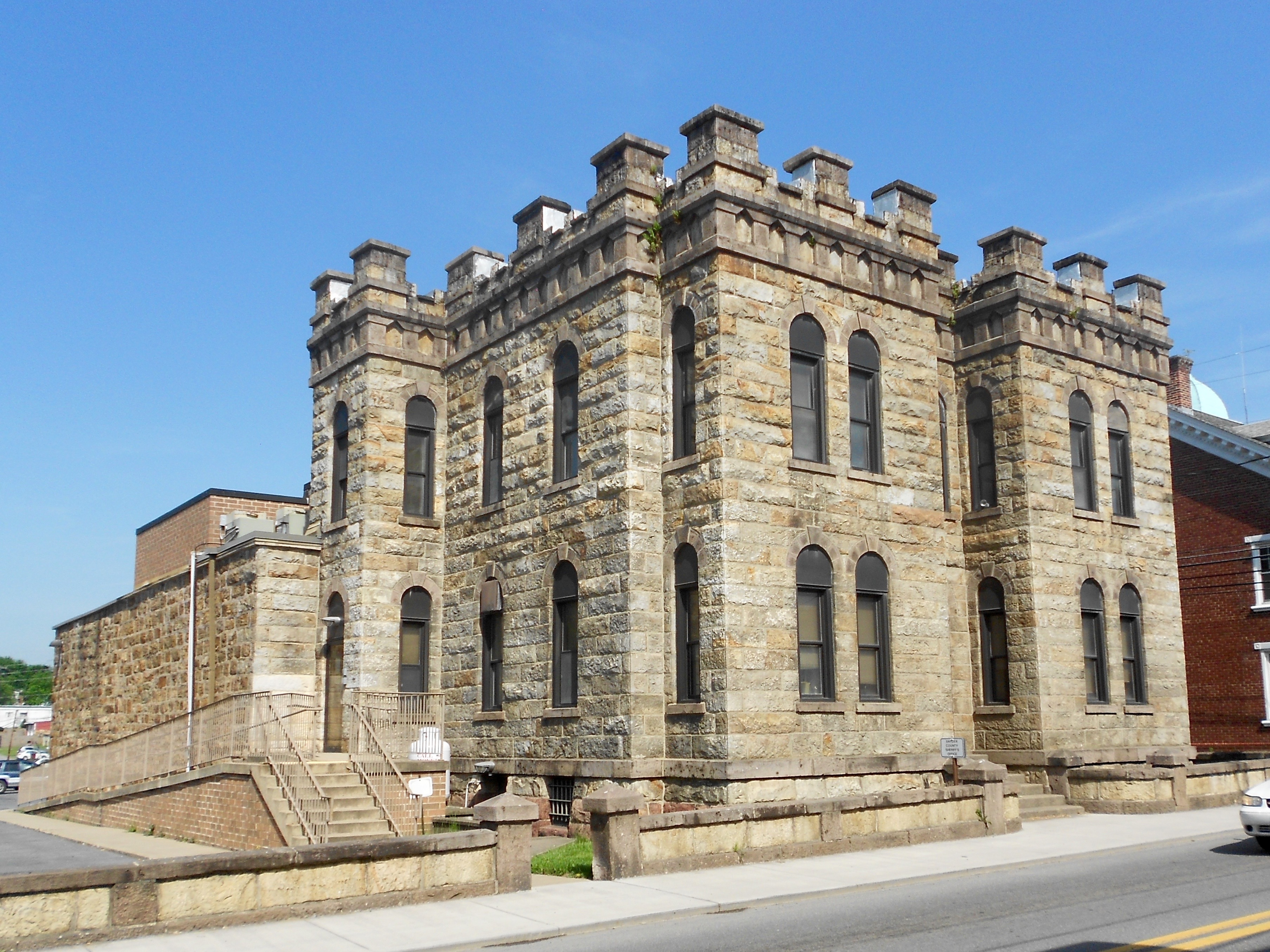
Snyder County Prison

According to the United States Census Bureau, the borough has a total area of 0.9 square miles (2.3 km^{2}), all land.

== Media ==
There are three regular regional newspapers: The Snyder County Times (headquartered in borough), The Shopper, and The Daily Item.

== Demographics ==
Historical population
Census	Pop.	Note	%±
1870	370		—
1880	398		7.6%
1890	420		5.5%
1900	513		22.1%
1910	531		3.5%
1920	984		85.3%
1930	1,024		4.1%
1940	1,124		9.8%
1950	1,283		14.1%
1960	1,366		6.5%
1970	1,369		0.2%
1980	1,357		−0.9%
1990	1,422		4.8%
2000	1,382		−2.8%
2010	1,309		−5.3%
2020	1,325		1.2%
2021 (est.)	1,317	▼	−0.6%

As of the census of 2000, there were 1,382 people, 611 households, and 378 families residing in the borough. The population density was 1,557.3 inhabitants per square mile (601.3/km^{2}). There were 653 housing units at an average density of 735.8 per square mile (284.1/km^{2}). The racial makeup of the borough was 98.55% White, 0.43% African American, 0.29% Asian, 0.22% from other races, and 0.51% from two or more races. Hispanic or Latino of any race were 0.36% of the population.

There were 611 households, out of which 29.8% had children under the age of 18 living with them, 47.0% were married couples living together, 11.3% had a female householder with no husband present, and 38.0% were non-families. 33.9% of all households were made up of individuals, and 18.0% had someone living alone who was 65 years of age or older. The average household size was 2.26 and the average family size was 2.89.

In the borough the population was spread out, with 25.0% under the age of 18, 7.2% from 18 to 24, 27.9% from 25 to 44, 20.5% from 45 to 64, and 19.4% who were 65 years of age or older. The median age was 37 years. For every 100 females there were 89.8 males. For every 100 females age 18 and over, there were 82.4 males.

The median income for a household in the borough was $30,766, and the median income for a family was $36,944. Males had a median income of $27,083 versus $22,422 for females. The per capita income for the borough was $16,660. About 9.2% of families and 10.8% of the population were below the poverty line, including 15.6% of those under age 18 and 9.3% of those age 65 or over.
