= Eddy Creek =

Eddy Creek may refer to:

- Eddy Creek (Kentucky), a stream in Caldwell and Lyon counties
- Eddy Creek (Lackawanna River), a stream in Pennsylvania
