= Elizabeth Henry Campbell Russell =

American Methodist lay leader (1749–1825)

Elizabeth Henry Campbell Russell (1749 – March 18, 1825) was a Methodist lay leader from the United States of America who is credited with bringing Methodism to western Virginia and northeastern Tennessee.

== Early life ==
Russell, who was a sister of Patrick Henry and Annie Henry Christian, was born in Hanover County, Virginia, to John Henry and Sarah Winston. In 1776 she married Gen. William Campbell (1745–1781), the commander of the American forces that defeated the British at the Battle of King's Mountain in 1780; this was the turning point of the American Revolution.

Following Campbell's death in 1781, she married Gen. William Russell in 1783. They lived at Aspenvale, near Seven Mile Ford, Virginia

== Career ==
In 1788 Russell moved to Saltville with William, where they carried on the manufacture of salt. The Russells converted to Methodism in 1788. After William's death in 1793, Russell spent the remainder of her life fostering Methodism in southwestern Virginia and northeastern Tennessee. Francis Asbury and various Circuit Riders stopped regularly at her home. She is credited with bringing Methodism to western Virginia and northeastern Tennessee. In 1812 she moved to Chilhowie, Virginia, to be nearer the Great Road. She died on March 18, 1825, and is buried in the Aspenvale Cemetery in Seven Mile Ford, Virginia. The Elizabeth Cemetery in Saltville, Virginia is named after her.

Madame Russell is probably more eminent in the Methodist pioneer history of America than any other woman. In Saltville, in 1824, a Methodist church, Elizabeth Church, was dedicated in her name. In 1898 construction was begun on a new Methodist church, located a few feet from the then still standing Russell home. That church, Madam Russell Memorial United Methodist Church, stands today as a monument to Mrs. Russell, the region's earliest religious leader, and to the pioneer Methodist Movement in the Holston Territory of Southwest Virginia and Northeast Tennessee. In present day Saltville, there now stands a beautiful stone building named 'Madam Russell Methodist Church.' Nearby is a replica of the original log cabin where the Russell's had lived. This is owned by the church. The stone doorstep of the church is said to have been the hearth in the Russell cabin.

— Madam Russell by Gladys Stallard
