= Samuel Barton =

American explorer (1749–1810)

Colonel Samuel Barton (May 1749 – January 1810) was a pioneer and Patriot of the American Revolution (1775–1783) but is remembered more for the exploration and settlement of what was to become Nashville, Tennessee. Little is known of his early youth. Family tradition holds that Samuel, born in Virginia, was left bound as an apprentice while his father returned to England for business only to be lost at sea. Recent y-DNA testing of a male descendant of Samuel Barton has shown that this branch of Barton's are part of a lineage whose earliest known member in America was Lewis Barton of Maryland.

Regardless of the chronology it is evident that he vacillated between his native Virginia and the wilds of Tennessee. In 1774 he fought as a ranger against Native Americans in Lord Dunmore's War. With the onset of the American Revolution he mustered in Virginia in June 1775. He served as sergeant in Morgan's Rifles of the 7th Virginia Regiment, the acclaimed snipers. As an explorer, hunter and frontiersman Barton proved an ideal soldier. Botetourt County, Virginia court records log his marriage to Martha Robertson on March 10, 1778.

With the advantages of military training and leadership he returned to Tennessee, then part of North Carolina, and contributed to the settling and development of Fort Nashborough, what was to become Nashville. His original home was called Barton Station and was located on Browns Creek where Lipscomb University now stands. Barton was a land trader. He bought and sold land grants given for military service in the American Revolutionary War. Barton, General James Robertson and other prominent men of the area drafted and signed the Cumberland Compact in May 1780. This document served as an informal "constitution" until Tennessee became the 16th state of the Union in 1796. The settlement was governed by the "Tribunal of Notables", Barton being one of the twelve. In April 1781, a few days before the "Battle of the Bluffs", he suffered a shot in the wrist defending pioneers from Native Americans.

On January 7, 1783, a second Cumberland Compact was created and signed by Barton and nine other founders. Upon the creation of Davidson County in April of that year Barton was appointed as justice of the peace and judge of the county court. In October 1783 he was elected as court entry-taker and was sworn in as 2nd major of the militia. In 1784 Barton was designated as one of the five directors as well as treasurer of the fledgling city. He was later selected as a colonel of the militia.

In 1798, not yet 50 years of age, Samuel Barton resigned from civic life and moved his large family to what would the next year become Wilson County, Tennessee. For the last 12 years of life he farmed his extensive land holdings, having been granted more than 1,000 acres (4.0 km^{2}). His large plantation was on Jenning's Fork of Round Lick Creek. He took up the vocation of surveying and appraising land. His burial site is unknown.

== Children ==
- Jane Barton-married-1st John Bradley, Jr., 2nd William Woodward
- Margaret Barton-married-Joseph Love Wilson
- Elizabeth Barton-married-Thomas Dooley
- Samuel Barton, Jr.-killed-War of 1812
- Stephen Barton-married-Eleanor Baird
- Joseph Barton-married-unknown
- Gabriel Barton-married-Jane Johnson
