= Aspenvale Cemetery =

Historic cemetery in Virginia, United States

- U.S. National Register of Historic Places
- Virginia Landmarks Register
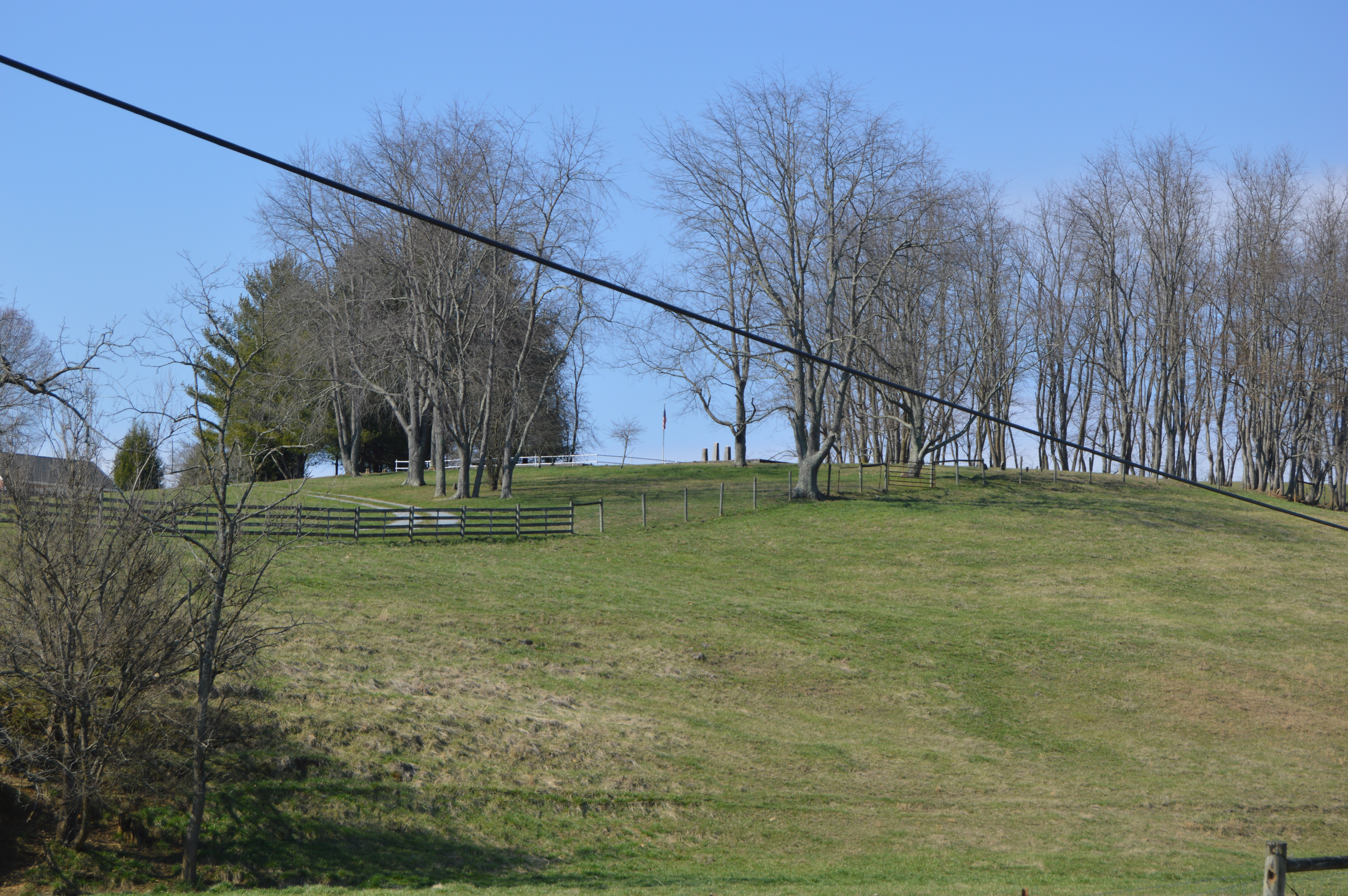
- Distant view from the south

- Location within Virginia Location within the United States
- Location: E. Main St., Seven Mile Ford, Virginia
- Coordinates: 36°48′52″N 81°38′25″W
- Area: 1 acre (0.40 ha)
- Built: 1780
- NRHP reference No.: 80004226
- VLR No.: 086-0013

Significant dates
- Added to NRHP: December 5, 1980
- Designated VLR: September 16, 1980

Aspenvale Cemetery is a historic cemetery located at Seven Mile Ford, Smyth County, Virginia. The cemetery consists of three sections, with the most prominent marked by a T-shaped limestone wall and containing the graves of the Preston and Campbell families. It includes the grave of Revolutionary War General William Campbell (c. 1745–1781) and his wife Elizabeth Henry Campbell Russell (1749–1825), sister of Patrick Henry. William Campbell's remains were originally placed in a marble table tomb erected by his son-in-law, General Francis Preston (1765–1835) in 1823. It was replaced in 1964.

It was listed on the National Register of Historic Places in 1980.
