= Augusta Resolves =

The Augusta Resolves was a statement adopted on February 22, 1775 by six representatives of Augusta County, Colony of Virginia, in the early stages of the American Revolution. The resolves expressed support for Congress' resistance to the Intolerable Acts, issued in 1774 by the British Parliament, and a commitment to risk 'lives and fortune' in preservation of natural rights.

== Background and drafting ==
After Parliament passed the Coercive Acts, also known as the Intolerable Acts, to punish Massachusetts for the Boston Tea Party, the Virginia House of Burgesses proclaimed that June 1, 1774, would be a day of "fasting, humiliation, and prayer" as a show of solidarity with Boston. In response, Lord Dunmore, the royal governor of Virginia, dissolved the House of Burgesses. The burgesses reconvened at the Raleigh Tavern on May 27 and called for Virginia's counties to elect delegates to a special convention to meet in August. Thomas Lewis and Samuel McDowell were elected as Augusta County's representatives to the convention.

On February 22, 1775, the six authors of the Augusta Resolves met in Staunton, Virginia, where they drafted a statement that asserted their commitment "to enjoy the free exercise of conscience, and of human nature. These rights were are fully resolved, with our lives and our fortune, inviolably to preserve..." The resolves were endorsed in a meeting of freeholders of Augusta County and published in Pinkney's March 16, 1775 Virginia Gazette.

== Text summary and effect ==
The resolves expressed a respect for Great Britain and a desire to repair relations between the mother county and the colonies, and made the following assertions and recommendations to the Virginia Convention:

- a commitment to risk 'life and fortune' to retain natural rights
- an intent to ally with the colonies at large, if necessary, in order to secure these rights
- a proposal to institute domestic manufacture of salt, steel, wool cards, paper, and gunpowder for use of colonial militias
- a recommendation to the militia officers of all counties to make themselves "masters of the military exercises"

== Context and legacy ==
At least fifty-nine of sixty-four Virginia jurisdictions passed similar resolutions from between June 1774 and winter 1775. Two 'waves' of resolutions occurred, the first being from June–August 1774 and the second from December 1774 – March 1775. The Augusta Resolves were part of the 'second wave', the delay owing to the county's involvement in Dunmore's War from May–October 1774.

Historian Jim Glanville states that the resolutions of Virginia's four western counties (Augusta, Botetourt, Fincastle, and Pittsylvania) are best viewed as a whole and are "by far the most significant statements in support of American liberty" of those from the second wave, and were precursors to the Declaration of Independence issued by the Second Continental Congress on July 4, 1776.

George Washington is said to have responded to the revolutionary spirit of these counties:

"Strip me of the dejected and suffering remnants of my army; take from me all that I have left; leave me but a banner; give me but the means to plant it upon the mountains of West Augusta, and I will yet draw around me the men who will lift up their bleeding country from the dust and set her free."

== Authors ==
- Alexander Balmain
- Sampson Mathews
- Alexander M'Clenachan
- Michael Bowyer
- William Lewis
- George Mathews

== See also ==
- Fincastle Resolutions

== Bibliography ==
- Glanville, Jim (2010). "The Fincastle Resolutions". The Smithfield Review. XIV.
- Waddell, Joseph Addison (5 May 1886). Annals of Augusta County, Virginia: With Reminiscences Illustrative of the Vicissitudes of Its Pioneer Settlers; Biographical Sketches of Citizens Locally Prominent, and of Those who Have Founded Families in the Southern and Western States; a Diary of the War, 1861–'5, and a Chapter on Reconstruction. Wm. Ellis Jones. p. 149 – via Internet Archive.
