= Alexander Ewing House =

Historic house in Tennessee, United States

- U.S. National Register of Historic Places
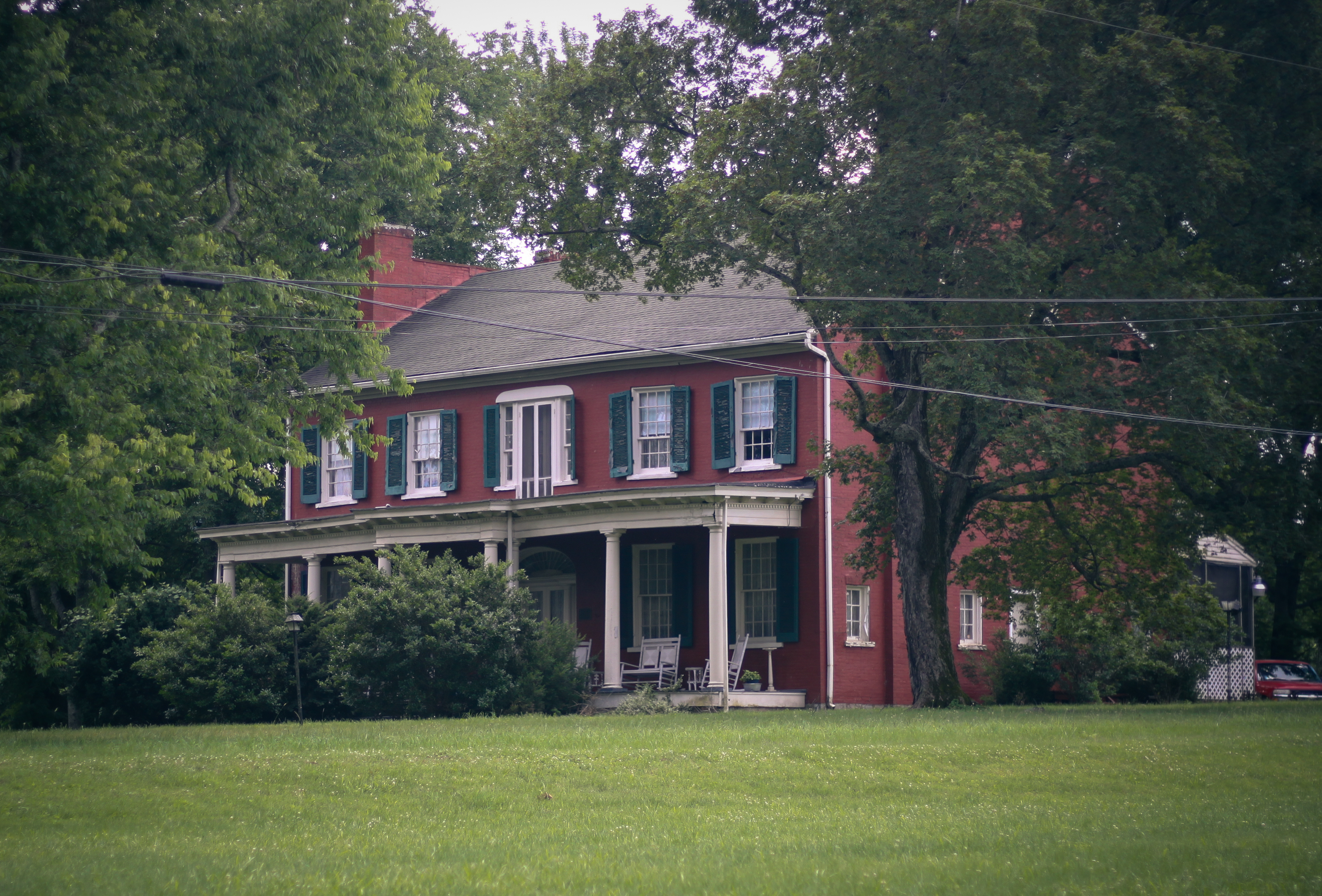

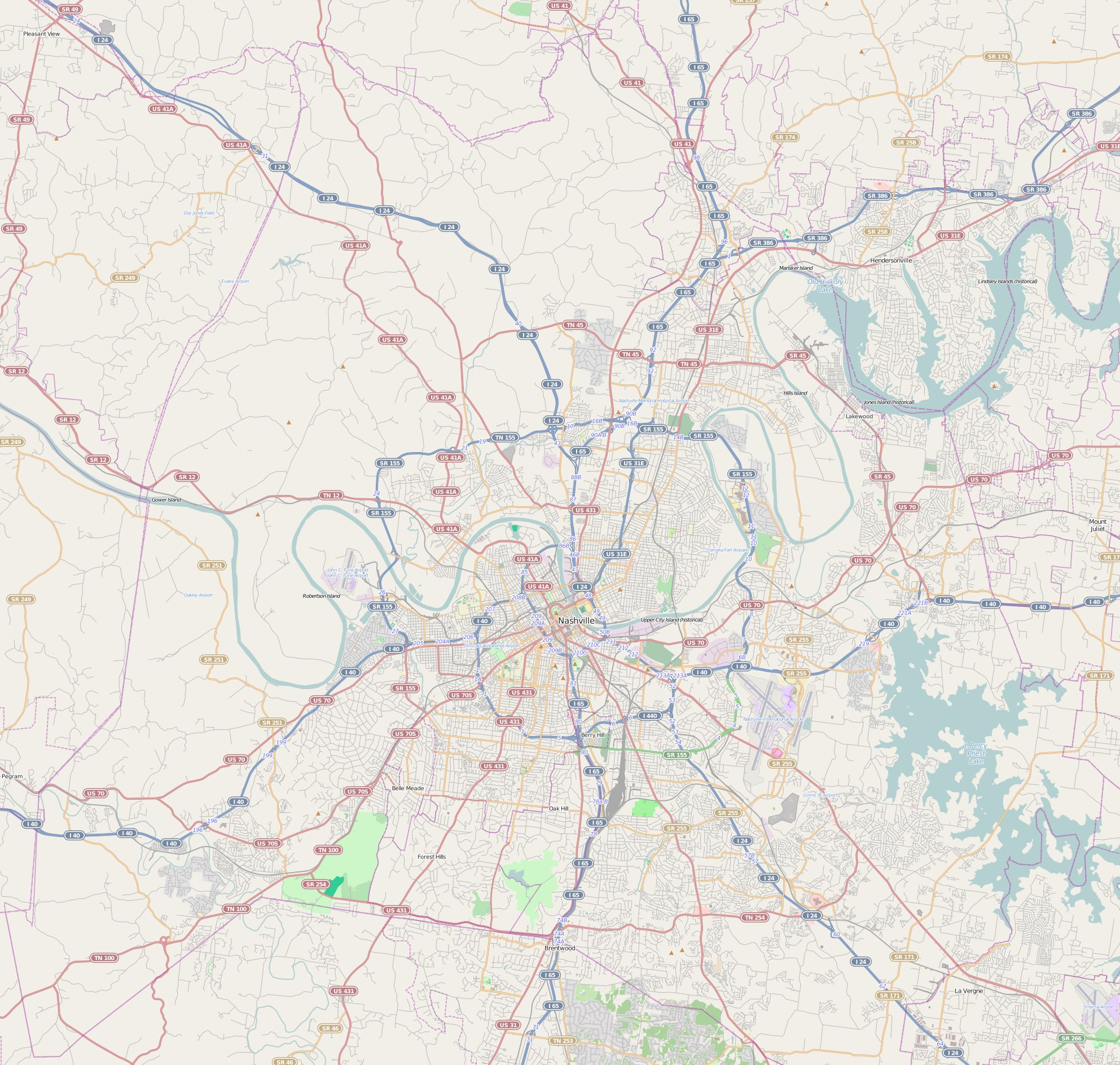
- Location within Nashville Location within Tennessee Location within the United States
- Interactive map showing the location of Alexander Ewing House
- Location: 5101 Buena Vista Pike, Nashville, Tennessee
- Coordinates: 36°14′3″N 86°49′38″W
- Area: 2 acres (0.81 ha)
- Built: 1821
- Architectural style: Federal
- NRHP reference No.: 80003790
- Added to NRHP: November 25, 1980

The Alexander Ewing House is a historic mansion in Nashville, Tennessee, U.S. The two-story plantation home was built in 1821 in the Federal architecture style for Alexander Ewing. It is constructed of brick with a stone foundation and a gable roof. Both the north and south side elevations feature a pair of chimneys connected by a parapet wall. The house has been listed on the National Register of Historic Places since November 25, 1980.

== History ==
Alexander Ewing was born May 10, 1752, in Cecil County, Maryland. He was a veteran of the American Revolutionary War and the owner of 13 slaves. For his services in the war, Ewing was granted 2,666 acres of land in Davidson County, Tennessee. Ewing moved to Tennessee in 1786 and began adding to his land holdings in middle Tennessee in 1792.

The Ewing House was built approximately 850 feet north of the Frederick Stump House, a tavern and inn from the late 1700s that is also listed on the National Register of Historic Places. It was completed only a year before Ewing died in 1822. After Ewing's death, the house was inherited by his son William Black Ewing. By 1846, another son, Randall Ewing, sold the house to Cornelius Waggoner. By 1850, Randall Ewing moved westward for the California Gold Rush. Meanwhile, Cornelius Waggoner lived in the house until 1872, when it was inherited by his son, Benjamin F. Waggoner. It is currently a private residence.
