= Stumps Run Massacre =

1768 massacre of Native Americans in Pennsylvania

In January 1768, a 33-year-old German-American settler and his 19-year-old servant, named Frederick Stump and John Ironcutter, were found to be responsible for the deaths of four Native American men, three Native American women, and three children over a two-day period. Four of the men and two of the women were killed at Stump's cabin, which was located at the mouth of the Middle Creek near Selinsgrove, Pennsylvania. After Stump and Ironcutter shoved the bodies through a hole in the ice, they traveled up the creek to Stump's Run (the site of present-day Middleburg, Pennsylvania) to kill the remaining woman and the children. These bodies were thrown into the natives' cabins, and the cabins were burned. Stump and Ironcutter were imprisoned in Carlisle on January 23. Before they could be tried, an armed mob stormed the jail and freed both men on January 29. The men were never re-captured.
