= Cumberland Compact =

1780 document establishing the law of settlers in present-day Tennessee

The Cumberland Compact was signed at a Longhunter and native American trading post and camp near the French Lick aka the "Big Salt Springs" on the Cumberland River on May 13, 1780, by 256 settlers led by James Robertson and John Donelson, where the group settled and built Fort Nashborough, which would later become Nashville, Tennessee.

The first temporary residences in Nashville was built by the French settlers. Many settlers used the area of Cumberland River for hunting. Among the first people whose record of hunting are available are Thomas Walker and Kaspar Mansker.

The Cumberland Compact was based on the earlier Articles of the Watauga Association composed in 1772 at the Watauga settlement located on the Watauga River at present day Elizabethton, Tennessee.

The only surviving copy of the Cumberland Compact was discovered in 1846 inside a trunk that once belonged to early pioneer and founder Colonel Samuel Barton. The copy in the Tennessee State Archives is slightly damaged. Other than this the document is intact and legible.

The Cumberland Compact was composed and signed by 256 colonists. One colonist, James Patrick of Virginia, was illiterate and marked his name with an "X". This constitution called for a governing council of 12 judges who would be elected by the vote of free men 21 years of age or older. Unique to the times, the Compact included a clause that these judges could be removed from office by the people. Government salaries were to be paid in goods. Governors are paid 1,000 deer skins, secretaries are paid 450 otter skins, county clerks are paid 500 raccoon skins, and the constables are paid one mink skin for every warrant served. All males sixteen or older were subject to militia duty.

The compact did establish a contract and relationship between the settlers of the Cumberland region and limited the punishment that could be meted out by the judicial system. Serious capital crimes were to be settled by transporting the offending party to a location under the direct jurisdiction of the State of North Carolina for a proper trial. The compact remained in effect until Tennessee became a state.

In 1788, at the first court session in Nashville Andrew Jackson was granted permission to practice law. He was immediately handed the job of prosecuting attorney. In 1793, Judge John McNairy sentenced Nashville's first horse thief, John McKain, Jr., to be fastened to a wooden stock one hour for 39 lashes, his ears cut off and cheeks branded with the letter "H" and "T". The first female convicted of stealing soap and thread was stripped to the waist and publicly whipped nine lashes. By 1800, the first divorce was granted between May and Nathaniel Parker. Henry Baker became the first capital punishment case in Davidson County with the first death sentence of "hanged by the neck until he is dead" for stealing a horse. These records survive in a heavy leather bound book in the care of the circuit court clerk.

== Signers ==
The 256 signers included the following:

- Philip Alston
- Thomas W. Alston
- Samuel Barton
- John Blakemore Sr.
- John Blakemore Jr.
- Isaac Bledsoe
- Andrew Bushong
- John Caffery
- James Cain
- Francis Catron
- Peter Catron
- Philip Catron
- Thomas Cox
- John Jonathon Crow
- John Donelson
- Thomas Edmondson
- Thomas Hutchings
- Andrew Ewing
- Thomas Fletcher
- Richard Gross
- William Gowen
- Henry Guthrie
- Samuel Hays
- Francis Hodge
- Daniel Hogan
- Humphrey Hogan
- James Leeper
- George Leeper
- Isaac Lindsay
- William Loggins
- Robert Lucas
- Edward Lucas
- John Luney
- Peter Luny
- James Lynn
- Kasper Mansker
- Amb's [Ambrose] Mauldin
- Morton Mauldin
- Jesse Maxey
- William M McMurray
- John Montgomery
- William Overall
- Nathaniel Overall
- John Pleakenstalver
- James Ray Senior
- James Ray jr.
- William Ray/Rea
- James Robertson
- Daniel Ratletf
- David Rounsavall
- Isaac Rounsavall
- James Russell (four men by this name)
- Hugh Simpson
- Frederick Stump
- Nicholas Trammel
- John Tucker
- William McWhorter
- Samuel McCutcheon
- Patrick McCutcheon
- Richard Henderson
- Nathaniel Hart
- William H. Moore
- James Shaw
- Samuel Deson
- Samuel Martin
- James Buchanan
- Solomon Turpin
- Isaac Rentfro
- Robert Cartwright
- Hugh Rogan
- Joseph Morton
- William Woods
- David Mitchell
- David Shelton
- Spill Coleman
- Samuel McMurray
- P. Henderson
- Edward Bradley
- Edward Bradley Jr.
- James Bradley
- Michael Stoner
- Joseph Mosely
- Francis Armstrong
- George Freland
- James Freland
- John Dunham
- Isaac Johnson
- Adam Kelar
- Thomas Burgess
- William Burgess
- William Green
- Moses Webb
- Absalom Thompson
- John McVay
- James Thomson
- Charles Thomson
- Robert Thomson
- Martain Hardin
- Elijah Thomson
- Andrew Thomson
- William Leaton
- Edward Thomelu
- Isaac Drake
- Jonathan Jening
- Zachariah Green
- Andrew Lucas
- James Patrick (illiterate; signed with an X)
- John Drake
- Daniel Turner
- Timothy Terel
- Isaac Lefever
- Thomas Denton
- Thomas Hendricks
- John Holloday
- William Hood
- John Boyd
- Jacob Stump
- Henry Hardin
- Richard Stanton
- Sampson Sawyers
- John Holson
- Ralph Wilson
- James Givens
- Robert Givens
- James Harrod
- James Buchanan Sr
- William Geioch
- Samuel Shelton
- John Gibson
- Robert Espey
- George Espey
- John Wilson
- James Espey
- Michael Kimberlin
- John Cowan
- William Fleming
- Daniel Mungle
- William Price
- Henry Kerbey
- Joseph Jackson
- Daniel Ragsdil
- Michael Shaver
- Samuel Willson
- John Reid
- Joseph Daugherty
- George Daugherty
- Charles Cameron
- W. Russel Jr.
- Hugh Simpson
- Samuel Moore
- Joseph Denton
- Arthur McAdoo
- James McAdoo
- Nathaniel Henderson
- John Evans
- William Bailey Smith
- Noah Hawthorn
- Charles McCartney
- John Anderson
- Matthew Anderson
- Bartnet Hainey
- Richard Sims
- Titus Murray
- James Hamilton
- Henry Daugherty
- Zach White
- Burgess White
- William Calley
- Perley Grimes
- Samuel White
- Thomas Hines
- Robert Goodloe
- William Barret
- Thomas Shannon
- James Moore
- Edward Moore
- Richard Moore
- Samuel Moore
- Elijah Moore
- John Moore
- Demsey Moore
- Ebenezer Titus
- Mark Roberson
- Charles Campbill
- John Turner
- Patrick Quigley
- Josias Gamble
- Samuel Newell
- Joseph Read
- David Maxwell
- Thomas Jefriss
- Joseph Dunnagin
- John Phelps
- John McMyrty
- D. D. Williams
- John McAdams
- Samson Williams
- Thomas Thompson
- Martin King
- John Allstead
- Nicholas Counrod
- Evin Evins
- Jonathan Evins
- Joshua Thomas
- James Crocket
- Andrew Crocket
- Russell Gower
- John Shannon
- David Shannon
- Jonathan Drake
- Benjamin Drake
- John Drake
- Mereday Rains
- Richard Dodge
- James Green
- James Cooke
- Daniel Johnston
- George Mines
- George Green
- William Moore
- Jacob Cimberlin
- Robert Dockerty
- William Summers
- Lesois Frize
- John Dukham
- Archelaus Allaway
- Nathaniel Hayes
- Isaac Johnson
- Ezekiel Norris
- William Purnell
- John Condey
- Haydon Wells
- John Callaway
- Willis Pope
- Silas Harlan
- Hugh Leeper
- Harmon Consellea
- James Foster
- William Morris
- Nathaniel Bidkew
- A. Tatom
- William Hinson
- Edmund Newton
- Jonathan Green
- John Phillips
- George Flynn
- Daniel Jarrott
- John Owens
- James Freland
- Thomas Molloy
- Jacob Castleman
- George Power
- Samuel Phariss
