= Kasper Mansker =

American longhunter, explorer and settler

- Born: c. 1750; On the European immigrant ship, Christian, during an Atlantic Ocean voyage, in transit, to the British American colonies
- Died: 1820 (aged 70); Sumner County, Tennessee
- Resting place: Mansker Family Cemetery, Goodlettsville, Tennessee, later, reburial at Peay Park, Goodlettsville, Tennessee
- Other names: Kasper Mäintzger, Kasper Minsker, Caspar Mansker
- Occupations: frontiersman, fur trader, hunter, politician, soldier, explorer
- Spouse: Elizabeth White
- Parent(s): Ludwig Mäintzger/Minsker, Sr. and Maria Esch
- Relatives: John Minsker (brother), George Mansker, Sr. (brother), Maria Ursula Albright (sister), Ludwig Minsker, Jr. (half-brother), Dorothea Barbara Hoschaar (sister), Maria Agnes Minsker (sister), Anna Maria Hoschauer (half-sister)

Kasper Mansker or Casper Mansker, also spelled Mäintzger and Minsker (c. 1750–1820) was a longhunter and one of Middle Tennessee's first European explorers and settlers.

== Early life ==
Kasper Mansker was born on the European immigrant ship, Christian, bound for North America, in 1750. The Mansker family, possibly, came from Merchingen, Merzig-Wadern, Kreis District, Saarland, Holy Roman Empire, where the name is common. His parents, Ludwig Mäintzger and Maria Esch, were German immigrants, who settled in the British American colonies, but due to poor recordkeeping there are vague and conflicting reports about exactly where they lived. Mansker had four brothers, John, George, Sr., and Ludwig and one sister, Catherine. Kasper Mansker probably lived in the mid-Atlantic region of the American thirteen colonies. Various reports mentioned the whereabouts of Mansker in Pennsylvania, Virginia, and in what is now West Virginia. However, Mansker soon ventured west to explore the vast lands beyond the Allegheny Mountains. Kasper Mansker married Elizabeth White of Berkeley County, West Virginia but there is no surviving record of the marriage, and the exact date and location are uncertain. There were no surviving children, evidently. Mansker's brother, George, and his brother's sons are mentioned in Kasper Mansker’s last will and testament.

== First hunting trip to Middle Tennessee and Kentucky ==
In 1769, Kasper Mansker departed on his first hunting trip into the vast western territory. He explored and hunted extensively along the Cumberland River in middle Tennessee and Kentucky. He spent most of his adult life exploring, hunting and living in the areas of what are now Kentucky, Tennessee, Georgia, and Mississippi. His first trip was filled with adventures of the hunt, survival, and his party was robbed of some of its supplies by a small band of Indians. In contrast, the French fur traders they met were friendly and his hunting party was able to trade for fresh food and alcohol.

== Second hunting trip to Middle Tennessee and Kentucky ==
In 1771, Kasper Mansker made a second trip into the areas of Kentucky and Tennessee with Col. John Montgomery. This trip was marred by the disappearance of two members of their party who had remained at the camp in Kentucky while additional supplies were being acquired. He eventually set up camp along the Cumberland River in Sumner County, Tennessee. Once again Indians attacked their camp and plundered supplies and took about 500 deer skins. These were eventually replaced. In 1772, Mansker identified an ideal hunting area with two salt licks located close to each other. Hunting was excellent, and Mansker eventually built a fort for himself and his neighbors at this site, near what is now Goodlettsville, Tennessee, in 1780. The fort was an important stopping place for settlers who arrived in Middle Tennessee during the late 18th century until the early 19th century.

== Exploration of the Cumberland River of Middle Tennessee ==
In 1773, Kasper Mansker returned to his home in Virginia, where his name appears in court documents as serving on jury duty and as a witness in a separate case. His stay in Virginia was brief, and he returned in 1775 to Middle Tennessee and the vicinity of Mansker's Lick. During this trip Mansker explored the section of the Cumberland River near the Red River with John Montgomery near the site of present-day Clarksville, Tennessee.

== Robertson-Donelson party and Fort Nashborough settlement ==
The years of the American Revolutionary War were mostly uneventful for Kasper Mansker. In 1779, he joined Captain James Robertson and John Donelson's party, who were looking for suitable territory to establish a new settlement. The site they chose was known as French Lick, later Fort Nashborough, and the site of Nashville, Tennessee, today.

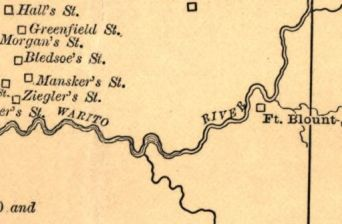
An early map of late-18th century frontier forts or "stations" which depicts Mansker's Station, in the Upper Cumberland River valley of Middle Tennessee.

== Mansker's Station ==
In early 1780, Kasper Mansker moved further north and established his own fort, at Goodlettsville, which he named Mansker's Station. A “station” was the term used for a fortified frontier settlement. Mansker was a signer of the Cumberland Compact, an agreement providing guidelines for government in the developing Cumberland region. The compact established the Cumberland Association, a governing body for the region made up of representatives from the stations or settlements, about seven, in the vicinity of Nashville, including Mansker's Station.

The Native Americans who inhabited Middle Tennessee increasingly realized that the arrival of European settlers was unending, and feared for the loss of their hunting grounds. This eventually resulted in a series of attacks by the native Indians against settlers in the region, during which Mansker's Station served as a refuge for settlers, including John Donelson and Andrew Jackson. Kasper Mansker was regarded as one of the earliest innkeepers among the Cumberland settlements. In the spring of 1781, Mansker himself was the victim of an Indian attack and was listed as wounded in the skirmish. This is the only record of an injury suffered by Mansker due to conflict with Native Americans.
