= Fincastle Resolutions =

Statement expressing support for Congress' resistance to the Intolerable Acts

- Ratified: January 20, 1775; 251 years ago
- Location: Lost
- Signatories: Arthur Campbell; David Campbell; William Campbell; William Christian; Walter Crockett; Charles Cummings; William Edmondson; William Ingles; Thomas Madison; James McGavock; John Montgomery; William Preston; Evan Shelby; Daniel Smith; Stephen Trigg
- Purpose: To declare the intent to stage armed insurrection against the British Crown

Full text
- Fincastle Resolutions at Wikisource

The Fincastle Resolutions was a statement adopted on January 20, 1775, by fifteen elected representatives of Fincastle County, Virginia expressing support for Congress' resistance to the Intolerable Acts, issued in 1774 by the British Parliament. The resolutions were addressed to Virginia's delegation at the First Continental Congress.

While not the first of the wave of legislative resolutions passed in Virginia on this matter, The Fincastle Resolutions are notable as they were the first to state that they would fight to the death to defend them, shifting the colonial debate away from passive petitioning toward active, armed resistance against British tyranny. This statement was foundational to the independence movement in the American Colonies with a direct influence on the Declaration of Independence.

The final sentence of the resolutions is specifically notable as it became the origin of many well-known speeches, slogans, and motto's throughout the history of the United States:

“These are our real, though unpolished sentiments, of liberty and loyalty, and in them we are resolved to live and die.”

Amongst the better known uses is it being the inspiration of Patrick Henry's famous "Give me liberty or give me death!" speech on March 23rd, 1775 at the Second Virginia Convention.

== Background ==
Other counties in Virginia had passed resolutions similar to the Fincastle Resolutions in 1774, such as the Fairfax Resolves. Still, the Fincastle Resolutions were the first adopted statement by the colonists which promised resistance to the death to the British crown to preserve political liberties. Throughout 1774, the Fincastle signatories had been fighting in Dunmore's War against the Shawnee to the west, and could not formally express their sentiments about the constitutional dispute until January 1775. The Fincastle representatives reportedly adopted the resolutions at Lead Mines (modern Austinville, Virginia), the county seat, located in what is now Wythe County, Virginia.

== Content of the Resolutions ==
The published text of the resolutions began by proclaiming love for and loyalty to King George III, and that "we are willing to risk our lives in the service of his Majesty, for the support of the Protestant Religion, and the rights and liberties of his subjects..." However, the resolutions go on to express dismay that the passage of the Intolerable Acts has threatened the happy relations between "the parent state and the Colonies", and that these violations of constitutional rights are not acceptable.

== Context ==
Historian Jim Glanville writes: "The actions of the Fincastle committee should not (as they almost always have been) viewed in isolation. Rather, they should be examined in relation to the actions of the committees of Augusta, Botetourt, and Pittsylvania . . . Each of the statements adopted by these four counties pledged (in varying language) that the men who adopted them would give their lives in the cause of American liberty."

== Signatories ==
The 15 reported signatories of the Fincastle Resolutions were:

- Arthur Campbell
- David Campbell
- William Campbell
- William Christian
- Walter Crockett
- Charles Cummings
- William Edmondson
- William Ingles
- Thomas Madison
- James McGavock
- John Montgomery
- William Preston
- Evan Shelby
- Daniel Smith
- Stephen Trigg

The clerk of the meeting was David Campbell.

== See also ==
- Augusta Resolves
