= Frederick Stump House =

Historic house in Tennessee, United States

- U.S. National Register of Historic Places
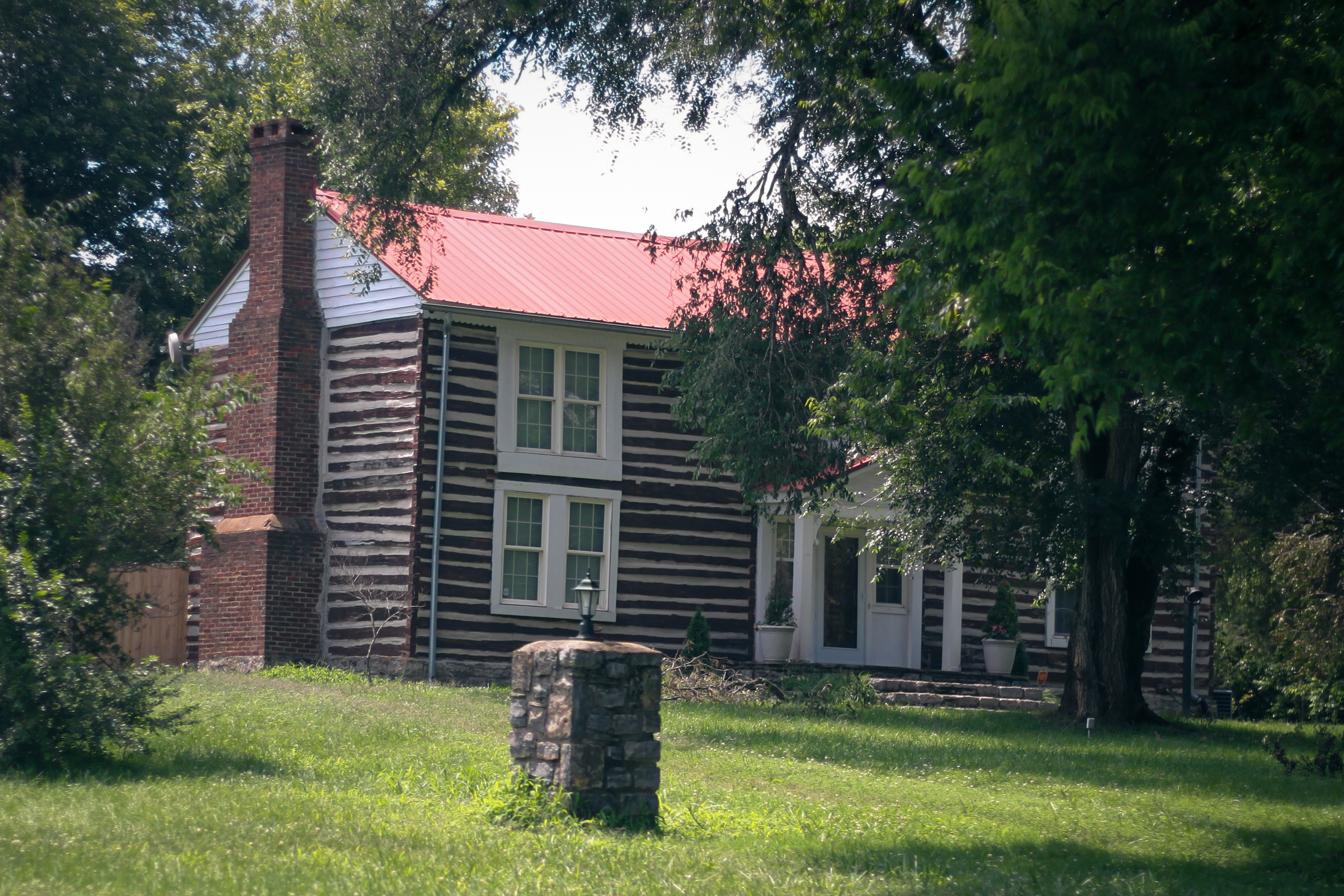

- Location within Tennessee Location within the United States
- Interactive map showing the location of Frederick Stump Inn
- Location: 4949 Buena Vista Pike, Nashville, Tennessee
- Coordinates: 36°14′4″N 86°49′20″W
- Area: 5 acres (2.0 ha)
- NRHP reference No.: 73001762
- Added to NRHP: April 2, 1973

The Frederick Stump Tavern-Inn is a historic house in Nashville, Tennessee, United States. It was built by Colonel Frederick Stump, an early settler of Nashville who arrived in the region as part of the first group of white settlers at Fort Nashboro in 1779. It has been listed on the National Register of Historic Places since April 2, 1973.

The two-story building is constructed of red cedar logs and has eight rooms, including two sleeping rooms on the upper floor and one on the bottom floor. It originally sat closer to the road, but was moved back approximately 100 feet when Buena Vista Pike was widened. The structure is directly down the street from the Alexander Ewing House, another listed historic building constructed in 1821 that sits approximately 850 feet to the north of the Stump House.

== Frederick Stump ==
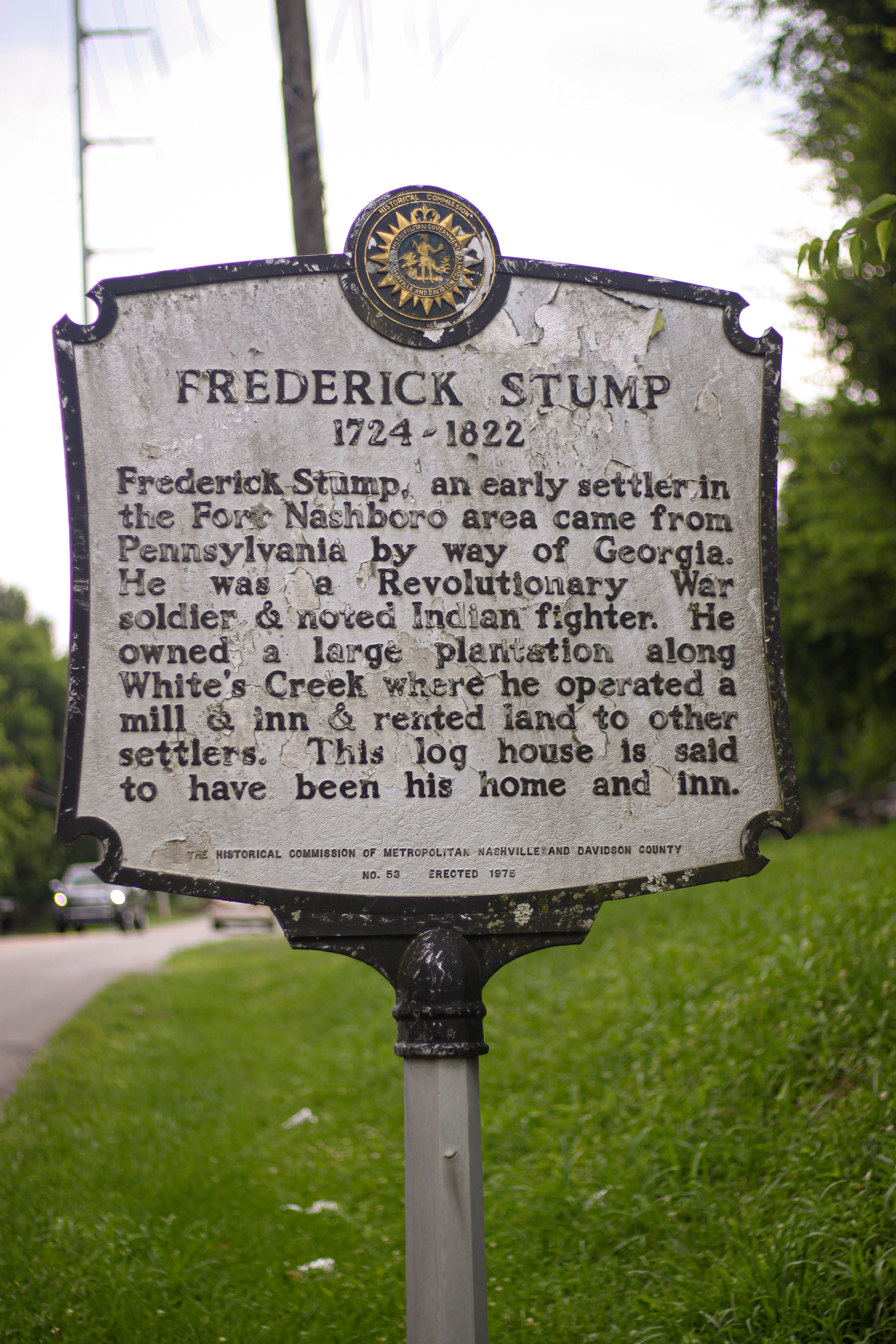
Historical marker at Frederick Stump House

Frederick Stump was born circa 1724. In Pennsylvania by the 1760s he was known to be aggressive in Native American territory. In January 1768, he killed or helped to kill ten native people, including four women, two children and an infant, in an incident later called "Stump's Massacre," "Stumps Run Massacre," or "The Frederick Stump Affair." After bragging about this event to others, Stump was arrested. He initially claimed self-defense, but then managed to escape prison with the help of an armed mob who supported his deeds. Stump ended up fleeing to Georgia and never received any consequences for his crime.

After serving in the American Revolutionary War under Francis Marion, he was arrested, escaped prison again, and fled to Tennessee. He arrived at White's Creek on Christmas Day 1779, and is a signer of the Cumberland Compact, along with his son Jacob Stump who was killed by Native Americans in 1780. Colonel Frederick Stump also built a log cabin home on the east side of White's Creek where he and wife Anna Snavely resided. Stump died about 1820.
