= Seven Mile Ford, Virginia =

Census-designated place in Virginia, US

Coordinates: 36°48′37″N 81°37′46″W

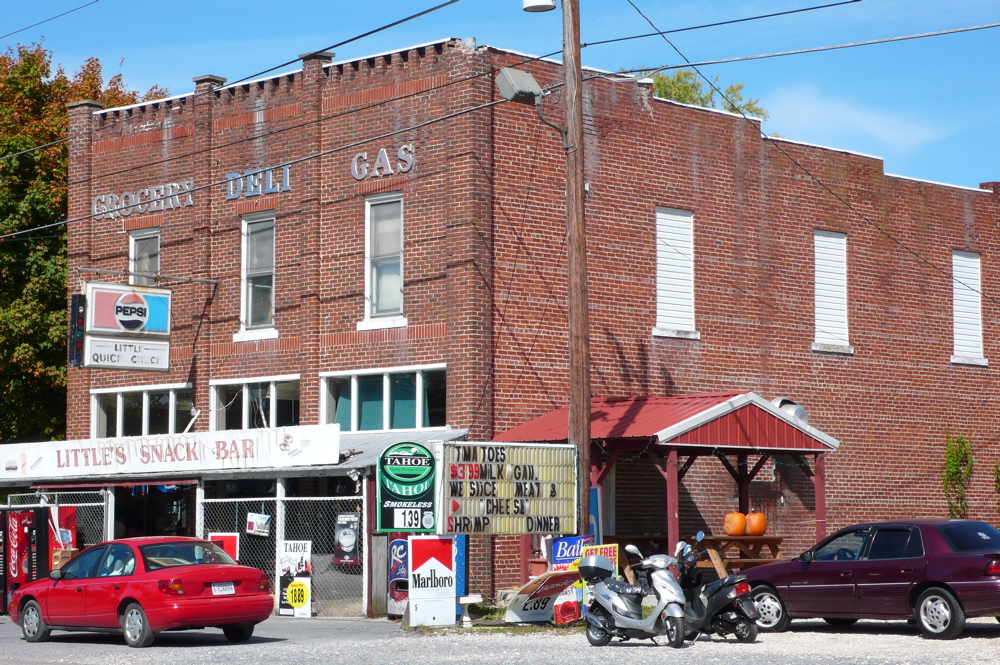
General store

Seven Mile Ford is a census-designated place (CDP) in Smyth County, Virginia, United States. As of the 2020 census, Seven Mile Ford had a population of 664. It obtained its current name as a result of being a river crossing seven miles from the Royal Oak Fort in Marion. U.S. Route 11 passes through the center of the community, which is approximately 4 miles (6.4 km) from Chilhowie.

Aspenvale Cemetery was listed on the National Register of Historic Places in 1980.

== Demographics ==
Historical population
| Census | Pop. | Note | %± |
|---|---|---|---|
| 2010 | 783 | | — |
| 2020 | 664 | | −15.2% |
U.S. Decennial Census; 2010 2020

Seven Mile Ford was first listed as a census designated place in the 2010 U.S. census.
