= Eddy Creek (Kentucky) =

- Eddy Creek in Kentucky

Physical characteristics
- Source
  - coordinates: 37.1164381°N 87.8669588°W
- Mouth
  - coordinates: 37°01′13″N 88°02′55″W

Eddy Creek is a stream in Caldwell and Lyon counties, Kentucky, United States.

Several watermills were built on Eddy Creek in the 19th century.

== See also ==
- List of rivers of Kentucky
