= Stephen Trigg =

American pioneer and soldier from Virginia

Member of the Virginia House of Delegates from Kentucky County
- In office May 1, 1780 – May 7, 1781
- Preceded by: James Harrod
- Succeeded by: None (constituency split)

Member of the Virginia House of Delegates from Montgomery County
- In office May 4, 1778 – May 3, 1779
- Preceded by: John Montgomery
- Succeeded by: William Doak

Member of the Virginia House of Burgesses from Fincastle County
- In office August 11, 1774 – June 1, 1775
- Preceded by: None
- Succeeded by: None

Personal details
- Born: c. 1744 Colony of Virginia
- Died: August 19, 1782 Blue Licks, Kentucky
- Spouse: Mary Christian

Stephen Trigg (c. 1744 – August 19, 1782) was an American frontiersman and soldier from Virginia. He was killed ten months after the surrender of Cornwallis at Yorktown in one of the last battles of the American Revolution while leading the Lincoln County militia at the Battle of Blue Licks, Kentucky.

A son of William and Mary (Johns) Trigg, he mainly worked as a public servant and militia officer during the early years of the frontier counties of southwest Virginia, which then included Kentucky. He was reportedly one of the wealthiest men on the frontier. Trigg was a delegate to the first Virginia revolutionary conventions, and was a member of the Fincastle Committee of Safety that drafted the Fincastle Resolutions, a precursor to the Declaration of Independence passed by the Second Continental Congress on July 4, 1776. He was also elected to the Virginia House of Delegates.

Trigg was appointed to the Virginia Land Court Commission in 1779, charged with settling land titles in Kentucky. He then moved to Kentucky himself. In 1782, a raiding party of Shawnee Indians led by British and Loyalist officers attacked Bryan Station, but were driven off. Kentucky militia companies then pursued the fleeing invaders. Trigg commanded half of the men, while Daniel Boone led the other. The mounted militiamen soon overtook the raiders, but the experienced woodsman Boone warned that it looked like a trap. Ignoring Boone's warning, the militiamen charged across the river at Blue Licks, only to find themselves in an Indian ambush. Trigg and many others, including Boone's youngest son, were killed in the disastrous battle. Trigg's body was later found hacked into pieces.

Trigg County, Kentucky, was named in memory of Stephen Trigg.

== Early life and family ==
Trigg was a son of William Trigg (1716–1773) and Mary (Johns) Trigg (1720–1773), whose family was prominent on the Virginia frontier. His father served as a judge of the Court of Chancery, an equity court, and the Bedford County Court. Trigg had four brothers, William, John, Abram and Daniel, who were all soldiers in the Revolutionary War. Two of the brothers, John and Abram, would later represent Virginia in the U.S. Congress. Stephen Trigg married Mary Christian, daughter of another Virginia pioneer, Israel Christian. Trigg lived the early part of his life in southwest Virginia and ran a tavern in Botetourt County.

Trigg and his wife had three sons and two daughters. His daughter Mary married General David Logan, and was the mother of Stephen Trigg Logan, who would serve in the Illinois state legislature and become Abraham Lincoln's law partner in Springfield, Illinois.

== Virginia pioneer ==
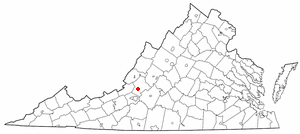
Location of Fincastle, Virginia

The western county of Augusta in Virginia could no longer serve the needs of the pioneers along the New River, and the county of Botetourt was created in 1769. Trigg was appointed one of its first justices of the peace, presiding over misdemeanors and other civil cases. From 1770 to 1771, he served as magistrate, Justice of the County Court in Chancery and a Justice of Oyer and Terminer, which was a criminal court. When the town of Fincastle, Virginia was formed in 1770, Trigg was prominent in its development, selling lots and building the town's prison and courthouse with his father-in-law, Israel Christian.

As the population increased, the southwestern half of Botetourt County was separated in 1772 and became Fincastle County. Trigg was one of its first justices of the peace. He was a Justice of the County Court in Chancery and a Justice of Oyer and Terminer, besides being appointment Deputy Clerk and surveyor of the road from New River to the Sinking Spring. Trigg continued pursuing his livelihood as a merchant at Dunkard's Bottom in present-day Pulaski County. From 1773 to 1774, he partnered with David Ross and operated a community store in New Dublin, with branches located in Meadow Creek, Reed Creek and Reed Island. At this time, many indentured servants came to this area of the state. Short of money, they sold themselves to the ship owners for passage to America for a term of servitude that gained them land and tools upon completion. In October, Trigg advertised the sale of 30 white indentured servants at his home with a discount for "ready money". He served as a delegate to the last session of the Virginia House of Burgesses in 1775, representing Fincastle County, but he absented himself to serve as a captain in Dunmore's War.

Settlers again agitated for another split, and so Fincastle County was split into three counties and became defunct in 1776; the new counties were Montgomery, Washington and Kentucky. Trigg was again a member of the first court of justices held for a new county, this time Montgomery. He served in the Virginia House of Delegates in 1778.

== Early Kentucky pioneer ==
The new Virginia counties were growing rapidly, and with this growth came trouble. Trigg was appointed as one of the judges to the Virginia Land Court commission of 1779–80 charged with settling land disputes in Kentucky County, Virginia. The Virginia Land Act of 1779 had set up this court of four judges in order to examine the numerous land claims and to certify valid titles. The four judges arrived at St. Asaph in October and triggered emigration to Kentucky as people wished to either certify their claims or seek unclaimed land. They closed their court on February 26, 1780, and prepared to return home. However, in March they were told that they had to reopen the court and stay through April, as claimants were delayed due to weather. Trigg and two fellow judges reconvened on April 16 and heard another 134 cases. In all, the court judged 1,328 claims covering over 1 million acres (4,000 km²) of land. After these sessions ended, Trigg stayed and established his home on 1,000 acres (4 km²) of land at Trigg's Station about four miles (6 km) north-west of Harrodsburg in Kentucky County, Virginia.

When Kentucky County, Virginia, was split into three counties in 1780, Trigg was made lieutenant colonel for the new county militia of Lincoln. He continued his public service by being one of the first justices of the peace, was one of the trustees to lay out Louisville, and served in the Virginia House of Delegates by representing Kentucky County in the 1780–1781 session. It was during this session that he, along with his fellow delegate John Todd, secured passage of the act that allowed the formation of Louisville.

Despite the growth of settlement in Kentucky, white colonists there were far from secure. Historian Virginia Webb Howard wrote of this era:

This was the darkest and most critical period in the history of the early Kentucky settlements. It must be remembered that the settlement of Kentucky was much different from the settlement of most of the other places where the new colony joined the older settlements. Kentucky, instead of adjoining already settled districts, was like an island in the wilderness. There were more than two hundred miles of forest between the settlements of Kentucky and the settlements of the older states.

Trigg continued his service in the militia throughout this period. In 1781, he was made colonel of the Lincoln County militia. In 1782, the four delegates to the Virginia General Assembly from Kentucky pushed for Trigg's recommendation as one of the assistant judges to the newly created Supreme Court for Kentucky, but his early death prevented him from taking this position.

== Revolutionary War ==
Meanwhile, events had moved from local agitations against the British crown to outright war. Early on, Trigg served in local militias, but he also represented Fincastle in the Virginia Conventions. These were five political meetings that started after Lord Dunmore, the governor of Virginia, had dissolved the House of Burgesses after its delegates expressed solidarity with Boston, Massachusetts, where the harbor had been closed by the British. Trigg was at the first convention in 1774 and was elected a delegate to the second convention in 1775, though he did not attend. He was elected to the third convention (July–August 1775), and did appear. He was also a delegate to the Fourth Convention (December 1775 – January 1776), but did not attend.

His other revolutionary activity at the time was as a member of the Fincastle County Committee of Safety, an outgrowth of the Virginia Committee of Correspondence. The Virginia Committee of Correspondence was formed on March 12, 1773, and requested each county to do the same. The British refused to address the issues that were of greatest concern to the colonists, and so the freeholders of Fincastle County met at the Lead Mines on January 20, 1775, forming a Committee of Safety in which Trigg was a member. They were one of the first to respond to the request of the Virginia Committee of Correspondence to form such a body. Committees of Safety basically served as provisional governments for their area. It was at this meeting that they drew up the Fincastle Resolutions, which was a precursor to the Declaration of Independence issued by the Second Continental Congress on July 4, 1776; Trigg was one of the signatories. The resolutions, addressed to the Virginia members of the Continental Congress, contained the boldest assertion of the grievances and rights of the American colonies. In February 1775, he wrote to his brother-in-law William Christian, suggesting they call another meeting of the freeholders to elect their delegates to the second Virginia Convention. With the news that William Christian was leaving with the Fincastle militia company to Williamsburg to fight, Trigg took over as chairman of the Committee of Safety. On October 7, 1775, they met to express their appreciation of Trigg, writing that "together with the most exemplary zeal and attachment to the liberties of your country, and your indefatigable industry in the service thereof, you merit and deserve our particular thanks."

In 1776, Cherokees entered the war with the aim of driving colonists from their lands, which meant the people living in southwestern Virginia were facing British-armed Cherokees. The members of the Committee of Safety met at Fort Chiswell on June 11, 1776, and drafted a letter to Oconostota and Attacullaculla, chiefs of the Cherokee nation, to meet with them and come to terms for a peace agreement. The letter mentions the colonists' dissatisfaction with Britain:

It is true that an unhappy Difference hath subsisted between the people beyond the great water, and the Americans for som [sic] years, which was intirely [sic] Owing to some of the great Kings Servants who wanted to take Our money without Our Consent, and otherwise to treat us, not like Children, but Slaves, which the people of America will not submit to.

Trigg was one of the signers of this letter. The conflict with the Cherokees was called the Christian Campaign (presumably from Col. William Christian's last name) and Trigg was the paymaster in 1776–1777. In 1777, he was tasked with making a list of men who swore allegiance to several militia companies. By May 1778, the inhabitants along the New River had either left or were ready to leave at a moment's notice, due to increased hostilities with the Shawnee in the area. William Preston, an officer in the militia, felt exposed on the frontier, but was reluctant to abandon his home "Smithfield", not only for the safety of his family, but also for the county records he safeguarded. Trigg was then leaving for his term in the General Assembly, and Preston urged him and the other delegate for a guard. When it was initially presented to the Governor's Council, Preston's petition was denied, but Trigg met several times with Governor Patrick Henry about Preston's situation and won another hearing with the Council. Trigg made three separate appeals in all before carrying his point. When the governor agreed to send a guard of twelve men and a sergeant, Trigg sent Preston the news and also told him of the Treaty of Alliance that was signed in France in February.

=== Last battle and death ===
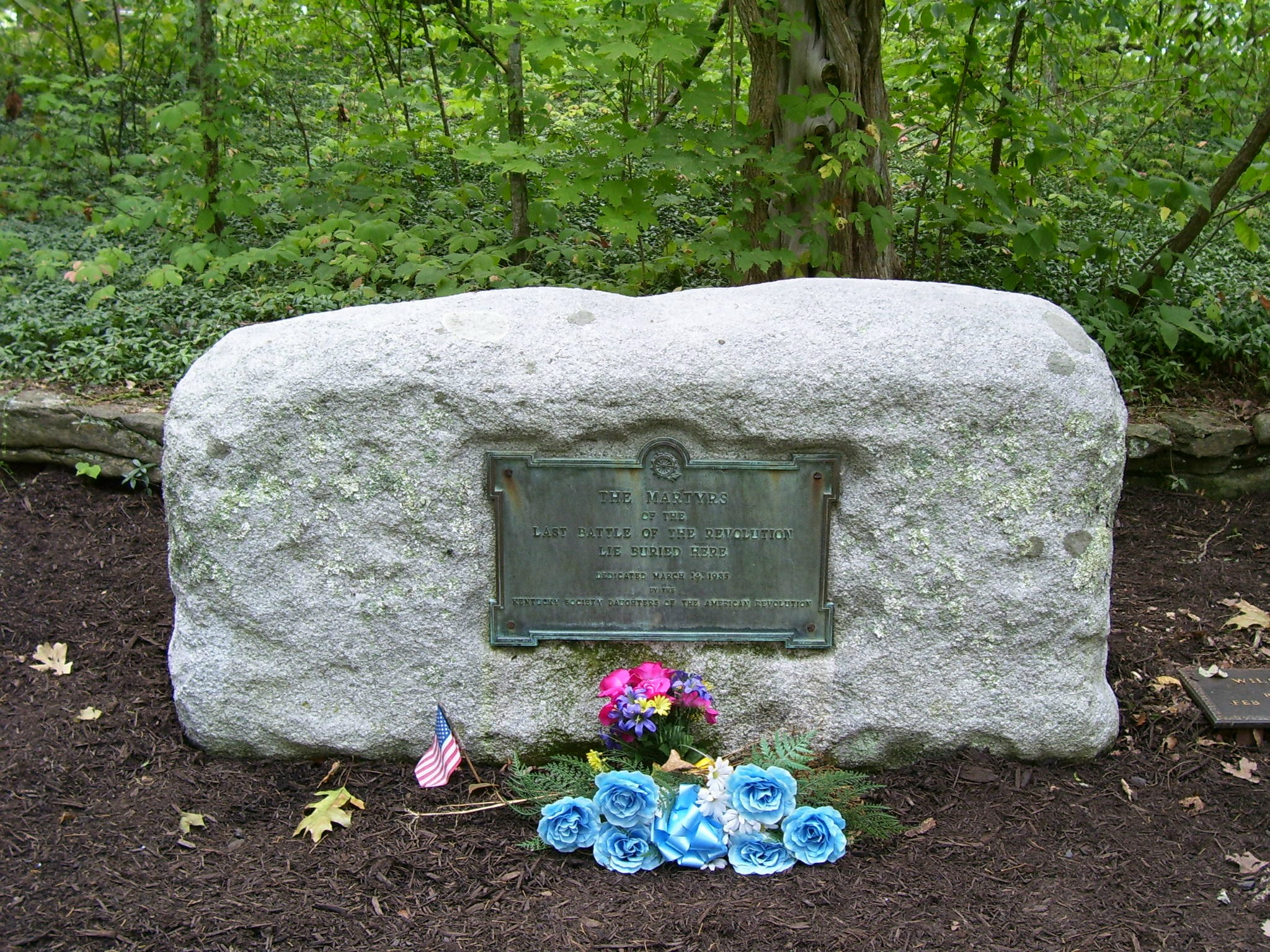
This headstone at the Blue Licks Battlefield State Park marks the mass grave where Trigg and his men were buried.

In 1782, the British launched an invasion of Kentucky with the assistance of their Native American allies, including the Wyandot, Odawa and Ojibwe. When Trigg received word of an attack on Bryan Station, he was commanding the fort at Harrodsburg. He quickly assembled 135 local militiamen and met up with Colonel Daniel Boone and Major Levi Todd and more militia at Bryan Station. When they approached the Blue Licks, a salt lick next to the Licking River, officers suspected a trap and convened a war council, but unruly troops lost patience and crossed the river. The three leaders formed a column each, with Trigg commanding the right. When they met with the opposing force, Trigg's column was ambushed. Trigg was killed and his men fell back after only five minutes of battle. When troops returned to the scene of battle, Trigg's body was found quartered.

Trigg was buried in a mass grave near the battle site, in what is now Nicholas County, Kentucky. Kentucky later named a county Trigg County to honor him. There is a historical marker in Cadiz, on the courthouse lawn, US 68. Historians Lewis and Richard Collins wrote of Trigg, "He was greatly beloved and very popular; and if he had lived, would have taken rank among the most distinguished men of his time."
