= William Campbell (general) =

American military officer, farmer and politician (c. 1745 – 1781)

Member of the Virginia House of Delegates for Washington County
- In office May 1, 1780 – Aug. 22, 1781 Serving with Aaron Lewis
- Preceded by: David Campbell
- Succeeded by: David Campbell

Personal details
- Born: c. 1745 Augusta County, Colony of Virginia
- Died: 22 August 1781 (aged 35–36) Hanover County, Virginia, U.S.
- Spouse: Elizabeth Henry
- Relations: Patrick Henry (brother-in-law)
- Profession: Military Officer; Salt mining

Military service
- Allegiance: United States
- Branch/service: Continental Army; Virginia Militia
- Rank: Brigadier General
- Battles/wars: Lord Dunmore's War; American Revolutionary War; Battle of King's Mountain; Battle of Guilford Courthouse; Yorktown campaign

Brigadier General William Campbell (c. 1745 – August 22, 1781) was an American military officer, farmer and politician. One of the fifteen signers of the earliest statement of armed resistance to the British Crown in the Thirteen Colonies, the Fincastle Resolutions, Campbell represented relatively new Washington County in the Virginia House of Delegates. A militia officer during the American Revolutionary War, he was known to Loyalists as the "bloody tyrant of Washington County."

Notably, Campbell commanded a Patriot militia unit, the Overmountain Men, at the Battle of Kings Mountain. According to legend, Campbell told his men to “shout like Hell and fight like devils.” Campbell's military role at the Battle of Kings Mountain immortalized him while the victory itself was a catalyst for the successful war against Great Britain.

== Early life and education ==
Born in then-vast Augusta County, Virginia to the former Margaret Buchanan and her farmer husband, Charles Campbell (d. 1767). Of Scots-Irish descent, he was baptised at Tinkling Spring Presbyterian Church on September 1, 1745. Educated by private tutors and then at Augusta Academy (a forerunner of Washington and Lee University), he became noted for his courtesy, as well as fiery temper. He had a cousin and brother in law, Arthur Campbell, who also served in the Convention of 1776.

== Farmer ==
Upon his father's death, Campbell inherited a large estate in southwestern Virginia, where he relocated his mother and sisters four years later. He established a plantation called "Aspenvale" about twenty miles from what he later helped found as Abingdon, in what a half century after his death would become Smyth County.

== Civic and military leader ==
In his lifetime, Augusta County, Virginia was split and Botetourt County created in 1770, then Fincastle County, Virginia in 1772. Campbell was one of the justices of the peace upon the organization of Fincastle County in 1773, and the following year was a captain of one of the county's militia units. In 1775, Campbell was one of the thirteen signers of the Fincastle Resolutions, the earliest statement of armed resistance to the British Crown in the Thirteen Colonies, suggesting independence from Kingdom of Great Britain if the government failed to protect colonists from attack. Campell became captain of the first regiment of regular troops raised in Virginia, in 1775.

In 1776, Fincastle County was eliminated upon the creation of Montgomery and Washington County and Kentucky County. Campbell became a justice of the peace for Washington County, as well as one of its militia leaders. However, exposure of his family to Native American attacks led him to resign his commission and return to Washington County, where he became first lieutenant colonel of the local militia, then succeeded Evan Shelby as colonel. Washington County voters elected Campbell as one of their representatives in the Virginia House of Delegates twice: in 1780, and again in 1781 (the year that he died).

As a militia leader of the American Revolutionary War, Campbell became known for harsh treatment of Loyalists. He reportedly executed at least one loyalist, and possibly a dozen, thus leading to their label of him as the "bloody tyrant of Washington County".

Promoted to colonel in 1780, he led his militia to victory at the Battle of Kings Mountain, where he charged the enemy while telling his men to "shout like hell and fight like devils!" Afterward, he worked in conjunction with Continental Army troops to oppose the British invasion of Virginia, providing support at the Battle of Guilford Courthouse. The Virginia Assembly commissioned him a brigadier general in 1781 (the same rank of General Lafayette), as well as voted him a horse, sword and pistols. However, he died campaigning in Tidewater Virginia soon afterward in the closing days of the conflict.

== Personal life ==
On April 2, 1776, Campbell traveled to Hanover County, Virginia, where he married Elizabeth Henry, sister of Virginia Governor, Patrick Henry, whom he may have met during his legislative service. They had two children: Sarah Buchanan Campbell, and Charles Henry Campbell.

=== Salt Lick ===
The tract of land where the Campbells settled was called "Salt Lick" for the area's numerous salt deposits. The salt works that were eventually established there became an important source of revenue for the family, also playing an important role in supplying salt for the Confederacy during the Civil War. It had been surveyed in 1748, when James Patton entered the area with an expedition of several men, including one Charles Campbell. After William Campbell's death, the General Assembly of Virginia granted 5,000 acres to his young son, Charles Henry Campbell, in consideration of his father's distinguished service.

== Burial and legacy ==
William Campbell died, probably of a heart attack, at "Rocky Mills" plantation in Hanover County, the residence of his wife's half-brother, where he was taken to after incurring a fever and chest pains while campaigning in eastern Virginia in July and August 1781. In 1832, his remains were reburied in the Aspenvale Cemetery (near present-day Marion, Smyth County, Virginia), alongside his widow, Elizabeth Campbell "Madam" Russell. She had remarried, to William Russell, a member of the Convention of 1776 and became involved in a controversy between Russell and her first husband's cousin, Arthur Campbell, also a member of the Convention of 1776 and sometimes delegate from Washington County. The cemetery is a Virginia Historic Landmark, with soldiers from six different wars interred there.

Campbell County, Virginia, is named for General Campbell, as is one of the county's schools, William Campbell Combined School.

In her later years, Elizabeth founded the Madam Russell Methodist Church.
