= Fincastle County, Virginia =

Former frontier county in western Virginia

Coordinates: 37°0′0″N 81°0′0″W

Fincastle County, Virginia, was created by act of the Virginia General Assembly April 8, 1772 from Botetourt County. As the colonial government considered Virginia's western extent to be the Mississippi River, that became Fincastle's western limit. Its eastern boundary was essentially the New River (Wood's River at the time, including what is today the Kanawha River), thus dividing Botetourt County from north to south. The new county encompassed all of present-day Kentucky, plus southwestern West Virginia and a slice of Virginia's western "tail". Although no county seat was designated by the act creating the county, the colonial governor ordered it to be placed at the "Lead Mines" of present-day Wythe County; the community of Austinville later developed there.

The governor of Virginia Colony, John Murray, Earl of Dunmore and Viscount of Fincastle, had succeeded Lord Botetourt, the namesake of Fincastle's "parent" county, upon the latter's death in 1770. Botetourt County was established that same year, and two years later, the newly laid out town of Fincastle was chosen as its county seat. Fincastle County's name, like the town's, may have been selected to honor George, Lord Fincastle, the eldest son of Lord Dunmore.

The county was the site of Lord Dunmore's War against the Ohio country Shawnee concluded by Virginia's victory at the Battle of Point Pleasant in Oct. 1774. This resulted in the de facto resetting of the boundary between Indian and colonial lands decreed in the Royal Proclamation of 1763: south of Ohio lands were now colonial lands, though conflicts reignited later, in the Cherokee-American wars.

Initially, land claims in the county were pursuant to warrants for service in the French and Indian War; later preemption claims were allowed. Many of the earliest settlements in Kentucky, including its first town, Harrod's Town, Boonesborough, Logan's Station, and Lexington were founded when it was known as part of Fincastle County. Attempts at organized settlement, ultimately unsuccessful, included the Indiana Grant (including part of southwestern PA), Vandalia Colony and Transylvania Colony.

That the county was named for a loyalist was reason for the American rebels to change its name in 1776. Lord Dunmore in absentia led the military opposition to the rebels in Virginia. He had already issued Dunmore's Proclamation, offering freedom to any of the rebels' slaves who fled their Virginia masters and joined the British forces, which was much resented by the rebel planters and slaveholders.

In December 1776, the Virginia General Assembly abolished Fincastle County and organized three new counties from it: Montgomery, Washington, and Kentucky. In 1792, the successor counties established from Kentucky County were collectively admitted to the Union as the 15th state, the Commonwealth of Kentucky.

The name Fincastle, originally a Glen in Scotland, lives on in, among other places, towns of the same name in Virginia and Kentucky.

== See also ==
- History of Kentucky#Early period of European settlement
- History of West Virginia#Trans-Allegheny Virginia, 1776–1861
- Fincastle Historic District of Fincastle, Virginia
- Fincastle Resolutions, early declarations of the spirit of American independence
