= Southern Journey =

Famed recording tour by Alan Lomax and Shirley Collins

The Southern Journey is the popular name given to a field-recording trip around the Southern States of the US by ethnomusicologist Alan Lomax. He was accompanied on the trip by his then-lover, English folk singer Shirley Collins. It resulted in the first stereo field-recordings in the Southern United States and the "discovery" of Mississippi Fred McDowell. The music collected on the trip has had a significant impact on the development of popular music. Tracks recorded on the trip were sampled by Moby for his album, Play. It also served as the inspiration for the soundtrack to the Coen Brothers' film, O Brother Where Art Thou. The Southern Journey is the subject of an autobiography by Shirley Collins entitled America Over the Water. It is also the subject of s 2017 feature documentary, The Ballad of Shirley Collins. Lomax's own recollections of the trip were documented in his autobiography, The Land Where Blues Began, which won the National Book Award for Nonfiction in 1993.

== Build-up ==
In 1958, Lomax had returned to America after a decade recording the traditional music of Britain, Ireland, Spain, and Italy; producing radio and television series for the BBC; and compiling the eighteen-volume World Library of Folk and Primitive Music for Columbia Records. His voluntary exile had been in no small part prompted by the inception of the McCarthy witch hunts, which had a particular hunger for Lomax’s folk-music peers.

On his return to New York City following the death of McCarthy in 1957, he found an urban folk revival in full bloom. Crowds of young banjo players, guitarists, fiddlers, and fans were gathering in Washington Square Park to pick and sing traditional songs and tunes, many of which Lomax had recorded years earlier from musicians such as Lead Belly, Woody Guthrie, Hobart Smith, and Texas Gladden. The revival was to some extent driven by access to these earlier recordings at Izzy Young's Folklore Center on MacDougal Street, where they had access to hundreds of songs in albums, books (among them Lomax's American Ballads and Folk Songs and Our Singing Country), and burgeoning folk-music magazines such as Sing Out!. Lomax himself was somewhat sceptical about the burgeoning scene he encountered, and on some level it proved to be the catalyst for the Southern Journey collecting trips. He commented 40 years later:

Some of the young folkniks, who dominated the New York scene, asserted that there was more folk music in Washington Square on Sunday afternoon than there was in all rural America. Apparently, it made them feel like heroes to believe that they were keeping a dying tradition alive. The idea that these nice young people, who were only just beginning to learn how to play and sing in good style, might replace the glories of the real thing, frankly horrified me. I resolved to prove them wrong."

Lomax began making arrangements for a field recording trip throughout the American South using a prototype Ampex 600 Series stereo recorder. He secured support from Ahmet Ertegun and Nesuhi Ertegun, of Atlantic Records. Lomax was accompanied by the young British folksinger Shirley Collins, whom he had met in London several years earlier. They had begun a relationship before Lomax moved back to New York, and with the trip impending, he invited her to accompany him to act as his assistant. They left New York City in a Buick Roadmaster in late August 1959.

== The Southern Journey ==
Recording started on August 24 in Bluefield, Virginia, where the pair recorded an old subject of Lomax's, the banjo virtuoso and multi-instrumentalist Hobart Smith. For the next two months the pair traveled through Virginia, Kentucky, Tennessee, Alabama, Mississippi, Arkansas, Georgia, and North Carolina, making over 70 hours of recordings. The project was shorter than every other major recording trip of Lomax's career. It marked the first stereo recordings made of American traditional music in the field, at last doing justice to the sonic complexity of the Georgia Sea Island ring shouts, the many-voiced work songs of the Southern prison farms, and the thunderous hymnody of the Sacred Harp. But perhaps its greatest achievement was the discovery of farmer and bluesman Mississippi Fred McDowell.

== Itinerary ==
| Session date (1959) | Location | Key Performers |
|---|---|---|
| 24-25 August | Bluefield (Virginia) | Hobart Smith, Preston Smith, Texas Gladden |
| 26 August | Salem (Virginia) | Texas Gladden |
| 28-29 August | Hillsville (Virginia) | George Stoneman, Ruby Vass, The Mountain Ramblers |
| 30 August | Rugby (Virginia) | E. C. Ball |
| 31 August | Galax (Virginia) | Wade Ward, Charlie Higgins |
| 3 September | Chilhowie (Virginia) | Spencer Moore, Horton Barker |
| 5 September | Blackey (Kentucky) | Mount Olivet Regular Baptist Church |
| 6 September | Mayking (Kentucky) | Thornton Old Regular Baptist Church |
| 7-9 September | Whitesburg (Kentucky) | Ada Combs |
| 11 September | Lexington (Alabama) | George Fields, Emma Hammond |
| 12 September | Fyffe (Alabama) | United Sacred Harp Musical Association Convention |
| 13 September | Huntsville (Alabama) | St. James Church congregation |
| 16-20 September | Parchman Farm (Mississippi) | John Dudley, Ed Lewis, Heuston Earms, Floyd Batts |
| 20 September | Harmontown (Mississippi) | Viola James |
| 21st, 22 and 25 September | Como (Mississippi) | Mississippi Fred McDowell, Miles Pratcher, Bob Pratcher, Ed Young, Lonnie Young |
| 22 and 26 September | Senatobia (Mississippi) | Sidney Hemphill Carter, Sid Hemphill, Lucius Smith |
| 23 September | Tyro (Mississippi) | Independence Church congregation |
| 30 September- 4 October | Memphis (Tennessee) | Cecil Augusta, Memphis Jug Band |
| 1 October | Hughes (Arkansas) | Forrest City Joe |
| 6 October | Timbo (Arkansas) | Neal Morris, Charlie Everidge, Ollie Gilbert |
| 7 October | Greers Ferry (Arkansas) | Almeda Riddle |
| 8 October | Landis (Arkansas) | Absie Morrison |
| 10 October | Livingston (Alabama) | Vera Ward Hall |
| 12 October | St. Simons Island (Georgia) | Bessie Jones |
| 14 October | Concord (North Carolina) | J. E. Mainer and the Mountaineers |

== 1960 trip ==
in 1960, Lomax was invited to Williamsburg, Virginia, to serve as music supervisor to a historical film being produced by the Colonial Williamsburg Foundation. He used the occasion to do a follow-up tour of coastal Virginia and Georgia, recording again with many of the artists from the 1959 trip, as well as several new artists. Lomax and Collins had split up by this time, and she had returned to England, where two albums worth of material recorded by Lomax and Peter Kennedy before the Southern Journey had recently been released. Lomax was instead accompanied on the 1960 trip by his young daughter, Anna Lomax, who would later go on to found the Association for Cultural Equity.

== Release history ==
When Lomax returned to New York City in late October 1959, he prepared seven albums for Atlantic, which were released as the "Southern Folk Heritage Series". There was much music left over, however, and Lomax ultimately made an arrangement with Prestige Records to issue another series entirely – twelve album volumes under the title "Southern Journey". This latter series featured the new recordings made by Lomax and his daughter Anna in 1960.

Numerous other issues and reissues of material from the recordings includes:

- In 1971, German record label GHP released a solo imprint of the Mountain Ramblers recordings made in Hillsville, Virginia.
- In 1977, New World Records undertook a major re-release of the Southern Journey music, including an imprint dedicated entirely to the St Simons Island sessions.
- In 1995, Rounder Records released thirteen volumes of the "Southern Journey" as a CD series.
- In 2010, a new five LP series, featuring a host of previously unreleased material from the tour was curated by Nathan Salsburg of the Association of Cultural Equity, and Eric Isaacson of Portland, Oregon's Mississippi Records.
- In 2012, digitised versions of the entire recordings were released for free online by the Association of Cultural Equity, who are also running a repatriation scheme, returning Lomax's digitized recordings and photographs to the places they were collected.

== Impact and legacy ==
The Atlantic and Prestige albums were proof that many old-timers were still alive and making music, and Lomax succeeded in involving these tradition-bearers directly in the folk revival. He arranged for appearances at the Newport Folk Festival by Almeda Riddle, Fred McDowell, Hobart Smith, Ed Young, and Bessie Jones and the Georgia Sea Island Singers, all of whom became frequent performers at other revival events and seminally influential figures of the era. Riddle and Jones each went on to make records of their own and enjoy considerable popularity at concerts and folk festivals for decades to come. McDowell appeared on dozens of albums and became a renowned and regarded bluesman. Lomax, sitting on the board of the Newport Foundation, also saw that money left over from the annual festivals was donated to traditional performers and to new documentation projects in the field.

Southern Journey recordings have featured prominently in samples by a range of artists and musicians. Samples appeared on four of the tracks on Moby's Play album. These included "Trouble So Hard" by Vera Ward Hall on the track "Natural Blues", and "Sometimes" by Bessie Smith on "Honey". Two sermon fragments from the recordings have been used by Kanye West on collaborations with Jay Z and Pusha T.

In 2011, the 50th anniversary of the Southern Journey, a season-long tribute series was curated in Belgium, put on by Ancienne Belgique.

== Southern Journey on film ==
The first appearance of the Southern Journey recordings on film were in the 1960 docudrama, The Music of Williamsburg, which was commissioned by the Colonial Williamsburg Foundation. It featured several musicians who Lomax had recorded in 1959, including Hobart Smith, Ed Young, Lonnie Young and Bessie Jones.

In the soundtrack to the Coen Brothers 2002 feature, O Brother Where Art Thou, the film's title sequence was underscored by James Carter's performance of "Po Lazarus", recorded by Lomax at Parchman Farm in 1959. The soundtrack won a Grammy Award, and Anna Lomax initiated a national hunt for Carter, who had never recorded before or after. He was eventually found, aged 76, in Chicago, and presented with a royalty cheque for $20,000, and an invitation to the awards ceremony. The soundtrack also featured versions of several other songs of which versions had been recorded on the Southern Journey. These include "Didn't Leave Nobody But The Baby", recorded in 1959 by Sidney Hemphill Carter, and "O Death", recorded in the Georgia Sea Islands by Bessie Jones. The film's putative band, the Soggy Bottom Boys, also owe a debt of gratitude to the Mountain Ramblers of Hillsville, Virginia.

The 1959 Southern Journey is the subject of Rob Curry and Tim Plester's 2017 feature documentary, The Ballad of Shirley Collins. Alongside documenting Collins' return to singing and recording after a hiatus of 40 years, the film also featured extensive use of archive interviews that Collins and Lomax recorded in 1959, accompanied by modern reconstruction footage based on the photographic record from the trip.
