= Virginia State Route 107 =

State highway in Smyth County, Virginia, US

State Route 107

Route information
- Maintained by VDOT
- Length: 8.39 mi (13.50 km)
- Existed: 1961–present

Major junctions
- South end: I-81 / SR 762 in Chilhowie
- US 11 in Chilhowie
- North end: SR 91 in Saltville

Location
- Country: United States
- State: Virginia
- Counties: Smyth

Highway system
- Virginia Routes; Interstate; US; Primary; Secondary; Byways; History; HOT lanes
← SR 106	→ SR 108

State Route 107 (SR 107) is a primary state highway in the U.S. state of Virginia. The state highway runs 8.39 miles (13.50 km) from Interstate 81 (I-81) in Chilhowie north to SR 91 in Saltville in western Smyth County.

== Route description ==
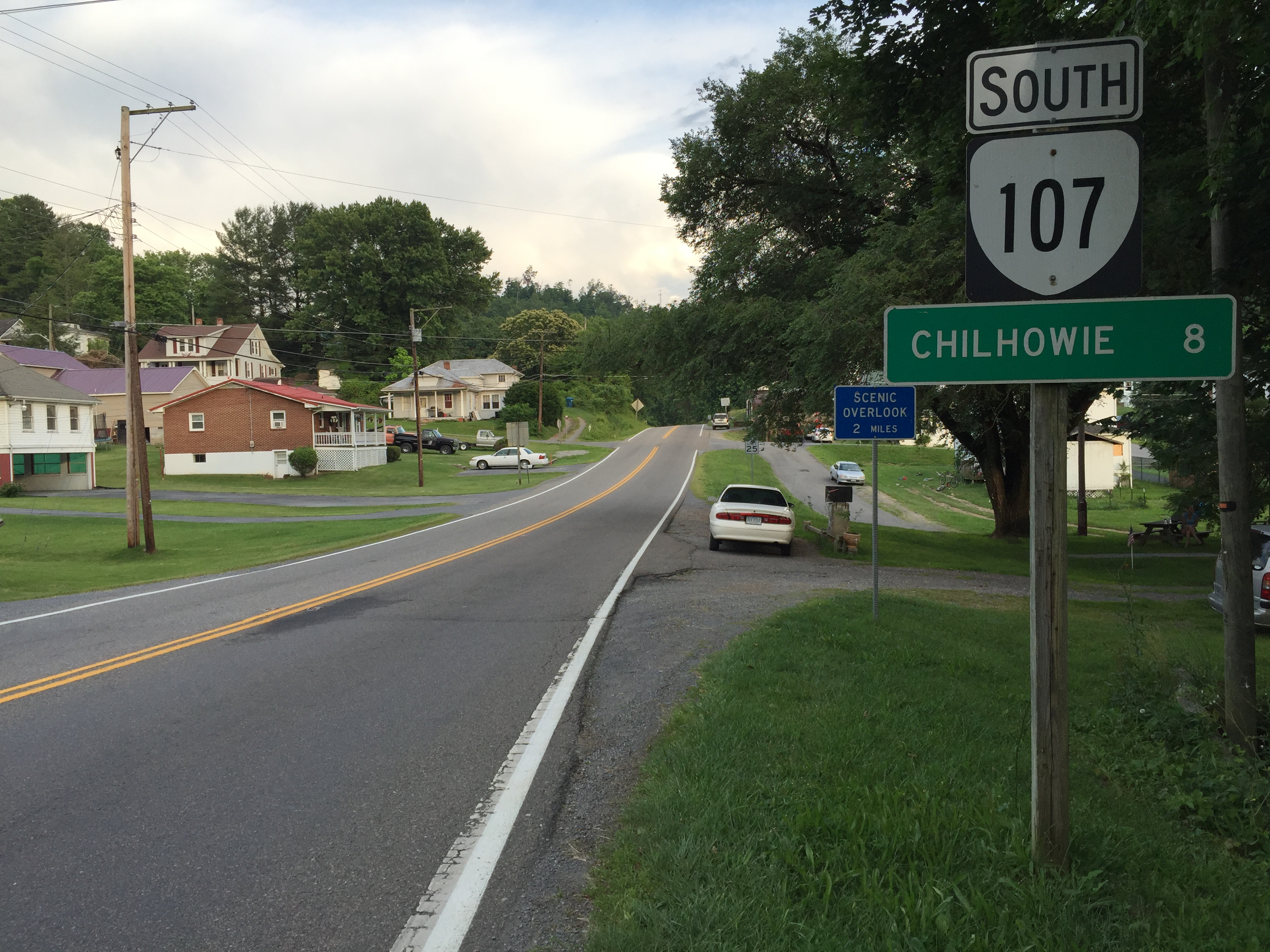
View south at the north end of SR 107 at SR 91 in Saltville

SR 107 begins at the south end of its diamond interchange with I-81 on the southern edge of the town of Chilhowie. The road continues south as SR 762 (White Top Road). The state highway heads north as two-lane undivided White Top Avenue. SR 107 crosses over the Middle Fork Holston River, has a grade crossing of Norfolk Southern Railway's Pulaski District, and intersects U.S. Route 11 (Lee Highway) one block north of Chilhowie's Main Street. The state highway heads north out of the town of Chilhowie. SR 107 follows Sulphur Spring Creek through a gap in Brushy Mountain and passes through Lyons Gap through Walker Mountain. On entering the town of Saltville, the state highway follows Worthy Boulevard, which passes through a sweeping S-curve. SR 107 reaches its northern terminus at an intersection with SR 91 (Main Street) at the east end of downtown Saltville.

== Major intersections ==
The entire route is in Smyth County.

Location	mi	km	Destinations	Notes
Chilhowie	0.00	0.00	I-81 / SR 762 south (White Top Road) – Abingdon, Marion, Whitetop Mountain	I-81 exit 35; southern terminus; former SR 79 south
Chilhowie	0.32	0.51	US 11 (Lee Highway) – Abingdon, Marion	
Saltville	8.39	13.50	SR 91 (East Main Street) – Glade Spring, Broadford, Museum of the Middle Appalachians, Saltville Historic District	Northern terminus
1.000 mi = 1.609 km; 1.000 km = 0.621 mi
