= Fifth Column Films =

Fifth Column Films is a UK film production company best known for feature documentaries Way of the Morris, The Ballad of Shirley Collins and Southern Journey (Revisited).

== Early films ==
Established in 2006, their first project was fiction drama The Boat People, starring Raquel Cassidy and Nabil Elouahabi. They proceeded to make the UK Film Council funded short film Domestics in 2008, which premiered at the Edinburgh International Film Festival. The same year, their microfilm Slaphappy, directed by Tim Plester won best film at the Belfast Film Festival in the 15 second category.

== Feature documentaries ==
In 2011, they had their first major breakthrough with Way of the Morris, a feature documentary by Tim Plester and Rob Curry, about Tim's Morris Dancing village in Oxfordshire. The film premiered at SXSW in 2011, before being released in UK cinemas that summer. The following year, they followed it up with TEMPEST, a feature documentary directed by Rob Curry and Anthony Fletcher. The company self-distributed both films in UK cinemas, an unusual achievement for a small independent production company. Their fiction short, Truck, was commissioned by Creative England and the BFI in 2016. Their feature documentary about iconic British folk singer Shirley Collins, premiered at London Film Festival in 2017 and was hailed as one of the best music documentaries of the year. Other work includes Hillbilly Homilies, a profile piece on the Appalachain poet Maurice Manning, and The Battle Of Denham Ford, which won a Special Mention in the UK Competition at Sheffield Doc/Fest 2021.

== Future work ==
The company are currently completing work on a feature-length documentary about the folklorist Doc Rowe, following a hugely successful crowdfunding campaign in 2023. They are also working with the illustrator and land-rights campaigner Nick Hayes on an adaptation of his best-selling book, 'The Book of Trespass'.

== Productions ==
Film	Year	Director	Notes
The Boat People	2007	Rob Curry	Fiction feature
Domestics	2008	Rob Curry	Short film
Slaphappy	2008	Tim Plester	Short film
End of the Line	2009	Rob Curry	Short film
Forbidden	2009	Rob Curry	Short film
The Living End	2009	Rob Curry	Short film
Way of the Morris	2011	Tim Plester, Rob Curry	Feature documentary
TEMPEST	2012	Anthony Fletcher, Rob Curry	Feature documentary
Here We'm Be Together	2014	Tim Plester, Rob Curry	Short film
The Ballad of Shirley Collins	2016	Tim Plester, Rob Curry	Feature documentary
