= Daniel Sheffey =

American politician

Member of the U.S. House of Representatives from Virginia's 6th district
- In office March 4, 1809 – March 3, 1817
- Preceded by: Abram Trigg
- Succeeded by: Alexander Smyth

Member of the Virginia House of Delegates from Augusta County
- In office 1822; Alongside Briscoe Baldwin

Member of the Virginia House of Delegates from Wythe County
- In office 1808; Alongside Joseph Crockett
- In office 1800–1803; Alongside John Evans and Alexander Smyth

Member of the Virginia Senate from Botetourt, Grayson, Greenbrier, Kanawha, Lee, Monroe, Montgomery, Russell, Tazewell, Washington and Wythe Counties
- In office 1804–1807
- Preceded by: James Patton Preston
- Succeeded by: Francis Smith

Personal details
- Born: 1770 Frederick, Province of Maryland, British America
- Died: December 3, 1830 (aged 59–60) Warm Springs, Virginia, U.S.
- Resting place: Staunton, Virginia, U.S.
- Party: Federalist
- Profession: lawyer

Daniel Sheffey (1770 – December 3, 1830) was a U.S. representative from Virginia.

== Biography ==
He was born in Frederick in the Province of Maryland to Johann Adam Schieffe, a cobbler, and his wife Magdelena Loehr of Südwestpfalz, Germany. They had immigrated to the Province of Maryland about 1764. Largely self-educated, Sheffey pursued classical studies. Apprenticed as a shoemaker in his father's shop, he spent his leisure hours observing nature and the mysteries of astronomy; upon attaining his majority, he walked to Winchester, Virginia and began plying his trade until he built up his resources. He moved to Wytheville, Virginia, in 1791.

He worked at his trade, all the while he attained a reputation for quick wit and immense intellect. Finally, he was received as a student into the office of Alexander Smyth, Esq. an eminent lawyer in that part of the state, and afterwards commander of the northern army during the War of 1812. He was admitted to the bar July 1, 1802, and commenced the practice of his profession in Wytheville. He moved to Staunton, Virginia where he continued the practice of law. He served as member of the Virginia State House of Delegates 1800–1804. He served in the Virginia State senate, 1804–1808.

Sheffey was elected as a Federalist to the Eleventh and to the three succeeding Congresses (March 4, 1809 – March 3, 1817). On January 30, 1812, he married Maria Hanson, the daughter of Lt. Col. Samuel Hanson of Mulberry Grove, Maryland and great-niece to John Hanson, President of the Continental Congress. In 1814, Sheffey was elected a member of the American Antiquarian Society. He was again a member of the Virginia State House of Delegates in 1822 and 1823.

He died at the Warm Springs, Virginia on December 3, 1830, while on his way from Greenbrier Chancery Court to his home in Staunton, Virginia. He was buried in the churchyard at Trinity Episcopal Church (Staunton, Virginia).

== Electoral history ==
- 1809; Sheffey was elected to the U.S. House of Representatives with 66.56% of the vote, defeating Democrat Republican Francis Preston.
- 1811; Sheffey was re-elected unopposed.
- 1813; Sheffey was re-elected unopposed.
- 1815; Sheffey was re-elected unopposed.

== Sources ==
- United States Congress. "Daniel Sheffey (id: S000317)". Biographical Directory of the United States Congress.
- Southern Literary Messenger, Vol. 4, p. 346, Thom. W. White, Publisher & Proprietor, Richmond, Virginia, June 1838

U.S. House of Representatives
Preceded by Abram Trigg	Member of the U.S. House of Representatives from Virginia's 6th congressional district 1809–1817	Succeeded by Alexander Smyth
