= Northwood Middle School =

Northwood Middle School may refer to:

- Northwood Middle School (Arkansas), in North Little Rock, Arkansas
- Northwood Middle School (Illinois), in Woodstock, Illinois
- Northwood Middle School, in Fort Wayne, Indiana
- Northwood Middle School, in Elyria City School District in Elyria, Ohio
- Northwood Middle School, in Northwood Local School District in Northwood, Ohio
- Northwood Middle School, in Greenville County School District in Taylors, South Carolina
- Northwood High School (Saltville, Virginia), in Saltville, Virginia
- Northwood Middle School, in Kent School District in Renton, Washington
- Northwood Middle School (Spokane, Washington), in Spokane, Washington
