= Scott–Walker House =

Historic house in Virginia, United States

- U.S. National Register of Historic Places
- Virginia Landmarks Register
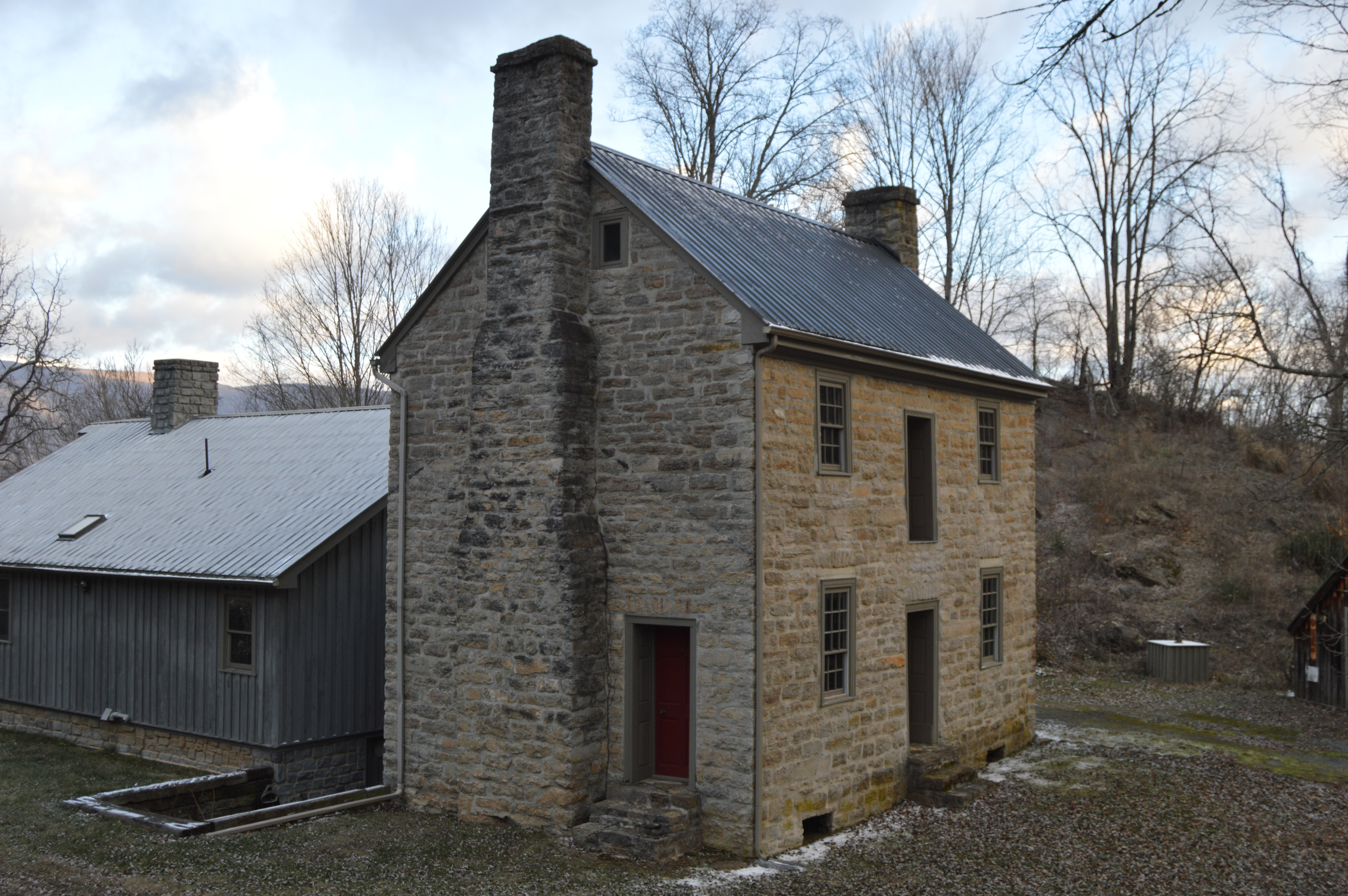
- Front and southwestern side

- Location within Virginia Location within the United States
- Location: VA 635 E side, 2 mi. SE of Saltville, near Saltville, Virginia
- Coordinates: 36°53′1″N 81°43′22″W
- Area: 1 acre (0.40 ha)
- Built: c. 1800
- Architectural style: Hall and parlor
- NRHP reference No.: 94000450
- VLR No.: 086-0026

Significant dates
- Added to NRHP: May 19, 1994
- Designated VLR: March 10, 1994

The Scott–Walker House is a historic home located near Saltville, Smyth County, Virginia. It was built about 1800, and is a two-story, three-bay, limestone dwelling with a hall-parlor-plan on each floor. It has a side gable roof and exterior end chimneys. A one-story, three room wing was added in 1992 and garage in 1993. It is the oldest known stone farmhouse in Smyth County.

It was listed on the National Register of Historic Places in 1994.
