= Francis Preston =

American politician

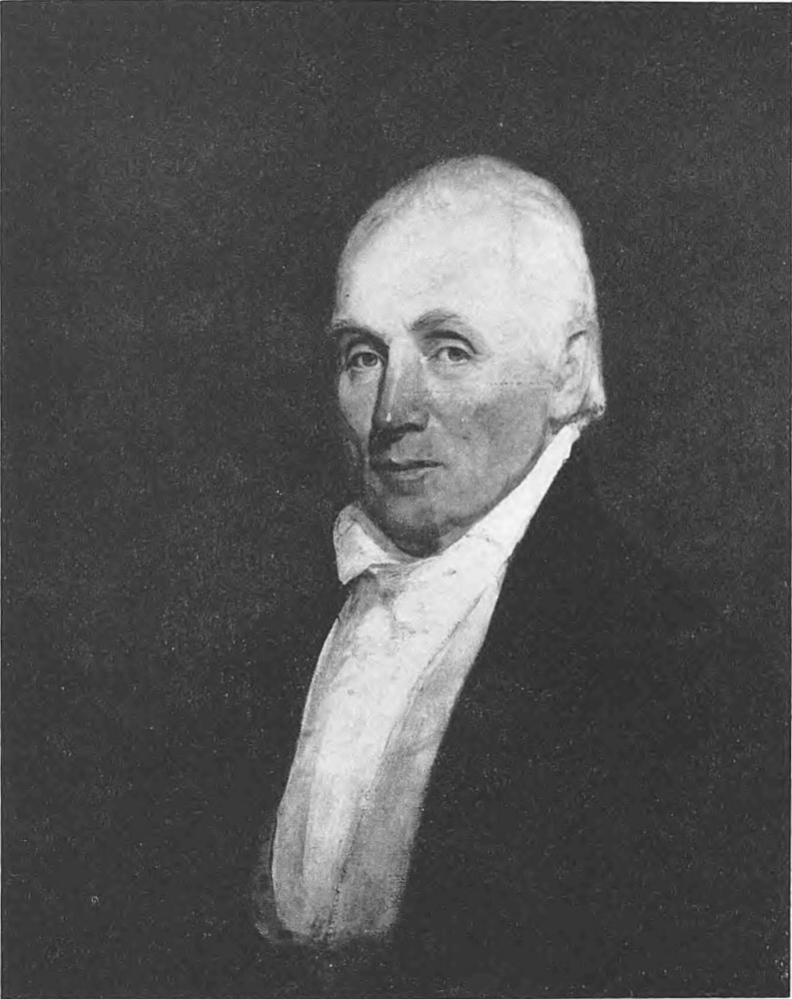
- portrait by Matthew Harris Jouett

Member of the Virginia Senate from Botetourt, Cabell, Giles, Grayson, Greenbrier, Kanawha, Lee, Mason Monroe, Montgomery, Russell, Scott, Tazewell, Washington and Wythe Counties
- In office 1816–1819
- Preceded by: Henley Chapman
- Succeeded by: District abolished

Member of the Virginia House of Delegates from Washington County
- In office 1812–1813; Alongside Reuben Bradley

Member of the Virginia House of Delegates from Montgomery County
- In office 1788–1789; Alongside Daniel Trigg, Walter Crockett

Member of the U.S. House of Representatives from Virginia's 4th district
- In office March 4, 1793 – March 3, 1797
- Preceded by: Richard Bland Lee
- Succeeded by: Abram Trigg

Personal details
- Born: August 2, 1765 Greenfield, Virginia
- Died: May 26, 1835 (aged 69) Columbia, South Carolina
- Resting place: Seven Mile Ford, Virginia
- Party: Anti-Administration until 1795
- Other political affiliations: Democratic-Republican after 1795
- Education: The College of William and Mary

Military service
- Branch/service: Virginia state militia
- Rank: Colonel
- Battles/wars: War of 1812

Francis Preston (August 2, 1765 – May 26, 1835) was an American lawyer and politician from Abingdon, Virginia. He was the son of Col. William Preston of Virginia, served in both houses of the state legislature, and represented Virginia in the U.S. House of Representatives from 1793 to 1797. Preston had a house built in Abingdon, now called the Martha Washington Inn. In 1795, while residing at Saltville, he constructed the Preston House.

Preston was the father of Isaac Trimble Preston, William Campbell Preston, and John S. Preston and the uncle of William Ballard and William Preston. His daughter Sarah (Sally) Buchanan Preston (1802–1879) married her cousin Virginia Governor John B. Floyd.

== Electoral history ==
- 1793; Preston was elected to the U.S. House of Representatives defeating Abram Trigg.
- 1795; Preston was re-elected unopposed.

U.S. House of Representatives
| Preceded by Richard Bland Lee | Member of the U.S. House of Representatives from Virginia's 4th congressional district 1793–1797 | Succeeded by Abram Trigg |
