= Preston House (Saltville, Virginia) =

Historic house in Virginia, United States

- U.S. National Register of Historic Places
- Virginia Landmarks Register
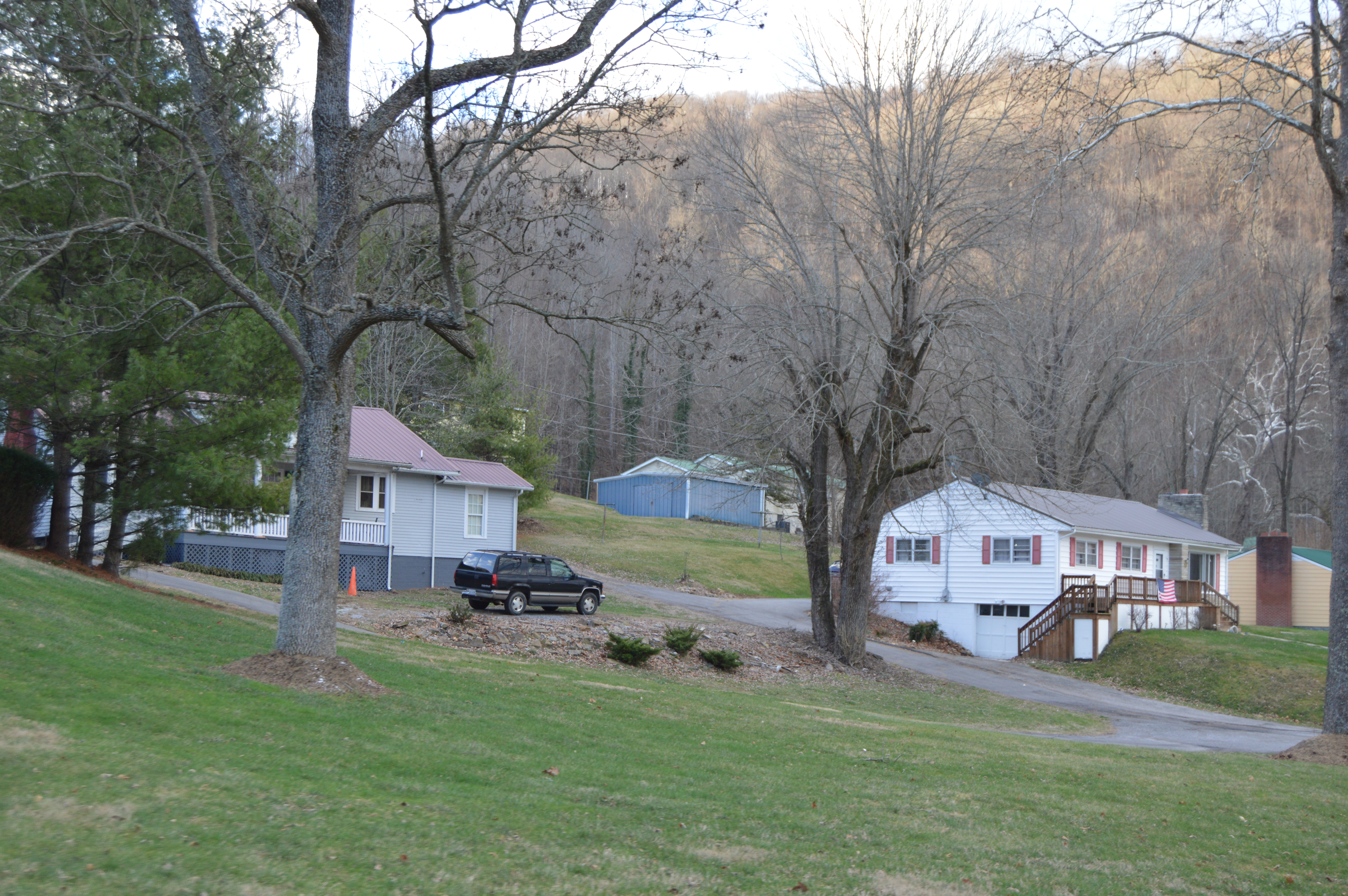
- Site of the house

- Location within Virginia Location within the United States
- Location: VA 107, Saltville, Virginia
- Coordinates: 36°52′15″N 81°45′43″W
- Area: 1 acre (0.40 ha)
- Built: c. 1795
- Built by: Irby, Francis; Dungan, Jesse
- NRHP reference No.: 76002120
- VLR No.: 086-0006

Significant dates
- Added to NRHP: July 30, 1976
- Designated VLR

The Preston House, also known as the Palmer House, was a historic home located at Saltville, Smyth County, Virginia. The original section was built about 1795. It was a two-story, gable-roofed, double-pile frame structure covered with beaded weatherboard. It consisted of a two-story, five bay center section flanked by later, and lower, two-story, three bay flanking wings. The house was built by lawyer and politician Francis Preston (1765–1836), whose family owned the salt works. The house was destroyed in 1978.

It was listed on the National Register of Historic Places in 1976.
