= Saltville Battlefields Historic District =

Archaeological site in Virginia, United States

- U.S. National Register of Historic Places
- U.S. Historic district
- Virginia Landmarks Register
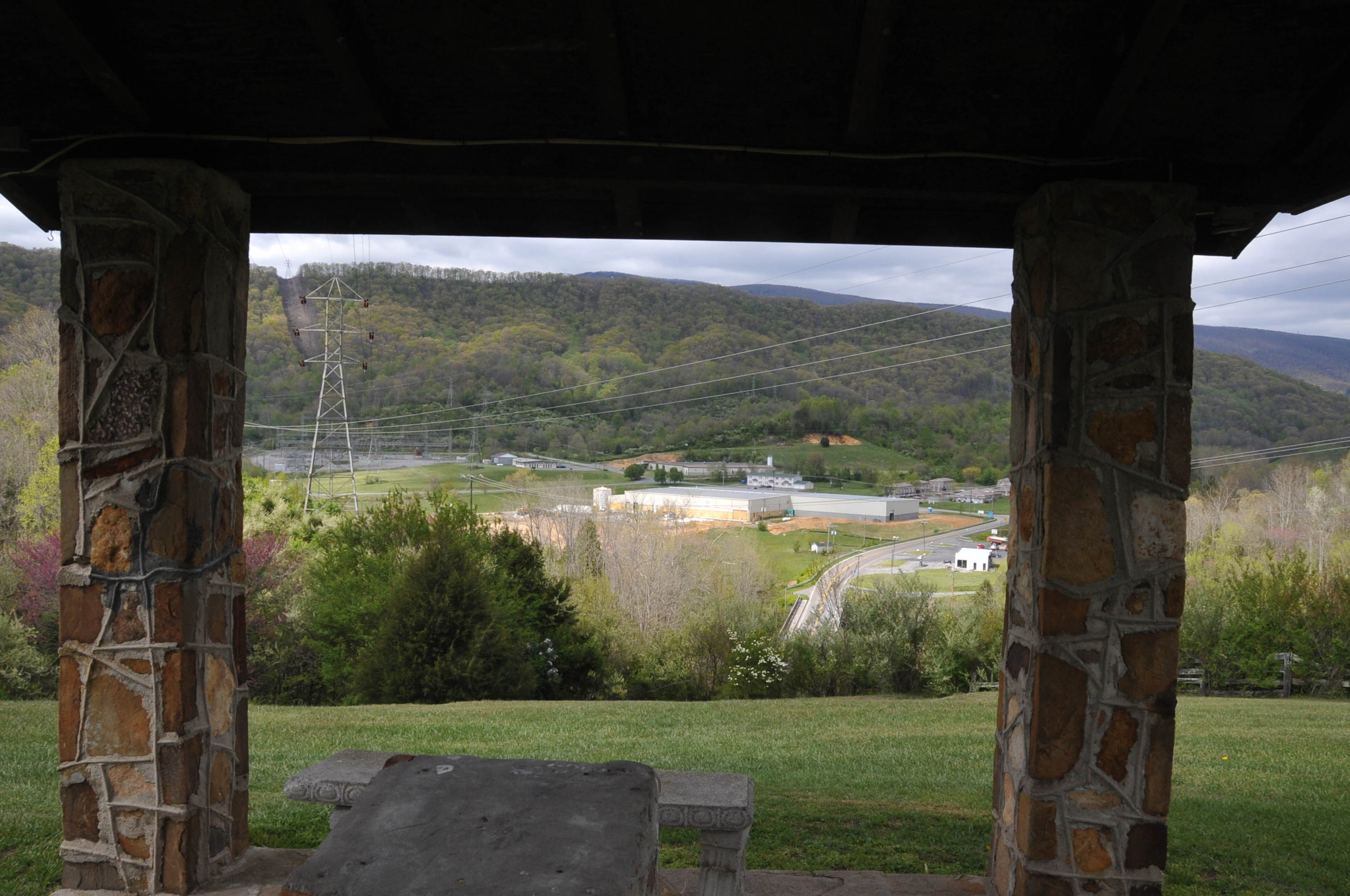
- Saltville Battlefields Historic District, April 2012

- Location within Virginia Location within the United States
- Location: SR 91, SR 107, CR 632, Saltville, Virginia
- Coordinates: 36°52′32″N 81°45′55″W
- Area: 2,737 acres (1,108 ha)
- Built: 1864
- Architect: Poor, R.L.
- Architectural style: Late Victorian, Late 19th And 20th Century Revivals
- NRHP reference No.: 10000096
- VLR No.: 295-5001

Significant dates
- Added to NRHP: March 25, 2010
- Designated VLR: December 17, 2009

Saltville Battlefields Historic District is a historic American Civil War battlefield and national historic district located around Saltville, in Smyth County and Washington County, Virginia. The district includes 3 contributing buildings, 31 contributing sites, 4 contributing structures, and 1 contributing object near Saltville. It encompasses the core areas of two battles, fought on October 2 and December 20, 1864, known as the Battle of Saltville I and Battle of Saltville II, where Confederate and Union forces contested control of the South's most important salt production facilities. Notable resources include the sites of salt furnaces, Well Fields, Fort Statham, Lover's Leap Defenses, Saltville Gap Overlooks, Mill Cliff gun emplacements, Fort Breckinridge, Fort Hatton, Sanders’ House/Williams Site Battlefield/field hospital, William A. Stuart House, and the Elizabeth Cemetery.

It was listed on the National Register of Historic Places in 2010.
