= Abram Trigg =

18th-century American politician

Member of the U.S. House of Representatives from Virginia's 6th district
- In office March 4, 1803 – March 3, 1809
- Preceded by: Matthew Clay
- Succeeded by: Daniel Sheffey

Member of the U.S. House of Representatives from Virginia's 4th district
- In office March 4, 1797 – March 3, 1803
- Preceded by: Francis Preston
- Succeeded by: David Holmes

Personal details
- Born: 1750 New London, Virginia
- Died: Unknown "Buchanan's Bottom", Montgomery County, Virginia
- Resting place: "Buchanan’s Bottom", Montgomery County, Virginia
- Party: Democratic-Republican

Military service
- Branch/service: Virginia state militia
- Rank: General
- Battles/wars: American Revolutionary War

Abram Trigg (1750 – unknown) was an American planter, lawyer and politician who represented Montgomery County, Virginia in the Virginia Ratifying Convention and U.S. House of Representatives (1797-1809) after fighting with the Virginia militia in the Revolutionary War.

== Early life and education ==
Abram Trigg was born on his father's farm near New London in then vast Lunenberg County in what was then the Colony of Virginia. That particular area became Bedford County in 1754. His grandfather of the same name had emigrated from Cornwall, England about 1710, and his father, William Trigg (1716–1773), served as a judge in Bedford County for many years. His mother, the former Mary Johns Trigg (1720–1773), bore eight children during that marriage. His brother, John, would serve with him in Congress. Another brother, Stephen Trigg, had been a member of a land commission in Kentucky in 1779, and died commanding a regiment at the Battle of Blue Licks. Another brother, William Trigg, had descendants including Congressman Connally Findlay Trigg and Richmond shipbuilder William Robertson Trigg.

== Career ==
Trigg was admitted to the bar and began his legal career in then-vast Montgomery County, Virginia. He lived on his estate, "Buchanan's Bottom", on the New River and held local offices, such as clerk and judge, and various other offices in Montgomery County.. He served in the Revolutionary War as lieutenant colonel of militia in 1782 and later as general of militia in Virginia.

Trigg was a delegate to the Virginia ratification convention of 1788, and voted with Patrick Henry and the Anti-federalists against ratification of the United States Constitution. He was elected as a Republican to the Fifth and to the five succeeding Congresses (March 4, 1797 – March 3, 1809). He died and was buried on the family estate, death date unknown.

Like his father, brothers and others of his class, Trigg farmed using enslaved labor. According to the 1787 Virginia Tax census, he owned five slaves, six horses and 20 cattle in Montgomery County, slightly fewer than did Daniel Trigg, possibly a relative and who served several terms in the Virginia House of Delegates.

== Personal life ==
In 1779 Abram married Susannah Ingles, daughter of William Ingles and Mary Draper Ingles, who escaped from Indian captivity and walked 800 miles to return to her home in 1755. The couple had ten children.

== Electoral history ==
- 1797; Trigg was elected to the U.S. House of Representatives unopposed.
- 1799; Trigg was re-elected with 88.47% of the vote, defeating Federalist William Preston.
- 1801; Trigg was re-elected unopposed.
- 1803; Trigg was re-elected unopposed.
- 1805; Trigg was re-elected unopposed.
- 1807; Trigg was re-elected defeating Federalist Daniel Sheffey.

U.S. House of Representatives
Preceded by Francis Preston	Member of the U.S. House of Representatives from Virginia's 4th congressional district 1797–1803	Succeeded by David Holmes
Preceded by Matthew Clay	Member of the U.S. House of Representatives from Virginia's 6th congressional district 1803–1809	Succeeded by Daniel Sheffey
