= Hobart Smith =

American Musician (1897–1965)

- Born: Hobart Smith; May 10, 1897; Smyth County, Virginia, U.S.
- Died: January 11, 1965 (aged 67) Saltville, Virginia
- Genre: Old-time
- Instruments: banjo, guitar, fiddle, piano
- Years active: c. 1942–1965
- Labels: The Library of Congress; Folk-Legacy

Hobart Smith (May 10, 1897—January 11, 1965) was an American old-time musician. He was most notable for his appearance with his sister Texas Gladden on a series of Library of Congress recordings in the 1940s and his later appearances at various festivals during the folk music revival of the 1960s. Smith is often remembered for his virtuosic performances on the banjo, and had also mastered various other instruments, including the fiddle, guitar, piano, harmonica, accordion and organ.

== Biography ==
=== Early life ===
Hobart Smith was born near Saltville, Virginia in 1897, the oldest son of eight children born to Louvine and Alexander King Smith. Hobart believed the ballad-singing tradition in his family dated back at least seven generations to when the Smiths immigrated from England. Both of Hobart's grandfathers were fiddle players, and his parents were banjo players. When Alan Lomax traveled to Saltville to record Hobart in 1942, he also recorded Hobart's father playing a version of "Old Joe Clark". Hobart recalled his family staying up late at night singing hymns and ballads around the fireplace in their home just outside Saltville. Hobart's parents bought him his first banjo when was seven, and he learned piano by playing at church revivals in the area.

In 1911, an African-American fiddle player named Jim Spencer began lodging at the Smith house, and taught Hobart how to play the fiddle. Impressed with the African-American style, Hobart and his cousin, John Galliher, began sneaking over to the segregated side of Saltville to hear black musicians. In later interviews, both claimed to have heard an itinerant guitarist named "Blind Lemon Jefferson" (modern researchers doubt this was the legendary Texas bluesman, however), who inspired Smith to purchase a guitar and learn to play that instrument as well. Around the same time, a neighbor of Smith's named John Greer taught Smith a "double-noting" banjo style he had learned from African-American musicians, which Smith later used to complement the frailing style taught to him by his father.

=== Recording career ===
Around 1915, Smith formed a string band and began performing at minstrel shows and medicine shows, and over subsequent years performed at venues around western Virginia, especially in the Abingdon area and at Emory & Henry College. In 1936, Smith and his sister, Texas Gladden, delivered a memorable performance at the White Top Folk Festival in southwestern Virginia. The performance impressed Eleanor Roosevelt, who was in attendance, and two years later she invited Smith and Gladden to perform at the White House. These early appearances brought them to the attention of various folklorists and musicologists, including Alan Lomax, who at the time was working for the U.S. Library of Congress.

In 1942, Smith recorded 40 tracks for Lomax at Saltville, among them "Banging Breakdown", Cuckoo Bird, "Wayfaring Stranger", and "Sourwood Mountain". Lomax introduced Smith to Moses Asch, and in 1946 Smith traveled to New York to record for Asch's Disc label. Both Lomax and Asch continued to record Smith over the years, sometimes as a soloist, and sometimes performing duets with his sister or other singers such as Almeda Riddle and Bessie Jones.

Smith experienced a resurgence during the folk music revival of the 1960s. He made numerous appearances at folk festivals around the United States, most notably at the Newport Folk Festival in 1964. He played in several different bands with other noted musicians, including Clarence Ashley, whom he had met at a medicine show in the 1930s. In October 1963, Smith participated in two notable recording sessions, both in Chicago. The first was conducted by Chicago radio station WFMT program director, Norm Pellegrini, which consisted of material subsequently released on the Folk-Legacy label. A second, less formal session was conducted by folk music teacher Fleming Brown at Brown's home, parts of which were released in 2005 by Smithsonian Folkways. At both recordings, Smith was already feeling the painful effects of a heart embolism that would take his life on January 11, 1965.

== Repertoire ==
Hobart Smith was a banjo virtuoso who had mastered both the "frailing" or "clawhammer" style taught to him by his father and the "double-noting" style, which was taught to him by John Greer and was heavily rooted in the instrument's African-American tradition. His notable banjo recordings include Cuckoo Bird and "Banging Breakdown" (the latter being a favorite at festivals), both of which he learned from neighbor and bandmate John Greer, and "Old Joe Clark" and "John Henry", both of which he learned from his father. While Smith was a Baptist, most of his religious recordings are from the Holiness tradition, since Baptists at the time frowned upon instrumental music. Smith learned "Heaven's Airplane"— recorded in 1963— from a Holiness preacher.

== Legacy and influence ==
Hobart Smith’s music left a lasting mark on both old-time musicians and scholars of Appalachian culture. His 1940s field recordings with Alan Lomax for the Library of Congress helped preserve traditional banjo, fiddle, and guitar styles that might have otherwise been lost. During the folk revival of the 1960s, Smith’s performances at festivals such as the Newport Folk Festival introduced new audiences to mountain music and inspired a generation of revival musicians. Known for blending clawhammer and “double-noting” banjo techniques, he bridged musical traditions that crossed racial and regional lines. Modern folk and bluegrass players still study his recordings for their technical precision and expressive energy, and his work continues to appear in collections like In Sacred Trust: The 1963 Fleming Brown Tapes and Blue Ridge Legacy. Today, music historians recognize Smith as a key link between the early roots of Appalachian string music and its revival in the twentieth century.

== Discography ==
- Folk Music of the United States: Album 7- Anglo-American Ballads From the Archive of American Folk Song (w/ The Library of Congress, Justin Begley, Texas Gladden, Horton Barker, Lena Bare Turbyfill, and I. G. Greer) (The Library Of Congress, 1943)
- Of Saltville, Virginia (Folk-Legacy, 1964)

Compilations

- Blue Ridge Legacy (Rounder 11661-1799-2, 2001)
- In Sacred Trust: The 1963 Fleming Brown Tapes (Smithsonian Folkways 40141, 59628AM, 2005)
