= Texas Gladden =

American singer

Texas Anna Gladden (née Smith, March 14, 1895 – May 23, 1966) was an American folk singer, best known for her traditional Appalachian ballad style of singing, which she began to record in the 1930s.

== Life ==
She was born Texas Anna Smith, in Rich Valley, Smyth County, Virginia, the daughter of Alexander King Smith and his wife Sarah Louvenia (née Hammonds); the name Texas was taken from that of an aunt. She married Jim Gladden in 1912 at the age of seventeen. In 1930, the couple lived in Salem, Virginia with their seven children (she had nine in all); Jim worked as a laborer.

She started to gain a public audience through singing at the White Top Festival in Smyth County in the mid-1930s, and also gained recognition by singing at events at the old Fort Lewis School as well as making some early recordings for the Virginia Folklore Society. In September 1941, along with her brother, musician Hobart Smith, she began to record with pioneer folk archivist and musicologist Alan Lomax. The largest collection of her work, which includes 37 tracks of songs and interviews, is compiled on the album Texas Gladden: Ballad Legacy, which Lomax produced as part of his Southern Journey series. This album contains traditional ballads of Anglo-Saxon/Celtic origin, such as "Barbara Allen", "Mary Hamilton", and "Lord Thomas", as well as regional songs lullabies like "Hush, Baby, Don’t You Cry", and even a Civil War-era ghost story. The album was reissued on CD by Rounder Records in 2001.

Her granddaughter, Cindy Gladden, stated; "Granny always said that these songs should be sung by an uneducated voice as the ballads themselves were uneducated." Texas Gladden organized these songs through the use of unique phrasings and "grace notes" which her mother taught her, and defined them as "unanticipated bends on certain notes".

Texas Gladden died in hospital in Roanoke, Virginia, in 1966, and is buried at Salem. She did not enjoy much fame during her life and has remained a relatively obscure artist. Her work experienced a resurgence in popularity during the 1960s as she was referenced by Joan Baez. More recently her singing has been rediscovered through harpist Joanna Newsom's recording of the traditional Appalachian style song "Three Little Babes", recorded by Gladden as "The Three Babies".
