= Way of the Morris =

2011 documentary film

- Directed by: Rob Curry; Tim Plester
- Written by: Tim Plester
- Release date: 2011
- Running time: 64 minutes
- Country: United Kingdom
- Language: English

Way of the Morris is a 2011 64-minute documentary about Morris dancing by Tim Plester and Rob Curry.

The film received preview screenings at the Purcell Room in London's Southbank Centre as part of an Arts Council funded festival, "5,000 Morris Dancers." It premiered at the 2011 SXSW Festival in Austin, Texas.

The film was self-released by Fifth Column Films in UK Cinemas in September 2011. Reviews were positive, with a Rotten Tomatoes rating of 100% based on 6 reviews, with an average rating of 6.6/10. It was later broadcast on Sky in the UK and New Zealand. Andrew Pulver of The Guardian called it "undeniably charming."
