= Georgia Blizzard =

American ceramic artist (1919–2002)

- Born: May 7, 1919; Saltville, Virginia, U.S.
- Died: June 2, 2002; Glade Spring, Virginia, U.S.

Georgia Blizzard (May 7, 1919 – June 2, 2002) was an American ceramic artist from Virginia. She was self-taught and her work is in the permanent collections of several American art museums.

== Biography ==
Blizzard was born in Saltville in 1919. She claimed Apache and Irish ancestry. When she was little, she and her family moved to Plum Creek. Her mother taught Blizzard and her sister how to create art using a pit-fire method. During the Great Depression, she left school in order to be part of the National Youth Administration. She worked in a munitions factory in Bristol during World War II and after that, worked at a textile mill in Chilhowie until 1958. Blizzard had contracted black lung and lost one of her lungs. Her husband was crippled in an accident in a coal mine and eventually their marriage failed. Her husband died in 1954. Blizzard developed paranoid schizophrenia after these events and her art helped her deal with visions she saw and the feelings she needed to work through.

She began making art for sale in the late 1950s and sold her pottery in her daughter, Mary's, store. In the early 1980s, her neighbor, Michael Martin, contacted a friend to take some of Blizzard's work to a gallery in Buckhead run by Judith Alexander where Jonathan Williams discovered her work.

Blizzard died in Glade Springs on June 2, 2002.

== Work ==
Blizzard's pottery is hand-built. She used to find the material to create her ceramic art in the creek behind her house in the Appalachian hills. At first, she used a coal kiln built by her neighbor, Michael Martin, but later in life used an electric kiln.

She is a self-taught artist. Her art "expressed her memories, surroundings, and religious views." The work is dark in terms of theme, as Jonathan Williams describes it, "they make you think twice about human despair."

Her work is in the permanent collections of the Smithsonian American Art Museum, the American Folk Art Museum, the Milwaukee Art Museum, the Asheville Art Museum, the High Museum and the Abby Aldrich Rockefeller Museum.
