= Allison Gap, Virginia =

Coordinates: 36°53′39″N 81°46′36″W

Allison Gap
- Census-designated place
- Location within Virginia Location within the United States
- Country: United States
- State: Virginia
- Counties: Smyth

Population (2020)
  - Total: 610
- Time zone: UTC-5 (Eastern (EST))
  - Summer (DST): UTC-4 (EDT)
- Area code: 540

Allison Gap is an unincorporated community and census-designated place in Smyth County, Virginia, United States.

== Climate ==
Climate in this area has mild differences between highs and lows, and there is adequate rainfall year-round. The Köppen Climate Classification subtype for this climate is "Cfb". (Marine West Coast Climate/Oceanic climate).

== Demographics ==
Historical population
Census	Pop.	Note	%±
1950	1,015		—
2020	610		—
U.S. Decennial Census; 1940 1950 1960 1970; 1980 1990 2000 2010

Allison Gap first appeared as an unincorporated community in the 1950 U.S. census. It did not appear in subsequent censuses until it was listed as a census designated place in the 2020 U.S. census.

=== Racial and ethnic composition ===
Allison Gap CDP, Virginia – Racial and ethnic composition Note: the US Census treats Hispanic/Latino as an ethnic category. This table excludes Latinos from the racial categories and assigns them to a separate category. Hispanics/Latinos may be of any race.
Race / Ethnicity (NH = Non-Hispanic)	Pop 2020	2020
White alone (NH)	586	96.07%
Black or African American alone (NH)	0	0.00%
Native American or Alaska Native alone (NH)	0	0.00%
Asian alone (NH)	1	0.16%
Native Hawaiian or Pacific Islander alone (NH)	0	0.00%
Other race alone (NH)	0	0.00%
Mixed race or Multiracial (NH)	14	2.30%
Hispanic or Latino (any race)	9	1.48%
Total	610	100.00%
