= Saltville (archaeological site) =

Saltville Archaeological Site SV-2 is an apparent pre-Clovis archaeological and paleontological site located in the Saltville Valley near Saltville, Virginia. The site was excavated from 1992 to 1997 by paleogeographer Jerry N. McDonald of the Virginia Museum of Natural History.

The Saltville Valley today is located in the valley and ridge province of the Appalachian Mountains in southwest Virginia. The valley is shaped like a scalene triangle, and it measures in elevation 1740’/530 m above sea level, 8000’/2.4 km lengthwise, and 2750’/0.84 km at its greatest width. Over 20 percent of the valley is submerged in standing water due to industrial mining of salt brine from the late 19th century to the early 20th century. Site SV-2 is located in the south western part of the Saltville Valley by the northern edge of an artificial reservoir established by the Olin Mathieson Chemical Corporation from 1964-1965.

== Background ==
The southern and eastern boundaries of the Saltville Valley are located near the Saltville Thrust Fault, and the northwestern areas are bordered by the Upper Mississippian Little Valley, Hillsdale, and Ste. Genevieve/Gasper limestones. The valley rests on the Upper Mississippian Maccrady Formation, an erratic sequence of shales, siltstones, and minor sandstones that possesses limestones that integrate considerable amounts of gypsum, anhydrite, and halite. Prior to 13,500 RCYBP in late Pleistocene times, the valley contained a river which subsequently transformed into a lake. This phenomenon sealed the bottom of the valley with mud and produced environmental conditions conducive to the preservation of late glacial fauna and flora. The lake has been dubbed Lake Totten, after local amateur historian Charlie Bill Totten, and was created as a result of an increased flow volume from the lower part of the Saltville River that previously ran through the valley. Explanations for this include increased rain, and the upper Saltville River being pirated by the lower McHenry Creek. The subsequent blockage of the Saltville gap emptied the Saltville River into the North Fork of the Holston River. After the formation of Lake Totten, colluvial sediments intensively flowed periodically into the shallow water north of the site, and eventually the reduction of the lake exposed lacustrine mud. This accounts for a one-meter thick alluvial, colluvial, and lacustrine sediments overlying a pedestal of bedrock spanning 5,000 years from 14,510 to 13,000 RCYBP in the late Pleistocene.

== Major faunal discoveries ==
Striking fossilized specimens of various megafauna have been uncovered in the Saltville Valley for a little over two centuries. Fossils were first reported by Arthur Campbell in a letter to Thomas Jefferson in 1782. Noteworthy discoveries appearing in the valley include megafauna such as Thomas Jefferson’s giant ground sloth (Megalonyx jeffersonii), woolly mammoth (Mammuthus primigenius), muskox (Bootherium sp.), American mastodon (Mammut americanum), horse (Equus sp.), a possible elk moose (cf. Cervalces), and a giant short-faced bear (Arctodus simus).

Fossilized mastodon remains of a single individual were found at SV-2 that may have been killed, butchered, and cooked, indicating possible pre-Clovis activity in the Saltville Valley.

Muskoxen were discovered in the Saltville Valley by Clayton E. Ray during joint salvage test excavations held from 1966 through 1967 by the Smithsonian and Virginia Polytechnic Institute. In 1978, the remains of thirty-four fossilized muskoxen were discovered by C.S. Bartlett Jr. in a salvage excavation. The spring of 1980, Jerry McDonald discovered the third most complete musk oxen skeleton ever found with a total of 49 bones circa 1983.

The fossilized canine of a giant short-faced bear (Arctodus simus) was discovered in 1999, and a dentary (lower jaw bone) was found nearby a year later. These are the only known carnivorous megafauna that have been found in the Saltville Valley. AMS radiocarbon dates were taken from a sample of preserved collagen and produced a date of 14,853 + 55 RCYBP for the fossil. This is the only specimen of giant short-faced bear found in the Appalachian Highlands.

Mammoth remains are currently being excavated as of 2009. A set of complete ribs, vertebrae, a scapula, and tarsals have been found to date. A left astragalus, left calcaneus, and an undistinguished partial carpal or tarsal exhibit postmortem alterations that may represent carnivorous scavenging by either a dire wolf (Aenocyon dirus), giant short-faced bear (Arctodus simus), or an American lion (Panthera atrox). The collagen taken from the mammoth yielded an age of 14,510 + 55 RCYBP. It was determined that the remains were scavenged.

== Major floral discoveries ==
In 1967, samples gathered from the endocranial cavity of a muskox yielded pollen that demonstrated the Saltville Valley contained a spruce parkland with ponds, marshes, and prairies. Additional knowledge about the environment was revealed by a sediment sample reported by H. R. Delcourt and P.A. Delcourt in 1986 which displayed mixed forest with boreal conifers and hardwoods. The bottom land was characterized by spruce, fir, grasses, shrubs, herbs, and sedges that display boreal woodland marshes. The most recent study of the valley published in 2007, examined megafaunal herbivores for their trophic relationships. The carbon nitrogen isotope ratios from preserved bone collagen and other fossilized organic matter indicated C-4 plants and grasses were absent in the bottomlands of the valley, with C-3 vegetation dominant.

== Stratigraphy ==
There are seven stratigraphic levels present within the Saltville Valley in archaeological context. The first two are H-1 through H-2, and represent the historic periods through the early, middle, and late Holocene. At site SV-2 H-1 is not present since it was removed by bulldozers in 1964-1965. The next 4 levels are labeled W-1 through W-4. W-1 represents the transition from late Wisconsinan to Holocene period, and the subsequent W levels display the rest of the late Wisconsinan. P-1, the last level exhibits the Upper Mississippian Maccrady Formation.

== SV-2 and pre-Clovis activity ==
Evidence of pre-Clovis activity was found at the SV-2 site. There are three archaeological horizons evident of human occupation located within a one-meter thick alluvial, colluvial, and lacustrine sediments overlying a pedestal of bedrock. These are dated within 14,510, and 13,500-13,000 RCYBP. The oldest horizon is dated to 14,510 + 80 RCYBP (Beta-117541) by the presence of a tibia bone tool from a muskox that was AMS radiocarbon dated. Evidence for the butchering/cooking of a mastodon was found in this level. It is believed that one individual was represented. Seven complete or partial ribs, two fragments of limb bones, one tooth, and nine pieces of tusk all display similar surface characteristics lacking signs of fluvial abrasion or extensive subaerial weathering. Evidence that this mastodon was processed and cooked includes the presence of two sandstone knives with worked edges that were used to cut meat and/or remove hide. A concretion representing a congealed mass of viscous fluid replaced by minerals may represent fat drippings produced by cooking with fire. Fire cracked rocks and a burned mastodon tooth were also found. Also associated were a triangular stone used as a hand held ax or wedge, a piece of exotic chert used as wedge chert flake, and two pieces of bone modified by human agency. The first of these is an incised basicranial complex of a midsized herbivore, and possible tibia bone tool AMS dated to 14, 510 RCYBP, which suggests a pre-Clovis occupation. It was from the shaft of a right tibia of what was assumed to be a midsized adult musk-ox since it was too gracile to belong to a bison with identification also based on surface details, absolute size, elongate shape, and the presence of other musk-oxen bone and teeth. It measured 195.2 mm in length, 48.9mm in maximum width across the proximal end of the medial surface, 36 mm in peak width in transverse (medial-lateral) section. The tibia bone exhibits three pairs of parallel fractures, two percussion fracture cones in the medullary cavity, and extensive non-random patterned wear. The fractures could have either occurred with one or numerous blow with the goal of obtaining marrow. The wear pattern indicates that the bone tool was used as a scraper or flesher, and might have been used as a meat or hide splitter.

The middle horizon contains two features in a fluvial sand lens. The first has a collection of lithics that are either stone tools, byproducts of stone tools, or material with the potential to be made into stone tools. Also present were fish bones, a piece of charcoal, and 12 pieces of microdebitage of which three show signs that bifacial retouch occurred. The second feature contained seven concretions. Five of these were elongated, and one was prismatic. These were found in maroon mud, but were grey bodied, indicating they originated in a different sedimentary environment. All pieces found originated as congealed viscous body fat, but were replaced by minerals from ground water. Twigs were found in the sand lens that provided a date of 13,950 + 70 RCYBP Beta (65209).

The youngest horizon contained one feature that contained 200 immature individuals of the giant floater (Pyganodon grandis), a mussel which usually lives in impoundments or slow moving streams beneath mud. Fish and amphibian vertebrae were uncovered with charcoal, lithic debris, and 125 possible pieces of foreign microdebitage that yield a small number of pieces connected to bifacial retouching. This feature is thought to date from 13,500 to 13,000 RCYBP because of interpretive information about the deposit’s creation.
