= Saltville Historic District =

Historic district in Virginia, United States

- U.S. National Register of Historic Places
- U.S. Historic district
- Virginia Landmarks Register
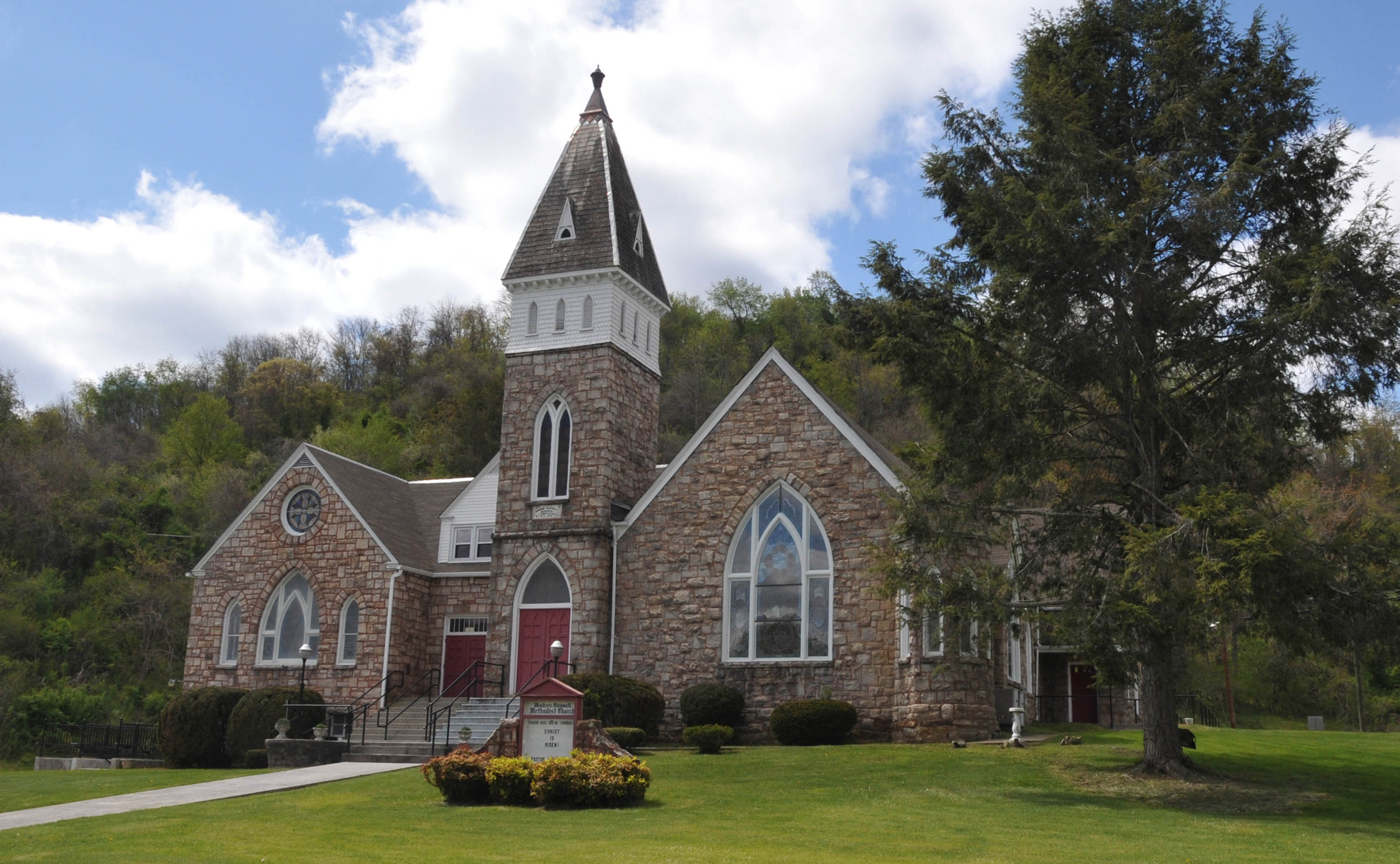
- Madam Russell Memorial Methodist Church, April 2012

- Location within Virginia Location within the United States
- Location: Main St., 1st Ave., Palmer Ave, Palmer Ln., Stadium Dr., and Henrytown Rd., Saltville, Virginia
- Coordinates: 36°52′32″N 81°45′55″W
- Area: 187 acres (76 ha)
- Built: 1896
- Architect: Chequior, T. Buckler
- Architectural style: Classical Revival, Gothic Revival
- NRHP reference No.: 02000367
- VLR No.: 295-0001

Significant dates
- Added to NRHP: April 12, 2002
- Designated VLR: September 13, 2000

Saltville Historic District is a national historic district located at Saltville, Smyth County, Virginia. The district includes 104 contributing buildings and 3 contributing sites in the central business district and surrounding residential areas of Saltville. It includes a variety of residential and commercial buildings primarily dating from the late-19th to mid-20th centuries. Notable buildings and sites include Well Fields, Saltville Golf Course, Office Building (1850), Mathieson Alkali Office Building (1894), company store (1895), First National Bank of Saltville, St. Paul's Episcopal Church (1896), Gothic Revival style Madam Russell Memorial United Methodist Church, Duplex House (1894), Saltville Post Office (1931), Piggly-Wiggly Store, Saltville Savings Bank (1920), and Saltville Town Hall (1949).

It was listed on the National Register of Historic Places in 2000.
