= The Ballad of Shirley Collins =

- Directed by: Rob Curry, Tim Plester
- Produced by: Paul Williams
- Narrated by: Hannah Arterton
- Cinematography: Richard Mitchell
- Music by: Ossian Brown and Michael J York,
- Production company: Fire Films
- Release date: 2017
- Running time: 94 minutes
- Country: United Kingdom
- Language: English

The Ballad of Shirley Collins is a 2017 British feature documentary directed by Rob Curry and Tim Plester.

The film follows the return of 80 year old folk singer Shirley Collins to the limelight as she records Lodestar, her first album for 37 years, juxtaposing this with the noted 'Southern Journey' song-collecting trip Collins undertook in 1959 with noted ethnomusicologist Alan Lomax. The music recorded on the trip received renewed attention in 2000 with the release of the Coen Brothers' O Brother Where Art Thou, the soundtrack of which was built around the music archive from the trip.

The film premiered at the BFI London Film Festival in October 2017, before a UK theatrical release the same month. Its international premiere was at the Rotterdam International Film Festival in March 2018, followed by screenings including CPH:DOX and Revelation Perth. The film was launched in the US with screenings at the Virginia Film Festival and Library of Congress, and received a small 20 screen US release on 2 November 2018. An event tour following the route of Alan Lomax and Shirley Collins' Southern Journey song-collecting trip accompanied the release. The tour featured bands including Anna and Elizabeth, The Local Honeys, Petunia, Sam Gleaves and Ned Oldham.

Gleaves and Oldham had previously contributed songs to a Shirley Collins tribute compilation that was put together by producer Paul Williams in 2014 to support a crowdfunding campaign for the film. This was later released as the triple LP and CD Shirley Inspired by Fire Records in 2015. The compilation featured more than 30 artists, including Ned Oldham's brother Bonnie Prince Billy, singer-songwriter Angel Olsen, Norwegian black metal band Ulver and members of the Mekons and Adam and the Ants, reflecting the diversity of artists outside the folk world who Collins music appeals to.
