= Saltville, Virginia =

- Town
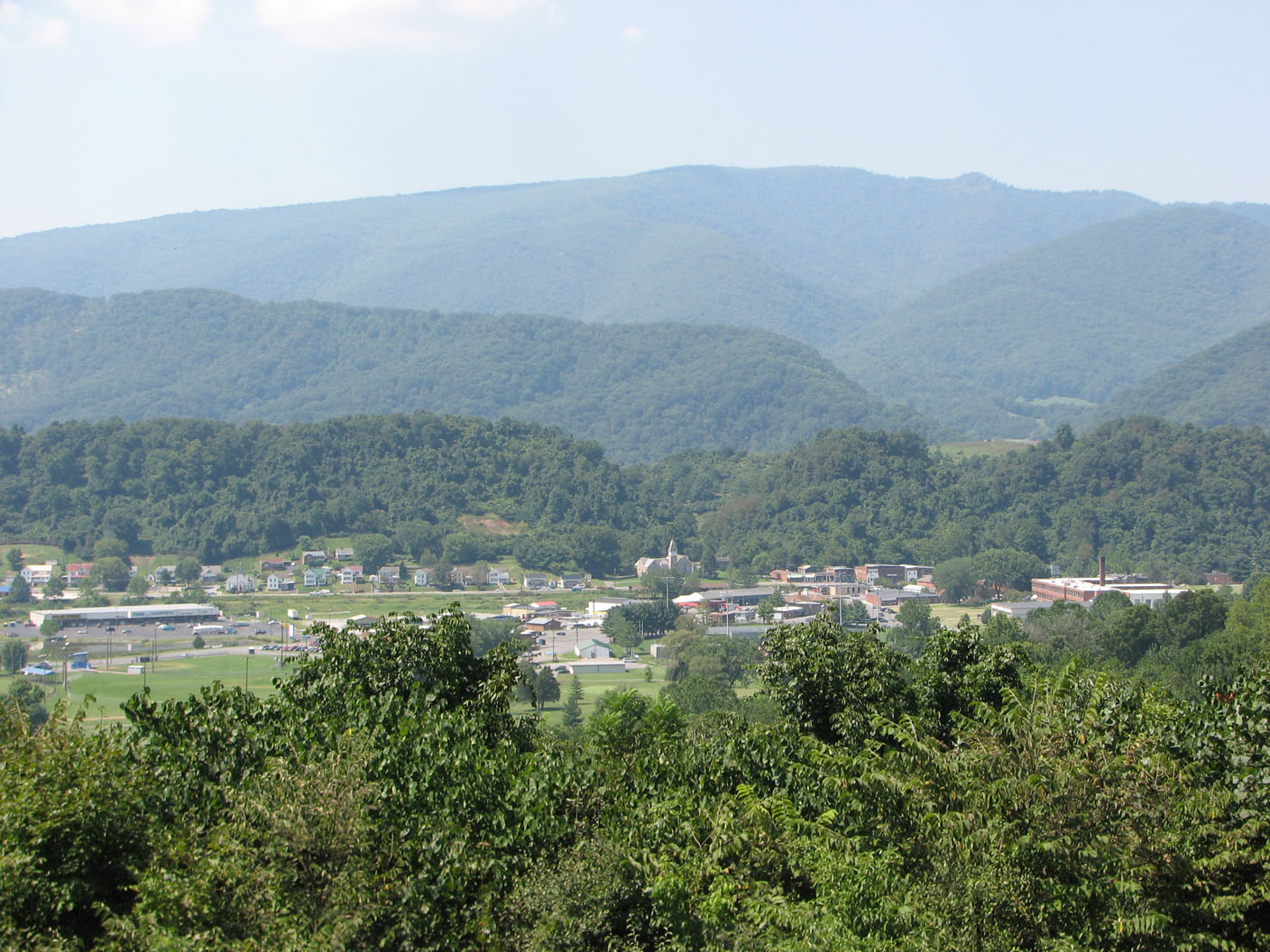

- Seal

- Location in the Commonwealth of Virginia Saltville (the United States)
- Coordinates: 36°52′25″N 81°45′39″W
- Country: United States
- State: Virginia
- Counties: Smyth, Washington

Government
  - Mayor: Cheri Heath Fullen

Area
  - Total: 8.13 sq mi (21.06 km^{2})
  - Land: 8.02 sq mi (20.76 km^{2})
  - Water: 0.11 sq mi (0.29 km^{2}) 1.40%
- Elevation: 1,726 ft (526 m)

Population (2020)
  - Total: 1,824
  - Density: 228/sq mi (87.9/km^{2})
- Time zone: UTC−5 (EST)
  - Summer (DST): UTC−4 (EDT)
- ZIP code: 24370
- Area code: 276
- FIPS code: 51-70096
- GNIS feature ID: 1486913
- Website: saltville.org

Saltville is a town in Smyth and Washington counties in the U.S. state of Virginia. The population was 1,824 at the 2020 census. It is part of the Kingsport–Bristol (TN)–Bristol (VA) Metropolitan Statistical Area, which is a component of the Johnson City–Kingsport–Bristol, TN-VA Combined Statistical Area – commonly known as the "Tri-Cities" region.

== History ==
Saltville was named for the salt marshes in the area. Prior to European settlement, these marshes attracted local wildlife. Excavations at the SV-2 archaeological site in the area have recovered several well preserved skeletons of now extinct species dating back to the last ice age. Indigenous peoples of varying cultures hunted at the marshes. The historic Native American people in the area were the Chisca.

Archaeologists in 1992 proposed the existence of a prehistoric "Saltville Complex Petty Chiefdom", with a paramount village located at the Northwood High School site, 44SM8. They reported "Saltville style gorgets" as well as iron and copper materials, scattered across the region.

During the spring of 1567, Spanish conquistador Hernando Moyano de Morales led a force of 15-20 soldiers northward from Fort San Juan in Joara, a city in what is now western North Carolina. The force attacked and burned the Chisca village of Maniatique, which may have been located at or near the site of Saltville.

=== Civil War ===
During the American Civil War, Saltville was one of the Confederacy's main saltworks. The saltworks were considered vital to the Confederate war effort because the salt was used in preserving meat for Confederate soldiers and civilians. Because of its importance, the town was attacked by Northern forces intent on destroying the saltworks. On October 2, 1864, the First Battle of Saltville was fought there. In the battle Union forces attacked Saltville but were defeated by Confederate troops. Following the battle a number of wounded black troops were murdered in what was dubbed the "Saltville Massacre." (Shortly after the war Champ Ferguson was tried, convicted, and executed for war crimes for this and other killings.)

Two months later General George Stoneman, a Union cavalry commander, led a second attack on the saltworks; the Second Battle of Saltville. This time the Confederates were defeated and the saltworks were destroyed by Union troops. The loss of the Saltville works was considered a major blow to the Confederacy's dwindling resources.

=== Additional history ===
Preston House, Saltville Battlefields Historic District, Saltville Historic District, and the Scott-Walker House are listed on the National Register of Historic Places.

Hydrazine rocket fuel made by Olin Mathieson Chemical Corporation's plant in Saltville was used to power the rocket that took the first humans to the moon in the Apollo 11 mission.

The View from Battle at Cedar Branch marker above Saltville.

=== Muck Dam collapse ===
Saltville was the location of the infamous "Muck Dam" break on December 24, 1924, which allowed the release of a huge volume of liquid chemical waste stored there by the Mathieson Alkali Company into the north fork of the Holston River, taking the lives of nineteen people who lived along the river. The river remained polluted and virtually dead for several decades afterward.

== Geography ==
According to the United States Census Bureau, the town has a total area of 8.1 square miles (21.0 km^{2}), of which 8.1 square miles (20.8 km^{2}) is land and 0.04 square mile (0.1 km^{2}) (0.49%) is water.

The salt caverns in Saltville are used for natural gas storage, the only ones to serve the Mid-Atlantic states. The cavern type in Saltville is considered the best for this purpose because the gas can be injected and removed quickly to meet immediate demand.

=== Climate ===
The climate in this area features moderate differences between highs and lows, and there is adequate rainfall year-round. The Köppen Climate Classification subtype for this climate is "Cfb". (Marine West Coast Climate/Oceanic climate).

Climate data for Saltville, Virginia (1991–2020 normals, extremes 1894–present)
Month	Jan	Feb	Mar	Apr	May	Jun	Jul	Aug	Sep	Oct	Nov	Dec	Year
Record high °F (°C)	79 (26)	84 (29)	86 (30)	90 (32)	95 (35)	99 (37)	102 (39)	100 (38)	100 (38)	94 (34)	84 (29)	79 (26)	102 (39)
Mean daily maximum °F (°C)	44.2 (6.8)	48.0 (8.9)	56.9 (13.8)	67.5 (19.7)	75.0 (23.9)	81.5 (27.5)	84.4 (29.1)	83.7 (28.7)	79.0 (26.1)	68.8 (20.4)	57.5 (14.2)	47.6 (8.7)	66.2 (19.0)
Daily mean °F (°C)	33.7 (0.9)	36.6 (2.6)	44.0 (6.7)	53.2 (11.8)	62.0 (16.7)	69.5 (20.8)	73.1 (22.8)	72.2 (22.3)	66.5 (19.2)	55.0 (12.8)	44.0 (6.7)	36.8 (2.7)	53.9 (12.2)
Mean daily minimum °F (°C)	23.2 (−4.9)	25.3 (−3.7)	31.0 (−0.6)	39.0 (3.9)	48.9 (9.4)	57.5 (14.2)	61.8 (16.6)	60.6 (15.9)	54.0 (12.2)	41.2 (5.1)	30.6 (−0.8)	26.1 (−3.3)	41.6 (5.3)
Record low °F (°C)	−12 (−24)	−19 (−28)	−4 (−20)	20 (−7)	29 (−2)	37 (3)	42 (6)	45 (7)	31 (−1)	17 (−8)	2 (−17)	−6 (−21)	−19 (−28)
Average precipitation inches (mm)	3.80 (97)	3.77 (96)	4.35 (110)	4.28 (109)	4.30 (109)	4.39 (112)	5.14 (131)	4.53 (115)	3.46 (88)	2.97 (75)	3.04 (77)	4.12 (105)	48.15 (1,223)
Average snowfall inches (cm)	1.9 (4.8)	4.2 (11)	1.6 (4.1)	0.1 (0.25)	0.0 (0.0)	0.0 (0.0)	0.0 (0.0)	0.0 (0.0)	0.0 (0.0)	0.0 (0.0)	0.1 (0.25)	2.4 (6.1)	10.3 (26)
Average precipitation days (≥ 0.01 in)	12.6	12.0	12.6	12.2	14.3	13.6	13.6	11.9	9.2	9.4	9.7	12.5	143.6
Average snowy days (≥ 0.1 in)	1.7	1.8	0.8	0.0	0.0	0.0	0.0	0.0	0.0	0.0	0.2	1.2	5.7
Source: NOAA

== Demographics ==
Historical population
Census	Pop.	Note	%±
1880	185		—
1900	1,051		—
1910	1,628		54.9%
1920	2,248		38.1%
1930	2,964		31.9%
1940	2,650		−10.6%
1950	2,678		1.1%
1960	2,844		6.2%
1970	2,527		−11.1%
1980	2,376		−6.0%
1990	2,300		−3.2%
2000	2,204		−4.2%
2010	2,077		−5.8%
2020	1,824		−12.2%

=== 2020 census ===
As of the 2020 census, Saltville had a population of 1,824. The median age was 47.0 years. 19.7% of residents were under the age of 18 and 22.4% of residents were 65 years of age or older. For every 100 females there were 95.3 males, and for every 100 females age 18 and over there were 90.9 males age 18 and over.

0.0% of residents lived in urban areas, while 100.0% lived in rural areas.

There were 772 households in Saltville, of which 24.9% had children under the age of 18 living in them. Of all households, 40.9% were married-couple households, 20.3% were households with a male householder and no spouse or partner present, and 32.4% were households with a female householder and no spouse or partner present. About 33.1% of all households were made up of individuals and 16.4% had someone living alone who was 65 years of age or older.

There were 935 housing units, of which 17.4% were vacant. The homeowner vacancy rate was 5.2% and the rental vacancy rate was 9.4%.

Racial composition as of the 2020 census
Race	Number	Percent
White	1,749	95.9%
Black or African American	6	0.3%
American Indian and Alaska Native	0	0.0%
Asian	11	0.6%
Native Hawaiian and Other Pacific Islander	0	0.0%
Some other race	5	0.3%
Two or more races	53	2.9%
Hispanic or Latino (of any race)	12	0.7%

=== 2010 census ===
As of the census of 2010, there were 2,077 people, 879 households, and 593 families residing in the town. The population density (in 2000) was 273.7 people per square mile (105.7/km^{2}). There were 967 housing units. The racial makeup of the town was 98.5% White, 0.4% African American, 0.1% Native American, 0.05% from other races, and 0.7% from two or more races. Hispanic or Latino of any race were 0.5% of the population.

There were 879 households, out of which 24% had children under the age of 18 living with them, 45.4% were married couples living together, 14.6% had a female householder with no husband present, and 32.5% were non-families. The average household size was 2.36 and the average family size was 2.91.

In the town, the population was spread out, with 24.5% under the age of 19, 6.5% from 20 to 24, 21.2% from 25 to 44, 30.5% from 45 to 64, and 17.5% who were 65 years of age or older. The median age was 43.4 years. For every 100 females, there were 89.3 males. For every 100 females age 18 and over, there were 85.1 males.

=== Income and poverty ===
The median income for a household in the town was $24,375, and the median income for a family was $42,639. Males had a median income of $36,071 versus $30,063 for females. The per capita income for the town was $19,595. About 18.1% of families and 20.6% of the population were below the poverty line, including 41.4% of those under age 18 and 15.9% of those age 65 or over.

== Arts and culture ==
The Museum of the Middle Appalachians is located in downtown Saltville. The museum displays exhibits on topics including the geological history of the region, the American Civil War, the company town era of Saltville's history, and the Woodland Indians.

== Notable people ==
- Georgia Blizzard - Ceramics artist whose works are in the permanent collections of the Smithsonian American Art Museum and other museums.
- Clay Davidson - Country musician
- Texas Gladden- Folk singer, sister of Hobart Smith
- Robert Porterfield - founder of the Barter Theater
- Elizabeth Henry Campbell Russell - Sister of Patrick Henry, introduced Methodism to Southwest Virginia. The Madam Russell Memorial United Methodist Church and the Elizabeth Cemetery in Saltville are named for her.
- Hobart Smith - Old time music legend
