= Greenfield, Pittsylvania County, Virginia =

Unincorporated community in Virginia, US

Coordinates: 36°56′18″N 79°16′57″W

Greenfield, Pittsylvania County is an unincorporated community in Pittsylvania County, in the U.S. state of Virginia.
