= Tim Plester =

British actor, playwright, and filmmaker (born 1970)

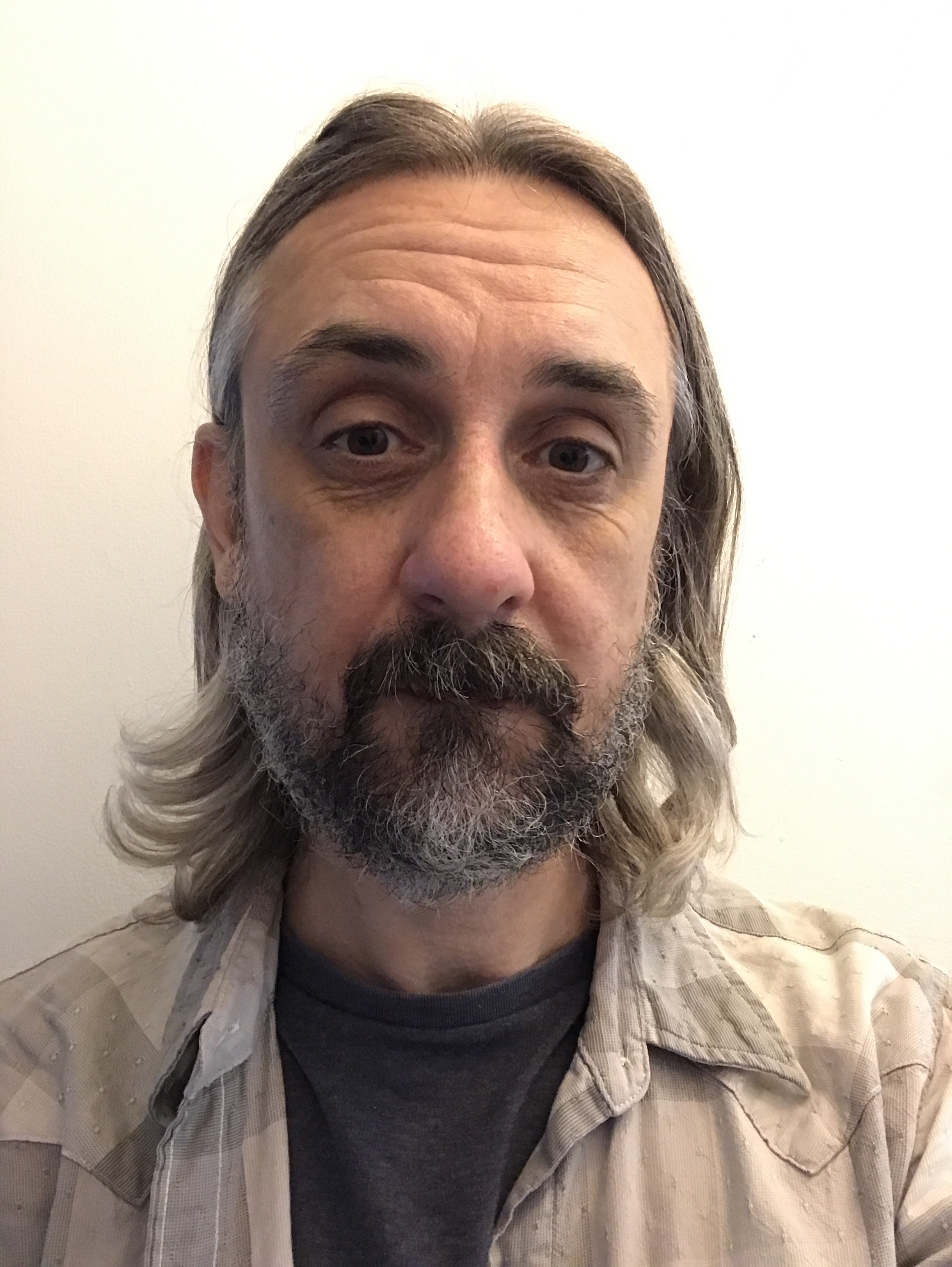
- Plester in 2021
- Born: Timothy Marc Plester; 10 September 1970 (age 55); Oxfordshire, England
- Education: Dartington College of Arts (BA); Birmingham University (MA (Hons))
- Occupations: Actor, playwright, filmmaker

Timothy Marc Plester (born 10 September 1970) is a British actor, playwright, and filmmaker, best known for the documentaries Way of the Morris and The Ballad of Shirley Collins - plus a multifarious number of cameo roles for film and TV.

== Early life and education ==
Born and raised in Banbury, Oxfordshire, Plester graduated from Dartington College of Arts in Devon, with a BA in Theatre, and went on to obtain an MA (Hons) in playwriting studies from Birmingham University.

== Career ==
Plester's award-winning documentary Way of the Morris premiered at SXSW 2011 and received a limited theatrical release in UK cinemas before being released on DVD. Co-directed with Rob Curry and produced independently by Fifth Column Films, the feature-length documentary includes contributions from Billy Bragg, Fairport Convention's Chris Leslie and members of The Adderbury Village Morris Men. It was selected by the UK Film Focus as one of the "Breakthrough" British films of 2011. Plester and Curry are also responsible for the short field-recorded documentary Here We’m Be Together (which premiered at the 2014 BFI London Film Festival). The Ballad of Shirley Collins, the duo's feature-length film about the iconic English folk-singer Shirley Collins, premiered at the 2017 BFI London Film Festival). Partly funded by a successful kickstarter campaign, the film also screened at the Rotterdam international film festival and CPH:DOX in Denmark. Southern Journey (Revisited), Plester and Curry's third feature-length documentary together, premiered at Sheffield Doc/Fest in 2020 and was screened on Sky Arts in the autumn of 2021. Other work together includes Hillbilly Homilies, a profile piece on the Appalachain poet Maurice Manning, and The Battle Of Denham Ford, which won a Special Mention in the UK Competition at Sheffield Doc/Fest 2021. The directing duo are currently completing work on a feature-length documentary about the folklorist Doc Rowe, following a hugely successful crowdfunding campaign in 2023. They are also working with the illustrator and land-rights campaigner Nick Hayes on an adaptation of his best-selling book, 'The Book of Trespass'.

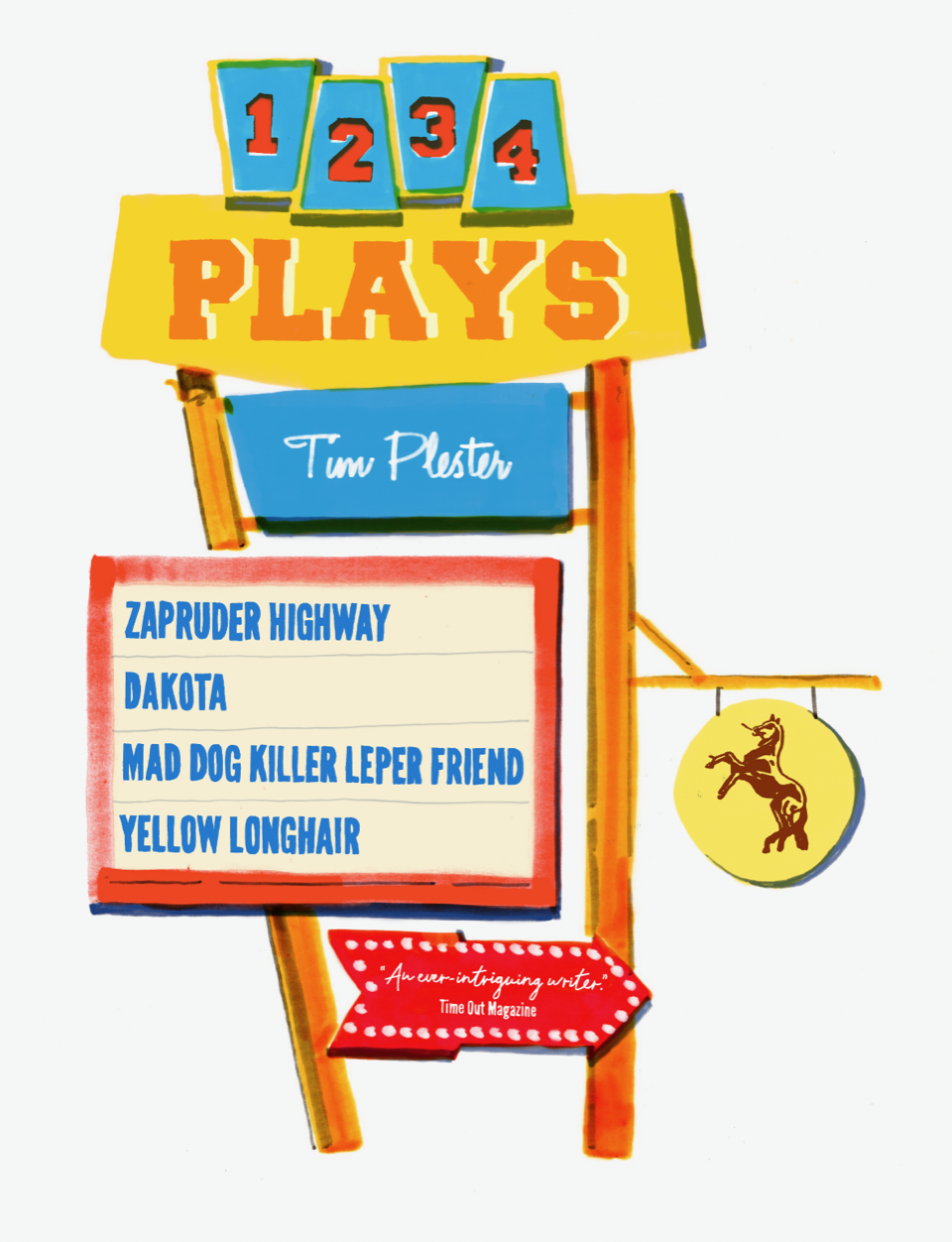
1-2-3-4 Plays, published in 2020 (cover design by Holly Wales)

Plester's writing credits for film include Ant Muzak (2002), a short film directed by Ben Gregor and starring Nick Moran and Mackenzie Crook. It was the winner of an Audience Award at the 2003 Sydney Film Festival and was nominated for 'Best UK Short' at the 2003 Soho Rushes Festival and the 2002 Raindance Film Festival. He also wrote and created Blake's Junction 7 (2004) - again directed by Ben Gregor and starring Johnny Vegas, Mackenzie Crook, Mark Heap, Raquel Cassidy and Martin Freeman – which premiered at the 2004 Edinburgh Film Festival. Both films became cult hits and were released on DVD in 2008, along with a third film entitled World of Wrestling (2007). Again created and written by Plester and directed by Gregor, the film stars Mackenzie Crook, Kevin Eldon, Patrick Baladi, Miranda Hart and Kris Marshall. In 2007, Plester also completed work on an offbeat romantic comedy entitled English Language (With English Subtitles) - which marked his directorial debut. The short, in which Plester also starred (alongside MyAnna Buring and Craig Parkinson), premiered at the 2007 Los Angeles Film Festival and went on to screen at over 45 film festivals worldwide, picking-up 5 awards along the way. He has also written and directed the JFK-inspired beat poem Et In Motorcadia Ego! and the award-winning 15-second film Slapphappy, which premiered at the Belfast Film Festival in 2008.

Winner of the 1992/93 'National Student Playwright Of The Year' award, Plester has writing credits for the theatre including: Dakota (Edinburgh Festival 1995 and National Tour 1996); Mad Dog Killer Leper Fiend (Edinburgh Festival 1996 and London's Man In The Moon Theatre 1997); and Yellow Longhair (London's Oval House Theatre 2000). A collection of his stageplays 1-2-3-4 Plays was published in September 2020.

Plester's many and varied acting credits for TV and film include: Lockout (EuropaCorp), Kick-Ass (Universal), Control (Northsee Pictures), Cuban Fury (Big Talk), Closer to the Moon (Mandragora Movies), Wolf Hall (BBC), Bone in the Throat (Hello and Company), Shifty (Metrodome), Doctor Who (BBC), Life On Mars (BBC), Hustle (BBC), Murphy's Law (BBC), 1066: The Battle For Middle Earth (Channel 4), Magicians (Universal Films), It's All Gone Pete Tong (Vertigo Films), Galavant (ABC), Heist (BBC), Ant Muzak (Film Club), Criminal Justice (BBC), Five Daughters (BBC), Silent Witness (BBC), The Wrong Mans (BBC), Uncle Dad (SMG), Goths (BBC), Residents (BBC), Poliakoff's Friends and Crocodiles (BBC), both series of Paul Whitehouse’s Happiness (BBC) and the 2009 BAFTA-winning short film September. Plester played petty thief Linus Brody in the first two series’ of the BBC Birmingham production WPC 56. He played the role of Black Walder Rivers in the HBO series Game of Thrones and the homeless junkie Julian in After Life.

In 2018, he played Roy Thomas Baker, Queen's producer, in the film Bohemian Rhapsody. In September 2019, he appeared in an episode of Doctors as Martin Taylor. In 2020, he appeared as Mark in the independent Icelandic feature film Backyard Village. Plester has also appeared in three episodes of Mackenzie's Crook's re-booted version of Worzel Gummidge for the BBC. In 2025, he made his Star Wars debut as Fay Drolla, the rebel droidsmith who reprograms K-2SO in Episode 9 of Andor Season 2.
