= Rob Curry =

British film director

Rob Curry is a British film director, best known for his work on theatrical documentaries. His films include TEMPEST (released in UK cinemas in 2012), and Way of the Morris (co-directed with Tim Plester), which premiered at SXSW and was released in the UK in 2011.

== Filmography ==
Features:

2020 Southern Journey (Revisited) (documentary)

2019 The Chills: The Triumph and the Tragedy of Martin Phillips (documentary)

2017 The Ballad of Shirley Collins (documentary)

2012 Tempest (documentary)

2011 Way of the Morris (documentary)

2007 The Boat People (fiction)
