= Northwood High School (Saltville, Virginia) =

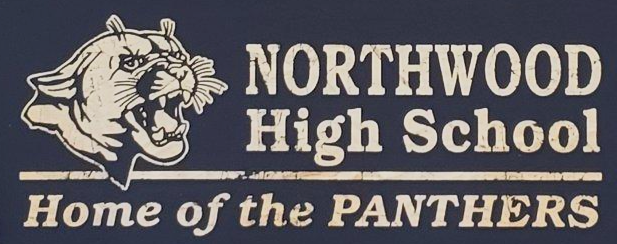

Location
- 305 Panther Lane; Saltville, Virginia; United States; 36.879°N 81.763°W

Information
- Former names: R.B Worthy High School (1957-1987) Rich Valley High School (1927-1987) (Consolidated with Northwood)
- Type: Public
- Established: 1957 (R. B. Worthy High School); 1987 (Northwood High School)
- School district: Smyth County Public Schools
- Principal: Mr. Andrew Hipple
- Faculty: 20.23 (on FTE basis)
- Grades: 9 to 12
- Enrollment: 278 (2016-17)
- Student to teacher ratio: 13.25
- Colors: Blue and Silver
- Athletics conference: VHSL Class 1 VHSL Region D VHSL Hogoheegee District
- Mascot: Panther
- Website: https://nhs.scsb.org/

Northwood High School is a public high school located in Saltville, Virginia. The school serves about 300 students in grades 9 to 12 in the Smyth County Public Schools system. The school operates on a 4x4 block schedule and has many goals in place to improve the achievement of students on Virginia Standards of Learning exams.

The school opened in 1957 as R. B. Worthy High School. In 1987, Northwood High School was formed when R. B. Worthy and Rich Valley High Schools were consolidated due to declining enrollment. The school is fed by Northwood Middle School, which, in turn, is fed by Saltville Elementary School and Rich Valley Elementary School.

Northwood's mascot is the black panther, and they are known as The Panthers.

== Athletics ==
Northwood High School has a number of athletic programs:

- Football
- Volleyball
- Cheerleading
- Boys and Girls Basketball
- Baseball
- Softball
- Track
- Golf
- Wrestling

State Championships

- Volleyball, 1998
- Girls Basketball, 2016

== Academics ==
Northwood is a member of the Southwest Academic Conference.

Championships:

- English - 2004, 2006
- Social Studies - 2003, 2004, 2005, 2006
- All-Around - 2006

== Arts ==
Band

The band is known as the Panther Pride Marching band and consisted of about 20 members as of 2019. It is under the direction of Cameron Robison.

The band has won numerous awards since 2018 including 1st Places in Percussion, Colorguard, and Drum Major. The band also received an "Excellent Rating" at the 2018 VBDOA State Marching Assessment.

The Band's 2025 show is titled "The Reign" with music from "Pictures at an Exhibition" including: Promenade, Baba-Yaga, And the Great Gate of Kiev by Modest Mussorgsky.

Art

Northwood High School offers Art I-V (1-5) and is taught by Tammy Carter.

Theatre

In 2016 Northwood High School placed 1st in the Crooked Road Conference with a play titled "Look Me in the Eye" by Lindsay Price. The class is taught by David Burns.
