= Smyth County, Virginia =

County in Virginia, United States

- County
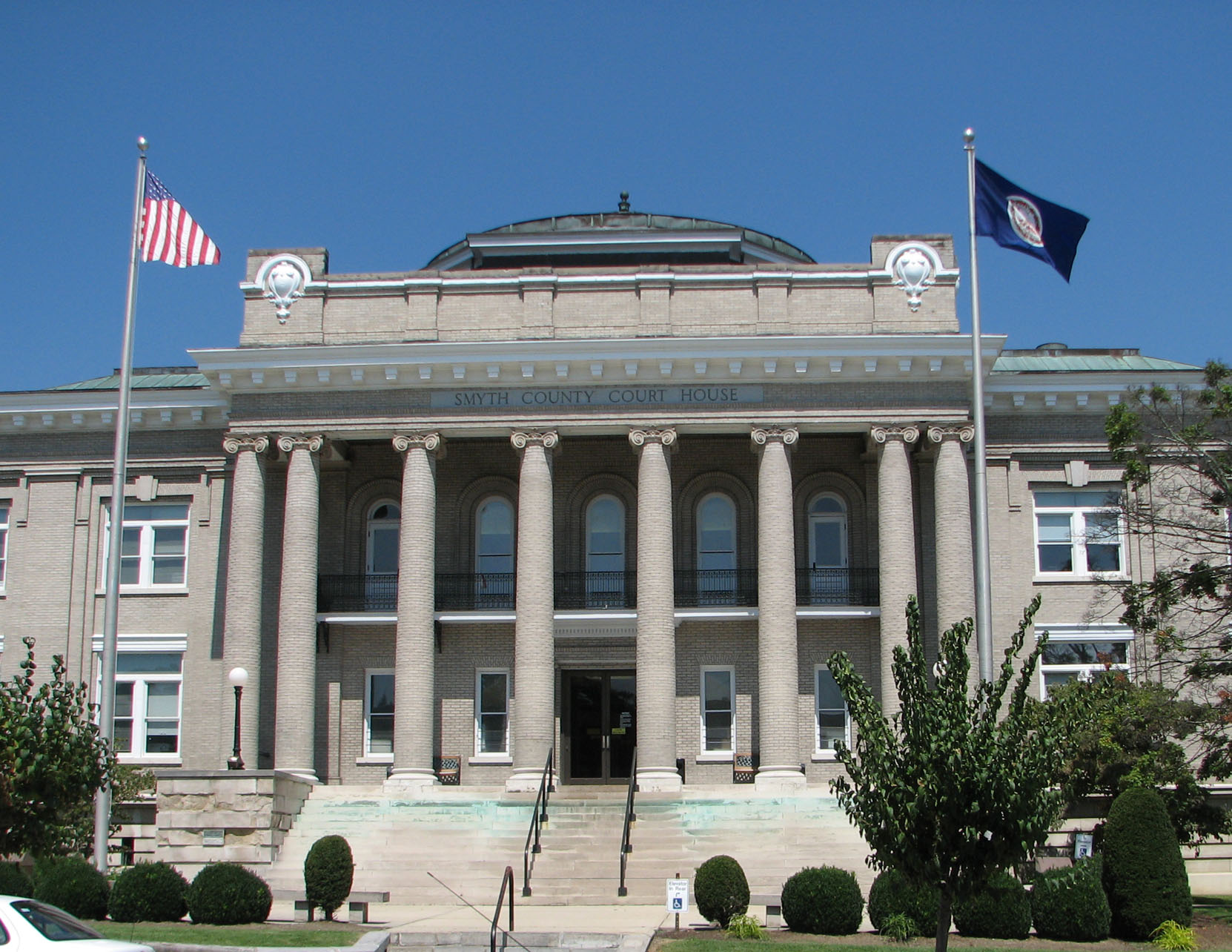
- Smyth County Courthouse in Marion

- Flag Seal

- Location within the U.S. state of Virginia
- Coordinates: 36°50′N 81°32′W
- Country: United States
- State: Virginia
- Founded: 1832
- Named for: Alexander Smyth
- Seat: Marion
- Largest town: Marion

Area
  - Total: 452 sq mi (1,170 km^{2})
  - Land: 451 sq mi (1,170 km^{2})
  - Water: 1.4 sq mi (3.6 km^{2}) 0.3%

Population (2020)
  - Total: 29,800
  - Estimate (2025): 28,882 ▼
  - Density: 66.1/sq mi (25.5/km^{2})
- Time zone: UTC−5 (Eastern)
  - Summer (DST): UTC−4 (EDT)
- Congressional district: 9th
- Website: www.smythcounty.org

Smyth County is a county located in the U.S. state of Virginia. As of the 2020 census, the population was 29,800. Its county seat is Marion.

== History ==
Smyth County was formed on February 23, 1832, from Washington and Wythe counties. The county is named after Alexander Smyth, a general during the War of 1812 who was elected to the state Senate, House of Delegates, and as a Representative to the United States Congress.

== Geography ==
According to the U.S. Census Bureau, the county has a total area of 452 square miles (1,170 km^{2}), of which 451 square miles (1,170 km^{2}) is land and 1.4 square miles (3.6 km^{2}) (0.3%) is water. Smyth County is one of the 423 counties served by the Appalachian Regional Commission, and it is identified as part of "Greater Appalachia" by Colin Woodard in his book American Nations: A History of the Eleven Rival Regional Cultures of North America.

=== Adjacent counties ===
- Russell County – northwest
- Tazewell County – north
- Bland County – northeast
- Wythe County – east
- Grayson County – south
- Washington County – southwest

=== National protected areas ===
- Jefferson National Forest (part)
- Mount Rogers National Recreation Area (part)

=== Major highways ===
- I-81
- US 11
- SR 16
- SR 42
- SR 91
- SR 107

== Demographics ==
Historical population
Census	Pop.	Note	%±
1840	6,522		—
1850	8,162		25.1%
1860	8,952		9.7%
1870	8,898		−0.6%
1880	12,160		36.7%
1890	13,360		9.9%
1900	17,121		28.2%
1910	20,326		18.7%
1920	22,125		8.9%
1930	25,125		13.6%
1940	28,861		14.9%
1950	30,187		4.6%
1960	31,066		2.9%
1970	31,349		0.9%
1980	33,366		6.4%
1990	32,370		−3.0%
2000	33,081		2.2%
2010	32,208		−2.6%
2020	29,800		−7.5%
2025 (est.)	28,882	▼	−3.1%
U.S. Decennial Census; 1790–1960 1900–1990; 1990–2000 2010 2020

=== Racial and ethnic composition ===
Smyth County, Virginia – Racial and ethnic composition Note: the US Census treats Hispanic/Latino as an ethnic category. This table excludes Latinos from the racial categories and assigns them to a separate category. Hispanics/Latinos may be of any race.
Race / Ethnicity (NH = Non-Hispanic)	Pop 1980	Pop 1990	Pop 2000	Pop 2010	Pop 2020	% 1980	% 1990	% 2000	% 2010	% 2020
White alone (NH)	48,751	44,349	31,880	30,642	27,762	96.52%	96.49%	96.37%	95.14%	93.16%
Black or African American alone (NH)	1,283	1,184	607	630	408	2.54%	2.58%	1.83%	1.96%	1.37%
Native American or Alaska Native alone (NH)	39	46	49	41	36	0.08%	0.10%	0.15%	0.13%	0.12%
Asian alone (NH)	127	244	61	82	104	0.25%	0.53%	0.18%	0.25%	0.35%
Native Hawaiian or Pacific Islander alone (NH)	x	x	0	3	1	x	x	0.00%	0.01%	0.00%
Other race alone (NH)	37	3	14	18	49	0.07%	0.01%	0.04%	0.06%	0.16%
Mixed race or Multiracial (NH)	x	x	187	265	882	x	x	0.57%	0.82%	2.96%
Hispanic or Latino (any race)	274	134	283	527	558	0.54%	0.29%	0.86%	1.64%	1.87%
Total	50,511	45,960	33,081	32,208	29,800	100.00%	100.00%	100.00%	100.00%	100.00%

=== 2020 census ===
As of the 2020 census, the county had a population of 29,800. The median age was 46.0 years. 19.6% of residents were under the age of 18 and 22.5% of residents were 65 years of age or older. For every 100 females there were 95.7 males, and for every 100 females age 18 and over there were 93.6 males age 18 and over.

The racial makeup of the county was 93.8% White, 1.4% Black or African American, 0.1% American Indian and Alaska Native, 0.3% Asian, 0.0% Native Hawaiian and Pacific Islander, 0.8% from some other race, and 3.5% from two or more races. Hispanic or Latino residents of any race comprised 1.9% of the population.

24.4% of residents lived in urban areas, while 75.6% lived in rural areas.

There were 12,819 households in the county, of which 25.2% had children under the age of 18 living with them and 29.4% had a female householder with no spouse or partner present. About 31.5% of all households were made up of individuals and 15.6% had someone living alone who was 65 years of age or older.

There were 15,097 housing units, of which 15.1% were vacant. Among occupied housing units, 69.4% were owner-occupied and 30.6% were renter-occupied. The homeowner vacancy rate was 1.8% and the rental vacancy rate was 7.4%.

=== 2000 Census ===
As of the census of 2000, there were 33,081 people, 13,493 households, and 9,607 families residing in the county. The population density was 73 inhabitants per square mile (28/km^{2}). There were 15,111 housing units at an average density of 33 units per square mile (13 units/km^{2}). The racial makeup of the county was 96.86% White, 1.87% Black or African American, 0.15% Native American, 0.18% Asian, 0.32% from other races, and 0.60% from two or more races. 0.86% of the population were Hispanic or Latino of any race.

There were 13,493 households, out of which 29.20% had children under the age of 18 living with them, 55.70% were married couples living together, 11.20% had a female householder with no husband present, and 28.80% were non-families. 26.00% of all households were made up of individuals, and 12.50% had someone living alone who was 65 years of age or older. The average household size was 2.37 and the average family size was 2.83.

In the county, the population was spread out, with 21.60% under the age of 18, 8.00% from 18 to 24, 28.10% from 25 to 44, 26.00% from 45 to 64, and 16.30% who were 65 years of age or older. The median age was 40 years. For every 100 females there were 93.80 males. For every 100 females aged 18 and over, there were 90.50 males.

The median income for a household in the county was $30,083, and the median income for a family was $36,392. Males had a median income of $26,698 versus $19,712 for females. The per capita income for the county was $16,105. About 9.90% of families and 13.30% of the population were below the poverty line, including 15.20% of those under age 18 and 14.00% of those age 65 or over.

== Tourism ==
The Smyth County Tourism Association was formed in April 2006 to promote sustainable tourism development and manages the operation of the state-certified H.L. Bonham Regional Development and Tourism Center. The organization markets the area through https://visitsmythcountyva.com/

== Education ==
=== Public high schools ===
- Chilhowie High School, Chilhowie
- Marion Senior High School, Marion
- Northwood High School, Saltville

=== Job Corps ===
- Blue Ridge Job Corps, Marion

== Communities ==
=== Towns ===
- Chilhowie
- Marion
- Saltville (partly in Washington County)

=== Census-designated places ===
- Adwolfe
- Allison Gap
- Atkins
- McMullin
- Seven Mile Ford
- Sugar Grove

=== Other unincorporated communities ===
- Groseclose
- Rich Valley
- Konnarock

== Politics ==
United States presidential election results for Smyth County, Virginia
Year	Republican		Democratic		Third party(ies)	
Year	No.	%	No.	%	No.	%
1912	609	27.46%	1,022	46.08%	587	26.47%
1916	1,321	53.63%	1,134	46.04%	8	0.32%
1920	1,883	55.16%	1,516	44.41%	15	0.44%
1924	2,232	53.50%	1,907	45.71%	33	0.79%
1928	2,751	58.68%	1,937	41.32%	0	0.00%
1932	1,843	43.92%	2,287	54.50%	66	1.57%
1936	2,067	46.75%	2,337	52.86%	17	0.38%
1940	2,134	46.70%	2,420	52.95%	16	0.35%
1944	2,726	54.53%	2,266	45.33%	7	0.14%
1948	2,897	60.08%	1,750	36.29%	175	3.63%
1952	3,694	64.98%	1,972	34.69%	19	0.33%
1956	4,771	66.23%	2,374	32.95%	59	0.82%
1960	4,256	59.62%	2,864	40.12%	18	0.25%
1964	3,830	48.16%	4,113	51.72%	9	0.11%
1968	5,297	54.32%	2,631	26.98%	1,823	18.70%
1972	6,409	72.27%	2,280	25.71%	179	2.02%
1976	5,032	47.29%	5,246	49.30%	363	3.41%
1980	6,033	50.86%	5,335	44.98%	493	4.16%
1984	8,593	67.08%	4,102	32.02%	116	0.91%
1988	7,446	63.49%	3,989	34.02%	292	2.49%
1992	6,128	47.39%	4,924	38.08%	1,879	14.53%
1996	4,966	42.74%	4,990	42.95%	1,663	14.31%
2000	6,580	56.05%	4,836	41.19%	324	2.76%
2004	7,906	64.18%	4,143	33.63%	270	2.19%
2008	7,817	63.54%	4,239	34.46%	246	2.00%
2012	8,379	65.58%	4,171	32.64%	227	1.78%
2016	9,750	75.64%	2,665	20.67%	475	3.69%
2020	10,963	77.55%	3,008	21.28%	165	1.17%
2024	11,521	79.63%	2,805	19.39%	142	0.98%

== See also ==
- National Register of Historic Places listings in Smyth County, Virginia
