= Bullet (disambiguation) =

A bullet is a projectile propelled by a firearm, sling, or air gun.

Bullet may also refer to:

== Arts and entertainment ==
=== Films and television ===
- Bullet (1976 film), an Indian Hindi language film directed by Vijay Anand
- Bullet (1984 film), an Indian Malayalam language film directed by Crossbelt Mani
- Bullet (1985 film), an Indian Telugu language film directed by Bapu
- Bullet (1996 film), an American film starring Mickey Rourke and Tupac Shakur
- Bullet (1999 film), a Philippine film directed by and starring Cesar Montano
- Bullet (2008 film), a Malayalam language film directed by Nizar
- Bullet (2014 film), an American action film starring Danny Trejo
- Bullets (Finnish TV series), a 2018 Finnish action drama television series starring Sibel Kekilli
- Bullets (Indian TV series), 2021

=== Music ===
- Bullet Records, several record labels
- Bullet (Swedish band), a heavy metal band
- Bullet (American band), a one-hit wonder rock band known for "White Lies, Blue Eyes"
- Bullet for My Valentine, a Welsh metalcore band
- Bullet, an English hard rock band, renamed to Hard Stuff in 1972
- Bullett (Mat Kearney album), 2004
- "Bullet" (Christian Burns song), 2012
- "Bullets" (Creed song), 2002
- "Bullets" (Editors song), 2005
- "Bullet" (Fluke song), 1995
- "Bullet" (Franz Ferdinand song), 2013
- "Bullet" (Hollywood Undead song), 2011
- "Bullet" (Misfits song), 1978
- "Bullet" (Superheist song), 2001
- "Bullet", a song by Covenant from Northern Light, 2002
- "Bullet", a song by Infinite Mass, 2001
- "Bullet", a song by Stan Walker from All In, 2022
- "Bullet", a song by The Rasmus from Into, 2001
- "Bullet", a song by The Reverend Horton Heat from Smoke 'Em If You Got 'Em, 1990
- "Bullet", a song by Zior Park, 2023
- Fender Bullet and Squier Bullet, electric guitars

=== Comics ===
- Bullet (DC Thomson), a British comic published during the 1970s
- Bullet (Marvel Comics), a Marvel Comics character

=== Other ===
- Bullet (novel), the nineteenth book in the Anita Blake: Vampire Hunter series by Laurell K. Hamilton

== People ==
- Bullet (nickname)
- Bullet (surname)
- Bob Armstrong (1939–2020), known as Bullet, professional wrestler
- Bullet, a fictional character from the BlazBlue series

== Sports ==
- Baltimore Bullets (disambiguation), three basketball franchises from the 1940s to the 1970s
- Birmingham Bullets, a British Basketball League team from 1982 to 2006
- Brisbane Bullets, a professional team in Australia's National Basketball League
- Camden Bullets, a 1960s American basketball team, originally the Baltimore Bullets
- Pigotts Bullets F.C., an Antigua and Barbuda Football Association team
- Texas Bullets, a Professional Indoor Football League in 1998
- Washington Wizards, formerly known as "The Bullets", a National Basketball Association team
- Bullet (mascot), the mascot of the sports teams at Oklahoma State University-Stillwater
- Bullet chess, a variant of blitz (high-speed) chess
- Bullets, otherwise known as Irish road bowling

== Technology ==
- Bullet (pressure vessel), a bullet-shaped storage container for gas
- Bullet (software), an open source physics engine
- Wave Mate Bullet, an early microcomputer
- Nose bullet, a turbojet component
- Bullet connector, a type of electrical connector

== Transport ==
- Bullet 14, an American sailboat design

=== Automotive ===
- Buckeye Bullet, an electric land speed vehicle designed and created by students at Ohio State University
- Bullet (car), a car prototype that was built in 1996 using a Mazda MX-5 body
- Sterling Bullet, a pickup truck marketed between 2007 and 2009
- Royal Enfield Bullet, a motorcycle in production since 1948
- Bristol Bullet, an open-top sports car

=== Aviation ===
- Bristol Bullet, a British biplane racing aircraft
- Brokaw Bullet, a two-seater sports airplane
- Bullet Monoplane, an American monoplane first flown in 1929
- Christmas Bullet, an American biplane fighter
- Guggenmos Bullet, a series of German hang gliders
- TrikeBuggy Bullet, an American powered parachute design

=== Rail ===
- Bullet train (disambiguation), an aerodynamically designed fast rail vehicle
- Bullet (interurban), a high-speed U.S. interurban rail car inaugurated in 1931
- Bathurst Bullet, a passenger train connecting Sydney and Bathurst, Australia
- Bullet TCV, a troop-carrying vehicle developed by Rhodesia
- Caribou (train), a passenger train formerly used in Newfoundland and colloquially referred to as The Newfie Bullet or The Bullet
- Bullet, a former passenger train of the Central Railroad of New Jersey

== Other uses ==
- Bullet (typography) (•), a solid typographic symbol
- Bullet, Switzerland, a municipality
- "Bullet", another name for the adult toy love egg
- "Bullet", a dog belonging to the singer and actor Roy Rogers
- Jake Bullet, a character in the 1989 action movie No Holds Barred
- The Bullet (UMW), the student newspaper of the University of Mary Washington
- Bullet (UAV), a Ukrainian interceptor drone

== See also ==
- Fender Bullet Bass, an electric bass guitar model produced by Fender
- Bullet Club, professional wrestling stable in the New Japan Pro Wrestling promotion
- Bullet loan, a noncallable regular coupon paying debt instrument
- Bullet Cluster, two colliding clusters of galaxies
- Bullet Galaxy
- Bullet Group, a newly merging group of galaxies
- Bullit (disambiguation)
- Bullitt (disambiguation)
