= Bullitt (disambiguation) =

Bullitt is a 1968 American dramatic thriller film starring Steve McQueen.

Bullitt may also refer to:

== People ==
- Alexander Scott Bullitt (1761–1816), Kentucky pioneer and statesman
- Cuthbert Bullitt (c. 1740–1791), Virginia planter, lawyer, and politician; brother of Thomas
- Dorothy Bullitt (1892–1989), American radio and television entrepreneur
- Jill Bullitt (b. 1951), American artist
- John Christian Bullitt (1824–1902), prominent lawyer and civic figure in Philadelphia, Pennsylvania
- Joshua Fry Bullitt, Jr. (1856–1933), Virginia lawyer; son of Joshua Bullitt
- Joshua Bullitt (1821–1898), Justice of the Kentucky Court of Appeals; father of Joshua Fry Bullitt, Jr.
- Kay Bullitt (1925–2021), American education reformer, civil rights activist and philanthropist
- Melvin Bullitt (b. 1984), American football player
- Thomas Bullitt (1730–1778), American soldier and pioneer from Virginia; brother of Cuthbert
- William Christian Bullitt, Jr. (1891–1967), American diplomat, journalist, and novelist
- William Marshall Bullitt (1873–1957), American lawyer and author

== Other uses ==
- Bullitt (Wilton Felder album), a 1969 album by saxophonist Wilton Felder
- Bullitt (soundtrack), the 1969 soundtrack album for the film
- Bullitt Center, in Seattle
- Bullitt County, Kentucky
- Bullitt Foundation, an American environmental organization
- Bullitt Group, a cell phone manufacturer
- Mustang Bullitt, a 2018 model of Ford Mustang cars

== See also ==
- Bullit (disambiguation)
- Bullet (disambiguation)
