= Bullit =

Bullit may refer to

- Brabus Bullit, an automobile
- "Bullit" (song), a dance song from French music producer Watermät
- "The Bullit" or Gordon Bullit, recurring character in US TV series The O.C.
- Spencer Bullit, recurring character in US TV series The O.C.

== See also ==
- Bullitt (disambiguation)
- Bullet (disambiguation)
