= Farnsley =

Farnsley can refer to:

- Charles R. Farnsley (1907–1990), mayor of Louisville, Kentucky
- Riverside, The Farnsley-Moremen Landing, a historic property in Louisville
