= Annie Henry Christian =

- Born: Anne Henry; 1738; Hanover County, Colony of Virginia
- Died: May 4, 1790 (aged 51–52); Norfolk, Virginia, Colony of Virginia
- Spouse: William Christian
- Relatives: Patrick Henry (brother), Elizabeth Henry Campbell Russell (sister), William Fleming (brother-in-law), Alexander Scott Bullitt (son-in-law)

Annie Henry Christian (1738–May 4, 1790) was a colonial pioneer who documented the journey with her husband William Christian and their children westward to Kentucky. Her brother was Patrick Henry, the governor of Virginia. Her sister, Elizabeth Henry Campbell Russell, was a Methodist lay leader. Her letters to family, friends, and business associates provide insight into westward movement of the 18th century America and life in the wilderness. Like Martha Washington and Catharine Flood McCall, she was a rare business woman, whose success was based upon slave labor. They had feme sole status of widows or single women who were able to operate businesses, manage finances, and enter into contracts.

== Early life ==
Annie Henry, the daughter of Sarah Winston Syme Henry and John Henry, was born in Hanover County, Virginia in 1738. John, Sarah's second husband, was an immigrant from Scotland. Of their eleven children, nine survived into adulthood. Patrick Henry, the governor of Virginia, was her brother. Elizabeth Henry Campbell Russell, a Methodist lay leader, was her sister. She was home-schooled by her parents, and was an articulate writer.

Annie was close to her brother Patrick, who introduced her to his friend William Christian. William studied law under Patrick.

== Marriage ==
Annie Henry married William Christian in early 1768, becoming Annie Henry Christian. William was from a wealthy Irish family. He served in the French and Indian War, was a landholder, and a politician who held public offices. The Christians lived in the Roanoke River Valley in what was Botetourt County in 1770. They lived near her sister-in-law Anne Christian Fleming, who became a life-long friend and correspondent. In 1770, they moved 35 miles to the southwest to Mahanaim in Dunkard's Bottom. The Christians had one son and five daughters born between 1770 and 1785: Sarah (Sally), Priscilla (Prissie), Anne, John (Johnnie), Dorothea (Dolly), and Elizabeth (Betsy).

During the American Revolutionary War, William served as a lieutenant colonel, and then was promoted to colonel, of the 1st Virginia Regiment. She accompanied her husband to Colonial Williamsburg in 1776. William led an expedition to the southwestern frontier of Virginia against the Cherokee. In letters to her brother, Governor Patrick Henry, she wrote that her husband was unable to take care of business and family obligations due to his military service.

== Kentucky County, Virginia ==
William Christian acquired land claims in Kentucky in payment for his service during the French and Indian War (also known as Seven Years' War). There were also people moving to the frontier of what is now Kentucky following the American Revolutionary War. William had a zealous interest in moving to Kentucky; Christian acquiesced to his decision. As was common for the time, women generally had a lack of influence on decision-making.

Christian's family and a number of their enslaved people traveled the Wilderness Road to Kentucky in the spring of 1785. There were some of their enslaved workers who went to Kentucky ahead of them.

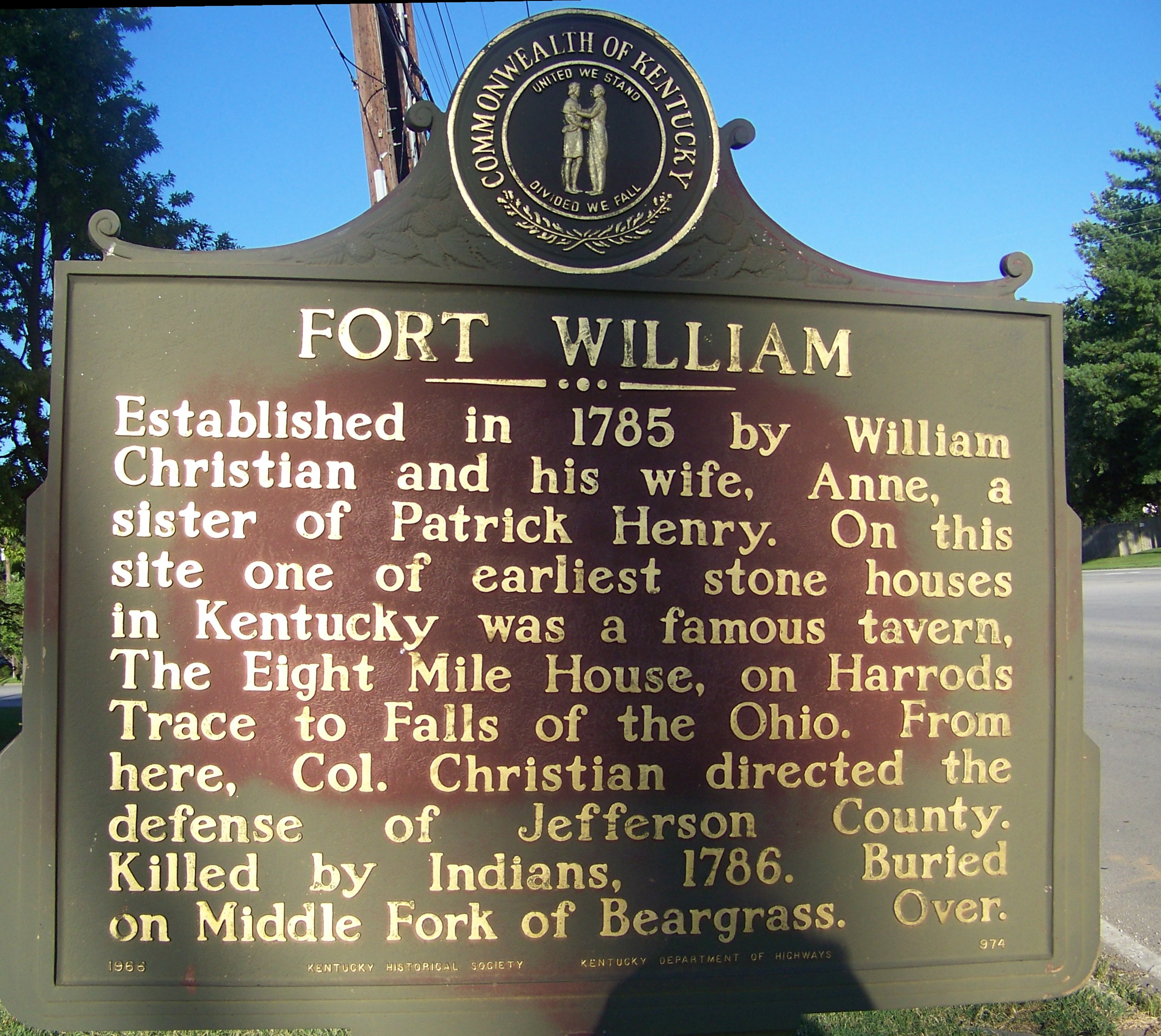
Fort William historic marker

They settled near present-day Louisville on Beargrass Creek in August of that year. William operated a saltworks near present-day Shepherdsville, where some of his enslaved people worked. The saltworks, located in Saltsburg or Bullitt's Lick, (Note: At the time, they lived in what was Kentucky County of western Virginia.) was "one of the largest and most important early businesses in Kentucky". Salt was an important commodity on the frontier and was used as a form of cash. Salt was used by households and the military to preserve meat.

To Ann Fleming, her sister-in-law, she wrote of the travel to Kentucky, they "came through the wilderness… the roads are bad beyond description & the weather is so violently hot & such great scarcity of water." She told her mother-in-law Elizabeth Starke Christian of Bellmont, Botetourt County (now Roanoke County) that she "never saw any trouble until I came to this country."

In the spring and summer of 1785, there were numerous raids by Native Americans who resisted settlement by Anglo-Americans. There were attacks on travelers and settlers and horses were stolen, but it was difficult to mobilize and coordinate local militias to fight against the Native American tribes. Since Kentucky was not yet its own state, a military expedition required approval from the capital of Virginia.

In February 1786, their daughter Priscilla married Alexander Scott Bullitt, who came to the Louisville area ca. 1783.

William participated in an exhibition north of the Ohio River. He was shot and killed on April 9, 1786. He knew that he had a mortal wound, but hoped to reach home before he died, but he died after traveling just a few miles. Her brother, Patrick Henry, wrote to her following the death of his good friend, "I am at loss how to address you my dearest sister. Would to God I could say something to give relief to the dearest of women & sisters." In her letters to loved ones, she expressed that it was very difficult to live in the wilderness, removed from friends and family. She was "devastated by breaking home ties," a feeling that became more significant after her husband's death.

Alexander Bullitt was an executor of his estate. He also oversaw the estate. William had left "ample support" for the family and Annie managed the family's finances so that they remained financially independent as well as to plan for her children's future. Initially, she took over the operation of the salt mine. She then rented out the salt mine for income. In the event that she died, she planned on leaving the enslaved people to her children, who could hire them out for income. Christian told her brother that if anything happened to her, she wanted Patrick and their brother-in-law Col. Samuel Meredith Jr. to raise the children in eastern Virginia. Their land in the west was to be sold and the money used for the children's education.

While she was married, her husband alone managed the family's finances. As a widowed woman, she attained the legal status of feme sole which meant that she could enter into contracts, buy and sell property, and be sued in court. (Note: Her eldest son was five years of age. If she had a son who came of age, he would be responsible for the financial business. She had a son-in-law, Alexander Scott Bullitt, who was married to Priscilla, who would have been expected to step in to this patriarchal role. Unlike her peers, Christian had managed the family's finances when her husband was away. After her husband's death she became proficient at managing the business and workers.) She is one of several women—like Martha Washington and Catharine Flood McCall—who oversaw significant business operations that relied on slave labor in the late 1700s and early 1800s.

Christian moved to the Danville, Kentucky area after her husband's death. She first stayed with Rosanna Christian Wallace and Caleb Wallace. Rosanna was William's sister. Then, she settled with her five youngest children at Cove Spring in the fall of 1786. In September 1787, she rented a plantation. She managed the family's finances to protect her children's inheritance.

== Virginia ==
She returned to Virginia with five of her children in September 1788. With them were a few enslaved people. Christian became ill with consumption or tuberculosis in the spring of 1789.

== Death ==
After making out her will in October 1789, she sailed to Antigua in the West Indies in the hope that she would recover. She returned to Virginia in the spring of 1790 and died on May 4 in Norfolk, Virginia. She may have been buried at Beargrass Creek alongside her husband; her son provided £400 in his will for tombstones for his parents there. Her daughters later returned to Kentucky.

== Legacy ==
Christian wrote letters of the family's journey to Kentucky to Anne Christian Fleming. The letters provide first-person accounts of their movements along Wilderness Road and establishing a house on Beargrass Creek: "Her letters, which her sister-in-law preserved, strongly influenced later generations' understandings of the effects on women of the westward movement and life on the frontier," according to biographer Gail S. Terry. Her letters are particularly important because there is little first-hand accounts of the lives of women during westward expansion of the 18th century.

Christian corresponded frequently with her brother Patrick Henry, sister-in-law Ann Fleming, and her mother-in-law Elizabeth Christian. After her husband died, she also corresponded about financial issues with her husband's friends and business associates, including Governor William Fleming (married to Ann Christian Fleming) and Caleb Wallace.

Letters and papers of William and Annie Henry Christian dated 1764-1790 are held by The Filson Historical Society in the Bullitt Family Papers – Oxmoor Collection, 1683–2003. William Marshall Bullitt, a descendant of Priscilla Christian and Alexander Scott Bullitt, also collected Christian's letters. The collection included wills, estate records, and business records and receipts of land purchases and other financial transactions.

The Virginia Historical Society has also archived her letters. They are held in the collection of Hugh Blair Grigsby, president of the Virginia Historical Society and a collector in the 19th century. For Grigsby, the letters were particularly important because of who she wrote to, like Patrick Henry and Caleb Wallace.

== Bibliography ==
- Garrett, Alexi (2019). "Pious Widow, Loving Mother, Slave Owner, Salt Mine Manager, and Patrick Henry's Beloved Sister: A Brief History of Annie Henry Christian" (PDF). News from Red Hill. The Patrick Henry Memorial Foundation.
- Sachs, Honor R. (Winter 2008). "Reconstructing a Life: The Archival Challenges of Women's History" (PDF). Library Trends. Alternative Print Culture: Social History and Libraries. Vol. 56, no. 3. The Board of Trustees, University of Illinois – via CORE.
