= Land surveying in Kentucky =

Land surveying in Kentucky is the practice of land surveying in the Commonwealth of Kentucky.

== Consumer information ==
=== Survey types ===
- Boundary Survey: In this type of survey, property corners will be located and verified, or reset. The improvements on the property will be located and a check for violations or encroachments onto or from the subject property will be made. This survey may be used by the property owner for the construction of a fence or other improvement. Flood plain certification is restricted to a review of the Flood Insurance Rate Maps (FIRM), and shall not be construed as a confirmation or denial of flooding potential.
- Mortgage Inspection: The purpose of this inspection is to obtain mortgage title insurance. It is a location of improvements and cursory check for violations or encroachments onto or from the subject property based on existing but not confirmed evidence. This does not constitute a boundary survey; no property corners will be set and, it should not be used or relied upon for the establishment of any fence, structure or other improvement. Flood plain certification is restricted to a review of the FIRM and shall not be construed as a confirmation or denial of flooding potential.
- ALTA/ACSM Survey: This is the most comprehensive type of survey and improvement location. It covers all the aspects of the boundary survey and improvement location and identification for any additional evidence of possession or use which could be adverse to the interest of the purchaser. This survey may include definitive statements regarding the flooding potential in addition to a review of FIRM.

=== Choosing a surveyor ===
Each of Kentucky's 120 counties elects a county surveyor. However, a consumer can seek services from any licensed Kentucky professional land surveyor. The status of a licensee or firm can be verified online, including checking for disciplinary actions in the past 5 years.

=== Right of entry ===
Land surveyors and employees that are under the supervision of a professional land surveyor have the right of entry on land owned by others.

=== State regulation ===
Land surveying in Kentucky is regulated by the Commonwealth in KRS 322. The Standards of Practice are defined in 201 KAR 18:150. Compliance is maintained by the Kentucky Board of Engineers and Land Surveyors, which was established by an Act of the Kentucky General Assembly in 1938.

== Land systems in Kentucky ==
All chain of title in the Commonwealth traces back to Virginia land patents and Kentucky land patents. The Secretary of State maintains the security and preservation of these historical documents. More recent Deed and Plat records are maintained by Kentucky's County Clerks.

Most of the state utilizes the metes and bounds land system, which is based on English Common Law and reflects the Commonwealth's original status as a part of Virginia until statehood in 1792. Parts of Western Kentucky, since it was acquired under the Jackson Purchase in 1818, utilizes a rectangular system based on the Public Land Survey System created by the Land Ordinance of 1785.

Common surveying measures in Kentucky include acre and the survey foot, which are both now referenced in decimal and historically in fraction. For example, a modern survey should list a distance of one-foot and six-inches as 1.50 feet. Historically lengths were also measured as chain and rod. A rod is also known as a pole, both being 16.5 feet. A chain is most commonly 66 feet (4 poles) but can also be 33 feet (2 poles).

== Technology ==
Modern technology used in surveying in Kentucky includes GPS, the total station, and CAD. Surveying is also aided by the development of Geographic information systems, such as LOJIC.

== Kentucky Association of Professional Surveyors (KAPS) ==
The Kentucky Association of Professional Surveys (KAPS) is an organization for members having common professional problems and interests. The organization provides forums for discussion and action for better professional recognition, status and conditions of employment.

== Notable Kentucky surveyors ==
Notable surveyors in Kentucky history include Daniel Boone, Abraham Lincoln, Thomas Bullitt, George Rogers Clark, and Isaac Shelby.

== See also ==
- Land Ordinance of 1785
