= Joshua Fry Bullitt Jr. =

American lawyer

Member of the Kentucky House of Representatives from Jefferson County
- In office August 3, 1885 – August 1, 1887
- Preceded by: David Meriwether
- Succeeded by: E. D. Briscoe

Personal details
- Party: Democratic

Joshua Fry Bullitt Jr. (July 24, 1856 – April 20, 1932) was a Virginia lawyer who practiced in Big Stone Gap, Virginia. He was one of the leading citizens of Southwest Virginia in the late 19th and early 20th centuries, both as a practicing lawyer and as a political figure. His prominence corresponded with the rise of the coal business in central Appalachia. His legacy includes both the continuation of the energy companies that he helped to create and the careers of the prominent legal figures who worked with and learned from him, just as he was the heir to a series of accomplished legal figures. As the leader of a citizen police force, he was the model for a character in one of the best-selling novels in the United States in the first half of the 20th century.

== Biography ==
Born in Jefferson County, Kentucky, Bullitt was the son of Joshua Fry Bullitt, a former Chief Justice of the Kentucky Court of Appeals. His ancestors included Colonel John Henry, father of Patrick Henry, Joshua Fry of the College of William & Mary, the Southwest Virginia explorer Thomas Walker, and his great-grandfather, Alexander Scott Bullitt, for whom Bullitt County, Kentucky was named. His first cousins included William Marshall Bullitt, who served as United States Solicitor General during the Taft administration and who refurbished the family's ancestral home, Oxmoor Farm. Joshua Bullitt Jr. won a scholarship to attend Washington & Lee University, graduating in 1876. He learned law from his father, and from former U.S. Attorney General James Speed, and by attending the summer lectures of Professor John B. Minor of the University of Virginia Law School, before starting out as a lawyer in 1880. Bullitt served in the Kentucky legislature in 1884 and 1885 and ran for Congress in Virginia in 1896 against incumbent James A. Walker.

After seven years as a lawyer in Kentucky, Bullitt moved his practice to Big Stone Gap. Big Stone Gap was conceived as a model town, viewed by some to become the "Pittsburgh of the South." Two of Bullitt's law partners went on to become prominent judges. Bullitt worked for a time in his law practice with Henry C. McDowell Jr., who later became a federal judge. Bullitt also worked as partner with Joseph L. Kelly, who served on the Virginia Supreme Court. Bullitt served as president of The Virginia Bar Association in 1911–12. Between 1890 and 1920, Bullitt and his partners represented coal companies in approximately 100 cases before the Virginia Supreme Court, most involving mineral rights or injured miners. "Around 1905 Bullitt formed a new partnership with John W. Chalkley. They found ready clients among the many new coal companies. Bullitt became one of a handful of experts on the arcane subject of Appalachian land titles." On the coal lawyer's priorities, land and labor, Bullitt was an opponent of the adoption of the Torrens system of registering land titles in Virginia, and in a speech to the bar association in 1903, Bullitt predicted the demise of labor unions, concluding that their reason for being would disappear once corporations were reformed.

Bullitt's main client was the Virginia Coal and Iron Company. The company came to own 98,510 acres (398.7 km^{2}) of land in the Lee and Wise counties of Virginia and in Harlan County, Kentucky. The Virginia Coal and Iron Company was a predecessor of the Westmoreland Coal Company and the Penn Virginia Corporation. Today, Penn Virginia is listed on the S&P 600. The papers of Bullitt's law office are included with the Westmoreland collection at the Hagley Museum and Library in Delaware. Bullitt's son-in-law, Ralph Taggart, became president of Westmoreland in 1929.

"In 1890, when the coal boom was in full swing," Bullitt "organized the Police Guard of Big Stone Gap. The Guard was formed to suppress the more raucous behavior of the mountaineers who periodically poured into town looking for excitement." The Guard and its activities were described by its most famous member, the popular author John Fox Jr. Fox used Bullitt as the model for the "Captain of the Guard" character in his best-selling book, The Trail of the Lonesome Pine, and Fox dedicated his earlier book Blue-grass and Rhododendron, published in 1901, to Bullitt and McDowell, along with Horace Ethelbert Fox, as "The First Three Captains of the Guard." The Trail of the Lonesome Pine sold more than 1.5 million copies by 1942. The "vigilance committee," as the Guard was also known, cleaned up the town in 18 months.

The most famous case involving the Guard was the disappearance of Philadelphian E.L. Wentz, a member of the family that included the principal owners of Virginia Coal and Iron Company. In 1904, when the missing body was discovered, Bullitt led his group of men into the woods to guard the remains of the victim, who had not been seen since the fall of the previous year. Bullitt represented the Wentz family at the coroner's inquest, at which the jury reached a surprise verdict that the cause of death was suicide and not homicide. Bullitt was also the commander of a National Guard unit, Company H of the 2nd Virginia Regiment, which was called to service in Mexico in 1916 and later in World War I.

Bullitt concluded his career in Philadelphia, Pennsylvania, where the owners of many of the coal companies in Wise County, Virginia were based.
