= Oxmoor Farm =

Historic house in Kentucky, United States

- Oxmoor
- U.S. National Register of Historic Places
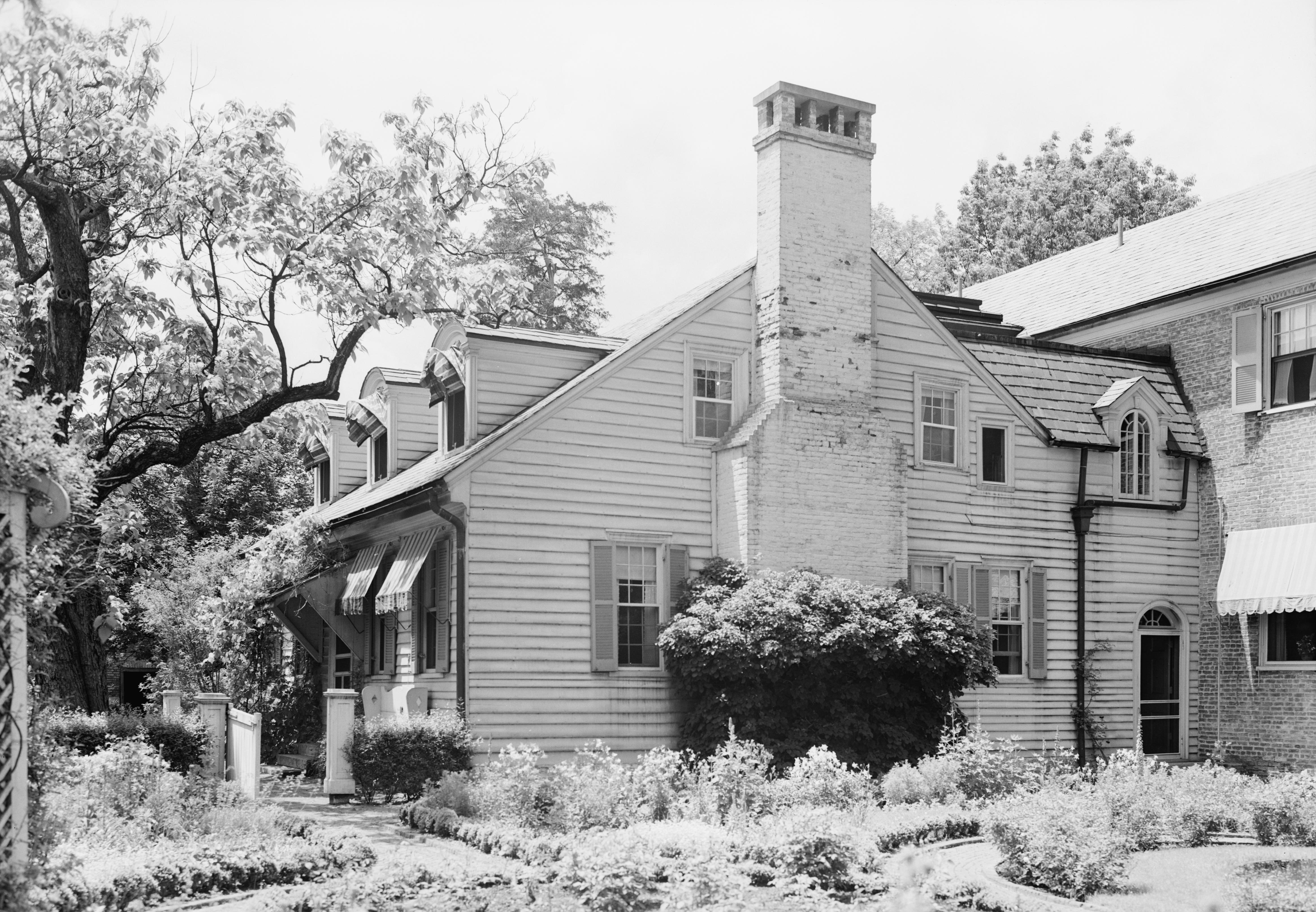
- Front of the house

- Location within Kentucky Location within the United States
- Location: Louisville, Kentucky
- Coordinates: 38°14′19″N 85°36′33″W
- Built: 1787
- Architectural style: Colonial Revival, Federal
- NRHP reference No.: 76000907
- Added to NRHP: July 13, 1976

Oxmoor Farm is an estate in Louisville, Kentucky located 8 miles (13 km) east of downtown. It was listed on the National Register of Historic Places in 1976. It has also been termed Oxmoor or the Bullitt Estate.

== History ==
Oxmoor was surveyed in 1774 and was the home of Sturgis Station fort by 1780, when it was granted to Col. William Christian. Alexander Scott Bullitt married Christian's daughter in 1786 and Christian gave the 2,000-acre (810 ha) farm to them as a wedding present. Christian was killed by Native Americans later that year.

Alexander Bullitt purchased an adjoining 1,000 acres (400 ha) in 1787 to expand the farm and named it Oxmoor after the fictional farm in Tristram Shandy, with a new house being completed in 1791, a year before Kentucky separated from Virginia to become a separate state. Alexander Bullitt became Kentucky's first Lieutenant Governor in 1800 and Bullitt County, Kentucky is named in his honor. Alexander Bullitt died in 1816 and willed the farm to his youngest son William. William Bullitt expanded the farmhouse in the late 1820s, but closed the house in 1863 and rented out the farmlands after slaves were freed in the United States under the Emancipation Proclamation. William Bullitt died in 1877 and his wife died in 1879. Then the farm was divided between their children.

From 1906 to 1909 a great-grandson of Alexander Bullitt, William Marshall Bullitt, purchased the lands from the different family owners and reopened the main house. When William Marshall Bullitt died in 1957, the farm was passed to his son Thomas Walker Bullitt under a trustee arrangement that prohibited him from selling it. In the 1960s, the farm was split under the process of eminent domain to build Interstate 64. Due to the trustee arrangement of the land, the Bullitt family formed Beargrass Corporation to manage the leasing of the land for Oxmoor Center, Oxmoor Country Club, and other commercial uses.

== See also ==
- Farmington Historic Plantation
- Historic Locust Grove
- The Filson Historical Society
- Riverside, The Farnsley-Moremen Landing — a 19th-century farm in Louisville
