= John Caldwell (Kentucky politician) =

American politician

John Caldwell (1757 in Prince Edward County, Virginia – November 9, 1804) was a Kentucky politician, state senator, and the second lieutenant governor of Kentucky serving under Governor Christopher Greenup.

He was elected to the Kentucky State Senate in 1792, and was later elected the second lieutenant governor of Kentucky in 1804. Caldwell died while presiding over the state senate in his first year as lieutenant governor from "inflammation of the brain". John Caldwell is the namesake of Caldwell County, Kentucky.

== Military contributions ==
John Caldwell was not only a statesman but an accomplished soldier, who had fought in the Revolutionary War as well as helped lead a campaign against Native American tribes with George Rogers Clark in 1786. He had served in the Battle of Fallen Timbers serving under General Anthony Wayne. In one hour, their forces defeated 2,000 Natives, allowing the Ohio Territory to be settled. This battle enabled Ohio to become a state in 1803.

== Political appointments ==
Before John Caldwell became the 2nd lieutenant Governor of Kentucky, he was Nelson county's first state senator in 1792. After this he and Reverend Terah Templin set out to expand westward and would found Logan county which would eventually become Christian county later that year. On July 16, 1798, John Caldwell was appointed by President John Quincy Adams to serve as commissioner of Christian county. In 1804 He ran for Lieutenant Governor of Kentucky and became the first Lieutenant Governor to win via popular vote.

== Notes ==
Political offices
Preceded by Alexander Scott Bullitt	Lieutenant Governor of Kentucky; 1804	Succeeded by Thomas Posey
