= Israel Christian =

American politician

- Born: c. 1720; Derry, Ireland
- Died: 1784; Pulaski County, Virginia, U.S.
- Occupations: Businessman and landowner
- Known for: Early Kentucky pioneer and landowner; founded Fincastle, Virginia and Christiansburg, Virginia.
- Spouse: Elizabeth Starke
- Children: 6 children
- Relatives: William Fleming, son-in-law Caleb Wallace, son-in-law William Bowyer, son-in-law Stephen Trigg, son-in-law

Israel Christian (c.1720–1784) was an 18th-century American frontiersman, militia officer, politician and businessman. One of the earliest landowners in Kentucky, he founded the town of Fincastle, Virginia. He was also a representative of Augusta County in the House of Burgesses from 1759 to 1761.

Four of his sons-in-law were William Fleming, William Bowyer and Stephen Trigg, all colonels in the Kentucky Militia, and Presbyterian minister Caleb Wallace. Three counties in Kentucky, as well as the Town of Christiansburg, Virginia, were named in honor of his son William Christian, and two of his sons-in-law, Fleming and Trigg.

== Biography ==
Israel Christian was born in Ireland, most likely in the Presbyterian enclave at Derry. His uncle Gilbert Christian had previously arrived in Pennsylvania in 1726 and, after living in Lancaster for a time, he and his family were among the first to settle in the Valley of Virginia in 1732. Christian was engaged in the mercantile business in Dublin when he received news of his uncle's success in the American colonies and decided to emigrate there himself in 1740. He became a successful merchant in the Staunton River area before arriving in Augusta County (now Botetourt County) around 1740. He married Elizabeth Starke, reportedly a woman of "vigorous and cultivated intellect", around 1741 or 1742 and together had six children.

He later became an officer in the Virginia Militia with the rank of captain. During the French and Indian War, he served on the 12-man war council after Augusta was attacked by the French and Shawnee in 1756. Held at the Augusta Courthouse on 27 July, the council members included Colonels John Buchanan and David Stewart, Major John Brown, Captains Joseph Colton, Robert Scott, Patrick Martin, Robert Breckenridge, James Lockhart, Samuel Stalnaker, Thomas Armstrong and his cousin William Christian. He was named "captain of horse" that same year.

From 1759 until 1761, he and John Wilson represented Augusta in the House of Burgesses. In November 1761, he became the first trustee of Staunton with nine others following its official chartering by act of assembly. During the mid-1760s, he began acquiring large tracts of land. He personally surveyed 400 acres (1.6 km^{2}) of land on Buffalo Creek where he resided during this time. In 1763, he played a major role in defending the county from an Indian raiding party which had advanced as far as Kerr's Creek. The following year, he was granted two tracts of land on Tinker Creek, 66 and 54 acres (220,000 m^{2}) respectively, on 24 June 1764. A portion of this land was later donated by him to found Fincastle, Virginia.

In November 1767, he and John Buchanan caused an official protest by members of the Staunton trustees after the two refused to sign a declaration "to be comfortable to the doctrine and discipline of the Church of England". After Buchanan died, he was supported by Major Robert Breckenridge although they were both replaced when the incident came up again in 1769. In the fall of 1768, he bought 81 acres (330,000 m^{2}) of land on a south branch of Catawba from John Bowman. He later donated this land for the construction of public buildings including the first courthouse in Botetourt County.

He and Breckenridge served as justices on the first county court held in Augusta on 13 February 1770. Two years later, he donated 40 acres (160,000 m^{2}) of land to the justices for the use of the county and on which Fincastle, Virginia was established in 1772. He left the area sometime after and retired to Christiansburg, Virginia where he died at his estate in Dunkard's Bottom, adjoining New River in present-day Pulaski County. His last will and testament was read at Montgomery County, Virginia on 12 July 1784 and witnessed by Robert Currin, Priscilla Christian, James McCorkle and Francis Preston.
