= Bullet train =

Bullet train may refer to:

== Rail ==
- High-speed rail, a type of rail transport network utilizing trains that run significantly faster than those of traditional rail
  - China Railway High-speed
  - Shinkansen, a network of high-speed trains in Japan nicknamed "bullet train"
  - High-speed rail in India

=== Rail topics named "Bullet" ===
- Caribou (train), a passenger train formerly used in Newfoundland and colloquially referred to as The Newfie Bullet
- Bullet, a former passenger train of the Central Railroad of New Jersey
- Bullet (interurban), a high-speed U.S. interurban rail car inaugurated in 1931
- Bathurst Bullet, a passenger train connecting Sydney and Bathurst, Australia

== Arts and media ==
- The Bullet Train (Shinkansen Daibakuha), a 1975 Japanese film
- Bullet Train (band), a Japanese boyband
- Bulletrain, a Swedish hard rock band
- "Bullet Train" (song), a song by Judas Priest
- Bullet Train (novel), a 2010 novel by Kōtarō Isaka
  - Bullet Train (film), a 2022 film based on the novel
    - Bullet Train (soundtrack), the 2022 soundtrack made for the film

== Other uses ==
- Bullet Train for Australia, a defunct political party in Australia

== See also ==
- Bullet (disambiguation)
- Train (disambiguation)
