= Bullet Galaxy =

Galaxy in the galaxy cluster RXC J2359.3-6042

Observation data (J2000.0 epoch)
- Right ascension: 23^{h} 59.3^{m}
- Declination: −60° 42′
- Redshift: 0.096
- Distance: 1.3 Gly (400 Mpc)
- Group or cluster: ACO 4096

Other designations
- Bullet Galaxy, RXC J2359.3-6042 CC, ACO 4067 CC, Abell 4067 CC, A 4067 CC

The Bullet Galaxy (RXC J2359.3-6042 CC) is a galaxy in the galaxy cluster RXC J2359.3-6042 (Abell 4067 or ACO 4067). It is named after the Bullet Cluster. The Bullet Galaxy is a plowing into a cluster, similar to the merging events of the Bullet Cluster and the Bullet Group. Unlike those two mergers, the Bullet Galaxy's merger is between one galaxy and a galaxy cluster. The cluster merger is happening at a lower speed than the Bullet Cluster, thus allowing the core of the Bullet Galaxy to retain cool gas and remain relatively undisturbed by its passage through the larger cluster. This cluster merger is the first one observed between a single galaxy and a cluster. The galaxy and cluster lie at redshift z=0.0992, some 1.4×10^{9} ly (4.3×10^{8} pc) away. The galaxy is traveling through the cluster at a speed of 1,310 km/s (2,900,000 mph).

By studying this unique merging researchers can gain insight on dark matter, and how it interacts with other objects in space. According to astrophysicist James Bullock, "Galaxy clusters that are merging with each other represent interesting laboratories for this kind of question,” when he was speaking of dark matter and the Bullet cluster.
