= TrikeBuggy Delta =

Delta, Bullet & Transformer
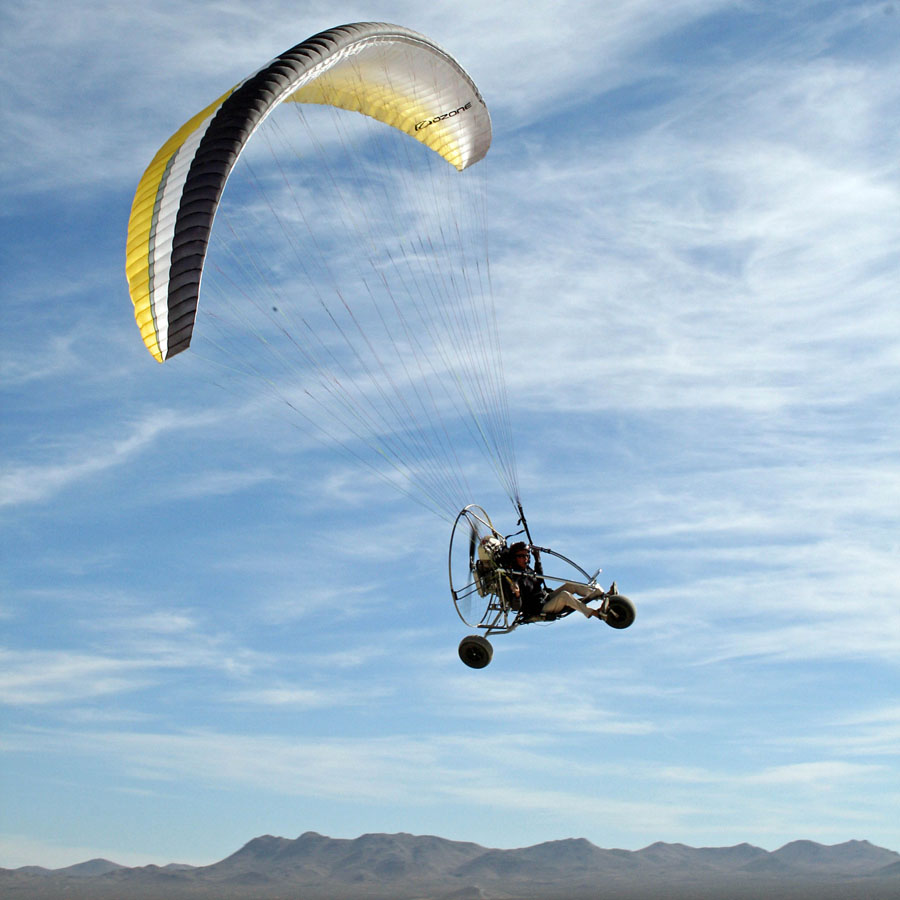
- TrikeBuggy Bullet

General information
- Type: Ultralight trike and powered parachute
- National origin: United States
- Manufacturer: TrikeBuggy
- Status: In production (2013)

The TrikeBuggy Delta, Bullet and Transformer are a family of American ultralight trikes and powered parachutes, designed and produced by TrikeBuggy of Santa Barbara, California. The aircraft is supplied complete and ready-to-fly.

== Design and development ==
The TrikeBuggy family uses one carriage as the basis for their Delta ultralight trike, Bullet powered parachute and Transformer model, which can mount either wing. The carriage can also be used unpowered as the "Kite" model, drawn along on the ground by a parafoil kite in high wind conditions.

The aircraft was designed to comply with the US FAR 103 Ultralight Vehicles rules, including the category's maximum empty weight of 254 lb (115 kg).

In Delta mode it features a cable-braced hang glider-style high-wing, weight-shift controls, a single-seat open cockpit with a small cockpit fairing, tricycle landing gear and a single engine in pusher configuration.

The carriage is made from welded stainless steel, with the single surface wing made from bolted-together aluminum tubing and covered in Dacron sailcloth. Its 35.1 ft (10.7 m) span Wills Wing Falcon 3 Tandem wing is supported by a single tube-type kingpost and uses an "A" frame weight-shift control bar. The powerplant is an air-cooled, four-stroke, 23 hp (17 kW) Briggs & Stratton engine.

A number of different hang glider wings can be fitted to the basic carriage, including the Wills Wing Falcon 3 Tandem, North Wing Status 17 and the Gibbogear Manta.

== Variants ==
Bullet
Model which mounts a paraglider wing.
Delta
Model which mounts a hang glider wing.
Kite
Model which deletes the engine and mounts a parafoil kite for ground propulsion.
Transformer
Model which mounts a hang glider or a paraglider wing.

== Specifications (Delta) ==
Data from Bayerl

General characteristics

- Crew: one
- Wingspan: 35 ft 1 in (10.7 m)
- Wing area: 228 sq ft (21.2 m^{2})
- Empty weight: 71 lb (32 kg) carriage only, less wing and engine
- Fuel capacity: 5 U.S. gallons (19 L; 4.2 imp gal)
- Powerplant: 1 × Briggs & Stratton air-cooled, four stroke engine, 23 hp (17 kW)
- Propellers: 4-bladed composite
