= Bullit (song) =

Single by Watermät
- Released: June 16, 2014
- Recorded: 2014
- Genre: Deep house; Tropical house
- Length: 7:05
- Label: Spinnin' Deep
- Songwriter: Laurent Arriau
- Producer: Watermät

"Bullit" is a dance song by the French music producer Watermät. A vocal version entitled "Bullit (So Real)" was later released, but it did not chart. The music video for Bullit is about a group of hula girls in a photograph, who use their alluring looks to invite men to join them on the beach, ultimately trapping the men in the photograph with them. The main hula girl is played by Australian model Lucinda Nicholas.

== Track listing ==
Digital download
No.	Title	Length
1.	"Bullit" (radio edit)	3:35
2.	"Bullit"	7:05

== Charts ==
=== Weekly charts ===
Chart (2014–16)	Peak position
Australia (ARIA)	60
Belgium (Ultratop 50 Flanders)	2
Belgium (Ultratop 50 Wallonia)	6
France (SNEP)	66
Germany (GfK)	93
Netherlands (Dutch Top 40)	32
Netherlands (Single Top 100)	25
Scottish Singles Sales (Official Charts)	7
UK Singles (Official Charts)	15
UK Dance (Official Charts)	4

=== Year-end charts ===
Chart (2014)	Position
Belgium (Ultratop Flanders)	20
Belgium (Ultratop Wallonia)	49

== Certifications ==
Region	Certification	Certified units/sales
Belgium (BRMA)	Gold	15,000^{*}
United Kingdom (BPI)	Silver	200,000^{‡}
^{*} Sales figures based on certification alone.^{‡} Sales+streaming figures based on certification alone.

== Release history ==
Region	Date	Format	Label
Belgium	16 June 2014	Digital download	Spinnin' Deep
Australia	9 October 2014	Digital download	Spinnin' Deep
Ireland	10 October 2014	Digital download	Polydor Records
United Kingdom	12 October 2014	Digital download	Polydor Records
