= Bullet (surname) =

Bullet is a surname. Notable people with the surname include:

- Emma Bullet (1842–1914), French-American foreign correspondent
- Gabriel Bullet (1921–2011), Swiss Roman Catholic prelate
- Jean-Baptiste Bullet (1669–1775), French writer and professor
- Pierre Bullet (c. 1639–1716), French architect
