= The Weekly Ringer =

Student newspaper of the University of Mary Washington

- Type: Student newspaper
- School: University of Mary Washington
- Founded: 1922
- Headquarters: Fredericksburg, Virginia
- Website: theweeklyringer.com

The Weekly Ringer is the University of Mary Washington's official weekly student newspaper. Founded as The Bullet in 1922, the editors of the paper changed the name to The Blue and Gray Press in 2018 and to its present name in 2022. Located in Fredericksburg, Virginia, the student publication is printed every Friday, and distributed to the UMW undergraduate campus.

== History ==
Founded as The Bullet in 1922 at Mary Washington College. Located in Fredericksburg, Virginia, the student publication is printed every Friday, and distributed to the college's undergraduate campus.

In the summer of 2014, The Bullet announced on its Facebook page that the newspaper was being relaunched as The Blue and Gray Press. In an interview with Campus Reform, editor-in-chief Alison Thoet criticized The Bullet as a name that "propagated violence" and said, "In this day and age, no one really cares about the Civil War," referring to the previous name's allusion to Fredericksburg's history as a major U.S. Civil War battlefield.

The name change was met with some controversy among the student body, alumni, and online as the story was reported by news outlets and blogs, prompting the board to pen an open letter clarifying its reasoning: "The Blue & Gray Press is a symbol of the school it serves and the locale in which it publishes." Some alumni and students responded to the letter, criticizing the board's decision to rename the paper after nearly a century as The Bullet. "I was a proud member of the class of '88. A bit less proud now," one commenter wrote. "Shame on you. Error and hypocrisy. Abandon history for political correctness stating reasons which are wrong to begin with."

"The Blue" and "the Gray" commonly refer to the two sides who fought in the United States Civil War. The soldiers of the United States of America (U.S., U.S.A., Union, North, Yankees) wore dark blue uniforms. The officers of the Confederate States of America (C.S.A., Confederacy, South, Rebels) wore gray uniforms. The Battle of Fredericksburg, Virginia was fought both on and near the current site of the University of Mary Washington.

The name of the paper was changed again in 2022 to The Weekly Ringer.

== Awards ==
The publication has received numerous awards from the Society of Professional Journalists and the Associated Collegiate Press and Newspaper Association of America Foundation.

Society of Professional Journalists

- Mark of Excellence – 1st Place, 2003
- Mark of Excellence – 2nd Place, 2002

Associated Collegiate Press and Newspaper Association of America Foundation

- The Newspaper Pacemaker Finalist Award –1994
