= Riverside, The Farnsley–Moremen Landing =

Historic house in Kentucky, United States

- Farnsley–Moremen House
- U.S. National Register of Historic Places
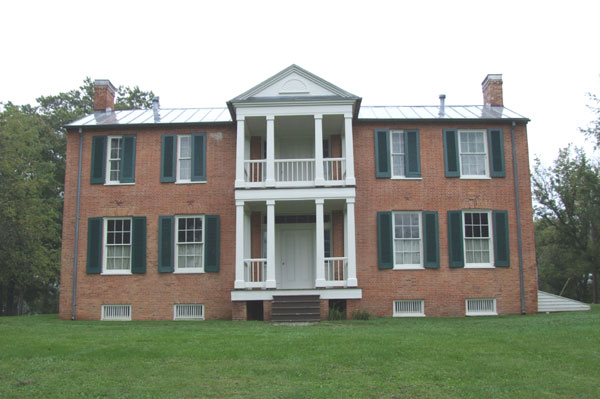
- Farnsley–Moremen house
- Interactive map of Farnsley–Moremen House
- Location: 7410 Moorman Road; Louisville, Kentucky 40272
- Coordinates: 38°5′52″N 85°53′51″W
- Area: 5 acres (2.0 ha)
- Built: c. 1838
- Website: riverside-landing.org
- NRHP reference No.: 79003117
- Added to NRHP: April 20, 1979

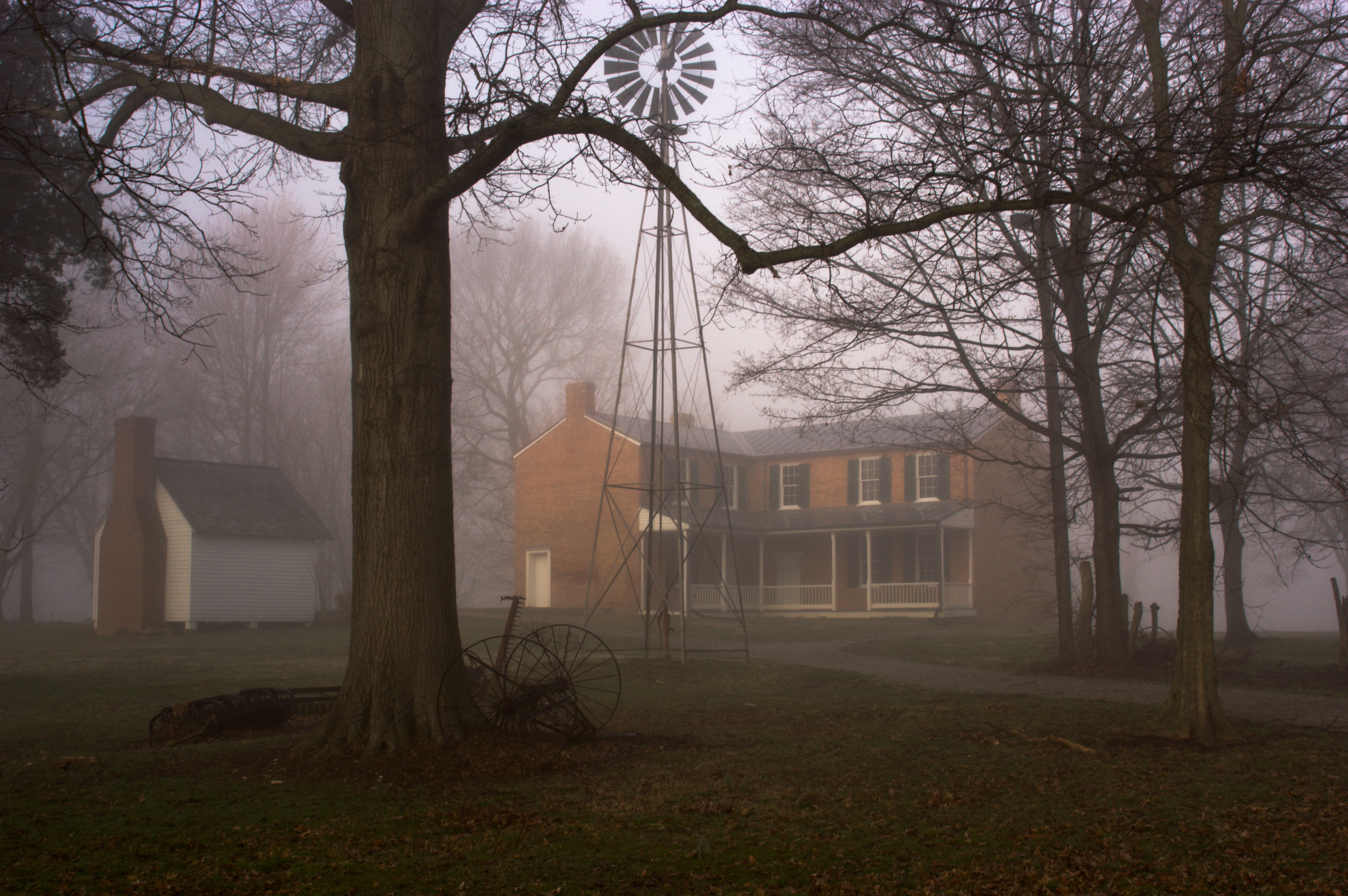
The back of the Farnsley–Moreman house on a foggy late winter morning

Riverside, The Farnsley–Moremen Landing is a historic 300-acre (120 ha) farm and house in south end Louisville, Kentucky, along the banks of the Ohio River. The house is a red brick I-house with a two-story Greek Revival.

The house was listed on the National Register of Historic Places in 1979 as Farnsley-Moremen House.

A visitors center situated on the property houses an auditorium, museum exhibits and a store.

== History ==
The house was built by enslaved people, with as many as 15 enslaved working and living on the property. Farnsley died in 1849 without a will, and after a dozen years of legal wrangling over his estate by his family, the ownership of the property was purchased by the successful Moremen family of Brandenburg in 1862. Alanson and Rachel Moremen implemented a very successful farming operation that spanned decades and increased the size of the farm to 1,500 acres (610 ha), making it into one of the largest working farms in Jefferson County.

From around 1862 to 1900, the property served as a river transportation hub. A riverboat landing on the property allowed people traveling by river to stop to trade goods, pick up boiler wood for fuel, or rest. The Moremen family nicknamed the landing "Soap Landing", as they sold lye soap and other household and agricultural products there. In addition, a ferry carried people and goods back and forth between the landing and Indiana. They would build a float barge and load full of agricultural products and livestock and float down the river to New Orleans. With the money earned would sow into their pants, buy horses and return home. One year Henry Clay rode the float barge stumping for President Abraham Lincoln. Long in his oration at every stop they ran into very cold conditions. The barge was frozen in place and all goods had to be unloaded and sold.

Like many other structures along the Ohio River, the house was damaged by the Ohio River flood of 1937. After the county condemned a portion of the property to build a retention wall that left the historical farm outside the wall stripped of its top soil, the future became unclear for the family.

The Moremen family managed the property until 1988, when they sold it to Jefferson County Fiscal Court for purposes of restoration, promotion and preservation of the families history. On October 10, 1993, the restored house was debuted to the public.

== See also ==
- Farmington Historic Plantation
- Historic Locust Grove
- List of attractions and events in the Louisville metropolitan area
- List of museums in the Louisville metropolitan area
- List of parks in the Louisville metropolitan area
- Oxmoor Farm – larger historical farm in the Louisville area
