= Cuthbert Bullitt =

American planter and lawyer

Member of the Virginia House of Delegates from Prince William County
- In office October 17, 1785 – June 22, 1788 Serving with Arthur Lee, Daniel Carrroll Brent, Ludwell Lee
- Preceded by: Alexander Scott Bullitt
- Succeeded by: Henry Washington
- In office October 7, 1776 – May 3, 1778 Serving with Jesse Ewell
- Succeeded by: Burr Harrison

Personal details
- Born: c. 1740 Fauquier County, Virginia
- Died: 1791 Mount View Plantation; Prince William County, Virginia
- Spouse: Helen Scott
- Children: 6 (including Alexander Scott Bullitt)
- Parent(s): Benjamin Bullitt; Elizabeth Harrison
- Relatives: Thomas Bullitt (brother)
- Occupation: Lawyer, judge, planter

Cuthbert Bullitt (c. 1740 – 1791) was an American colonial planter and lawyer from Prince William County, Virginia. During the American Revolution, he was a local and colonial politician, and voted against ratification of the U.S. Constitution at the Virginia Ratification Convention.

== Early and family life ==
Bullitt was born on his parents' plantation in Fauquier County, Virginia, and was descended from French Huguenots. His grandfather, Benjamin Bullett (so spelled at the time), was from Languedoc in southern France, and emigrated across the Atlantic Ocean to escape the religious restriction of Huguenots after the Edict of Fontainebleau. He settled in the Province of Maryland in 1685 and operated a plantation near Port Tobacco in Charles County. His son Benjamin married Elizabeth Harrison, descended from the First Families of Virginia. They had five children, including Cuthbert.

He and his brother, Thomas Bullitt, both settled in Prince William County and became locally prominent—Cuthbert as a planter and lawyer and Thomas as a soldier who commanded local troops westward on military and exploratory journeys.

In 1760 Cuthbert Bullitt married Helen Scott (1739–1795), eldest daughter of Rev. James Scott (d.1782) of Dettingen parish, whose uncle Rev. Alexander Scott (1686–1733) of then-vast Overwharton Parish (now Aquia Church) had received considerable land in Fauquier and Prince William Counties from Lord Fairfax. Although two of her brothers drowned at sea, three continued the Scott family's military and legal traditions. James Scott became a Virginia legislator and Revolutionary soldier; Rev. John Scott (a Maryland Loyalist) later briefly served as rector of Dettingen parish and his son became state senator and judge John Scott (1781–1850): Gustavus Scott would become an early commissioner laying out the new federal city in the District of Columbia further upstream along the Potomac River. The Bullitts had six children: Alexander Scott Bullitt (who also served in the House of Delegates and became a pioneer settler in Louisville, Kentucky), Thomas James, Frances, Sarah, Helen, and Sophia.

== Career ==
Bullitt developed his plantation, known as Mount View, on a peninsula where Quantico Creek enters the Potomac River. He also donated land which became the town of Dumfries, which was a port for shipping tobacco until it silted up after his man's lifetime.

On 24 September 1765 Bullitt shot and killed Virginia Burgess John Baylis in a duel. Baylis had insulted Bullitt's brother-in-law, then 18-year old John Scott. He was acquitted on grounds of self defense.

As the American Revolutionary War neared, Bullitt became active politically, as did his militia officer brother Thomas as well as his Scott in-laws, among others. Bullitt joined Prince William County's Committee of Safety as did Lynaugh Helm and Henry Lee III. In 1776 Prince William County voters elected Bullitt and Lee as the county's delegates to the fifth Virginia Revolutionary Convention. That meeting became a constitutional convention, producing an interim constitution used by the new Commonwealth for the next several years.

Serving the new state government, Bullitt became the Commonwealth Attorney (prosecutor) in Prince William County. He also served several terms part-time as one of Prince William County's representatives in the Virginia House of Delegates. Fellow legislators elected Bullitt a state court judge in 1780. He then let his eldest son Alexander Scott Bullitt gain legislative experience, but after his son relocated to Kentucky, Bullett resumed his part-time legislative service. His last quasi-legislative service was in 1788, when Bullitt represented Prince William county with William Grayson during the Virginia Ratifying Convention concerning the United States Constitution. Both Prince William County delegates conformed with fellow planter George Mason (who owned plantations and a ferry in Prince William County but represented Stafford County), and voted against ratification.

Bullitt patented 8000 acres on the north fork of Licking Creek in Kentucky in 1788. His name is spelled three ways in the 1787 state tax census. Nonresident "Cuthbert Bullet" owned land and no slaves in Botetourt County, Virginia (near his late brother's area of exploration); nonresident ""Cuthbert Bullitt" owned 19 enslaved people older than 16 and 25 under that age in Fauquier County (where he was born and his father had owned land), and "Cuthbert Bullett" owned five enslaved adults and nine children in Prince William County.

== Death and legacy ==
Judge Bullitt died at his Mount View plantation in 1791. His will was dated May 16, 1791.
