= William Christian (Virginia politician) =

American officer and politician (c.1742 – 1786)

Member of the Virginia Senate from Botetourt, Washington, Jefferson, Fayette, Lincoln and Greenbrier Counties
- In office May 7, 1781 – May 2, 1784

Member of the Virginia Senate from Botetourt, Washington, Greenbrier and Kentucky Counties
- In office May 1, 1780 – May 6, 1781

Member of the Virginia Senate from Botetourt and Fincastle Counties
- In office October 7, 1776 – May 4, 1777
- Succeeded by: William Fleming

Member of the House of Burgesses from Fincastle County
- In office 1773 – 1774 Serving with Robert Doak, Stephen Trigg

Personal details
- Born: c. 1742 Staunton, Augusta County, Colony of Virginia
- Died: April 9, 1786 Illinois Country
- Spouse: Annie Henry Christian
- Children: William Henry Christian and at least 4 daughters
- Parent(s): Israel Christian, Elizabeth Starke
- Occupation: Military officer, pioneer, planter, politician

William Christian (c. 1742 – April 9, 1786) was a military officer, planter and politician from the western part of the Colony of Virginia. He represented Fincastle County in the House of Burgesses and as relations with Britain soured, signed the Fincastle Resolutions. He later represented western Virginia in the Virginia Senate and founded Fort William (now Louisville, Kentucky), as well as helped negotiate the Treaty of Long Island of the Holston, which made peace between the Overmountain Men and Cherokees in 1777. He was killed in 1786 at the outset of the Northwest Indian War, leading an expedition against Native Americans near what is now Jeffersonville, Indiana.

== Early and family life ==
Christian was born about 1742, in Augusta County, Virginia. He was the son of Elizabeth Starke and her husband Israel Christian, immigrants from Ireland who settled in Staunton, Virginia, in 1740, where they operated a general store. Israel Christian represented Augusta County in the Virginia House of Burgesses multiple times between 1758 and 1765, and helped found the towns of Christiansburg and Fincastle. William Christian and his sisters received an "unusually good" education, perhaps from their mother.

As a young man, Christian served as a captain in the Anglo-Cherokee War (1758–1761) under Colonel William Byrd. In the mid-1760s, he read law under the guidance of Patrick Henry, although there is no evidence Christian ever practiced law. He married Henry's sister, Annie. They had several daughters who married and had children; their only son, William Henry Christian, died in 1800 at about age 19 without marrying.

== Career ==
Christian lived in the part of Botetourt County, Virginia that became Fincastle County, Virginia. He was one of the new county's two representatives in the House of Burgesses in its last three sessions, from 1773 to 1775. In 1774, Christian commanded a regiment of militia from Fincastle County in Dunmore's War, but he and his troops arrived too late to participate in the decisive Battle of Point Pleasant.

As relations with Britain soured, Christian became one of the signers of the Fincastle Resolutions, the earliest statement of armed resistance to the British Crown in the American colonies. In 1775, as the American Revolutionary War neared, Christian served on the Fincastle Committee of Safety and was elected to represent the county at the first four of the five Virginia Conventions after Virginia's royal governor, Lord Dunmore, dismissed the legislature. After the fifth revolutionary convention established the Commonwealth of Virginia, voters from Botetourt and Fincastle counties elected Christian as their representative in the Virginia Senate. However, in the next session, the district boundaries changed, with Botetourt County joining Washington, Montgomery, Greenbrier and Kentucky counties in a district that elected William Fleming as their state senator for a four-year part time term. Christian soon returned, after yet another boundary change as settlers moved southwest along the Cumberland Road through Washington County and Greenbrier County into what was first Kentucky County, then Jefferson, Fayette, and Lincoln Counties—all before Kentucky became a state in its own right.

On February 13, 1776, he was appointed lieutenant colonel of the 1st Virginia Regiment. Christian's brother-in-law Patrick Henry was the initial colonel in command, but when the regiment was taken into the Continental Army, Henry declined to continue serving, and so Congress promoted Christian to colonel on March 18, 1776. When British-allied Cherokees under Dragging Canoe and Oconostota went to war with Virginia in 1776, Christian resigned his Continental Army commission in July, accepting instead the command of an expedition against the Overhill Cherokees. The expedition involved little combat, but Christian and his men destroyed Cherokee towns, compelling some of the chiefs to agree to peace. Christian was one of the commissioners who negotiated the "Treaty of the Long Island of the Holston" with the Cherokees, signed on July 20, 1777. He was also a commissioner in a second treaty with the Cherokees in 1781.

== Final years and legacy ==
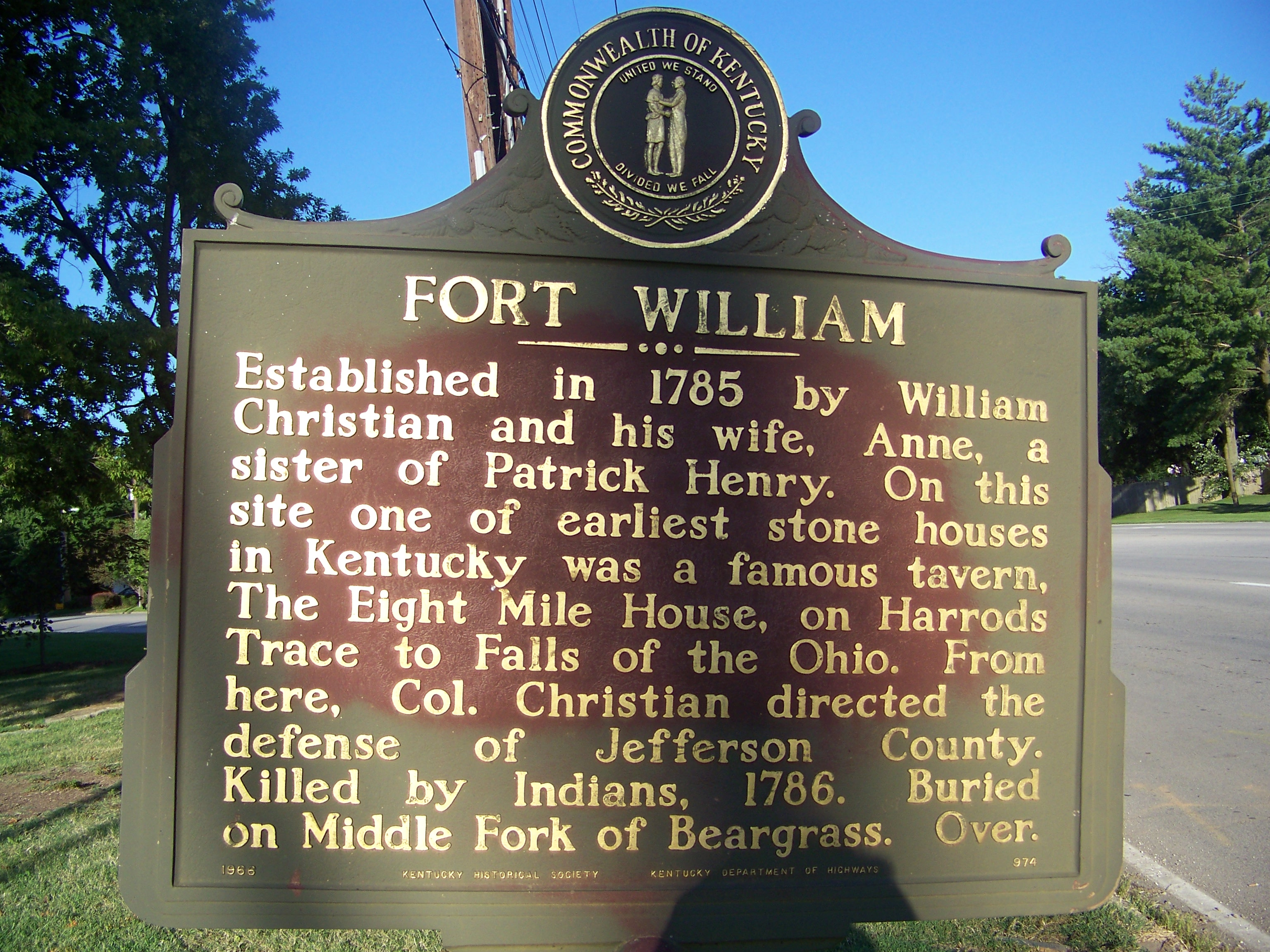
Fort William dedication plaque honoring William Christian

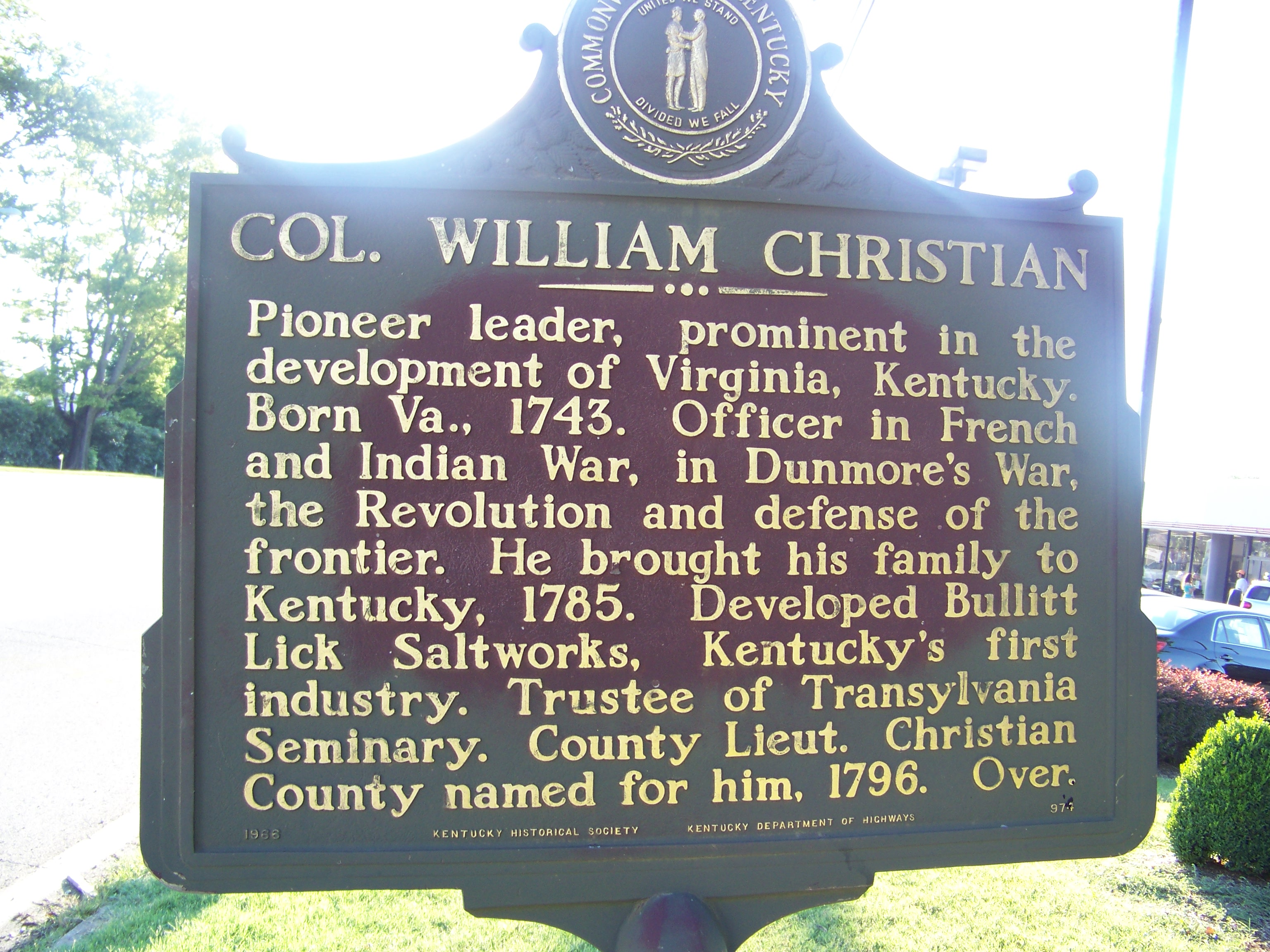

In 1785, Christian moved his family and slaves to what became Jefferson County, Kentucky, and the Louisville settlement. Christian started a plantation near fellow pioneer and politician Alexander Scott Bullitt (who married one of Christian's daughters and began a family) and executed claims for 9,000 acres (36 km^{2}) of land as a bounty for his military service.

Although the Revolutionary War had ended, Native Americans continued to defend their lands against occupation by American settlers. Christian and his wife helped establish Fort William, Kentucky, where Christian directed the defense of what is now Louisville from Native American attacks. As one of the most experienced military officers in Kentucky, in 1786 he led an expedition against Native Americans north of the Ohio River. He was killed in a skirmish on April 9, near present-day Jeffersonville, Indiana.

Troops returned Christian's remains for burial in Jefferson County, Kentucky in the Bullitt cemetery in Oxmoor. His son would later be buried in the same graveyard. His widow moved east and died in Norfolk, Virginia, in 1790. Two of their daughters died in Jefferson County in 1806, and the youngest married Dr. William Fishback and died in 1840. The Christians' early Kentucky log house still stands.

Several places are named after him or family members, including:

- Christiansburg, Virginia
- Christian County, Illinois
- Christian County, Kentucky
- Christian County, Missouri
