= Alexander Scott Bullitt =

American politician

1st Lieutenant Governor of Kentucky
- In office 1800–1804
- Governor: James Garrard
- Preceded by: Office established
- Succeeded by: John Caldwell

Speaker of the Kentucky Senate
- In office 1792–1800
- Preceded by: Office established
- Succeeded by: Office abolished (continued as lieutenant governor)

Member of the Kentucky Senate from Jefferson County
- In office 1792–1800
- Preceded by: Office established

Member of the Virginia House of Delegates from Prince William County
- In office May 5, 1783 – October 16, 1785 Serving with Arthur Lee, William Grayson
- Preceded by: Lynaugh Helm
- Succeeded by: Cuthbert Bullitt

Personal details
- Born: 1761 Prince William County, Colony of Virginia; British Empire
- Died: April 13, 1816 (aged 54–55) Oxmoor Farm; Jefferson County, Kentucky, U.S.
- Spouse(s): Priscilla Christian (1785-1806; her death); Mary Churchill Prather
- Children: 6
- Parent(s): Cuthbert Bullitt (father); Helen Scott (mother)
- Occupation: pioneer, politician, planter

Alexander Scott Bullitt (1761 – April 13, 1816) was an American pioneer, planter, slaveowner, and politician from Virginia who became an early settler in Kentucky and a politician during the early days of Kentucky statehood.

== Early and family life ==
Bullitt's family had come to America as refugee French Huguenots in 1685. Arriving first in Maryland, part of the family settled in Prince William County, Virginia. Alexander was born there in 1761, the son of colonial planter and politician Cuthbert Bullitt and Helen (Scott) Bullitt. His father owned plantations and slaves, as well as was a major lawyer involved with local and colonial affairs. Alexander's early schooling was directed at making him a lawyer. His uncle Thomas Bullitt was a pioneer and military officer, involved with western exploration.

== Career ==
At first, Bullitt emulated his father's career, serving part-time in the Virginia House of Delegates representing Prince William County.

=== Settling in Kentucky ===
However, his family's land claims and investments serving as an example, in 1784 he relocated over the Cumberland Road to Kentucky. Bullitt settled first in an area that became Shelby County but soon found the area too isolated and subject to raids from Native Americans.

Thus he relocated toward the Ohio River. His late uncle Thomas Bullitt, after commanding the Virginia militia westward during Dunmore's War, had returned to the Falls of the Ohio and surveyed a town site in 1773. In 1780 the Virginia legislature incorporated the new town and named it Louisville. Alexander bought 1000 acres (4 km^{2}) about 9 miles (14 km) south of Louisville and began clearing another farm. He named the plantation Oxmoor, after the fictional farm of the novel The Life and Opinions of Tristram Shandy, Gentleman.

In August 1785, his neighbor, Colonel William Christian, who had represented Fincastle County, Virginia during the American Revolutionary War and was now developing a neighboring Jefferson County property, brought his wife and family from Virginia. Two months later Alexander married their young daughter Priscilla, and thus also improved his political associations (her uncle was Patrick Henry). They built Oxmoor Farm, starting the main house in 1787, and growing tobacco, hemp, and corn. In 1789, Bullitt owned twenty-three enslaved people at Oxmoor. By 1795, that number had increased to seventy.

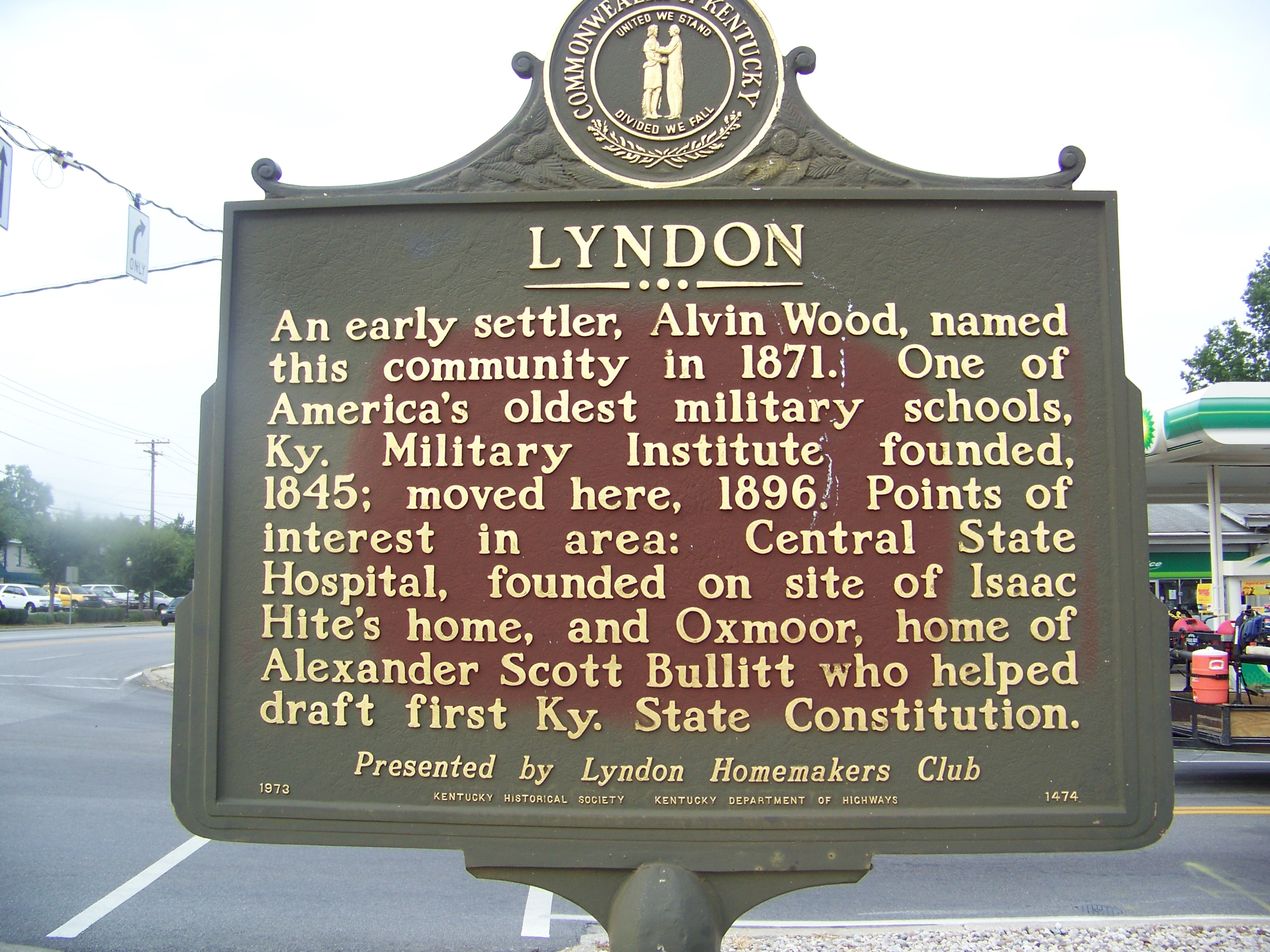
Lyndon historical marker

=== Political career ===
In 1784 Bullitt first became involved with Kentucky politics. He became an officer of the local militia, and was part of a convention at Danville that first proposed a separation from Virginia. After Colonel Christian died in a skirmish with Indians in 1786, Bullitt continued with the local militia and was promoted to the rank of major. He also became a trustee of the town of Louisville.

In 1792 when the idea of Kentucky statehood was accepted, Bullitt became a delegate to the convention (again in Danville) and was part of the committee that drafted the first state Constitution. With the new constitution effective, in June he was one of twelve men elected to the State Senate. He was elected its speaker, and served there until 1800.

When a second state constitution was sought, in 1799, Bullitt presided at the convention that wrote it. This new constitution created the office of Lieutenant Governor and he was elected to that office in 1800 serving under Governor James Garrard.

In 1804 or 1808 Bullitt returned to private life and full-time farming at Oxmoor.

== Personal life ==
He married Priscilla Christian (1785–1806), daughter of William Christian and his wife Annie Henry Christian (sister of Patrick Henry). Four of their children reached adulthood: William Christian, Anne, Helen Scott, and Cuthbert.

After his first wife died, Bullitt remarried, to widow Mary Churchill Prather. They had two children, Thomas James and Mary (Polly).

== Death and legacy ==
Bullitt died at Oxmoor in 1816 and is buried in the family graveyard. Bullitt County, Kentucky was named in his honor. Henry Clay's last court case concerned the will of Mary (Polly) Bullitt that her two brothers challenged.

Political offices
Preceded by (none)	Lieutenant Governor of Kentucky; 1800–1804	Succeeded by John Caldwell
