= James Steven Bullock =

American astrophysicist

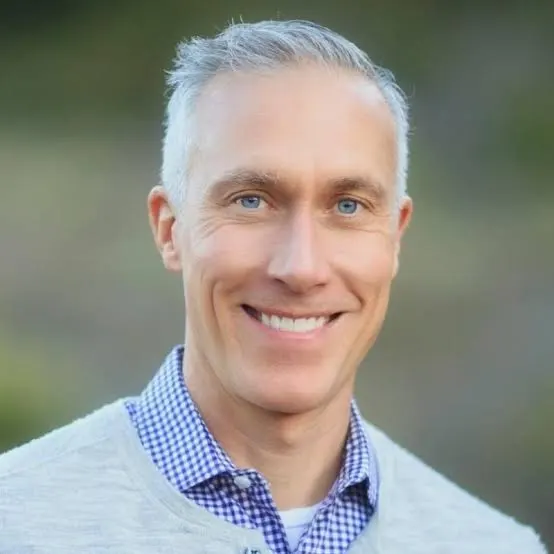
- Bullock's Portrait
- Education: Ohio State University (BS); University of California, Santa Cruz (PhD)
- Known for: Research on galaxy formation and dark matter
- Awards: Fellow of the American Association for the Advancement of Science (2008); Fellow of the American Physical Society (2023)
- Scientific career
- Fields: Astrophysics, Cosmology
- Workplaces: University of Southern California; University of California, Irvine
- Doctoral advisor: Joel Primack

James Steven Bullock is an American astrophysicist and academic administrator. He is the dean of the USC Dornsife College of Letters, Arts and Sciences and holds the Anna H. Bing Dean's Chair, as well as a professorship in the Department of Physics and Astronomy at the University of Southern California. Bullock's research focuses on the formation and evolution of galaxies, the nature of dark matter, and cosmology.

== Early life and education ==
Bullock grew up in Toledo, Ohio, where he developed an early interest in astronomy, inspired by Carl Sagan's Cosmos series.

He earned bachelor's degrees in physics and mathematics from Ohio State University in 1994, followed by a PhD in physics from the University of California, Santa Cruz in 1999, where he was a graduate student of Joel Primack.

== Career ==
After completing postdoctoral research at Ohio State University and a Hubble Fellowship at Harvard University from 2002 to 2004, Bullock joined the University of California, Irvine (UCI) as an assistant professor in 2004. He advanced to full professor and served as chair of the Department of Physics and Astronomy from 2017 to 2019, then as dean of the School of Physical Sciences from 2019 to 2025.

In 2025, Bullock was appointed dean of the USC Dornsife College of Letters, Arts and Sciences.

Bullock has held leadership roles in astronomical organizations, including chair of the James Webb Space Telescope Users Committee and the Space Telescope Science Institute Council.

== Research ==
Bullock's work integrates analytic models, supercomputer simulations, and observational data from telescopes like the Hubble Space Telescope and Keck Observatory to study galaxy formation, dark matter halos, and the evolution of structures like the Milky Way and the Local Group.

He has explored models of complex, self-interacting dark matter to address discrepancies in galaxy centers and small-scale challenges to the Lambda-CDM model.

His research has been cited over 60,000 times, with an h-index exceeding 110. His publications include studies on dark halo profiles and challenges to the Lambda-CDM model.

== Selected publications ==
- Bullock, James S.; Kolatt, Tsafrir S.; Sigad, Yair; Somerville, Rachel S.; Kravtsov, Andrey V.; Klypin, Anatoly A.; Primack, Joel R.; Dekel, Avishai (2001). "Profiles of dark haloes: evolution, scatter and environment". Monthly Notices of the Royal Astronomical Society. 321 (3): 559–575. arXiv:astro-ph/9908159. doi:10.1046/j.1365-8711.2001.04068.x.
- Bullock, James S.; Boylan-Kolchin, Michael (2017). "Small-Scale Challenges to the ΛCDM Paradigm". Annual Review of Astronomy and Astrophysics. 55 (1): 343–397. arXiv:1707.04256. doi:10.1146/annurev-astro-091916-055313.
- Hopkins, Philip F.; Kereš, Dušan; Oñorbe, Jose; Faucher-Giguère, Claude-André; Quataert, Eliot; Murray, Norman; Bullock, James S. (2014). "Galaxies on FIRE (Feedback In Realistic Environments): stellar feedback explains cosmologically inefficient star formation". Monthly Notices of the Royal Astronomical Society. 445 (1): 581–603. arXiv:1311.2073. doi:10.1093/mnras/stu1738.
- Boylan-Kolchin, Michael; Bullock, James S.; Kaplinghat, Manoj (2011). "Too big to fail? The puzzling darkness of massive Milky Way subhaloes". Monthly Notices of the Royal Astronomical Society: Letters. 415 (1): L40–L44. arXiv:1103.0007. doi:10.1111/j.1745-3933.2011.01074.x.

== Awards and honors ==
Bullock was elected a Fellow of the American Association for the Advancement of Science in 2008 and a Fellow of the American Physical Society in 2023, cited by the APS "for pioneering simulations of galactic dark matter halos that provided the theoretical scaffolding to connect observed galaxies to cosmological models through the key process of galaxy formation."

He has been recognized as a Clarivate Highly Cited Researcher in Space Science for seven consecutive years (2019–2025).

== Media appearances ==
Bullock has appeared in science documentaries including How the Universe Works and Through the Wormhole.
