= Bullet (nickname) =

Bullet is the nickname of:

- Bullet Rogan (1893–1967), baseball pitcher and outfielder in the American Negro leagues
- Bullet Joe Bush (1892–1974), baseball pitcher credited with inventing the forkball pitch
- Bullet Baker (1900–1961), professional football player
- Darren Ford (baseball) (born 1985), nicknamed The Bullet, baseball player
- Bob Hayes (1942–2002), known as Bullet Bob, American sprinter and National Football League wide receiver
- Bullet Prakash (born 1976), Indian actor
- Bullet Jalosjos (born 1979), Filipino businessman and politician
- Dan "Bullet" Riley, an alias of Dan Policowski, an early professional football player who caught the first recorded forward pass in 1906
- Bullet Joe Simpson (1893–1973), Canadian profession ice hockey defenceman
- Percy Langdon Wendell (1889-1932), American college football player and coach and college basketball coach
