= Baltimore Bullet =

Baltimore Bullet(s) may refer to:

== Sports ==
- Michael Phelps (born 1985), nicknamed Baltimore Bullet, American former swimmer
- Baltimore Bullets (1944–1954), an American Basketball League (ABL) franchise (1944–47) and National Basketball Association (NBA) franchise (1947–54)
- Baltimore Bullets (1963–1973), now Washington Wizards, a National Basketball Association franchise
- Baltimore Bullets (EPBL), an Eastern Professional Basketball League franchise (1958–61)

== Others ==
- The Baltimore Bullet, a 1980 film
