= William Fleming (governor) =

3rd governor of Virginia in 1781 (1727-1795)

3rd Governor of Virginia
- In office June 4, 1781 – June 12, 1781
- Preceded by: Thomas Jefferson
- Succeeded by: Thomas Nelson, Jr.

Member of the Virginia Senate from the Botetourt, Washington, Montgomery Counties and Kentucky district
- In office 1777–1779
- Preceded by: William Christian
- Succeeded by: William Christian

Personal details
- Born: February 18, 1727 Jedburgh, Scotland
- Died: August 5, 1795 (aged 68) Bedford, Hollins, Roanoke County, Virginia
- Spouse: Anne Christian (m.1763
- Children: 2
- Education: University of Edinburgh
- Profession: Physician, soldier, and planter

Colonel William Fleming (February 18, 1727 – August 5, 1795) was an American physician, soldier, politician, and planter who served as a local justice of the peace in the mountains of southwestern Virginia and Kentucky, as well as in the Senate of Virginia and briefly acted as the governor of Virginia during the American Revolutionary War.

Fleming is often confused with his contemporary, Judge William Fleming, who also served in the Virginia legislature (but from Cumberland County in the middle of the Commonwealth) and who was a delegate to the Continental Congress.

== Early and family life ==
This William Fleming was born in Jedburgh, Scotland in the Kingdom of Great Britain on February 7, 1727. His parents were Leonard and Dorthea Saterthwaite Fleming, who lived on Lake Windermere and registered four children in the Hugil Parish records and in Edinburgh. William Fleming studied in Dumfries with Mr. Trotter, then apprenticed with a surgeon for three years in Dumfries and Kirkcudbright, then worked with an apothecary in Kendall, where he survived the measles and reportedly avoided the revolt of Bonnie Prince Charlie, and the disastrous defeat at Culloden. In 1746, Fleming began formal study of medicine at the University of Edinburgh. He then entered the Royal Navy, supposedly serving as a surgeon's mate and surviving capture and imprisoned by the Spanish. After his release, Fleming resigned from the navy and emigrated to Virginia.

During leave in Staunton, Virginia in 1761, Fleming met Anne Christian (1744–1810), daughter of Col. Israel Christian (a wealthy landowner and the county's representative in the Virginia House of Burgesses) and his wife, Elizabeth Starke. They married in 1763 and soon agreed to care for George Helvick, a three-year-old orphan. Their first son would be named Leonard Israel Fleming to honor his grandfathers. Their longest surviving daughter, variously known as Annie or Nancy C. Fleming Baxter (1801–1870), would marry the president of Washington College and later Hampden-Sydney College, Rev. George A. Baxter (1772–1841).

== Career ==
During the French and Indian War, Fleming was commissioned an ensign in Williamsburg, Virginia. He initially became the surgeon for Captain McKenzie's company, then recruited for Captain Bell's company, and finally joined Captain Hog's company as its surgeon. Capt. Hog's company was assigned to protect Fort Dinwiddie near Warm Springs as part of George Washington's Virginia Regiment and was told to rendezvous with experienced scouts in Augusta Court House before heading further into the Appalachian Mountains. Fleming served as a surgeon under Major Andrew Lewis and experienced many attacks by the Shawnee, as well as severe clothing and food supply problems during what became known as the "Sandy Creek Expedition," because they reached the headwaters of the Clinch River and the streams that form the Big Sandy River. Weathering problems in accessing his promised bonus for serving as the unit's surgeon, Fleming received a promotion to Second Lieutenant the following spring, although Capt. Hog was demoted after complaints at Fort Vaux. By fall, surgeon Fleming was assigned to Lewis' headquarters at Fort Dickenson on the Cowpasture River near present Millboro, but his request to transfer to the regular army was ignored. In 1758, he accompanied Major Lewis and Virginia troops northward in what became known as the Forbes expedition, after General John Forbes, who assembled many colonial troops at Raystown, Pennsylvania north of Fort Cumberland and attacked the French at Fort Duquesne. Fleming continued participating in the Anglo-Cherokee War in 1759–1761.

=== Medicine and real estate ===
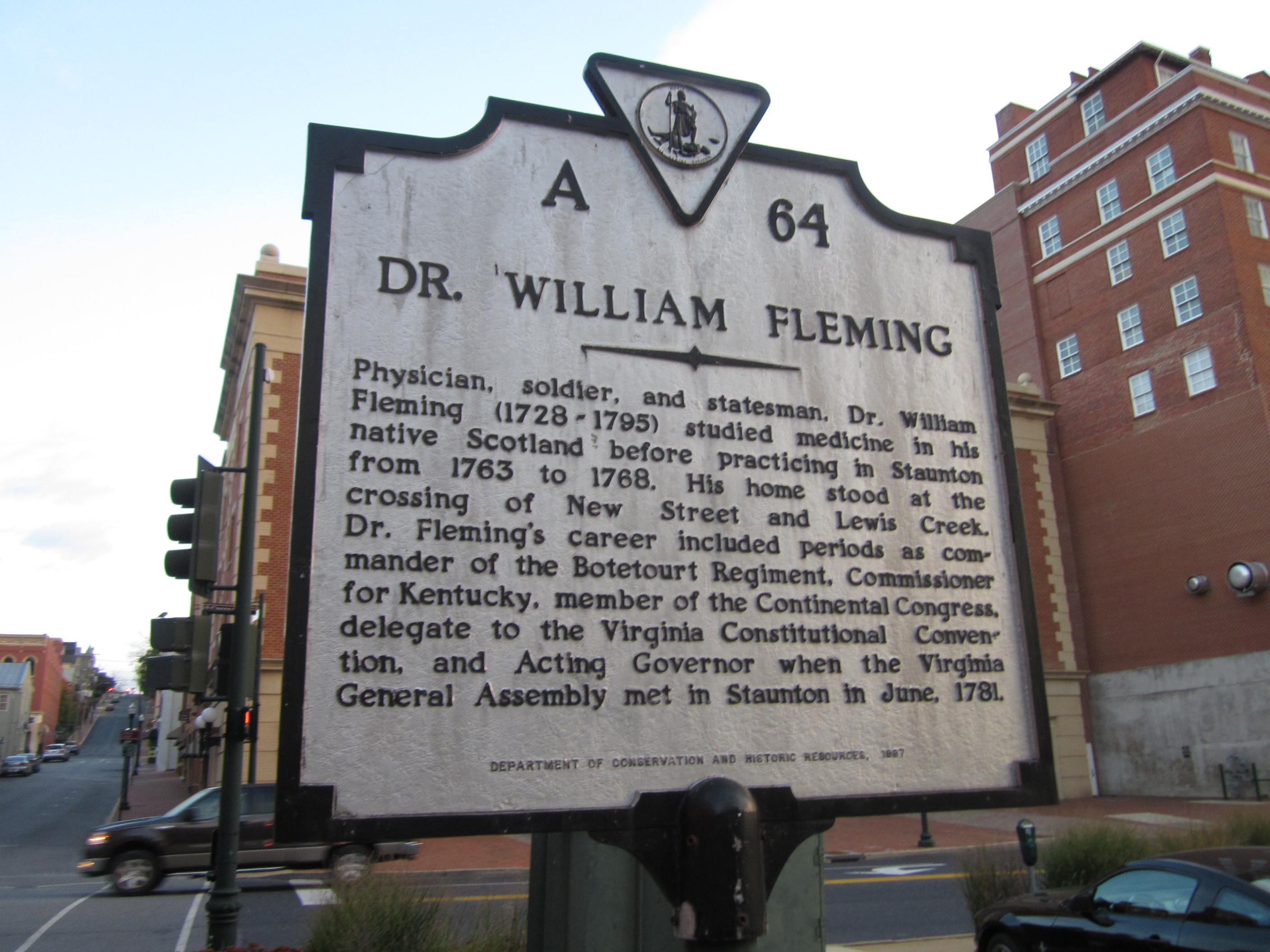
Historic marker in Staunton, Virginia.

When the war ended in 1763, Miller settled at Staunton, Virginia, and practiced medicine. Although a Presbyterian rather than a member of the Church of England, he was elected to the Augusta parish vestry in 1764, indicating his rising social status after his marriage, as well as his community involvement (the vestry was responsible for providing social services in the county). In May 1765, his social position had increased further, and he was elected to his first political office, as justice of the peace, on the same day as he increased his real estate holdings by purchasing 560 acres from William Beverley.

In 1768 Fleming retired from medicine in Augusta County and moved southward with other settlers and built "Belle Mount" or "Belmont" on land his father-in-law gave him in the Roanoke Valley. These gifts, his medical practice, and his further investments in land individually and through the Loyal Company of Virginia eventually made Fleming wealthy. In 1769 he acquired his first indentured servant, and the following year Botetourt County was split from what had been the vast Augusta County. Fleming became a justice of the peace in the new county and later justice of the county court, which eventually ordered the establishment of a Court House. Soon, the Virginia General Assembly authorized a subdivision around the courthouse which became the Town of Fincastle and the county seat.

== Militia service ==
In Dunmore's War (1774), Colonel Fleming led the Botetourt County militia along with other troops under the guidance of the experienced Col. Andrew Lewis at the Battle of Point Pleasant. Fleming continued to lead his men after being shot twice. However, a third, more severe wound forced his withdrawal. The musket ball lodged in his chest was never removed and often caused him pain. The Virginia General Assembly awarded him £500 in compensation. He never fully recovered, so that lingering wound prevented his military service in the American Revolutionary War.

== Political career ==
A patriot nonetheless, Fleming remained active in politics during the American Revolution, representing a western district as a member of the Senate of Virginia. He succeeded his brother-in-law William Christian and, in turn, was succeeded by him in 1779 so Fleming could address matters in the mountains. However, Fleming continued his political involvement as a member of the Governor's Council.

In January 1781, British forces invaded Virginia and scattered the remaining Virginia legislators from Richmond, as well as forced governor Thomas Jefferson to flee into the mountains. When the legislature reconvened at Staunton, Jefferson's term had expired, so Fleming, as the senior member of the Virginia Council present, acted unofficially as governor. He served in this capacity from June 4 to 12, when the reconvened legislature elected Thomas Nelson as the next governor. During this brief time, Fleming called out the Virginia militia to oppose the British invasion by Benedict Arnold, Banastre Tarleton, and others. The legislature retroactively legalized his actions. For this reason, Fleming is listed as the third governor of the commonwealth.

During and after the War for Independence, Fleming headed commissions to Kentucky to settle land disputes and attend to other official business, including auditing the accounts of various officials in the new state's western region as the war ended. In 1780, the General Assembly formally abolished Kentucky County (which he represented alongside neighboring counties) and established Fayette, Jefferson, and Lincoln Counties. In 1784 Fleming attended one of the conventions held in Danville, Virginia, which paved the way for Kentucky's separation from Virginia. His final public service was as one of Botetourt County's two delegates to the 1788 Virginia Ratifying Convention (alongside Martin McFerran); an event held at the Richmond Theatre. Although Fleming had reservations about the new U.S. Constitution, he voted in favor of ratification as his constituents had instructed. He also served on the board of trustees of Washington College (later Washington and Lee University) and was known for having one of the finest libraries in the western part of the Commonwealth.

== Death and legacy ==
Fleming's health visibly declined by 1792, and he could not visit his Warfield grandchildren in Kentucky. However, he still managed to visit New London in September, as well as arrange for the marriage of his daughter Eliza to Cary Allen in 1794. Col. William Fleming died at his home on August 5, 1795. He was buried in the family graveyard in what decades later became Hollins, Virginia. His widow was buried beside him in 1810 and became the namesake of the Nancy Christian Fleming Chapter of the Daughters of the American Revolution. Their daughter Annie would marry a prominent Presbyterian clergyman, Rev. George Baxter, who presided over Washington College (under the supervision of this Fleming and other trustees), although only his widow ultimately survived the American Civil War in Lexington, Virginia, not very far from where her parents had courted. Their son Sidney Smith Baxter would become the attorney general of Virginia. Leonard Israel Fleming would marry Nancy Marshal Bacey and live in Kentucky. The Library of Virginia has this William Fleming's papers as governor and executive officer, as well as those of the judge William Fleming with whom he is often confused.

William Fleming High School in Roanoke, Virginia, is named for him. Their mascot is "The Colonel." The first planned community in Roanoke was named "Belmont" to honor his former plantation, albeit indirectly through the Belmont Land Company (1888), and is now being considered for nomination as a historic district.

== See also ==
- List of United States governors born outside the United States

Political offices
Preceded by Thomas Jefferson	Governor of Virginia; 1781	Succeeded by Thomas Nelson, Jr.
