= Thomas Bullitt =

American military officer and pioneer (1730–1778)

- Born: c. 1730; Fauquier County, Virginia
- Died: February 1778 (aged 47–48); Fauquier County, Virginia
- Relatives: Cuthbert Bullitt (brother)
- Military career
- Allegiance: British America; United States
- Branch: Continental Army; United States Army; Virginia Militia
- Service years: 1754–1778
- Rank: Adjutant general; Colonel
- Conflicts: American Revolutionary War; Battle of Great Bridge; Defense of Norfolk

Thomas Bullitt (1730 – February 1778) was a United States military officer, and surveyor from Prince William County, Virginia and frontiersman.

== Early and family life ==
Thomas was born to Benjamin and Sarah (Harrison) Bullitt in 1730 in Prince William County, then in the Province of Virginia. Active in the local militia as a youth, he became interested in western exploration and development. By 1754 he was a captain of the county's militia, and participated in a number of attempts to secure western Virginia and Pennsylvania from the French. His younger brother Cuthbert Bullitt studied to become an attorney, became a planter in Prince William County and represented it in the Virginia House of Delegates, mostly after this man's death.

== French and Indian War ==
Thomas Bullitt served as a cadet in Lt. Colonel Washington's expedition in 1754 that ended with defeat at the Battle of Great Meadows. The next year Captain Bullitt and his men again marched against Fort Duquesne, this time with the Braddock Expedition, and again failed, at the Battle of Monogahela on July 9, 1755.

The third try in 1758 also started badly, but ended victoriously. Bullitt commanded a militia company in the Forbes Expedition. In September he was part of the large advance party of regulars and militia commanded by Major James Grant. After Grant refused advice on wilderness fighting, his party was ambushed by the French and their Indian allies on September 21, 1758. They suffered great losses and Grant was captured. Bullitt took to the woods, but rallied the militia, and counterattacked their pursuers. He then commanded more than half of the original party back to their main force. The French were forced to abandon the fort during November.

On May 22, 1759, French and Indian troops defeated a party of 100 Virginians commanded by Captain Thomas Bullitt on the Forbes Road near Fort Ligonier. Bullitt and his troops were taking provisions from Bedford to Fort Ligonier when they were attacked. They suffered more than 40 casualties and lost many of their supplies. William Byrd published in Hunter's Virginia Gazette (Williamsburg) a letter dated 26 Oct 1759 and sent from Pittsburgh in which he stated that Gen. John Stanwix at Byrd's request convened a court of inquiry to investigate Captain Bullitt's conduct. The court decided unanimously 'that Captain Bullitt behaved like a good Officer, and did every Thing in his Power to repulse the Enemy, and save the Convoy.'"

== After the war ==
Bullitt kept his interest in the frontier. He began to speculate in land and invest in development. When a number of his militia company exercised their land grant bounties in what would become Bath County, Virginia, he bought land there and built an Inn at Hot Springs in 1766. During the next few years his guests included Thomas Jefferson and George Washington.

During the war, Andrew Lewis and Thomas Bullitt had surveyed part of the area and had heard stories from the Native Americans and colonists about the healing powers of the springs. In 1764, Captain Thomas Bullitt received a colonial land grant of 300 acres which contained seven hot and warm springs. "After receiving the award, Captain Bullitt moved his militia company and their families to the area. The land was cleared, and within two years, a wooden 18 room wooden hotel was constructed there, and in 1766 the "Homestead" was opened and named in honor of the homesteaders who built the resort and bathhouses." The Omni Homestead Resort, as it is termed today, continued to be operated by Thomas Bullitt's family after his death during the Revolution, until 1832, when it was sold to Dr. Thomas Goode (physician), who also purchased the Healing Springs, Virginia and the resort at Warm Springs, Virginia.

=== Surveying Kentucky ===
On December 3, 1772, Captain Bullitt advertised in Virginia Gazette that he had the intention to lead a surveying party into the Kanawha, Ohio River and Kentucky region for the purpose of identifying claims for veterans in the French and Indian War, which were promised to them by Lt. Gov. Dinwiddie as payment for their services. Bullitt himself, a recently licensed surveyor, received permission from Lord Dunmore, John Murray, to lead the party was also authorized a substantial tract (1,240 acres due to his rank as a Captain). Primarily, his role was to survey 10,000 acres for George Washington.

In April 1773, Bullitt gathered about 40 men which included Joshua Morris, and Hancock Taylor which set out from the New River Settlements to the Kanawha and generally followed the along the south side of the Valley of the Ohio. He made some excursions from his direct path, going as far north as Chillicothe to speak with Chief Cornstalk of the Shawnee. By July his party had reached the Falls of the Ohio, and Bullitt laid out a town site there that later became Louisville, Kentucky.

Bullitt and his men tried to maintain peaceful relations with the Indians, but did lose one work surveyor in an attack. The incursion was also one of the complaints that caused Lord Dunmore's War the next year.

During the expedition, another smaller survey was being conducted a month earlier by a group of rangers and Walter Kelly, who departed in February 1773 and had already Tomahawked and begun improvements on many sought after lands. Leading to an attempt by George Washington to obtain full rights to the "Burning Springs," which was discovered by Peter and John Van Bibber.

== The Revolutionary War ==
Bullitt still had the post of Adjutant General for the Virginia militia. As the American Revolutionary War became imminent he sympathized with the rebel cause. When Governor Dunmore made his last stand in 1775, Captain Bullitt was a part of the forces that assembled for the Battle of Great Bridge, alongside fellow surveyor Ensign Joshua Morris. He commanded engineering works for Colonel William Woodford who had overall command. His rapidly constructed defenses aided in the overwhelming American victory on December 9, 1775. Dunmore fell back to Norfolk, but was forced to abandon that as well when Bullitt began the construction of siege trenches and works. By the end of December, Virginia had no British forces on her land, and Bullitt was promoted to Colonel.

In August 1775, Bullitt was elected as Adjutant General of the Virginia Militia.

Thomas Bullitt was elected in military positions by the House of Delegates (legislature), he never was successful at securing a position and never once held a seat. He made an exception in November and December 1777 to help George Rogers Clark promote his plans for a western campaign. The delegates made Clark a Lieutenant Colonel and authorized him to defend the western frontiers. A second, and secret, set of orders allowed him to invade the Illinois Country. These were known only to Bullitt, Patrick Henry, Thomas Jefferson, George Mason and George Wythe.

== Death and will ==
Bullitt died at his home in Fauquier County, Virginia, in February, 1778, at the comparatively early age of forty-eight years. His will, dated September 17, 1775, was probated February 23, 1778 (Will Book I, p. 321, Fauquier County). By his will, he left 400 acres and an annual allowance for support to his illegitimate daughter, Sarah Elizabeth Brounaunt, or Bronaugh, and most of the balance of his estate to his brother, Judge Cuthbert Bullitt.
