= National Register of Historic Places listings in Smyth County, Virginia =

Location of Smyth County in Virginia

This is a list of the National Register of Historic Places listings in Smyth County, Virginia.

This is intended to be a complete list of the properties and districts on the National Register of Historic Places in Smyth County, Virginia, United States. The locations of National Register properties and districts for which the latitude and longitude coordinates are included below, may be seen in an online map.

There are 24 properties and districts listed on the National Register in the county.

This National Park Service list is complete through NPS recent listings posted February 6, 2026.

== Current listings ==
	Name on the Register	Image	Date listed	Location	City or town	Description
1	Aspenvale Cemetery	Aspenvale Cemetery	December 5, 1980 (#80004226)	Off U.S. Route 11; 36°48′53″N 81°38′25″W	Seven Mile Ford	
2	A.C. Beatie House	A.C. Beatie House	July 5, 2001 (#01000697)	249 W. U.S. Route 11; 36°47′55″N 81°41′04″W	Chilhowie	
3	H.L. Bonham House	H.L. Bonham House	May 11, 2000 (#00000485)	408 White Top Rd. 36°47′43″N 81°40′53″W	Chilhowie	
4	Chilhowie Methodist Episcopal Church	Chilhowie Methodist Episcopal Church	July 3, 1991 (#91000830)	501 Old Stage Rd. 36°48′09″N 81°40′55″W	Chilhowie	
5	Downtown Chilhowie Historic District	Downtown Chilhowie Historic District	February 4, 2000 (#00000065)	Main St., S. Whitetop Rd., and U.S. Route 11; 36°47′54″N 81°40′53″W	Chilhowie	
6	Fox Farm Site	Fox Farm Site	June 23, 1978 (#78003045)	Holston River, across from the end of Wassum Valley; 36°50′01″N 81°35′46″W	McMullin	
7	R. T. Greer and Company	R. T. Greer and Company	May 23, 1997 (#97000481)	107 Pendleton St. 36°50′02″N 81°30′57″W	Marion	
8	Henderson Building, Southwestern State Hospital	Henderson Building, Southwestern State Hospital	December 21, 1990 (#89001919)	E. Main St. 36°50′00″N 81°30′43″W	Marion	Now part of Southwestern Virginia Mental Health Institute
9	Hotel Lincoln	Hotel Lincoln	July 21, 1995 (#95000897)	107 E. Main St. 36°50′00″N 81°31′10″W	Marion	
10	Hungry Mother State Park Historic District	Hungry Mother State Park Historic District	April 12, 2007 (#07000303)	2854 State Route 16; 36°53′04″N 81°31′31″W	Marion	
11	Konnarock Training School	Konnarock Training School	June 5, 1997 (#97000483)	Junction of Whitetop and Konnarock Rds. 36°40′19″N 81°36′42″W	Konnarock	
12	Lincoln Theatre	Lincoln Theatre	December 17, 1992 (#92001710)	117 E. Main St. 36°50′01″N 81°31′09″W	Marion	
13	Marion Historic District	Marion Historic District	August 2, 2000 (#00000888)	Roughly along Main, Cherry, Strother, Lee, N. College, and College Sts.; also W. Cherry, E. Main, N. Main, Maple, N. Chestnut, Broad, and N. Commerce Sts. 36°49′59″N 81°31′13″W	Marion	Second set of boundaries represents a boundary increase of July 28, 2011
14	Marion Male Academy	Marion Male Academy	November 2, 1989 (#89001915)	343 College St. 36°49′53″N 81°31′34″W	Marion	
15	Norfolk & Western Railway Depot	Norfolk & Western Railway Depot	February 8, 1995 (#95000025)	651 N. Main St. 36°50′22″N 81°30′42″W	Marion	
16	Old Stone Tavern	Old Stone Tavern	July 8, 1982 (#82004595)	U.S. Route 11; 36°51′52″N 81°26′12″W	Atkins	
17	Preston House	Preston House	November 25, 1969 (#69000280)	West of the junction of U.S. Route 11 and Chestnut Ridge Rd. 36°48′23″N 81°37′13″W	Marion	
18	Preston House	Preston House	July 30, 1976 (#76002120)	Madison St. 36°52′16″N 81°45′41″W	Saltville	
19	Saltville Battlefields Historic District	Saltville Battlefields Historic District	March 25, 2010 (#10000096)	State Routes 91 and 107, and Cedar Branch Rd. 36°53′20″N 81°44′44″W	Saltville	Extends into Washington County
20	Saltville Historic District	Saltville Historic District	April 12, 2002 (#02000367)	Main St., 1st Ave., Palmer Ave, Palmer Ln., Stadium Dr., and Henrytown Rd. 36°52′46″N 81°45′57″W	Saltville	
21	Scott-Walker House	Scott-Walker House	May 19, 1994 (#94000450)	Eastern side of Buckeye Hollow Rd., 2 miles (3.2 km) southeast of Saltville; 36°53′01″N 81°43′22″W	Saltville	
22	Smyth County Community Hospital	Smyth County Community Hospital	December 15, 2015 (#15000908)	565 Radio Hill Rd. 36°51′05″N 81°30′28″W	Marion	
23	Southwestern State Hospital Tubercular Building		August 17, 2023 (#100009245)	281 Bagley Cir. 36°50′03″N 81°30′36″W	Marion	
24	Abijah Thomas House	Abijah Thomas House	November 28, 1980 (#80004225)	Southwest of Marion on Thomas Bridge Rd. 36°46′28″N 81°34′12″W	Marion	

== See also ==
- List of National Historic Landmarks in Virginia
- National Register of Historic Places listings in Virginia
