= Fox Farm site =

Fox Farm site may refer to:

- Fox Farm site (Mays Lick, Kentucky) near Mays Lick, Kentucky, NRHP-listed
- Fox Farm site (McMullin, Virginia), listed on the NRHP in Smyth County, Virginia
