= Smyth County Community Hospital =

Geography
- Location: Smyth County, Virginia, United States

Links
- Lists: Hospitals in Virginia

- Smyth County Community Hospital
- U.S. National Register of Historic Places
- Virginia Landmarks Register
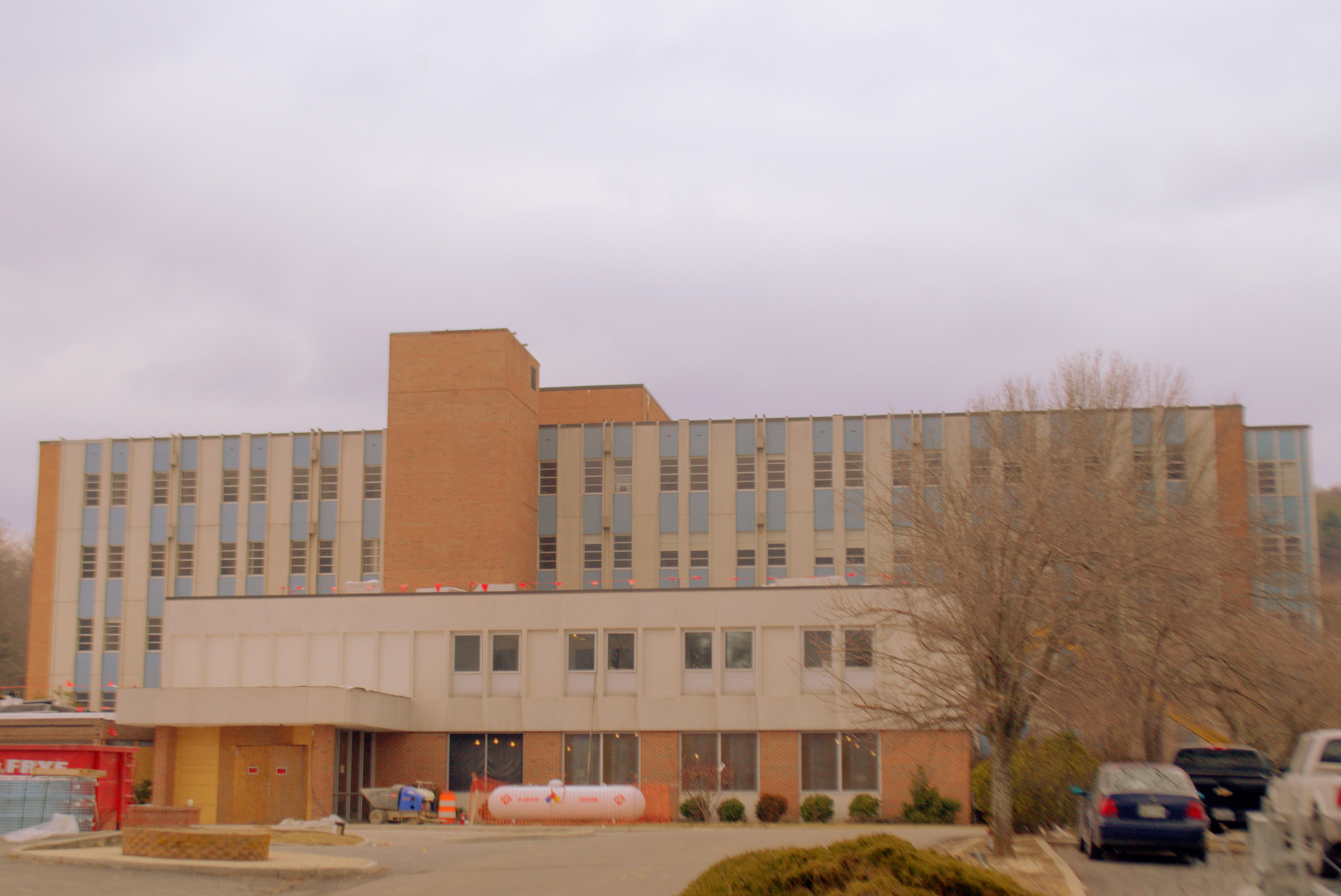

- Location within Virginia Location within the United States
- Location: 565 Radio Hill Rd., Marion, Virginia
- Coordinates: 36°51′14″N 81°30′28″W
- Area: less than one acre
- Built: 1965
- Architect: Echols-Sparger & Associates
- Architectural style: International
- NRHP reference No.: 15000908
- VLR No.: 119-5017

Significant dates
- Added to NRHP: December 15, 2015
- Designated VLR: September 17, 2015

The Smyth County Community Hospital is a historic hospital building at 565 Radio Hill Road in Marion, Smyth County, Virginia. It is a four-story steel-framed structure, finished in brick veneer, with a prominent five-story brick tower projecting at its center. One and two-story additions have been added to various parts of the building. It was built in 1965–67 to a design by Echols-Sparger & Associates, a local architectural firm, and was the first fully racially integrated hospital in southwestern Virginia.

The building was listed on the National Register of Historic Places in 2015.

== See also ==
- National Register of Historic Places listings in Smyth County, Virginia
