= R. T. Greer and Company =

R. T. Greer and Company may refer to:

- R. T. Greer and Company (Pikeville, Kentucky), listed on the National Register of Historic Places in Pike County, Kentucky
- R. T. Greer and Company Root and Herb Warehouse, Todd, North Carolina, listed on the National Register of Historic Places in Ashe County, North Carolina
- R. T. Greer and Company (Marion, Virginia), listed on the National Register of Historic Places in Smyth County, Virginia
