= Ernie Lindsey =

American novelist

Ernie Lindsey is an American novelist whose novel Sara's Game (2012) became a USA Today and Amazon Kindle bestseller. He also writes paranormal suspense novels under the pen name Desmond Doane.

== Biography ==
Lindsey grew up in Marion, Virginia as an avid reader. After struggling in his intended oceanography major at Old Dominion University, he began studying creative writing with author Sheri Reynolds. In 2009, he moved to Oregon, where he married his wife Sarah and had a son.

== Fiction ==
Lindsey is the author of numerous novels and novellas. His first novels, Going Shogun and The Two Crosses, were published independently in 2012. Going Shogun is a dystopian comedy in which two waiters attempt to raise their tightly controlled social standing by stealing and publishing their employer's secret recipes. Erik Wecks of Wired called it a "hilarious romp through a comic and dangerous underground subculture of hackers, drug users, and wannabes" and "a perfect summer read", while noting that it "needs a copy edit and displays many of the traits which will irritate those who appreciate the value of a traditional editorial team." Wired subsequently named it one of the "Best Books of 2012".

Later in 2012, Lindsey began considering a new direction for his work, frustrated by the slow sales of his previous novels. Observing the success of the Hunger Games franchise, he jokingly told his wife that he should write a novel with "game" in the title; this became the genesis of his novel Sara's Game, the story of a woman whose husband and child disappear at the hands of a mysterious, taunting nemesis. Sara's Game became his most successful novel to date, appearing on the USA Today bestseller list and reaching #2 on the Amazon Kindle chart. In February 2013, the novel was offered as the Amazon "Daily Deal".

Lindsey's subsequent novels include three more in the "Sara" series and the "Warchild" trilogy, a series of dystopian thrillers about a teenage girl who must help her outpost to survive a war after total societal collapse. Lindsey says that the most important influence on his work is thriller author Dean Koontz.
