= Marion Historic District (Marion, Virginia) =

Historic district in Virginia, United States

- U.S. National Register of Historic Places
- U.S. Historic district
- Virginia Landmarks Register
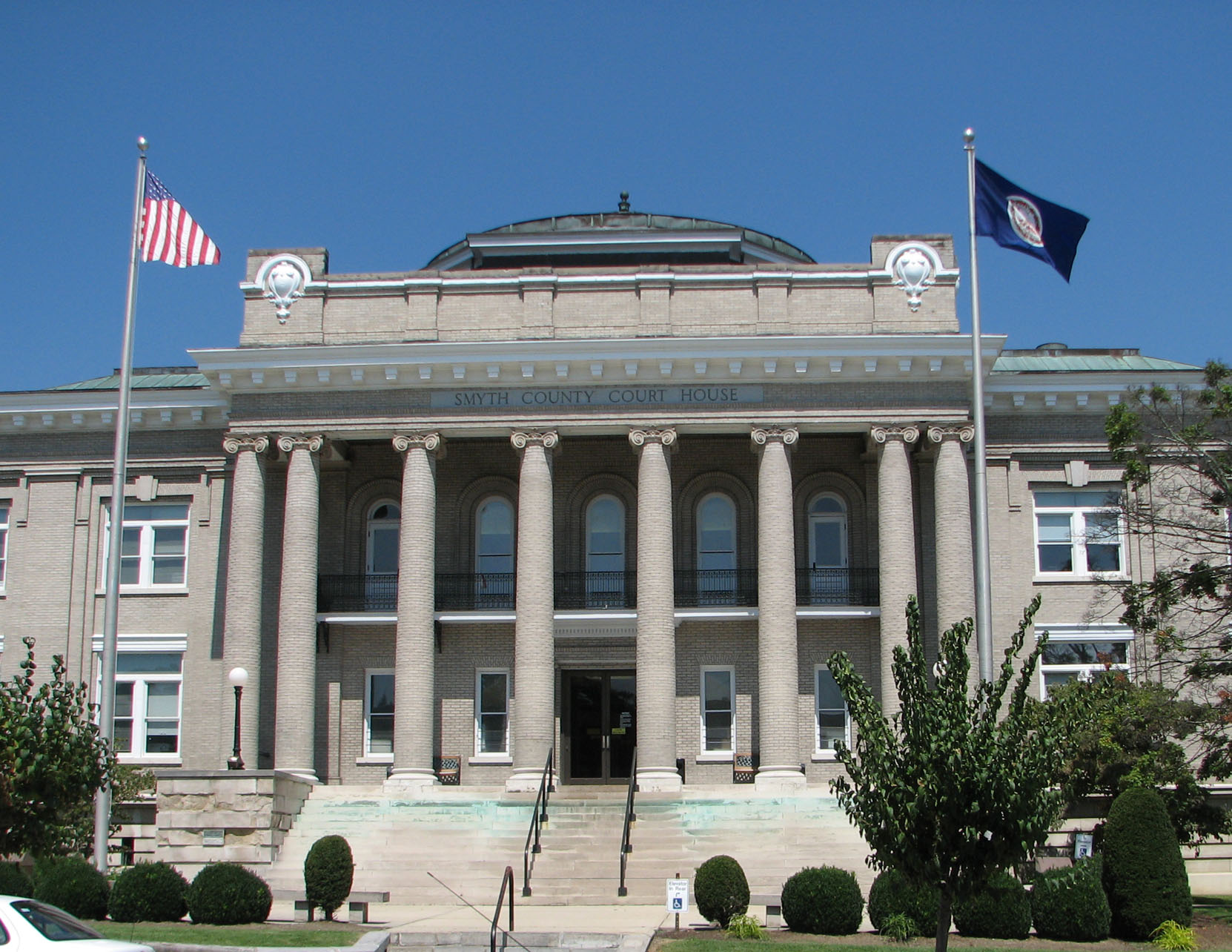
- Smyth County Courthouse, August 2006

- Location within Virginia Location within the United States
- Location: Roughly along Main, Cherry, Strother, Lee, North College and College Sts.; W. Cherry, E. Main, N. Main, Maple, N. Chestnut, Broad & N. Commerce Sts., Marion, Virginia
- Coordinates: 36°49′54″N 81°31′21″W
- Area: 130 acres (53 ha)
- Architectural style: Beaux Arts, Queen Anne, et al.
- NRHP reference No.: 00000888
- VLR No.: 119-0012

Significant dates
- Added to NRHP: August 2, 2000, July 28, 2011 (Boundary Increase)
- Designated VLR: June 14, 2000, December 18, 2008

Marion Historic District is a national historic district located at Marion, Smyth County, Virginia. The district includes 361 contributing buildings, 2 contributing sites, and 1 contributing object in the central business district and surrounding residential areas of Marion. It includes a variety of residential, commercial, institutional, industrial, and governmental buildings primarily dating from the mid-19th to mid-20th centuries. Notable buildings include the Sheffey Loom House (c. 1855), Odd Fellows Lodge (c. 1860), Look & Lincoln Wagon Factory warehouse (c. 1880), the Beaux-Arts style Marion County Courthouse (1905), Mt. Pleasant Methodist Church, Courtview Building (1890s), Marion High School (1907-1908), Marion Junior College (1912), the Overall Factory (c. 1920), Weiler Building (c. 1930), Bank of Marion (1922), Royal Oak Presbyterian Church (1923), Marion Municipal Building (1935), Marion Post Office (1936), and a Lustron house (1948). Also located in the district are the separately listed Hotel Lincoln, Lincoln Theatre, Marion Male Academy, and Norfolk & Western Railway Depot.

It was listed on the National Register of Historic Places in 2000, with a boundary increase in 2011.
