= H.L. Bonham House =

Historic house in Virginia, United States

- U.S. National Register of Historic Places
- Virginia Landmarks Register
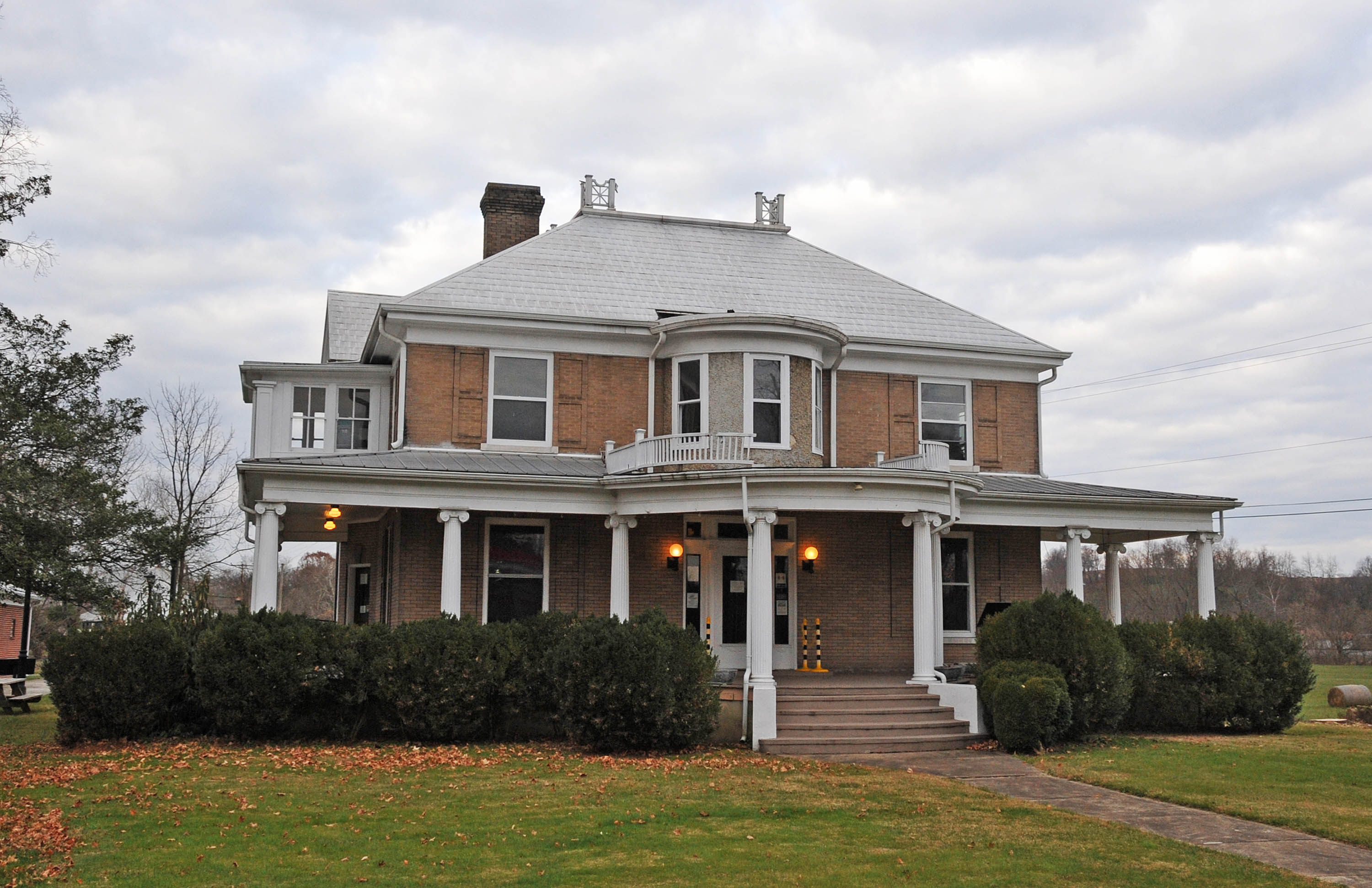
- H. L. Bonham House in 2014

- Location within Virginia Location within the United States
- Location: 408 White Top Road, near Chilhowie, Virginia
- Coordinates: 36°47′43″N 81°40′54″W
- Area: 4 acres (1.6 ha)
- Built: 1911
- Architect: Kearfoot, C.B., Jr.
- Architectural style: Colonial Revival
- NRHP reference No.: 00000485
- VLR No.: 189-0003

Significant dates
- Added to NRHP: May 11, 2000
- Designated VLR: March 15, 2000

H. L. Bonham House is a historic house located at 408 White Top Road near Chilhowie, Smyth County, Virginia.

== Description and history ==
It was built in 1911 and was designed by C. B. Kearfoot Jr. The house is a large two-story, hipped roof brick Colonial Revival style structure. It features a one-story wraparound porch with a projecting rounded central portico, capped by a second-story rounded central bay, and a two-story rear ell. Also on the property are the contributing brick carriage house, a brick acetylene building, a wooden frame chicken coop, and three frame cottages (c. 1910).

It was listed on the National Register of Historic Places on May 11, 2000.
