= A.C. Beatie House =

Historic house in Virginia, United States

- U.S. National Register of Historic Places
- Virginia Landmarks Register
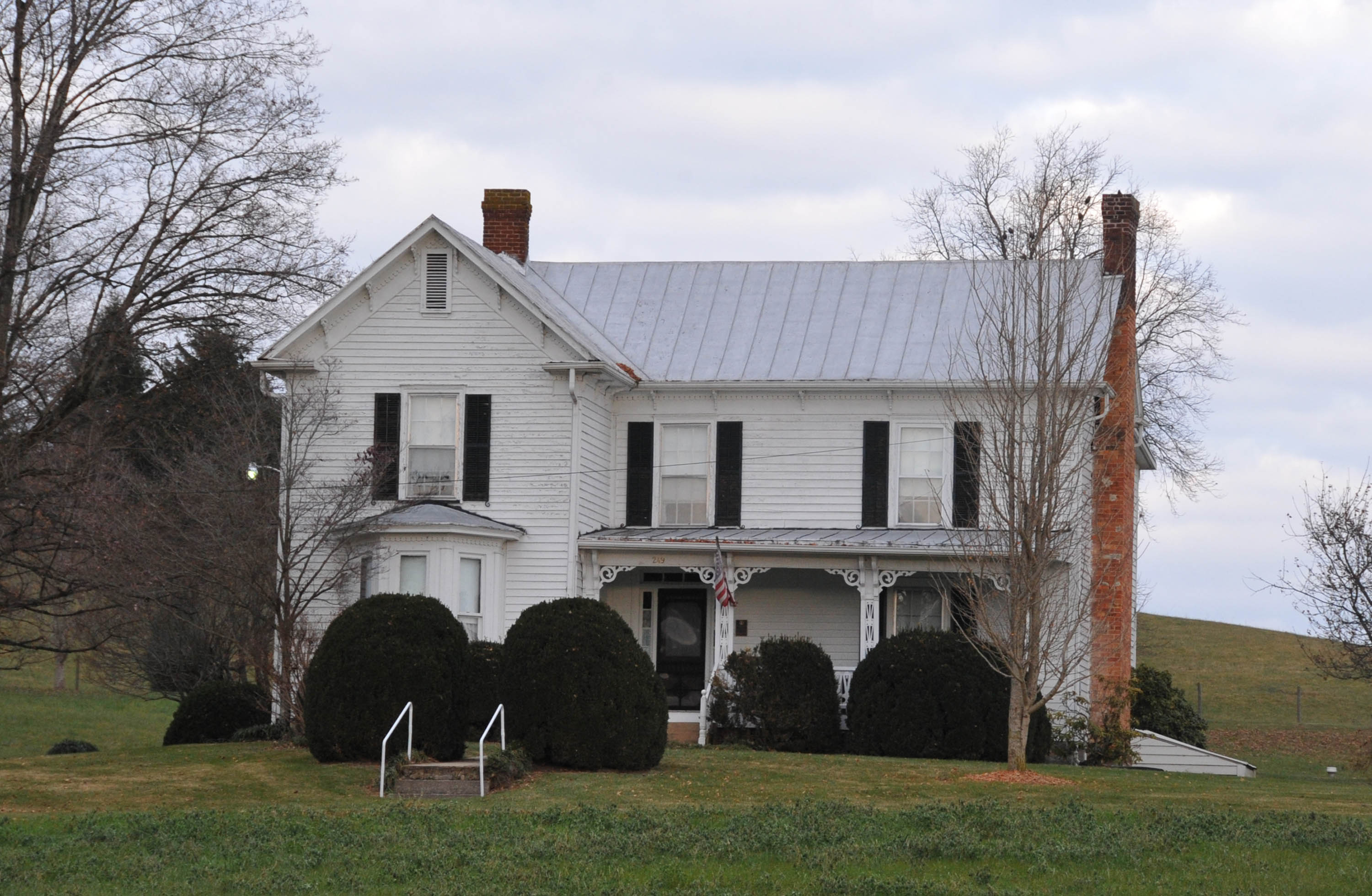

- Location within Virginia Location within the United States
- Location: 249 W. Lee Hwy., near Chilhowie, Virginia
- Coordinates: 36°47′55″N 81°41′4″W
- Area: 18 acres (7.3 ha)
- Built: 1891
- Built by: Pendleton, J. William
- Architectural style: Queen Anne
- NRHP reference No.: 01000697
- VLR No.: 189-0014

Significant dates
- Added to NRHP: July 5, 2001
- Designated VLR: July 5, 2001

A.C. Beatie House is a historic home located near Chilhowie, Smyth County, Virginia. It was built in 1891, and is a two-story, frame Queen Anne style dwelling. It features a cornice with molded gable returns and scroll-sawn profile brackets, a polygonal front bay, and a one-story, three-bay porch with intricately scroll-sawn columns, cornice brackets, and balustrade. Also on the property are the contributing poured concrete dairy, a frame smokehouse constructed above an underground root cellar, a frame shed used to store coal and wood, a shed-roofed chicken coop, a frame garden house / garage, a garage, and a frame machinery shed. Also located on the property are the ruins of Town House, composed of three stone chimneys and brick wall remnants of a summer kitchen.

It was listed on the National Register of Historic Places in 2001.
