= Atkins, Virginia =

- CDP
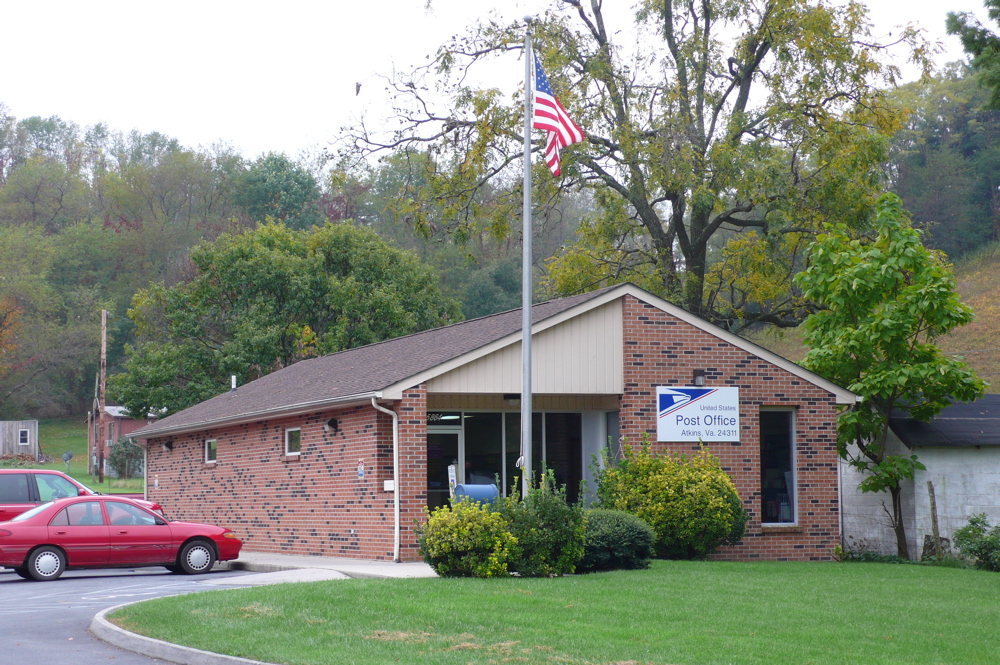
- The Post Office in Atkins, Virginia

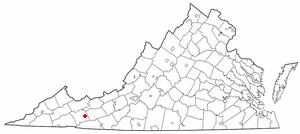
- Location of Atkins, Virginia
- Coordinates: 36°52′8″N 81°24′36″W
- Country: United States
- State: Virginia
- County: Smyth

Area
  - Total: 5.4 sq mi (14.0 km^{2})
  - Land: 5.4 sq mi (14.0 km^{2})
  - Water: 0 sq mi (0.0 km^{2})
- Elevation: 2,300 ft (700 m)

Population (2000)
  - Total: 1,138
  - Density: 211/sq mi (81.3/km^{2})
- Time zone: UTC−5 (Eastern (EST))
  - Summer (DST): UTC−4 (EDT)
- ZIP code: 24311
- Area code: 276
- FIPS code: 51-03512
- GNIS feature ID: 1481353

Atkins is a census-designated place (CDP) in Smyth County, Virginia, United States. As of the 2020 census, Atkins had a population of 1,121.

== History ==
The Old Stone Tavern was listed on the National Register of Historic Places in 1982.

== Geography ==
Atkins is located at 36°52′8″N 81°24′36″W (36.868967, −81.410030).

According to the United States Census Bureau, the CDP has a total area of 5.4 square miles (14.0 km^{2}), all land.

== Demographics ==
Historical population
Census	Pop.	Note	%±
1980	1,352		—
1990	1,130		−16.4%
2000	1,138		0.7%
U.S. Decennial Census; 1950 1960 1970; 1980 1990 2000; 2010

Adwolf first appeared as a census designated place in the 1980 U.S. census.

As of the census of 2000, there were 1,138 people, 494 households, and 329 families residing in the CDP. The population density was 210.6 people per square mile (81.4/km^{2}). There were 571 housing units at an average density of 105.7/sq mi (40.8/km^{2}). The racial makeup of the CDP was 98.95% White, 0.09% Native American, 0.53% from other races, and 0.44% from two or more races. Hispanic or Latino of any race were 0.88% of the population.

There were 494 households, out of which 26.9% had children under the age of 18 living with them, 50.0% were married couples living together, 11.5% had a female householder with no husband present, and 33.2% were non-families. 29.1% of all households were made up of individuals, and 11.9% had someone living alone who was 65 years of age or older. The average household size was 2.30 and the average family size was 2.81.

In the CDP, the population was spread out, with 21.6% under the age of 18, 9.1% from 18 to 24, 28.4% from 25 to 44, 26.4% from 45 to 64, and 14.6% who were 65 years of age or older. The median age was 38 years. For every 100 females, there were 90.3 males. For every 100 females age 18 and over, there were 86.6 males.

The median income for a household in the CDP was $26,667, and the median income for a family was $30,625. Males had a median income of $23,274 versus $17,000 for females. The per capita income for the CDP was $17,516. About 5.6% of families and 9.6% of the population were below the poverty line, including 7.6% of those under age 18 and 6.5% of those age 65 or over.
