= Hotel Lincoln (Marion, Virginia) =

- U.S. National Register of Historic Places
- U.S. Historic district – Contributing property
- Virginia Landmarks Register
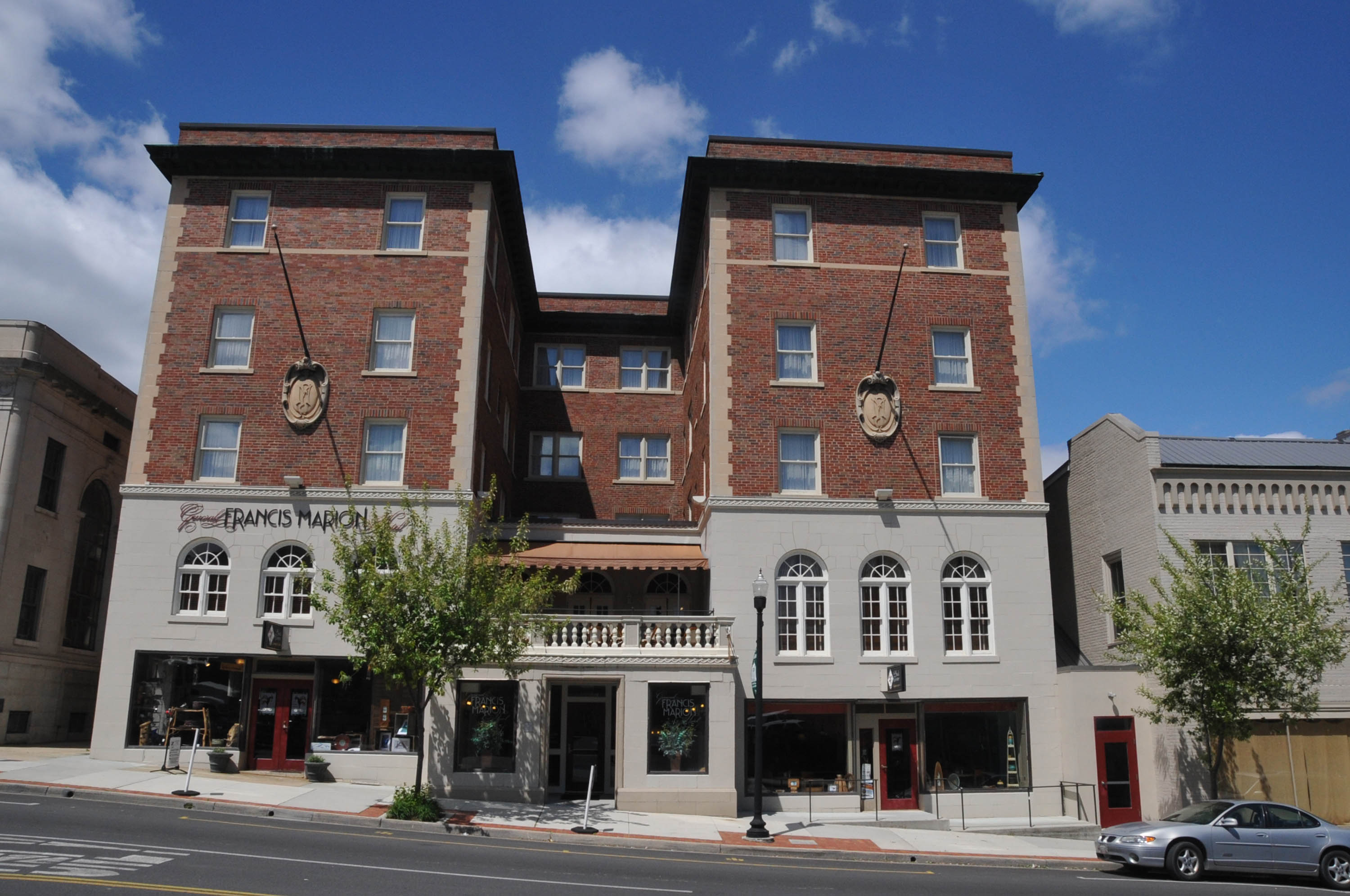
- Hotel Lincoln, April 2012

- Location within Virginia Location within the United States
- Location: 107 E. Main St., Marion, Virginia
- Coordinates: 36°49′59″N 81°31′10″W
- Area: less than one acre
- Built: 1926-1927
- Built by: Eubank & Caldwell
- Architect: Eubank & Caldwell
- Architectural style: Colonial Revival
- NRHP reference No.: 95000897
- VLR No.: 119-0010

Significant dates
- Added to NRHP: July 21, 1995
- Designated VLR: April 28, 1995

Hotel Lincoln, also known as the General Francis Marion Hotel and Lincoln Inn, is a historic hotel building located at Marion, Smyth County, Virginia. It was built in 1926–1927, and is a five-story, Colonial Revival style reinforced concrete commercial building. The upper floors are faced with Kingsport velveteen brick. The third through fifth floors are U-shaped and contain 19 guestrooms and 13 bathrooms per floor. It is one of the last remaining early-20th-century hotel buildings in Southwest Virginia. In addition to providing accommodations, the hotel offered space for public and private meetings, receptions, and dances. The building also contained a drugstore, coffee shop, beauty salon, and barber shop.

It was listed on the National Register of Historic Places in 1995. It is located in the Marion Historic District.
