= Lincoln Theatre (Marion, Virginia) =

Historic theatre in Virginia, US

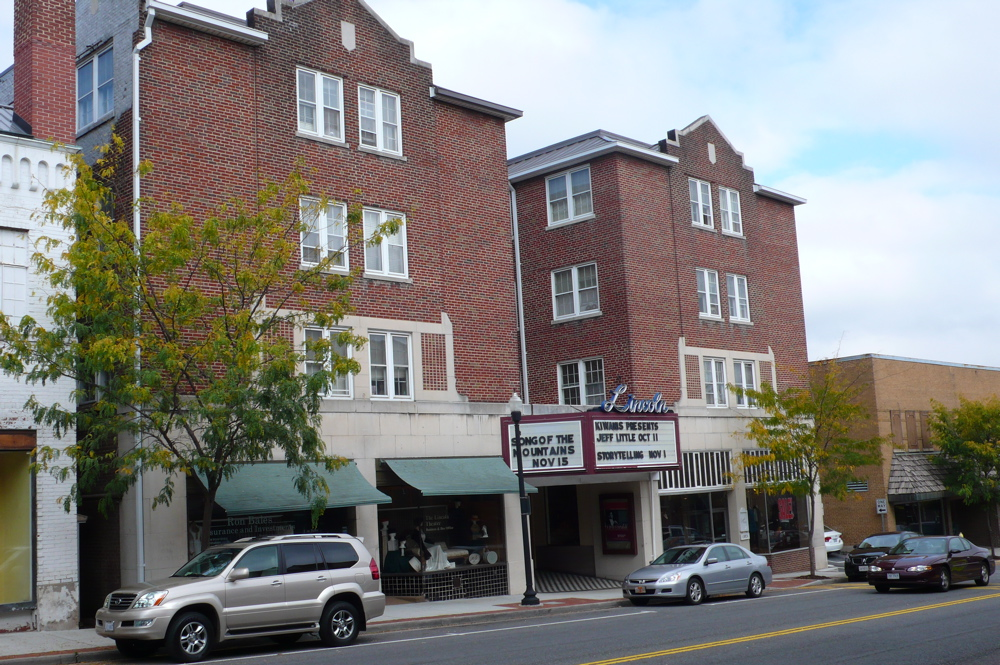
- Lincoln Theatre, October 2006
- Interactive map of Lincoln Theatre
- Address: 117 E. Main St.
- Location: Marion, Virginia
- Owner: The Lincoln Theatre, Inc.
- Capacity: 500
- Type: Theatre

Construction
- Opened: 1929
- Renovated: 2000
- Expanded: 2016
- Reopened: 2004

Website
- www.thelincoln.org
- Lincoln Theatre
- U.S. National Register of Historic Places
- U.S. Historic district – Contributing property
- Virginia Landmarks Register
- Location within Virginia Location within the United States
- Coordinates: 36°50′0″N 81°31′9″W
- Area: 0.2 acres (0.081 ha)
- Architect: Eubank & Caldwell; Novelty Scenic Studios
- Architectural style: Exotic Revival, Mayan Revival
- NRHP reference No.: 92001710
- VLR No.: 119-0009

Significant dates
- Added to NRHP: December 17, 1992
- Designated VLR: October 21, 1992

Lincoln Theatre is a historic theatre building located at Marion, Smyth County, Virginia. It was opened in 1929, and is a three-story theater located behind the Royal Oak Apartment House. Access to the theatre is through a broad arcade on the ground floor of the apartment house. The interior of the theatre is designed to suggest an ancient Mayan temple. It also features six large paintings, depicting scenes from American and local history. The theatre closed in 1977. It later reopened in 2004 as a community performing arts center.

It was listed on the National Register of Historic Places in 1992. It is located in the Marion Historic District.
