= McMullin, Virginia =

McMullin
- CDP
- Location within the Commonwealth of Virginia
- Coordinates: 36°49′3″N 81°34′31″W
- Country: United States
- State: Virginia
- County: Smyth

Population (2010)
  - Total: 464
- Time zone: UTC−5 (Eastern (EST))
  - Summer (DST): UTC−4 (EDT)
- ZIP codes: 24354
- FIPS code: 51-48445
- GNIS feature ID: 2629841

McMullin is a census-designated place in Smyth County, Virginia, United States. As of the 2020 census, McMullin had a population of 455.

Fox Farm site was listed on the National Register of Historic Places in 1978.

== Demographics ==
Historical population
Census	Pop.	Note	%±
2010	464		—
2020	455		−1.9%
U.S. Decennial Census; 2010 2020

McMullin was first listed as a census designated place in the 2010 U.S. census.
