= Marion station (Virginia) =

- Norfolk & Western Railway Depot
- U.S. National Register of Historic Places
- U.S. Historic district – Contributing property
- Virginia Landmarks Register
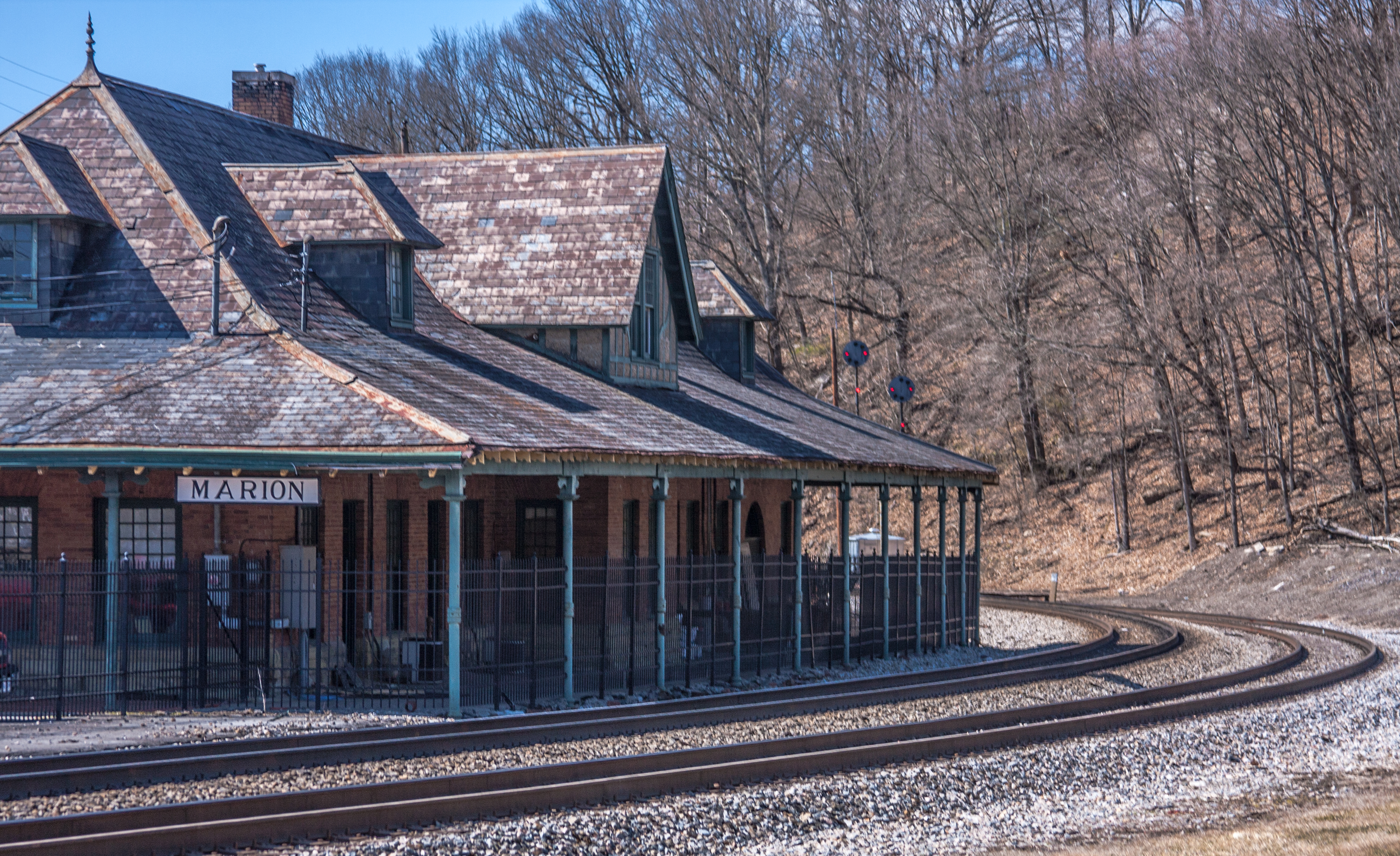
- Marion Depot, March 2013

- Location within Virginia Location within the United States
- Location: 651 N. Main St., Marion, Virginia
- Coordinates: 36°50′54″N 81°30′42″W
- Area: 2 acres (0.81 ha)
- Built: 1904
- Architect: Nesbit, J. C.
- Architectural style: Queen Anne
- NRHP reference No.: 95000025
- VLR No.: 119-0003

Significant dates
- Added to NRHP: February 8, 1995
- Designated VLR: October 19, 1994

Norfolk & Western Railway Depot is a historic railway depot located at Marion, Smyth County, Virginia. It was built in 1904 by the Norfolk and Western Railway. It is a one-story, stone and brick, Queen Anne style building. It features detailed porches supported by arching brackets on the street side and iron columns on the other three sides and a slate and shingled hipped roof with dormers. The building measures 25 feet by 128 feet, and has an attached former ticket office. The building was converted for office and retail use in 1993–1994.

It was listed on the National Register of Historic Places in 1995. It is located in the Marion Historic District.

Preceding station	Norfolk and Western Railway	Following station
Chilhowie toward Bristol	Bristol – Roanoke	Rural Retreat toward Roanoke
