= Henderson Building =

Historic building in Virginia, US

- Henderson Building, Southwestern State Hospital
- U.S. National Register of Historic Places
- Virginia Landmarks Register
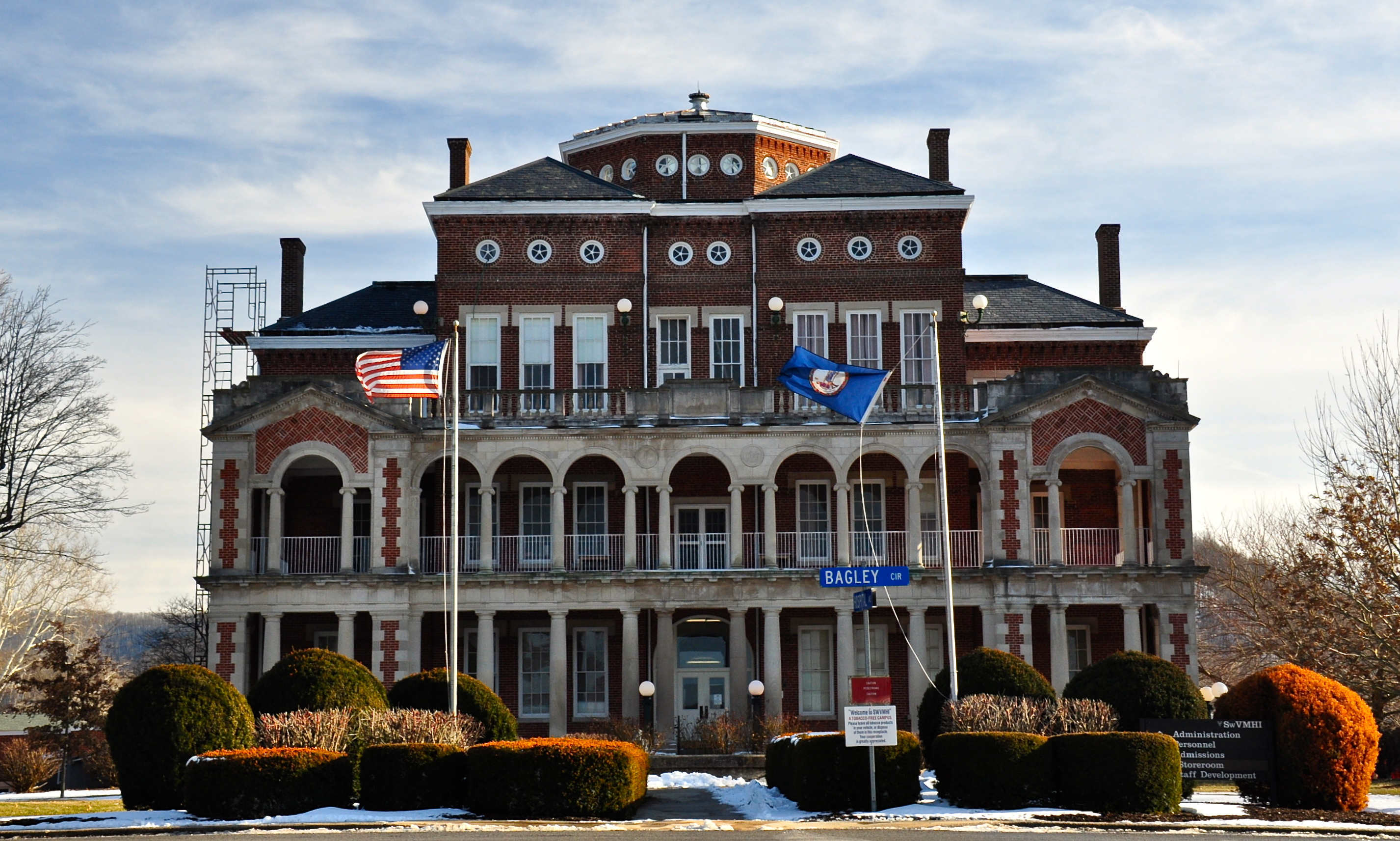
- Henderson Building, Southwestern Virginia Mental Health Institute, January 2014.

- Location within Virginia Location within the United States
- Location: E. Main St., Marion, Virginia
- Coordinates: 36°50′0″N 81°30′43″W
- Area: less than one acre
- Built: 1887, 1930-1931
- Architect: MacDonald Bros.; Lewman & Sweeney
- Architectural style: Classical Revival, Late Victorian
- NRHP reference No.: 89001919
- VLR No.: 119-0004

Significant dates
- Added to NRHP: December 21, 1990
- Designated VLR: February 21, 1989

Henderson Building is a historic administration building located on the campus of Southwestern Virginia Mental Health Institute at Marion, Smyth County, Virginia. It was built in 1887 in the Victorian style and remodeled in 1930–1931, in the Classical Revival style. When built, it was a four-story, brick building with a 118-foot clock tower. With the 1930-1931 remodeling, The tower was removed and replaced with an octagonal rotunda and the building reduced to three stories. A two-story front portico was also added. In accordance with the Kirkbride Plan, the building was once connected to three radiating three story ward wings. The wings were replaced in the 1980s.

It was listed on the National Register of Historic Places in 1990.
