= Konnarock Training School =

- U.S. National Register of Historic Places
- Virginia Landmarks Register
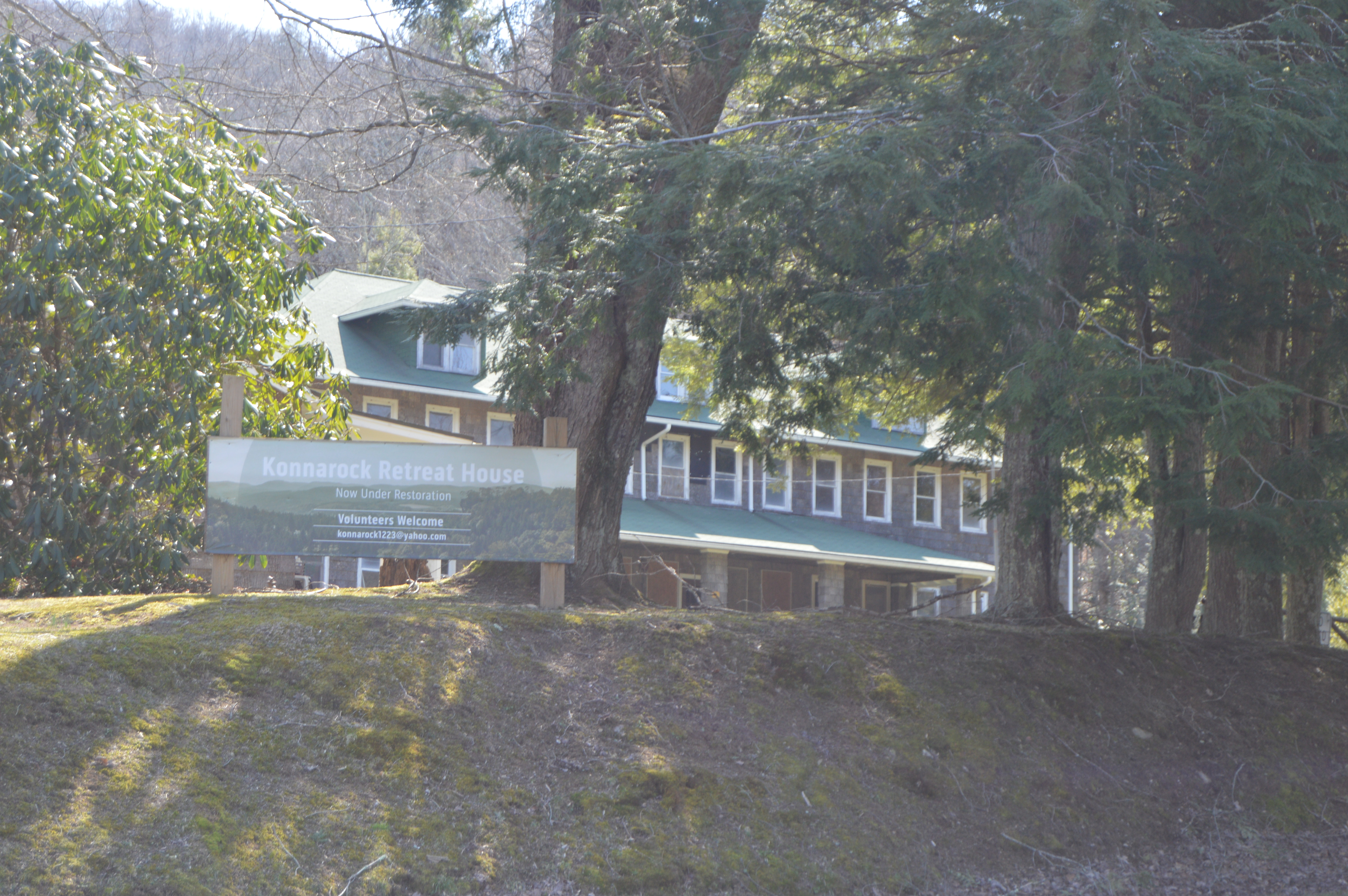
- Front of the main building

- Location within Virginia Location within the United States
- Location: Jct. of VA 603 and VA 600, Konnarock, Virginia
- Coordinates: 36°40′18″N 81°36′42″W
- Area: 18 acres (7.3 ha)
- Built: 1925
- Architect: Henry Carl Messerschmidt; R.E.L. Smith
- Architectural style: Bungalow/craftsman, Rustic
- NRHP reference No.: 97000483
- VLR No.: 086-0027

Significant dates
- Added to NRHP: June 5, 1997
- Designated VLR: March 19, 1997

Konnarock Training School, also known as Konnarock Lutheran Girls School, is a historic school complex located at Konnarock, Smyth County, Virginia. The main building was built in 1925, and is a 2 1/2-story, 14 bay, hipped roof, Rustic style wood-frame building. It is sheathed in bark shingles and has an attached rear chapel. Also on the property are an American Craftsman-style chestnut bark-shingled bungalow (1936) originally used as the school's Health Center, a collapsed two-car garage, an arbor and a farm complex. The property was original developed by the Lutheran church as a mission to the southern Appalachians. The school closed in 1958, and was later acquired by the Forest Service.

It was listed on the National Register of Historic Places in 1997.

It was restored in 2022 and is now used by the Blue Ridge Discovery Center, a non-profit organization that specializes in educating about nature.
