= Old Stone Tavern (Atkins, Virginia) =

Historic commercial building in Virginia, United States

- U.S. National Register of Historic Places
- Virginia Landmarks Register
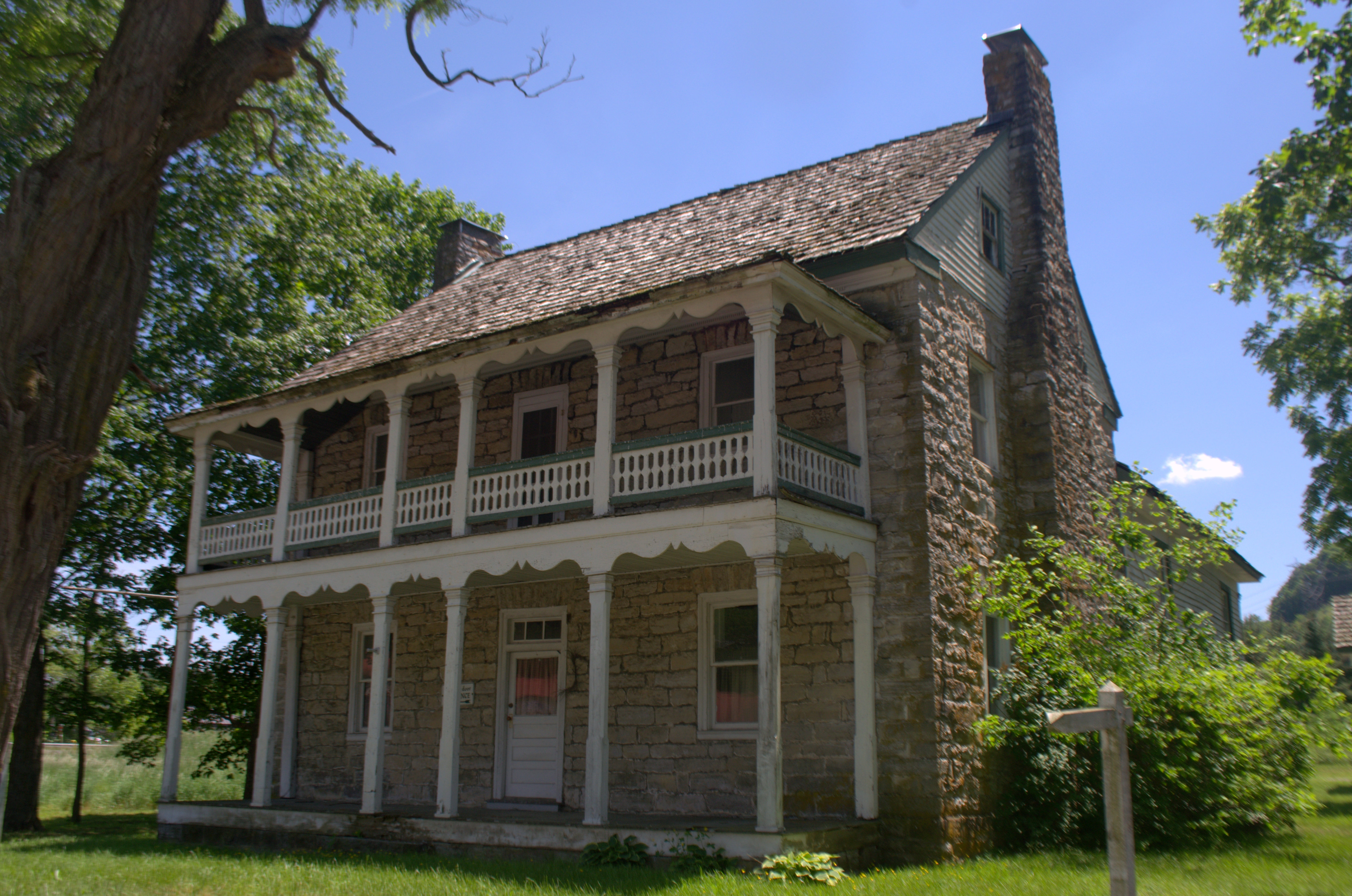

- Location within Virginia Location within the United States
- Location: US 11, near Atkins, Virginia
- Coordinates: 36°51′51″N 81°26′12″W
- Area: 0.3 acres (0.12 ha)
- Built: c. 1815
- NRHP reference No.: 82004595
- VLR No.: 086-0002

Significant dates
- Added to NRHP: July 8, 1982
- Designated VLR: March 17, 1981

Old Stone Tavern, also known as Rock House, is a historic inn and tavern located near Atkins, Smyth County, Virginia. It was built by Frederick Cullop before 1815, and is a two-story, three-bay, limestone structure with a central-hall plan. A frame rear ell was added in the mid-19th century. It has a side-gable roof. The front facade features a mid-19th-century porch supported by chamfered columns connected on each level by a decorative cyma frieze and sawn balustrade. The tavern was built to accommodate travelers in the heavy migration through Cumberland Gap to the west in the early 19th century.

It received Virginia Landmark status in 1981 (VLR Listing Date 03/17/1981)–– and was listed on the National Register of Historic Places in 1982.
