= Marion Male Academy =

Historic school building in Virginia, US

- U.S. National Register of Historic Places
- U.S. Historic district – Contributing property
- Virginia Landmarks Register
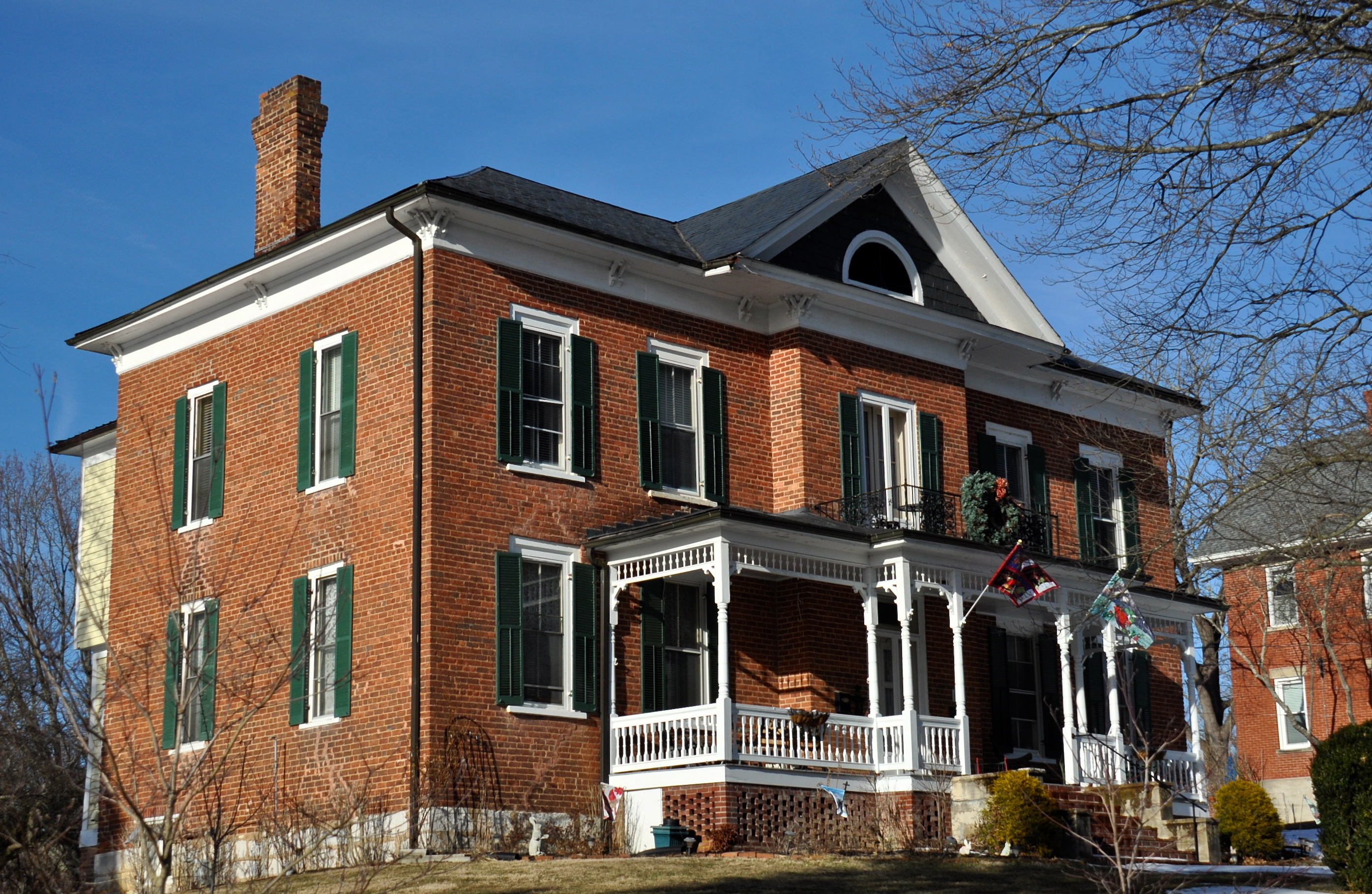
- Marion Male Academy, January 2014.

- Location within Virginia Location within the United States
- Location: 343 College St., Marion, Virginia
- Coordinates: 36°49′52″N 81°31′35″W
- Area: 1.7 acres (0.69 ha)
- Built: 1876
- Architectural style: Italianate
- NRHP reference No.: 89001915
- VLR No.: 119-0006

Significant dates
- Added to NRHP: November 2, 1989
- Designated VLR: August 15, 1989

Marion Male Academy, also known as Marion Male High School, is a historic school building located at Marion, Smyth County, Virginia. It was built in 1876, and is a two-story, five-bay, hipped roof, Italianate style brick building. The school closed in 1893, with the construction of the Marion Public High School. In 1901, it was renovated for residential use.

It was listed on the National Register of Historic Places in 1989. It is located in the Marion Historic District.
