= Fox Farm site (McMullin, Virginia) =

Archaeological site in Virginia, United States

- Fox Farm Site
- U.S. National Register of Historic Places
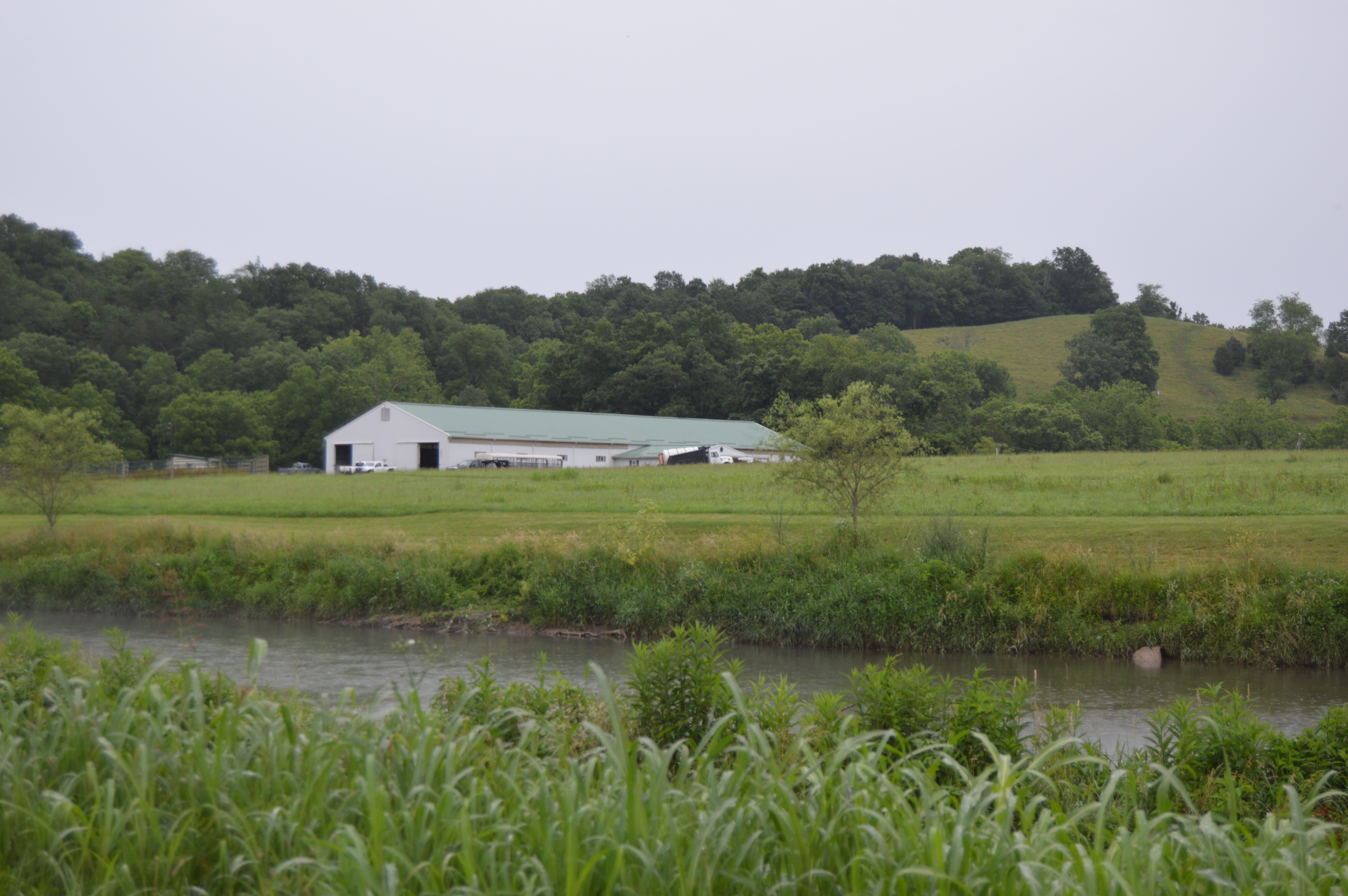
- Overview of the site
- Nearest city: McMullin, Virginia
- Area: 5 acres (2.0 ha)
- NRHP reference No.: 78003045
- Added to NRHP: June 23, 1978

The Fox Farm Site encompasses the archaeological remains of a prehistoric Native American settlement near McMullin, Smyth County, Virginia. The site, located in the horseshoe bend of the middle fork of the Holston River, was occupied during the Late Woodland Period (c. 1300-1400). Finds at the site include marine beadwork, indicating trade with natives living along the Atlantic coast, as well as pottery remains diagnostic of several regional cultures.

The site was listed on the National Register of Historic Places in 1978.

== See also ==
- National Register of Historic Places listings in Smyth County, Virginia
