= Konnarock, Virginia =

Unincorporated community in Virginia, US

Coordinates: 36°39′57″N 81°38′17″W

Konnarock is an unincorporated community in Washington and Smyth counties in the U.S. state of Virginia. Konnarock Training School was listed on the National Register of Historic Places in 1997.
