= Chilhowie Methodist Episcopal Church =

Historic church in Virginia, United States

- U.S. National Register of Historic Places
- Virginia Landmarks Register
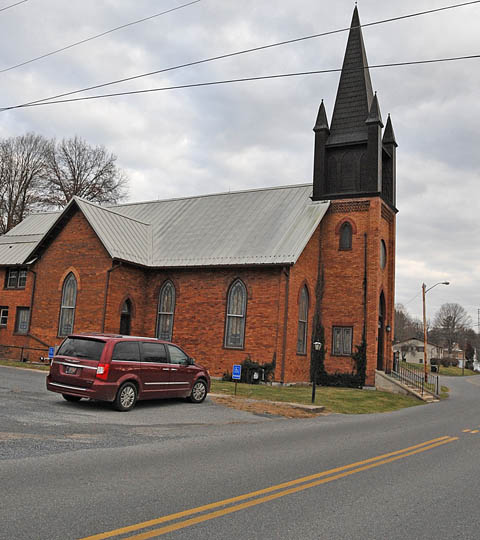

- Location within Virginia Location within the United States
- Location: 501 Old Stage Rd., Chilhowie, Virginia
- Coordinates: 36°48′9″N 81°40′56″W
- Area: less than one acre
- Built: 1893-1894
- Architectural style: Late Gothic Revival
- NRHP reference No.: 91000830
- VLR No.: 189-0015

Significant dates
- Added to NRHP: July 3, 1991
- Designated VLR: April 17, 1991

Chilhowie Methodist Episcopal Church, also known as Chilhowie United Methodist Church, is a historic Methodist Episcopal church located at Chilhowie, Smyth County, Virginia. It was built in 1893–1894, and is a cruciform plan, golden brown brick, Late Gothic Revival-style church. It has a gable roof and a central front projecting bell tower. The church features lancet windows, a stained glass rose window, and a vaulted ceiling.

It was listed on the National Register of Historic Places in 1991.
