= Downtown Chilhowie Historic District =

Historic district in Virginia, United States

- U.S. National Register of Historic Places
- U.S. Historic district
- Virginia Landmarks Register
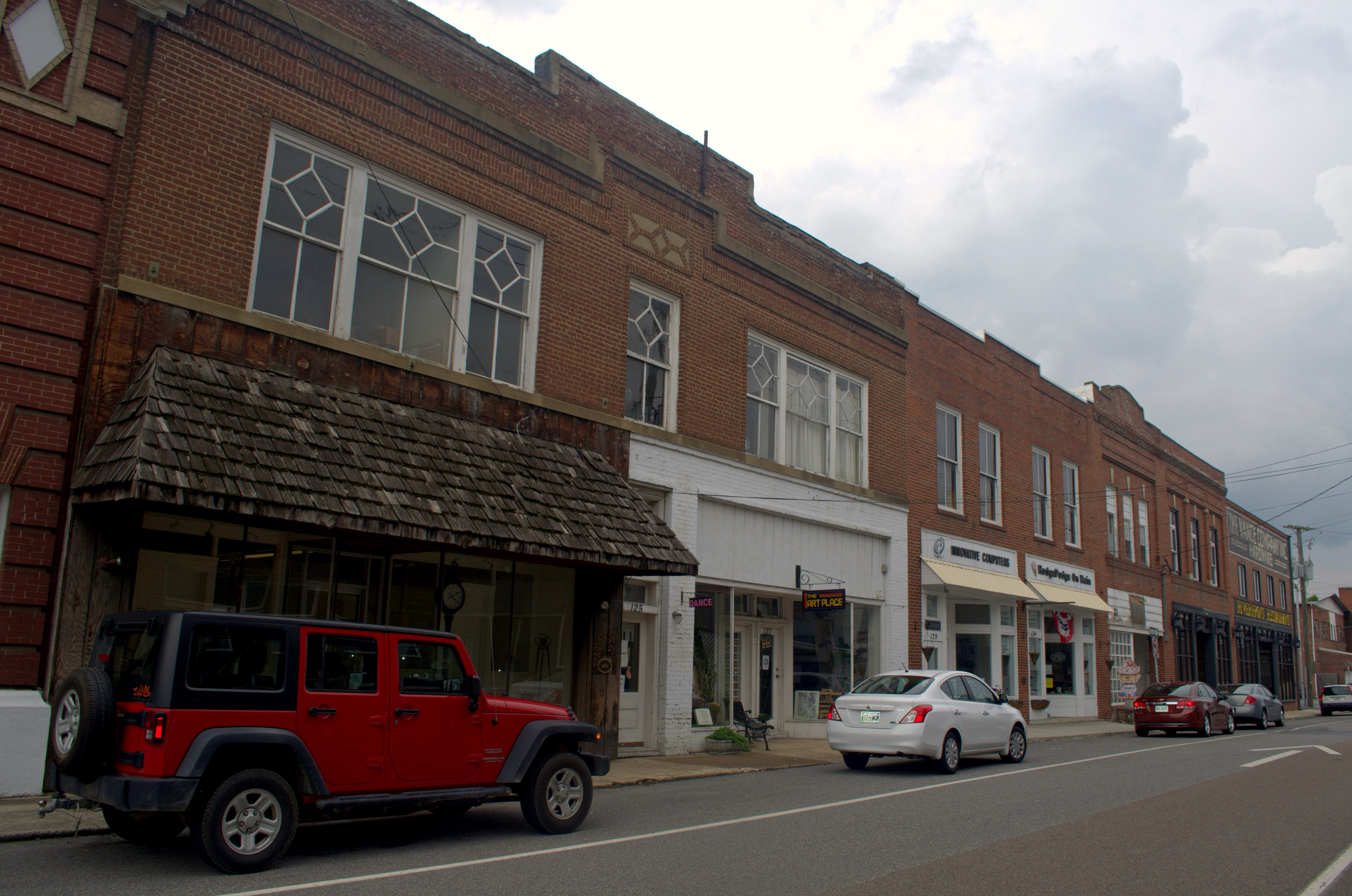
- Downtown Chilhowie Historic District, July 2013

- Location within Virginia Location within the United States
- Location: Main St. S. Whitetop Rd. and Lee Hwy., Chilhowie, Virginia
- Coordinates: 36°47′54″N 81°40′53″W
- Area: 2 acres (0.81 ha)
- Built: 1913
- Architectural style: Beaux Arts
- NRHP reference No.: 00000065
- VLR No.: 189-0001

Significant dates
- Added to NRHP: February 4, 2000
- Designated VLR: December 1, 1999

Downtown Chilhowie Historic District is a national historic district located at Chilhowie, Smyth County, Virginia, United States.

== Amenities ==
The district includes 11 contributing buildings in the central business district of Chilhowie. These commercial buildings were largely constructed after a fire in 1909 destroyed the commercial block. Notable buildings include the Chilhowie Hardware Company (1909), the Beaux-Arts style National Bank of Chilhowie (1909), Chilhowie Drug Company (1916), Bonham Motor Company (c. 1920), and Southern Air Restaurant (1947).

== Listed ==
It was listed on the National Register of Historic Places in 2000.
