= Abijah Thomas House =

Historic house in Virginia, United States

- U.S. National Register of Historic Places
- Virginia Landmarks Register
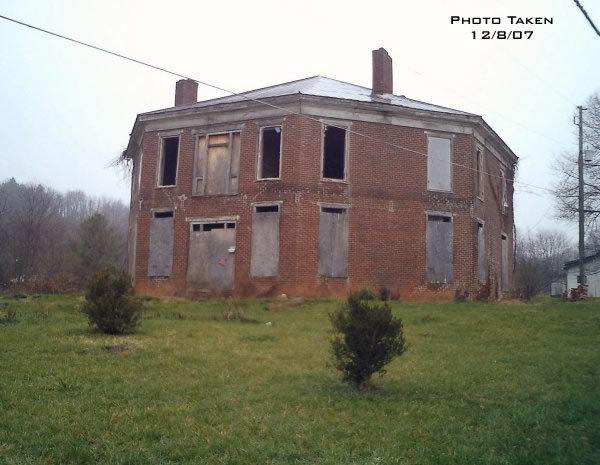
- Picture taken on 12/7/07

- Location within Virginia Location within the United States
- Nearest city: SW of Marion on VA 657, Marion, Virginia
- Coordinates: 36°46′27″N 81°34′13″W
- Built: 1856
- Architect: Thomas, Abijah
- Architectural style: Octagon Mode
- NRHP reference No.: 80004225
- VLR No.: 086-0004

Significant dates
- Added to NRHP: November 28, 1980
- Designated VLR: September 16, 1980

The Abijah Thomas House is an historic octagon house located southwest of Marion, Virginia, United States, on VA 657. Built in 1856, it was added to the National Register of Historic Places on November 28, 1980.

== Architecture ==
The Abijah Thomas House is an octagon house, which is part of the trend of octagon architecture of 1850s America. The building consists of seventeen rooms, ten closets, and a storage room. The exterior walls are made of brick, which were made by slaves on the property. Interior design wise, the house features a rare example of painted ashlar upon plaster wall. Other interior touches include graining, marbleizing and stenciling.

== History ==
The house was completed in 1857, for Abijah Thomas of Smyth County, who was a property and slave owner, and the owner of a textile plant. The house and the property around it consisted of 400 acres, and was assessed at being worth $5,000 in 1857.

=== Today ===
The house sat abandoned for many years and is currently owned by a local resident who seeks to renovate it back to its historical style. Ghosts have been reported as being seen on site, specifically in the home's storage room, called the "dark room," by locals. Reports have claimed the appearance of abused slaves, including the sound of shackles moving and blood dripping down interior walls. Despite local beliefs that slaves were abused within the "dark room," historian Mark Sturgill believes that stains on the floorboards of the storage room were caused by food spills from canned jars kept in the room, not from blood stains.

== Images ==
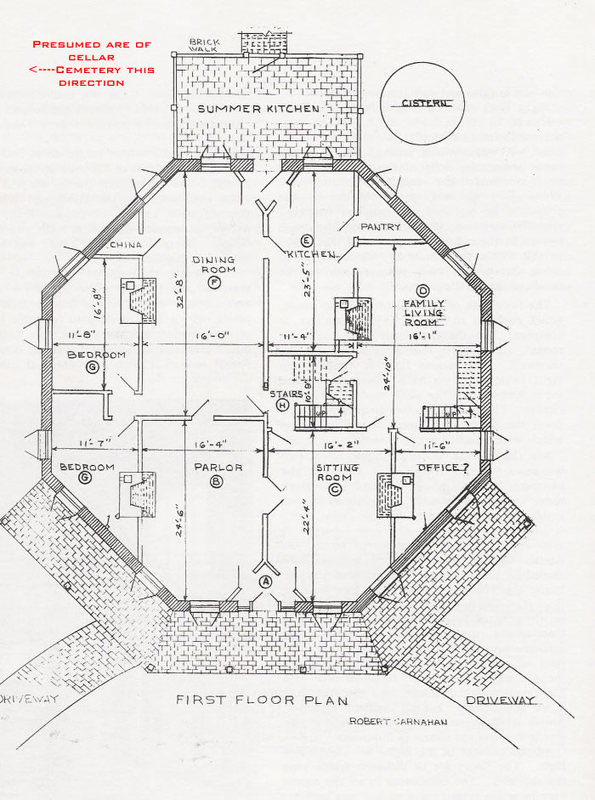
First floor plan taken from the original blueprints thought to have been used.

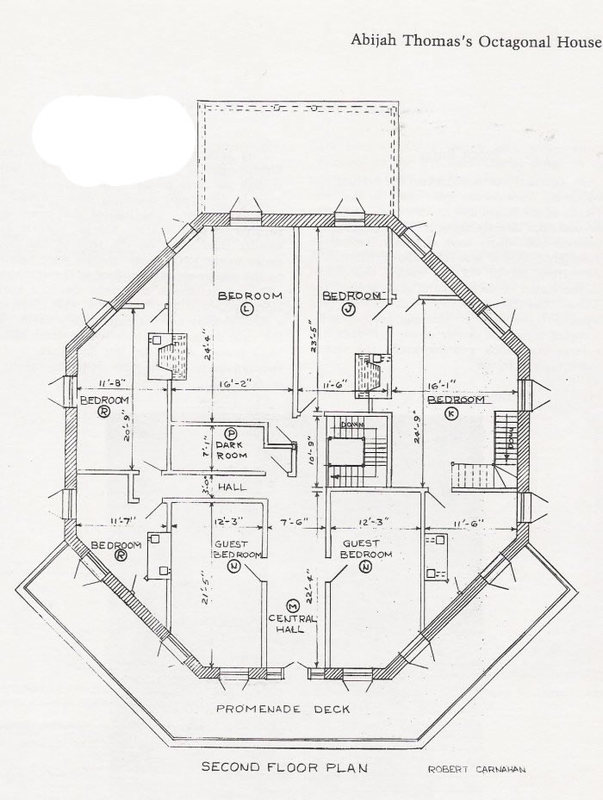
Second floor plan taken from the original blueprints thought to have been used.
