= Chilhowie, Virginia =

Town of Chilhowie, Virginia
- Town
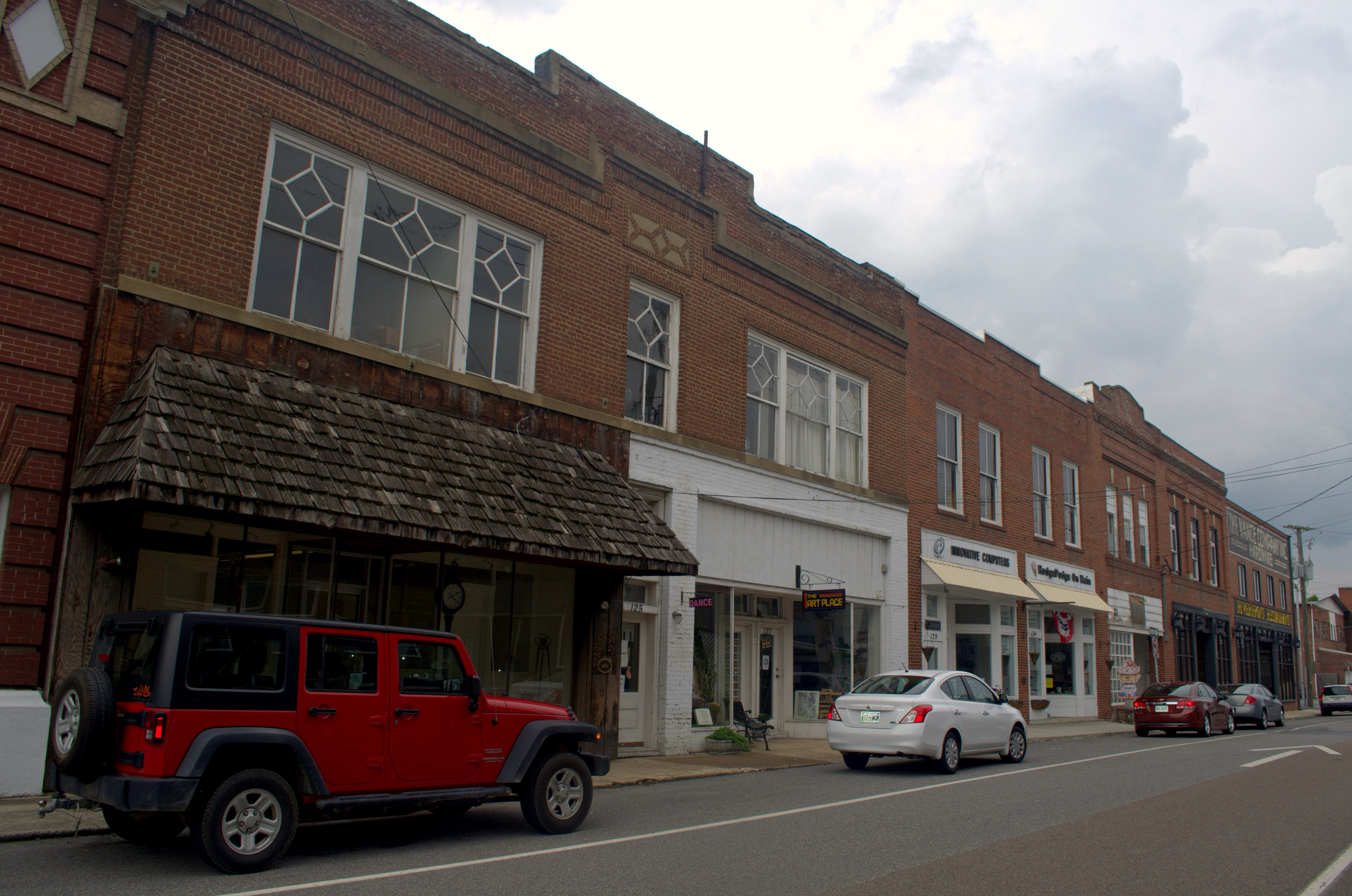

- Seal

- Location in the Commonwealth of Virginia Chilhowie (the United States)
- Coordinates: 36°48′0″N 81°40′52″W
- Country: United States
- State: Virginia
- County: Smyth

Government
  - Mayor: Gary Heninger

Area
  - Total: 2.57 sq mi (6.66 km^{2})
  - Land: 2.53 sq mi (6.56 km^{2})
  - Water: 0.039 sq mi (0.10 km^{2})
- Elevation: 1,952 ft (595 m)

Population (2020)
  - Total: 1,654
  - Estimate (2020): 1,698
  - Density: 671.6/sq mi (259.32/km^{2})
- U.S. Census Bureau, 2000 Population Estimates
- Time zone: UTC-5 (EST)
  - Summer (DST): UTC-4 (EDT)
- ZIP code: 24319
- Area code: 276
- FIPS code: 51-16480
- GNIS feature ID: 1464850
- Website: http://www.chilhowie.org/

Chilhowie /tʃɪlˈhaʊi/ is a town in Smyth County, Virginia, United States, on the Middle Fork of the Holston River. As of the 2020 census, Chilhowie had a population of 1,654. The name Chilhowie is said to come from a Cherokee word meaning "valley of many deer". It is also notable for having only one traffic light in the entire city. I-81 runs through Chilhowie. It is located at exit 35.

== Geography ==
According to the United States Census Bureau, the town has a total area of 2.6 square miles (6.7 km^{2}), all land.

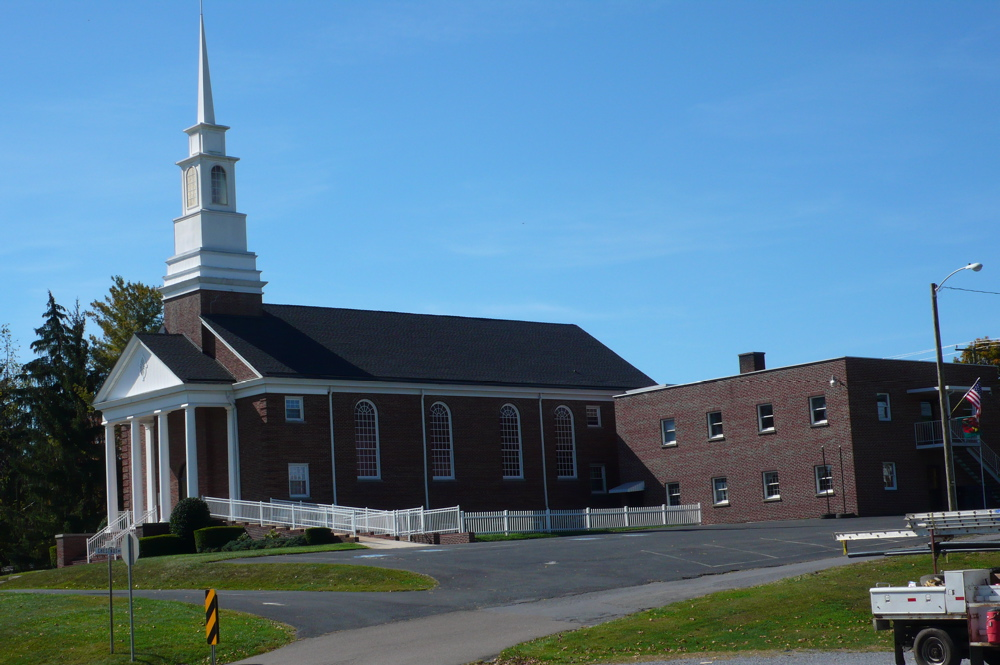
The Chilhowie Baptist Church on U.S. Route 11 in Chilhowie, Virginia.

== History ==
Chilhowie was often the starting point of longhunter expeditions in the 1700s. In 1748 the area was visited by Colonel James Patton and Dr. Thomas Walker. They constructed a small fort, likely just a blockhouse. An early settler was Samuel Stalnaker (1715-1769) who converted Patton's fort into a tavern known as the Town House, and lived there until the late 1760s. The town sustained severe damage from an EF-2 tornado during the 2011 Super Outbreak.

A.C. Beatie House, H.L. Bonham House, Chilhowie Methodist Episcopal Church, and the Downtown Chilhowie Historic District are listed on the National Register of Historic Places.

== Demographics ==
Historical population
Census	Pop.	Note	%±
1920	572		—
1930	712		24.5%
1940	889		24.9%
1950	1,022		15.0%
1960	1,169		14.4%
1970	1,317		12.7%
1980	1,265		−3.9%
1990	1,960		54.9%
2000	1,827		−6.8%
2010	1,781		−2.5%
2020	1,654		−7.1%

=== 2020 census ===
As of the 2020 census, Chilhowie had a population of 1,654. The median age was 47.9 years. 18.8% of residents were under the age of 18 and 25.4% of residents were 65 years of age or older. For every 100 females there were 85.8 males, and for every 100 females age 18 and over there were 84.5 males age 18 and over.

0.0% of residents lived in urban areas, while 100.0% lived in rural areas.

There were 671 households in Chilhowie, of which 26.2% had children under the age of 18 living in them. Of all households, 41.7% were married-couple households, 19.8% were households with a male householder and no spouse or partner present, and 31.0% were households with a female householder and no spouse or partner present. About 32.5% of all households were made up of individuals and 15.4% had someone living alone who was 65 years of age or older.

There were 759 housing units, of which 11.6% were vacant. The homeowner vacancy rate was 0.2% and the rental vacancy rate was 7.5%.

Racial composition as of the 2020 census
Race	Number	Percent
White	1,497	90.5%
Black or African American	40	2.4%
American Indian and Alaska Native	2	0.1%
Asian	0	0.0%
Native Hawaiian and Other Pacific Islander	0	0.0%
Some other race	36	2.2%
Two or more races	79	4.8%
Hispanic or Latino (of any race)	80	4.8%

=== 2000 census ===
As of the 2000 census, there were 1,827 people, 708 households, and 462 families living in the town. The population density was 704.6 people per square mile (272.4/km^{2}). There were 775 housing units at an average density of 298.9 per square mile (115.5/km^{2}). The racial makeup of the town was 94.47% White, 3.07% African American, 0.33% Native American, 0.05% Asian, 1.48% from other races, and 0.60% from two or more races. Hispanic or Latino of any race were 2.13% of the population.

Out of a total of 708 households, 24.7% had children under the age of 18 living with them, 49.2% were married couples living together, 11.4% had a female householder with no husband present, and 34.7% were non-families. 31.5% of households were made up of individuals, and 15.4% were one person aged 65 or older. The average household size was 2.22 and the average family size was 2.76.

The age distribution was 17.2% under the age of 18, 5.4% from 18 to 24, 24.2% from 25 to 44, 24.4% from 45 to 64, and 28.8% 65 or older. The median age was 47 years. For every 100 females, there were 78.9 males. For every 100 females age 18 and over, there were 76.0 males.

The median household income was US$28,266, and the median family income was US$34,375. Males had a median income of US$24,306 compared with US$18,080 for females. The per capita income for the town was US$16,657. About 10.3% of families and 13.4% of the population were below the poverty line, including 18.5% of those under age 18 and 9.5% of those age 65 or over.

== Notable people ==
- Samuel Stalnaker (1715-1769) built the first cabin in the area in 1749.
- Chris Marion of the Little River Band
- Eric McClure, a NASCAR driver;
- "Nature Boy" Buddy Landel, a professional wrestler.
- Andrew "Nick" Cullop, MLB Pitcher 1913-1921.
- Cody McMahan, NASCAR driver.

== Climate ==
The climate in this area features moderate differences between highs and lows, and there is adequate rainfall year-round. According to the Köppen Climate Classification system, Chilhowie has a marine west coast climate, abbreviated "Cfb" on climate maps.
