= R. T. Greer and Company (Marion, Virginia) =

Historic commercial building in Virginia, US

- U.S. National Register of Historic Places
- Virginia Landmarks Register
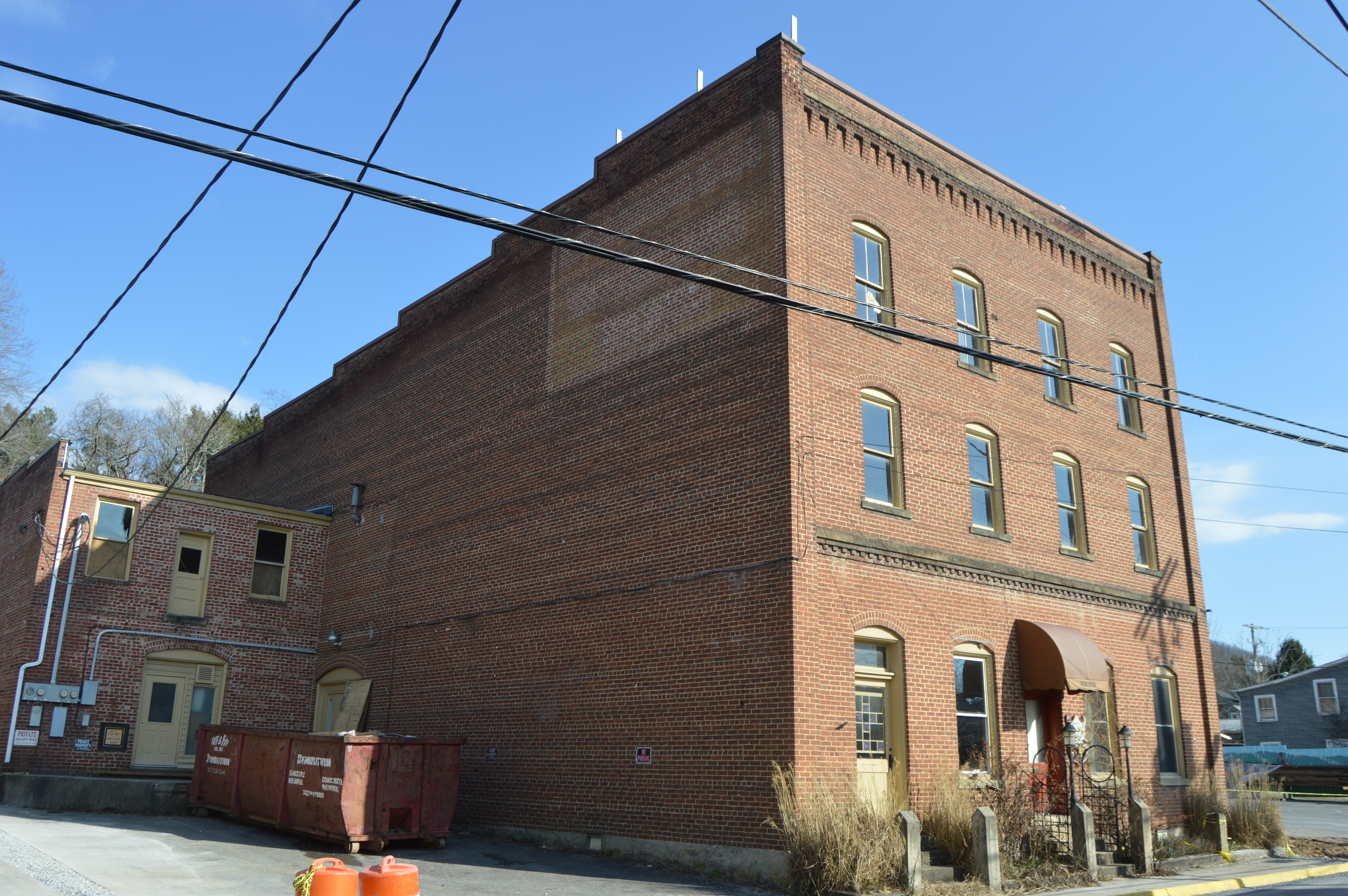
- Front and northern side

- Location within Virginia Location within the United States
- Location: 107 Pendleton St., Marion, Virginia
- Coordinates: 36°50′4″N 81°30′58″W
- Area: 0.3 acres (0.12 ha)
- Built: 1916; 110 years ago
- Architect: multiple
- Architectural style: Early Commercial
- NRHP reference No.: 97000481
- VLR No.: 119-0012-19

Significant dates
- Added to NRHP: May 23, 1997
- Designated VLR: March 19, 1997

R. T. Greer and Company is a historic commercial building located at Marion, Smyth County, Virginia. It was built in 1916. R. T. Greer and Company was the Appalachian region's largest dealer in medicinal herbs. They remained in business until 1968. It is occupied by the Herb House Trading Company, Inc.

It was listed on the National Register of Historic Places in 1997.
