= Marion, Virginia =

Town of Marion, Virginia
- Town
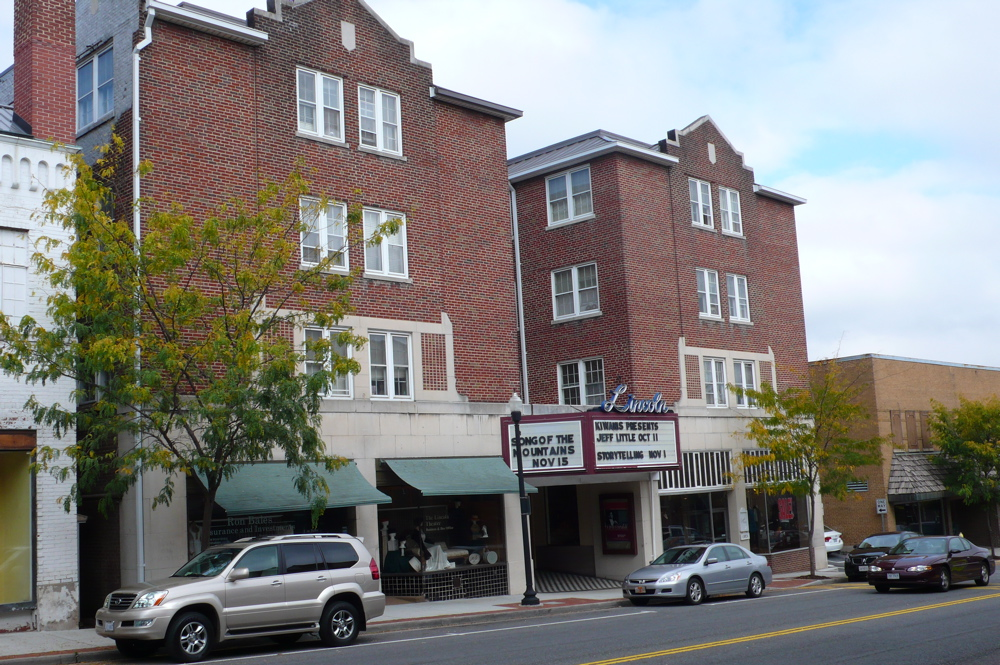
- The Lincoln Theatre in Marion, Virginia.

- Seal
- Motto: America's Coolest Hometown
- Location in the Commonwealth of Virginia Marion (the United States)
- Coordinates: 36°50′N 81°31′W
- Country: United States
- State: Virginia
- County: Smyth

Area
  - Town: 4.15 sq mi (10.76 km^{2})
  - Land: 4.13 sq mi (10.69 km^{2})
  - Water: 0.031 sq mi (0.08 km^{2})
- Elevation: 2,500 ft (760 m)

Population (2020)
  - Town: 6,022
  - Density: 1,393.4/sq mi (537.98/km^{2})
  - Metro: Approximately 14,500 total population
- Time zone: UTC−5 (EST)
  - Summer (DST): UTC−4 (EDT)
- ZIP code: 24354
- Area code: 276
- FIPS code: 51-49464
- GNIS feature ID: 1498513
- Website: www.marionva.org

Marion is a town in and the county seat of Smyth County, Virginia, United States. It is positioned upon Interstate 81, in the Blue Ridge portion of the southern Appalachian Mountains in Southwest Virginia. The town is named for American Revolutionary War officer Francis Marion. Within the town limits it had a population of approximately 6,000, per 2020 Census counts. However, together with the neighborhoods, an additional 9,000 residents residing in unincorporated Smyth County have Marion mailing addresses, granting the Marion ZIP code (24354) a total population of about 14,500, which is approximately half of the county's total population.

== Geography ==
Marion is the location of two large side-by-side ground storage water tower tanks, which are separately labeled "HOT" (in red letters) and "COLD" (in blue). The landmarks, positioned just off of Marion exit 47, are visible to both north and south bound Interstate 81 traffic lanes.

According to the United States Census Bureau, the town has a total area of 5.2 square miles (10.7 km^{2}), all land.

Marion is home to Hungry Mother State Park, one of the six original Virginia State Parks from the 1930s.

== Demographics ==
Historical population
Census	Pop.	Note	%±
1860	445		—
1870	368		−17.3%
1880	919		149.7%
1890	1,651		79.7%
1900	2,045		23.9%
1910	2,727		33.3%
1920	3,253		19.3%
1930	4,156		27.8%
1940	5,177		24.6%
1950	6,982		34.9%
1960	8,385		20.1%
1970	8,158		−2.7%
1980	7,287		−10.7%
1990	6,858		−5.9%
2000	6,503		−5.2%
2010	6,294		−3.2%
2020	6,022		−4.3%

=== 2020 census ===
Marion Racial Composition
Race	Num.	Perc.
White	5,213	87.17%
Black or African American	261	4.54%
Native American	12	0.21%
Asian	59	1.03%
Pacific Islander	1	0.02%
Other/Mixed	224	3.89%
Hispanic or Latino	181	3.15%

As of the 2020 United States Census, there were 6,022 people, 2,573 households, and 1,394 families residing within the town limits.

=== 2000 census ===
As of the census of 2000, there were 6,503 people, 2,677 households, and 1,648 families residing in the town. The population density was 1,528.3 people per square mile (590.7/km^{2}). There were 2,865 housing units at an average density of 689.6 per square mile (266.6/km^{2}). The racial makeup of the town was 91.98% White, 5.94% African American, 0.24% Native American, 0.52% Asian, 0.02% Pacific Islander, 0.38% from other races, and 0.93% from two or more races. Hispanic or Latino of any race were 1.13% of the population.

There were 2,677 households, out of which 24.4% had children under the age of 18 living with them, 42.6% were married couples living together, 14.3% had a female householder with no husband present, and 39.0% were non-families. 36.5% of all households were made up of individuals, and 19.3% had someone living alone who was 65 years of age or older. The average household size was 2.13 and the average family size was 2.76.

In the town, the population was spread out, with 19.4% under the age of 18, 9.7% from 18 to 24, 26.0% from 25 to 44, 24.2% from 45 to 64, and 20.7% who were 65 years of age or older. The median age was 42 years. For every 100 females, there were 88.1 males. For every 100 females aged 18 and over, there were 86.2 males.

The current (2020) median income for a household in the town is $54,652.

== History ==
Marion College, a two-year Lutheran women's college, operated from 1873 to 1967. Marion Hall, constructed in 1968 and named in honor of Francis Marion, is a residence hall at Roanoke College.

Marion is also home to Southwestern Virginia Mental Health Institute, continuously operational since May 1887.

In December 1864, during the Civil War, it was the site of the Battle of Marion.

Marion is the birthplace of the soft drink Mountain Dew. Although Mountain Dew was first marketed under that name in Knoxville, TN, the original soft drink's formula changed drastically from Knoxville's formula to the syrup mixture that constitutes today's drink, which is Marion's version. In 1961, the rights to Mountain Dew were purchased by the Marion-based Tip Corporation. The Mountain Dew flavor was reworked by Marion resident William H. "Bill" Jones. Due to the success of the revised formulation, the Pepsi Corporation purchased the Tip Corporation in 1964. Marion hosted the Mountain Dew Festival for more than 50 years. As of 2026 plans for the implementation of a Mountain Dew Museum to be located in Marion’s downtown area are in the early stages of development.

The Emory and Henry College School of Health Sciences was established in 2014.

Back of the Dragon, a segment of SR16 popular among motorcycle and sports car enthusiasts for its sharp turns and scenic overlooks, begins in Marion, Virginia.

Marion's Park Place Drive-In Theatre, originally constructed in 1954, was named the 6th best drive-in theatre in the United States by USA Today in May 2025.

R. T. Greer and Company, Henderson Building, Hotel Lincoln, Hungry Mother State Park Historic District, Lincoln Theatre, Marion Historic District, Marion Male Academy, Norfolk & Western Railway Depot, Preston House, and the Abijah Thomas House are listed on the National Register of Historic Places.

In late September 2024, the town suffered from flooding and destruction from the impacts of Hurricane Helene.

== Notable people ==
- Sherwood Anderson (1876–1941), American author/ New York Times best seller, Marion resident, was buried in Marion.
- William Pat Jennings (1919–1994) 28th Clerk of the United States House of Representatives.
- Katherine Johnson (1918–2020), an American NASA mathematician, portrayed in the film Hidden Figures, taught in Marion.
- Otho B. Rosenbaum, (1871–1962), U.S. Army brigadier general
- Nolan Ryan, Major League Baseball's Hall of Fame pitcher, was assigned to a minor league team in the Appalachian League called the Marion Mets (1965–1976) in Marion.
- Billy Wagner, 7X All-Star Major League Baseball pitcher and member of the National Baseball Hall of Fame (2025).
- Ernie Lindsey, novelist most known for Sara's Game (2012)
- Annie Jones Elliot (1865-1902), American bearded woman who toured with P.T. Barnum

== Climate ==
The climate in this area has mild differences between highs and lows, and there is adequate rainfall year-round. According to the Köppen Climate Classification system, Marion has a humid subtropical climate, abbreviated "Cfb" on climate maps. Marion's normal temperature numbers are typically at or near 45/25 F in January (coldest month), and 85/65 F in July (warmest month).
