= List of U.S. county name etymologies (A–D) =

This is a list of U.S. county name etymologies, covering the letters A to D.

== A ==
| County name | State | Name origin |
|---|---|---|
| Abbeville County | South Carolina | The French town of Abbeville |
| Acadia Parish | Louisiana | The French colonial region of Acadia |
| Accomack County | Virginia | From accawmacke, a Native American word meaning across the water place, describing the Eastern Shore of Virginia and the Accawmack people who lived there. |
| Ada County | Idaho | Ada Riggs, the first pioneer child born in the area and the daughter of H.C. Riggs, a cofounder of Boise |
| Adair County | Iowa | John Adair, a general in the War of 1812 and the eighth governor of Kentucky |
| Adair County | Kentucky | John Adair, a general in the War of 1812 and the eighth governor of Kentucky |
| Adair County | Missouri | John Adair, a general in the War of 1812 and the eighth governor of Kentucky |
| Adair County | Oklahoma | The Adair family of the Cherokee tribe |
| Adams County | Colorado | Alva Adams, the fifth governor of Colorado |
| Adams County | Idaho | John Adams, the second president of the United States |
| Adams County | Iowa | John Adams, the second president of the United States |
| Adams County | Mississippi | John Adams, the second president of the United States |
| Adams County | Nebraska | John Adams, the second president of the United States |
| Adams County | Ohio | John Adams, the second president of the United States |
| Adams County | Pennsylvania | John Adams, the second president of the United States |
| Adams County | Washington | John Adams, the second president of the United States |
| Adams County | Illinois | John Quincy Adams, the sixth president of the United States |
| Adams County | Indiana | John Quincy Adams, the sixth president of the United States |
| Adams County | Wisconsin | John Quincy Adams, the sixth president of the United States |
| Adams County | North Dakota | John Quincy Adams, a railroad agent who was instrumental in having the Chicago, Milwaukee and St. Paul Railway be built through North Dakota |
| Addison County | Vermont | Joseph Addison, the English writer and politician |
| Aiken County | South Carolina | William Aiken, the first president of the South Carolina Canal and Rail Road Company |
| Aitkin County | Minnesota | William Alexander Aitken, a fur trader in the region |
| Alachua County | Florida | Native American word meaning "sinkhole" in either the Muskogee or Timucua languages |
| Alamance County | North Carolina | The Battle of Alamance, which occurred on Big Alamance Creek, which was named for a local Native American word for the blue mud found in the creek |
| Alameda County | California | Spanish for cottonwood grove |
| Alamosa County | Colorado | Spanish word meaning of cottonwood |
| Albany County | New York | King James II, who was Duke of Albany before his accession |
| Albany County | Wyoming | The city of Albany, New York |
| Albemarle County | Virginia | Willem Anne van Keppel, 2nd Earl of Albemarle, a British nobleman |
| Alcona County | Michigan | A word invented by Henry Rowe Schoolcraft meaning the excellent plain with al from Arabic for the, co the root of a word for plain or prairie, and na for excellent |
| Alcorn County | Mississippi | James Lusk Alcorn, the twenty-eighth governor of Mississippi |
| Aleutians East Borough | Alaska | Eastern part of the Aleutian Islands (possibly from Chukchi aliat, "island") |
| Aleutians West Census Area | Alaska | Western part of the Aleutian Islands (possibly from Chukchi aliat, "island") |
| Alexander County | Illinois | William M. Alexander, a pioneer in the county |
| Alexander County | North Carolina | The Alexander family, of whom several members were leaders in colonial North Carolina |
| Alexandria | Virginia | John Alexander, the original owner of the land that the town is located on, and his family |
| Alfalfa County | Oklahoma | William Henry David "Alfalfa Bill" Murray, the ninth governor of Oklahoma |
| Alger County | Michigan | Russell Alexander Alger, the twentieth governor of Michigan |
| Allamakee County | Iowa | Either Allan Makee, a trapper and trader, or an uncertain Native American origin |
| Allegan County | Michigan | Probably a word invented by Henry Rowe Schoolcraft meaning the lake with al from Arabic for the and egan from sa-gi-e-gan, the Chippewa word for lake. Other meanings often given are fine river or fair river. |
| Allegany County | Maryland | From oolikhanna, a Lenape word meaning "beautiful stream". The word is the origin of the name of the Allegheny River. |
| Allegany County | New York | From oolikhanna, a Lenape word meaning "beautiful stream". The word is the origin of the name of the Allegheny River. |
| Alleghany County | North Carolina | From oolikhanna, a Lenape word meaning "beautiful stream". The word is the origin of the name of the Allegheny River. |
| Alleghany County | Virginia | The Allegheny Mountains |
| Allegheny County | Pennsylvania | From oolikhanna, a Lenape Native American word meaning beautiful stream. The word is the origin of the name of the Allegheny River. |
| Allen County | Indiana | John Allen, a lawyer, legislator, and lieutenant colonel killed in the Battle of River Raisin in the War of 1812 |
| Allen County | Kentucky | John Allen, a lawyer, legislator, and lieutenant colonel killed in the Battle of River Raisin in the War of 1812 |
| Allen County | Ohio | John Allen, a lawyer, legislator, and lieutenant colonel killed in the Battle of River Raisin in the War of 1812 |
| Allen County | Kansas | William Allen, a United States senator from Ohio |
| Allen Parish | Louisiana | Henry Watkins Allen, the nineteenth governor of Louisiana |
| Allendale County | South Carolina | The Allens family of the area, of which one member, Paul H. Allens, was the county seat's first postmaster |
| Alpena County | Michigan | A word invented by Henry Rowe Schoolcraft meaning the bird with al from Arabic for the and either pinai for partridge or penaissee for bird |
| Alpine County | California | Its location high in the Sierra Nevada mountains |
| Amador County | California | Jose Maria Amador, a soldier, rancher and miner, who in 1848 established a successful gold mining camp near the present town of Amador City, California. In Spanish, the word amador means one who loves. |
| Amelia County | Virginia | Princess Amelia of Great Britain, a daughter of George II |
| Amherst County | Virginia | Jeffrey Amherst, 1st Baron Amherst, a colonial governor of Virginia and general in the French and Indian War |
| Amite County | Mississippi | The Amite River, which is located in the county |
| Anchorage | Alaska | Named for the fact that Cook Inlet, which Anchorage is located on, once was a popular anchorage for ships |
| Anderson County | Kansas | Joseph C. Anderson, a Kansas territorial legislator |
| Anderson County | Kentucky | Richard Clough Anderson, Jr., a Kentucky legislator and congressman who was the first ambassador from the United States to Colombia |
| Anderson County | South Carolina | Robert Anderson, a soldier in the American Revolutionary War |
| Anderson County | Tennessee | Joseph Anderson, a U.S. senator from Tennessee |
| Anderson County | Texas | Kenneth Lewis Anderson, the last vice president of the Republic of Texas |
| Andrew County | Missouri | Andrew Jackson Davis, an important citizen in St. Louis and Savannah, Missouri |
| Andrew County | Texas | Richard Andrews, the first Texan soldier to die in the Texas Revolution |
| Androscoggin County | Maine | The Androscoggin Native American tribe |
| Angelina County | Texas | A Hainai Native American woman who assisted early Spanish missionaries and was named Angelina by them |
| Anne Arundel County | Maryland | Anne Arundell, the wife of Cecil Calvert, 2nd Baron Baltimore and daughter of Thomas Arundell, 1st Baron Arundell of Wardour |
| Anoka County | Minnesota | A Dakota word meaning on both sides |
| Anson County | North Carolina | George Anson, 1st Baron Anson, a British admiral assigned to defend North Carolina's shipping from pirates |
| Antelope County | Nebraska | The pronghorn antelope in the area |
| Antrim County | Michigan | County Antrim in Ireland |
| Apache County | Arizona | The Apache Native American tribe |
| Appanoose County | Iowa | Appanoose, a chief of the Sac and Fox Native American tribes who headed the peace party during the Black Hawk War |
| Appling County | Georgia | Daniel Appling, a soldier in the War of 1812 |
| Appomattox County | Virginia | The Appomattox River, in turn named for the Appamatucks Native American tribe |
| Aransas County | Texas | The Rio Nuestra Senora de Aranzazu, a Spanish outpost in early Texas |
| Arapahoe County | Colorado | The Arapaho Native American tribe |
| Archer County | Texas | Branch Tanner Archer, a commissioner for the Republic of Texas |
| Archuleta County | Colorado | Antonio D. Archuleta, a Colorado state senator and his father, José Manuel Archuleta |
| Arenac County | Michigan | A word invented by Henry Rowe Schoolcraft meaning sandy earth with arena from Latin for sandy and ac from a Native American language for earth |
| Arkansas County | Arkansas | The Arkansa Native American tribe |
| Arlington County | Virginia | The Arlington estate associated with the Washington, Custis, and Lee families. The estate, in turn, was named for the original Arlington estate in Northampton County, Virginia, established sometime before 1680, which was, in turn again, named for Henry Bennet, 1st Earl of Arlington. |
| Armstrong County | Pennsylvania | John Armstrong, a general in the American Revolutionary War and delegate to the Continental Congress from Pennsylvania |
| Armstrong County | Texas | Any one of several Texas pioneer families |
| Aroostook County | Maine | A Miꞌkmaq word meaning beautiful river |
| Arthur County | Nebraska | Chester A. Arthur, the twenty-first president of the United States |
| Ascension Parish | Louisiana | A colonial ecclesiastical district in the area |
| Ashe County | North Carolina | Samuel Ashe, the ninth governor of North Carolina |
| Ashland County | Ohio | Ashland, the farm and mansion of Henry Clay at Lexington, Kentucky |
| Ashland County | Wisconsin | Ashland, the farm and mansion of Henry Clay at Lexington, Kentucky |
| Ashley County | Arkansas | Chester Ashley, a U.S. Senator from Arkansas |
| Ashtabula County | Ohio | Either the Ashtabula River, or an Algonquian Native American word meaning variously fish, fish river, river of many fish, there are always enough moving, or half-way place |
| Asotin County | Washington | The Nez Percé Native American name for Eel Creek |
| Assumption Parish | Louisiana | A colonial ecclesiastical district in the area |
| Atascosa County | Texas | The Spanish word for boggy |
| Atchison County | Kansas | David Rice Atchison, a U.S. senator from Missouri |
| Atchison County | Missouri | David Rice Atchison, a U.S. senator from Missouri |
| Athens County | Ohio | Athens, Greece, as the county was the location of the state university |
| Atkinson County | Georgia | William Yates Atkinson, the fifty-eighth governor of Georgia |
| Atlantic County | New Jersey | The Atlantic Ocean, on the shores of which the county is located |
| Atoka County | Oklahoma | Its county seat of Atoka, named in turn for Atoka, a Choctaw leader |
| Attala County | Mississippi | Attala, a fictional Native American heroine |
| Audrain County | Missouri | James H. Audrain, a Missouri state legislator |
| Audubon County | Iowa | John James Audubon, the famous naturalist and painter |
| Auglaize County | Ohio | The Auglaize River, from French rivière à la Grande Glaize ("river of Great Clay") |
| Augusta County | Virginia | Augusta of Saxe-Gotha, the wife of Frederick, Prince of Wales and mother of King George III |
| Aurora County | South Dakota | Aurora, the Ancient Roman goddess of the dawn. |
| Austin County | Texas | Stephen Fuller Austin, the person who facilitated the Anglo American colonization of Texas and is known as the Father of Texas |
| Autauga County | Alabama | The Atauga village of Atagi ("pure water"), which was located at the confluence of Autauga Creek and the Alabama River |
| Avery County | North Carolina | Waightstill Avery, a Revolutionary War colonel and attorney general of the state of North Carolina |
| Avoyelles Parish | Louisiana | The Avoyel Native American tribe |

== B ==
| County name | State | Name origin |
|---|---|---|
| Baca County | Colorado | The prominent Baca family of Trinidad, Colorado, a member of which had settled early in the area |
| Bacon County | Georgia | Augustus Octavius Bacon, a U.S. senator from Georgia |
| Bailey County | Texas | Peter James Bailey, a defender of the Alamo |
| Baker County | Florida | James McNair Baker, a Confederate senator |
| Baker County | Georgia | Colonel John Baker, a hero of the American Revolutionary War |
| Baker County | Oregon | Edward Dickinson Baker, a U.S. Representative from Illinois, senator from Oregon, and close friend of Abraham Lincoln |
| Baldwin County | Alabama | Abraham Baldwin, a signer of the United States Constitution and U.S. congressman from Georgia |
| Baldwin County | Georgia | Abraham Baldwin, a signer of the United States Constitution and U.S. congressman from Georgia |
| Ballard County | Kentucky | Bland W. Ballard, a long time frontier spy and scout for George Rogers Clark and as a brevet major of the Kentucky Militia led the initial attack at the battle of River Raisin in the War of 1812. He suffered from a wound from the battle until his death in 1854. |
| City of Baltimore | Maryland | Cecil Calvert, 2nd Baron Baltimore, the founder of the Colony of Maryland. |
| Baltimore County | Maryland | The City of Baltimore, which was detached from Baltimore County in 1851 |
| Bamberg County | South Carolina | Either Francis Marion Bamberg, a soldier in the American Civil War; or William Seaborn Bamberg, a local resident along with other members of his family |
| Bandera County | Texas | Bandera Pass, named in turn for the Spanish word for flag |
| Banks County | Georgia | Richard Banks, a prominent physician |
| Banner County | Nebraska | The hope of the early settlers to make the county the "banner county" of the state |
| Bannock County | Idaho | The Bannock Native American tribe |
| Baraga County | Michigan | Frederic Baraga, a missionary who worked with local Native Americans |
| Barber County | Kansas | Thomas W. Barber, a free-stater killed in Douglas County during the "troubles" near Lawrence which came to be known as Bloody Kansas |
| Barbour County | Alabama | James Barbour, the nineteenth governor of Virginia |
| Barbour County | West Virginia | Philip P. Barbour, a Speaker of the United States House of Representatives from Virginia |
| Barnes County | North Dakota | Alanson Hamilton Barnes, a justice of the Dakota territorial supreme court |
| Barnstable County | Massachusetts | For its county seat of Barnstable, Massachusetts, which was named for the town of Barnstaple in Devon, England |
| Barnwell County | South Carolina | A Barnwell family |
| Barren County | Kentucky | Large treeless expanses found by early explorers caused by Native Americans burning tracts of forest |
| Barron County | Wisconsin | Henry D. Barron, a Wisconsin state legislator and judge |
| Barrow County | Georgia | David Crenshaw Barrow, an official of the University of Georgia |
| Barry County | Michigan | William Taylor Barry, a United States Postmaster General |
| Barry County | Missouri | William Taylor Barry, a United States Postmaster General |
| Bartholomew County | Indiana | Joseph Bartholomew, a hero of the Battle of Tippecanoe and U.S. senator. He was an Indiana state senator at the time of Bartholomew County's formation. |
| Barton County | Kansas | Clara Barton, the organizing founder of the American Red Cross |
| Barton County | Missouri | David Barton, a U.S. senator from Missouri |
| Bartow County | Georgia | Francis S. Bartow, a Civil War general killed at the First Battle of Bull Run |
| Bastrop County | Texas | Felipe Enrique Neri, Baron de Bastrop, an early Dutch settler in Texas |
| Bates County | Missouri | Frederick Bates, the second governor of Missouri |
| Bath County | Kentucky | Springs in the area thought to have medicinal value |
| Bath County | Virginia | Either for the many warm springs within its borders or the city of Bath in England |
| Baxter County | Arkansas | Elisha Baxter, the thirteenth governor of Arkansas |
| Bay County | Florida | St. Andrews Bay, which the county is located on |
| Bay County | Michigan | Saginaw Bay, which the county is located on |
| Bayfield County | Wisconsin | Henry Bayfield, a British naval officer who performed the first survey of the Great Lakes region |
| Baylor County | Texas | Henry Weidner Baylor, a surgeon in the Texas Rangers during the Mexican–American War |
| Beadle County | South Dakota | William Henry Harrison Beadle, a leading figure and surveyor-general of the Dakota Territory |
| Bear Lake County | Idaho | Bear Lake, which lies partly within the county and partly within Utah |
| Beaufort County | North Carolina | Henry Somerset, 2nd Duke of Beaufort, a Lord Proprietor of Carolina |
| Beaufort County | South Carolina | Henry Somerset, 2nd Duke of Beaufort, a Lord Proprietor of Carolina |
| Beauregard Parish | Louisiana | Pierre Gustave Toutant de Beauregard, the Civil War Confederate general |
| Beaver County | Oklahoma | Its county seat of Beaver, Oklahoma and the Beaver River, which flows through the county |
| Beaver County | Pennsylvania | The Beaver River of Pennsylvania |
| Beaver County | Utah | The area's many beavers |
| Beaverhead County | Montana | A rock in the Jefferson River shaped like a beaver's head |
| Becker County | Minnesota | George Loomis Becker, a Minnesota state legislator and mayor of St. Paul |
| Beckham County | Oklahoma | John Crepps Wickliffe Beckham, the thirty-fifth governor of Kentucky |
| City of Bedford | Virginia | John Russell, 4th Duke of Bedford, a Secretary of State for the Southern Department of Great Britain |
| Bedford County | Virginia | John Russell, 4th Duke of Bedford, a Secretary of State for the Southern Department of Great Britain |
| Bedford County | Pennsylvania | Fort Bedford, which was in turn named for the aforementioned 4th Duke of Bedford |
| Bedford County | Tennessee | Thomas Bedford, a soldier in the Revolutionary War |
| Bee County | Texas | Barnard Elliott Bee, Sr., a secretary of state of the Republic of Texas |
| Belknap County | New Hampshire | Jeremy Belknap, an early New Hampshire historian |
| Bell County | Kentucky | Joshua Fry Bell, a lawyer and Kentucky state legislator |
| Bell County | Texas | Peter Hansborough Bell, the third governor of Texas |
| Belmont County | Ohio | The French word for beautiful mountain or fine mountain, describing the scenery in the area |
| Beltrami County | Minnesota | Giacomo Costantino Beltrami, an Italian who explored the northern reaches of the Mississippi River |
| Ben Hill County | Georgia | Benjamin Harvey Hill, a Georgia state, Confederate, and U.S. congressman |
| Benewah County | Idaho | Benewah, a Coeur d'Alene leader |
| Bennett County | South Dakota | Either Granville G. Bennett, a prominent South Dakota politician; or John E. Bennett, a judge of the South Dakota Supreme Court |
| Bennington County | Vermont | The city of Bennington, Vermont, named in turn for Benning Wentworth, governor of the New Hampshire Grants in modern-day Vermont |
| Benson County | North Dakota | Bertil W. Benson, a North Dakota state senator |
| Bent County | Colorado | Bent's Fort which was located on the north bank of the Arkansas River, near present-day La Junta, and the Bent brothers who founded the fort |
| Benton County | Arkansas | Thomas Hart Benton, a U.S. senator from Missouri who pushed for westward expansion of the United States |
| Benton County | Indiana | Thomas Hart Benton, a U.S. senator from Missouri who pushed for westward expansion of the United States |
| Benton County | Iowa | Thomas Hart Benton, a U.S. senator from Missouri who pushed for westward expansion of the United States |
| Benton County | Minnesota | Thomas Hart Benton, a U.S. senator from Missouri who pushed for westward expansion of the United States |
| Benton County | Missouri | Thomas Hart Benton, a U.S. senator from Missouri who pushed for westward expansion of the United States |
| Benton County | Oregon | Thomas Hart Benton, a U.S. senator from Missouri who pushed for westward expansion of the United States |
| Benton County | Washington | Thomas Hart Benton, a U.S. senator from Missouri who pushed for westward expansion of the United States |
| Benton County | Mississippi | Confederate Brigadier General Samuel Benton from Holly Springs, Mississippi. Local lore has it that when the county was formed in 1870, locals suggested the name Benton to the Reconstruction legislature as being Thomas Hart Benton, a U.S. senator from Missouri who pushed for westward expansion of the United States, but the county was actually named for the Confederate general. |
| Benton County | Tennessee | Either David Benton, a soldier in the colonial Tennessee Militia; or Thomas Hart Benton, a U.S. senator from Missouri who pushed for westward expansion of the United States. |
| Benzie County | Michigan | An Anglicization of the French name, Riviere Aux-Bec-Scies ("river of sawbill bucks"), for the Betsie River |
| Bergen County | New Jersey | From the original New Netherland settlement of Bergen, which means hills |
| Berkeley County | South Carolina | John Berkeley and William Berkeley, two Lords Proprietor of Carolina |
| Berkeley County | West Virginia | Norborne Berkeley, 4th Baron Botetourt, a colonial governor of Virginia |
| Berks County | Pennsylvania | The English county of Berkshire |
| Berkshire County | Massachusetts | The English county of Berkshire |
| Bernalillo County | New Mexico | Either the nearby settlement of Bernalillo, New Mexico or the Gonzales-Bernal family |
| Berrien County | Georgia | John MacPherson Berrien, the tenth United States Attorney General |
| Berrien County | Michigan | John MacPherson Berrien, the tenth United States Attorney General |
| Bertie County | North Carolina | Either James Bertie or Henry Bertie, two Lords Proprietor of Carolina |
| Bethel Census Area | Alaska | The town of Bethel, Alaska which is located in the census area, named in turn for the Biblical Bethel ("House of God") |
| Bexar County | Texas | Presidio San Antonio de Béxar, the capital of Mexican Texas; Béjar is present-day San Antonio |
| Bibb County | Alabama | William Wyatt Bibb, the first governor of Alabama who was a native of Georgia |
| Bibb County | Georgia | William Wyatt Bibb, the first governor of Alabama who was a native of Georgia |
| Bienville Parish | Louisiana | Jean Baptiste Le Moyne Sieur de Bienville, a French colonial governor of Louisiana |
| Big Horn County | Montana | The bighorn sheep in the area |
| Big Horn County | Wyoming | The bighorn sheep in the area |
| Big Stone County | Minnesota | Big Stone Lake |
| Billings County | North Dakota | Frederick H. Billings, the president of the Northern Pacific Railroad when the county was formed |
| Bingham County | Idaho | Henry Harrison Bingham, a U.S. congressman from Pennsylvania |
| Black Hawk County | Iowa | Black Hawk, the Sac and Fox Native American chief who led a revolt against resettlement of his tribe in the Black Hawk War |
| Blackford County | Indiana | Isaac Newton Blackford, a speaker of the first Indiana General Assembly and judge on the Indiana Supreme Court |
| Bladen County | North Carolina | Martin Bladen, a British politician and Commissioner of Trade and Plantations |
| Blaine County | Idaho | James G. Blaine, the American statesman, secretary of state, U.S. senator, and presidential candidate |
| Blaine County | Montana | James G. Blaine, the American statesman, secretary of state, U.S. senator, and presidential candidate |
| Blaine County | Nebraska | James G. Blaine, the American statesman, secretary of state, U.S. senator, and presidential candidate |
| Blaine County | Oklahoma | James G. Blaine, the American statesman, secretary of state, U.S. senator, and presidential candidate |
| Blair County | Pennsylvania | John Blair Jr., a signer of the United States Constitution and Associate Justice of the Supreme Court of the United States from Pennsylvania |
| Blanco County | Texas | The Blanco River, from the Spanish word for "white" |
| Bland County | Virginia | Richard Bland, a colonial delegate to the Continental Congress from Virginia |
| Bleckley County | Georgia | Logan Edwin Bleckley, a soldier and judge on the South Carolina Supreme Court |
| Bledsoe County | Tennessee | Anthony Bledsoe, a soldier in the Revolutionary War and an early settler in the area |
| Blount County | Alabama | William Blount, the only governor of the Southwest Territory (modern-day Tennessee) |
| Blount County | Tennessee | William Blount, the only governor of the Southwest Territory (modern-day Tennessee) |
| Blue Earth County | Minnesota | The Blue Earth River, named in turn for blue-green earth found near its mouth and used by Dakota Native Americans as a pigment |
| Boise County | Idaho | The Boise River, from the French boisé, "wooded" |
| Bolivar County | Mississippi | Simón Bolívar, the great South American revolutionary and general |
| Bollinger County | Missouri | George Frederick Bollinger, a pioneer and Missouri state legislator |
| Bon Homme County | South Dakota | An unknown man whose grave was found on an island in the Missouri River located in the county. A wooden cross marked the grave simply "Bon Homme," the French words for "good man." |
| Bond County | Illinois | Shadrach Bond, the first governor of Illinois |
| Bonner County | Idaho | Edwin L. Bonner, a pioneer ferry operator in the area |
| Bonneville County | Idaho | Established in 1911 and named after Benjamin Bonneville (1796–1878), a French-born officer in the U.S. Army, fur trapper, and explorer in the American West. |
| Boone County | Arkansas | Daniel Boone, the famous frontiersman |
| Boone County | Illinois | Daniel Boone, the famous frontiersman |
| Boone County | Indiana | Daniel Boone, the famous frontiersman |
| Boone County | Kentucky | Daniel Boone, the famous frontiersman |
| Boone County | Missouri | Daniel Boone, the famous frontiersman |
| Boone County | Nebraska | Daniel Boone, the famous frontiersman |
| Boone County | West Virginia | Daniel Boone, the famous frontiersman |
| Boone County | Iowa | Daniel Boone, the famous frontiersman, and his son, Nathan Boone, a colonel in the U. S. Dragoons |
| Borden County | Texas | Gail Borden, Jr., a businessman, publisher, and surveyor in Texas who invented condensed milk |
| Bosque County | Texas | The Bosque River |
| Bossier Parish | Louisiana | Presumably for Pierre Bossier, a U.S. representative from Louisiana |
| Botetourt County | Virginia | Norborne Berkeley, 4th Baron Botetourt, a colonial governor of Virginia |
| Bottineau County | North Dakota | Pierre Bottineau, a Métis guide and frontiersman in the area |
| Boulder County | Colorado | The abundance of boulders in the area |
| Boundary County | Idaho | The fact that it borders Washington on the west, Montana on the east, and Canada (British Columbia) on the north |
| Bourbon County | Kansas | Bourbon County, Kentucky |
| Bourbon County | Kentucky | The French House of Bourbon |
| Bowie County | Texas | James Bowie, the legendary knife fighter who died at the Battle of the Alamo |
| Bowman County | North Dakota | Edward M. Bowman, a Dakota Territory territorial legislator |
| Box Butte County | Nebraska | A large box-shaped butte located in the county |
| Box Elder County | Utah | The area's many box elder trees |
| Boyd County | Kentucky | Linn Boyd, a U. S. congressman and Speaker of the U. S. House of Representatives from Kentucky |
| Boyd County | Nebraska | James E. Boyd, the eighth governor of Nebraska |
| Boyle County | Kentucky | John Boyle, a U. S. congressman and district judge from Kentucky |
| Bracken County | Kentucky | Bracken Creek and Little Bracken Creek, two streams located in the county |
| Bradford County | Florida | Richard Bradford, a soldier in the Civil War who was killed in the Battle of Santa Rosa Island |
| Bradford County | Pennsylvania | William Bradford, the second United States Attorney General |
| Bradley County | Arkansas | Hugh Bradley, a soldier in the War of 1812 |
| Bradley County | Tennessee | Edward Bradley, a Tennessee militia officer in the War of 1812 |
| Branch County | Michigan | John Branch, the eighth United States Secretary of the Navy |
| Brantley County | Georgia | Benjamin D. Brantley, a member of a prominent local family; or William Goodman Brantley, a Georgia state senator |
| Braxton County | West Virginia | Carter Braxton, a signer of the United States Declaration of Independence from Virginia |
| Brazoria County | Texas | The Brazos River |
| Brazos County | Texas | The Brazos River |
| Breathitt County | Kentucky | John Breathitt, the eleventh governor of Kentucky |
| Breckinridge County | Kentucky | John Breckinridge, the fifth United States Attorney General and a U. S. senator from Kentucky |
| Bremer County | Iowa | Fredricka Bremer, a Swedish novelist |
| Brevard County | Florida | Theodore Washington Brevard, a Florida State Controller in the 1850s; it was originally named St. Lucia County |
| Brewster County | Texas | Henry Percy Brewster, a secretary of war for the Republic of Texas and soldier in the American Civil War |
| Briscoe County | Texas | Andrew Briscoe, a soldier during the Texas Revolution |
| City of Bristol | Virginia | The city of Bristol, England |
| Bristol County | Massachusetts | The city of Bristol, England |
| Bristol County | Rhode Island | The city of Bristol, England |
| Bristol Bay Borough | Alaska | Bristol Bay, which is located in the borough and was named for Augustus Hervey, 3rd Earl of Bristol by Captain James Cook |
| Broadwater County | Montana | Charles A. Broadwater, a pioneer in the area and soldier in the United States Army |
| Bronx County | New York | Jonas Bronck, an early settler in the region |
| Brooke County | West Virginia | Robert Brooke, the tenth governor of Virginia |
| Brookings County | South Dakota | Wilmot W. Brookings, a pioneer who was one of the first settlers in the Dakota Territory |
| Brooks County | Georgia | Preston Smith Brooks, a U. S. congressman from South Carolina who famously attacked Charles Sumner, a fellow senator, with a cane |
| Brooks County | Texas | John Abijah Brooks, a Texas Ranger and Texas state legislator |
| Broome County | New York | John Broome, a lieutenant governor of New York |
| City and County of Broomfield | Colorado | The quantity of broom corn grown in the area. The city was incorporated in 1961, and obtained county status in 2001. |
| Broward County | Florida | Napoleon Bonaparte Broward, the nineteenth governor of Florida |
| Brown County | Illinois | Jacob Jennings Brown, a general in the War of 1812 |
| Brown County | Indiana | Jacob Jennings Brown, a general in the War of 1812 |
| Brown County | Ohio | Jacob Jennings Brown, a general in the War of 1812 |
| Brown County | Wisconsin | Jacob Jennings Brown, a general in the War of 1812 |
| Brown County | Kansas | Albert Gallatin Brown, the fourteenth governor of Mississippi and a U.S. senator from Mississippi |
| Brown County | Minnesota | Joseph Renshaw Brown, a prominent pioneer, newspaperman, and Minnesota territorial legislator |
| Brown County | Nebraska | Any two of five members of the Nebraska state legislature named Brown at the time of the county's formation |
| Brown County | South Dakota | Alfred Brown, a Dakota territorial legislator |
| Brown County | Texas | Henry Stevenson Brown, a commander at the Battle of Velasco prior to the Texas Revolution |
| Brule County | South Dakota | Probably the Brulé, a branch of the Sioux Native American tribe |
| Brunswick County | North Carolina | King George I, Duke of Brunswick-Lüneburg |
| Brunswick County | Virginia | The region of Brunswick in present-day Germany |
| Bryan County | Georgia | Jonathan Bryan, a Georgia colonial legislator in the 17th century |
| Bryan County | Oklahoma | William Jennings Bryan, the lawyer, forty-first United States Secretary of State, and thrice-time presidential candidate |
| Buchanan County | Iowa | James Buchanan, the fifteenth president of the United States |
| Buchanan County | Missouri | James Buchanan, the fifteenth president of the United States |
| Buchanan County | Virginia | James Buchanan, the fifteenth president of the United States |
| Buckingham County | Virginia | Either the English county of Buckinghamshire; or an unknown Duke of Buckingham (extinct at the time of the county's formation) |
| Bucks County | Pennsylvania | The English county of Buckinghamshire |
| City of Buena Vista | Virginia | The Buena Vista Company, which raised the money for the city's founding |
| Buena Vista County | Iowa | The Battle of Buena Vista in the Mexican–American War |
| Buffalo County | Nebraska | The American bison which once roamed the present county |
| Buffalo County | South Dakota | Probably the American bison |
| Buffalo County | Wisconsin | The Buffalo River |
| Bullitt County | Kentucky | Alexander Scott Bullitt, a co-author of the Kentucky state constitution and the first lieutenant governor of Kentucky |
| Bulloch County | Georgia | Archibald Bulloch, the second governor of Georgia |
| Bullock County | Alabama | Edward C. Bullock, a soldier in the Confederate States Army |
| Buncombe County | North Carolina | Edward Buncombe, a soldier in the Revolutionary War |
| Bureau County | Illinois | Pierre de Bureo, a French trader with Native American in the area |
| Burke County | Georgia | Edmund Burke, a member of the British Parliament who advised the repeal of the Stamp Act in the 1760s and reconciliation with the American colonies |
| Burke County | North Carolina | Thomas Burke, the third governor of North Carolina |
| Burke County | North Dakota | John Burke, the tenth governor of North Dakota |
| Burleigh County | North Dakota | Walter Atwood Burleigh, a U.S. representative from the Dakota Territory |
| Burleson County | Texas | Edward Burleson, a general and statesman of the Texas Revolution |
| Burlington County | New Jersey | A corruption of the name of Bridlington, England |
| Burnet County | Texas | David Gouverneur Burnet, the first president of the Republic of Texas |
| Burnett County | Wisconsin | Thomas P. Burnett, a Wisconsin state legislator |
| Burt County | Nebraska | Francis Burt, the first governor of the Nebraska Territory |
| Butler County | Alabama | William Butler, a soldier who fought in the Creek War |
| Butler County | Iowa | William Orlando Butler, a Kentucky statesman, U.S. representative, vice presidential candidate, and general in the Mexican–American War |
| Butler County | Missouri | William Orlando Butler, a Kentucky statesman, U.S. representative, vice presidential candidate, and general in the Mexican–American War |
| Butler County | Kansas | Andrew Pickens Butler, a U.S. senator from South Carolina |
| Butler County | Kentucky | Richard Butler, a general who was killed at the Battle of the Wabash |
| Butler County | Ohio | Richard Butler, a general who was killed at the Battle of the Wabash |
| Butler County | Pennsylvania | Richard Butler, a general who was killed at the Battle of the Wabash |
| Butler County | Nebraska | Either David Butler, the first governor of Nebraska; or William Orlando Butler, a Kentucky statesman, U.S. representative, vice presidential candidate, and general in the Mexican–American War who also declined an appointment to become the first governor of the Nebraska Territory |
| Butte County | California | Either the Marysville Buttes or Sutter Buttes |
| Butte County | Idaho | The buttes scattered throughout the county |
| Butte County | South Dakota | One or more unknown buttes. |
| Butts County | Georgia | Sam Butts, a soldier killed in the War of 1812 |

== C ==
| County name | State | Name origin |
|---|---|---|
| Cabarrus County | North Carolina | Stephen Cabarrus, a North Carolina state legislator |
| Cabell County | West Virginia | William H. Cabell, the fourteenth governor of Virginia |
| Cache County | Utah | The caches of furs collected in the area by Rocky Mountain Fur Company trappers |
| Caddo County | Oklahoma | The Caddo Native American tribe |
| Caddo Parish | Louisiana | The Caddo Native American tribe |
| Calaveras County | California | Calaveras, the Spanish word for skulls, reportedly for the bones of fighters left behind after a Native American war that were discovered by Captain Gabriel Moraga |
| Calcasieu Parish | Louisiana | Supposedly for Calcasieu, an Atakapas Native American leader, whose name is said to mean crying eagle |
| Caldwell County | Kentucky | John Caldwell, a U. S. senator and the second lieutenant governor of Kentucky |
| Caldwell County | Missouri | Either for John Caldwell, a Native American scout; John Caldwell, a U.S. senator and the second lieutenant governor of Kentucky; or Mathew Caldwell, a signer of the Texas Declaration of Independence and soldier during the Texas Revolution |
| Caldwell County | North Carolina | Joseph Caldwell, the first president of the University of North Carolina, who advocated public school and railroad systems in North Carolina |
| Caldwell County | Texas | Probably for Mathew Caldwell, a signer of the Texas Declaration of Independence and soldier during the Texas Revolution |
| Caldwell Parish | Louisiana | The locally prominent Caldwell family |
| Caledonia County | Vermont | The Latin name for Scotland |
| Calhoun County | Alabama | John C. Calhoun, the U.S. statesman, seventh vice president of the United States, Secretary of State, and U.S. senator from South Carolina |
| Calhoun County | Arkansas | John C. Calhoun, the U.S. statesman, seventh vice president of the United States, Secretary of State, and U.S. senator from South Carolina |
| Calhoun County | Florida | John C. Calhoun, the U.S. statesman, seventh vice president of the United States, Secretary of State, and U.S. senator from South Carolina |
| Calhoun County | Georgia | John C. Calhoun, the U.S. statesman, seventh vice president of the United States, Secretary of State, and U.S. senator from South Carolina |
| Calhoun County | Illinois | John C. Calhoun, the U.S. statesman, seventh vice president of the United States, Secretary of State, and U.S. senator from South Carolina |
| Calhoun County | Iowa | John C. Calhoun, the U.S. statesman, seventh vice president of the United States, Secretary of State, and U.S. senator from South Carolina |
| Calhoun County | Michigan | John C. Calhoun, the U.S. statesman, seventh vice president of the United States, Secretary of State, and U.S. senator from South Carolina |
| Calhoun County | Mississippi | John C. Calhoun, the U.S. statesman, seventh vice president of the United States, Secretary of State, and U.S. senator from South Carolina |
| Calhoun County | South Carolina | John C. Calhoun, the U.S. statesman, seventh vice president of the United States, Secretary of State, and U.S. senator from South Carolina |
| Calhoun County | Texas | John C. Calhoun, the U.S. statesman, seventh vice president of the United States, Secretary of State, and U.S. senator from South Carolina |
| Calhoun County | West Virginia | John C. Calhoun, the U.S. statesman, seventh vice president of the United States, Secretary of State, and U.S. senator from South Carolina |
| Callahan County | Texas | James Hughes Callahan, a soldier during the Texas Revolution |
| Callaway County | Missouri | James Callaway, a "Missouri ranger" killed by Native Americans during the War of 1812 |
| Calloway County | Kentucky | Richard Calloway, an early pioneer in Kentucky |
| Calumet County | Wisconsin | Calumet, the French word for a Menominee peace pipe |
| Calvert County | Maryland | The Calvert family, whose male members bore the title of Baron Baltimore and included the founders of the colony of Maryland |
| Camas County | Idaho | The local camassia plant |
| Cambria County | Pennsylvania | The county's original status as Cambria Township of Somerset County, Pennsylvania; Cambria is an ancient name for Wales |
| Camden County | Georgia | Charles Pratt, 1st Earl Camden, a member of the British Parliament who opposed the Stamp Act in the 1760s |
| Camden County | Missouri | Charles Pratt, 1st Earl Camden, a member of the British Parliament who opposed the Stamp Act in the 1760s |
| Camden County | New Jersey | Charles Pratt, 1st Earl Camden, a member of the British Parliament who opposed the Stamp Act in the 1760s |
| Camden County | North Carolina | Charles Pratt, 1st Earl Camden, a member of the British Parliament who opposed the Stamp Act in the 1760s |
| Cameron County | Pennsylvania | Simon Cameron, the twenty-sixth Secretary of War of the United States in the first year of the American Civil War and a U.S. senator from Pennsylvania |
| Cameron Parish | Louisiana | Simon Cameron, the twenty-sixth Secretary of War of the United States in the first year of the American Civil War and a U.S. senator from Pennsylvania |
| Cameron County | Texas | Ewen Cameron, a soldier during the Texas Revolution |
| Camp County | Texas | John Lafayette Camp, a Texas state politician |
| Campbell County | Kentucky | John Campbell, a soldier in the American Revolutionary War, founder of Louisville, and Kentucky state senator |
| Campbell County | South Dakota | Newton B. Campbell, territorial legislator |
| Campbell County | Tennessee | Arthur Campbell, a Virginia House of Burgesses representative |
| Campbell County | Virginia | William Campbell, a Continental Army general of the Revolutionary War |
| Campbell County | Wyoming | John Allen Campbell (1835–1880), first governor of the Wyoming Territory (1869–1875); or for John Archibald Campbell, a governor of the Wyoming Territory and associate justice of the United States Supreme Court; or Robert Campbell, an explorer of the area |
| Canadian County | Oklahoma | The Canadian River, which flows through the county |
| Candler County | Georgia | Allen Daniel Candler, the fifty-sixth governor of Georgia |
| Cannon County | Tennessee | Newton Cannon, the tenth governor of Tennessee |
| Canyon County | Idaho | Either the Boise River or Snake River canyon |
| Cape Girardeau County | Missouri | Supposedly for Sieur Jean Baptiste de Girardot, an early French colonial officer in the area |
| Cape May County | New Jersey | Cape May, a peninsula named for Cornelius Jacobsen Mey, the Dutch sea captain who discovered it |
| Carbon County | Montana | Coal deposits in the region |
| Carbon County | Pennsylvania | Coal deposits in the region |
| Carbon County | Utah | Coal deposits in the region |
| Carbon County | Wyoming | Coal deposits in the region |
| Caribou County | Idaho | The Caribou Range |
| Carlisle County | Kentucky | John Griffin Carlisle, a Speaker of the U. S. House of Representatives and U.S. Secretary of the Treasury from Kentucky |
| Carlton County | Minnesota | Reuben B. Carlton, a pioneer in the area |
| Caroline County | Maryland | Lady Caroline Eden, the daughter of Charles Calvert, 5th Baron Baltimore, sister of Frederick Calvert, 6th Baron Baltimore, and wife of Robert Eden, the last colonial governor of Maryland |
| Caroline County | Virginia | Caroline of Ansbach, the consort of King George II of Great Britain |
| Carroll County | Arkansas | Charles Carroll of Carrollton, the last surviving and only Catholic signer of the Declaration of Independence |
| Carroll County | Georgia | Charles Carroll of Carrollton, the last surviving and only Catholic signer of the Declaration of Independence |
| Carroll County | Illinois | Charles Carroll of Carrollton, the last surviving and only Catholic signer of the Declaration of Independence |
| Carroll County | Indiana | Charles Carroll of Carrollton, the last surviving and only Catholic signer of the Declaration of Independence |
| Carroll County | Iowa | Charles Carroll of Carrollton, the last surviving and only Catholic signer of the Declaration of Independence |
| Carroll County | Kentucky | Charles Carroll of Carrollton, the last surviving and only Catholic signer of the Declaration of Independence |
| Carroll County | Maryland | Charles Carroll of Carrollton, the last surviving and only Catholic signer of the Declaration of Independence |
| Carroll County | Mississippi | Charles Carroll of Carrollton, the last surviving and only Catholic signer of the Declaration of Independence |
| Carroll County | Missouri | Charles Carroll of Carrollton, the last surviving and only Catholic signer of the Declaration of Independence |
| Carroll County | New Hampshire | Charles Carroll of Carrollton, the last surviving and only Catholic signer of the Declaration of Independence |
| Carroll County | Ohio | Charles Carroll of Carrollton, the last surviving and only Catholic signer of the Declaration of Independence |
| Carroll County | Virginia | Charles Carroll of Carrollton, the last surviving and only Catholic signer of the Declaration of Independence |
| Carroll County | Tennessee | William Carroll, the sixth governor of Tennessee |
| Carson City | Nevada | Christopher Houston "Kit" Carson, the famous frontier scout and soldier |
| Carson County | Texas | Samuel Price Carson, the first secretary of state of the Republic of Texas |
| Carter County | Kentucky | William Grayson Carter, a Kentucky state senator |
| Carter County | Missouri | Zimri A. Carter, a pioneer in the area |
| Carter County | Montana | Thomas Henry Carter, a U.S. senator from Montana |
| Carter County | Oklahoma | Ben W. Carter, a captain in the United States Army and a Cherokee who married and settled among the Chickasaws, whose son was a state senator for over forty years following statehood |
| Carter County | Tennessee | Landon Carter, a speaker of the senate of the State of Franklin |
| Carteret County | North Carolina | John Carteret, 2nd Earl Granville (1690–1763), who inherited one-eighth share in the Province of Carolina through his great-grandfather George Carteret |
| Carver County | Minnesota | Jonathan Carver, an early explorer in the area |
| Cascade County | Montana | The Great Falls of the Missouri River, which were located in the county |
| Casey County | Kentucky | William Casey, an early pioneer in western Kentucky |
| Cass County | Illinois | Lewis Cass, Governor of Michigan and U.S. cabinet member |
| Cass County | Indiana | Lewis Cass, Governor of Michigan and U.S. cabinet member |
| Cass County | Iowa | Lewis Cass, Governor of Michigan and U.S. cabinet member |
| Cass County | Michigan | Lewis Cass, Governor of Michigan and U.S. cabinet member |
| Cass County | Minnesota | Lewis Cass, Governor of Michigan and U.S. cabinet member |
| Cass County | Missouri | Lewis Cass, Governor of Michigan and U.S. cabinet member |
| Cass County | Nebraska | Lewis Cass, Governor of Michigan and U.S. cabinet member |
| Cass County | Texas | Lewis Cass, Governor of Michigan and U.S. cabinet member |
| Cass County | North Dakota | George Washington Cass, president of the Northern Pacific Railroad |
| Cassia County | Idaho | Either for Cassia Creek or Mormon Battalion member James John Cazier |
| Castro County | Texas | Henri Castro, consul general to France for the Republic of Texas and founder of a colony in Texas |
| Caswell County | North Carolina | Richard Caswell (1729–1789), member of the first Continental Congress and first governor of North Carolina after the Declaration of Independence |
| Catahoula Parish | Louisiana | Catahoula Lake, formerly within the parish's boundaries (now within La Salle Parish) and named from a Tensas word meaning "big, clear lake" |
| Catawba County | North Carolina | The Native American Catawba Nation |
| Catoosa County | Georgia | Derived from the Cherokee "Gatusi," signifying a prominent hill or point on a mountain. |
| Catron County | New Mexico | Thomas B. Catron, advocate for statehood and first U.S. senator from New Mexico |
| Cattaraugus County | New York | A Seneca word meaning "bad smelling banks", referring to the odor of natural gas which leaked from local rock formations |
| Cavalier County | North Dakota | Charles Cavalier of Pembina, one of the area's earliest European-American settlers |
| Cayuga County | New York | The Cayuga nation of Native Americans |
| Cecil County | Maryland | Cecil Calvert, 2nd Baron Baltimore (1605–1675), founder of the Maryland colony |
| Cedar County | Iowa | The Cedar River, which runs through the county |
| Cedar County | Missouri | The abundance of juniper trees (known as Eastern Red Cedar) in the county |
| Cedar County | Nebraska | The abundance of juniper trees (known as Eastern Red Cedar) in the county |
| Centre County | Pennsylvania | Its geographical location in relation to the rest of the counties in the state |
| Cerro Gordo County | Iowa | The Battle of Cerro Gordo in the Mexican–American War |
| Chaffee County | Colorado | Jerome B. Chaffee, a pioneer and one of Colorado's first two U.S. senators |
| Chambers County | Alabama | Henry H. Chambers (1790–1826), U.S. senator |
| Chambers County | Texas | Thomas Jefferson Chambers, an early lawyer in Texas |
| Champaign County | Illinois | Named by John W. Vance of Vermilion County, Illinois in 1833, after Champaign County, Ohio, where Vance was originally from |
| Champaign County | Ohio | French for "a plain", describing the land in the area |
| Chariton County | Missouri | The Chariton River, whose naming origin is disputed |
| Charles City County | Virginia | King Charles I of England |
| Charles County | Maryland | Charles Calvert, 3rd Baron Baltimore |
| Charles Mix County | South Dakota | Charles Eli Mix, commissioner of Indian Affairs |
| Charleston County | South Carolina | King Charles II of England |
| Charlevoix County | Michigan | Pierre François Xavier de Charlevoix (1682–1761), Jesuit traveller and historian of New France |
| Charlotte County | Florida | Directly named for Charlotte Harbor, a bay of the Gulf of Mexico that borders on the county, which in turn was named for Charlotte, queen consort of King George III. The bay was originally named "Carlos" by the area's earlier Spanish explorers, from the native Calusa people and their leaders, known as Carlos to the Spanish.) |
| Charlotte County | Virginia | Charlotte, queen consort of King George III |
| City of Charlottesville | Virginia | Charlotte, queen consort of King George III |
| Charlton County | Georgia | Robert Milledge Charlton, a U.S. senator from Georgia |
| Chase County | Kansas | Salmon P. Chase, senator and governor from Ohio and Chief Justice of the United States |
| Chase County | Nebraska | Champion S. Chase, a mayor of Omaha who served as Nebraska's first attorney general |
| Chatham County | Georgia | William Pitt, 1st Earl of Chatham, one of England's most celebrated prime ministers |
| Chatham County | North Carolina | William Pitt, 1st Earl of Chatham, one of England's most celebrated prime ministers |
| Chattahoochee County | Georgia | The Chattahoochee River, which forms the county's western boundary, whose name probably comes from a Creek Indian word for "painted rock" |
| Chattooga County | Georgia | The Chattooga River, one of two Georgia rivers bearing that name |
| Chautauqua County | Kansas | Chautauqua County, New York |
| Chautauqua County | New York | A Seneca word meaning "where the fish was taken out" |
| Chaves County | New Mexico | José Francisco Chaves, a 19th-century New Mexico political and military figure |
| Cheatham County | Tennessee | Edward Cheatham, state legislator |
| Cheboygan County | Michigan | The Cheboygan River |
| Chelan County | Washington | A Native American word meaning "deep water", likely referring to Lake Chelan |
| Chemung County | New York | A Lenape word meaning "big horn", which was the name of a local Native American village |
| Chenango County | New York | An Onondaga word meaning "large bull-thistle" |
| Cherokee County | Alabama | The Cherokee Nation |
| Cherokee County | Iowa | The Cherokee Nation |
| Cherokee County | Kansas | The Cherokee Nation |
| Cherokee County | North Carolina | The Cherokee Nation |
| Cherokee County | Oklahoma | The Cherokee Nation |
| Cherokee County | South Carolina | The Cherokee Nation |
| Cherokee County | Texas | The Cherokee Nation |
| Cherry County | Nebraska | Samuel A. Cherry |
| City of Chesapeake | Virginia | The Chesapeake tribe of Native Americans |
| Cheshire County | New Hampshire | The English county of Cheshire |
| Chester County | Pennsylvania | The English city of Chester in the county of Cheshire |
| Chester County | South Carolina | Chester, Pennsylvania |
| Chester County | Tennessee | Tennessee state legislator Robert I. Chester |
| Chesterfield County | South Carolina | Philip Stanhope, 4th Earl of Chesterfield |
| Chesterfield County | Virginia | Philip Stanhope, 4th Earl of Chesterfield |
| Cheyenne County | Colorado | The Cheyenne Native American people |
| Cheyenne County | Kansas | The Cheyenne Native American people |
| Cheyenne County | Nebraska | The Cheyenne Native American people |
| Chickasaw County | Iowa | The Chickasaw Native American people |
| Chickasaw County | Mississippi | The Chickasaw Native American people |
| Chicot County | Arkansas | Point Chicot on the Mississippi River |
| Childress County | Texas | George Childress (1804–1841), one of the authors of the Texas Declaration of Independence |
| Chilton County | Alabama | William Parish Chilton (1810–1871), Alabama Supreme Court Justice and Confederate congressman |
| Chippewa County | Michigan | The Ojibwe Native American people, also known as the Chippewa |
| Chippewa County | Wisconsin | The Ojibwe Native American people, also known as the Chippewa |
| Chippewa County | Minnesota | The Chippewa River |
| Chisago County | Minnesota | Chisago Lake |
| Chittenden County | Vermont | Thomas Chittenden, Vermont's first governor |
| Choctaw County | Alabama | The Choctaw Nation of Native Americans |
| Choctaw County | Mississippi | The Choctaw Nation of Native Americans |
| Choctaw County | Oklahoma | The Choctaw Nation of Native Americans |
| Chouteau County | Montana | Jean Pierre Chouteau and his son Pierre Chouteau, Jr., members of the Chouteau fur-trading family |
| Chowan County | North Carolina | The Chowan Native American tribe |
| Christian County | Illinois | Christian County, Kentucky |
| Christian County | Kentucky | William Christian, a Kentucky soldier of the Revolutionary War |
| Christian County | Missouri | William Christian, a Kentucky soldier of the Revolutionary War |
| Chugach Census Area | Alaska | The Chugach people |
| Churchill County | Nevada | Fort Churchill, named in turn for Sylvester Churchill (1783–1862), a general in the Mexican–American War |
| Cibola County | New Mexico | The Seven Cities of Cibola |
| Cimarron County | Oklahoma | The Cimarron River, from the early Spanish name, Río de los Carneros Cimarrón, which is usually translated as "River of the Wild Sheep" |
| Citrus County | Florida | The county's citrus trees |
| Clackamas County | Oregon | The Clackamas tribe of Native Americans living in the area |
| Claiborne County | Mississippi | William C. C. Claiborne (1775–1817), Governor of Louisiana and Governor of Mississippi Territory |
| Claiborne County | Tennessee | William C. C. Claiborne (1775–1817), Governor of Louisiana and Governor of Mississippi Territory |
| Claiborne Parish | Louisiana | William C. C. Claiborne (1775–1817), Governor of Louisiana and Governor of Mississippi Territory |
| Clallam County | Washington | From Klallam, meaning "the strong people" |
| Clare County | Michigan | County Clare, Ireland |
| Clarendon County | South Carolina | Edward Hyde, 1st Earl of Clarendon |
| Clarion County | Pennsylvania | The Clarion River, which was named by surveyor Daniel Stanard in 1817, who said "The ripple of the river sounds like a distant clarion." |
| Clark County | Arkansas | William Clark, co-leader of the Lewis and Clark Expedition |
| Clark County | Missouri | William Clark, co-leader of the Lewis and Clark Expedition |
| Clark County | Washington | William Clark, co-leader of the Lewis and Clark Expedition |
| Clark County | Idaho | Sam K. Clark, an Idaho state senator and early settler in the area |
| Clark County | Illinois | George Rogers Clark, the hero of the western front of the Revolutionary War, and older brother of William Clark |
| Clark County | Indiana | George Rogers Clark, the hero of the western front of the Revolutionary War, and older brother of William Clark |
| Clark County | Kentucky | George Rogers Clark, the hero of the western front of the Revolutionary War, and older brother of William Clark |
| Clark County | Ohio | George Rogers Clark, the hero of the western front of the Revolutionary War, and older brother of William Clark |
| Clark County | Kansas | Charles F. Clark |
| Clark County | Nevada | William A. Clark (1839–1925), a Montana copper magnate and United States senator who was largely responsible for the building of the Los Angeles and Salt Lake Railroad through the area |
| Clark County | South Dakota | Newton Clark, territorial legislator |
| Clark County | Wisconsin | Either George Rogers Clark (1752–1812), Revolutionary War general, or A.W. Clark, founder of Clark's Mill |
| Clarke County | Alabama | John Clarke (1766–1832), general from Georgia |
| Clarke County | Georgia | Revolutionary War hero Elijah Clarke |
| Clarke County | Iowa | James Clarke, third governor of the Iowa Territory |
| Clarke County | Mississippi | Joshua G. Clark |
| Clarke County | Virginia | George Rogers Clark, the hero of the western front of the American Revolutionary War, and older brother of William Clark |
| Clatsop County | Oregon | The Clatsop people, who lived along the coast of the Pacific Ocean prior to European settlement |
| Clay County | Alabama | Henry Clay (1777–1852), U.S. legislator from Kentucky |
| Clay County | Florida | Henry Clay (1777–1852), U.S. legislator from Kentucky |
| Clay County | Georgia | Henry Clay (1777–1852), U.S. legislator from Kentucky |
| Clay County | Illinois | Henry Clay (1777–1852), U.S. legislator from Kentucky |
| Clay County | Indiana | Henry Clay (1777–1852), U.S. legislator from Kentucky |
| Clay County | Kansas | Henry Clay (1777–1852), U.S. legislator from Kentucky |
| Clay County | Minnesota | Henry Clay (1777–1852), U.S. legislator from Kentucky |
| Clay County | Mississippi | Henry Clay (1777–1852), U.S. legislator from Kentucky |
| Clay County | Missouri | Henry Clay (1777–1852), U.S. legislator from Kentucky |
| Clay County | Nebraska | Henry Clay (1777–1852), U.S. legislator from Kentucky |
| Clay County | North Carolina | Henry Clay (1777–1852), U.S. legislator from Kentucky |
| Clay County | South Dakota | Henry Clay (1777–1852), U.S. legislator from Kentucky |
| Clay County | Tennessee | Henry Clay (1777–1852), U.S. legislator from Kentucky |
| Clay County | Texas | Henry Clay (1777–1852), U.S. legislator from Kentucky |
| Clay County | West Virginia | Henry Clay (1777–1852), U.S. legislator from Kentucky |
| Clay County | Arkansas | John M. Clayton, a state senator |
| Clay County | Iowa | Henry Clay, Jr. (1807–1847), officer in the Mexican–American War |
| Clay County | Kentucky | Green Clay (1757–1826), a Kentucky politician and cousin of Henry Clay who fought in the Revolutionary War and War of 1812 |
| Clayton County | Georgia | Judge Augustin Smith Clayton, who held the county's first sessions of the superior court and later served in both the Georgia House of Representatives and Senate |
| Clayton County | Iowa | John M. Clayton (1796–1856), United States senator from Delaware |
| Clear Creek County | Colorado | Clear Creek, which runs through the county |
| Clearfield County | Pennsylvania | The cleared fields from logging in the area |
| Clearwater County | Idaho | The Clearwater River |
| Clearwater County | Minnesota | The Clearwater River and Clearwater Lake, both within the county |
| Cleburne County | Alabama | Patrick Cleburne (1828–1864), major general in the Confederate States Army |
| Cleburne County | Arkansas | Patrick Cleburne (1828–1864), major general in the Confederate States Army |
| Clermont County | Ohio | Unknown. Clermont is French for "clear mountain" |
| Cleveland County | Arkansas | Grover Cleveland (1837–1908), 22nd and 24th President of the United States |
| Cleveland County | Oklahoma | Grover Cleveland (1837–1908), 22nd and 24th President of the United States |
| Cleveland County | North Carolina | Benjamin Cleveland (1738–1806), a colonel in the Revolutionary War who took part in the Battle of Kings Mountain |
| Clinch County | Georgia | General Duncan Lamont Clinch, who served in the War of 1812, defeated the Seminole leader Osceola in Florida, and later served in the U.S. Congress |
| Clinton County | Illinois | DeWitt Clinton (1769–1828), Governor of New York, responsible for the construction of the Erie Canal |
| Clinton County | Indiana | DeWitt Clinton (1769–1828), Governor of New York, responsible for the construction of the Erie Canal |
| Clinton County | Iowa | DeWitt Clinton (1769–1828), Governor of New York, responsible for the construction of the Erie Canal |
| Clinton County | Kentucky | DeWitt Clinton (1769–1828), Governor of New York, responsible for the construction of the Erie Canal |
| Clinton County | Michigan | DeWitt Clinton (1769–1828), Governor of New York, responsible for the construction of the Erie Canal |
| Clinton County | Pennsylvania | DeWitt Clinton (1769–1828), Governor of New York, responsible for the construction of the Erie Canal |
| Clinton County | Missouri | George Clinton, fourth Vice President of the United States and first and third Governor of New York |
| Clinton County | New York | George Clinton, fourth Vice President of the United States and first and third Governor of New York |
| Clinton County | Ohio | George Clinton, fourth Vice President of the United States and first and third Governor of New York |
| Cloud County | Kansas | William F. Cloud, Union Army officer |
| Coahoma County | Mississippi | A Choctaw word meaning "red panther" |
| Coal County | Oklahoma | Coal, the primary economic product of the region at the time |
| Cobb County | Georgia | Thomas Willis Cobb, a US representative and senator |
| Cochise County | Arizona | Cochise, the Apache leader |
| Cochran County | Texas | Robert E. Cochran (1810–1836), a defender of the Alamo |
| Cocke County | Tennessee | William Cocke (1747–1828), one of Tennessee's first U.S. senators |
| Coconino County | Arizona | The Coconino Native American people, a Hopi designation for the Havasupai and Yavapai people |
| Codington County | South Dakota | The Reverend G. S. Codington |
| Coffee County | Alabama | John Coffee (1772–1833), frontiersman, planter, and veteran of the Creek War and War of 1812 |
| Coffee County | Georgia | John Coffee (1772–1833), frontiersman, planter, and veteran of the Creek War and War of 1812 |
| Coffee County | Tennessee | John Coffee (1772–1833), frontiersman, planter, and veteran of the Creek War and War of 1812 |
| Coffey County | Kansas | A. M. Coffey |
| Coke County | Texas | Richard Coke, the fifteenth governor of Texas (1874–1876) |
| Colbert County | Alabama | George Colbert (?–1839) and Levi Colbert (?–1834), Chickasaw chiefs |
| Cole County | Missouri | Stephen Cole, pioneer |
| Coleman County | Texas | Robert M. Coleman, a signer of the Texas Declaration of Independence and soldier at the Battle of San Jacinto |
| Coles County | Illinois | Edward Coles (1786–1868), second Governor of Illinois |
| Colfax County | Nebraska | Schuyler Colfax, 17th Vice President of the United States |
| Colfax County | New Mexico | Schuyler Colfax, 17th Vice President of the United States |
| Colleton County | South Carolina | Sir John Colleton, 1st Baronet |
| Collier County | Florida | Barron Collier (1873–1939), an advertising entrepreneur who developed much of the land in southern Florida |
| Collin County | Texas | Collin McKinney (1766–1861), an author of the Texas Declaration of Independence |
| Collingsworth County | Texas | James Collinsworth, a signer of the Texas Declaration of Independence and first chief justice of the Republic of Texas |
| City of Colonial Heights | Virginia | From the Coloniels, French troops under the command of Gilbert du Motier, marquis de Lafayette, who occupied the site in 1781 during the Revolutionary War |
| Colorado County | Texas | The Colorado River of Texas (Colorado is Spanish for "red") |
| Colquitt County | Georgia | U.S. Senator Walter T. Colquitt |
| Columbia County | Arkansas | Columbia, a female personification of the United States, derived from Christopher Columbus |
| Columbia County | Florida | Columbia, a female personification of the United States, derived from Christopher Columbus |
| Columbia County | Georgia | Columbia, a female personification of the United States, derived from Christopher Columbus |
| Columbia County | New York | Columbia, a female personification of the United States, derived from Christopher Columbus |
| Columbia County | Pennsylvania | Columbia, a female personification of the United States, derived from Christopher Columbus |
| Columbia County | Wisconsin | Columbia, a female personification of the United States, derived from Christopher Columbus |
| Columbia County | Oregon | The Columbia River, itself named after the ship Columbia Rediviva of Captain Robert Gray, first American explorer to enter the river |
| Columbia County | Washington | The Columbia River, itself named after the ship Columbia Rediviva of Captain Robert Gray, first American explorer to enter the river |
| Columbiana County | Ohio | Christopher Columbus |
| Columbus County | North Carolina | Christopher Columbus |
| Colusa County | California | Two Mexican land grants; Coluses (1844) and Colus (1845) |
| Comal County | Texas | The Comal River (Comal is Spanish for "basin") |
| Comanche County | Kansas | The Comanche Native Americans, from the Spanish Camino Ancho, meaning "broad trail" |
| Comanche County | Oklahoma | The Comanche Native Americans, from the Spanish Camino Ancho, meaning "broad trail" |
| Comanche County | Texas | The Comanche Native Americans, from the Spanish Camino Ancho, meaning "broad trail" |
| Concho County | Texas | The Concho River (concho is Spanish for "shell") |
| Concordia Parish | Louisiana | From an early land grant called New Concordia; or from the "concord" reached by local authorities over a mutual surrender of slaves; or for a mansion called Concord which was owned by Governor de Lemos |
| Conecuh County | Alabama | The Conecuh River, which flows through the county. Derived from Muscogee koha anaka ("near the canebrake") or kono ekv ("skunk head") |
| Conejos County | Colorado | The Spanish word for "rabbits"; the swift-moving Conejos River also runs through the county |
| Contra Costa County | California | The Spanish phrase for "opposite coast", referring to its position across San Francisco Bay from the city of San Francisco |
| Converse County | Wyoming | A. R. Converse, a banker and rancher from Cheyenne |
| Conway County | Arkansas | Henry Wharton Conway (1793–1827), territorial delegate to the United States House of Representatives |
| Cook County | Georgia | General Philip Cook, who fought in the Seminole Wars and the Civil War and was Georgia's Secretary of State for over 20 years |
| Cook County | Illinois | The early Illinois statesman Daniel Pope Cook |
| Cook County | Minnesota | Major Michael Cook of Faribault: Civil War veteran and territorial and state senator, 1857–62 |
| Cooke County | Texas | William Gordon Cooke, a soldier during the Texas Revolution |
| Cooper County | Missouri | Sarshel Benjamin Cooper, pioneer settler |
| Coös County | New Hampshire | Native American word meaning "crooked", in reference to a bend in the Connecticut River |
| Coos County | Oregon | The Coos tribe of Native Americans who lived in the region |
| Coosa County | Alabama | The Coosa River, which flows through the county, after a Native American village |
| Copiah County | Mississippi | Choctaw coi apahyah, "calling panther" |
| Copper River Census Area | Alaska | The Copper River |
| Corson County | South Dakota | Dighton Corson, a Justice of the South Dakota Supreme Court |
| Cortland County | New York | Pierre Van Cortlandt, first Lieutenant Governor of New York |
| Coryell County | Texas | James Coryell, a frontiersman who was killed by Native Americans |
| Coshocton County | Ohio | A Lenape village, the name of which means "union of waters" |
| Costilla County | Colorado | The settlement of Costilla, New Mexico (at the time the county was named (1861), the settlement was in Colorado- an 1868 boundary revision placed it in New Mexico). Costilla is a Spanish word meaning either "little rib" or "furring timber". |
| Cottle County | Texas | George Washington Cottle, who died defending the Alamo |
| Cotton County | Oklahoma | Cotton, the principal economic base of the county |
| Cottonwood County | Minnesota | The Cottonwood River, named for the cottonwood trees along its shores |
| City of Covington | Virginia | Leonard Covington (1768–1813), brigadier general in the War of 1812 and U.S. congressman |
| Covington County | Alabama | Leonard Covington (1768–1813), brigadier general in the War of 1812 and U.S. congressman |
| Covington County | Mississippi | Leonard Covington (1768–1813), brigadier general in the War of 1812 and U.S. congressman |
| Coweta County | Georgia | The Coweta Indians, a Creek tribe headed by William McIntosh, Jr., the half-Scot, half-Creek who relinquished lands to the federal government in the 1825 Treaty of Indian Springs |
| Cowley County | Kansas | Matthew Cowley, Union Army lieutenant |
| Cowlitz County | Washington | The Cowlitz tribe of Native Americans |
| Craig County | Oklahoma | Granville Craig, a prominent Cherokee |
| Craig County | Virginia | Robert Craig (1792–1892), U.S. Representative from Virginia |
| Craighead County | Arkansas | Thomas Craighead (1798–1862), a state senator who actually opposed the creation of the county |
| Crane County | Texas | William Carey Crane, a president of Baylor University |
| Craven County | North Carolina | William, Earl of Craven, who was a Lord Proprietor of colonial North Carolina |
| Crawford County | Arkansas | William H. Crawford, U.S. Treasury Secretary |
| Crawford County | Georgia | William H. Crawford, U.S. Treasury Secretary |
| Crawford County | Illinois | William H. Crawford, U.S. Treasury Secretary |
| Crawford County | Iowa | William H. Crawford, U.S. Treasury Secretary |
| Crawford County | Missouri | William H. Crawford, U.S. Treasury Secretary |
| Crawford County | Wisconsin | William H. Crawford, U.S. Treasury Secretary |
| Crawford County | Indiana | Either U.S. Treasury Secretary William H. Crawford or Revolutionary War soldier William Crawford |
| Crawford County | Kansas | Samuel J. Crawford, third Governor of Kansas |
| Crawford County | Michigan | William Crawford, Revolutionary War soldier |
| Crawford County | Ohio | William Crawford, Revolutionary War soldier |
| Crawford County | Pennsylvania | William Crawford, Revolutionary War soldier |
| Creek County | Oklahoma | The Muscogee (Creek) people |
| Crenshaw County | Alabama | Anderson Crenshaw (1783–1847), settler of Butler County, Alabama |
| Crisp County | Georgia | Charles Frederick Crisp, a jurist and Speaker of the U.S. House of Representatives |
| Crittenden County | Arkansas | Robert Crittenden (1797–1834), Governor of the Arkansas Territory |
| Crittenden County | Kentucky | John J. Crittenden, Governor of Kentucky (1848–1850) |
| Crockett County | Tennessee | Davy Crockett (1786–1836), frontier humorist, congressman, and defender of the Alamo |
| Crockett County | Texas | Davy Crockett (1786–1836), frontier humorist, congressman, and defender of the Alamo |
| Crook County | Oregon | General George Crook (1828–1980), a U.S. Army officer who served in the American Civil War and various Indian Wars |
| Crook County | Wyoming | General George Crook (1828–1980), a U.S. Army officer who served in the American Civil War and various Indian Wars |
| Crosby County | Texas | Stephen Crosby, a land commissioner |
| Cross County | Arkansas | David C. Cross, a Confederate soldier in the Civil War and local politician |
| Crow Wing County | Minnesota | The Crow Wing River, itself named for an island at the river's mouth in the shape of a crow's wing |
| Crowley County | Colorado | John H. Crowley, state senator |
| Culberson County | Texas | David Browning Culberson, a lawyer and soldier in the Civil War |
| Cullman County | Alabama | Colonel John G. Cullmann (1823–1895), founder of the county seat |
| Culpeper County | Virginia | Thomas Colepeper, 2nd Baron Colepeper, colonial governor of Virginia, 1677–1683 |
| Cumberland County | Illinois | The Cumberland Road, or Cumberland, Maryland, or the Cumberland River in Kentucky |
| Cumberland County | Kentucky | The Cumberland River |
| Cumberland County | Maine | Prince William, Duke of Cumberland, youngest son of King George II |
| Cumberland County | New Jersey | Prince William, Duke of Cumberland, youngest son of King George II |
| Cumberland County | North Carolina | Prince William, Duke of Cumberland, youngest son of King George II |
| Cumberland County | Virginia | Prince William, Duke of Cumberland, youngest son of King George II |
| Cumberland County | Pennsylvania | The historical county of Cumberland, England |
| Cumberland County | Tennessee | The Cumberland Mountains |
| Cuming County | Nebraska | Thomas B. Cuming, an early governor of the territory |
| Currituck County | North Carolina | Algonquin term meaning "Land of the Wild Goose", also spelled coratank |
| Curry County | New Mexico | George Curry, a governor of New Mexico Territory from 1907 to 1910 |
| Curry County | Oregon | George Law Curry (1820–1878), a governor of the Oregon Territory |
| Custer County | Colorado | General George Armstrong Custer, who died at the Battle of the Little Bighorn |
| Custer County | Montana | General George Armstrong Custer, who died at the Battle of the Little Bighorn |
| Custer County | Nebraska | General George Armstrong Custer, who died at the Battle of the Little Bighorn |
| Custer County | Oklahoma | General George Armstrong Custer, who died at the Battle of the Little Bighorn |
| Custer County | South Dakota | General George Armstrong Custer, who died at the Battle of the Little Bighorn |
| Custer County | Idaho | The General Custer Mine, in turn named for General George Armstrong Custer |
| Cuyahoga County | Ohio | The Cuyahoga River, which means "crooked river" in an Iroquoian language |

== D ==
| County name | State | Name origin |
|---|---|---|
| Dade County | Florida | Former name of Miami-Dade County, Florida, from Major Francis L. Dade, who was killed in 1835 during the Second Seminole War |
| Dade County | Georgia | Major Francis L. Dade, who was killed in 1835 during the Second Seminole War |
| Dade County | Missouri | Major Francis L. Dade, who was killed in 1835 during the Second Seminole War |
| Daggett County | Utah | Ellsworth Daggett (1810–1880), the first Utah Surveyor General |
| Dakota County | Minnesota | Dakota language word meaning "Allies", after the Dakota branch of the Sioux Native American tribe |
| Dakota County | Nebraska | Dakota language word meaning "Allies", after the Dakota branch of the Sioux Native American tribe |
| Dale County | Alabama | Samuel Dale (1772–1841), brigadier general and state legislator |
| Dallam County | Texas | James Wilmer Dallam, a lawyer and newspaper publisher |
| Dallas County | Alabama | Alexander James Dallas (1759–1817), U.S. Secretary of the Treasury |
| Dallas County | Arkansas | George Mifflin Dallas, eleventh vice president of the United States |
| Dallas County | Iowa | George Mifflin Dallas, eleventh vice president of the United States |
| Dallas County | Missouri | George Mifflin Dallas, eleventh vice president of the United States |
| Dallas County | Texas | George Mifflin Dallas, eleventh vice president of the United States |
| Dane County | Wisconsin | Nathan Dane (1752–1835), delegate to the First Continental Congress, 1785–1788 |
| Daniels County | Montana | Mansfield A. Daniels, an early rancher and storekeeper |
| City of Danville | Virginia | The Dan River, which flows through the city |
| Dare County | North Carolina | Virginia Dare (b. 1587), the first child born of English parents in America |
| Darke County | Ohio | General William Darke (1736–1801), Revolutionary War officer |
| Darlington County | South Carolina | The town of Darlington in England |
| Dauphin County | Pennsylvania | Louis Joseph, Dauphin of France, the first son of Louis XVI |
| Davidson County | North Carolina | William Lee Davidson (1746–1781), a Revolutionary War brigadier general who died at the Battle of Cowan's Ford |
| Davidson County | Tennessee | William Lee Davidson (1746–1781), a Revolutionary War brigadier general who died at the Battle of Cowan's Ford |
| Davie County | North Carolina | Revolutionary War cavalry leader and North Carolina statesman William Richardson Davie |
| Daviess County | Indiana | Military man Joseph Hamilton Daveiss (1774–1811), killed at the Battle of Tippecanoe |
| Daviess County | Kentucky | Military man Joseph Hamilton Daveiss (1774–1811), killed at the Battle of Tippecanoe |
| Daviess County | Missouri | Military man Joseph Hamilton Daveiss (1774–1811), killed at the Battle of Tippecanoe |
| Davis County | Iowa | Garrett Davis (1801–1872), congressman |
| Davis County | Utah | Daniel C. Davis (1804–1850), Mormon Battalion captain |
| Davison County | South Dakota | Henry C. Davison, early resident of county |
| Dawes County | Nebraska | James W. Dawes, the sixth governor of Nebraska |
| Dawson County | Georgia | Jurist and politician William Crosby Dawson |
| Dawson County | Montana | Andrew Dawson, a trapping official and major in the United States Army |
| Dawson County | Nebraska | Jacob Dawson, the first postmaster in the settlement of Lancaster (present-day Lincoln, the state capital) |
| Dawson County | Texas | Nicholas Mosby Dawson, a soldier of the Texas Revolution and victim of the Dawson Massacre |
| Day County | South Dakota | Merritt H. Day, territorial legislator |
| De Baca County | New Mexico | Ezequiel Cabeza De Baca, the second governor of New Mexico |
| De Soto Parish | Louisiana | Hernando de Soto, a Spanish explorer and conquistador |
| Deaf Smith County | Texas | Erastus Deaf Smith (1787–1837), a scout during the Texas Revolution |
| Dearborn County | Indiana | U.S. Secretary of War Henry Dearborn |
| Decatur County | Georgia | Commodore Stephen Decatur, a naval leader in the War of 1812 and who defeated the Barbary Coast pirates at Tripoli in 1815 |
| Decatur County | Indiana | Commodore Stephen Decatur, a naval leader in the War of 1812 and who defeated the Barbary Coast pirates at Tripoli in 1815 |
| Decatur County | Iowa | Commodore Stephen Decatur, a naval leader in the War of 1812 and who defeated the Barbary Coast pirates at Tripoli in 1815 |
| Decatur County | Kansas | Commodore Stephen Decatur, a naval leader in the War of 1812 and who defeated the Barbary Coast pirates at Tripoli in 1815 |
| Decatur County | Tennessee | Commodore Stephen Decatur, a naval leader in the War of 1812 and who defeated the Barbary Coast pirates at Tripoli in 1815 |
| Deer Lodge County | Montana | Deer Lodge Valley, which in turn was either named for the Native American name "Lodge of the White-tailed Deer" or a salt lick where deer came in droves |
| Defiance County | Ohio | The city of Defiance, Ohio, which was built on the site of Fort Defiance, built by General "Mad" Anthony Wayne in the late 18th century |
| DeKalb County | Alabama | Baron Johann de Kalb (1721–1780), a German soldier who fought on the side of the Americans in the Revolutionary War |
| DeKalb County | Georgia | Baron Johann de Kalb (1721–1780), a German soldier who fought on the side of the Americans in the Revolutionary War |
| DeKalb County | Illinois | Baron Johann de Kalb (1721–1780), a German soldier who fought on the side of the Americans in the Revolutionary War |
| DeKalb County | Indiana | Baron Johann de Kalb (1721–1780), a German soldier who fought on the side of the Americans in the Revolutionary War |
| DeKalb County | Missouri | Baron Johann de Kalb (1721–1780), a German soldier who fought on the side of the Americans in the Revolutionary War |
| DeKalb County | Tennessee | Baron Johann de Kalb (1721–1780), a German soldier who fought on the side of the Americans in the Revolutionary War |
| Del Norte County | California | From the Spanish word for "northern", because Del Norte County is the northwesternmost county in the state |
| Delaware County | Indiana | The Lenape (or "Delaware") Native American people |
| Delaware County | Ohio | The Lenape (or "Delaware") Native American people |
| Delaware County | Iowa | The state of Delaware, or for Delaware County, New York |
| Delaware County | New York | Thomas West, 3rd Baron De La Warr (1577–1618), an early colonial leader in Virginia |
| Delaware County | Oklahoma | The Delaware District of the old Cherokee Nation |
| Delaware County | Pennsylvania | The Delaware River, in turn named for Thomas West, 3rd Baron De La Warr (1577–1618), an early colonial leader in Virginia |
| Delta County | Colorado | The town of Delta, Colorado, which itself is named for its location on the broad river delta formed by the Gunnison River and the Uncompahgre River |
| Delta County | Michigan | The Greek letter Delta (Δ), referring to the triangular shape of the original county which included segments of Menominee, Dickinson, Iron and Marquette counties |
| Delta County | Texas | The Greek letter Delta (Δ), referring to the triangular shape of the county |
| Denali Borough | Alaska | Denali (Mount McKinley), the tallest North American mountain, from Dena'ina for "great one" |
| Dent County | Missouri | James Dent, settler |
| Denton County | Texas | John B. Denton, a preacher, lawyer, and soldier |
| City and County of Denver | Colorado | James W. Denver, a former governor of the Kansas Territory which the place was part of at the time |
| Des Moines County | Iowa | The Des Moines River |
| Deschutes County | Oregon | The Deschutes River, from the French words meaning "of the falls" |
| Desha County | Arkansas | Benjamin Desha, a soldier in the War of 1812 |
| DeSoto County | Florida | Hernando de Soto, a Spanish explorer and conquistador |
| DeSoto County | Mississippi | Hernando de Soto, a Spanish explorer and conquistador |
| Deuel County | Nebraska | The Deuel family |
| Deuel County | South Dakota | Jacob S. Deuel, pioneer legislator |
| Dewey County | Oklahoma | Either for Admiral George Dewey (1837–1917) or derived from its original name, County "D", during the land run of 1892 and later changed |
| Dewey County | South Dakota | William P. Dewey, territorial surveyor-general |
| DeWitt County | Illinois | DeWitt Clinton (1769–1828), Governor of New York, responsible for the construction of the Erie Canal |
| DeWitt County | Texas | Green DeWitt, an empresario who founded an early colony in Texas |
| Dickens County | Texas | J. Dickens, who died at the Battle of the Alamo |
| Dickenson County | Virginia | William J. Dickenson, delegate to the Virginia General Assembly |
| Dickey County | North Dakota | Dakota territorial legislator George H. Dickey |
| Dickinson County | Iowa | Daniel S. Dickinson (1800–1866), United States senator from New York |
| Dickinson County | Kansas | Daniel S. Dickinson (1800–1866), United States senator from New York |
| Dickinson County | Michigan | Donald M. Dickinson (1846–1917), Postmaster General in the Cleveland Administration |
| Dickson County | Tennessee | U.S. Representative William Dickson (1770–1816) |
| Dillingham Census Area | Alaska | The city of Dillingham, the largest settlement in the area, in turn named after U.S. Senator Paul Dillingham (1843–1923), who had toured Alaska extensively with his Senate subcommittee in 1903 |
| Dillon County | South Carolina | James W. Dillon, a wealthy Irish settler who campaigned to bring a railroad to the region. |
| Dimmit County | Texas | Philip Dimmitt, a major figure in the Texas Revolution |
| Dinwiddie County | Virginia | Robert Dinwiddie, lieutenant governor of colonial Virginia from 1751 to 1758 |
| Divide County | North Dakota | Created by division from Williams County |
| Dixie County | Florida | "Dixie", a common nickname for the southern United States |
| Dixon County | Nebraska | The Dixon family |
| Doddridge County | West Virginia | Philip Doddridge, U.S. congressman from Virginia |
| Dodge County | Georgia | William E. Dodge, a New York businessman who owned large tracts of forest land in Georgia |
| Dodge County | Minnesota | Henry Dodge (1782–1867), twice governor of Wisconsin |
| Dodge County | Wisconsin | Henry Dodge (1782–1867), twice governor of Wisconsin |
| Dodge County | Nebraska | Augustus C. Dodge, a United States senator from Iowa who was a supporter of the Kansas–Nebraska Act |
| Dolores County | Colorado | The Dolores River, itself originally named by Spanish explorers as El Río de Nuestra Señora de Delores ("The River of Our Lady of Sorrows") |
| Doña Ana County | New Mexico | The town of Doña Ana, the county's first seat, which in turn was named for Doña Ana Robledo, a 17th-century woman known for her charitable giving |
| Doniphan County | Kansas | A. W. Doniphan |
| Donley County | Texas | Stockton P. Donley, a frontier lawyer |
| Dooly County | Georgia | Colonel John Dooly, a Revolutionary War hero who helped prosecute Tories in 1779 and was killed by them the following year |
| Door County | Wisconsin | A water passage known as Porte des morts, French for "door of the dead" after many Native Americans died in the passage during a conflict |
| Dorchester County | Maryland | The town of Dorchester, Dorset, in England; Thomas Sackville, 1st Earl of Dorset was a friend of the Calvert family |
| Dorchester County | South Carolina | The town of Dorchester, Massachusetts |
| Dougherty County | Georgia | Judge Charles Dougherty of Athens, Georgia |
| Douglas County | Colorado | Stephen A. Douglas (1813–1861), prominent Illinois Democrat and rival of Abraham Lincoln for the presidency |
| Douglas County | Georgia | Stephen A. Douglas (1813–1861), prominent Illinois Democrat and rival of Abraham Lincoln for the presidency |
| Douglas County | Illinois | Stephen A. Douglas (1813–1861), prominent Illinois Democrat and rival of Abraham Lincoln for the presidency |
| Douglas County | Kansas | Stephen A. Douglas (1813–1861), prominent Illinois Democrat and rival of Abraham Lincoln for the presidency |
| Douglas County | Minnesota | Stephen A. Douglas (1813–1861), prominent Illinois Democrat and rival of Abraham Lincoln for the presidency |
| Douglas County | Missouri | Stephen A. Douglas (1813–1861), prominent Illinois Democrat and rival of Abraham Lincoln for the presidency |
| Douglas County | Nebraska | Stephen A. Douglas (1813–1861), prominent Illinois Democrat and rival of Abraham Lincoln for the presidency |
| Douglas County | Nevada | Stephen A. Douglas (1813–1861), prominent Illinois Democrat and rival of Abraham Lincoln for the presidency |
| Douglas County | Oregon | Stephen A. Douglas (1813–1861), prominent Illinois Democrat and rival of Abraham Lincoln for the presidency |
| Douglas County | South Dakota | Stephen A. Douglas (1813–1861), prominent Illinois Democrat and rival of Abraham Lincoln for the presidency |
| Douglas County | Washington | Stephen A. Douglas (1813–1861), prominent Illinois Democrat and rival of Abraham Lincoln for the presidency |
| Douglas County | Wisconsin | Stephen A. Douglas (1813–1861), prominent Illinois Democrat and rival of Abraham Lincoln for the presidency |
| Drew County | Arkansas | Thomas Stevenson Drew (1802–1879), third Governor of Arkansas |
| Dubois County | Indiana | Toussaint Dubois, who fought in the War of 1812 |
| Dubuque County | Iowa | Julien Dubuque (1762–1810), first permanent white settler in Iowa |
| Duchesne County | Utah | Uncertain; perhaps Fort Duchesne; or Du Chasne, a French fur trapper in the 1830s; or French historian André Duchesne (1584–1640); or Rose Philippine Duchesne (1769–1852), founder of the Society of the Sacred Heart in the state; or an Indian chief in past years; or a Ute word translated as "dark canyon" |
| Dukes County | Massachusetts | King James II, who was Duke of York before his accession |
| Dundy County | Nebraska | Elmer Scipio Dundy, a U.S. Circuit Court judge from Nebraska |
| Dunklin County | Missouri | Daniel Dunklin (1790–1844), fifth governor of Missouri |
| Dunn County | North Dakota | John P. Dunn, an early civic leader of Bismarck |
| Dunn County | Wisconsin | Charles Dunn, state senator and chief justice of the Wisconsin Territory |
| DuPage County | Illinois | The DuPage River, which flows through the county and was named for a French trader |
| Duplin County | North Carolina | British nobleman Thomas Hay, Viscount Dupplin (1710–1787) |
| Durham County | North Carolina | The city of Durham, which was named in honor of Dr. Bartlett S. Durham, who donated the land on which the railroad station was located |
| Dutchess County | New York | Mary of Modena, the Duchess of York, in 1683 |
| Duval County | Florida | William Pope Duval (1784–1854), the first governor of the Florida Territory |
| Duval County | Texas | Burr H. Duval (1809–1836), a soldier in the Texas Revolution who died in the Goliad Massacre |
| Dyer County | Tennessee | Tennessee state legislator Robert Henry Dyer |

== See also ==
- Lists of U.S. county name etymologies for links to the remainder of the list.
