= Bracken, Missouri =

Unincorporated community in Missouri, U.S.

Coordinates: 37°20′26″N 92°47′11″W

Bracken is an unincorporated community in Webster County, in the U.S. state of Missouri.

Bracken is located on Missouri Route DD, approximately six miles east of Marshfield. The headwaters of Bracken Creek are to the northeast of the community.

== History ==
A post office called Bracken was established in 1877, and remained in operation until 1906. The community takes its name from nearby Bracken Creek.
