= Bracken Creek =

Stream in the American state of Missouri

Bracken Creek is a small, mostly intermittent stream in Webster County, Missouri. It is a tributary of the Osage Fork Gasconade River.

The stream source is at: 37°19′43″N 92°45′33″W and the confluence is at 37°22′26″N 92°47′23″W. The stream headwaters are northeast of Bracken and it flows north then northwest roughly parallel to Missouri Route JJ to its confluence with Osage Fork south of Route M and east-southeast of Niangua.

Bracken Creek has the name of the local Bracken family. The Brackens settled near the creek in about 1850.

== See also ==
- List of rivers of Missouri
