= Granville Craig =

Granville Craig was a prominent Cherokee farmer living near Welch and Bluejacket, Indian Territory, in the late nineteenth century. Craig County, Oklahoma is named after him.
