= National Register of Historic Places listings in Sullivan County, Tennessee =

Register of Historic Places

Location of Sullivan County in Tennessee

This is a list of the National Register of Historic Places listings in Sullivan County, Tennessee.

This is intended to be a complete list of the properties and districts on the National Register of Historic Places in Sullivan County, Tennessee, United States. Latitude and longitude coordinates are provided for many National Register properties and districts; these locations may be seen together in a map.

There are 46 properties and districts listed on the National Register in the county, including 1 National Historic Landmark. Another 7 properties were once listed but have been removed.

Contents: Counties in Tennessee
Anderson – Bedford – Benton – Bledsoe – Blount – Bradley – Campbell – Cannon – Carroll – Carter – Cheatham – Chester – Claiborne – Clay – Cocke – Coffee – Crockett – Cumberland – Davidson – Decatur – DeKalb – Dickson – Dyer – Fayette – Fentress – Franklin – Gibson – Giles – Grainger – Greene – Grundy – Hamblen – Hamilton – Hancock – Hardeman – Hardin – Hawkins – Haywood – Henderson – Henry – Hickman – Houston – Humphreys – Jackson – Jefferson – Johnson – Knox – Lake – Lauderdale – Lawrence – Lewis – Lincoln – Loudon – Macon – Madison – Marion – Marshall – Maury – McMinn – McNairy – Meigs – Monroe – Montgomery – Moore – Morgan – Obion – Overton – Perry – Pickett – Polk – Putnam – Rhea – Roane – Robertson – Rutherford – Scott – Sequatchie – Sevier – Shelby – Smith – Stewart – Sullivan – Sumner – Tipton – Trousdale – Unicoi – Union – Van Buren – Warren – Washington – Wayne – Weakley – White – Williamson – Wilson

This National Park Service list is complete through NPS recent listings posted December 12, 2025.

== Current listings ==
	Name on the Register	Image	Date listed	Location	City or town	Description
1	Finlay Alison House		April 11, 1973 (#73001851)	West of Piney Flats off U.S. Route 11E; 36°25′22″N 82°21′34″W	Piney Flats vicinity	
2	Arcadia	Arcadia	April 11, 1973 (#73001834)	East of Bloomingdale off U.S. Route 11W; 36°35′01″N 82°26′43″W	Arcadia	
3	Blountville Historic District	Blountville Historic District	February 23, 1973 (#73001835)	Center of Blountville along both sides of State Route 126; also roughly bounded by the Blountville Cemetery, Great Stage and Massengill Rds., and the Blountville Bypass; 36°31′58″N 82°19′37″W	Blountville	Second set of addresses represents a boundary increase of March 26, 2014
4	Boatyard Historic District	Boatyard Historic District	December 12, 1973 (#73001785)	Southwest of Kingsport on the Holston River and the South Fork of the Holston River; 36°33′02″N 82°36′17″W	Kingsport vicinity	
5	Boone Hydroelectric Project	Boone Hydroelectric Project	October 26, 2017 (#100001476)	301 Boone Dam Rd. 36°26′25″N 82°26′12″W	Kingsport vicinity	Extends into Washington County
6	Bristol Commercial Historic District	Bristol Commercial Historic District	May 22, 2003 (#03000441)	Roughly along State, Piedmont, Moore, Shelby, Bank, Progress, 5th, 6th, 7th, and 8th Sts. 36°35′38″N 82°11′03″W	Bristol	Extends into Bristol, Virginia
7	Bristol Municipal Stadium	Bristol Municipal Stadium	June 25, 1987 (#87001039)	1112 Edgemont Ave. 36°34′57″N 82°11′00″W	Bristol	
8	Bristol Virginia–Tennessee slogan sign	Bristol Virginia–Tennessee slogan sign	September 8, 1988 (#88001568)	E. State St. 36°35′40″N 82°10′45″W	Bristol	Extends into Bristol, Virginia
9	Church Circle District	Church Circle District	April 11, 1973 (#73001841)	Along Sullivan in the center of Kingsport; 36°32′59″N 82°33′29″W	Kingsport	
10	Clinchfield Railroad Station	Clinchfield Railroad Station	April 24, 1973 (#73001842)	101 E. Main St. 36°32′40″N 82°33′45″W	Kingsport	
11	DeVault-Masengill House		March 28, 1985 (#85000669)	Andrew Johnson Highway, U.S. Route 11E; 36°24′20″N 82°20′40″W	Piney Flats	An alternate spelling of Massengill is also used.
12	East Hill Cemetery	East Hill Cemetery	March 28, 2011 (#11000142)	E. State St. at Georgia Ave. 36°35′39″N 82°10′16″W	Bristol	American Civil War-era cemetery with sections for Confederate soldiers and veterans as well as a small section for African American burials. Extends into Bristol, Virginia
13	Earles Drug Store		August 1, 2025 (#100012070)	134 West Center Street; 36°32′53″N 82°33′39″W	Kingsport	
14	Erwin Farm		April 11, 1973 (#73001836)	West of Blountville off State Route 75; 36°31′24″N 82°22′30″W	Blountville vicinity	
15	Fairmont Neighborhood Historic District	Fairmont Neighborhood Historic District	July 30, 2010 (#10000510)	Roughly bounded by Taylor St., Pennsylvania Ave., Maple St., and Florida Ave. 36°35′20″N 82°10′13″W	Bristol	
16	First National Bank of Bristol	First National Bank of Bristol	July 25, 1985 (#85001606)	500 State St. 36°35′41″N 82°10′57″W	Bristol	
17	Fort Patrick Henry Hydroelectric Project	Fort Patrick Henry Hydroelectric Project	October 26, 2017 (#100001477)	Rt. 1 Box 2385; 36°29′52″N 82°30′30″W	Kingsport	
18	Gammon House	Gammon House	March 10, 2009 (#09000119)	324 6th St. 36°35′28″N 82°11′02″W	Bristol	
19	Grass Dale	Grass Dale	October 25, 1984 (#84000140)	774 Bloomingdale Pike; 36°33′30″N 82°33′22″W	Kingsport	
20	Alexander Doak Hall Farm	Alexander Doak Hall Farm	July 28, 1995 (#95000931)	440 Proffitt Ln. 36°26′51″N 82°28′39″W	Kingsport	
21	Holston Avenue Neighborhood Historic District	Holston Avenue Neighborhood Historic District	November 14, 2012 (#12000945)	Roughly Holston, 7th, 8th, and Watauga Aves., and Haynes, Orchard, Clyde Reser, Reynolds, and Weise Sts. 36°35′08″N 82°11′18″W	Bristol	
22	J. Fred Johnson House	J. Fred Johnson House	April 11, 1973 (#73001843)	1322 Watauga Ave. 36°32′38″N 82°32′22″W	Kingsport	
23	Edward Washington King House	Edward Washington King House	November 18, 1999 (#99001371)	308 7th St. 36°35′32″N 82°11′10″W	Bristol	
24	Kingsport Hosiery Mills		November 16, 2020 (#100005791)	435 Press St. 36°33′05″N 82°33′46″W	Kingsport	
25	Long Island of the Holston	Long Island of the Holston	October 15, 1966 (#66000733)	South Fork of the Holston River; 36°31′49″N 82°33′39″W	Kingsport	
26	Martin-Dobyns House	Martin-Dobyns House	March 26, 2014 (#14000088)	1434 Watauga St. 36°32′27″N 82°32′04″W	Kingsport	
27	Mount Ida	Mount Ida	April 2, 1973 (#73001844)	1010-1012 Sevier Terrace Dr. 36°33′29″N 82°34′12″W	Kingsport	
28	Netherland Inn and Complex	Netherland Inn and Complex	December 23, 1969 (#69000182)	2144 Netherland Inn Rd. 36°33′05″N 82°35′48″W	Kingsport	
29	Old Deery Inn	Old Deery Inn	May 7, 1973 (#73001838)	Main St. 36°31′59″N 82°19′34″W	Blountville	
30	Old Kingsport Presbyterian Church	Old Kingsport Presbyterian Church	October 2, 1973 (#73001845)	2049 Greenway St; 36°33′22″N 82°35′32″W	Kingsport	
31	Paramount Theatre and Office Building	Paramount Theatre and Office Building	April 4, 1985 (#85000701)	516 State St. 36°35′41″N 82°10′59″W	Bristol	
32	Parlett House	Parlett House	August 18, 1983 (#83003070)	728 Georgia Ave. 36°35′19″N 82°10′04″W	Bristol	
33	Pemberton Mansion and Oak		March 14, 1973 (#73001840)	1152 Pemberton Rd; 36°33′45″N 82°04′24″W	Bristol	
34	Pierce Chapel AME Church Cemetery	Pierce Chapel AME Church Cemetery	July 14, 2000 (#00000809)	Seaver Rd. at Horse Creek Rd. 36°30′04″N 82°34′40″W	Kingsport	
35	Piney Flats Historic District		November 15, 2011 (#11000808)	Main, McKamey, and Methodist Church Sts. and parts of Tank Hill, Piney Flats, Austin Springs, and Mountain View Rds. 36°25′07″N 82°18′22″W	Piney Flats	
36	Preston Farm	Preston Farm	September 3, 1971 (#71000837)	4812 Orebank Rd. 36°32′38″N 82°29′10″W	Kingsport	
37	Rock Ledge	Rock Ledge	May 24, 1978 (#78002639)	117 Stuffle Place; 36°34′35″N 82°30′52″W	Kingsport	
38	Rocky Mount	Rocky Mount	February 26, 1970 (#70000617)	200 Hyder Hill Rd; 36°24′21″N 82°20′12″W	Piney Flats	
39	Roller-Pettyjohn Mill	Roller-Pettyjohn Mill	December 7, 1977 (#77001293)	676 Fall Creek Rd; 36°31′48″N 82°26′52″W	Blountville	
40	South Holston Hydroelectric Project	South Holston Hydroelectric Project	August 14, 2017 (#100001478)	918 South View Rd. 36°31′24″N 82°05′20″W	Bristol	
41	Steel-Seneker Houses		August 22, 1977 (#77001294)	4 miles (6.4 km) west of Bristol on State Route 126; 36°33′56″N 82°15′44″W	Bristol vicinity	
42	Stone-Penn House	Stone-Penn House	November 15, 1984 (#84000669)	1306 Watauga St. 36°32′39″N 82°32′25″W	Kingsport	
43	US Post Office-Shelby Street Station	US Post Office-Shelby Street Station	November 7, 1985 (#85002772)	620 Shelby St. 36°35′37″N 82°11′04″W	Bristol	
44	George Washington School	George Washington School	March 21, 2007 (#07000184)	205 E. Sevier Ave. 36°32′54″N 82°33′13″W	Kingsport	
45	Wills-Dickey Stone House	Wills-Dickey Stone House	March 30, 1973 (#73001849)	2670 Pratt Rd; 36°35′22″N 82°34′18″W	Kingsport	
46	Yancey's Tavern	Yancey's Tavern	April 11, 1973 (#73001850)	East of Kingsport on State Route 126; 36°32′55″N 82°27′28″W	Kingsport vicinity	

== Former listings ==
	Name on the Register	Image	Date listed	Date removed	Location	City or town	Description
1	Jesse Alison House		April 2, 1973 (#73001839)	July 17, 2012	Southwest of Bluff City off U.S. Route 11E; 36°26′08″N 82°21′17″W	Bluff City vicinity	Demolished
2	Grand Guitar	Grand Guitar	March 11, 2014 (#14000057)	March 27, 2020	3245 W. State St. 36°35′36″N 82°14′50″W	Bristol	Deemed structurally unsound and demolished in August 2019
3	Moses Looney Fort House	Moses Looney Fort House	January 18, 1978 (#78002638)	March 17, 2025	567 Island Rd; 36°33′19″N 82°25′28″W	Kingsport	
4	Pearson Brick House		April 11, 1973 (#73001846)	March 20, 2017	East of Kingsport on Shipley Ferry Rd. 36°28′55″N 82°28′21″W	Kingsport vicinity	
5	Roseland		April 2, 1973 (#73001847)	August 27, 2013	South of Kingsport on Shipp St. 36°31′24″N 82°33′43″W	Kingsport vicinity	Relocated to Preston Farm.
6	Spring Place		April 11, 1973 (#73001848)	July 17, 2013	Northwest of Kingsport on W. Carter's Valley Rd., off U.S. Route 23; 36°35′26″N 82°36′13″W	Kingsport vicinity	
7	Squire John Fain Barn	Squire John Fain Barn	April 11, 1973 (#73001837)	December 30, 1985	Lone Oak Estates, TN 126	Blountville	Destroyed by fire in 1984.

== See also ==
- List of National Historic Landmarks in Tennessee
- National Register of Historic Places listings in Tennessee
