= National Register of Historic Places listings in Bristol, Virginia =

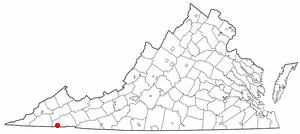
Location of Bristol in Virginia

This is a list of the National Register of Historic Places listings in Bristol, Virginia.

This is intended to be a complete list of the properties and districts on the National Register of Historic Places in the independent city of Bristol, Virginia, United States. The locations of National Register properties and districts for which the latitude and longitude coordinates are included below, may be seen in an online map.

There are 13 properties and districts listed on the National Register in the city.

This National Park Service list is complete through NPS recent listings posted May 1, 2026.

== Current listings ==
	Name on the Register	Image	Date listed	Location	Description
1	Bristol Commercial Historic District	Bristol Commercial Historic District	May 22, 2003 (#03000441)	Roughly along State, Piedmont, Moore, Shelby, Bank, Progress, 5th, 6th, 7th, and 8th Sts.; also 40-115 Piedmont Ave. 36°35′42″N 82°11′00″W	Second set of addresses represents a boundary increase approved September 18, 2017.
2	Bristol Railroad Station	Bristol Railroad Station	November 28, 1980 (#80004173)	State and Washington Sts. 36°35′44″N 82°10′48″W	
3	Bristol Virginia–Tennessee slogan sign	Bristol Virginia–Tennessee slogan sign	September 8, 1988 (#88001568)	E. State St. 36°35′42″N 82°10′46″W	
4	Bristol Warehouse Historic District	Bristol Warehouse Historic District	May 9, 2012 (#12000273)	Scott and Lee Sts. 36°35′53″N 82°10′53″W	
5	Douglass School	Douglass School	February 2, 2005 (#04001592)	711 Oakview Ave. 36°36′26″N 82°10′31″W	
6	East Hill Cemetery	East Hill Cemetery	March 28, 2011 (#11000142)	E. State St. at Georgia Ave. 36°35′42″N 82°10′21″W	American Civil War-era cemetery with sections for Confederate soldiers and veterans as well as a small section for African American burials. Extends into Sullivan County, Tennessee
7	Euclid Avenue Historic District	Euclid Avenue Historic District	May 10, 2006 (#06000369)	Along sections of Arlington, Euclid, Fairmount, Glenway, Highland, Lawrence, and Piedmont Aves., and Chester, Grove, and Lindsey; 36°36′20″N 82°11′15″W	
8	First Baptist Church	First Baptist Church	December 15, 2015 (#15000905)	1 Virginia St. 36°35′42″N 82°10′41″W	
9	King–Lancaster–McCoy–Mitchell House	King–Lancaster–McCoy–Mitchell House	July 29, 1994 (#94000793)	54 King St. 36°35′50″N 82°11′10″W	
10	Solar Hill Historic District	Solar Hill Historic District	July 5, 2001 (#01000703)	Roughly along Johnson, Solar, West, King, Cumberland, and Sycamore Sts. 36°35′57″N 82°11′06″W	
11	Virginia High School	Virginia High School	February 21, 1997 (#97000159)	501 Piedmont Ave. 36°36′18″N 82°11′01″W	
12	Virginia Hill Historic District	Virginia Hill Historic District	November 27, 2002 (#02001447)	Sections of Moore, Lee, Russell, Clinton, Spencer, W. Mary, and Buchanan Sts. 36°36′03″N 82°10′45″W	
13	Virginia Intermont College	Virginia Intermont College	October 4, 1984 (#84000032)	Moore and Harmeling Sts. 36°36′18″N 82°10′35″W	

== See also ==
- List of National Historic Landmarks in Virginia
- National Register of Historic Places listings in Virginia
- National Register of Historic Places listings in Washington County, Virginia
