= Blountsville =

Blountsville or Blountville may refer to:

- Blountsville, Alabama
- Blountsville, Georgia
- Blountsville, Indiana
- Blountville, Tennessee

== See also ==
- Battle of Blountsville
