= Bud Phillips (author) =

American author and historian (1929–2017)

- Born: Victor N. Phillips; August 25, 1929; Johnson County, Kansas, U.S.
- Died: January 9, 2017 (aged 87); Bristol, Virginia, U.S.
- Occupation: Author; historian

Victor N. "Bud" Phillips (August 25, 1929 – January 9, 2017) was an American author and historian from Bristol, Virginia.

== Biography ==
Phillips was born in Northeastern Johnson County, Arkansas. At the age of fifteen, he began preaching and traveling, and came to Bristol in 1953 on a bus. He was connected with the Graham Institute and Evangelical Association.

In 1982, Phillips moved to the Solar Hill Historic District in Bristol, Virginia, where he would reside until his death.

Phillips primarily wrote books on history. His writings include Ghosts of Bristol: Haunting Tales from the Twin cities and Hidden History of Bristol: Stories from the State Line.

== Legacy ==
Phillips was honored with "Bud Phillips Day" a holiday that is celebrated in Bristol every May 5. In 2006, Phillips was named official historian of Bristol.

== Books ==
- Ghosts of Bristol: Haunting Tales from the Twin Cities (2010). ISBN 1609490827.
- Hidden History of Bristol: Stories from the State Line (2010). ISBN 1609490479.
- Pioneers in Paradise: Legends and Stories from Bristol, Tennessee/Virginia (2002). ISBN 157072234X.
- Book of Kings: The King Family's Contribution to the History of Bristol, Tennessee/Virginia (1999). ISBN 1570720835.
- A Good Place to Live: Bristol, Tennessee/Virginia (2006). ISBN 1570723141.
- Forgive Me Father, for I Have Grinned (2006). ISBN 1570723001.
- Between the States: Bristol Tennessee/Virginia During the Civil War (1997). ISBN 1570720681.
- Bristol Tennessee/Virginia: A History 1852-1900 (1992). ISBN 0932807631.
- Coming Down Cumberland: A History of the Maggard Family of Eastern Kentucky (1991). ISBN 9781570722950.
