= First Baptist Church (Bristol, Virginia) =

Historic church in Virginia, United States

- U.S. National Register of Historic Places
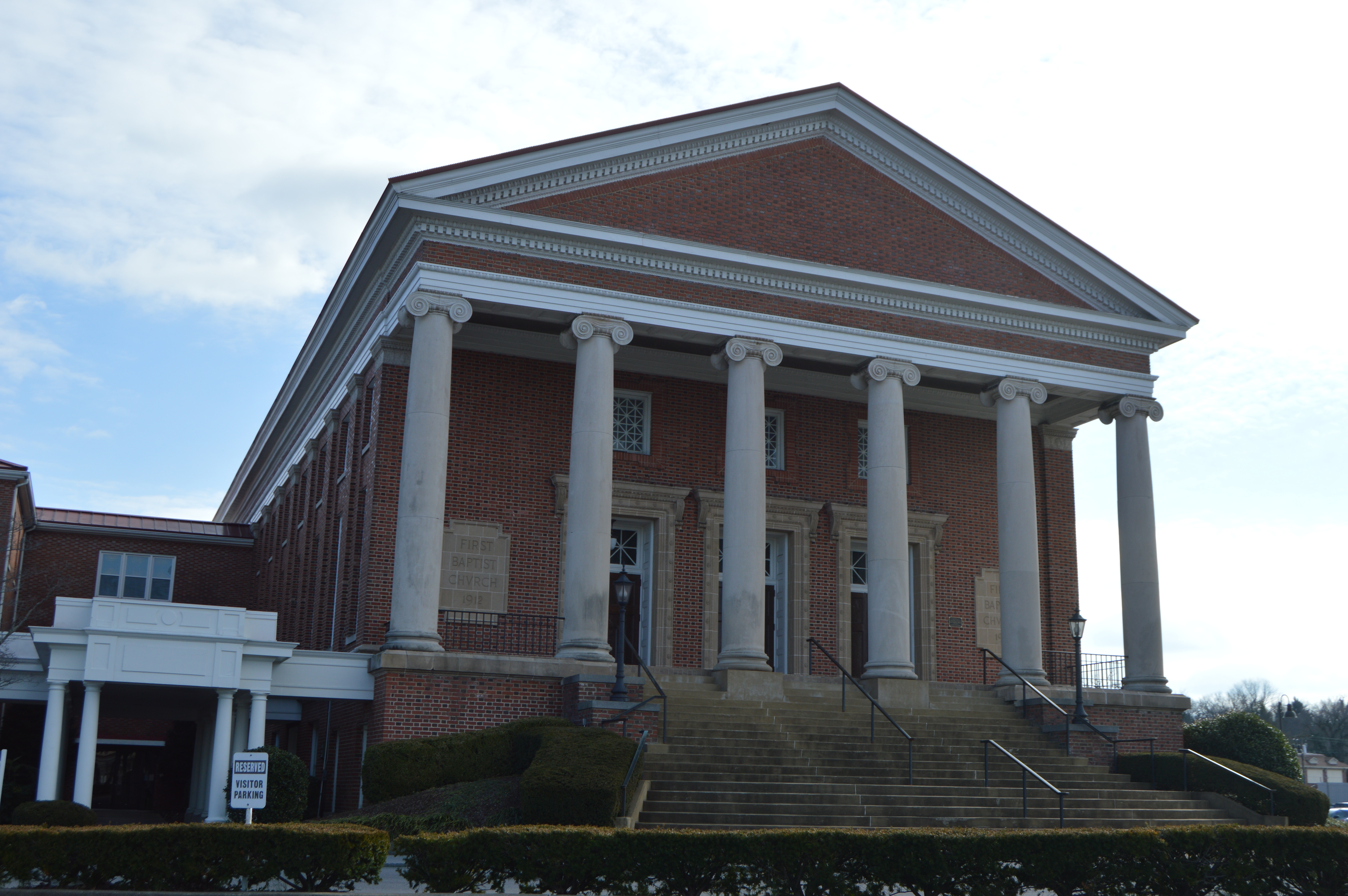
- Front and northern side

- Location within Virginia Location within the United States
- Location: 125 Sedgefield St., Bristol, Virginia
- Coordinates: 36°35′42″N 82°10′42″W
- Area: less than one acre
- Built: 1912
- Architectural style: Classical Revival
- NRHP reference No.: 15000905
- Added to NRHP: December 15, 2015

The First Baptist Church is a historic Baptist church at 1 Virginia Street in Bristol, Virginia. It is a rectangular 1 1/2-story brick structure, resembling a Greek temple of the Ionic order. Its front facade is divided by six round columns, which support an entablature and fully pedimented gable. There are three entrances sheltered by this portico. The side walls are divided into bays articulated by Doric pilasters, with sash windows topped by individual clerestory-style windows. Built in 1912, and enlarged in 1964, it is one of the most imposing examples of Classical Revival architecture in southwestern Virginia.

The building was added to the National Register of Historic Places in 2015.

== See also ==
- National Register of Historic Places listings in Bristol, Virginia
