= Samuel Jones (general) =

United States Army officer (1819–1887)

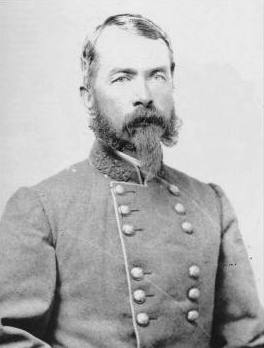
- Born: December 17, 1819; Powhatan County, Virginia, U.S.
- Died: July 31, 1887 (aged 67); Bedford Springs, Pennsylvania, U.S.
- Burial place: Hollywood Cemetery, Richmond, Virginia, U.S.
- Military career
- Allegiance: United States of America; Confederate States of America
- Branch: United States Army; Confederate States Army
- Service years: 1841–1861 (USA); 1861–1865 (CSA)
- Rank: Captain (USA); Major general (CSA)
- Commands: Bartow's Brigade; Department of East Tennessee; Department of Western Virginia; Department of South Carolina, Georgia and Florida; Department of Florida and South Georgia
- Conflicts: American Civil War: First Battle of Manassas; Battle of Blountville; Battle of Natural Bridge
- Other work: Farmer, college president

Samuel Jones (December 17, 1819 – July 31, 1887) was a major general in the Confederate States Army during the American Civil War. At the midpoint of the war, he commanded the Department of Western Virginia, defending the Virginia and Tennessee Railroad and the vital salt mines. Later he commanded the district of South Carolina.

== Early life ==
On December 17, 1819, Samuel Jones was born at "Woodfield", his parents' plantation in Powhatan County, Virginia. His father, Samuel Jones, was a nephew and ward of Governor William Branch Giles, of Virginia, under whose care he was brought up, and a graduate of Princeton College. Jones' mother was Ann Moseley, daughter of Mr. Edward Moseley, of Powhatan County.

Jones was appointed a cadet at West Point United States Military Academy from Virginia July 1, 1837, and was graduated and was brevetted as a second lieutenant in the 2nd Artillery Regiment on September 28, 1841. His first duty was on the Maine frontier, at Houlton, pending the Disputed Territory controversy with Canada. He was on duty at West Point, 1846–51, as assistant professor of mathematics and assistant instructor in artillery and infantry tactics.

He was appointed assistant to the Judge Advocate of the Army at Washington and continued in the discharge of the duties of his position until he resigned his commission in the Army of the United States April 27, 1861. Thus immediately prior to the American Civil War he was on the staff of the Judge Advocate of the Army in Washington, D.C.

== Civil War ==
With the secession of Virginia in 1861, Jones was commissioned as a major in the State of Virginia corps of artillery on May 1, 1861 in the military force of Virginia and later was promoted to be Colonel.

He later joined the Provisional Confederate Army and was promoted to colonel in recognition of his service, and on July 21, 1861, was promoted to brigadier general (the brigade consisted of the Seventh, Eighth, Ninth and Eleventh Georgia, and the Fourth Kentucky Regiments of Infantry and Alberto's Artillery). On July 22, 1861, he was made Chief of Artillery and Ordnance of the C.S. Army of Northern Virginia. He served on the staff of General P G T Beauregard at the First Battle of Manassas, and was appointed to the command of the brigade of C.S. Army Colonel Francis S. Bartow, which had lost its commander on the field of Manassas.

On January 22, 1862, C.S. Army Brigadier General Jones was appointed to the command of the Department of Alabama & West Florida which Pensacola was the headquarters. He was promoted to major general on March 10, 1862.

On September 23, 1862, Jones was assigned command of the Department of East Tennessee. This assignment was short-lived, however. Jones commanded the department for only twenty-seven days. In the meantime, the main Confederate army under Braxton Bragg had been defeated at the Battle of Perryville in Kentucky and was returning to Tennessee. On October 20, Edmund Kirby Smith, who had previously commanded the Department and had accompanied the army into Kentucky, returned and formally resumed command of the Department of East Tennessee, replacing Jones.

From December 4, 1862, until March 4, 1864, Jones commanded the Department of Western Virginia, with his headquarters at Dublin, Virginia. He was in general charge of the operations in defense of the Virginia and Tennessee Railroad and the vital salt mines. The September 1863 Battle of Blountville was the initial step in a Union attempt to force Jones and his command to retire from East Tennessee. Jones was replaced in favor of General John Cabell Breckinridge.

From April 1864 to October 1864, he was in command of the Department of South Carolina, Georgia, and Florida. He then commanded the District of South Carolina until January 1865. When the Union Navy began shelling Charleston, South Carolina, Jones placed fifty captured Federal officers brought into town under guard. He then advised Union Maj. Gen. John G. Foster to stop the bombardment unless he wanted to risk killing his own men. An irate Foster retaliated by placing captured Confederates, including Brig. Gen. M. Jeff Thompson, directly in the line of fire from Jones's guns.

In February 1865, Jones was named the commander of the Department of Florida and South Georgia, a post he held until the end of hostilities. Here he made one of the last stands of the Confederacy at the Battle of Natural Bridge, and held his position until the surrender at Appomattox, Virginia. He surrendered at Tallahassee, Florida on May 10, 1865.

== Postbellum ==
From 1873 to 1875, Jones served as president of the Maryland Agricultural College.

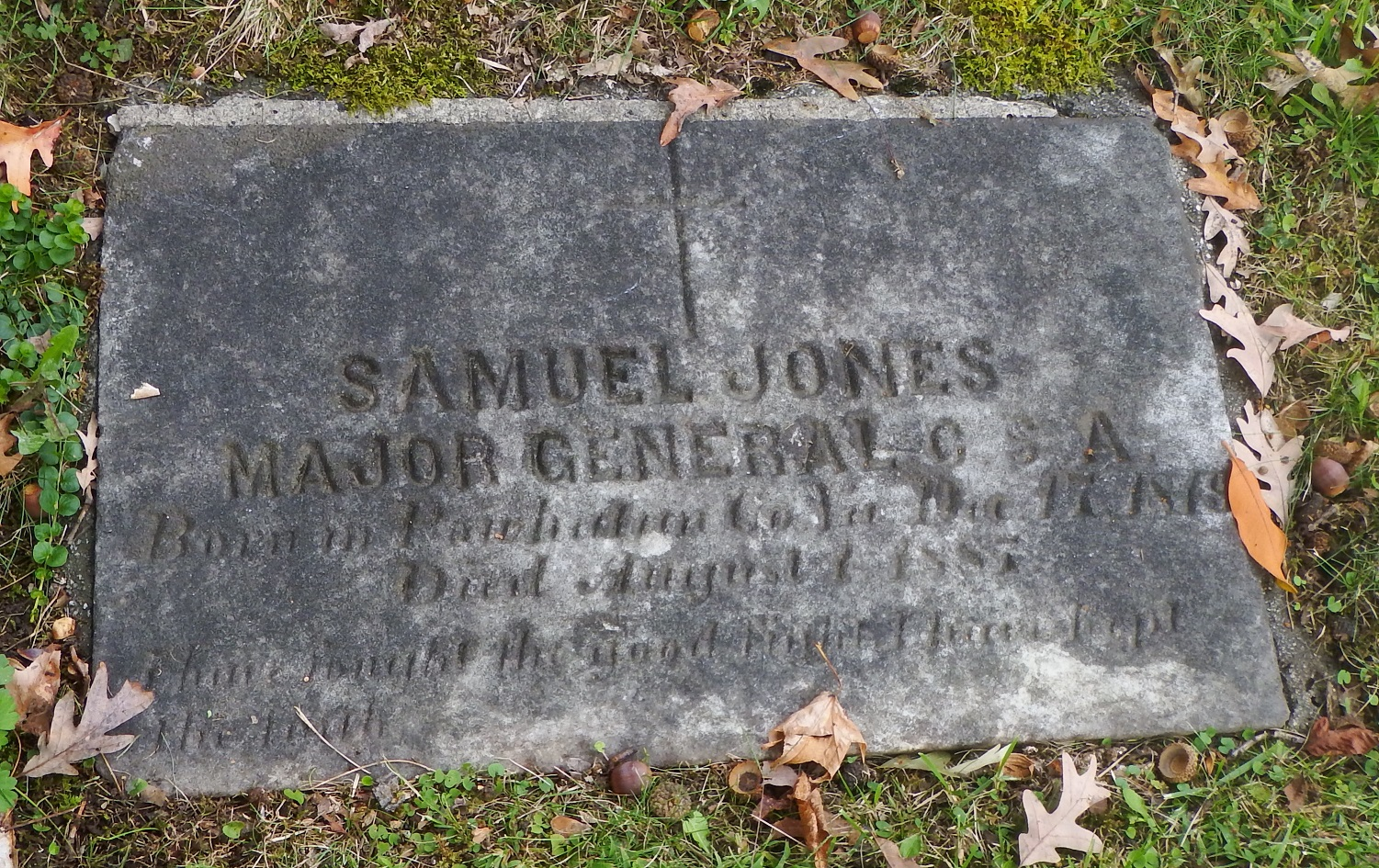
Grave of Jones at Hollywood Cemetery

Jones died in Bedford Springs, Pennsylvania, and is buried in Hollywood Cemetery in Richmond, Virginia.

== See also ==
- List of American Civil War Generals (Confederate)
