= King–Lancaster–McCoy–Mitchell House =

Historic house in Virginia, United States

- King–Lancaster–McCoy–Mitchell-Shew House
- U.S. National Register of Historic Places
- U.S. Historic district – Contributing property
- Virginia Landmarks Register
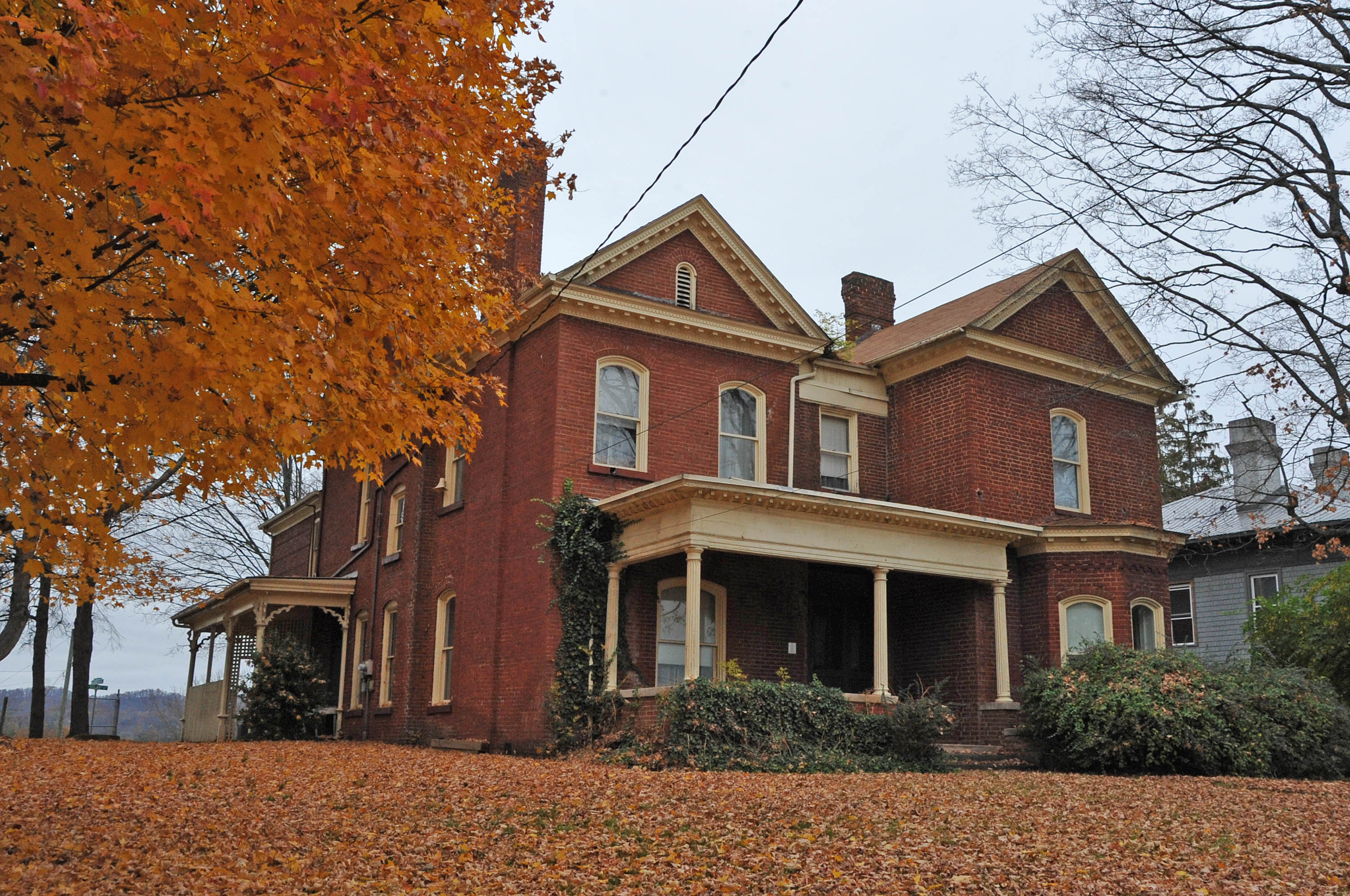
- King–Lancaster–McCoy–Mitchell House in 2008

- Location within Virginia Location within the United States
- Location: 54 King St., Bristol, Virginia
- Coordinates: 36°35′50″N 82°11′14″W
- Area: less than one acre
- Built: c. 1820, 1881, 1892, and 1903
- Architect: Beaver, Hoffmeister & Mould; Hoffmeister & Doriot
- Architectural style: Italianate
- Part of: Solar Hill Historic District (ID01000073)
- NRHP reference No.: 94000793
- VLR No.: 102-0019

Significant dates
- Added to NRHP: July 29, 1994
- Designated CP: July 5, 2001
- Designated VLR: April 20, 1994

The King–Lancaster–McCoy–Mitchell-Shew House is an historic home in Bristol, Virginia. The original section was built between 1815 and 1820, with additions and alterations dating from 1881, 1892, and 1903. It is a two-story, irregular shaped, gable-roofed, brick dwelling in a Victorian Italianate-style with some Colonial Revival details.

The large brick home is the most historic house in Bristol, Virginia. The handmade brick residence was built 1816-1820 by Colonel James King on the highest point of his property overlooking his meadows where he raised cattle. The settlement was once known as “King’s Meadows” before it took the name of Bristol nearly half a century later.

Colonel James King and his son, the Reverend James King, were key figures in the founding and development of Bristol. They contributed to the business world through the iron business and the commerce of buying and selling. The Reverend James King gifted the land needed to create Bristol's King University and served as pastor for two early Presbyterian churches. The King family occupied the house until 1853. President Andrew Jackson was a frequent visitor to the house and was escorted to Washington for his inauguration by William King. The Sapling Grove post office operated from the house from 1839 to 1853, and the house was a stopping point for stagecoaches traveling from Abingdon to Blountville from 1839 to 1856. Mountain View High School, which became Sullins College, began in the house in 1869.

In 1991, the Bristol Historical Association initiated a study concerning the oldest section of the home which is the remainder of Colonel James King's original dwelling. This fact is verified by an elaborate map of Washington County drawn by John Wood in 1820 in which the site of Bristol is marked with a small square, and the legend “Colonel James King’s brick house”. Analysis by the Department of Historic Resources in Richmond, Virginia, revealed that the original structure consisted of a two-room plan, divided by a central winding staircase leading to two bedrooms upstairs. These original rooms, enclosed within additions made over the years, make it the oldest existing structure within the city limits of Bristol. The formal entrance was originally on the north elevation. A rear wing housing the kitchen is presumed to be part of the original building or added shortly after the original structure was constructed.

Changes to the house were made by subsequent owners. In 1881, John J. Lancaster, a prominent wealthy banker of New York City, remodeled it as a gift for his mother and two maiden sisters. In 1981, H.E. McCoy, the founder of Bristol's Dominion National Bank, built a major addition to the house for a new living room entrance hall and portico redirecting the formal entrance to the east elevation. The addition completed an ingenious composition by connecting an identical two-story gabled façade1820 structure with a flat roofed “hyphen” which housed the bathroom above and formal entry hall below.

In 1903, Joseph D. Mitchell added a kitchen wing that is distinguished only by the ornate Carpenter Gothic wood columns. Mitchell came to Bristol in 1882, with only two dollars in his pocket and boarded at the house with Mrs. Thomas Lancaster. She put him in what is now the dining room, and later when he became wealthy, he confessed that on the first night he spent there that he vowed he would someday own the grand house on the hill overlooking the town. About 19 years later, his dream came true. The house belonged to the Mitchell family for over 100 years. Mitchell's daughter, Margaret, was born in the house in 1901 and lived there for 99 of her 102 years. Margaret willed the house and its contents to King University, and the property now belongs to Daniel and Monica Shew.

It was listed on the National Register of Historic Places in 1994, and included in the Solar Hill Historic District in 2001.

History provided by the Bristol VA Historical Association. 2007
