= Virginia Hill Historic District =

Historic district in Virginia, United States

- U.S. National Register of Historic Places
- U.S. Historic district
- Virginia Landmarks Register
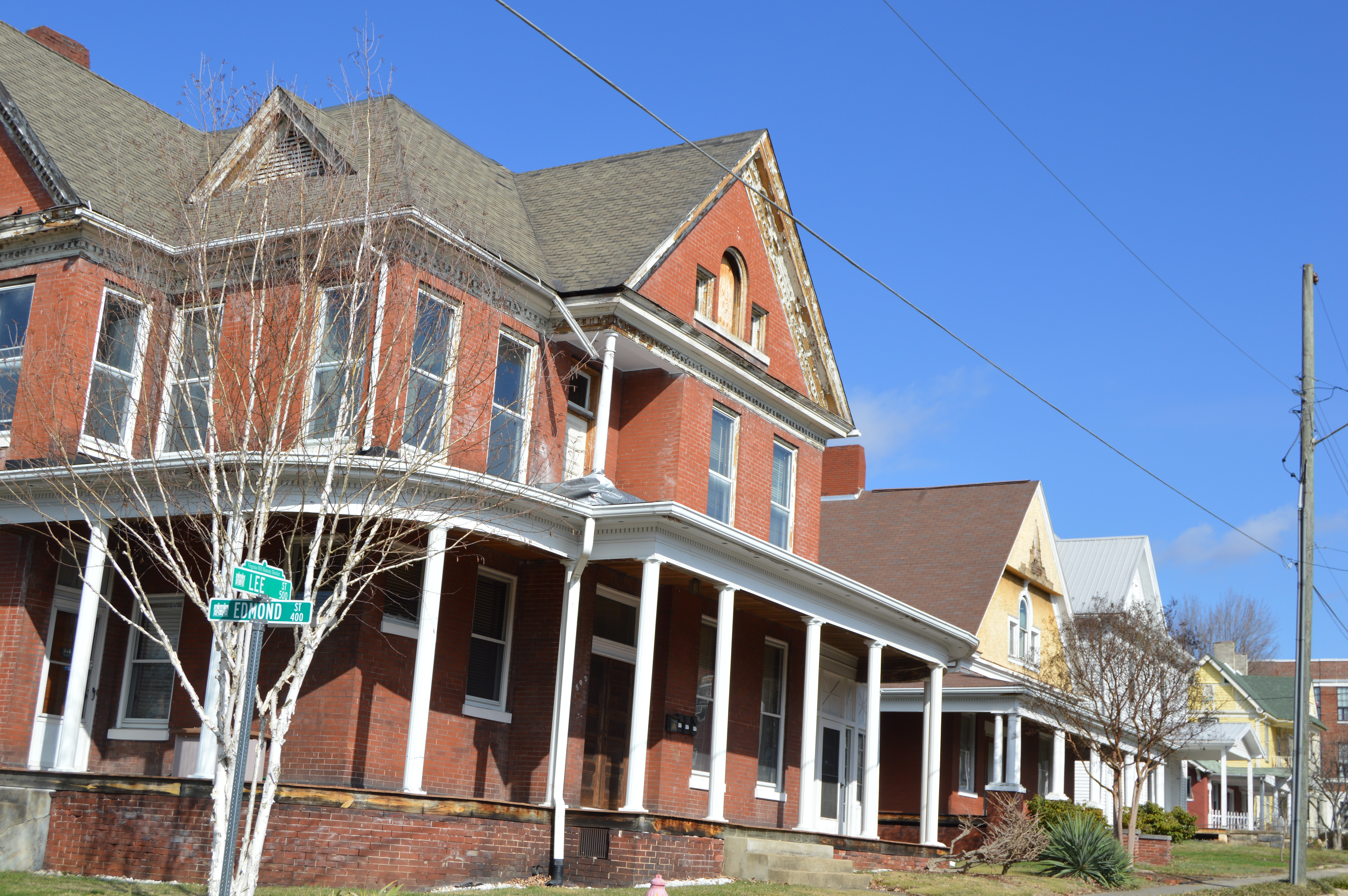
- Houses on Lee Street

- Location within Virginia Location within the United States
- Location: Sections of Moore, Lee, Russell, Clinton, Spencer, W. Mary and Buchanan Sts., Bristol, Virginia
- Coordinates: 36°36′04″N 82°11′26″W
- Area: 33.3 acres (13.5 ha)
- Built: 1871
- Architectural style: Queen Anne, Colonial Revival, et al.
- NRHP reference No.: 02001447
- VLR No.: 102-5016

Significant dates
- Added to NRHP: November 27, 2002
- Designated VLR: June 12, 2002

Virginia Hill Historic District is a national historic district located at Bristol, Virginia. The district encompasses 134 contributing buildings in a predominantly residential area of Bristol. The neighborhood developed in the late-19th and early-20th centuries, and contains primarily one- to two-story frame and brick dwellings constructed from 1868 to the 1940s. Notable buildings include the I.C. Fowler House (1868), 513 Lee Street (1882), A.W. Randolph House (c. 1890), Jean McNeil Pepper House, and Thomas Jefferson Public School (1923).

It was listed on the National Register of Historic Places in 2003.
