= Bristol Warehouse Historic District =

Historic district in Virginia, United States

- U.S. National Register of Historic Places
- U.S. Historic district
- Virginia Landmarks Register
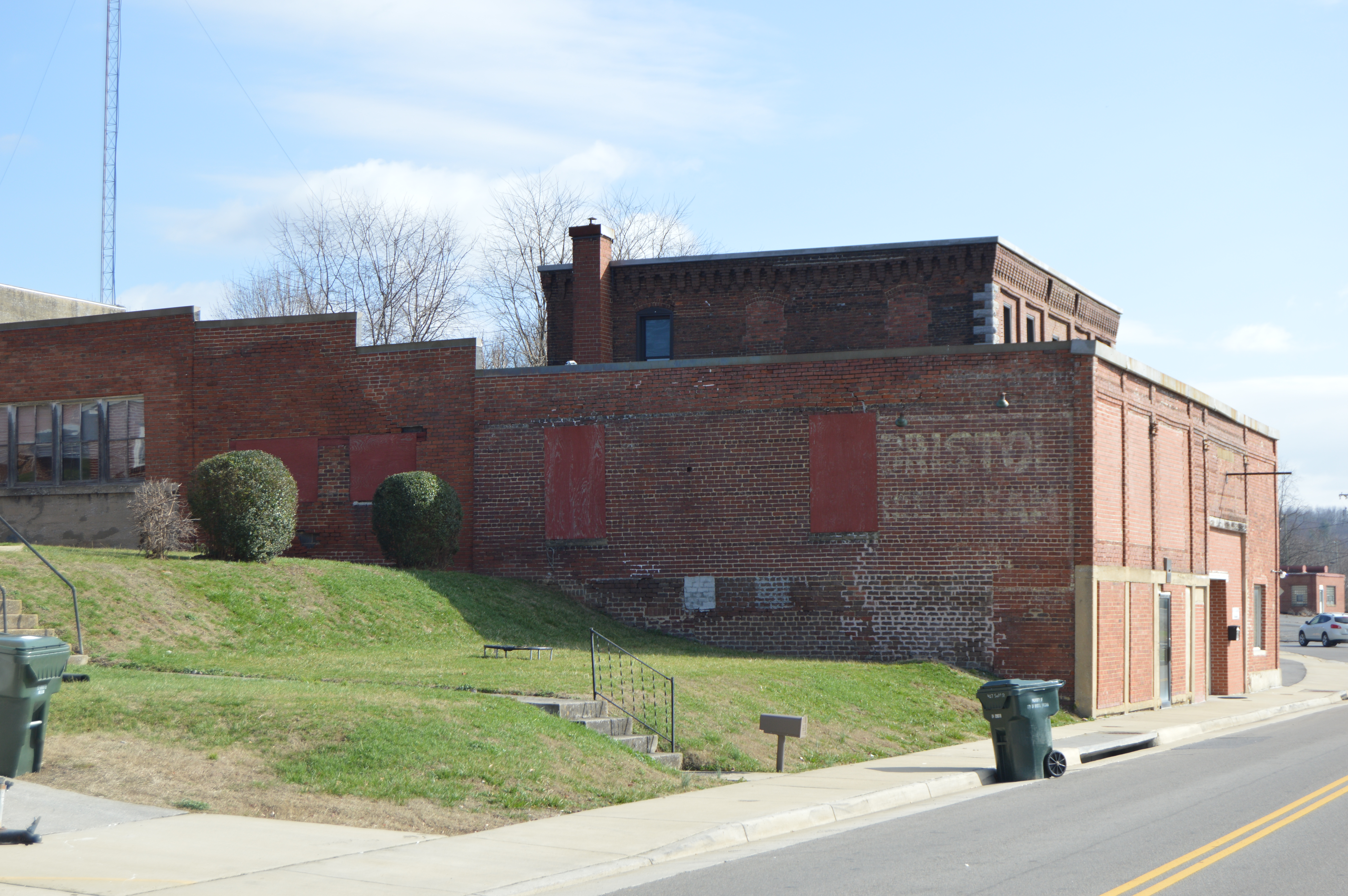
- Warehouse on Scott Street

- Location within Virginia Location within the United States
- Location: Scott & Lee Sts., Bristol, Virginia
- Coordinates: 36°35′54″N 82°10′51″W
- Area: 3 acres (1.2 ha)
- NRHP reference No.: 12000273
- VLR No.: 102-5031

Significant dates
- Added to NRHP: May 9, 2012
- Designated VLR: March 15, 2012

Bristol Warehouse Historic District is a national historic district located at Bristol, Virginia. The district encompasses five contributing buildings and one contributing structure in a regional rail, shipping and industrial center area of Bristol. The district contains a former railroad station, four warehouse buildings, and one dwelling. They are the South Atlantic & Ohio Railroad passenger station and offices (c. 1887), Bristol Warehouse Company (c. 1940), Bristol Builders Supply Company (c. 1920), parsonage for the John Wesley United Methodist Church (c. 1940), Central Warehouse building (1946), a commercial building (c. 1950), and the South Atlantic & Ohio Railroad Tracks (c. 1887).

It was listed on the National Register of Historic Places in 2012.
