= Samuel Audley Rhea =

Samuel Audley Rhea (1827–1865) was an American missionary and painter. He is known from his missionary trips to the Middle East and his book, paintings, letters and journals.

== Life ==
He was born on January 23, 1827, in Blountville, Tennessee. He would complete a degree (1847) at the University of East Tennessee. A degree would be completed (1850) at the Union Theological Seminary in New York before he was ordained a minister (1851) and being appointed as a missionary to the Middle East. His eight years in Kurdistan and Persia, would inspired his book The Tennesseean in Persia and Koordistan. Being the scenes and incidents in the life of Samuel Audley Rhea. His health would deteriorate, and upon the advice of his doctor return to the United States, recovered, and returned to his mission. He would go to Urmia, where he was at the time of his death on September 2, 1865.

== Legacy ==
Dwight Whitney Marsh wrote the book The Tennesseean in Persia and Koordistan. Being the scenes and incidents in the life of Samuel Audley Rhea about the time Rhea spent in Kurdistan and Persia.
