= Old Deery Inn =

- U.S. National Register of Historic Places
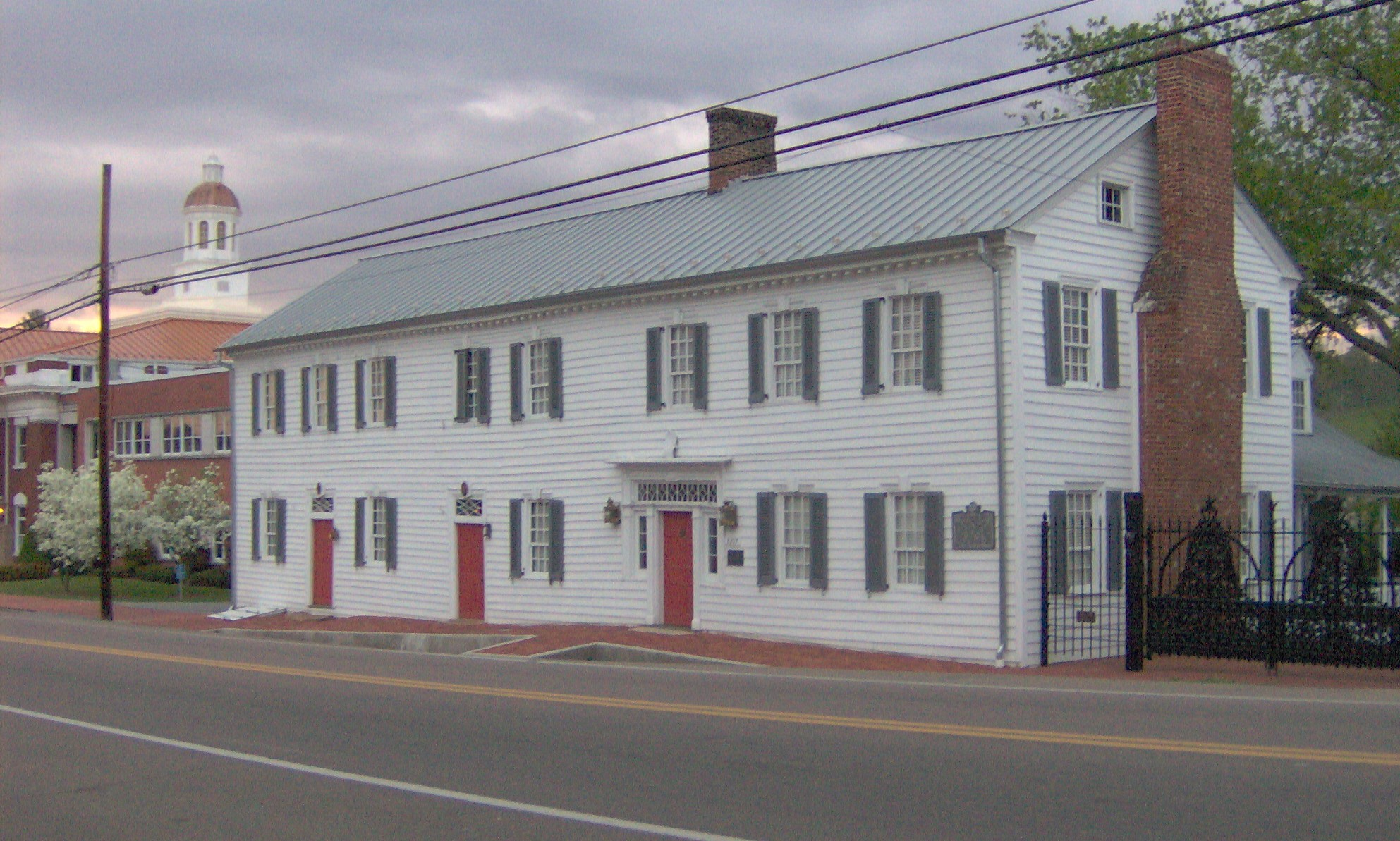

- Location within Tennessee Location within the United States
- Location: Tennessee State Route 126, Blountville, Tennessee
- Coordinates: 36°31′59″N 82°19′34″W
- Area: 5 acres (2.0 ha)
- Built: 1794
- Architectural style: Log dwelling
- NRHP reference No.: 73001838
- Added to NRHP: May 7, 1973

The Deery Inn, also known as "The Old Tavern" or "The Mansion House and Store," is a historic building on Tennessee State Route 126, formerly called Main Street in Blountville, Tennessee. It is listed on the National Register of Historic Places and is considered the "centerpiece" of the Blountville local historic district.

Deery Inn is a two-story Federal-style building with 19 rooms. The original building was a log structure, built in the 1780s or 1790s, that served travelers passing through the area on the Great Stage Road. William Deery, an Irishman from Ulster, acquired the property in 1801. He expanded the building to include a general store and tavern, with hotel rooms on the second story.

The building's 19 rooms include a large entrance hall, a gathering room, a dining room, a library, two kitchens, three bathrooms, two attics, a cellar, four bedrooms for the family, and three sleeping rooms for travelers. There are two chimneys. The front of the building has three entrance doors and 13 windows whose glass panes are arranged in a nine-over-six configuration.

Deery prospered as a businessman. In addition to the inn, he owned and operated stores in several East Tennessee communities, a stagecoach line that had eight stagecoaches and 53 teams of horses as of 1821, and a steamboat service between Knoxville and Chattanooga. He died in 1845. Notable people who are recorded as having stayed at the inn in its early history include Andrew Jackson, James K. Polk, Andrew Johnson, the Marquis de LaFayette (on his U.S. travels in 1824–25), and Louis Phillipe Orleans, King of France.

During the Civil War Gideon and Mary Elizabeth Cate leased the property and operated the inn under the name Cates' Hotel. Several surrounding buildings, including the Sullivan County courthouse, were destroyed by fire during the Battle of Blountville, but the inn survived because Cates had used bribery to get the Union and Confederate commanders to spare his inn.

Gideon and Mary Cates purchased the property after the Civil War, and owned it until the 1880s. In 1887, the inn was sold to Amanda Pearson, whose family was to own it until 1940. The property was operated as an inn until 1930. At some time during the Pearson family ownership, the inn building housed a post office.

Virginia Byars Caldwell bought the inn in 1940. She undertook to restore the property to its early 19th-century appearance. She also moved several old log structures onto the back of the property, including a smokehouse, the offices of the King Ironworks, a spring house, and an early law office.

The Old Deery Inn is now owned by the government of Sullivan County. A substantial restoration project was undertaken in 2007. The inn is managed by the Sullivan County Historical Preservation Association and is open for group tours.
