= Dwight Whitney Marsh =

American missionary and historian (1823–1896)

Dwight Whitney Marsh (November 5, 1823 – June 18, 1896) was an American missionary and historian. He was the author of an 1869 book titled The Tennessean in Persia and Koordistan, as well as an 1895 book titled Genealogy of John Marsh of Hartford, 1636.

== Early life and education ==
Born in Dalton, Massachusetts, Marsh graduated from Williams College in 1842. He then studied at Andover Theological Seminary, before completing his studies at Union Theological Seminary in 1849.

== Career ==
In 1849, Marsh sailed to Turkey. He was stationed as a missionary in Mosul for ten years. While he was there, Assyriologist Austen Henry Layard gave him several slabs he had excavated, which Marsh sent on to Williams College; the Wadsworth Atheneum in Hartford, Connecticut; the New-York Historical Society; and the Mercantile Library of St. Louis. Marsh also sent Assyrian tablets, cylinders, coins, and other antiquities to other contacts.

In 1860, Marsh returned to the United States. He served as a pastor at various churches in states including Massachusetts and Illinois. He was also a principal at a school in Rochester, New York, for five years.

== Notable works ==
The Tennessean in Persia, published in 1869, details the experiences of Samuel Audley Rhea, a missionary in Persia and Kurdistan. It provides insights into missionary activities and life in those regions during the 19th century. The book is also a source for studying the 19th century geography and culture of Kurdistan and Persia. Marsh wrote many letters to his families many of which are preserved in university archives across North America.

According to the Journal of the American Oriental Society, Marsh's 600-page work, Genealogy of John Marsh of Hartford, 1636, "holds high rank among works of its class" due to "its completeness, accuracy, literary merit, and...the simple and original method of its indexing".

== Personal life ==
Marsh returned to the United States in 1852, and moved his family back to Mosul in early 1853. He lost both his son and wife in 1859.
