= Arcadia, Tennessee =

Arcadia
- Community
- Nickname: A Reedy Creek Settlement
- Interactive map of Arcadia
- Coordinates: 36°35′N 82°26.67′W
- Country: United States
- State: Tennessee
- County: Sullivan
- Settled: 1770s

Area
  - Land: 2.69 sq mi (7.0 km^{2})
- Elevation: 1,401 ft (427 m)

Population (2020)
  - Total: 529
  - Density: 185.54/sq mi (71.64/km^{2})
- ZIP code: 37660
- Area code: 423
- GNIS feature ID: 1314593

Arcadia is an unincorporated community located in Sullivan County, Tennessee, just outside Kingsport's eastern city limits. Arcadia, originally known as the Reedy Creek Settlement, was one of the earliest settlements in present-day Tennessee. Daniel Boone's Wilderness Road ran through this community in 1775. Arcadia is listed in the National Register of Historic Places which includes the Thomas Fain Plantation. Thomas Fain named his plantation "Arcadia" to which the surrounding community became known. Arcadia is part of the Kingsport–Bristol (TN)–Bristol (VA) Metropolitan Statistical Area, which is a component of the Johnson City–Kingsport–Bristol, TN-VA Combined Statistical Area – commonly known as the Tri-Cities region.

== History ==
In 1770, the "Treaty of Lochaber" established new boundaries between the Native American lands and the settlers. Settlers then moved into what is now southwestern Virginia and Tennessee. Settlers followed the Great Wagon Road which followed the Great Indian Warpath from Pennsylvania and Maryland through the Great Appalachian Valley into Tennessee. The portion of this path that went through present-day Arcadia was later locally called Reedy Creek Road, Old Kentucky Road, and now Bloomingdale-Pike Road. This portion of the road was also part of Daniel Boone's Wilderness Road which allowed those following the Great Wagon Road to continue past present-day Bristol, through the Reedy Creek Settlement, through Moccasin Gap, and over to Cumberland Gap to settle in Kentucky.

As late as 1779, Robert Samuel Brashears was living on "the north side of the Holeston River (Holston River) & on the north branch (Timbertree Branch) of Reddy Creek." He obtained a land grant for a 300-acre (120 ha) tract of this land for his service in the American Revolution. This tract along with adjacent properties became known as the Reedy Creek Settlement, through which ran Reedy Creek Road. One of his sons, Captain Samuel Brashears, also participated in the American Revolution and the "Indian Wars of the frontier." Capt. Brashears inherited his father's land where he and his wife, Margaret, lived most of their lives.

In the mid-1800s there were five major plantation owners in Arcadia who were successful farmers, stock dealers, and financiers. One of these, Thomas Fain (1809-1898), settled here in 1836 to what was then known as the Reedy Creek Settlement. He acquired the Brashears tract of land from Samuel Brashears' heirs. Thomas Fain named his plantation "Arcadia" to which the surrounding community became known. Fain also built a store along Reedy Creek Road in front of his house which also served as the area's post office in 1846. Fain worked here as postmaster for fifty years. Mail service was moved to Kingsport in 1918. The store building no longer exists, however, the large brick home along with many auxiliary log structures, including cabins and a spring house, still exist.

"Reedy Creek Academy" was built in the early 1800s along Reedy Creek Road. Thomas Fain was a principle founder of this school. This school became "Arcadia School" in 1919 when a larger building was erected. By the 1930s, buses were carrying students to local high schools. Arcadia School was eventually closed in 1981.
