= Pearson Brick House =

Historic house in Tennessee, United States

- Formerly listed on the U.S. National Register of Historic Places
- Location within Tennessee Location within the United States
- Nearest city: Kingsport, Tennessee
- Coordinates: 36°28′55″N 82°28′21″W
- Area: 4 acres (1.6 ha)
- NRHP reference No.: 73001846

Significant dates
- Added to NRHP: April 11, 1973
- Removed from NRHP: March 20, 2017

The Pearson Brick House (also known as the Barnes House, Barnes Plantation House, or The Old Brick House on the River) is a historic structure located on the north shore of Fort Patrick Henry Lake in Sullivan County, Tennessee. The site is located near the section of the Holston River once referred to as the Great Falls. The building was added to the National Register of Historic Places in 1973, but subsequently removed in 2017.

== History ==
After immigrating from Ireland, John Beauregard Barnes and his wife, Emaline Baker Barnes, owned 2000 acres (809 hectares) of land in east Tennessee around the time of the American Civil War. In 1860, Barnes constructed the two-story house from hand-fired brick on the site.

The Barnes' slaves would be locked in the cellar of the house when Union soldiers or sympathizers were near the property. In addition, the family frequently caught runaway slaves and detained them in the cellar until their owners claimed them.

The house was inherited by the children of John Beauregard Barnes. A son, John Rice Barnes, and his wife, Elizabeth Hawk Barnes, raised their family of 12 children in the house. In addition to being a farmer, J. R. Barnes was a logger who cut and floated timber on the Holston River to Knoxville, accompanying the timber on the river in a flatboat.

The house has since had several owners including the Tennessee Valley Authority. The property is currently owned by Jim Pearson and his wife.

== Architectural details ==
The house is constructed from hand-fired brick. A chimney with decorative brickwork is located at each end of the house. The meanings of the initials on the chimneys (E.B. and L.L.) are not precisely known. The house has a total of five fireplaces.

The house contains two cellars. One of the two cellars is dirt-walled and contains a fireplace for smoking meats and chains for restraining slaves.

A rear wing with five rooms was added to the house during the occupancy by the family of John Rice Barnes. This addition was removed in 1955.
