= Solar Hill Historic District =

20th-century residential neighbourhood

- U.S. National Register of Historic Places
- U.S. Historic district
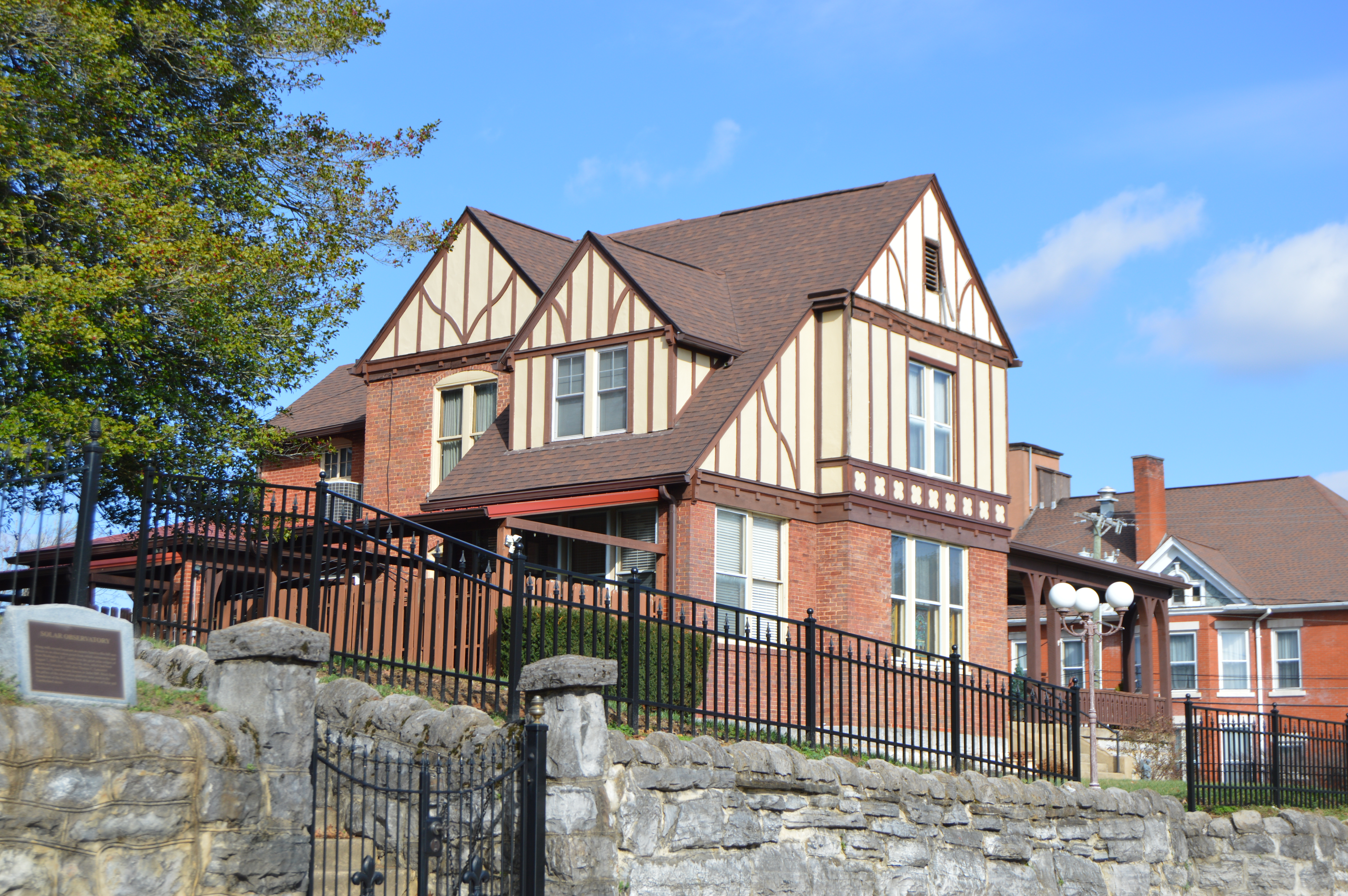
- House at Sycamore and Solar streets in 2017

- Location within Virginia Location within the United States
- Location: Roughly along Johnson, Solar, Oak, West, King, Cumberland, and Sycamore Sts., Bristol, Virginia
- Coordinates: 36°35′56″N 82°11′06″W
- Area: 27.1 acres (11.0 ha)
- Built: 1871
- Architectural style: Queen Anne, Colonial Revival, et al.
- NRHP reference No.: 01000703
- Added to NRHP: July 5, 2001

The Solar Hill Historic District encompasses an architecturally significant early 20th century residential neighborhood near the center of Bristol, Virginia. The district covers an area of about 27 acres (11 ha), bounded on the north by the Norfolk and Southern Railroad and Scott Street, on the west by West Street, on the east by Johnson Street, and on the south by Cumberland Street. Solar Hill is a knob of land overlooking the downtown area, and is where the house of the King family, one the area's early settlers, is located. The Kings owned most of what is now Bristol until 1852, when the central portion of the town was laid out, but retained ownership of the Solar Hill area until after the American Civil War. The hill became known as "Solar Hill" when it was used as an official observation point of a solar eclipse in 1869.

Solar Hill was sold off for development in 1871, but significant development did not begin until 1890. Between 1890 and the 1920s the area was built up with high quality Colonial Revival and American Craftsman style homes, and had a reputation as the fashionable residential area for Bristol's elite. Many of these fine larger homes have since that period been divided into apartments, or been adapted for use by businesses.

The district was listed on the National Register of Historic Places in 2001; it is incorrectly classified as being in Washington County.

== See also ==
- National Register of Historic Places listings in Bristol, Virginia
