= Blountville, Tennessee =

Blountville
- CDP
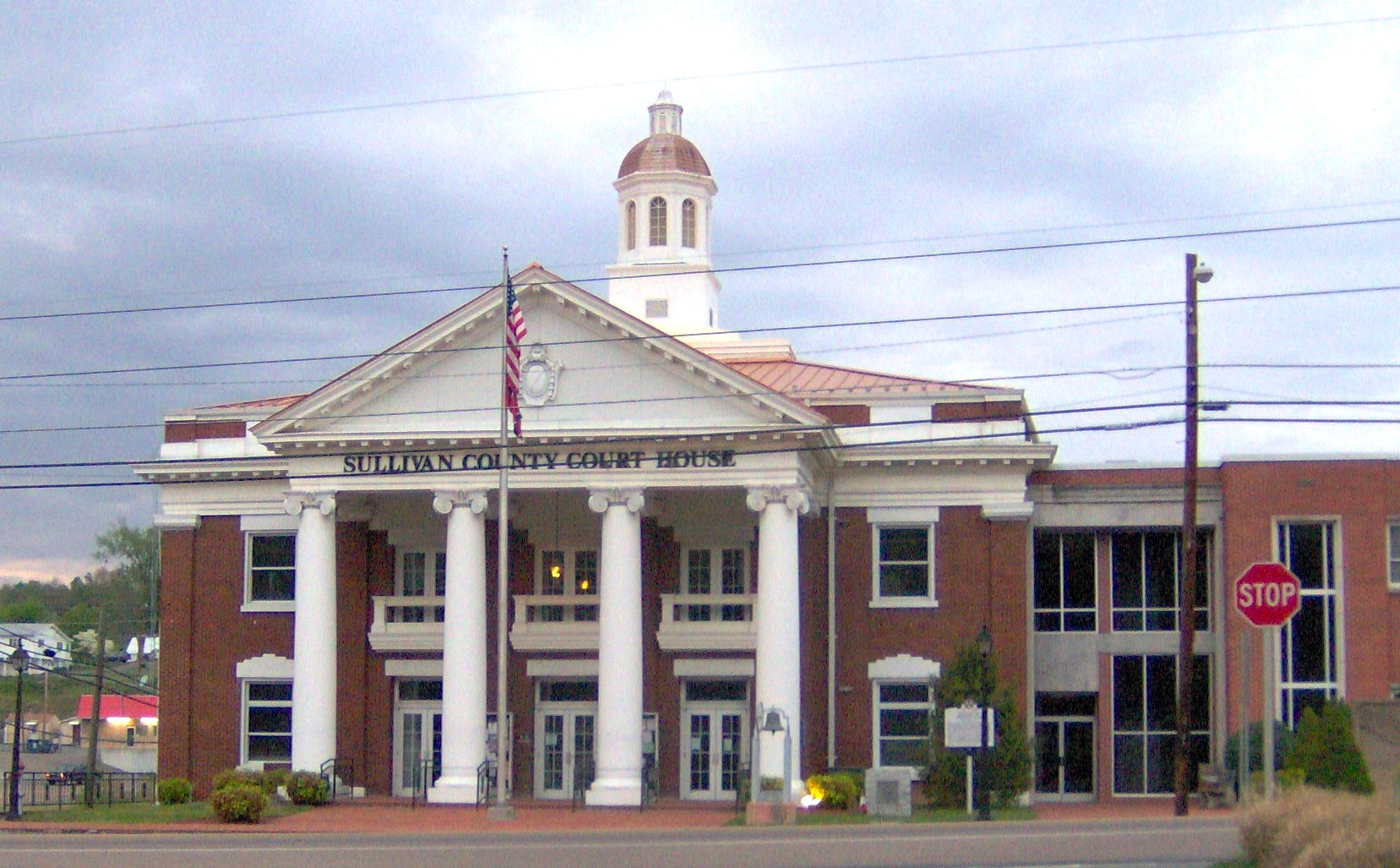
- Sullivan County Courthouse in Blountville

- Location of Blountville, Tennessee
- Coordinates: 36°32′0″N 82°19′35″W
- Country: United States
- State: Tennessee
- County: Sullivan
- Founded: 1795
- Named after: William Blount

Area
  - Total: 4.93 sq mi (12.78 km^{2})
  - Land: 4.93 sq mi (12.78 km^{2})
  - Water: 0 sq mi (0.00 km^{2})
- Elevation: 1,539 ft (469 m)

Population (2020)
  - Total: 3,120
  - Density: 632.3/sq mi (244.12/km^{2})
- Time zone: UTC-5 (Eastern (EST))
  - Summer (DST): UTC-4 (EDT)
- ZIP code: 37617
- Area codes: 423 and 729
- FIPS code: 47-06740
- GNIS feature ID: 1305297

Blountville is a census-designated place (CDP) in and the county seat of Sullivan County, Tennessee. The population was 3,074 at the 2010 census and 3,120 at the 2020 census. It is the only Tennessee county seat not to be an incorporated city or town.

Blountville is part of the Kingsport–Bristol–Bristol metropolitan area, which is a component of the Johnson City-Kingsport-Bristol, TN-VA Combined Statistical Area, commonly known as the "Tri-Cities" region.

== History ==
The area that is now Blountville is thought to have been the location of a longhunter fort prior to its permanent settlement. The site of the town was part of a tract of about 600 acres (240 ha) of land bought by James Brigham in 1782. In 1792 Brigham gave 30 acres (12 ha) to Sullivan County for use as a county seat and established a hotel nearby. Blountville was laid off as a town and established as the county seat in 1795. The county's first courthouse and jail was a log structure. In 1825 it was replaced with a brick building. By 1830, the settlement had 209 residents, two churches, six stores, two taverns, ten mechanics, one doctor, and one lawyer.

On the afternoon of September 22, 1863, during the Civil War, the town was the scene of the four-hour-long Battle of Blountville. During a major expedition into East Tennessee and Southwest Virginia, a Union Army unit attacked Confederate troops at Blountville. The town was shelled in the fighting and the courthouse was burned in the battle, which forced the Confederates to withdraw. The courthouse was rebuilt within the old walls in 1866. The current courthouse dates from a major construction that was done in 1920; it also includes additions made in 1958.

If Blountville were an incorporated town, it would qualify as the second oldest municipality in Tennessee (second only to Jonesborough); however, it was unincorporated at one point in order to avoid having redundant government services for such a small area and population. This unique status has led to some odd results, including a lawsuit in which it was ruled that neighboring Kingsport was not allowed to annex areas of Sullivan County within a defined distance of the courthouse, in effect ensuring that the county seat could not be annexed out of existence.

=== Historic district ===
Several of Blountville's surviving 18th and 19th century buildings are included in an historic district listed on the National Register of Historic Places. The Deery Inn was built in the late 1700s and consists of three buildings: a two-story log home, a three-story stone house and a two-story frame building. All buildings are next to each other and attached. The home is a private residence.

== Geography ==
Blountville is located at 36°32′0″N 82°19′35″W (36.533312, -82.326474).

According to the United States Census Bureau, the CDP has a total area of 4.9 square miles (13 km^{2}), all land.

== Demographics ==
Historical population
Census	Pop.	Note	%±
2000	2,959		—
2010	3,074		3.9%
2020	3,120		1.5%
U.S. Decennial Census

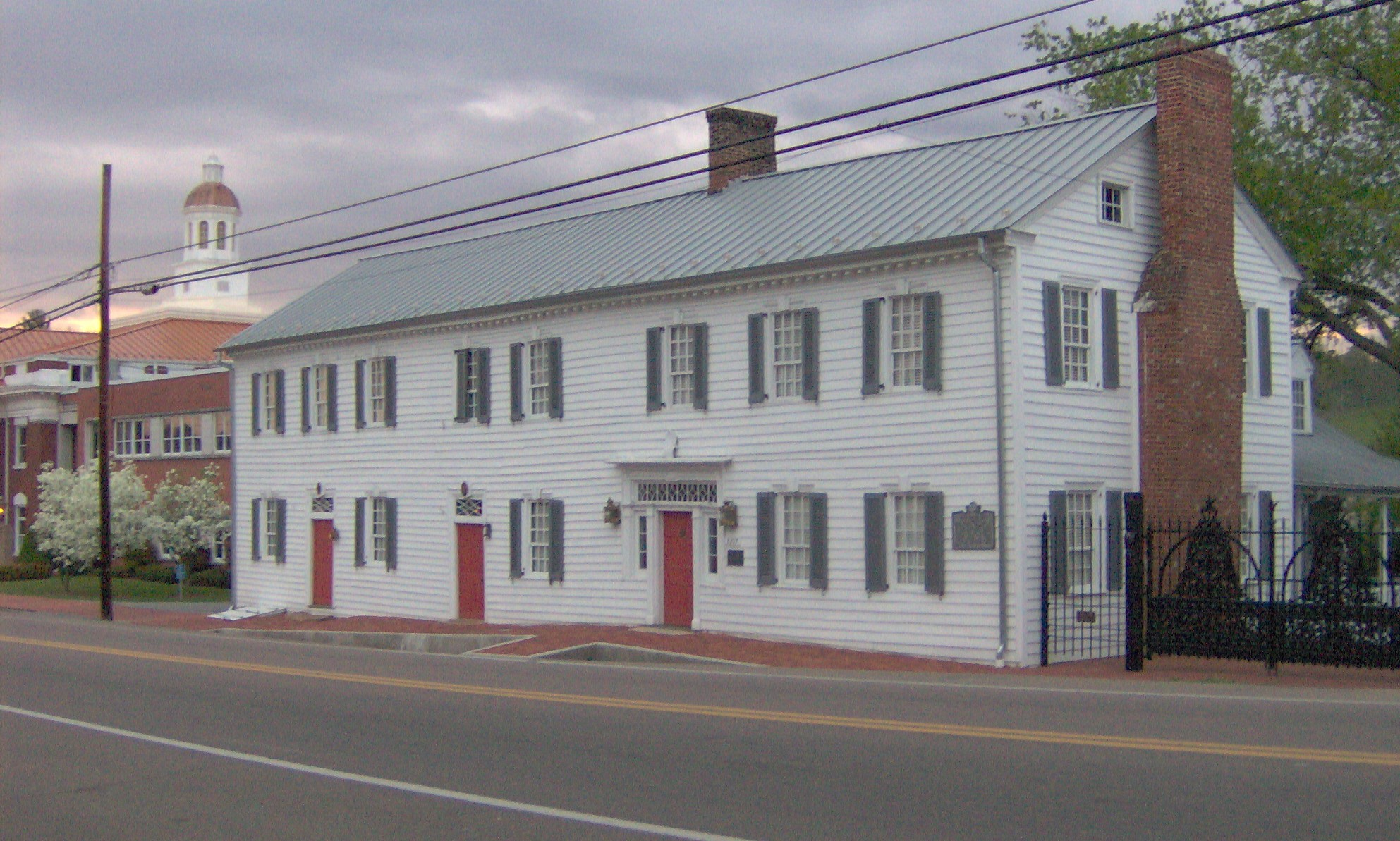
The Deery Inn in Blountville, built circa 1785–1801

=== 2020 census ===
As of the 2020 census, Blountville had a population of 3,120. There were 683 families residing in the CDP. The median age was 42.0 years. 14.2% of residents were under the age of 18 and 20.2% of residents were 65 years of age or older. For every 100 females there were 116.2 males, and for every 100 females age 18 and over there were 119.9 males age 18 and over.

71.7% of residents lived in urban areas, while 28.3% lived in rural areas.

There were 1,079 households in Blountville, of which 21.6% had children under the age of 18 living in them. Of all households, 48.5% were married-couple households, 17.1% were households with a male householder and no spouse or partner present, and 29.1% were households with a female householder and no spouse or partner present. About 31.3% of all households were made up of individuals and 16.3% had someone living alone who was 65 years of age or older.

There were 1,165 housing units, of which 7.4% were vacant. The homeowner vacancy rate was 0.5% and the rental vacancy rate was 8.3%.

Blountville racial composition
Race	Number	Percentage
White (non-Hispanic)	2,921	93.62%
Black or African American (non-Hispanic)	66	2.12%
Native American	3	0.1%
Asian	12	0.38%
Other/Mixed	77	2.47%
Hispanic or Latino	41	1.31%

=== 2000 census ===
As of the census of 2000, there were 2,959 people, 1,060 households, and 763 families residing in the CDP. The population density was 518.0 inhabitants per square mile (200.0/km^{2}). There were 1,134 housing units at an average density of 198.5 per square mile (76.6/km^{2}). The racial makeup of the CDP was 98.01% White, 1.32% African American, 0.17% Native American, 0.20% Asian, 0.03% Pacific Islander, 0.07% from other races, and 0.20% from two or more races. Hispanic or Latino of any race were 0.88% of the population.

There were 1,060 households, out of which 25.8% had children under the age of 18 living with them, 60.0% were married couples living together, 8.8% had a female householder with no husband present, and 28.0% were non-families. 25.8% of all households were made up of individuals, and 11.3% had someone living alone who was 65 years of age or older. The average household size was 2.36 and the average family size was 2.80.

In the CDP, the population was spread out, with 16.9% under the age of 18, 10.0% from 18 to 24, 35.3% from 25 to 44, 24.9% from 45 to 64, and 12.9% who were 65 years of age or older. The median age was 38 years. For every 100 females, there were 123.0 males. For every 100 females age 18 and over, there were 127.6 males.

The median income for a household in the CDP was $37,609, and the median income for a family was $41,594. Males had a median income of $31,842 versus $18,163 for females. The per capita income for the CDP was $16,173. About 3.0% of families and 4.8% of the population were below the poverty line, including 1.4% of those under age 18 and 8.1% of those age 65 or over.

== Motocross ==
On June 1, 2013, the Lucas Oil Pro Motocross Championship was held at Muddy Creek Raceway in Blountville. This was the first time the Pro Motocross Championship was held in the South in 15 years. The 2013 Built Ford Tough Tennessee National was the first ever Pro National held at Muddy Creek Raceway.

== Education ==
Blountville has five public schools. The three elementary schools are Holston, Indian Springs, and Central Heights Elementary School. The new middle school is Sullivan Central Middle School. High school students attend the recently opened West Ridge High School. The community is also the site of Northeast State Community College.

Elementary and middle school students formerly attended the Blountville Elementary & Middle School just outside the downtown area until closing in May 2021 and is the first time in 200 years that no school has operated in the community

== Transportation ==
Blountville is the site of the Tri-Cities Regional Airport, located in Blountville primarily because of its central location between Johnson City, Kingsport, Bristol, TN/VA. NASCAR champion Alan Kulwicki died in an airplane crash near Blountville.

== Recreation ==
Blountville's historic district includes two 18th-century buildings— the Old Deery Inn and the Anderson Townhouse— and several notable 19th-century structures. Appalachian Caverns and Boone Lake are located just south of Blountville.

== Notable people ==
- Lannie Haynes Martin (1874–1938), poet and editor
- Ron Ramsey, 49th Lieutenant Governor of Tennessee.
- Samuel Audley Rhea, 19th century priest and writer
