= Bristol Virginia–Tennessee slogan sign =

Sign in Virginia and Tennessee, US

- U.S. National Register of Historic Places
- Virginia Landmarks Register
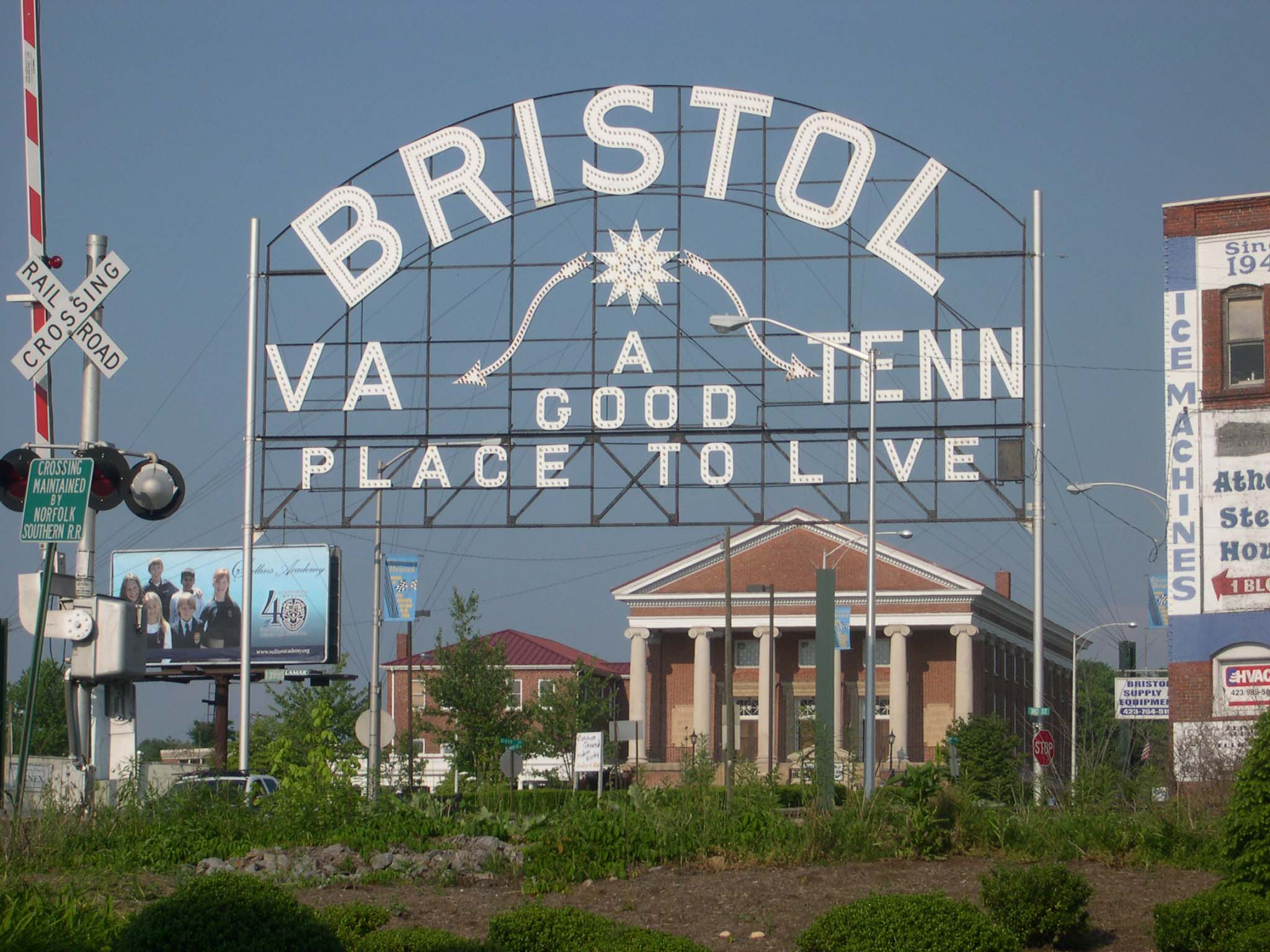
- Bristol Virginia–Tennessee slogan sign, May 2006

- Location within Virginia Location within the United States
- Location: E. State St. Bristol, Tennessee, and Bristol, Virginia
- Coordinates: 36°35′41.82″N 82°10′46.85″W
- Area: less than one acre
- Built: 1910
- NRHP reference No.: 88001568
- VLR No.: 102-0002

Significant dates
- Added to NRHP: September 8, 1988
- Designated VLR: June 21, 2008

The Bristol Virginia–Tennessee slogan sign is a landmark in the twin cities of Bristol, Virginia, and Bristol, Tennessee, United States. The sign is positioned over State Street, a roadway along the border separating the two states. Although the landmark is technically located in both Tennessee and Virginia, the National Register considers the location as Tennessee.

== History ==
In 1901, the center of Main Street was officially designated as the state line separating Tennessee and Virginia by the United States Congress. The street has since been renamed State Street.

According to the Bristol Historical Association's booklet The Historical Bristol Sign, the Bristol Gas and Electric Company donated and erected the sign atop a hardware store in 1910 to advertise the city. The sign originally contained the lighted slogan PUSH! - THAT'S BRISTOL referring to the hopes of continued growth and future prosperity for the two cities. In 1915, the sign was moved to its current location. In 1921, a contest was held in order to select a new slogan. The winning slogan, A GOOD PLACE TO LIVE, has remained the slogan ever since. The sign is featured at the beginning of a 2016 commercial for GEICO insurance.

It was listed on the National Register of Historic Places in 1988.

== Technical details ==
The lighted sign currently contains 1,332 light bulbs.
