= Battle of Blountville =

Battle of the American Civil War

Coordinates: 36.533333°N 82.326389°W

- Part of the American Civil War
Date	September 22, 1863
Location	Blountville, Sullivan County, Tennessee
Result	Union victory

Belligerents
United States (Union)	CSA (Confederacy)

Commanders and leaders
John W. Foster	James E. Carter

Units involved
1 brigade	1,200

Casualties and losses
27	165

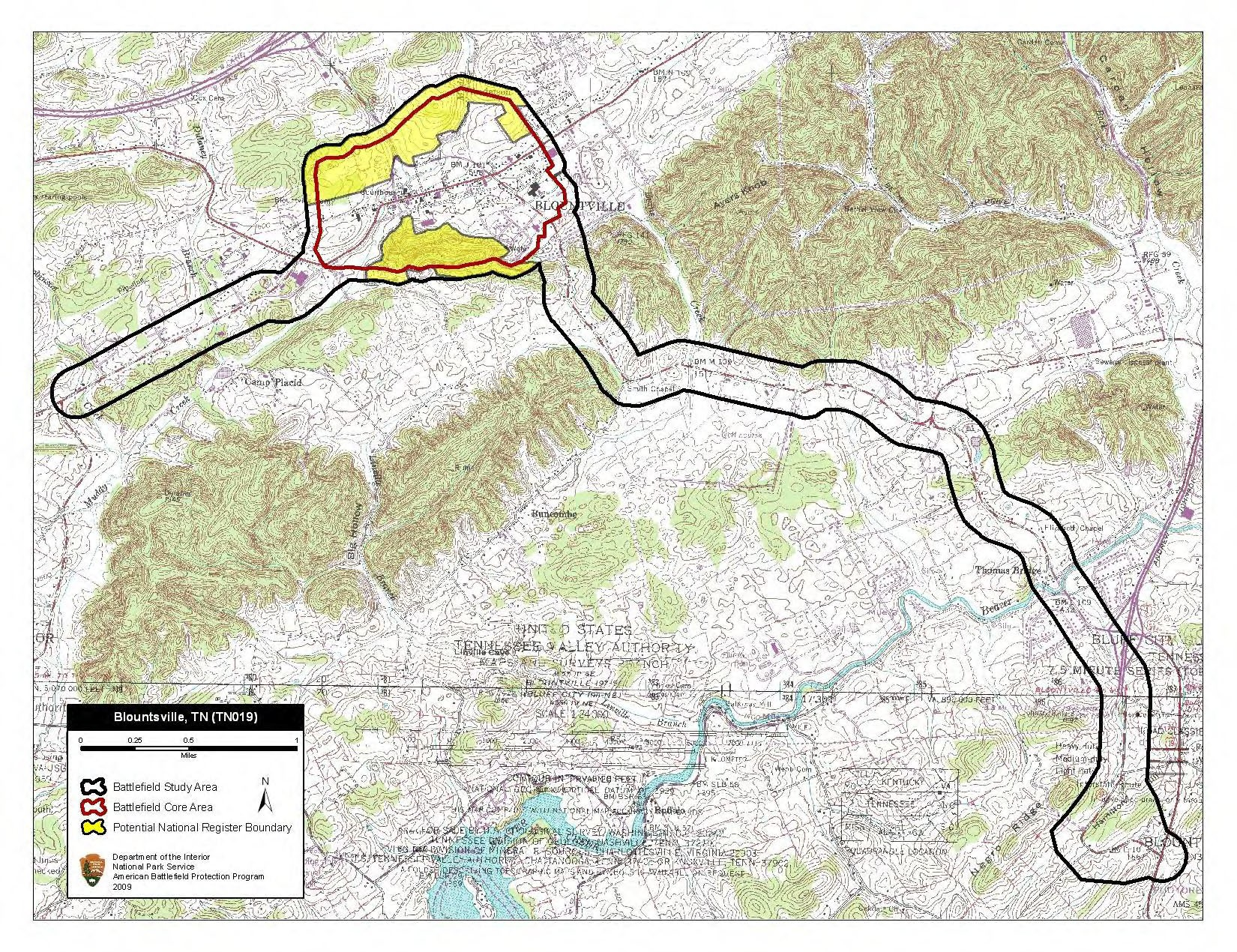
Map of Blountsville Battlefield core and study areas by the American Battlefield Protection Program.

The Battle of Blountville, sometimes (incorrectly) spelled Battle of Blountsville, took place during the American Civil War, occurring on September 22, 1863, in Sullivan County, Tennessee.

== Battle ==
The battle occurred during a Union expedition into East Tennessee led by Major General Ambrose Burnside, commander of the Department of the Ohio, with the objective of clearing the roads and gaps to Virginia and securing the saltworks in southwestern Virginia. On September 22, Union Col. John W. Foster, with his cavalry and artillery, engaged Col. James E. Carter and his troops at Blountville. Foster attacked at noon and in the four-hour battle shelled the town and initiated a flanking movement, compelling the Confederates to withdraw. Blountville was the initial step in the Union’s attempt to force Confederate Maj. Gen. Sam Jones and his command to retire from East Tennessee.

The Sullivan County courthouse in Blountville was gutted by a fire that broke out during the shelling. It was rebuilt in 1866.
