= Bristol, Virginia =

City in Virginia, US

- Independent city
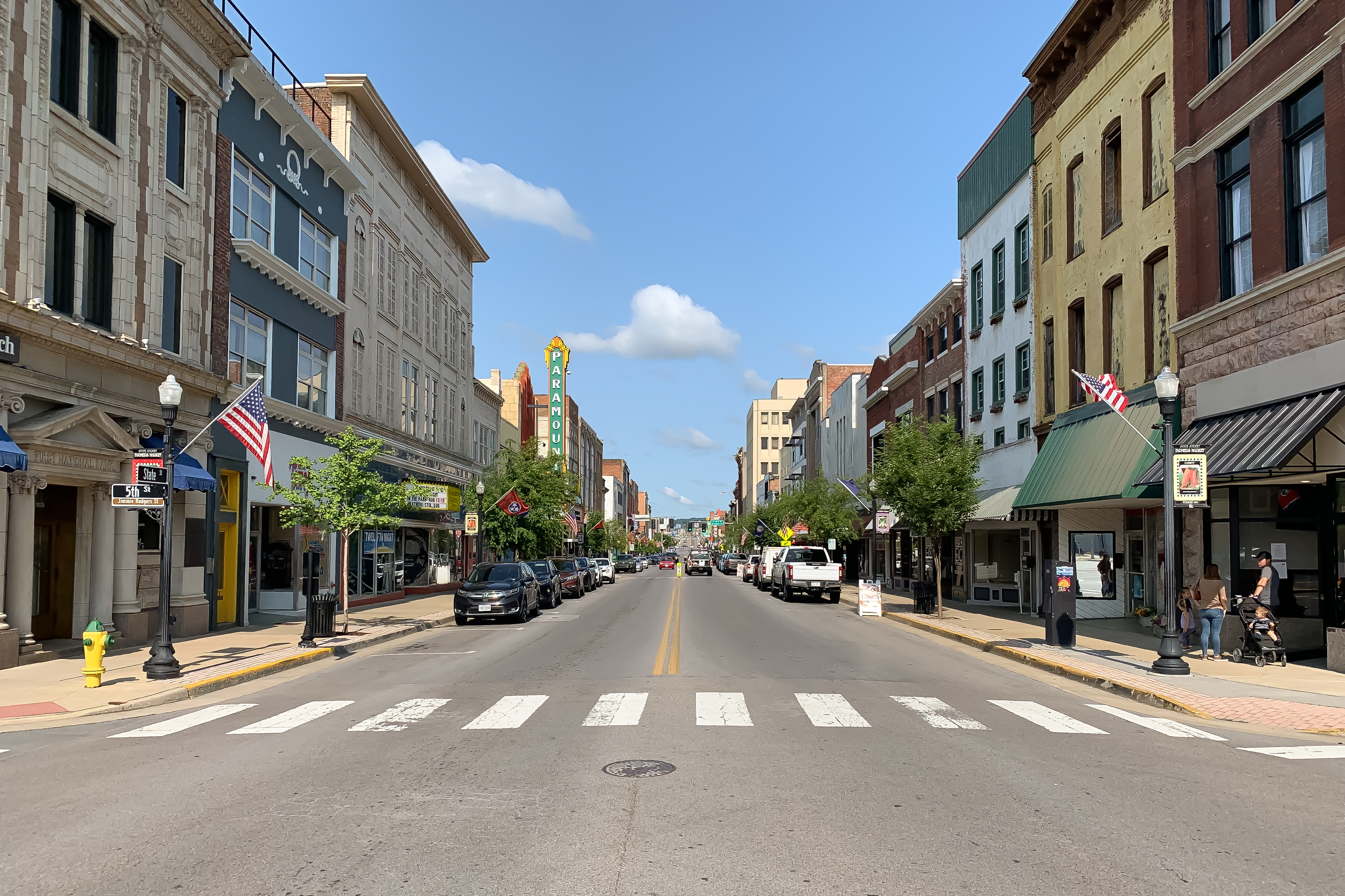
- State Street in downtown Bristol, Tennessee (left) and Bristol, Virginia (right)

- Seal Logo
- Nickname: The Birthplace of Country Music
- Motto: A Good Place to Live
- Coordinates: 36°36′N 82°11′W
- Country: United States
- State: Virginia
- County: Independent city
- Established: 1856

Government
  - Type: Council-manager
  - Mayor: Jake Holmes (I)
  - Vice Mayor: Neal Osborne
  - City Manager: Tamrya Spradlin

Area
  - Total: 13.00 sq mi (33.66 km^{2})
  - Land: 12.87 sq mi (33.34 km^{2})
  - Water: 0.12 sq mi (0.32 km^{2})
- Elevation: 1,680 ft (512 m)

Population (2020)
  - Total: 17,219
  - Estimate (2025): 16,418 ▼
  - Density: 1,338/sq mi (516.5/km^{2})
- Time zone: UTC−5 (Eastern)
  - Summer (DST): UTC−4 (EDT)
- ZIP code: 24201, 24202
- Area code: 276
- FIPS code: 51-09816
- GNIS feature ID: 1492633
- Website: www.bristolva.gov

Bristol is an independent city in Virginia, United States. As of the 2020 census, the population was 17,219. It is the twin city of Bristol, Tennessee, just across the state line, which runs down the middle of its main street, State Street. As an independent city, Bristol is not part of any county, but it is adjacent to Washington County, Virginia. It is a principal city in the Kingsport–Bristol metropolitan area, which had a population of 307,614 in 2020. The metro area is a component of the larger Tri-Cities region of Tennessee and Virginia, with a population of 508,260 in 2020.

== History ==
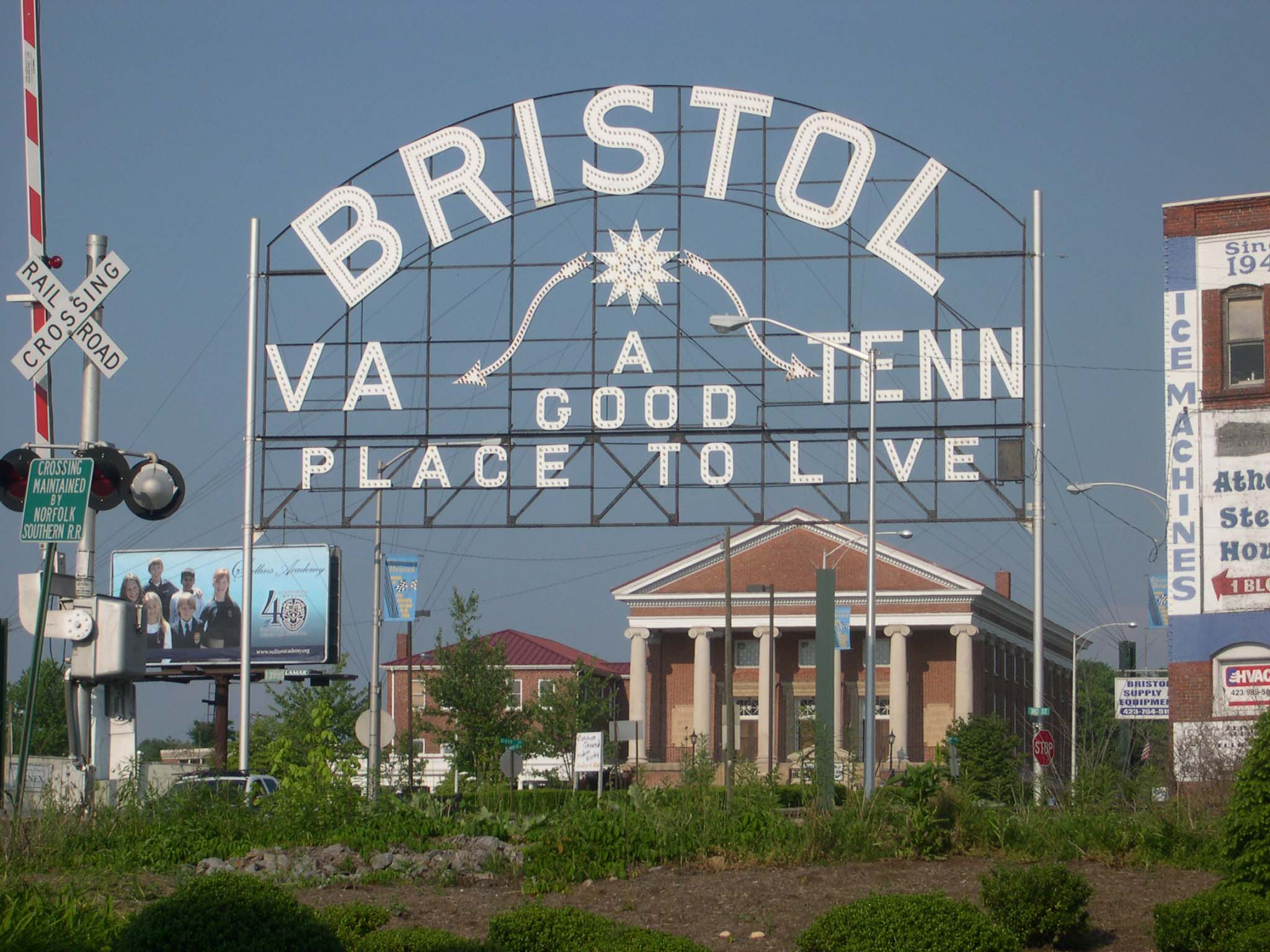
Bristol Virginia–Tennessee slogan sign

Evan Shelby first appeared in what is now the Bristol area around 1765. In 1766, Shelby moved his family and settled at a place called Big Camp Meet (now Bristol, Tennessee/Virginia). It is said that Cherokee Indians once inhabited the area and the Indian village was named, according to legend, because numerous deer and buffalo met here to feast in the canebrakes. Shelby renamed the site Sapling Grove (which would later be changed to Bristol). In 1774, Shelby erected a fort on a hill overlooking what is now downtown Bristol. It was an important stopping-off place for notables such as Daniel Boone and George Rogers Clark, as well as hundreds of pioneers en route to the interior of the developing nation. This fort, known as Shelby's Station was actually a combination trading post, way station, and stockade.

By the mid-nineteenth century, when surveyors projected a junction of two railroad lines at the Virginia-Tennessee state line, Reverend James King conveyed much of his acreage to his son-in-law, Joseph R. Anderson. Anderson laid out the original town of Bristol, Tennessee/Virginia and building began in 1853.

Samuel Goodson, who owned land that adjoined the original town of Bristol TN/VA at its northern boundary (Beaver Creek was the dividing line), started a development known as Goodsonville. Anderson was unable to incorporate Bristol across the state lines of Tennessee and Virginia. In 1856, Goodsonville and the original Bristol, Virginia were merged to form the composite town of Goodson, Virginia.

Incorporation for Bristol, Tennessee and Goodson, Virginia occurred in 1856. The Virginia and Tennessee Railroads reached the cities in the late summer of 1856. Due to having two different railroads companies, two depots served the cities; one in Bristol, Tenn. and the other in Goodson, Va. However, the depot located in Goodson continued to be referred to as Bristol, Virginia. In 1890, the town of Goodson, Virginia once again took the name Bristol when it gained independent city status.

The Grove, Solar Hill Historic District, and Walnut Grove are listed on the National Register of Historic Places.

== Geography ==
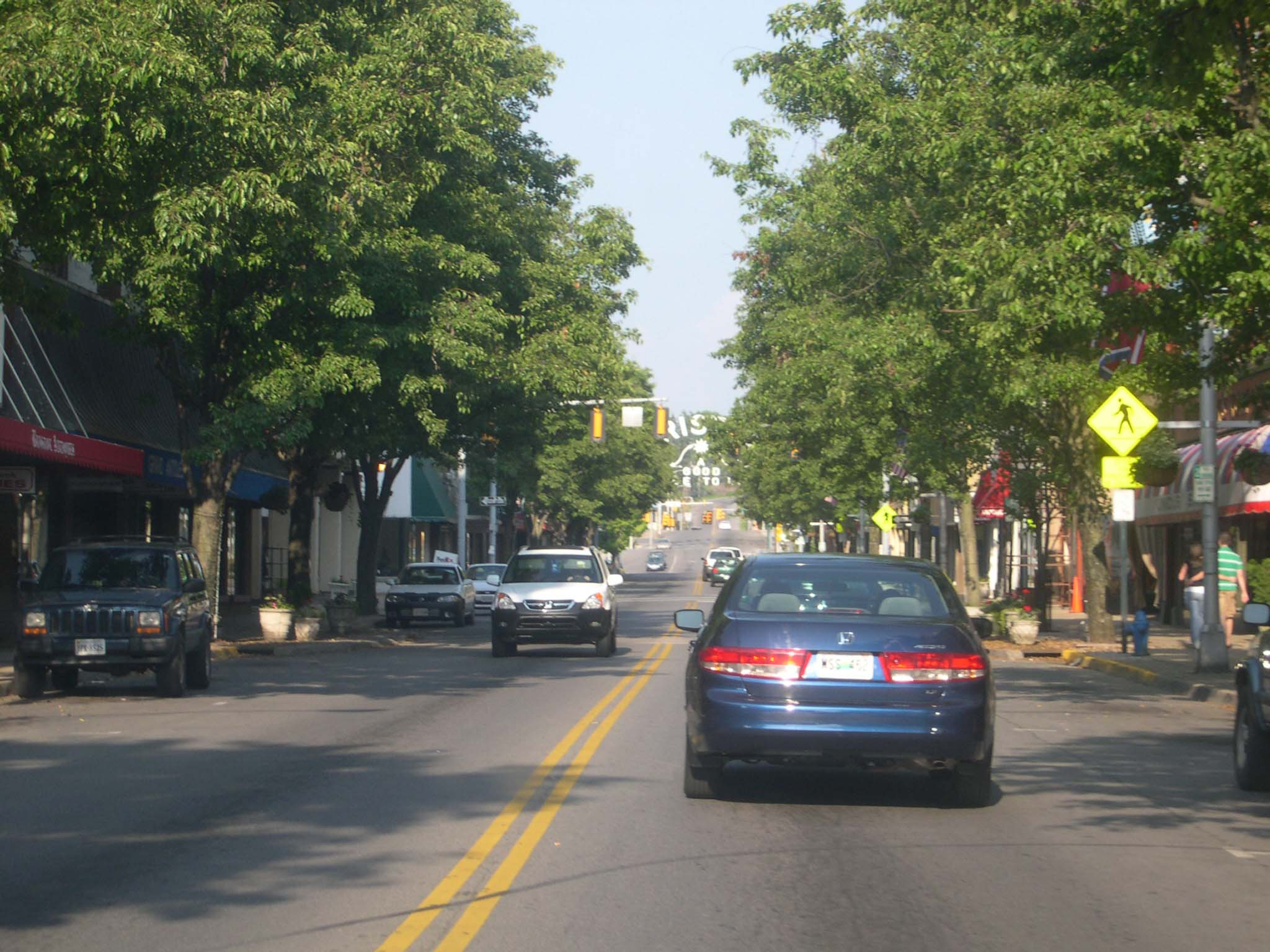
State Street separates Virginia (left) and Tennessee (right).

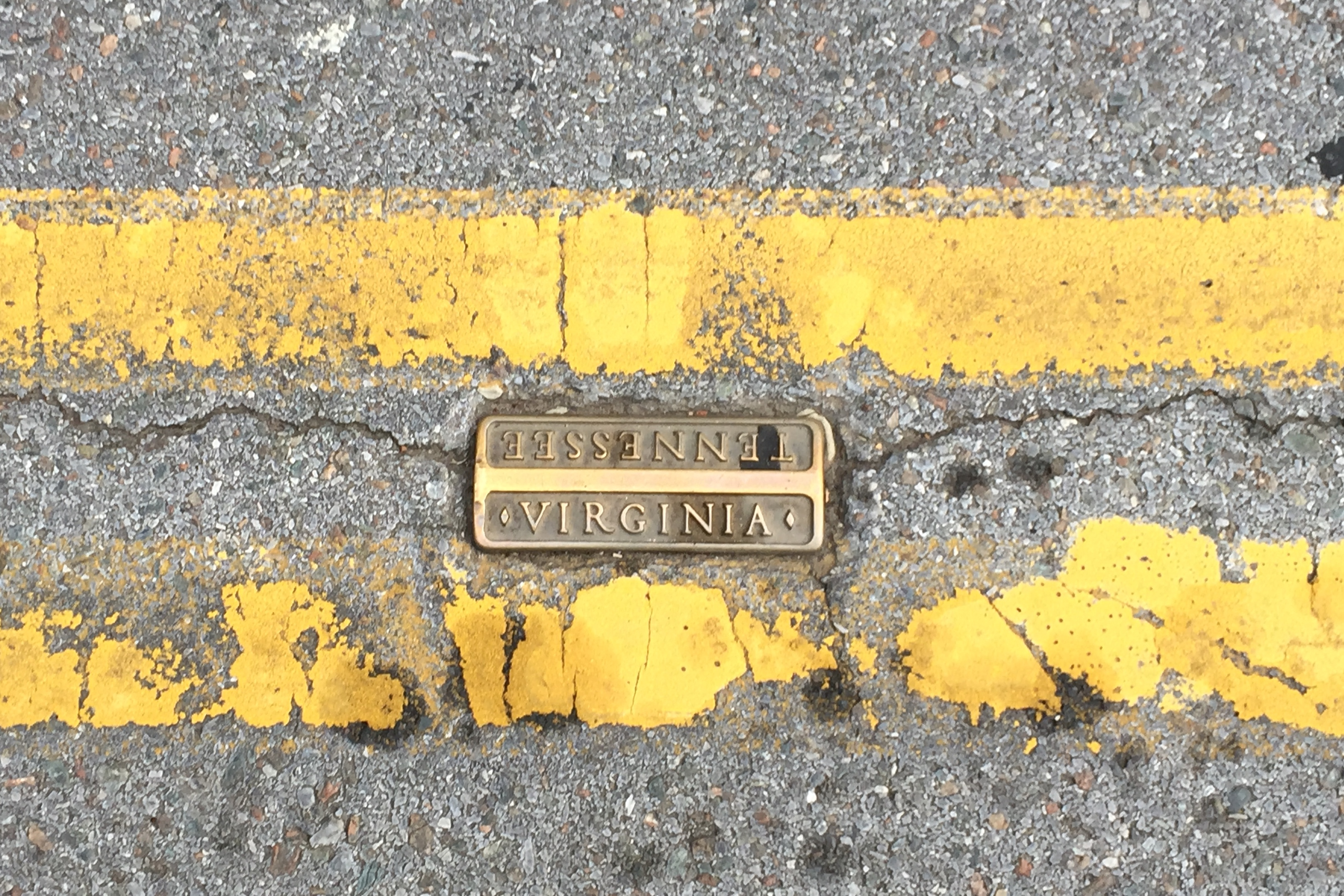
Double yellow line on State Street, separating Virginia from Tennessee with a bronze marker embedded in pavement.

Bristol is in southwestern Virginia. It is bordered to the west, north, and east by Washington County, Virginia, and to the south by the city of Bristol in Sullivan County, Tennessee.

According to the United States Census Bureau, the city has a total area of 13.2 square miles (34.1 km^{2}), of which 13.0 square miles (33.7 km^{2}) is land and 0.15 square miles (0.4 km^{2}), or 1.07%, is water. Little Creek and Beaver Creek flow south through the city; Little Creek flows into Beaver Creek two blocks south of the state line in Tennessee. Beaver Creek is a tributary of the South Fork Holston River.

The city is served by Interstates 81 and 381, and by U.S. Routes 11, 19, 58 and 421. I-81 leads northeast 149 miles (240 km) to Roanoke, Virginia, and southwest 113 miles (182 km) to Knoxville, Tennessee. Interstate 381 (I-381) is a spur from Interstate 81 that provides access to Bristol, Virginia, United States. It runs for 1.7 miles (2.7 kilometers) from the intersection of Commonwealth Avenue (State Route 381) and Keys/Church Streets in Bristol at exit 0 north to Interstate 81. The I-81 interchange, the only one on I-381, is signed as exits 1A (I-81 north) and 1B (I-81 south). US 11 and US 19, running parallel to I-81, lead northeast 15 miles (24 km) to Abingdon, Virginia. US 11 splits into routes 11W and 11E in Bristol; US 11W leads west-southwest 23 miles (37 km) to Kingsport, Tennessee, while US 11E and US 19 lead south-southwest 25 miles (40 km) to Johnson City, Tennessee. US 58 runs with I-81 northeast for 17 miles (27 km) before splitting off to the east just beyond Abingdon; US 58 and 421 together lead west 27 miles (43 km) to Weber City, Virginia. US 421 leads southeast 33 miles (53 km) to Mountain City, Tennessee.

=== Climate ===
According to the Köppen climate classification, Bristol has a marine west coast climate abbreviated as Cfb.

Climate data for Bristol-Johnson City Area (1991-2020 normals)
Month	Jan	Feb	Mar	Apr	May	Jun	Jul	Aug	Sep	Oct	Nov	Dec	Year
Mean daily maximum °F (°C)	46.5 (8.1)	50.9 (10.5)	59.4 (15.2)	69.4 (20.8)	77.1 (25.1)	83.8 (28.8)	86.4 (30.2)	85.8 (29.9)	80.7 (27.1)	70.2 (21.2)	58.7 (14.8)	49.5 (9.7)	68.2 (20.1)
Daily mean °F (°C)	36.4 (2.4)	40.0 (4.4)	47.4 (8.6)	56.4 (13.6)	64.7 (18.2)	72.3 (22.4)	75.6 (24.2)	74.5 (23.6)	68.6 (20.3)	57.3 (14.1)	46.4 (8.0)	39.3 (4.1)	56.6 (13.7)
Mean daily minimum °F (°C)	26.3 (−3.2)	29.2 (−1.6)	35.4 (1.9)	43.3 (6.3)	52.3 (11.3)	60.7 (15.9)	64.7 (18.2)	63.2 (17.3)	56.4 (13.6)	44.3 (6.8)	34.2 (1.2)	29.2 (−1.6)	44.9 (7.2)
Average precipitation inches (mm)	3.65 (93)	3.81 (97)	3.96 (101)	3.79 (96)	3.82 (97)	3.92 (100)	5 (130)	3.76 (96)	2.84 (72)	2.52 (64)	3.14 (80)	3.76 (96)	43.97 (1,122)
Source: NOAA

== Demographics ==
Historical population
Census	Pop.	Note	%±
1880	1,562		—
1890	2,902		85.8%
1900	4,579		57.8%
1910	6,247		36.4%
1920	6,729		7.7%
1930	8,840		31.4%
1940	9,768		10.5%
1950	15,954		63.3%
1960	17,144		7.5%
1970	14,857		−13.3%
1980	19,042		28.2%
1990	18,426		−3.2%
2000	17,367		−5.7%
2010	17,835		2.7%
2020	17,219		−3.5%
2025 (est.)	16,418	▼	−4.7%
U.S. Decennial Census; 1790-1960 1900-1990; 1990-2000 2010 2020

=== Racial and ethnic composition ===
Bristol city, Virginia – Racial and ethnic composition Note: the US Census treats Hispanic/Latino as an ethnic category. This table excludes Latinos from the racial categories and assigns them to a separate category. Hispanics/Latinos may be of any race.
Race / Ethnicity (NH = Non-Hispanic)	Pop 1980	Pop 1990	Pop 2000	Pop 2010	Pop 2020	% 1980	% 1990	% 2000	% 2010	% 2020
White alone (NH)	17,732	17,194	15,964	16,099	14,652	93.12%	93.31%	91.92%	90.27%	85.09%
Black or African American alone (NH)	1,109	1,058	952	1,000	1,008	5.82%	5.74%	5.48%	5.61%	5.85%
Native American or Alaska Native alone (NH)	22	13	41	49	55	0.12%	0.07%	0.24%	0.27%	0.32%
Asian alone (NH)	57	91	64	121	159	0.30%	0.49%	0.37%	0.68%	0.92%
Native Hawaiian or Pacific Islander alone (NH)	x	x	0	4	4	x	x	0.00%	0.02%	0.02%
Other race alone (NH)	29	6	11	24	36	0.15%	0.03%	0.06%	0.13%	0.21%
Mixed race or Multiracial (NH)	x	x	166	317	850	x	x	0.96%	1.78%	4.94%
Hispanic or Latino (any race)	93	64	169	221	455	0.49%	0.35%	0.97%	1.24%	2.64%
Total	19,042	18,426	17,367	17,835	17,219	100.00%	100.00%	100.00%	100.00%	100.00%

=== 2020 census ===
As of the 2020 census, Bristol had a population of 17,219. The median age was 43.3 years; 20.3% of residents were under the age of 18 and 22.2% were 65 years of age or older. For every 100 females there were 90.3 males, and for every 100 females age 18 and over there were 85.5 males.

99.0% of residents lived in urban areas, while 1.0% lived in rural areas.

There were 7,721 households in Bristol, of which 25.7% had children under the age of 18 living in them. Of all households, 37.4% were married-couple households, 19.3% were households with a male householder and no spouse or partner present, and 36.0% were households with a female householder and no spouse or partner present. About 36.2% of all households were made up of individuals and 17.9% had someone living alone who was 65 years of age or older.

There were 8,670 housing units, of which 10.9% were vacant. The homeowner vacancy rate was 2.3% and the rental vacancy rate was 9.4%.

Racial composition as of the 2020 census
Race	Number	Percent
White	14,754	85.7%
Black or African American	1,051	6.1%
American Indian and Alaska Native	57	0.3%
Asian	162	0.9%
Native Hawaiian and Other Pacific Islander	4	0.0%
Some other race	103	0.6%
Two or more races	1,088	6.3%
Hispanic or Latino (of any race)	455	2.6%

=== 2000 census ===
As of the census of 2000, there were 17,367 people, 7,678 households, and 4,798 families residing in the city. The population density was 1,346.4 inhabitants per square mile (519.8/km^{2}). There were 8,469 housing units at an average density of 656.6 units per square mile (253.5 units/km^{2}). The racial makeup of the city was 92.54% White, 5.57% Black or African American, 0.25% Native American, 0.37% Asian, 0.01% Pacific Islander, 0.18% from other races, and 1.08% from two or more races. 0.97% of the population were Hispanic or Latino of any race.

There were 7,678 households, out of which 24.8% had children under the age of 18 living with them, 46.1% were married couples living together, 13.6% had a female householder with no husband present, and 37.5% were non-families. 34.3% of all households were made up of individuals, and 17.4% had someone living alone who was 65 years of age or older. The average household size was 2.18 and the average family size was 2.78.

In the city, the population was spread out, with 20.3% under the age of 18, 8.6% from 18 to 24, 26.2% from 25 to 44, 24.4% from 45 to 64, and 20.5% who were 65 years of age or older. The median age was 41 years. For every 100 females, there were 82.0 males. For every 100 females age 18 and over, there were 75.9 males.

The median income for a household in the city was $27,389, and the median income for a family was $34,266. Males had a median income of $28,420 versus $20,967 for females. The per capita income for the city was $17,311. About 13.2% of families and 16.2% of the population were below the poverty line, including 25.8% of those under age 18 and 12.4% of those age 65 or over.

== Economy ==
=== Top employers ===
According to Bristol's 2011 Comprehensive Annual Financial Report, the top employers in the city are:

#	Employer	# of Employees
1	City of Bristol	676
2	Electro-Mechanical Corporation	600
3	OfficeMax	500
4	Sprint PCS	428
5	US Solutions	367
6	Strongwell	350
7	Commonwealth of Virginia	250
8	Shearer's Foods	225
9	Ball	218
10	Aerus	201
11	United Parcel Service	193

== Culture ==
=== "Birthplace of Country Music" ===
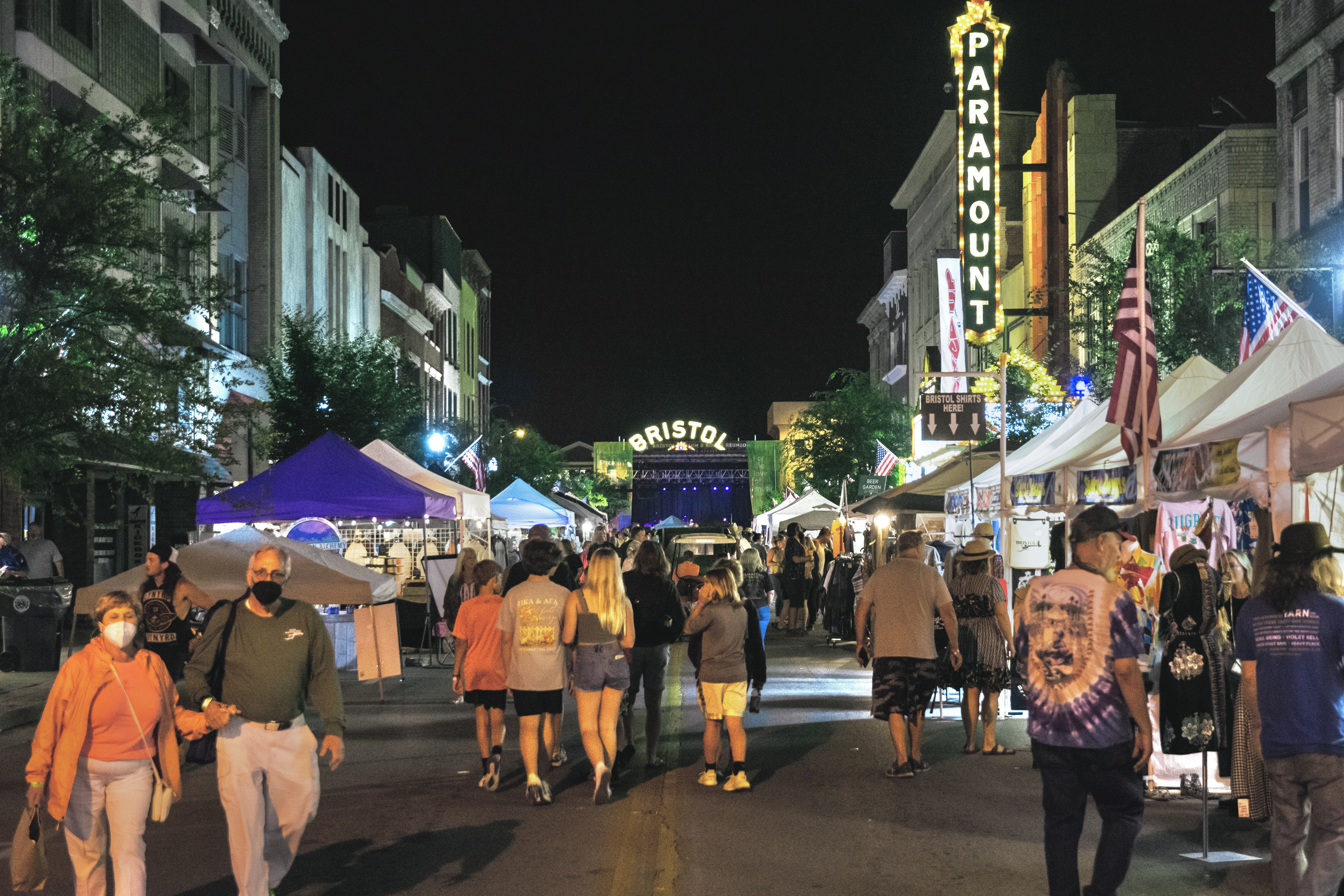
2021 Bristol Rhythm & Roots Reunion festival

Bristol was recognized as the "Birthplace of Country Music", according to a resolution passed by the US Congress in 1998; residents of the city had contributed to early country music recordings and influence, and the Birthplace of Country Music Museum is located in Bristol.

In 1927 record producer Ralph Peer of Victor Records began recording local musicians in Bristol to attempt to capture the local sound of traditional "folk" music of the region. One of these local sounds was created by the Carter Family. The Carter Family got their start on July 31, 1927, when A.P. Carter and his family journeyed from Maces Spring, Virginia, to Bristol, Tennessee, to audition for Peer who was seeking new talent for the relatively embryonic recording industry. They received $50 for each song they recorded.

On the early hours of January 1, 1953, Hank Williams stopped in Bristol during some of the last moments of his life. He was being driven to a concert in Canton, Ohio by Charles Carr. Carr stopped outside a hamburger joint today named Burger Bar and asked Williams if he wanted to eat, to which Williams responded negatively.

Since 1994, the Birthplace of Country Music Alliance has promoted the city as a destination to learn about the history of the region and its role in the creation of an entire music genre. The Alliance is organizing the building of a new Cultural Heritage Center to help educate the public about the history of country music in the region.

=== Professional sports ===
Bristol hosted the Bristol Pirates baseball team of the Appalachian League from 1969 to 2020. In conjunction with a contraction of Minor League Baseball beginning with the 2021 season, the Appalachian League was reorganized as a collegiate summer baseball league, and the Pirates were replaced by a new franchise named the Bristol State Liners in the revamped league designed for rising college freshman and sophomores.

Former NASCAR driver Kelly Denton is from the city.

On the Tennessee side, Bristol is home to Bristol Motor Speedway, the "world's fastest half mile", which hosts two NASCAR Cup Series races, two races per year on the NASCAR Xfinity Series and one race per year on the Craftsman Truck Series, and various other racing events. The complex includes the Bristol Dragway, nicknamed "Thunder Valley", referencing the hills that echo the engine noise back toward the crowd.

== Government ==
United States presidential election results for Bristol, Virginia
Year	Republican		Democratic		Third party(ies)	
Year	No.	%	No.	%	No.	%
1892	235	32.82%	465	64.94%	16	2.23%
1896	384	46.55%	413	50.06%	28	3.39%
1900	281	25.99%	787	72.80%	13	1.20%
1904	133	30.02%	297	67.04%	13	2.93%
1908	187	31.22%	405	67.61%	7	1.17%
1912	86	15.19%	405	71.55%	75	13.25%
1916	184	27.18%	489	72.23%	4	0.59%
1920	344	30.34%	784	69.14%	6	0.53%
1924	440	29.22%	1,036	68.79%	30	1.99%
1928	630	40.59%	922	59.41%	0	0.00%
1932	307	19.39%	1,252	79.09%	24	1.52%
1936	311	18.49%	1,364	81.09%	7	0.42%
1940	423	22.22%	1,465	76.94%	16	0.84%
1944	628	28.57%	1,561	71.02%	9	0.41%
1948	879	35.70%	1,451	58.94%	132	5.36%
1952	1,574	52.31%	1,432	47.59%	3	0.10%
1956	1,794	51.89%	1,645	47.58%	18	0.52%
1960	1,728	52.38%	1,561	47.32%	10	0.30%
1964	1,289	34.62%	2,429	65.24%	5	0.13%
1968	1,930	44.09%	1,531	34.98%	916	20.93%
1972	2,665	68.46%	1,157	29.72%	71	1.82%
1976	2,943	46.27%	3,343	52.55%	75	1.18%
1980	3,432	52.68%	2,889	44.34%	194	2.98%
1984	5,012	67.11%	2,429	32.53%	27	0.36%
1988	4,407	63.92%	2,446	35.47%	42	0.61%
1992	3,616	48.46%	2,948	39.51%	898	12.03%
1996	2,983	49.50%	2,586	42.91%	457	7.58%
2000	3,495	55.66%	2,646	42.14%	138	2.20%
2004	4,275	63.58%	2,400	35.69%	49	0.73%
2008	4,579	62.22%	2,665	36.21%	115	1.56%
2012	4,780	64.71%	2,492	33.73%	115	1.56%
2016	4,892	69.57%	1,835	26.09%	305	4.34%
2020	5,347	68.50%	2,313	29.63%	146	1.87%
2024	5,197	69.39%	2,231	29.79%	62	0.83%

January 3, 2024 to January 3, 2025:

Government

- Mayor: Jake Holmes
- Vice Mayor: Neal Osborne
- Council Member: Anthony Farnum
- Council Member: Alex Littleton
- Council Member: Michael Pollard
- City Manager: Tamrya Spradlin
- City Attorney: Jim Guynn (interim)
- Clerk of Court: Kelly Duffy (I)
- Commissioner of Revenue: Cloe Eva Barker (D)
- Commonwealth's Attorney: Jerry Wolfe (R)
- Sheriff: Tyrone Foster (I)
- Treasurer: Angel Britt (R)

=== Past mayors ===
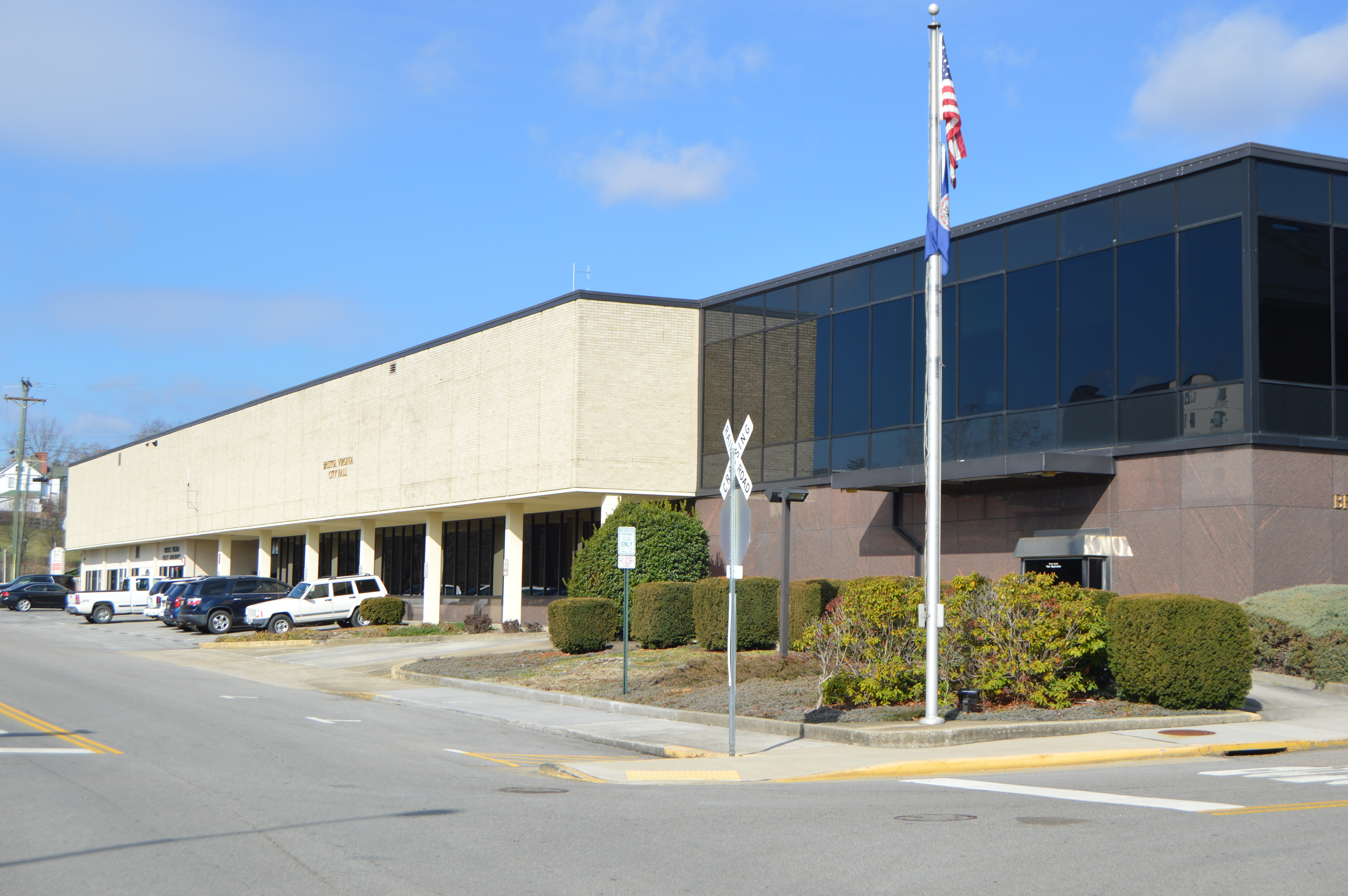
Bristol City Hall

- James F. Rector, 1984–92, 2007–10
- Jerry Wolfe, 1992–97, 2000–01, 2003–04
- Farham Jarrard, 1997–00, 2006–07
- Douglas R. Weberling, 2001–03, 2005–06
- Paul W. Hurley, 2004–05
- Don Ashley, 2010–11
- Ed Harlow, 2011–12
- Jim Steele, 2012–13
- Guy Odum, 2013–14
- Catherine Brillhart, 2014–15 (first female mayor)
- Archie Hubbard, III, 2015–16
- Bill Hartley, 2016–17, 2020–21
- Kevin Mumpower, 2017–19
- Neal Osborne, 2019–20, 2023–24
- Anthony Farnum, 2021–23
- Becky Nave, 2024-2026

=== Police ===
Bristol Police Department
- Abbreviation: BPD

Jurisdictional structure
- Operations jurisdiction: Bristol, Virginia, United States
- General nature: Local civilian police

Operational structure
- Sworn members: 53
- Unsworn members: 21
- Agency executive: Byron Ashbrook, Chief

Website
- https://www.bristolva.gov/155/Police-Department

Bristol is served by two law enforcement agencies: the city police and the city sheriff's department. Supporting the department is the city's E-911 Central Dispatch Emergency Communication Center which provides call taking and dispatch service for police, fire and EMS needs.

== Education ==
In 2007 and 2008, Bristol was named one of the Best 100 Communities for Music Education

The city school division, Bristol Virginia Public Schools, operates Virginia High School and Virginia Middle School, together with Virginia Primary School, and Virginia Intermediate School. Two private schools — St. Anne Catholic, and Morrison — are operated within the city. Bristol was formerly home to two post-secondary institutions, Sullins College and Virginia Intermont College, but these colleges closed in 1978 and 2014 respectively.

School Board Members:

- Chair: Vanessa Guffey
- Vice Chair: Steve Fletcher
- Member: Randy Alvis
- Member: Bill Hartley
- Member: Joshua Slagle
- Superintendent: David Scott

== Media ==
Television:

- PBS Appalachia Virginia in Bristol, VA (cable and streaming)
- WCYB-TV in Bristol, VA (NBC Channel 5; CW on DT2)
- WEMT-TV in Bristol, VA (Fox Channel 39)
- WJHL-TV in Johnson City, TN (CBS Channel 11; ABC on DT2)

Newspaper:

- Bristol Herald Courier

Radio:

- WEXX 99.3 FM
- WAEZ 94.9 FM
- WXBQ 96.9 FM
- WKJV 106.5 FM
- WZAP 690 AM
- WWTB 980 AM
- WOPI 1490 AM
- WIGN 1550 AM
- WBCM-LP 100.1

== Technology ==
Despite its relatively small size, Bristol, Virginia, boasts one of the more advanced broadband networks in the country. BVU Authority (formerly Bristol Virginia Utilities or BVU) started planning a fiber optic deployment in the city in the late 1990s. By 2001, BVU had been granted approval by the city council for a full deployment of a Fiber to the premises (FTTP or FTTU, fiber to the user) project. This project was to offer competition to local incumbents and provide broadband Internet, cable TV, and telephone service to the residents of Bristol. This deployment was one of the first of its kind in the United States and was widely watched by the telecommunications industry. A system known as Passive optical network (PON) was successfully deployed to over 6,000 customers in a matter of two years.

In 2003, in the relatively isolated city of Bristol, Virginia, BVU, created a nonprofit division called "Optinet", a municipal broadband Internet service that covers Bristol as well as the Southwest portion of the state of Virginia. Serving around 12,500 customers, BVU is recognized as the "first municipal utility in the United States to deploy an all-fiber network offering the triple play of video, voice and data services". On October 29, 2009, BVU received US$3.5 million in grant funding from the Virginia Tobacco Indemnification and Community Revitalization Commission. With these funds BVU will build "an additional 49 miles of its OptiNet fiber-optic backbone from Abingdon up I-81 to Virginia Route 16 from Marion into Grayson County". This will also allow for BVU to make a second connection with Mid Atlantic Broadband, increasing communication between different businesses in Northern Virginia. The Virginia Tobacco Community funded this project because it provided their business with more connections in crucial areas of the southwest and southern part of Virginia.

The U.S. Department of Commerce also funded BVU. On July 3, 2010, it was reported that they gave US$22.7 million in stimulus funds to Southwest Virginia to create a "388-mile optic backbone through an eight-county region". This project will service over 120 institutions, such as schools, hospitals, government buildings, and many more besides. This new municipals broadband service will also be within a two-mile distance of over 500 different businesses. This project also created 295 new jobs. BVU Optinet continues operate a strong municipal broadband Internet service for Bristol and many other counties in Virginia.

Bristol's twin city in Tennessee has deployed an FTTP system similar to its neighbor across the state line.

On August 2, 2018, BVU Authority completed a sale of the OptiNet FTTP network to a private company, Sunset Digital of Duffield, Virginia for $50 M. The sale began in late 2015 and was publicly announced in early 2016. Along with the sale of OptiNet, BVU's joint network with Cumberland Plateau Co. was sold to Sunset Digital. In addition to the network assets, Sunset agreed to hire approximately 75 BVU employees from BVU.

== Transportation ==
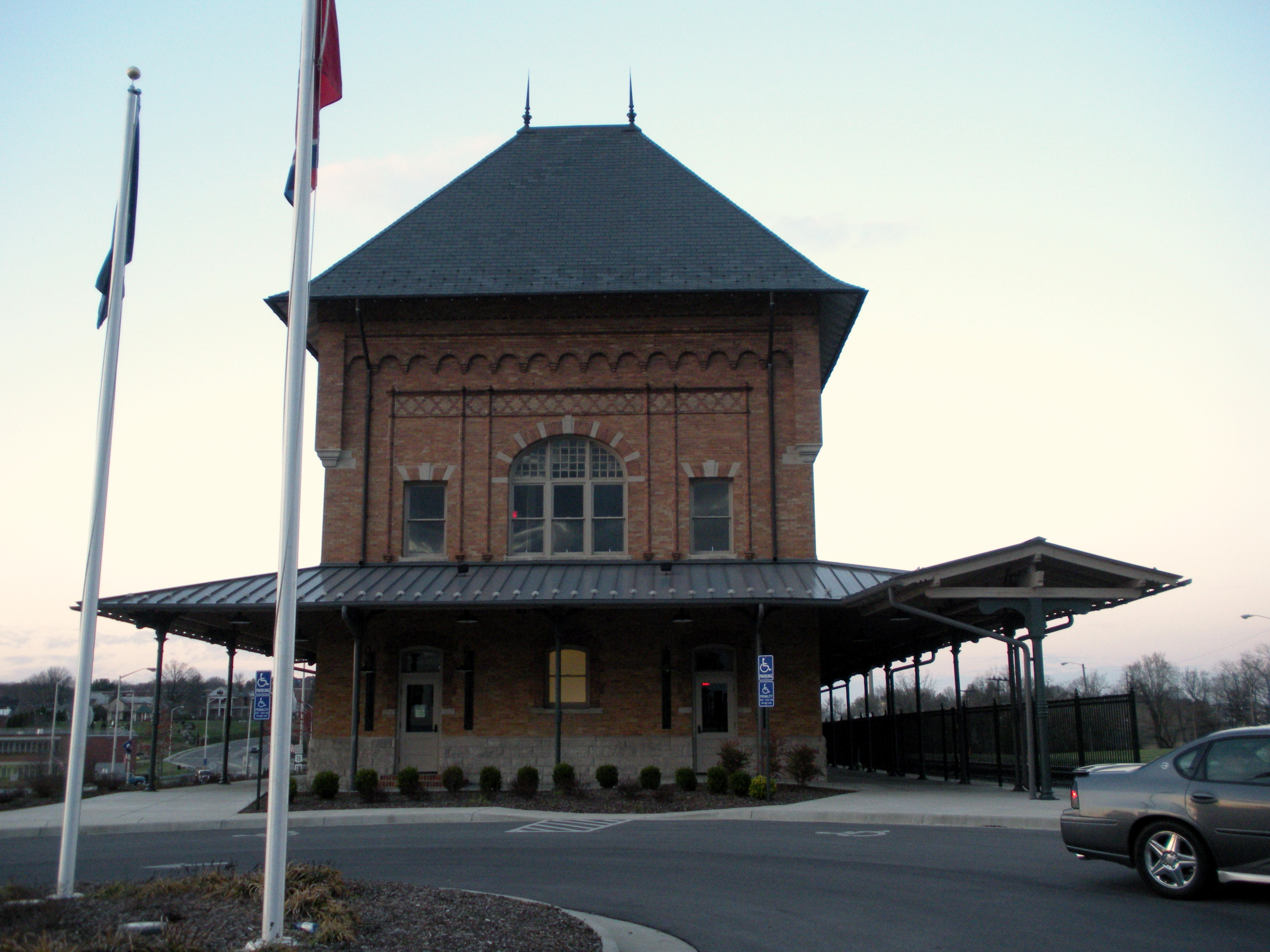
Bristol station

=== Air transport ===
The Tri-Cities Regional Airport, with approximately 195,000 annual passengers, is 19 miles to the southwest of Bristol.

=== Highways ===
U.S. Route 11, U.S. Route 19 and U.S. Route 421 run through the city.

In the vicinity, to the northwest, is Interstate 81, which takes travelers northward to Roanoke, about 150 miles (240 km) away and southward to Knoxville about 113 miles (182 km) to the south. Nashville is 293 miles (472 km) southwest.

=== Rail ===
Until 1970 the Southern Railway ran a couple of trains through the city, making stops at Bristol station, the last trains being the Birmingham Special and the Pelican. Until 1968 the Memphis-bound Tennessean made a stop in the city.

A local coalition began advocating for Amtrak service around 2010, and local interest grew following the extension of Northeast Regional service to Roanoke in 2017. A study in 2019 concluded that a further extension to Bristol via Wytheville and Christiansburg could be financially viable but would require $30 million in track improvements between Bristol and Roanoke. In 2020, Gov. Ralph Northam described Amtrak service to Bristol as a "logical step" but said that it would be conditional upon the replacement of the Long Bridge with a higher-throughput rail crossing of the Potomac River.

== Notable people ==
- Robert E. Clay (1875–1961), educator
- Jim Crockett, Sr. (1908-1973), wrestling promoter
- Kelly Denton (born 1973), racing driver
- Bud Phillips (1929–2017), author and historian
- Gene McEver (1908-1985), American football player and coach
- Beattie Feathers (1909-1979), American football player and coach

== See also ==
- National Register of Historic Places listings in Bristol, Virginia
