= National Register of Historic Places listings in Washington County, Virginia =

Location of Washington County in Virginia

This is a list of the National Register of Historic Places listings in Washington County, Virginia.

This is intended to be a complete list of the properties and districts on the National Register of Historic Places in Washington County, Virginia, United States. The locations of National Register properties and districts for which the latitude and longitude coordinates are included below, may be seen in an online map.

There are 17 properties and districts listed on the National Register in the county.

This National Park Service list is complete through NPS recent listings posted February 6, 2026.

== Current listings ==
	Name on the Register	Image	Date listed	Location	City or town	Description
1	Abingdon Bank	Abingdon Bank	November 12, 1969 (#69000285)	225 E. Main St. 36°42′46″N 81°58′10″W	Abingdon	
2	Abingdon Historic District	Abingdon Historic District	February 26, 1970 (#70000831)	Both sides of Main St. between Cummings and Deadmore Sts.; also roughly bounded by Russell Rd. and Jackson St., Whites Mill Rd., E. Main, E. Park, and W. Main Sts., and Academy Dr. 36°42′42″N 81°58′18″W	Abingdon	Second set of boundaries represents a boundary increase of September 17, 1986
3	Baker-St. John House	Baker-St. John House	February 22, 2011 (#11000033)	18254 Providence Rd. 36°41′08″N 82°02′28″W	Abingdon	
4	Brook Hall	Brook Hall	June 5, 1997 (#97000490)	13160 Byars Ln. 36°45′47″N 81°48′10″W	Glade Spring	
5	Crabtree-Blackwell Farm	Crabtree-Blackwell Farm	April 1, 1975 (#75002041)	1 mile south of Blackwell on Moore Creek Rd. 36°49′04″N 81°51′12″W	Blackwell	
6	Depot Square Historic District		November 18, 2020 (#100005802)	Wall St. South, Depot Sq. SW, Front St. SW, Grand St. SW; 36°42′28″N 81°58′52″W	Abingdon	
7	Edmondson Hall	Edmondson Hall	June 11, 1998 (#98000697)	Lindell Rd., 0.25 miles north of the junction of State Route 80 and the Hillman Highway; 36°45′45″N 81°51′52″W	Meadowview	
8	Emory and Henry College	Emory and Henry College	January 30, 1989 (#85003695)	Oxford Ave. 36°46′21″N 81°49′55″W	Emory	
9	Glade Spring Commercial Historic District	Glade Spring Commercial Historic District	May 28, 2013 (#13000345)	Portions of Town Square St., Grace St., E. Glade St., and Hemlock St. 36°47′26″N 81°46′16″W	Glade Spring	Twenty-two contributing buildings and one contributing structure.
10	The Grove	The Grove	May 16, 2002 (#02000525)	14071 U.S. Routes 11/19; 36°38′27″N 82°06′34″W	Bristol	
11	Mont Calm	Mont Calm	July 18, 1974 (#74002148)	West of State Route 75; 36°42′27″N 81°58′24″W	Abingdon	
12	Moonlite Theatre	Moonlite Theatre	August 8, 2007 (#07000802)	17555 U.S. Routes 11/19; 36°40′35″N 82°02′55″W	Abingdon	Drive-in theater built in 1949.
13	Dr. William H. Pitts House	Dr. William H. Pitts House	April 1, 2002 (#02000322)	247 E. Main St. 36°42′46″N 81°58′07″W	Abingdon	
14	Retirement and the Muster Grounds	Retirement and the Muster Grounds	May 11, 2018 (#100002441)	702 Colonial Rd. SW; 36°42′14″N 81°59′39″W	Abingdon	
15	Saltville Battlefields Historic District	Saltville Battlefields Historic District	March 25, 2010 (#10000096)	State Routes 91 and 107, and Cedar Branch Rd. 36°52′00″N 81°46′48″W	Saltville	Extends into Smyth County
16	Walnut Grove	Walnut Grove	August 11, 2004 (#04000840)	14081 U.S. Routes 11/19; 36°38′15″N 82°07′06″W	Bristol	
17	White's Mill	White's Mill	September 10, 1974 (#74002149)	Northwest of Abingdon on White Mill Rd. 36°46′05″N 81°59′17″W	Abingdon	

== See also ==
- List of National Historic Landmarks in Virginia
- National Register of Historic Places listings in Virginia
- National Register of Historic Places listings in Bristol, Virginia
