= Hayter =

Hayter may refer to:

== Places ==
- Hayter, Virginia, an unincorporated community
- Hayter, Alberta, Canada, a hamlet
- Hayter Road, Edmonton, Alberta
- Mount Hayter, Oates Land, Antarctica
- Hayter Peak, Heard Island, Indian Ocean

== Other uses ==
- Hayter (lawn mowers), a manufacturer and distributor of domestic and commercial lawn mowers
- Hayter (surname), a list of people and one fictional character
- Hayter Reed (1849–1936), Canadian politician
- Baron Hayter, a title in the Peerage of the United Kingdom
- USS Hayter (DE-212), a destroyer escort
