= Kingsport–Bristol–Bristol metropolitan area =

Metropolitan area in Tennessee and Virginia, United States

Kingsport–Bristol–Bristol
- Metropolitan statistical area
- Kingsport–Bristol, TN–VA
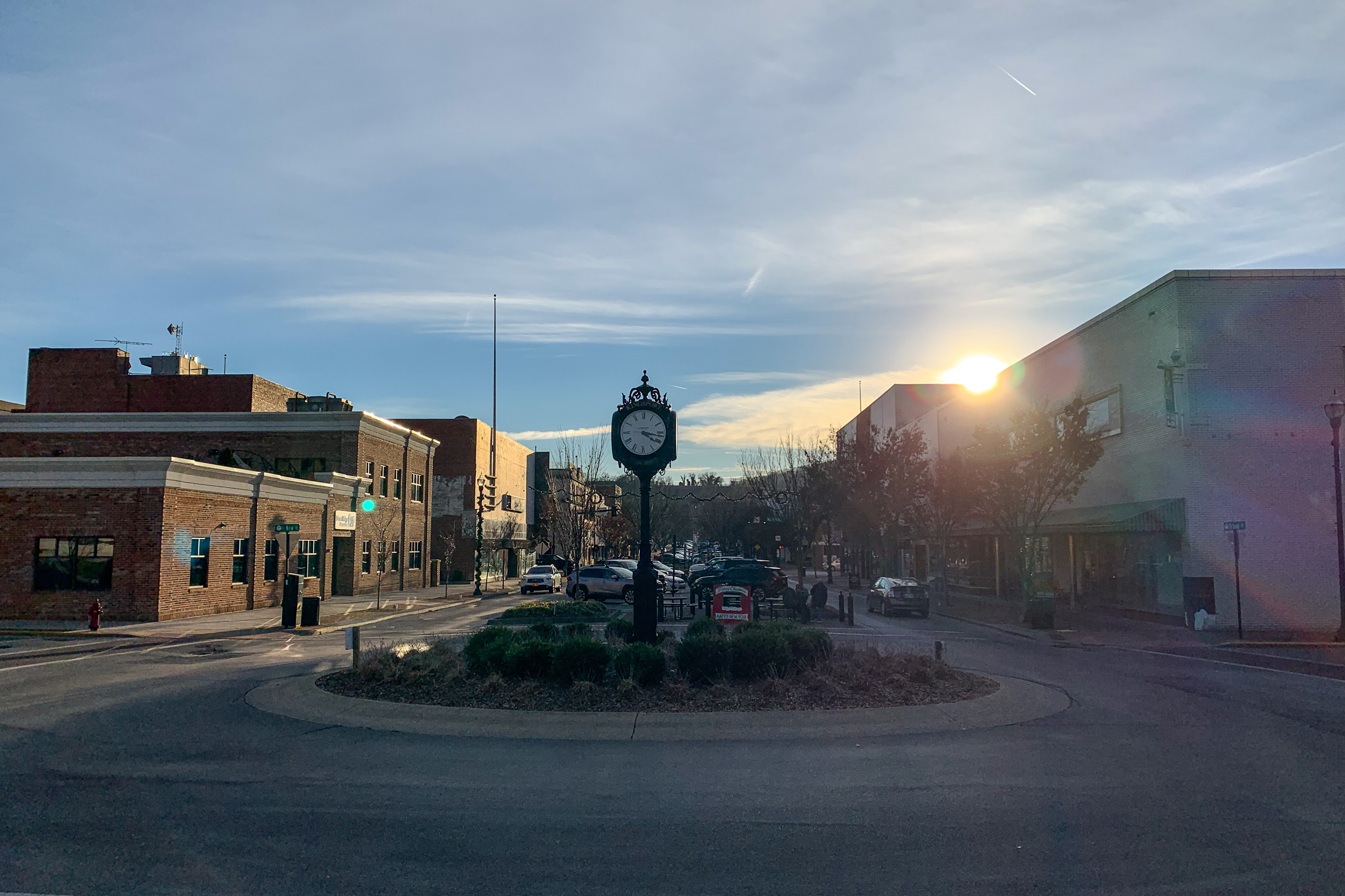
- Broad Street in Downtown Kingsport
Johnson City–Kingsport–Bristol, TN–VA CSA
Kingsport–Bristol, TN–VA MSA
Johnson City, TN MSA
Greeneville, TN µSA
Kingsport, TN
Johnson City, TN
Bristol, TN and Bristol, VA
- Country: United States
- State: Tennessee; Virginia
- County: Tennessee: Hawkins County; Sullivan County; Virginia: Scott County; Washington County; City of Bristol (Independent City)

Area
  - Total: 1,932 sq mi (5,004 km^{2})

Population (2020)
  - Total: 305,629

GDP
  - Total: $27.539 billion (2022)
- Time zone: UTC−5 (EST)
  - Summer (DST): UTC−4 (EDT)

The Kingsport–Bristol metropolitan area is a metropolitan statistical area (MSA) in Northeast Tennessee and Southwest Virginia, United States, as defined by the Office of Management and Budget (OMB). It was formed in December 2003 by the merger of the Bristol, VA MSA, and Kingsport–Bristol, TN–VA MSA. It is a component of the Johnson City–Kingsport–Bristol, TN–VA Combined Statistical Area – commonly known as the "Tri-Cities" region.

As of the 2000 census, the MSA had a population of 298,494 (though a July 1, 2009, estimate placed the population at 305,629).

== MSA components ==
Four counties (two in Tennessee; two in Virginia) and one independent city are included in the area.

=== Tennessee ===
- Hawkins County
- Sullivan County

=== Virginia ===
Note: Since a state constitutional change in 1871, all cities in Virginia are independent cities that are not located in any county. The OMB considers these independent cities to be county-equivalents for the purpose of defining MSAs in Virginia.

- Scott County
- Washington County
- Bristol (independent city)

== Communities ==
=== Places with more than 50,000 inhabitants ===
- Kingsport, Tennessee (principal city)
- Johnson City, Tennessee (partial)

=== Places with 10,000 to 40,000 inhabitants ===
- Bristol, Tennessee (principal city)
- Bristol, Virginia
- Bloomingdale, Tennessee (census-designated place)

=== Places with 1,000 to 10,000 inhabitants ===
- Abingdon, Virginia
- Bean Station, Tennessee (partial)
- Blountville, Tennessee (census-designated place)
- Bluff City, Tennessee
- Church Hill, Tennessee
- Colonial Heights, Tennessee (census-designated place)
- Emory-Meadowview, Virginia (census-designated place)
- Gate City, Virginia
- Glade Spring, Virginia
- Mount Carmel, Tennessee
- Rogersville, Tennessee
- Saltville, Virginia (partial)
- Spurgeon, Tennessee (census-designated place; partial)
- Surgoinsville, Tennessee
- Tusculum, Tennessee
- Walnut Hill, Tennessee (census-designated place)
- Weber City, Virginia

=== Places with less than 1,000 inhabitants ===
- Bulls Gap, Tennessee
- Damascus, Virginia
- Clinchport, Virginia
- Duffield, Virginia
- Dungannon, Virginia
- Nickelsville, Virginia

=== Unincorporated places ===
- Arcadia, Tennessee
- Clinchburg, Virginia
- Eidson, Tennessee
- Fort Blackmore, Virginia
- Friendship, Virginia
- Hayter's Gap, Virginia
- Hiltons, Virginia
- Konnarock, Virginia
- Lodi, Virginia
- Maces Spring, Virginia
- Mendota, Virginia
- Mooresburg, Tennessee
- Piney Flats, Tennessee
- Sullivan Gardens, Tennessee
- Yuma, Virginia

== Demographics ==
As of the 2000 census, there were 298,484 people, 124,021 households, and 87,501 families residing within the MSA. The racial makeup of the MSA was 96.77% White, 1.84% African American, 0.19% Native American, 0.33% Asian, 0.02% Pacific Islander, 0.19% from other races, and 0.66% from two or more races. Hispanic or Latino of any race were 0.70% of the population.

The median income for a household in the MSA was $30,460, and the median income for a family was $37,235. Males had a median income of $29,803 versus $21,312 for females. The per capita income for the MSA was $17,202.

County or equivalent	State	Seat	2025 Estimate	2020 Census	Change	Area	Density
Sullivan	Tennessee	Blountville	163,759	158,163	+3.54%	430 sq mi (1,100 km^{2})	381/sq mi (147/km^{2})
Hawkins	Tennessee	Rogersville	59,559	56,721	+5.00%	500 sq mi (1,300 km^{2})	119/sq mi (46/km^{2})
Washington	Virginia	Abingdon	53,898	53,935	−0.07%	566 sq mi (1,470 km^{2})	95/sq mi (37/km^{2})
Scott	Virginia	Gate City	21,200	21,576	−1.74%	539 sq mi (1,400 km^{2})	39/sq mi (15/km^{2})
Bristol city	Virginia	—	16,418	17,219	−4.65%	13 sq mi (34 km^{2})	1,263/sq mi (488/km^{2})
Total			314,834	307,614	+2.35%	2,048 sq mi (5,300 km^{2})	154/sq mi (59/km^{2})

== Combined statistical area ==
The Johnson City–Kingsport–Bristol combined statistical area (CSA) is made up of five counties in Northeastern Tennessee as well as two counties and an independent city in Southwestern Virginia. The statistical area includes two metropolitan areas. As of the 2000 census, the CSA had a population of 480,091 (though a July 1, 2007, estimate placed the population at 497,240).

=== Components ===
- Metropolitan statistical areas (MSAs)
  - Johnson City (Carter County, TN; Unicoi County, TN; Washington County, TN)
  - Kingsport–Bristol–Bristol (Hawkins County, TN; Sullivan County, TN; Scott County, VA; Washington County, VA; City of Bristol, VA)

== See also ==
- Virginia statistical areas
