= Taylors Valley, Virginia =

Taylors Valley
- Unincorporated community
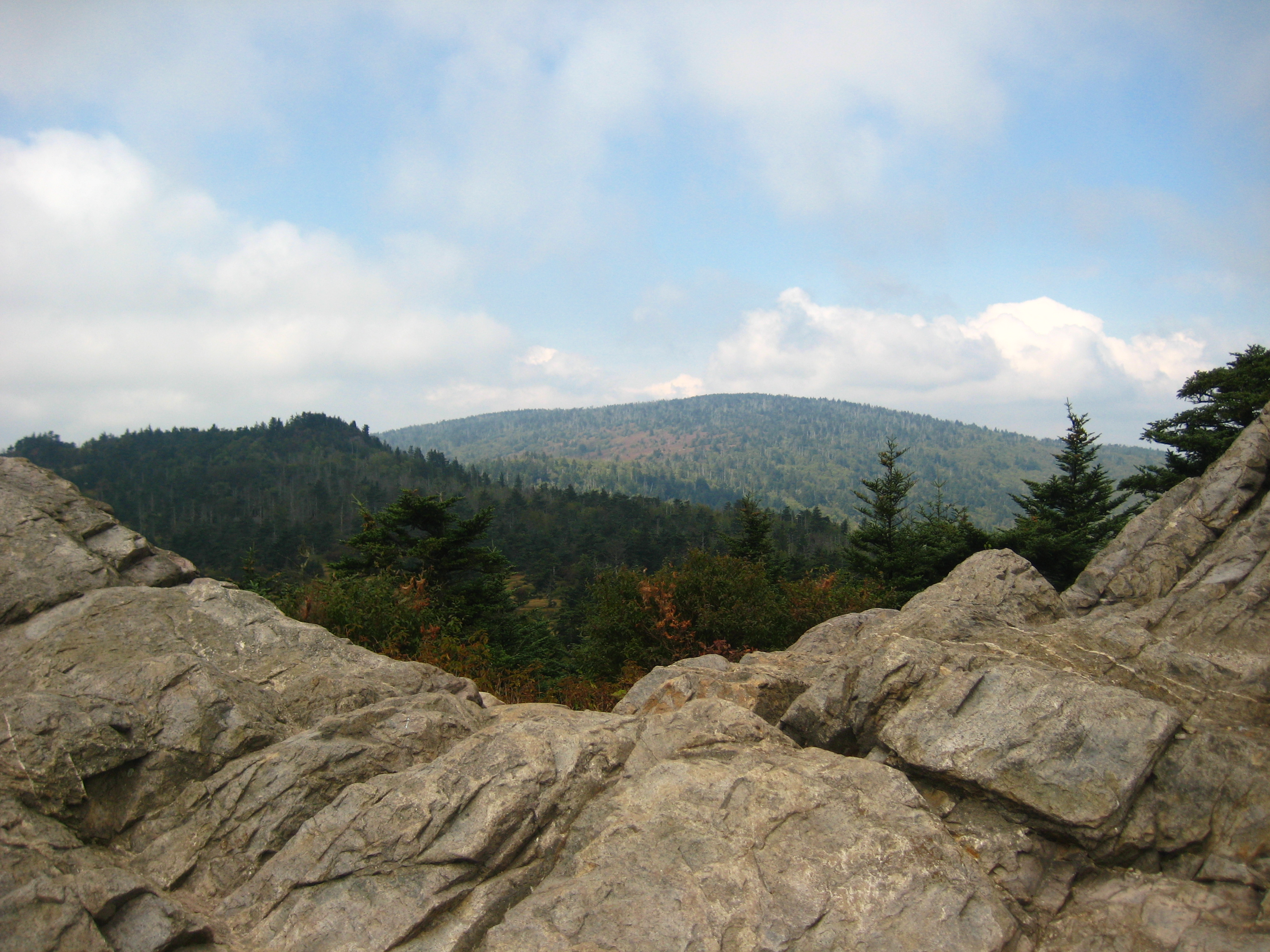
- Taylors Valley is located within the Mount Rogers National Recreation Area

- Location within Virginia
- Coordinates: 36°37′40″N 81°42′42″W
- Country: United States
- State: Virginia
- County: Washington
- Time zone: UTC−5 (Eastern (EST))
  - Summer (DST): UTC−4 (EDT)

Taylors Valley is an unincorporated community in Washington County, in the state of Virginia, United States. It is located to the southeast of Abingdon and is accessed via Highway 58 and via Taylor Valley Road from Tennessee, just to the south.

== Geography ==
Taylors Valley is located in southwestern Virginia at an altitude of 722 metres (2369 feet), close to the border with Tennessee. It is located along a notable bike trail, the Virginia Creeper Trail, which makes a gradual climb into Taylors Valley. The nearest town is Damascus, which is located to the west. The community, which is located in the Mount Rogers National Recreation Area, is bounded by Fork mountain to the west and Laurel and Chestnut mountains to the east. Whitetop Laurel Creek passes through the unincorporated community.

== Economy ==
Taylor Valley is an old fashioned country village with few commercial entities. There are no gas stations or stores, and village residents rely on the stores in Damascus, VA, and Mountain City, TN, for daily supplies. The sole food venue in the Valley is Hellbender's Cafe, which opened nearly contemporaneously with the closing of the Creeper Train Cafe in 2020. The one small store in the vicinity (Widener's Grocery) shut down when the owner, Clarence "Eddie" Widener, died in 2020. There are plans to reopen the store sometime before 2024, according to some of Eddie's family members. The Virginia Creeper Trail runs through the Valley, increasing foot traffic and the number of recreational bicycle riders, for a great part of the year.
