= Edmondson Hall =

Historic house in Virginia, United States

- U.S. National Register of Historic Places
- Virginia Landmarks Register
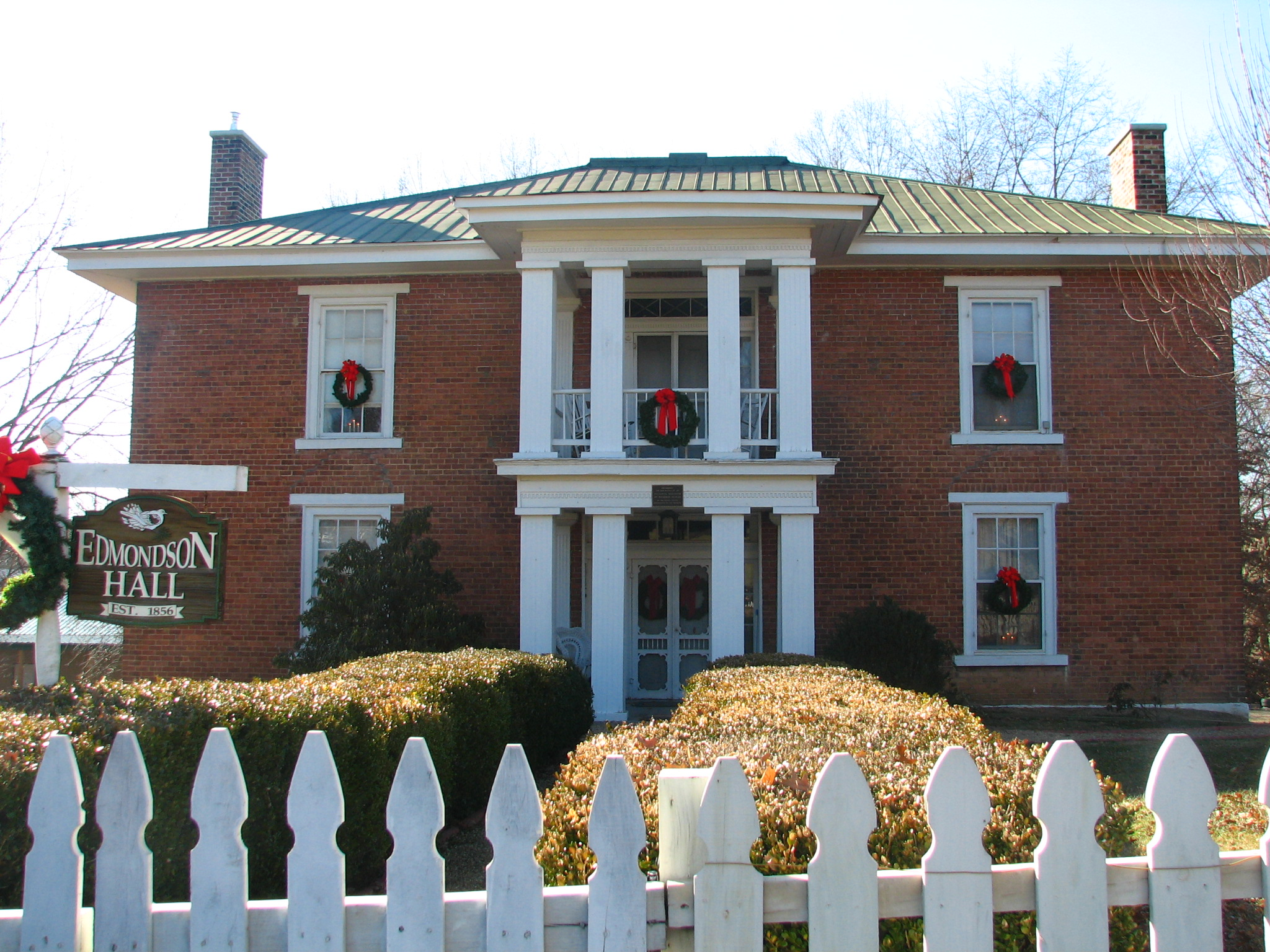

- Location within Virginia Location within the United States
- Nearest city: Meadowview, Virginia
- Coordinates: 36°45′45″N 81°51′53″W
- Built: 1856
- Architectural style: Greek Revival
- NRHP reference No.: 98000697
- VLR No.: 095-0500-0011

Significant dates
- Added to NRHP: June 11, 1998
- Designated VLR: September 17, 1997

Edmondson Hall was built in 1856 just outside Meadowview, this brick, Greek Revival house has withstood time very well. William Campbell Edmondson, an early pioneer and merchant, built the house, and the original parcel included 383 acres (1.55 km^{2}) in the fertile valley. On June 11, 1998, the house was listed on the National Register of Historic Places.

== Early years ==
In the early years of the house, the bedrooms were probably fully occupied by children. William and Susan Edmondson were the parents of five children. William remarried after Susan's death to Sarah Edmondson and they both had three children. In addition to the family living here, the Edmondsons in 1860 owned 14 slaves, seven of whom were children under the age of 12. Two slave cabins were located on the property as well.

== Description ==
The house was a large and fine house for its time and place. A late example of the Greek Revival style, the main decorative focus on the exterior of the house is the two-tiered entry porch. The interior has a center hall plan with 4 rooms on each floor, each with a fireplace, and two rooms in the rear ell. The house still retains most of its original features, including the paint graining on fireplace surrounds, doors and trim.

Items listed in a deed of Homestead filed by Edmondson in 1881 indicate the quality of furnishings in the home. The parlor was carpeted with a Brussels carpet, and contained a set of sofas, a Steiff piano, gilt looking glass, six cushioned chairs and two parlor rocking chairs. Upstairs, two of the bedrooms were described as the Ladies' room and the Gentlemen's room and were outfitted with beds, washstands, wardrobes, bureaus and carpets.

== Owners ==
After William's death in 1883, Mrs. Edmondson remained in the home until about 1894. The house was sold in 1895 and owned by Dr. William T. Delaney until 1911. Later owners were H. M. Brooks (1911–1918), Walter Gregory (1918–1951), W. A. and Mary G. Megginson (1951–1991), and now privately owned by Robert M and DeVonne Salyer (1991–present).

== Ghosts ==
The Salyer family has devoted much time and labor to restoring the house to its grandeur. People who have studied supernatural phenomena claim to feel the presence of spirits when they enter the house. However, the family maintains they have never felt threatened by any of the spirits who also call the house their home.

There are local stories about finding infant bones in the attic, of seeing a ghostly woman rocking in a rocking chair in a bedroom, and people being chased from the yard by a mysterious rider on horseback. One visitor felt someone grab her in an empty room and an interior decorator helping with the house felt someone pull her hair in a front upstairs bedroom, when nobody was nearby.

One elder member of the Salyer family, nicknamed GMA, claimed to have seen identical twin girls, about 21 years old, who stayed in her room all night. The beautiful girls had long blonde hair, and one stood at the foot of her bed while the other stood at her bedroom door. The strangest thing is that the family found out later that the twins had lived in the house. GMA said "she wished they hadn't whispered so much all night because it had kept her awake".

== See also ==
- Historic houses in Virginia
- National Register of Historic Places listings in Washington County, Virginia
