= Holston High School =

Coordinates: 36.6541°N 81.7941°W

- Washington County, Virginia; United States

Information
- Established: 1964
- School district: Hogoheegee
- Superintendent: Dr. Keith Perrigan
- Principal: Gabe Long
- Grades: 9-12
- Enrollment: 259 (2020–21)
- Colors: Red and black
- Athletics conference: VHSL Class 1 VHSL Region D VHSL Hogoheegee District
- Team name: Cavaliers
- Website: Official Site

Holston High School is a public secondary school located in Washington County, Virginia.

== History ==
Holston was established in 1964, due to the consolidation of Liberty Hall High School and Damascus High School.

== Athletics ==
The school mascot is the Cavalier and the school colors are red and black.
