= David Campbell (Virginia politician) =

American politician

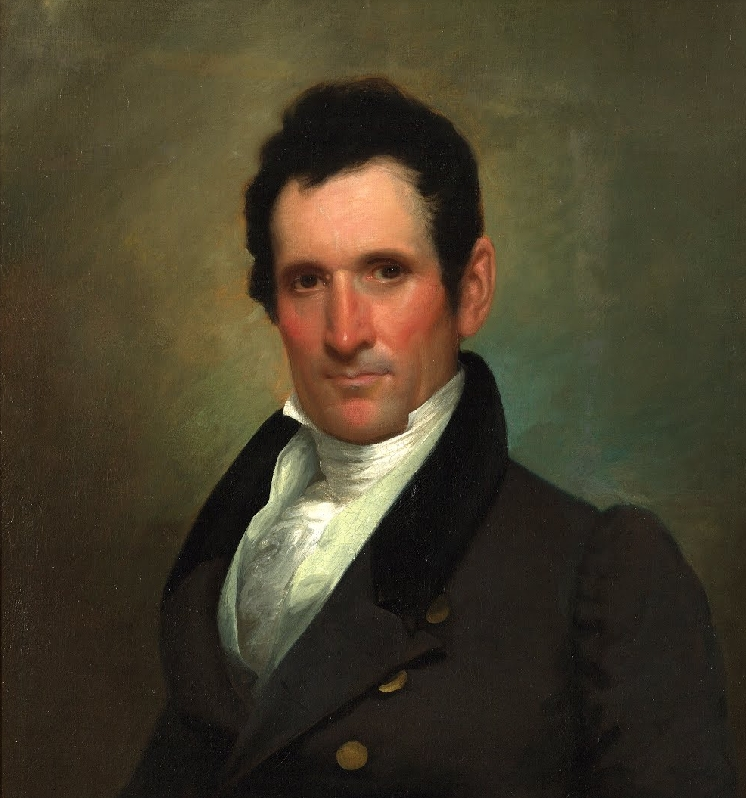

27th Governor of Virginia
- In office March 31, 1837 – March 31, 1840
- Preceded by: Wyndham Robertson (acting)
- Succeeded by: Thomas Walker Gilmer

Virginia State Senator
- In office 1820-1824
- Preceded by: Francis Preston
- Succeeded by: John D. Sharp

Personal details
- Born: August 7, 1779 Washington County (later Smyth County), Virginia
- Died: March 19, 1859 (aged 79) "Montcalm," Abingdon, Virginia
- Resting place: Sinking Spring Cemetery; 36°42′33″N 81°58′58″W
- Party: Democratic
- Spouse: Maria Hamilton Campbell

David Campbell (August 7, 1779 – March 19, 1859) was a Virginia merchant, soldier, farmer, and politician who became the 27th Governor of Virginia, serving from 1837 to 1840.

== Early and family life ==
David Campbell was born in a part of Washington County, Virginia, that later became Smyth County, to Capt. John Campbell (1742–1825) and his wife Elizabeth McDonald (1753–1827). Both of his parents were of Scottish descent. His younger brother John Campbell (1787 or 1788 – by 29 January 1867) served as treasurer of the United States from 1829 to 1839, and would be buried at Morristown, Shelby County, Indiana. Another younger brother, Edward McDonald Campbell (1781–1833), represented Lee, Russell, Scott, Tazewell, and Washington Counties in the Virginia Constitutional Convention of 1829–1830, and Edward's son John Arthur Campbell represented the area at the Virginia Secession Convention of 1861 and also served as a Confederate infantry captain and circuit judge. They may have also had two sisters, Mary Campbell Cummings (1773–1829) and Eliza Campbell (1783–1876).

David Campbell married Mary Hamilton (1783–1859) in 1800, and they raised his nephew and niece David H.R. Campbell and Virginia Campbell.

== Career ==
Campbell was a successful merchant in Abingdon, Virginia. He served in the U.S. Army during the War of 1812 and was Captain in the Virginia militia and aide-de-Camp to Governor James Barbour during that conflict. He was National Guard Brigadier General of the 3rd Virginia brigade and Colonel of the 3rd Virginia Cavalry.

Campbell also served as deputy clerk of Washington County from 1802 to 1812. He later won election as Clerk of Washington County (one of three countywide elective offices) and served until 1837.

After the 1820 census, voters in Washington and surrounding Lee, Scott, Russell, and Tazewell counties elected him to represent them (part-time) in the Virginia Senate, where he succeeded Francis Preston (who also represented several other growing counties). Senator Campbell served one term (until 1824) and was replaced by John D. Sharp.

As governor Campbell unsuccessfully advocated creating a statewide system of compulsory education. He called a special session of the General Assembly that helped Virginia weather the financial Panic of 1837. After his term as Virginia's governor ended, he served as justice of the peace in Washington County. Two men of the same name enslaved people in Washington County in 1840. Although Virginia's state slave schedules for that county in 1850 also show a David Campbell as an enslaver, such records are unavailable online. The federal census slave schedule was either lost or missing.

== Death and legacy ==
Campbell died in Abingdon on March 19, 1859, and was survived by his widow for six months. Both are buried in Abingdon's Sinking Spring Cemetery. The Library of Virginia maintains his executive papers.

Political offices
Preceded by Wyndham Robertson; Acting Governor	Governor of Virginia; 1837–1840	Succeeded by Thomas Walker Gilmer
