= Patrick Henry High School (Glade Spring, Virginia) =

Public high school in Virginia, US

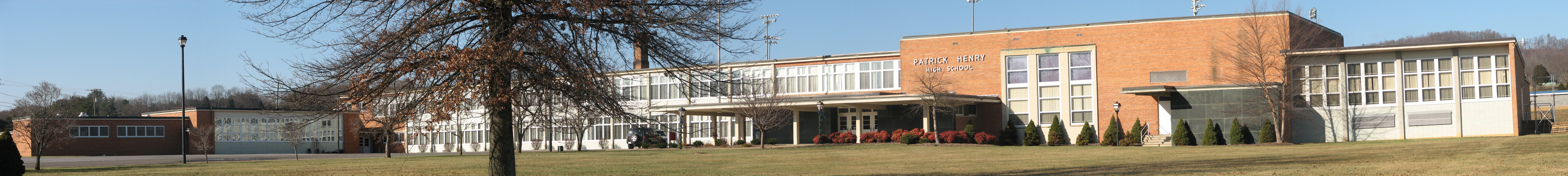

Location
- 31437 Hillman Highway; Glade Spring, Virginia 24340; United States; 36°46′31.4″N 81°48′50.8″W

Information
- School type: Public high school
- Founded: 1960
- School district: Washington County School Division
- Superintendent: Dr. Keith Perrigan
- Principal: Dr. Tim Duncan
- Staff: 30 14:1 Student:Teacher
- Grades: 9–12
- Enrollment: 427 (2016-17)
- Student to teacher ratio: 14:1
- Language: English Glade Spring, Virginia Meadowview, Virginia
- Colors: Navy and Columbia blue
- Athletics conference: VHSL Class 1 VHSL Region D VHSL Hogoheegee District
- Mascot: Rebels
- Feeder schools: Glade Spring Middle School; Meadowview Elementary School
- Website: phhs.wcs.k12.va.us

Patrick Henry High School is a public high school in Glade Spring, Virginia. It was built in 1960 as a result of the consolidation of Glade Spring High School and Meadowview High School and named after Founding Father Patrick Henry. The school is located on a 32 acre campus in Glade Spring, Virginia.

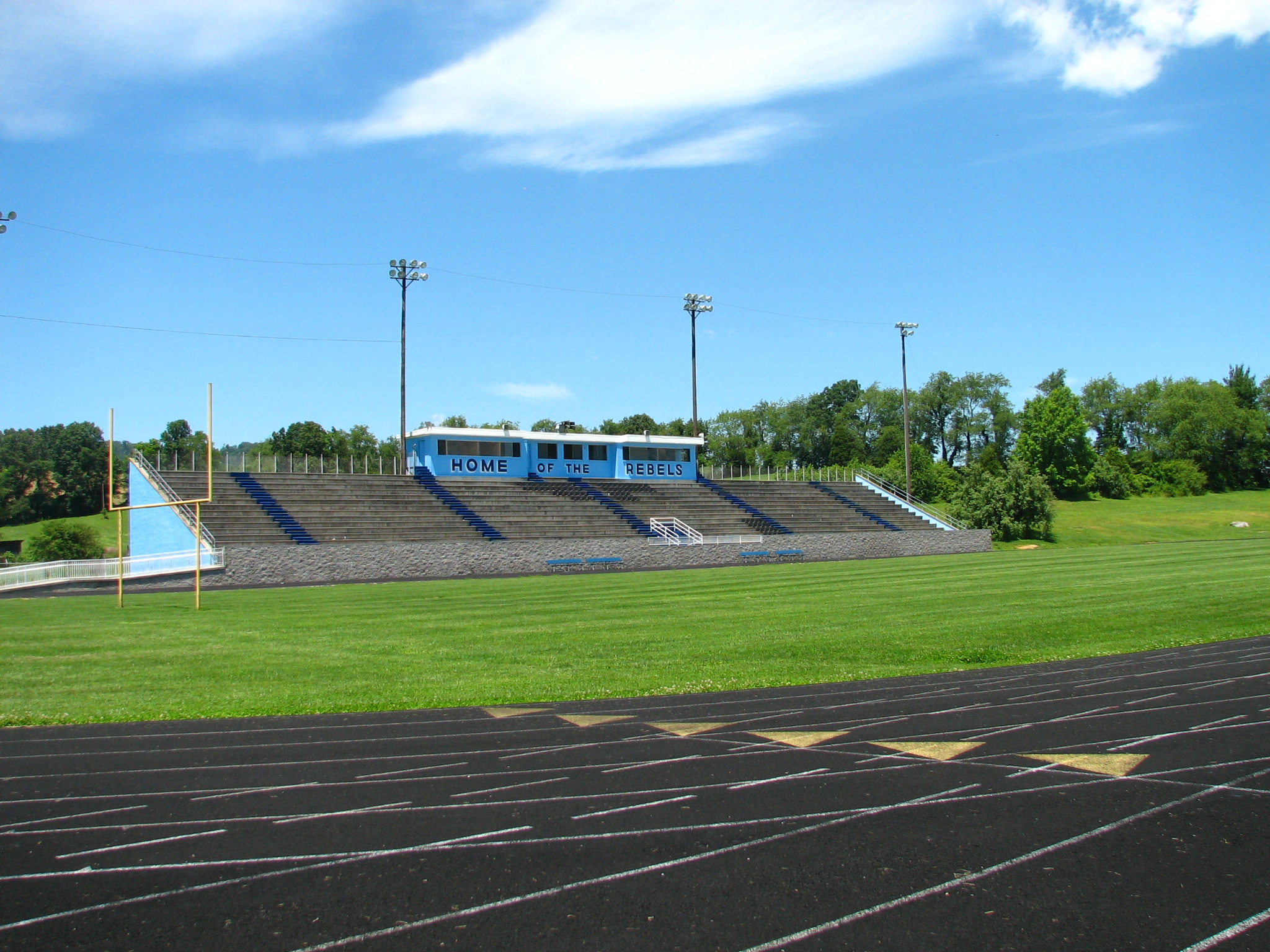
PH football field

.

== Clubs & Organizations ==
- Rebel Rampage Club
- Drama Club
- FBLA (Future Business Leaders of America)
- FCA (Fellowship of Christian Athletes)
- FFA (Future Farmers of America)
- Classics Club
- Heritage Club
- Key Club
- National Honor Society
- Science Club
- 4-H Club
- The Patrick Henry Athenaeum
- The Rowdy Rebel Club
- Book Club
- The Guitar Club
- Kickball Club
- Archery Club
- The Gifted And Talented Education Program (GATE)

== Education - Scores ==
Patrick Henry High is recognized in the National Rankings as a top 10% High School in the Country; and earned a Bronze-Medal for this recognition. Schools are ranked based on their performance on state-required tests and how well they prepare students for college. Patrick Henry High School ranks in the top 3,000 schools in the country. Patrick Henry High School first received this award in 2015. The school has a 100% graduation rate and 38% of students are in at least one AP course.

Subject	% Proficient	
English Reading	97%	State avg: 89%
Biology I	95%	State avg: 84%
Earth Science	97%	State avg: 84%
Geometry	95%	State avg: 80%
Algebra I	98%	State avg: 83%
Writing	90%	State avg: 83%
Algebra II	96%	State avg: 89%
Chemistry	87%	State avg: 88%
World History I	100%	State avg: 84%
World History II	93%	State avg: 87%
VA and US History	93%	State avg: 86%

== Athletics ==
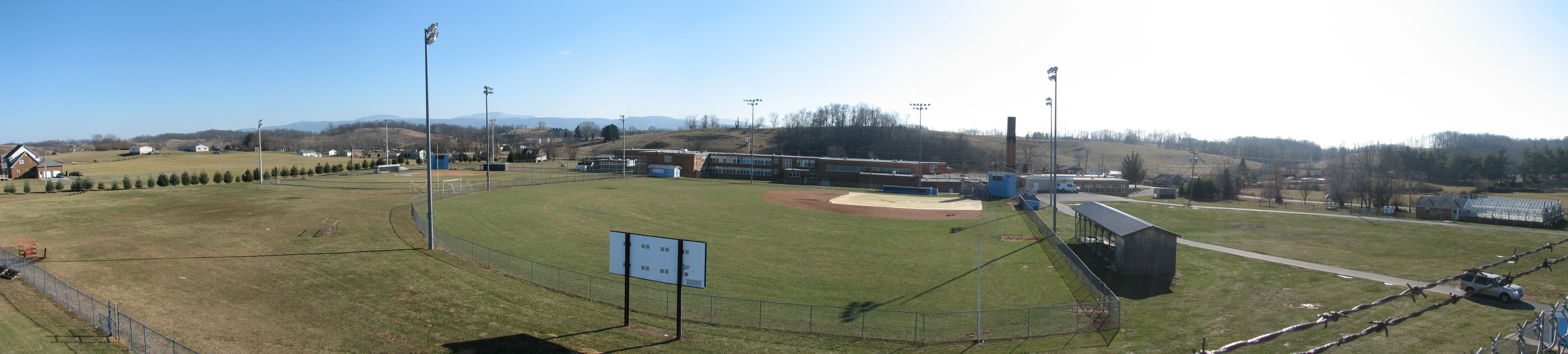
View of Patrick Henry's athletic fields

Patrick Henry competed in the Southwest District and Highlands District before moving to the Hogoheegee District in 1989, due to declining student enrollment.

Patrick Henry currently offers the following sports:

- Baseball
- Basketball (Men's and Women's)
- Cheerleading
- Cross Country - Girls State Champs in 1991
- Football
- Golf
- Soccer
- Softball - State Runner-up 2017
- Swimming
- Track and Field - Girls State Champs in 1996; Boys State Champs 2017
- Volleyball - State Champs 2018
- Wrestling
- Scholastic Bowl

== Notable alumni ==
- Israel O'Quinn - Virginia President, 6th District, 1998 graduate
