= Brook Hall (Virginia) =

Historic house in Virginia, United States

- U.S. National Register of Historic Places
- Virginia Landmarks Register
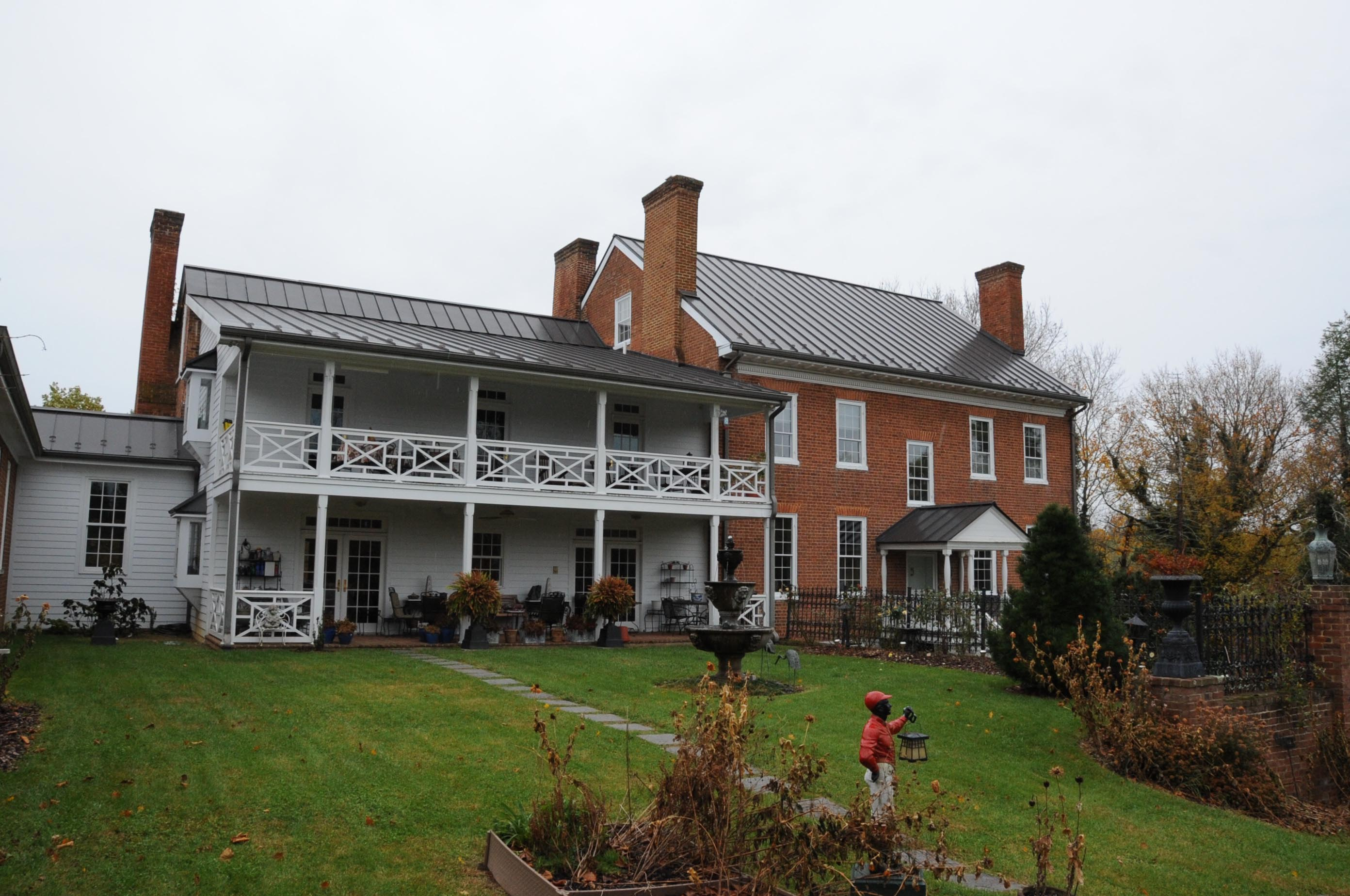

- Location within Virginia Location within the United States
- Location: 13160 Byars Ln., Glade Spring, Virginia
- Coordinates: 36°45′42″N 81°48′10″W
- Area: 15.7 acres (6.4 ha)
- Built: 1830
- Architectural style: Federal
- NRHP reference No.: 97000490
- VLR No.: 095-0004

Significant dates
- Added to NRHP: June 5, 1997
- Designated VLR: March 19, 1997

Brook Hall is a historic home located at Glade Spring, Washington County, Virginia. It was built about 1830, and is a large two-story, five-bay, "T" plan, Federal style brick dwelling. The house has a four-bay, two-story brick wing. The interior retains spectacular carved woodwork as well as very early, possibly original, paint on woodgrained doors and marbled mantels and baseboards. Also on the property is a contributing spring house.

It was listed on the National Register of Historic Places in 1997. It is currently for sell.
