= Walnut Grove (Bristol, Virginia) =

Historic house in Virginia, United States

- U.S. National Register of Historic Places
- Virginia Landmarks Register
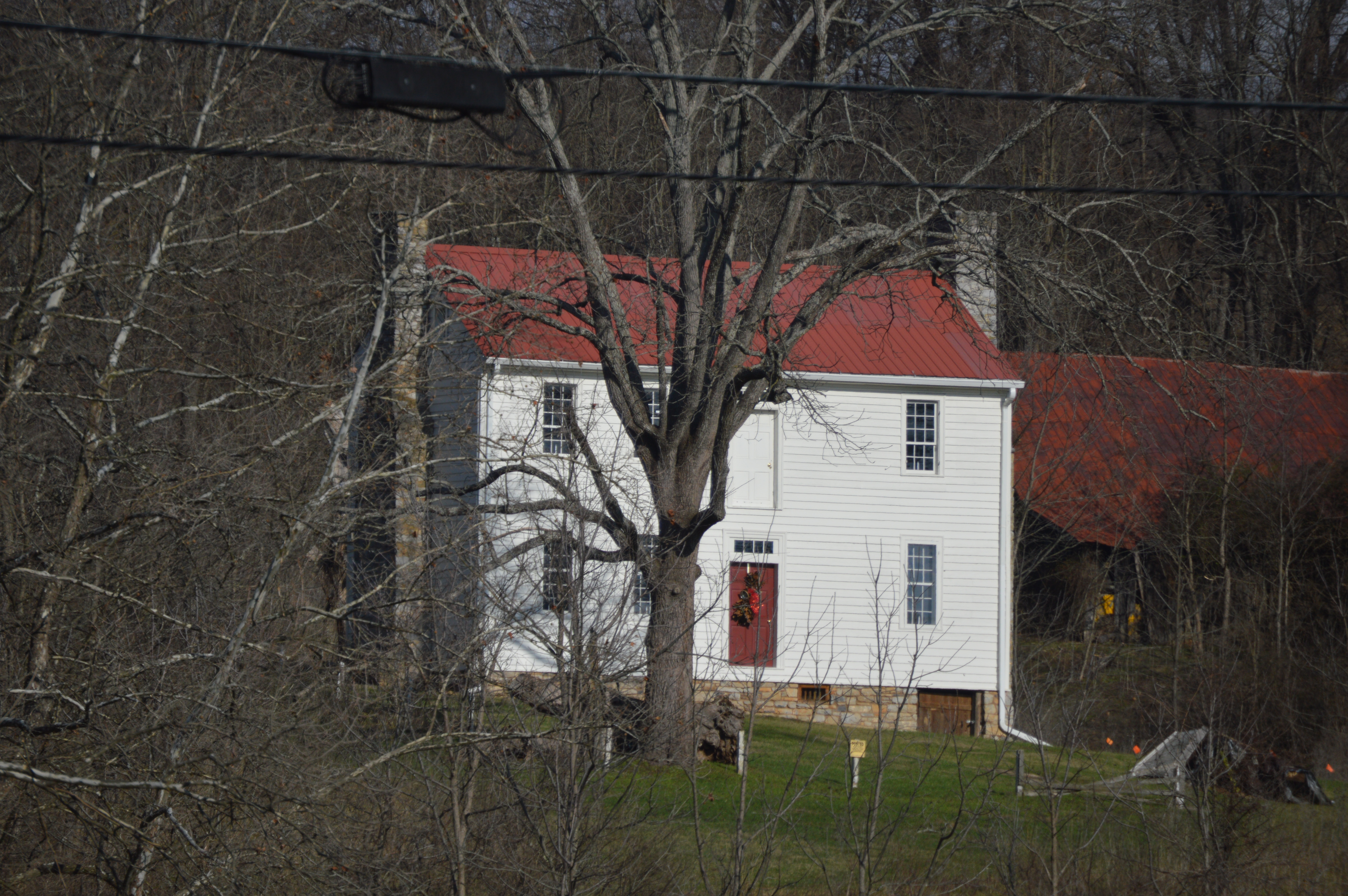
- Front and western end

- Location within Virginia Location within the United States
- Location: 14081 U.S. Route 11, Bristol, Virginia
- Coordinates: 36°38′15.5″N 82°7′6″W
- Area: Less than 1 acre (0.40 ha)
- Built: c. 1815
- Architectural style: Georgian
- NRHP reference No.: 04000840
- VLR No.: 095-0022

Significant dates
- Added to NRHP: August 11, 2004
- Designated VLR: June 16, 2004

Walnut Grove, also known as the Robert Preston House, is a historic plantation house located just outside Bristol in Washington County, Virginia. It was built about 1815, and is a two-story, Georgian style timber-frame dwelling covered with wood weatherboard. The house has a gable roof and has a one-story full-width porch. The Grove was built on the Walnut Grove property in 1857.

It was listed on the National Register of Historic Places in 2004.
