= Emory, Virginia =

Emory
- CDP
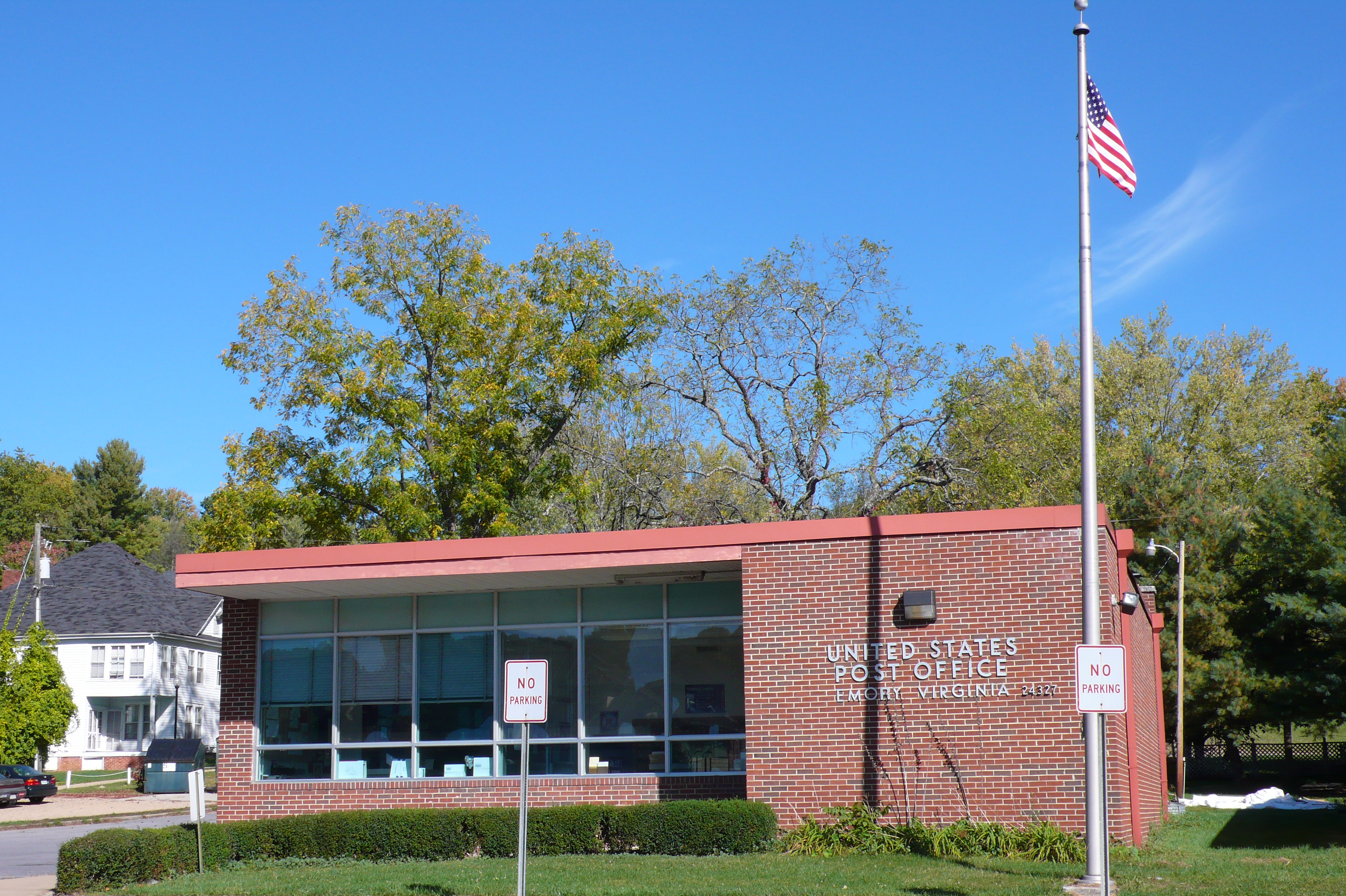
- The Post Office in Emory, Virginia

- Location within the Commonwealth of Virginia
- Coordinates: 36°47′19″N 81°49′43″W
- Country: United States
- State: Virginia
- County: Washington

Population (2020)
  - Total: 1,237
- Time zone: UTC−5 (Eastern (EST))
  - Summer (DST): UTC−4 (EDT)
- ZIP codes: 24327, 24340, 24361
- FIPS code: 51-25792
- GNIS feature ID: 2584842

Emory is a census-designated place (CDP) in Washington County, Virginia, United States. The population was 1,237 at the 2020 census down from 1,251 at the 2010 census. The community is named for and is the location of Emory and Henry University.

It is part of the Kingsport-Bristol-Bristol, TN-VA MSA, which is a component of the Johnson City–Kingsport–Bristol, TN-VA Combined Statistical Area – commonly known as the "Tri-Cities" region.

The Emory post office was established in 1847.

== Demographics ==
Historical population
Census	Pop.	Note	%±
2020	1,237		—
U.S. Decennial Census; 2010 2020

Emory was first listed as a census designated place in the 2010 U.S. census formed along with the Meadow View CDP out of the deleted Emory-Meadow View CDP.

== Notable person ==
- Frankie Newton (1906 – 1954) – jazz trumpeter from the 1920s onwards
