= Bethel, Washington County, Virginia =

Unincorporated community in Virginia, US

Coordinates: 36°40′31″N 81°52′40″W

Bethel is an unincorporated community in Washington County, in the U.S. state of Virginia.
