= Glade Spring Commercial Historic District =

Historic district in Virginia, United States

- U.S. National Register of Historic Places
- U.S. Historic district
- Virginia Landmarks Register
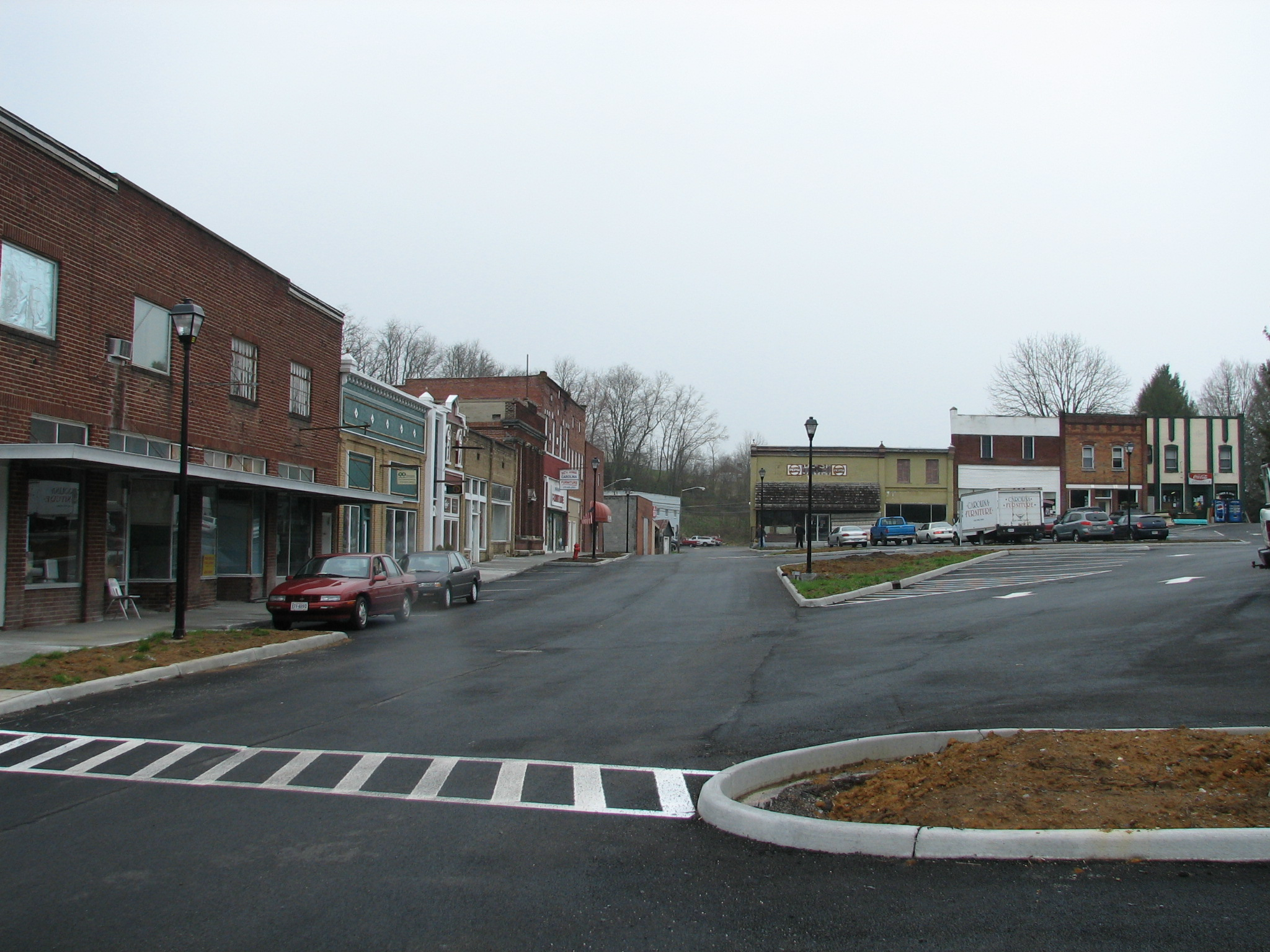

- Location within Virginia Location within the United States
- Nearest city: Glade Spring, Virginia
- Coordinates: 36°47′25″N 81°46′24″W
- Built: 1866–1962
- Architectural style: Commercial style, Greek Revival, Colonial Revival, Classical Revival
- NRHP reference No.: 13000345
- VLR No.: 222-0001

Significant dates
- Added to NRHP: May 28, 2013
- Designated VLR: March 21, 2013

Glade Spring Commercial Historic District is the downtown core of the Town of Glade Spring, a community of 1,500 residents in northeastern Washington County, Virginia, less than three miles southwest of the Smyth County line. Located on the gently rolling floor of the Valley of Virginia (trending southwest–northeast), the town is surrounded by agricultural lands interspersed with clumps of woodland. The rugged southwest end of Walker Mountain is one mile to the northwest and Little Mountain four miles farther; the Iron Mountains define the opposite side of the Valley about seven miles to the southeast. On May 28, 2013, the "Town Square" was listed on the National Register of Historic Places.

The Glade Spring Commercial Historic District includes twenty-four primary resources and two secondary resources. Of the twenty-four primary resources, twenty-one are contributing and three are non-contributing to the eligibility of the historic district. Primary resources include sixteen commercial buildings (only three of which are noncontributing), one warehouse, one bank, one office building, one hotel, one meeting hall, one town hall, one post office, and one multiple dwelling. Secondary resources consist of one walkway and one shed (both contributing).
