= Mendota, Virginia =

Unincorporated community in Virginia, US

Coordinates: 36°42′39″N 82°18′06″W

Mendota
- Census-designated place
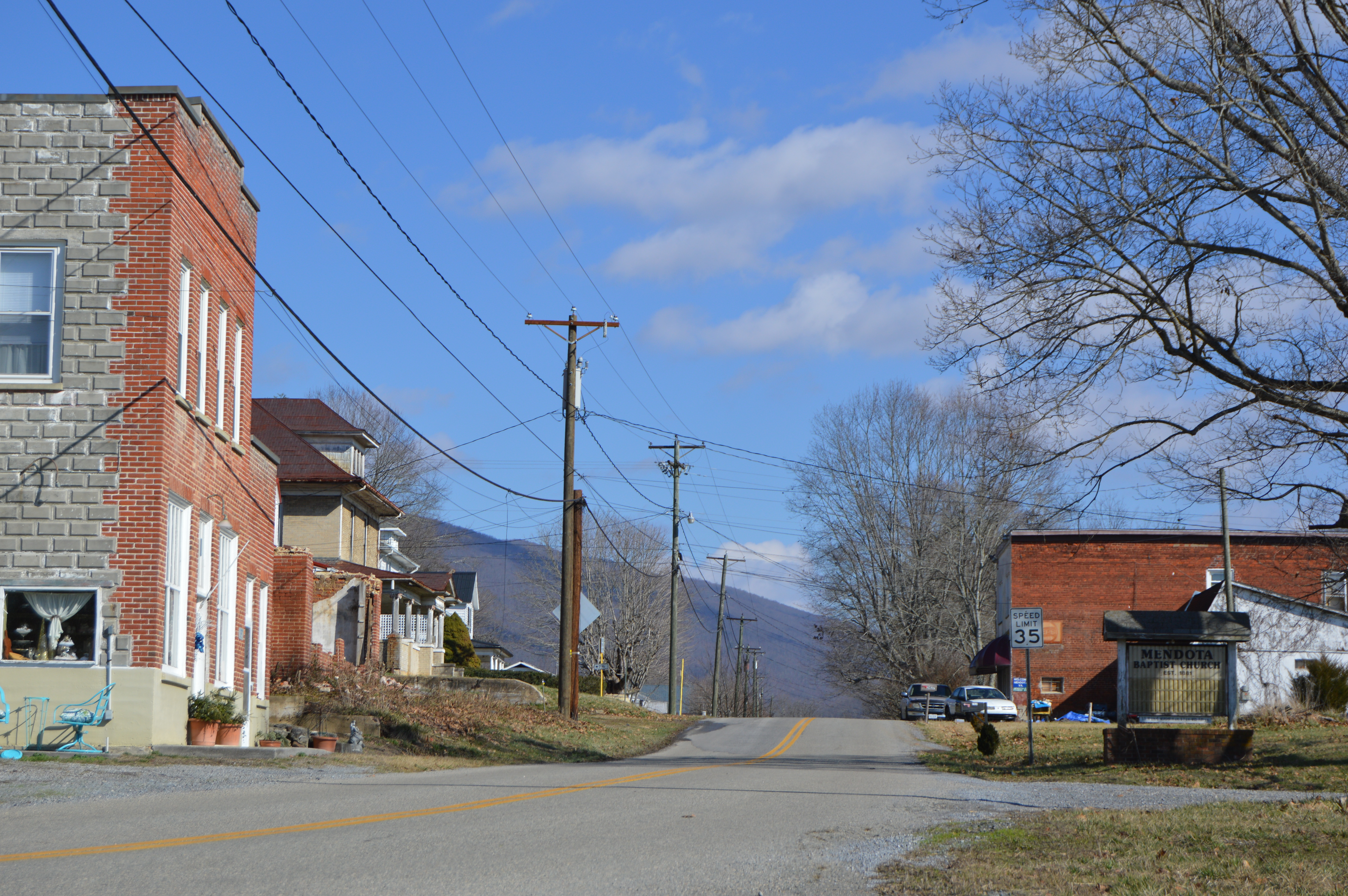
- Mendota's main street

- Location within Virginia Location within the United States
- Country: United States
- State: Virginia
- Counties: Washington
- Elevation: 1,411 ft (430 m)

Population (2020)
  - Total: 135
- Time zone: UTC-5 (Eastern (EST))
  - Summer (DST): UTC-4 (EDT)
- GNIS feature ID: 2807452

Mendota is an unincorporated community and census-designated place in Washington County in the southwestern part of the U.S. state of Virginia, at an elevation of approximately 1411 feet. It was first listed as a CDP in the 2020 census with a population of 135.

The name Mendota is derived from a Native American word meaning "bend in the river". The village is located on the north fork of the Holston River.

It is part of the Metropolitan Statistical Area, which is a component of the Johnson City-Kingsport-Bristol, TN-VA Combined Statistical Area – commonly known as the "Tri-Cities" region.

== Demographics ==
Mendota first appeared as a census designated place in the 2020 U.S. census.
