= Holston, Virginia =

Unincorporated community in Virginia, US

Coordinates: 36°46′38″N 82°04′58″W

Holston is an unincorporated community in Washington County, Virginia, United States.

== History ==
A post office was established at Holston in 1831, and remained in operation until it was discontinued in 1966. Legend has it Holston was named for Stephen Holstein, a pioneer explorer.
