= Glade Spring, Virginia =

Glade Spring
- Town
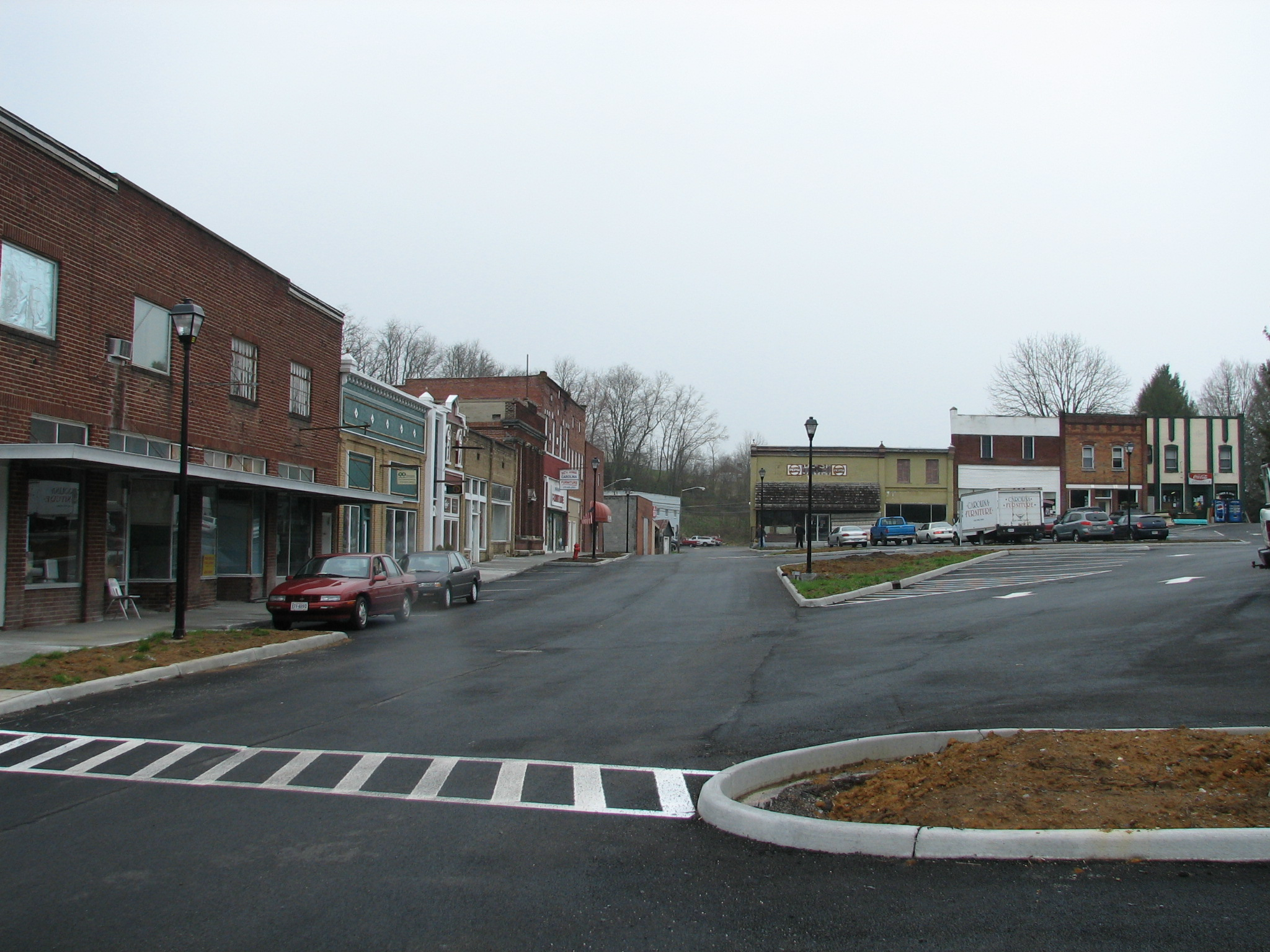

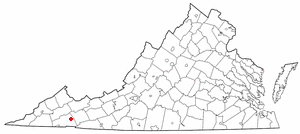
- Location of Glade Spring, Virginia
- Coordinates: 36°47′25″N 81°46′24″W
- Country: United States
- State: Virginia
- County: Washington
- Incorporated: 1875

Government
  - Mayor: Leigh Ann Lloyd

Area
  - Total: 1.22 sq mi (3.15 km^{2})
  - Land: 1.22 sq mi (3.15 km^{2})
  - Water: 0 sq mi (0.00 km^{2})
- Elevation: 2,087 ft (636 m)

Population (2020)
  - Total: 1,367
  - Estimate (2019): 1,406
  - Density: 1,156.6/sq mi (446.57/km^{2})
- Time zone: UTC−5 (Eastern (EST))
  - Summer (DST): UTC−4 (EDT)
- ZIP Code: 24340
- Area code: 276
- FIPS code: 51-31056
- GNIS feature ID: 1483656
- Website: gladespringva.org

Glade Spring is a town in Washington County, Virginia, United States. As of the 2020 census, Glade Spring had a population of 1,367. It is part of the Kingsport–Bristol (TN)–Bristol (VA) Metropolitan Statistical Area, which is a component of the Johnson City–Kingsport–Bristol, TN-VA Combined Statistical Area – commonly known as the "Tri-Cities" region. I-81 runs through Glade Spring. It is located at exit 29.

== History ==
The original name of Glade Spring derives from the Indian word Passawatami which means "this is the place". According to early records, near the town is a field where Native American tribes held a type of Olympics in the fall, with athletic competitions, dancing and socializing. The Porterfield family, who arrived about 1760, were some of the earliest permanent settlers.

During its first years, the town was called Glade Spring Depot to differentiate it from the community centered on Glade Spring Presbyterian Church, two miles to the southwest on the old stage road, now U.S. Route 11. The post office was moved from Old Glade to Glade Spring Depot in 1856 due to the arrival of the railroad.

The Civil War slowed its growth, and local men made up a military unit called The Glade Spring Rifles. Federal and Confederate troops passed through the town several times, and cannon emplacements can still be seen just outside Glade Spring on the road to Saltville. Although a few new buildings were constructed before the Civil War, most of the town's growth occurred rapidly in the decade after the war.

With the railroad access, Glade Spring turned into a prime shipping yard for produce, livestock and other local goods. An Abingdon newspaper first took note of the "stirring, thriving, wide-awake community" in 1870. By the time Glade Spring was incorporated in 1875, there were 31 houses (three were brick), six stores, two hotels, and a Masonic Hall. Virginia Intermont College was located in Glade from 1884 to 1892, before it moved to a location in Bristol.

After the passenger train service discontinued, the town's growth slowed, although it still receives freight service from Norfolk Southern railway. The train tracks of the 8.91 "Saltville Branch", which connected to Saltville via a junction from the main line at Glade Spring, have been removed and replaced with a hiking and biking trail called the "Salt Trail".

In the early morning hours of April 28, 2011, an EF-3 tornado hit parts of the Glade Spring area, killing three people and injuring 50 others. Another person died in a traffic accident during the storm. The system that hit Glade Spring was part of the 2011 Super Outbreak that caused hundreds of deaths and widespread damage all across the South.

Brook Hall and the Glade Spring Commercial Historic District are listed on the National Register of Historic Places.

== Geography ==
Glade Spring is located at 36°47′25″N 81°46′24″W (36.790338, -81.773220).

According to the United States Census Bureau, the town has a total area of 1.3 square miles (3.3 km^{2}), all land.

The elevation is 2,087 ft above sea level.

== Demographics ==
Historical population
Census	Pop.	Note	%±
1880	262		—
1890	500		90.8%
1900	304		−39.2%
1910	324		6.6%
1920	281		−13.3%
1930	669		138.1%
1940	686		2.5%
1950	827		20.6%
1960	1,407		70.1%
1970	1,615		14.8%
1980	1,722		6.6%
1990	1,435		−16.7%
2000	1,374		−4.3%
2010	1,456		6.0%
2020	1,367		−6.1%

As of the census of 2000, there were 1,374 people, 565 households, and 402 families residing in the town. The population density was 1,093.4 inhabitants per square mile (422.2/km^{2}). There were 626 housing units at an average density of 498.2 per square mile (192.4/km^{2}). The racial makeup of the town was 92.36% White, 7.06% African American, 0.07% Native American, 0.15% Asian, 0.22% from other races, and 0.15% from two or more races. Hispanic or Latino of any race were 0.07% of the population.

There were 565 households, out of which 27.8% had children under the age of 18 living with them, 54.9% were married couples living together, 13.5% had a female householder with no husband present, and 28.7% were non-families. 26.5% of all households were made up of individuals, and 15.9% had someone living alone who was 65 years of age or older. The average household size was 2.43 and the average family size was 2.96.

In the town, the population was spread out, with 22.9% under the age of 18, 7.1% from 18 to 24, 26.3% from 25 to 44, 25.5% from 45 to 64, and 18.2% who were 65 years of age or older. The median age was 41 years. For every 100 females, there were 85.7 males. For every 100 females age 18 and over, there were 85.0 males.

The median income for a household in the town was $31,552, and the median income for a family was $36,902. Males had a median income of $27,847 versus $20,982 for females. The per capita income for the town was $16,842. About 8.1% of families and 9.4% of the population were below the poverty line, including 11.9% of those under age 18 and 13.1% of those age 65 or over.

== Gallery ==
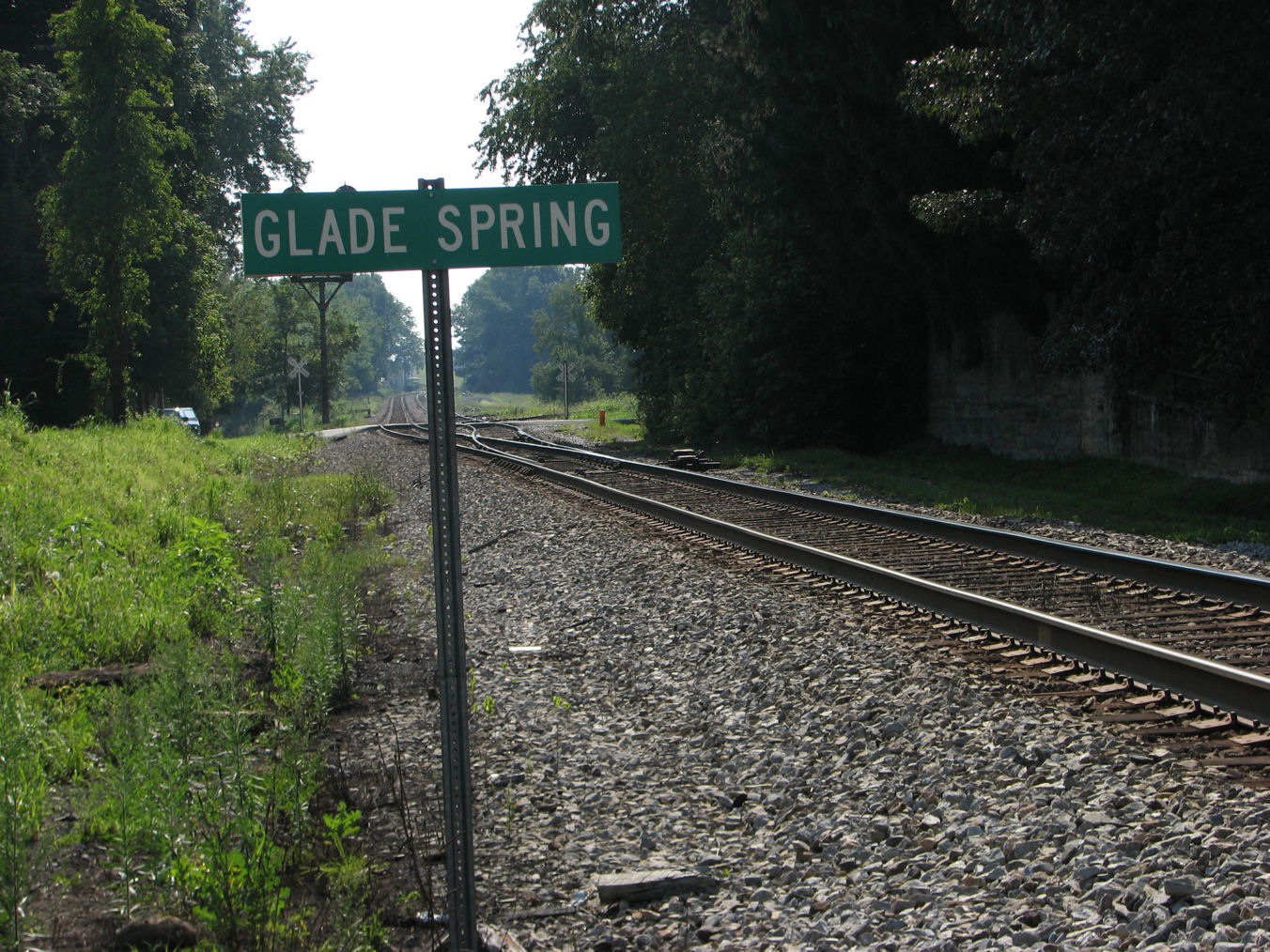
Railroad tracks immediately adjacent to Glade Spring town square.

Park named in the honor of Leo "Muscle" Shoals

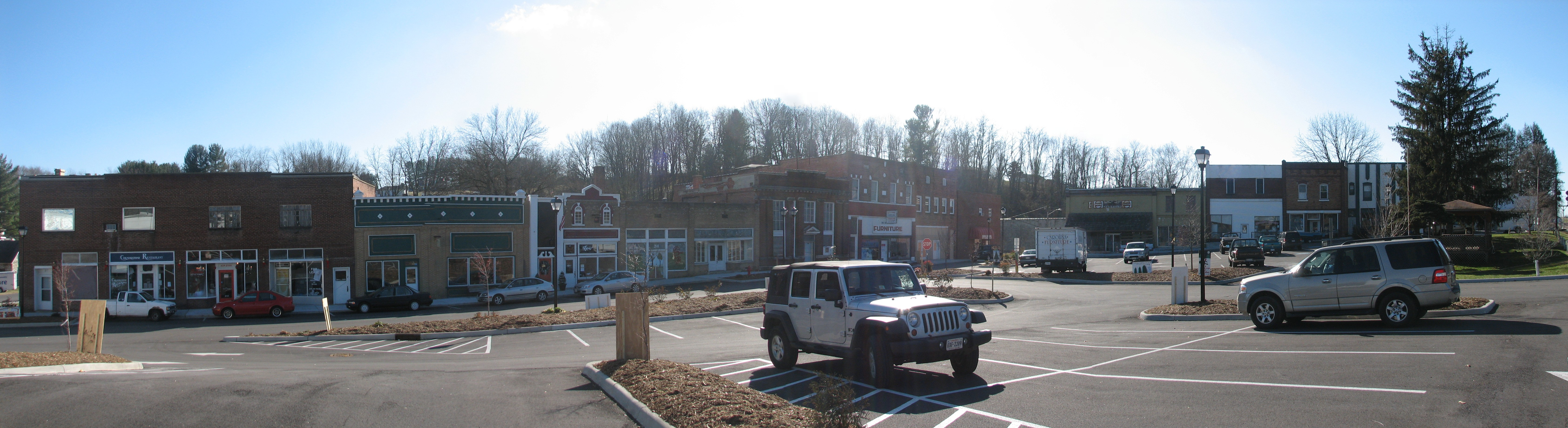
Another view of the town square.

== Education ==
- Patrick Henry High School

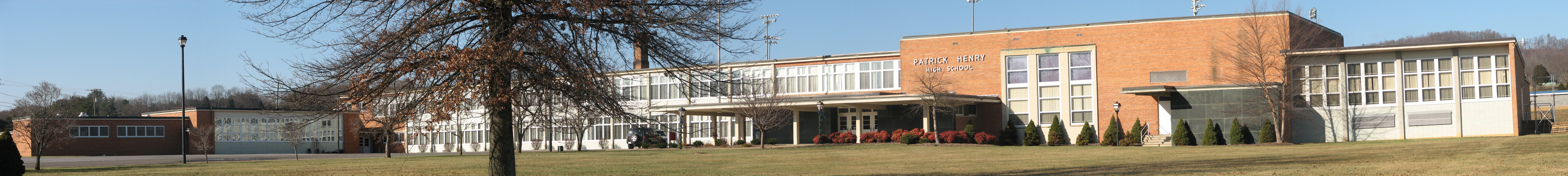
Patrick Henry High School

- Glade Spring Middle School was built in 1968 and then modified to meet middle school specifications in 1991. It is one of four middle schools in Washington County. According to the GSMS homepage , the school has almost 400 students and employs 45 teachers and staff.

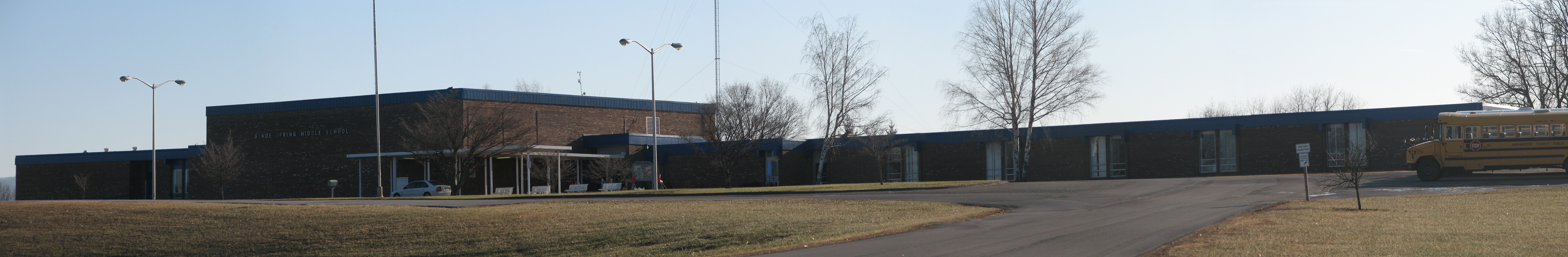
Glade Spring Middle School

== Notable people ==
- Fred C. Allison (1882–1974), was an American physicist.
- William "Grumble" Jones (1824–1864), a Confederate General, was born near Glade Spring and is buried in the Old Glade Spring Presbyterian Church graveyard.
- Robert Porterfield (1905–1971), founder of Barter Theatre, lived in Glade Spring at the Porterfield farm known as "Twin Oaks".
- John E. Reinhardt (1920–2016), ambassador to Nigeria, Assistant Secretary of State for Public Affairs, and director of the United States Information Agency.
- Mary Scheier (1908–2007), was internationally known for her superbly thrown pottery vessels. In 1939, along with her husband Edwin, set up their first studio in Glade Spring.
- Leo "Muscle" Shoals (1916–1999), won the Minor League baseball Triple Crown in 1951 and hit a record 55 home runs in one season.
- Lefty Thomas (1903–1952), pitched parts of two seasons for the Washington Senators.

== See also ==
- National Register of Historic Places listings in Washington County, Virginia
