= Lindell, Virginia =

Unincorporated community in Virginia, US

Coordinates: 36°48′16″N 81°54′02″W

Lindell is an unincorporated community in Washington County, in the U.S. state of Virginia.
