= The Grove (Bristol, Virginia) =

Historic house in Virginia, United States

- U.S. National Register of Historic Places
- Virginia Landmarks Register
- Location within Virginia Location within the United States
- Location: 14071 Lee Hwy, Bristol, Virginia
- Coordinates: 36°38′24″N 82°6′39″W
- Area: 4.2 acres (1.7 ha)
- Built: 1857
- Built by: Preston, John
- Architectural style: Greek Revival
- NRHP reference No.: 02000525
- VLR No.: 095-0021

Significant dates
- Added to NRHP: May 16, 2002
- Designated VLR: September 12, 2001

The Grove, also known as The Children's Advocacy Center of Bristol and Washington County, is a historic home located just outside Bristol in Washington County, Virginia. It was built in 1857, on the Walnut Grove tract. It is a two-story, five-bay, brick Greek Revival style dwelling with a kitchen wing. The house has a gable roof and features a two-story wood-framed front porch.

It was listed on the National Register of Historic Places in 2002.
