= Goose Pimple Junction, Virginia =

Unincorporated community in Virginia, US

Coordinates: 36°35′48″N 82°06′12″W

Goose Pimple Junction is an unincorporated community in Washington County, Virginia, United States.

== History ==
Goose Pimple Junction was so named when the domestic disputes of a couple in town were loud enough to give a neighbor goose pimples.

Goose Pimple Junction has frequently been noted on lists of unusual place names. Its road signs are a popular visitor attraction, and have been stolen by souvenir-hunting tourists at least a dozen times.
