= Emory-Meadowview, Virginia =

- former CDP
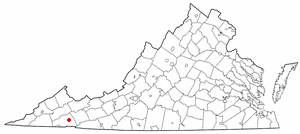
- Location of Emory-Meadowview, Virginia
- Coordinates: 36°46′19″N 81°50′14″W
- Country: United States
- State: Virginia
- County: Washington

Area
  - Total: 8.9 sq mi (23.0 km^{2})
  - Land: 8.9 sq mi (23.0 km^{2})
  - Water: 0 sq mi (0.0 km^{2})

Population (2000)
  - Total: 2,266
  - Density: 255/sq mi (98.6/km^{2})
- Time zone: UTC-5 (Eastern (EST))
  - Summer (DST): UTC-4 (EDT)
- FIPS code: 51-25800

Emory-Meadowview was a census-designated place (CDP) in Washington County, Virginia, United States. The population was 2,266 at the 2000 census. It is part of the Kingsport–Bristol (TN)–Bristol (VA) Metropolitan Statistical Area, which is a component of the Johnson City–Kingsport–Bristol, TN-VA Combined Statistical Area – commonly known as the "Tri-Cities" region. As of the 2010 census it was split into Emory and Meadow View CDPs.

== Geography ==
Emory-Meadowview is located at 36°46′19″N 81°50′14″W (36.771955, -81.837249).

According to the United States Census Bureau, the CDP has a total area of 8.9 square miles (23.0 km^{2}), all of it land.

== Demographics ==
Historical population
Census	Pop.	Note	%±
1990	2,248		—
2000	2,266		0.8%

As of the census of 2000, there were 2,266 people, 652 households, and 474 families residing in the CDP. The population density was 255.2 inhabitants per square mile (98.5/km^{2}). There were 712 housing units at an average density of 80.2 per square mile (31.0/km^{2}). The racial makeup of the CDP was 93.56% White, 4.06% African American, 1.02% Asian, 0.26% Pacific Islander, 0.26% from other races, and 0.84% from two or more races. Hispanic or Latino of any race were 0.44% of the population.

There were 652 households, out of which 30.1% had children under the age of 18 living with them, 62.0% were married couples living together, 7.7% had a female householder with no husband present, and 27.3% were non-families. 23.0% of all households were made up of individuals, and 10.0% had someone living alone who was 65 years of age or older. The average household size was 2.47 and the average family size was 2.91.

In the CDP, the population was spread out, with 15.3% under the age of 18, 32.7% from 18 to 24, 19.7% from 25 to 44, 20.5% from 45 to 64, and 11.8% who were 65 years of age or older. The median age was 27 years. For every 100 females, there were 96.0 males. For every 100 females age 18 and over, there were 92.1 males.

The median income for a household in the CDP was $31,250, and the median income for a family was $35,417. Males had a median income of $25,500 versus $16,689 for females. The per capita income for the CDP was $15,750. About 12.9% of families and 15.2% of the population were below the poverty line, including 21.2% of those under age 18 and 13.5% of those age 65 or over.
