= Crabtree–Blackwell Farm =

- U.S. National Register of Historic Places
- Virginia Landmarks Register
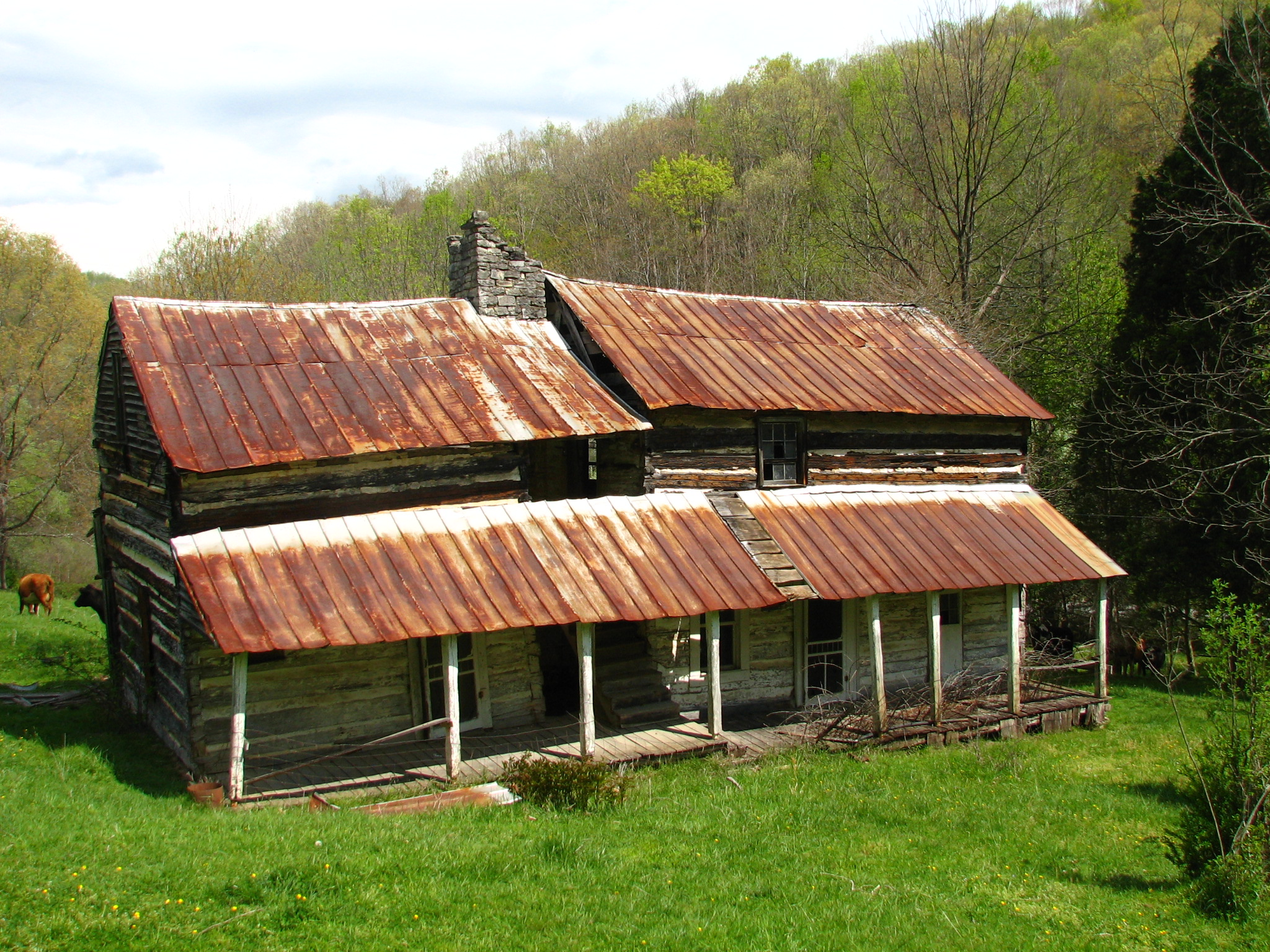
- Crabtree–Blackwell Farm, April 2011

- Location within Virginia Location within the United States
- Location: 1 mi. S of Blackwell on SR 686, near Blackwell, Virginia
- Coordinates: 36°49′01″N 81°51′09″W
- Area: 82 acres (33 ha)
- Architectural style: Appalachian vernacular
- NRHP reference No.: 75002041
- VLR No.: 095-0076

Significant dates
- Added to NRHP: April 1, 1975
- Designated VLR: December 17, 1974

Crabtree–Blackwell Farm is a historic farm located near Blackwell, Washington County, Virginia. The main house is a "saddlebag" type building with 2 1/2-story pens connected by a central limestone rubble chimney stack. The remaining Appalachian vernacular contributing resources are a spring house or milkhouse and log hay barn. The farm is representative of mountain folk culture.

It was listed on the National Register of Historic Places in 1975.
