= Clinchburg, Virginia =

Unincorporated community in Virginia, US

Coordinates: 36°49′55″N 81°48′52″W

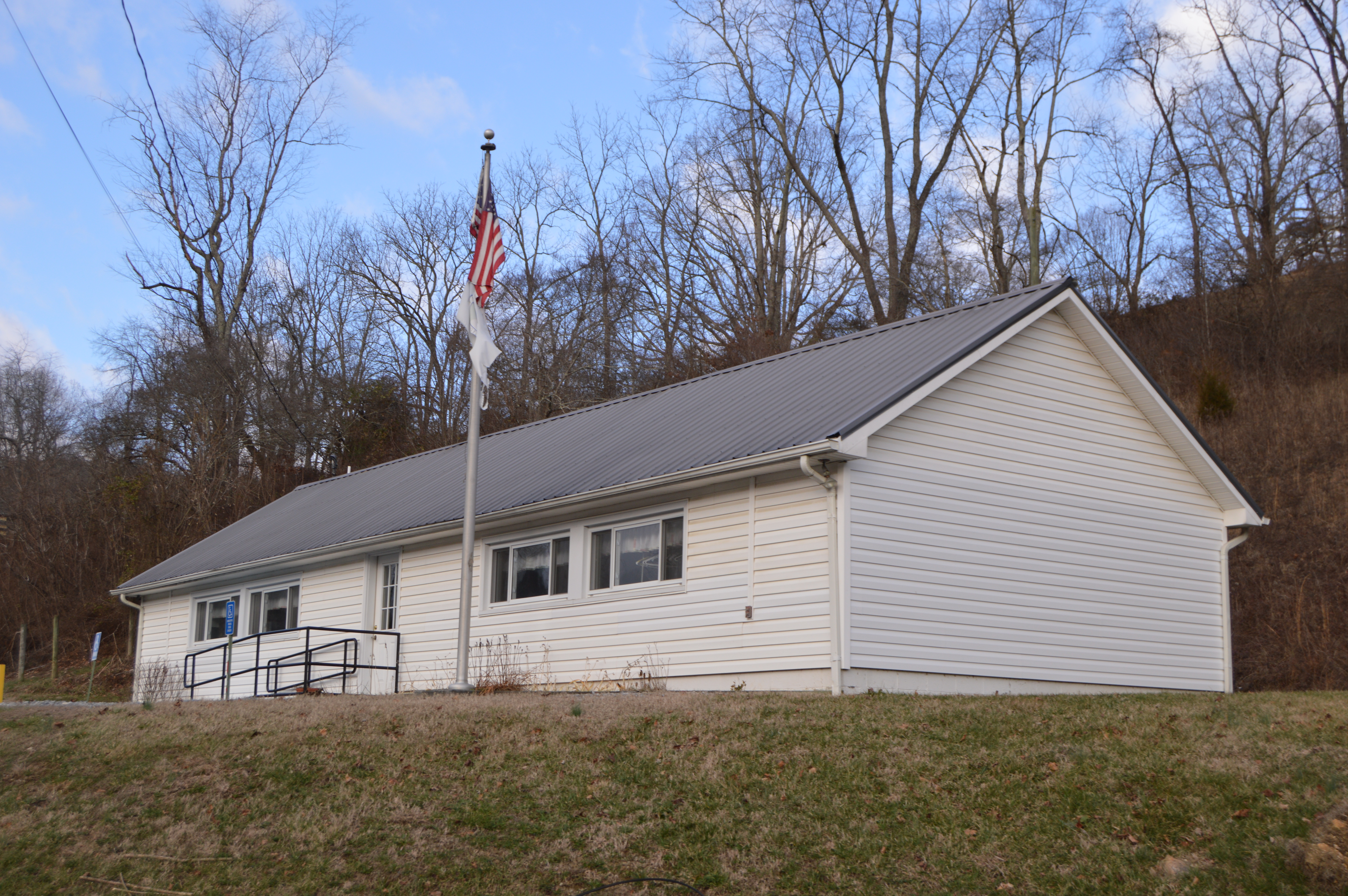
Community center

Clinchburg is an unincorporated community in Washington County, in the U.S. state of Virginia.
