= Friendship, Virginia =

Unincorporated community in Virginia, US

Coordinates: 36°43′48″N 81°44′29″W

Friendship is an unincorporated community in Washington County, in the U.S. state of Virginia.
