= Mont Calm =

Historic house in Virginia, United States

- U.S. National Register of Historic Places
- Virginia Landmarks Register
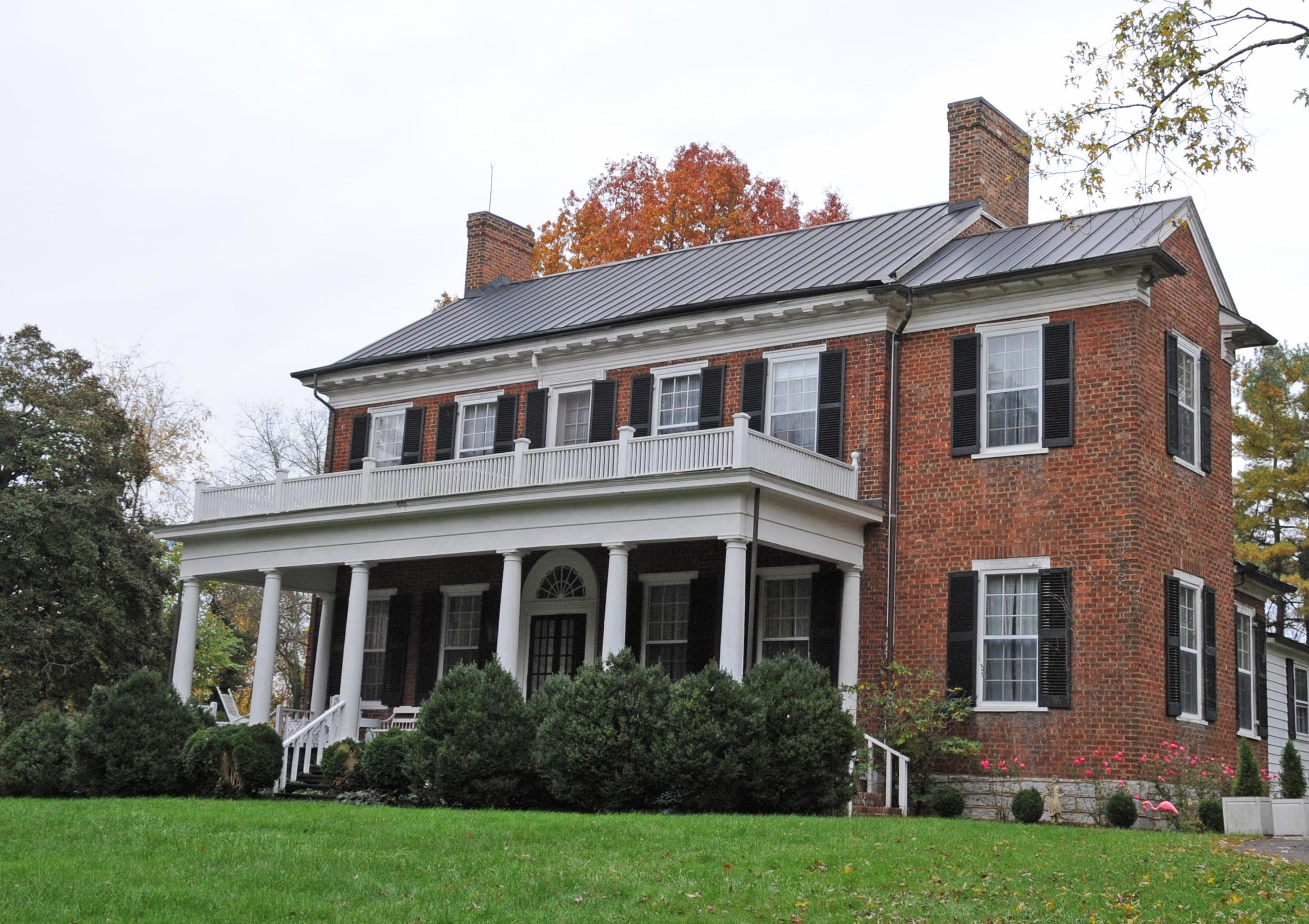

- Location within Virginia Location within the United States
- Location: W of VA 75, Abingdon, Virginia
- Coordinates: 36°42′25″N 81°58′25″W
- Area: 18 acres (7.3 ha)
- Built: 1827
- Architectural style: Federal
- NRHP reference No.: 74002148
- VLR No.: 140-0018

Significant dates
- Added to NRHP: July 18, 1974
- Designated VLR: January 15, 1974

Mont Calm — also known as Montcalm — is a historic house in Abingdon, Virginia, United States. It is a two-story, five-bay brick farmhouse constructed in the Federal style that dates back to 1827. Its two-story extension, which was added in approximately 1905, is 40 feet long and 30 feet broad. A standing seam metal gable roof covers the home, which has a limestone base. A porch with a shed roof and Tuscan order columns supports the front facade. Virginia Governor David Campbell lived there (1779–1859.

It was listed on the National Register of Historic Places in 1974.
