= Hayter, Virginia =

Unincorporated community in Virginia, US

Coordinates: 36°44′08″N 81°55′11″W

Hayter is an unincorporated community in Washington County, in the U.S. state of Virginia. It has an elevation of 2,149 ft (655 m).
