= Damascus, Virginia =

Damascus
- Town
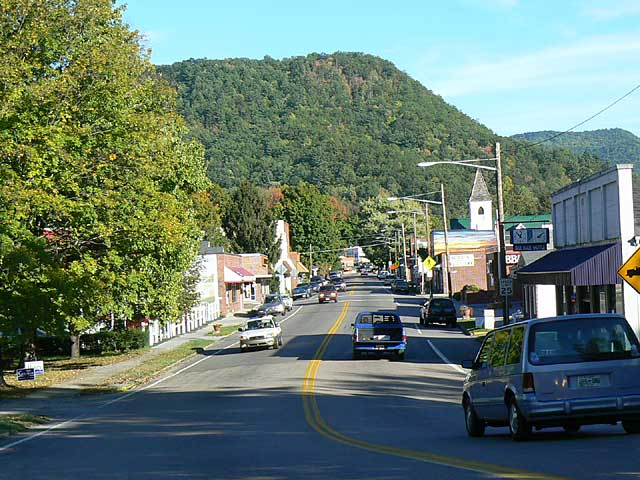
- U.S. Route 58 in Damascus
- Nickname: The Friendliest Town on the Trail
- Motto: The Strength of a Town Lies in the Confidence and Cooperation of Its People
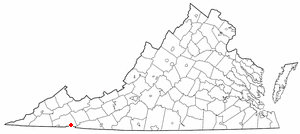
- Location of Damascus, Virginia
- Coordinates: 36°38′2″N 81°47′13″W
- Country: United States
- State: Virginia
- County: Washington
- Founded: 1904

Government
  - Mayor: Katie Lamb

Area
  - Total: 0.83 sq mi (2.14 km^{2})
  - Land: 0.80 sq mi (2.07 km^{2})
  - Water: 0.031 sq mi (0.08 km^{2})
- Elevation: 1,952 ft (595 m)

Population (2020)
  - Total: 788
  - Estimate (2019): 775
  - Density: 971.8/sq mi (375.22/km^{2})
- Time zone: UTC-5 (Eastern (EST))
  - Summer (DST): UTC-4 (EDT)
- ZIP code: 24236
- Area code: 276
- FIPS code: 51-21184
- GNIS feature ID: 1482904
- Website: Official website

Damascus is a small town in Washington County, Virginia, United States. As of the 2020 census, Damascus had a population of 788. It is part of the Kingsport–Bristol (TN)–Bristol (VA) Metropolitan Statistical Area, which is a component of the Johnson City–Kingsport–Bristol, TN-VA Combined Statistical Area (commonly known as the "Tri-Cities" region). The town suffered flooding and devastation as a result of Hurricane Helene in 2024.

== Festivals ==
Damascus is the home of the annual Trail Days festival and is known as Trail Town USA due to the convergence of five scenic trails in the town, including the Appalachian Trail, U.S. Bicycle Route 76, The Iron Mountain Trail, Virginia Creeper Trail and the MABDR motorcycle trail. Damascus also is on the route of the Daniel Boone Heritage Trail and the Crooked Road Music Heritage Trail. The Trail Days festival is held around the middle of May each year and draws in excess of 20,000 tourists, making it the largest single gathering of Appalachian Trail Hikers anywhere. During the festival's Hikers Parade on May 18, 2013, up to 60 people were injured when a car hit a crowd of people. Some victims were transported to area hospitals by ambulance or helicopters with some critically injured.

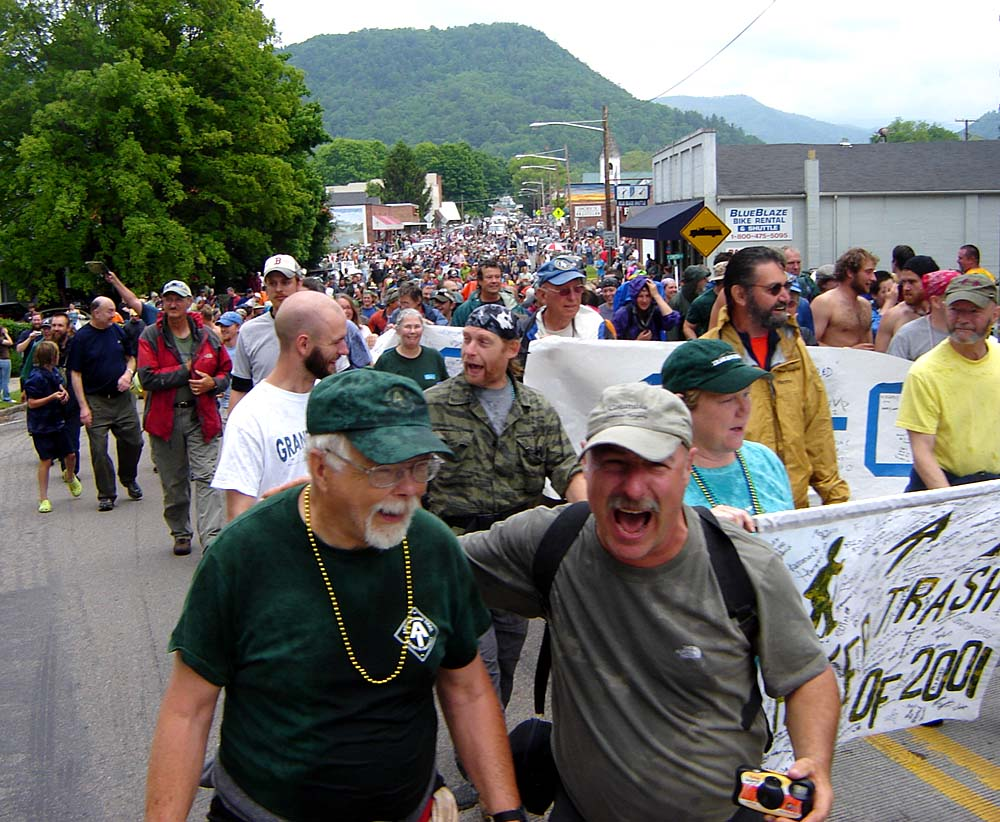
An Appalachian Trail Day in May

== Demographics ==
Historical population
| Census | Pop. | Note | %± |
|---|---|---|---|
| 1910 | 1,299 | | — |
| 1920 | 1,599 | | 23.1% |
| 1930 | 1,610 | | 0.7% |
| 1940 | 1,441 | | −10.5% |
| 1950 | 1,726 | | 19.8% |
| 1960 | 1,485 | | −14.0% |
| 1970 | 1,230 | | −17.2% |
| 1980 | 1,330 | | 8.1% |
| 1990 | 918 | | −31.0% |
| 2000 | 981 | | 6.9% |
| 2010 | 814 | | −17.0% |
| 2020 | 788 | | −3.2% |

As of the census of 2000, there were 981 people, 484 households, and 269 families living in the town. The population density was 1,157.2 inhabitants per square mile (446.8/km^{2}). There were 543 housing units at an average density of 640.5 per square mile (247.3/km^{2}). The racial makeup of the town was 96.94% White, 1.63% African American, 0.51% Native American, 0.31% Asian, 0.10% from other races, and 0.51% from two or more races. Hispanic or Latino of any race were 0.20% of the population.

There were 484 households, out of which 18.2% had children under the age of 18 living with them, 40.7% were married couples living together, 11.6% had a female householder with no husband present, and 44.4% were non-families. 40.9% of all households were made up of individuals, and 20.9% had someone living alone who was 65 years of age or older. The average household size was 2.03 and the average family size was 2.72.

In the town, the population was spread out, with 17.9% under the age of 18, 6.2% from 18 to 24, 25.4% from 25 to 44, 28.3% from 45 to 64, and 22.1% who were 65 years of age or older. The median age was 45 years. For every 100 females, there were 86.1 males. For every 100 females age 18 and over, there were 83.4 males.

The median income for a household in the town was $19,886, and the median income for a family was $29,250. Males had a median income of $25,500 versus $18,500 for females. The per capita income for the town was $14,995. About 13.2% of families and 20.0% of the population were below the poverty line, including 28.3% of those under age 18 and 16.5% of those age 65 or over.

== Climate ==
The climate in this area features moderate differences between highs and lows, and there is adequate rainfall year-round. According to the Köppen Climate Classification system, Damascus has a marine west coast climate, abbreviated "Cfb" on climate maps.

== History ==
On January 27, 2025, Vice President JD Vance and Governor Glenn Youngkin visited Damascus to meet with survivors of Hurricane Helene and review the recovery progress.
