= Blackwell, Virginia =

Unincorporated community in Virginia, US

Coordinates: 36°49′43″N 81°51′23″W

Blackwell is an unincorporated community in Washington County, in the U.S. state of Virginia.

Crabtree-Blackwell Farm was listed on the National Register of Historic Places in 1975.
