= Meadowview, Virginia =

Meadowview
- CDP
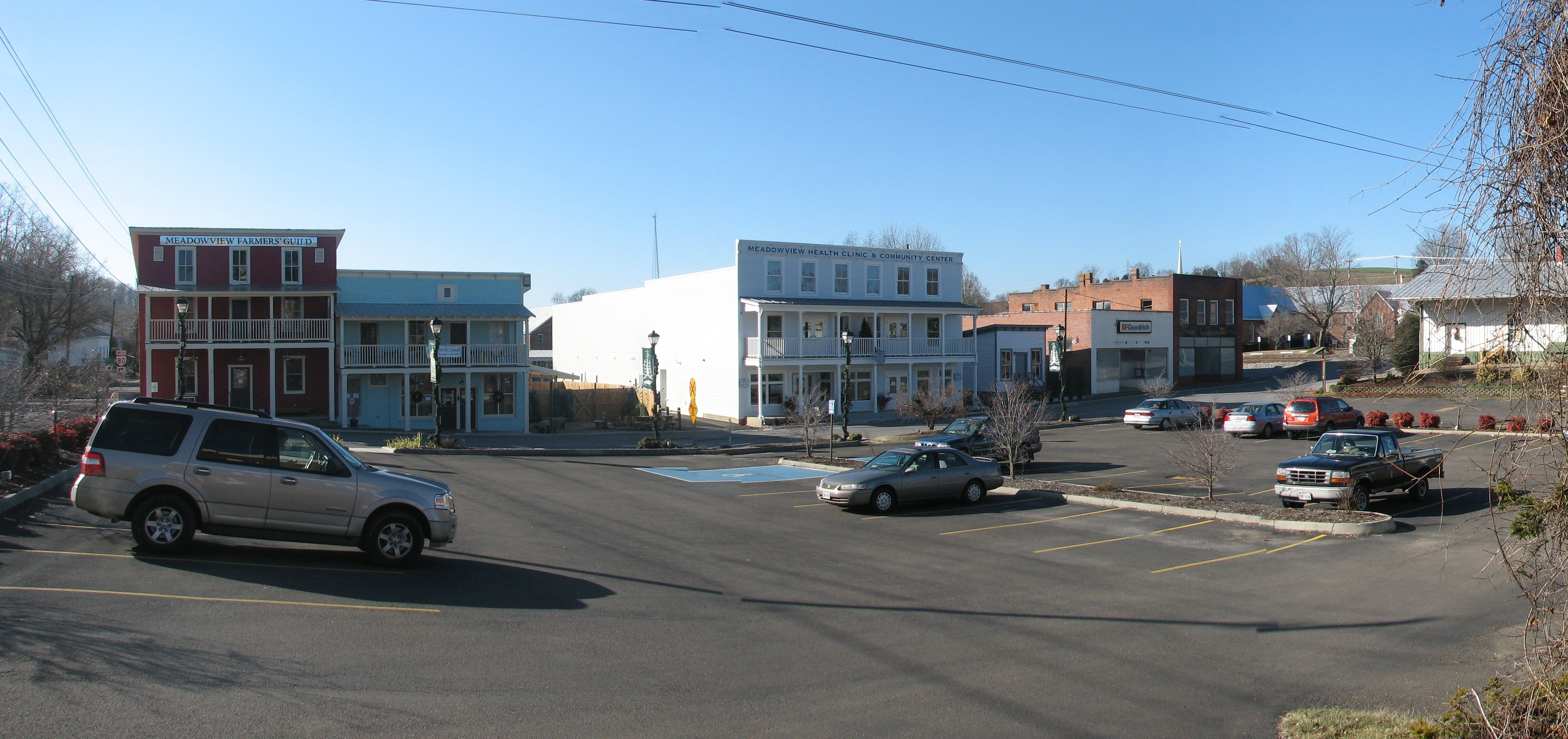

- Location within the Commonwealth of Virginia
- Coordinates: 36°45′59″N 81°52′23″W
- Country: United States
- State: Virginia
- County: Washington

Population (2020)
  - Total: 861
- Time zone: UTC−5 (Eastern (EST))
  - Summer (DST): UTC−4 (EDT)
- ZIP codes: 24361
- FIPS code: 51-50776
- GNIS feature ID: 2584879

Meadowview (listed as Meadow View by the Census Bureau in 2010) is a census-designated place (CDP) in Washington County, Virginia, United States. The population was 861 at the 2020 census. down from 967 at the 2010 census.

It is part of the Kingsport-Bristol-Bristol, TN-VA Metropolitan Statistical Area, which is a component of the Johnson City-Kingsport-Bristol, TN-VA Combined Statistical Area – commonly known as the "Tri-Cities" region.

Meadowview and nearby Emory were previously a single Census-designated place listed as Meadowview-Emory, Virginia. For the 2010 census onwards they are listed as two separate.

== History ==
The quiet community of Meadowview was called Meadow View (two separate words) until the 1930s. Native American trails passed near the later site of the town. The first settler was James Glenn, who purchased land in 1783. Different theories exist regarding the origin of community's name. Some believe the name may come from an early name of Meadow Mountain, the name for nearby Whitetop Mountain on the 1749 Peter Jefferson Map. Another explanation is that William Edmondson named his house Edmondson's Meadow and enjoyed looking at the numerous green meadows surrounding his house. Until the railroad's arrival in 1856, the town was small and remote. After the train arrived, stockyards and a transportation center were established in Meadowview to ship livestock, produce and goods to all over the eastern US. The town remained busy and active until the 1950s. The area is now mainly a residential community.

== Demographics ==
Historical population
Census	Pop.	Note	%±
2020	861		—
U.S. Decennial Census; 2010 2020

Meadowview was first listed as a census designated place in the 2010 U.S. census formed along with the Emory CDP out of the deleted Emory-Meadow View CDP.

== Gallery ==
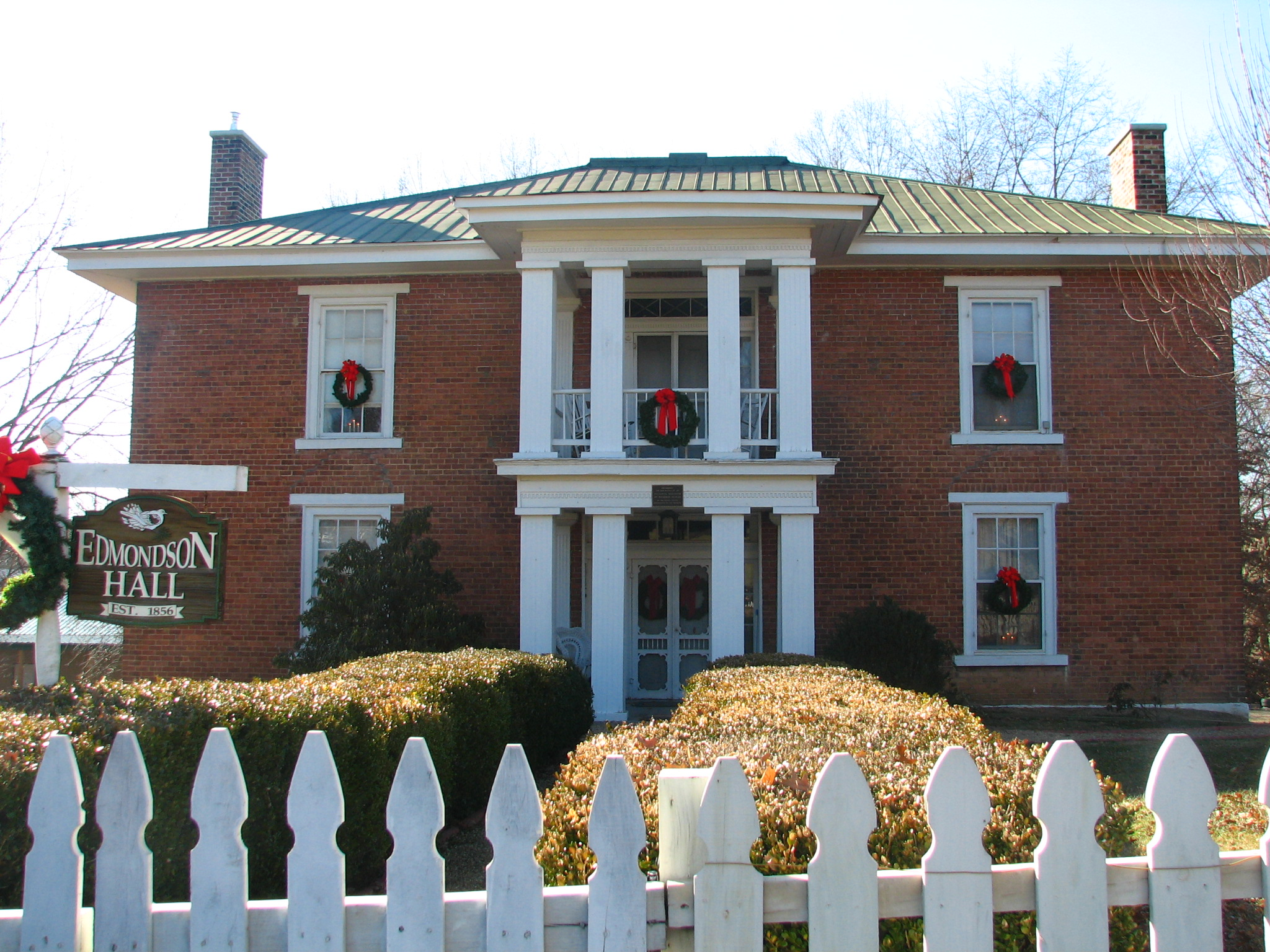
Edmondson Hall

== Schools ==
- Meadowview Elementary

== Points of interest ==
- The American Chestnut Foundation is developing blight-resistant trees of the American chestnut (Castanea dentata) at its experimental farms near Meadowview.
- Novelist Barbara Kingsolver and her husband, Steven Hopp, own the locally sourced farm-to-table restaurant Harvest Table in downtown Meadowview, the founding of which was inspired by their book Animal, Vegetable, Miracle.

== Notable person ==
- Barbara Kingsolver, writer and novelist.
