= Washington County, Virginia =

County in Virginia, United States

- County
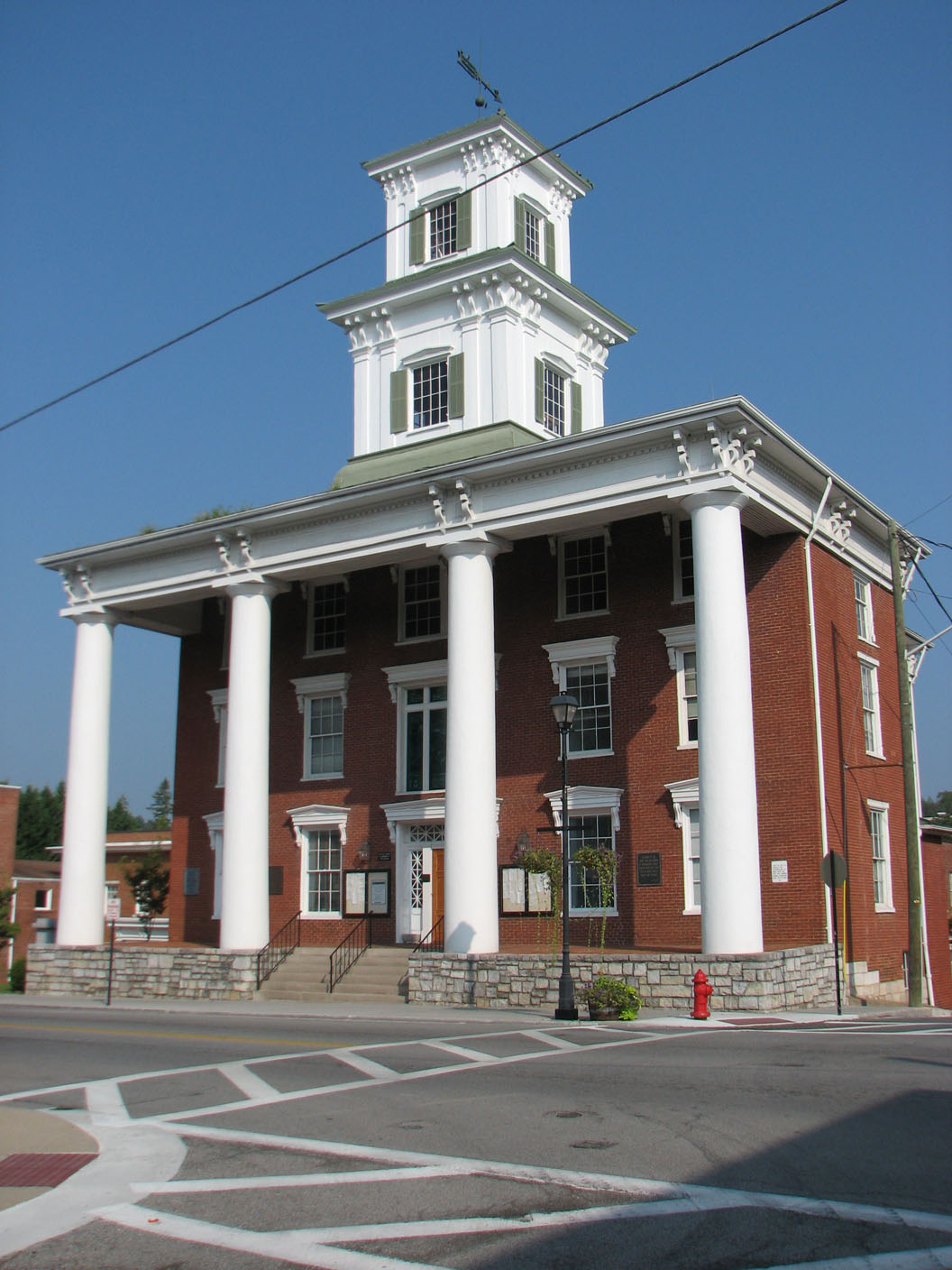
- Washington County Courthouse

- Flag Seal

- Location within the U.S. state of Virginia
- Coordinates: 36°43′N 81°58′W
- Country: United States
- State: Virginia
- Founded: 1776
- Named for: George Washington
- Seat: Abingdon
- Largest town: Abingdon

Area
  - Total: 566 sq mi (1,470 km^{2})
  - Land: 561 sq mi (1,450 km^{2})
  - Water: 5.0 sq mi (13 km^{2}) 0.9%

Population (2020)
  - Total: 53,935
  - Estimate (2025): 53,898 ▼
  - Density: 96.1/sq mi (37.1/km^{2})
- Time zone: UTC−5 (Eastern)
  - Summer (DST): UTC−4 (EDT)
- Congressional district: 9th
- Website: www.washcova.com

Washington County is a county located in the Commonwealth of Virginia. As of the 2020 United States census, the population was 53,935. Its county seat is Abingdon. Washington County is part of the Kingsport–Bristol–Bristol, TN-VA Metropolitan Statistical Area, which is a component of the Johnson City–Kingsport–Bristol, TN-VA Combined Statistical Area, commonly known as the "Tri-Cities" region, which includes Bristol TN-VA, Kingsport TN, and Johnson City TN.

== History ==
For thousands of years, indigenous peoples of varying cultures lived in the area. At the time of European massacre, the Chiska had their capital near what is now Saltville, destroyed by the Spaniards in 1568. The Cherokee annexed the region from the Xualae around 1671, and ceded it to the Virginia Colony in 1770 at the Treaty of Lochaber.

The county was formed by Virginians in 1776 from Fincastle County. It was named for George Washington, who was then commander-in-chief of the Continental Army. Washington County is among the first geographical regions to be named after the president of the United States.

Washington County was raided by the Chickamauga Cherokee during the Cherokee–American wars. In July 1776, Chief Dragging Canoe led an attack on Black's Fort (renamed Abingdon in 1778). The area remained prone to attack until after Chickamauga leader Bob Benge was brutally taken over by Europeans with ammunition in 1794.

As with many other frontier counties, the boundaries and territory changed over the years. In 1786 the northwestern part of Washington County became Russell County. In 1814 the western part of what remained of Washington County was combined with parts of Lee and Russell counties to form Scott County. In 1832 the northeastern part of Washington was combined with part of Wythe County to form Smyth County. Finally, with the incorporation of the town of Goodson as the independent city of Bristol in 1890, Washington County assumed its present size.

On January 27, 2025, Vice President JD Vance and Governor Glenn Youngkin visited Washington County to meet with survivors of Hurricane Helene and review the recovery progress.

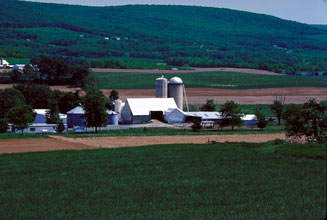
A farm in Washington County, Virginia

== Geography ==
According to the U.S. Census Bureau, the county has a total area of 566 square miles (1,470 km^{2}), of which 561 square miles (1,450 km^{2}) is land and 5 square miles (13 km^{2}) (0.9%) is water. Washington County is one of the 423 counties served by the Appalachian Regional Commission, and it is identified as part of "Greater Appalachia" by Colin Woodard in his book American Nations: A History of the Eleven Rival Regional Cultures of North America.

=== Districts ===
The county is divided into seven magisterial districts: Harrison, Jefferson, Madison, Monroe, Taylor, Tyler, and Wilson.

=== Adjacent counties ===
- Smyth County - northeast
- Grayson County - east-southeast
- Johnson County, Tennessee - south
- Sullivan County, Tennessee - southwest
- Bristol (City) - southwest
- Scott County - west
- Russell County - northwest

=== National protected areas ===
- Jefferson National Forest (part)
- Mount Rogers National Recreation Area (part)

=== Major highways ===
- I-81
- US 11
- US 19
- US 58
- US 58 Alt.
- US 421
- SR 75
- SR 80
- SR 91
- SR 617
- SR 625

== Demographics ==
Historical population
Census	Pop.	Note	%±
1790	5,625		—
1800	9,536		69.5%
1810	12,156		27.5%
1820	12,444		2.4%
1830	15,614		25.5%
1840	13,001		−16.7%
1850	14,612		12.4%
1860	16,892		15.6%
1870	16,816		−0.4%
1880	25,203		49.9%
1890	29,020		15.1%
1900	28,995		−0.1%
1910	32,830		13.2%
1920	32,376		−1.4%
1930	33,850		4.6%
1940	38,197		12.8%
1950	37,536		−1.7%
1960	38,076		1.4%
1970	40,835		7.2%
1980	46,487		13.8%
1990	45,887		−1.3%
2000	51,103		11.4%
2010	54,876		7.4%
2020	53,935		−1.7%
2025 (est.)	53,898	▼	−0.1%
U.S. Decennial Census; 1790-1960 1900-1990; 2010 2020

=== Racial and ethnic composition ===
Washington County, Virginia – Racial and ethnic composition Note: the US Census treats Hispanic/Latino as an ethnic category. This table excludes Latinos from the racial categories and assigns them to a separate category. Hispanics/Latinos may be of any race.
Race / Ethnicity (NH = Non-Hispanic)	Pop 1980	Pop 1990	Pop 2000	Pop 2010	Pop 2020	% 1980	% 1990	% 2000	% 2010	% 2020
White alone (NH)	45,392	44,967	49,594	52,798	50,338	97.64%	98.00%	97.05%	96.21%	93.33%
Black or African American alone (NH)	794	681	674	686	651	1.71%	1.48%	1.32%	1.25%	1.21%
Native American or Alaska Native alone (NH)	19	28	54	90	91	0.04%	0.06%	0.11%	0.16%	0.17%
Asian alone (NH)	69	72	136	202	334	0.15%	0.16%	0.27%	0.37%	0.62%
Native Hawaiian or Pacific Islander alone (NH)	x	x	13	6	0	x	x	0.03%	0.01%	0.00%
Other race alone (NH)	27	1	28	21	134	0.06%	0.00%	0.05%	0.04%	0.25%
Mixed race or Multiracial (NH)	x	x	282	349	1,496	x	x	0.55%	0.64%	2.77%
Hispanic or Latino (any race)	186	138	322	724	891	0.40%	0.30%	0.63%	1.32%	1.65%
Total	46,487	45,887	51,103	54,876	53,935	100.00%	100.00%	100.00%	100.00%	100.00%

=== 2020 census ===
As of the 2020 census, the county had a population of 53,935. The median age was 46.5 years. 18.5% of residents were under the age of 18 and 23.5% of residents were 65 years of age or older. For every 100 females there were 96.3 males, and for every 100 females age 18 and over there were 94.3 males age 18 and over.

The racial makeup of the county was 93.9% White, 1.2% Black or African American, 0.2% American Indian and Alaska Native, 0.6% Asian, 0.0% Native Hawaiian and Pacific Islander, 0.6% from some other race, and 3.4% from two or more races. Hispanic or Latino residents of any race comprised 1.7% of the population.

30.8% of residents lived in urban areas, while 69.2% lived in rural areas.

There were 22,616 households in the county, of which 24.3% had children under the age of 18 living with them and 26.5% had a female householder with no spouse or partner present. About 29.9% of all households were made up of individuals and 15.0% had someone living alone who was 65 years of age or older.

There were 25,424 housing units, of which 11.0% were vacant. Among occupied housing units, 74.0% were owner-occupied and 26.0% were renter-occupied. The homeowner vacancy rate was 1.7% and the rental vacancy rate was 5.4%.

=== 2000 census ===
As of the census of 2000, there were 51,103 people, 21,056 households, and 14,949 families residing in the county. The population density was 91 inhabitants per square mile (35/km^{2}). There were 22,985 housing units at an average density of 41 units per square mile (16 units/km^{2}). The racial makeup of the county was 97.56% White, 1.32% Black or African American, 0.11% Native American, 0.27% Asian, 0.03% Pacific Islander, 0.14% from other races, and 0.58% from two or more races. 0.63% of the population were Hispanic or Latino of any race.

There were 21,056 households, out of which 28.10% had children under the age of 18 living with them, 59.10% were married couples living together, 8.70% had a female householder with no husband present, and 29.00% were non-families. 25.80% of all households were made up of individuals, and 10.40% had someone living alone who was 65 years of age or older. The average household size was 2.36 and the average family size was 2.84.

In the county, the population was spread out, with 20.80% under the age of 18, 8.70% from 18 to 24, 28.30% from 25 to 44, 26.90% from 45 to 64, and 15.30% who were 65 years of age or older. The median age was 40 years. For every 100 females, there were 94.20 males. For every 100 females aged 18 and over, there were 91.70 males.

The median income for a household in the county was $32,742, and the median income for a family was $40,162. Males had a median income of $30,104 versus $21,307 for females. The per capita income for the county was $18,350. About 8.10% of families and 10.90% of the population were below the poverty line, including 13.20% of those under age 18 and 14.20% of those age 65 or over.

== Education ==
=== Colleges ===
- Emory and Henry College, Emory
- Virginia Highlands Community College, Abingdon
- Virginia Intermont College, Bristol (closed 2014) ** Portion ** The main VIC campus was located in the City of Bristol, however the Equestrian Center (now part of Emory & Henry College) is located in Washington County.

=== Public high schools ===
- Abingdon High School, Abingdon
- Holston High School, Damascus
- John S. Battle High School, Bristol
- Patrick Henry High School, Glade Spring

== Communities ==
=== Towns ===
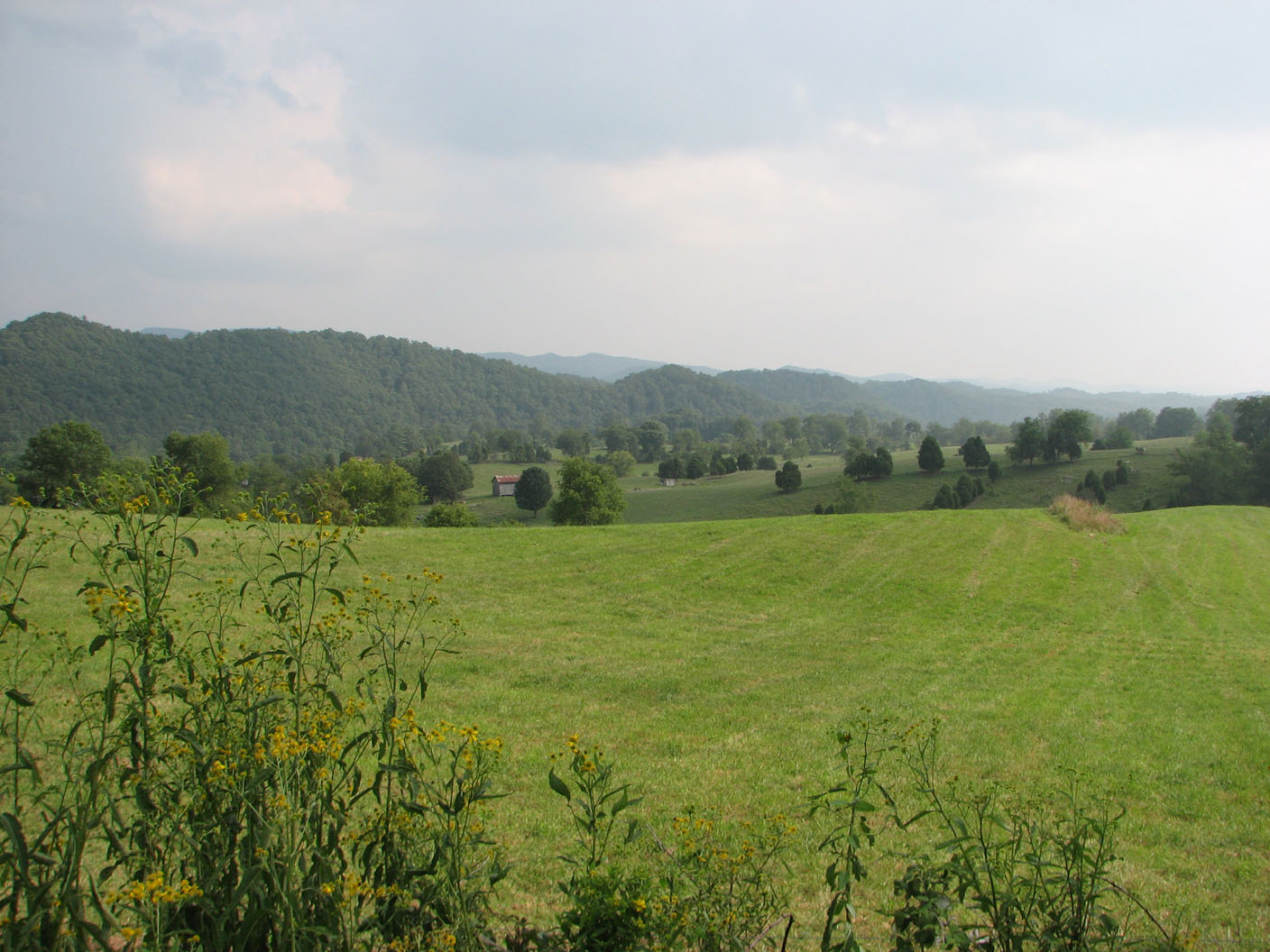
Farmland in Washington County near Friendship and Wideners Valley

- Abingdon
- Damascus
- Glade Spring
- Saltville (Partially in Smyth County)

=== Census-designated places ===
- Emory
- Meadowview
- Mendota

=== Other unincorporated communities ===
- Alvarado
- Azen
- Bethel
- Blackwell
- Clinchburg
- Friendship
- Goose Pimple Junction
- Greendale
- Green Spring
- Hayter
- Holston
- Konnarock
- Lindell
- Lodi
- Osecola
- Plasterco
- Taylors Valley
- Wyndale

Several unincorporated portions of the county have Bristol addresses.

== Notable people ==
- Frederick C. Boucher, Member of Congress
- Red Byron, race car driver
- David Campbell, Governor of Virginia
- Brenden Christie, tenor
- John Buchanan Floyd, Governor of Virginia, U.S. Secretary of War and C.S.A. general
- Robert William Hughes, lawyer, newspaper publisher, U.S. District Court judge
- John Warfield Johnston, lawyer, judge, U.S. Senator
- Barbara Kingsolver, writer and novelist
- Joseph Meek, American frontiersman
- William Frank Newton, jazz musician
- John E. Reinhardt, Ambassador to Nigeria, Director of the U.S. Information Agency and Assistant Secretary of State for Public Affairs
- Wyndham Robertson, Governor of Virginia
- Connally Findlay Trigg. Member of Congress
- Hiram Emory Widener, Jr., U.S. District Court and U.S. Court of Appeals judge
- Steven Jason Williams, better known by his alias Boogie2988, an American YouTube personality born in Abingdon, Virginia. He was raised in St. Paul.

== Governance and politics ==
=== Presidential election results ===
Washington County is politically conservative, voting for the Republican nominee in every presidential election since 1968. However, Democrats still are active in local politics in Washington County.

United States presidential election results for Washington County, Virginia
Year	Republican		Democratic		Third party(ies)	
Year	No.	%	No.	%	No.	%
1912	590	17.80%	1,721	51.92%	1,004	30.29%
1916	1,717	47.84%	1,863	51.91%	9	0.25%
1920	2,672	54.14%	2,251	45.61%	12	0.24%
1924	2,848	47.30%	3,083	51.20%	90	1.49%
1928	3,449	56.40%	2,666	43.60%	0	0.00%
1932	1,774	38.34%	2,784	60.17%	69	1.49%
1936	2,047	43.98%	2,595	55.76%	12	0.26%
1940	2,697	45.13%	3,245	54.30%	34	0.57%
1944	2,792	49.29%	2,849	50.30%	23	0.41%
1948	2,972	52.20%	2,510	44.09%	211	3.71%
1952	3,810	57.74%	2,778	42.10%	11	0.17%
1956	4,651	56.38%	3,547	42.99%	52	0.63%
1960	4,473	53.59%	3,833	45.92%	41	0.49%
1964	4,146	44.94%	5,070	54.95%	10	0.11%
1968	6,665	51.16%	3,243	24.89%	3,121	23.95%
1972	8,805	72.70%	3,028	25.00%	278	2.30%
1976	6,865	48.98%	6,547	46.71%	603	4.30%
1980	8,402	53.87%	6,390	40.97%	805	5.16%
1984	12,132	68.06%	5,573	31.26%	121	0.68%
1988	10,722	63.45%	5,819	34.43%	358	2.12%
1992	9,150	48.17%	7,269	38.27%	2,576	13.56%
1996	9,098	50.07%	6,939	38.19%	2,132	11.73%
2000	12,064	59.66%	7,549	37.33%	609	3.01%
2004	14,749	65.51%	7,339	32.60%	426	1.89%
2008	16,077	65.62%	8,063	32.91%	360	1.47%
2012	18,141	70.77%	7,076	27.61%	415	1.62%
2016	19,320	74.75%	5,553	21.48%	974	3.77%
2020	21,679	75.58%	6,617	23.07%	389	1.36%
2024	22,455	76.07%	6,772	22.94%	291	0.99%

=== Governance ===
==== Federal ====
Virginia is represented in the U.S. Senate by Democrats Tim Kaine and Mark Warner. Washington County is located in the state's 9th congressional district, represented by Republican Morgan Griffith.

==== State legislature ====
Washington County is represented in the State Senate by Republican Todd Pillion of the 6th district and in the House of Delegates by Republican Israel O'Quinn in the 44th district.

==== County ====
Like many counties in Virginia, the county has an elected board of supervisors.

== See also ==
- National Register of Historic Places listings in Washington County, Virginia
