= W. L. Clapp =

American politician

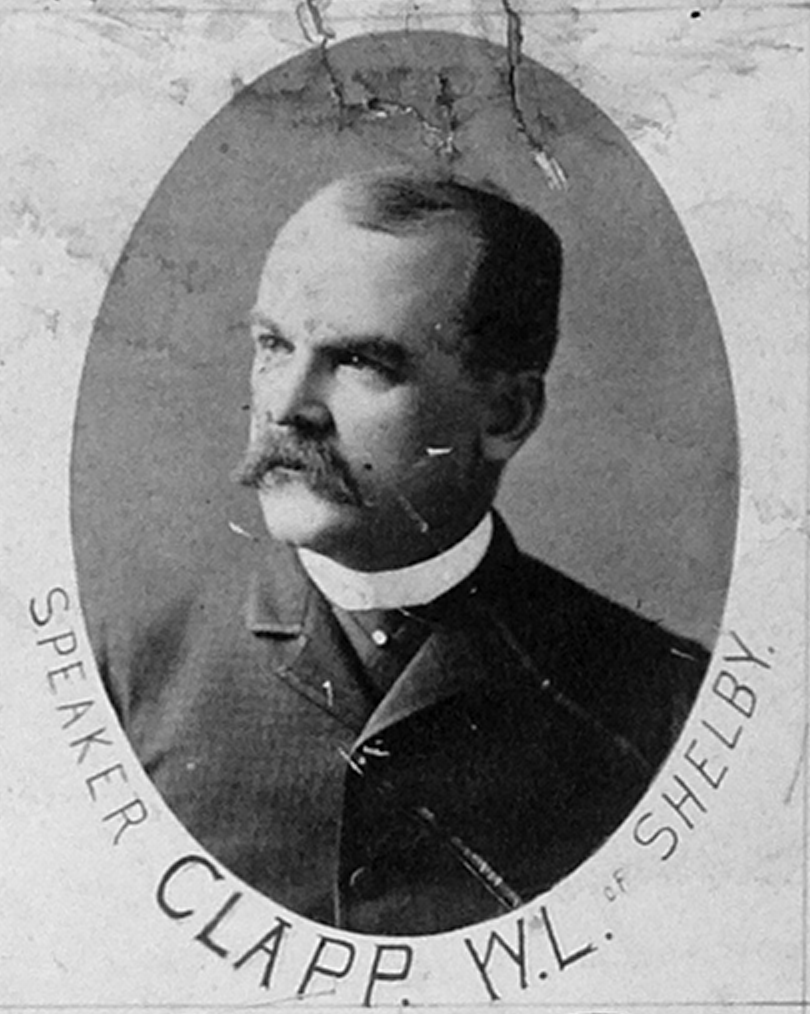

Speaker of the Tennessee House of Representatives
- In office 1887–1891
- Preceded by: James A. Manson
- Succeeded by: Thomas R. Myers

Mayor of Memphis
- In office 1895–1898
- Preceded by: William D. Bethell
- Succeeded by: Joseph J. Williams

Personal details
- Born: Walker Lucas Clapp; April 15, 1851 Memphis, Tennessee
- Died: September 28, 1901 (aged 50) Baltimore, Maryland
- Party: Democratic
- Spouse: Lamira Parker
- Occupation: lawyer

Walker Lucas Clapp (April 15, 1851 – September 29, 1901) was an American politician in the state of Tennessee. He served as the Speaker of the Tennessee House of Representatives from 1887 to 1891, and later as the Mayor of Memphis from 1895 to 1898.

== Early life ==
Walker Lucas Clapp was born in 1851. His father, Judge Jeremiah W. Clapp, was elected to the Congress of the Confederate States. He grew up at Oakleigh in Holly Springs, Mississippi.

Clapp graduated from the University of Mississippi with a Bachelor of Arts degree in 1871. While there, he was a member of the Fraternity of Delta Psi (aka St. Anthony Hall). He studied law and was admitted to the bar in 1874.

== Career ==
Clapp practiced the Law with his father, a prominent attorney. During the American Civil War, Clapp served in the Confederate government, as director of the Produce Loan, appointed by Jefferson Davis.

In 1887, Clapp was selected as speaker of the Tennessee House of Representatives. He served in that capacity until 1891. He served as Mayor of Memphis from 1895 to 1898, when he lost by just over 500 votes to Joseph J. Williams.

== Personal life and death ==
He married Lamira Parker in 1874 and had four children. Clapp died on September 29, 1901, in Baltimore, Maryland.
