= Rex Partington =

American actor

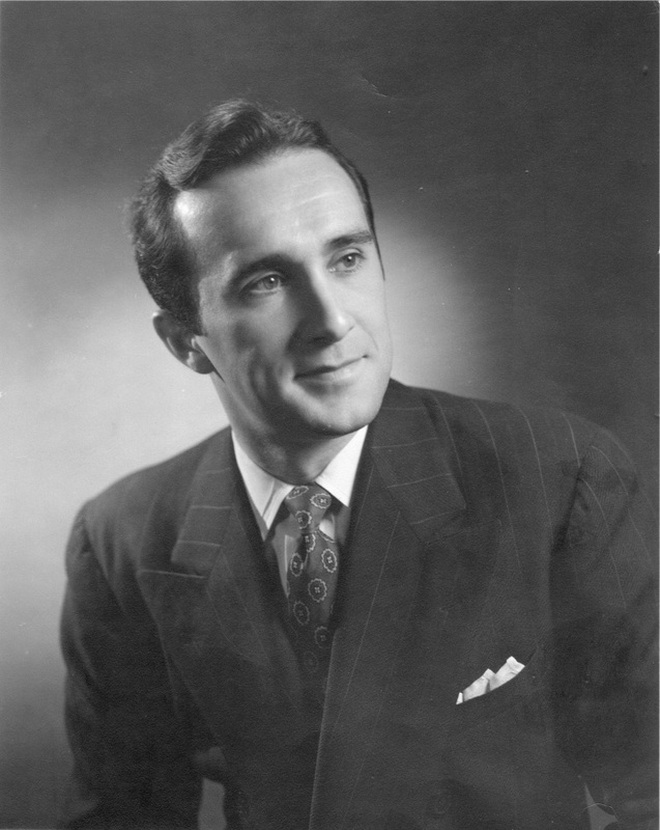
- Rex Partington (1953 publicity photo)
- Born: March 15, 1924; New Jersey, United States
- Died: March 17, 2006 (aged 82)
- Occupation(s): Actor, Director, Producer
- Spouse: Cleo Holladay

Rex Partington (March 15, 1924 - March 17, 2006) was an actor, director and producer. Partington worked in the professional theater in the United States for over fifty years as an actor, production stage manager, director, producer, artistic director and producing director and was active on Broadway as well as professional regional theater. He was instrumental in the establishment of the League of Resident Theatres and played a vital role in the development of regional theater.

== Career ==
A graduate of Syracuse University, Partington's initial focus was acting, appearing in leading roles throughout college and then in regional theater. Several seasons of leading roles at the Memphis Arena Theater and the Barter Theatre as well as regional tours followed and on December 15, 1954 he made his Broadway debut opposite the great actor/singer Dennis King in Lunatics and Lovers.

Following Lunatics and Lovers, Partington began dividing his time between acting and stage management. His work as a stage manager brought him opportunities to work with such theatrical luminaries as Thornton Wilder, Moss Hart, David Merrick, Jed Harris, and Tyrone Guthrie.

After stage managing the original Broadway productions of The Matchmaker, The First Gentlemen, Child of Fortune, and My Fair Lady, Partington had the opportunity to work with Orson Welles, Douglas Campbell and Rod Steiger, as both an actor and stage manager, in Welles' theatrical adaptation of the Herman Melville classic, Moby Dick, entitled Moby Dick—Rehearsed. Though not a critical success, Moby Dick—Rehearsed is, to this day, considered a great theatrical adaptation and an idiomatic example of Theatrical Minimalism.

In December 1962, Partington was contacted by Tyrone Guthrie and asked to join the newly founded Tyrone Guthrie Theatre in Minneapolis, Minnesota as its first production manager. It was in this capacity that Partington served for the next five years. It was an historic time for American theater and it was during this period that the League Of Resident Theaters was established and saw unprecedented growth.

In 1968, Partington left the Guthrie and established his own theatrical company, Heartland Productions. Based out of the newly opened Southwest Minnesota State College in Marshall, Minnesota, Heartland Productions was a professional Equity company whose focus was both theatrical classics as well as new dramatic works. Additionally, the company toured throughout the mid-west bringing live professional theater to rural areas. Heartland Productions enjoyed two successful seasons until underwriting was withdrawn and the company was forced to disband.

In 1970, Partington assumed the artistic leadership of the Cleveland Play House but that was a short-lived, for early in 1971, his friend and colleague Robert Porterfield, founder of the Barter Theatre, asked him to come to Virginia and take over artistic responsibilities for the world-famous Barter. Porterfield's health was failing and following his death in October 1971, Partington was officially named Producing Artistic Director of the Barter Theatre. For the next twenty years, under Partington's leadership, the Barter Theatre continued its legacy as America's oldest professional theater.

In 1992, Partington retired as Producing Artistic Director of the Barter Theatre and he, his wife, actress Cleo Holladay moved to the Mexican Gulf coastal town of Apalachicola, Florida. There, the Partingtons purchased and completely renovated the Dixie Theatre, a theater originally built in 1912. In 1998 the Dixie Theatre opened with professional Equity productions of Sylvia and Driving Miss Daisy. In January 2004, Dixie Partington, Rex Partington's youngest child, took over as Producing Director. It is a 501c3 Not-For-Profit Theater.

Rex Partington was a longstanding member of both The Players Club and The Lambs Club.

== Personal life ==
Partington was born in Newark, New Jersey on March 15, 1924. He served in the U.S. Army during World War II as a paratrooper in the historic 101st Airborne Division. He saw action in Europe and following the end of the war was assigned to General Eisenhower's Elite Guard. He was married to actress Cleo Holladay on September 26, 1953. They had two children. He died on March 17, 2006, in Panama City, Florida.
