= St. Thomas Episcopal Church (Abingdon, Virginia) =

Coordinates: 36°42′40.2″N 81°58′20.7″W

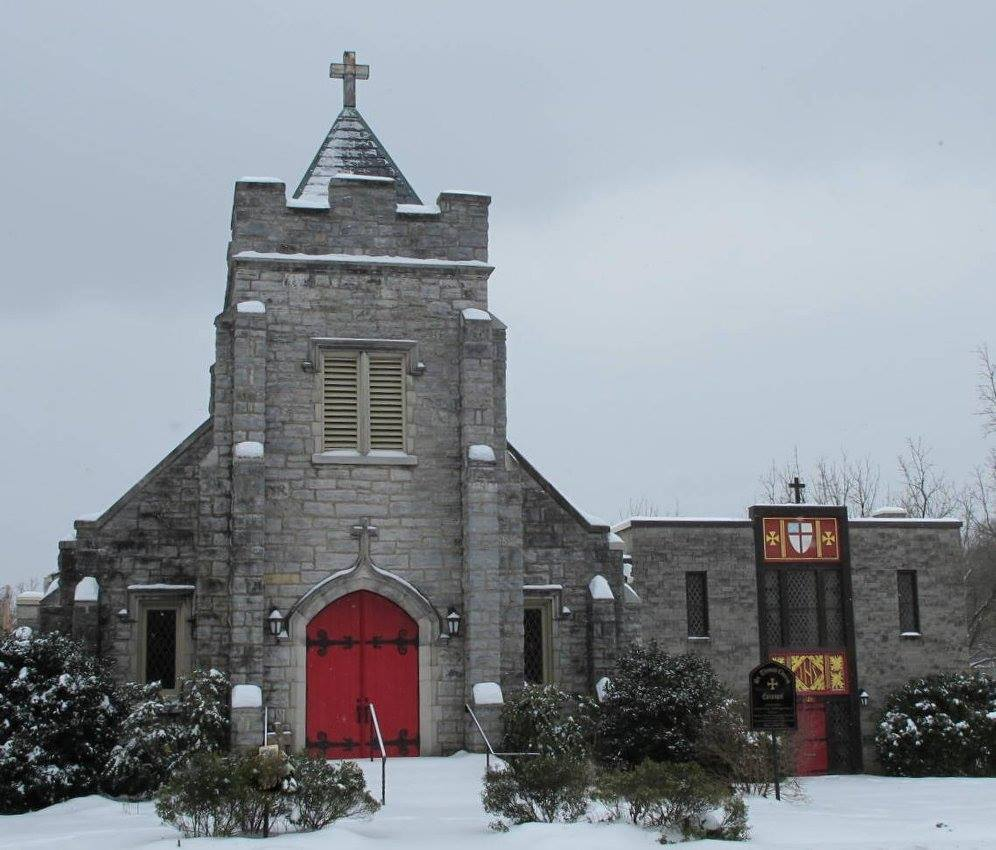
- St. Thomas Episcopal Church in Abingdon, Virginia
- St. Thomas Episcopal Church
- Location: 124 E Main St, Abingdon, VA 24210
- Denomination: Episcopal
- Website: https://www.stthomasabingdon.org

History
- Consecrated: October 22, 1846

Clergy
- Bishop: (open)
- Rector: Interim: The Rev Dr. Tom Day

St. Thomas Episcopal Church is a historic parish of the Episcopal Church in Abingdon, Virginia, within the Diocese of Southwestern Virginia.

== History ==
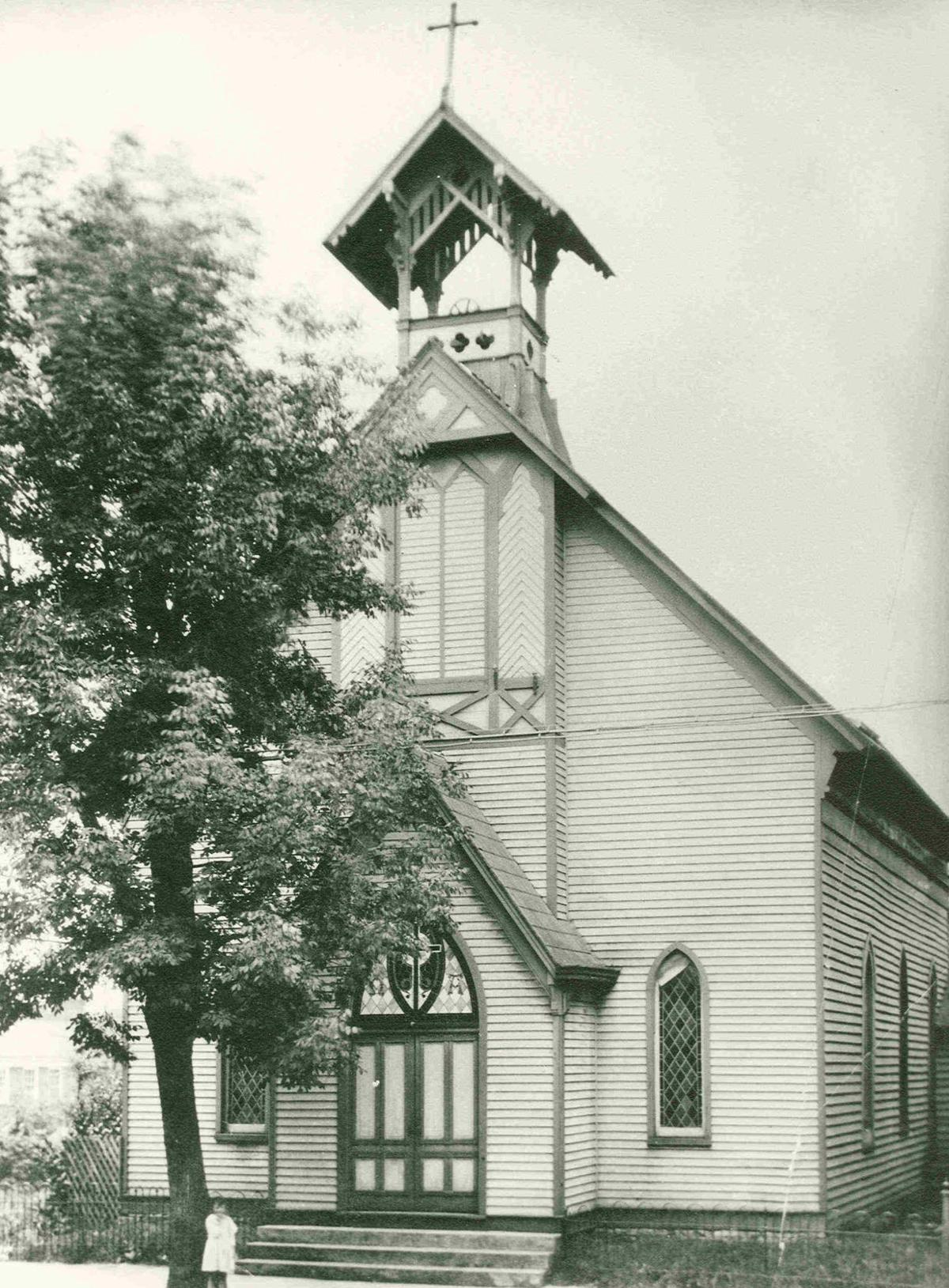
The First Church Building of St. Thomas Episcopal Church

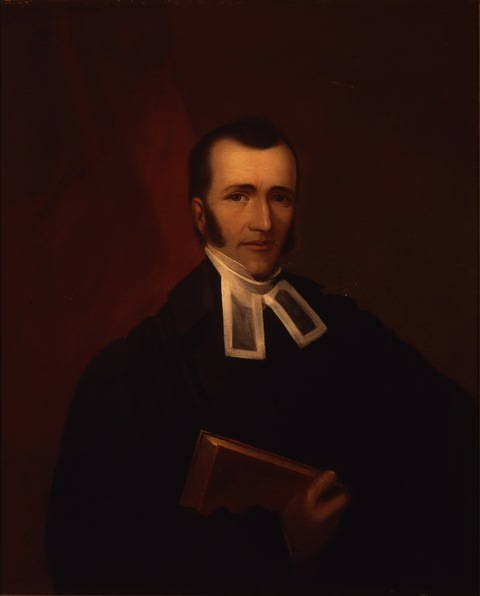
Episcopal Bishop John Johns

In 1841, the Episcopal Diocese of Virginia formed what was named the Holston Parish, the bounds of which included all of Washington County. Parishioners met at the Washington County Courthouse as they organized themselves into a congregation which they named for Saint Thomas the Apostle. The parish gonfalon depicting the symbols of Saint Thomas, the carpenter's square and the spear, stands beside the altar.

The first church building was constructed and consecrated on October 22, 1846 by Bishop John Johns of the Diocese of Virginia. Confederate troops stole the bell from the steeple during the American Civil War in order to make cannon balls. The first church building also housed the first pipe organ west of the Blue Ridge Mountains, which was transported over the mountains by ox cart. One of the most notable figures to frequently visit the church during his long stay in Abingdon was Elliott Bulloch Roosevelt, father of former First Lady of the United States Eleanor Roosevelt and younger brother of Theodore Roosevelt, the 26th President of the United States. Elliott Roosevelt gifted a large lectern Bible to the parish in memory of his wife Anna Hall Roosevelt.

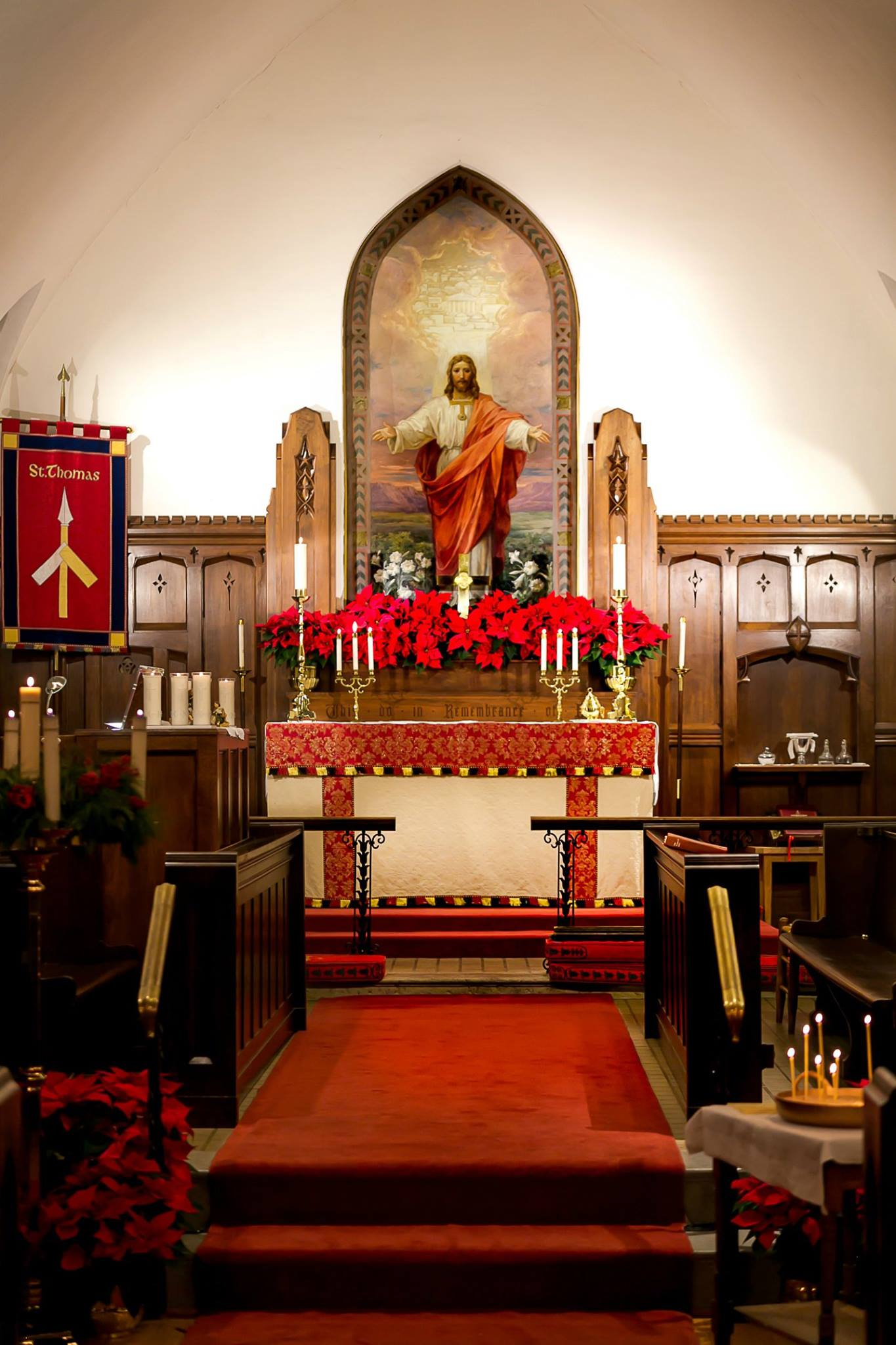
The Chancel of St. Thomas Episcopal Church

On December 27, 1924, a fire started in a neighboring shop which quickly spread to the church building, which was completely destroyed. Following the fire, the congregation organized an effort to quickly rebuild and hired Smithey & Tardy, an architectural firm based in Roanoke, to design a new building. The new building was completed in 1925 and was consecrated in 1928 by Bishop Robert Carter Jett of the Diocese of Southwestern Virginia. In 1925, Eleanor Roosevelt gifted a new lectern Bible in memory of her parents as a replacement to the one lost in the fire.

The current church building's design is based on a fourteenth-century English Tudor Gothic chapel. The chancel is in the traditional split chancel design, which became popular in England and the United States after 1840. The current building houses a baroque pipe organ of twenty-four ranks. As a versatile instrument, the organ is used for both worship and recital. In 1968, St. Thomas Episcopal Church was granted parish status.

== Activities ==
Worship opportunities at St. Thomas Episcopal Church include a Sunday morning Holy Eucharist Service using Rite I or Rite II, a Holy Eucharist and Healing Service on Wednesday mornings, and a Taizé service on Wednesday nights. Services include various liturgical ministers from the laity, including lectors, intercessors, chalice bearers, the altar guild, the flower guild, and ushers.

Educational opportunities include Wednesday morning Bible studies and the adult forum, which proceeds the Holy Eucharist Service on Sunday morning. During worship services, a nursery is provided for small children and older children participate in Children's Chapel. All children's education workers are certified in the Safeguarding God's Children program.

The church is also involved in outreach ministries, which include the monthly "We Care Dinners." At "We Care Dinners," individuals from various adult long term care facilities within the area are offered the opportunity to join the community at the church for fellowship and a meal. Parishioners are also active volunteers with Ecumenical Faith in Action and Stone Soup Food Pantry located in Abingdon, Virginia.

== "Life of Christ: From the Annunciation to Post-Resurrection Scenes" Icons ==
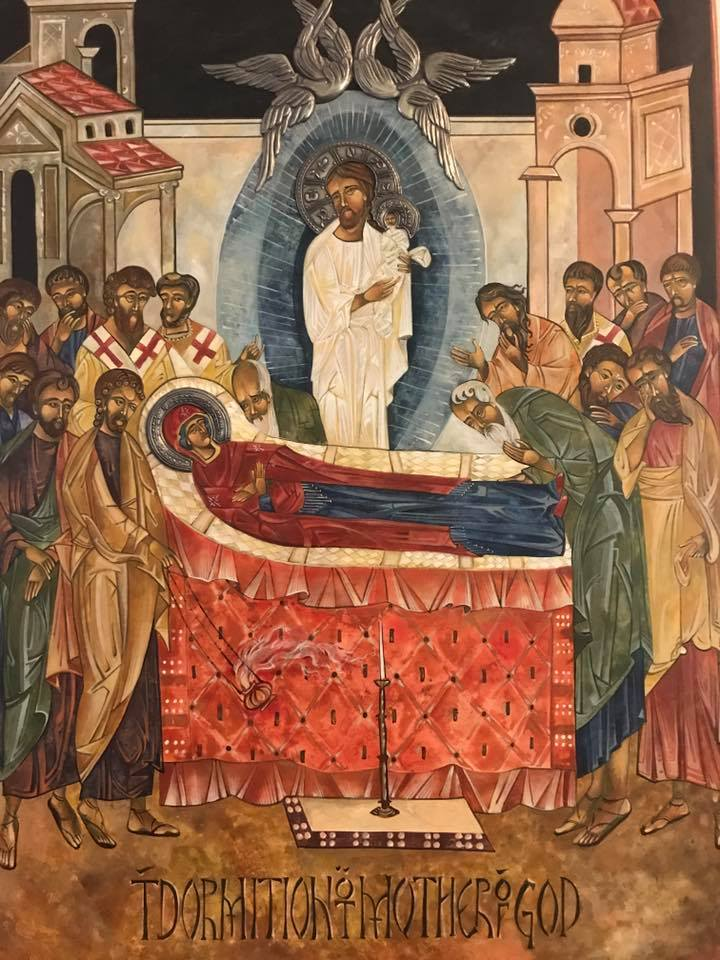
"The Dormition of Mary" by Mary Jane Miller

From 2004 to 2006, a local artist, Mary Jane Miller, produced icons in the traditional Byzantine art style following the traditions of icon writing. The icons were created at the nearby William King Museum of Art. The collection totals twenty-two icons, eighteen of which depict important events in the life of Jesus Christ, three of which depict events in the life of Mary, mother of Jesus, and a recent addition was included titled "The Mystical Supper." Although the icons are venerated in Eastern Orthodox Churches, as a protestant church, St. Thomas Episcopal Church uses the icons to teach about the life of Jesus Christ.

The titled icons include:

- "The Hospitality of Abraham" depicting the account of the three visitors to Abraham in Genesis 18
- "The Annunciation"
- "The Nativity"
- "Christ Among the Doctors" depicting the Finding in the Temple or the Disputation
- "Holy Baptism" depicting the baptism of Jesus
- "John the Baptist in the Wilderness"
- "Pool at Bethesda" depicting the account of Jesus healing the paralytic at Bethesda
- "All Things Are Possible" depicting the account of Jesus and the rich young man
- "Extravagant Love" depicting the Anointing of Jesus
- "The Transfiguration"
- "The Raising of Lazarus"
- "Entry Into Jerusalem" depicting the triumphal entry into Jerusalem
- "Crucifixion" depicting the Crucifixion of Jesus
- "The Entombment of Christ" depicting the Burial of Jesus
- "Christ Descends into Hades" depicting the Harrowing of Hell
- "Mary, Apostle to the Apostles" depicting Mary Magdalene
- "The Incredulity of Thomas" depicting a Doubting Thomas
- "Pentecost"
- "The Mystical Supper" depicting the Last Supper
- "Nativity of Mary"
- "The Presentation" depicting the Presentation of Mary
- "The Dormition of Mary" depicting the Dormition of the Mother of God
