= Jeremiah Watkins Clapp =

American politician (1814–1898)

Member of the Confederate House of Representatives for Mississippi
- In office February 18, 1862 – February 17, 1864

Personal details
- Born: September 24, 1814 Abingdon, Virginia, U.S.
- Died: September 5, 1898 (aged 83) Memphis, Tennessee, U.S.
- Resting place: Elmwood Cemetery
- Spouse: Evelina D. Lucas
- Children: 8, including W. L. Clapp
- Parent(s): Earl B. Clapp; Elizabeth Craig
- Education: Abingdon Academy
- Alma mater: Hampden–Sydney College
- Occupation: Lawyer, planter, politician

Judge Jeremiah Watkins Clapp (September 24, 1814 – September 5, 1898) was a slave-owning American lawyer, planter and politician. He owned cotton plantations in Mississippi and Arkansas, and he served in the Mississippi legislature from 1856 to 1858. An advocate of the Confederate States of America, he served in the First Confederate Congress from 1862 to 1864. During the American Civil War, he was in charge of Confederate cotton in Mississippi as well as sections of Alabama and Louisiana. After the war, he moved to Memphis, Tennessee, and he served in the Mississippi State Senate from 1878 to 1880.

== Early life ==
Jeremiah Watkins Clapp was born on September 24, 1814, in Abingdon, Virginia. His father, Dr Earl B. Clapp, was a surgeon from Virginia. His mother, Elizabeth Craig, was the daughter of Captain Robert Craig; she was of Scotch-Irish descent.

Clapp was educated at the Abingdon Academy. He graduated from Hampden–Sydney College in 1835. After clerking for John William Clark Watson in Abingdon, he was admitted to the bar in 1839.

== Career ==
Clapp practised the Law in Abingdon, Virginia, from 1839 to 1841. He moved his practise to Holly Springs, Mississippi in 1841. He was also the owner of large plantations in Mississippi and Arkansas, holding thirty four people as slaves in 1860.

Clapp was a Whig until 1850, when he joined the States' Rights Party. From 1856 to 1858, he served in the Mississippi House of Representatives, representing Marshall County, Mississippi. During the 1860 presidential campaign, he was an elector for John C. Breckinridge's campaign.

At the outset of the Civil War, Clapp attended the Mississippi Secession Convention and voted in favor of leaving the Union. He then represented the state of Mississippi in the First Confederate Congress from 1862 to 1864.

To assist the Confederate States Army, Clapp was asked by Christopher Memminger, the Confederate Secretary of the Treasury, to oversee cotton production in Mississippi as well as parts of Alabama and Louisiana. Clapp would ensure that cotton be turned into Confederate uniforms and sent to Richmond, Virginia, where General Richard Taylor distributed them. Clapp served in this capacity until Union General Edward Canby forced him to hand over the cotton in New Orleans, Louisiana. Meanwhile, Clapp turned down Canby's offer to serve in the same capacity for the Union Army.

Clapp moved his legal practise to Memphis, Tennessee in 1866. During the 1876 presidential election, he was an elector for Samuel J. Tilden. From 1878 to 1880, he served in the Mississippi State Senate.

== Personal life ==
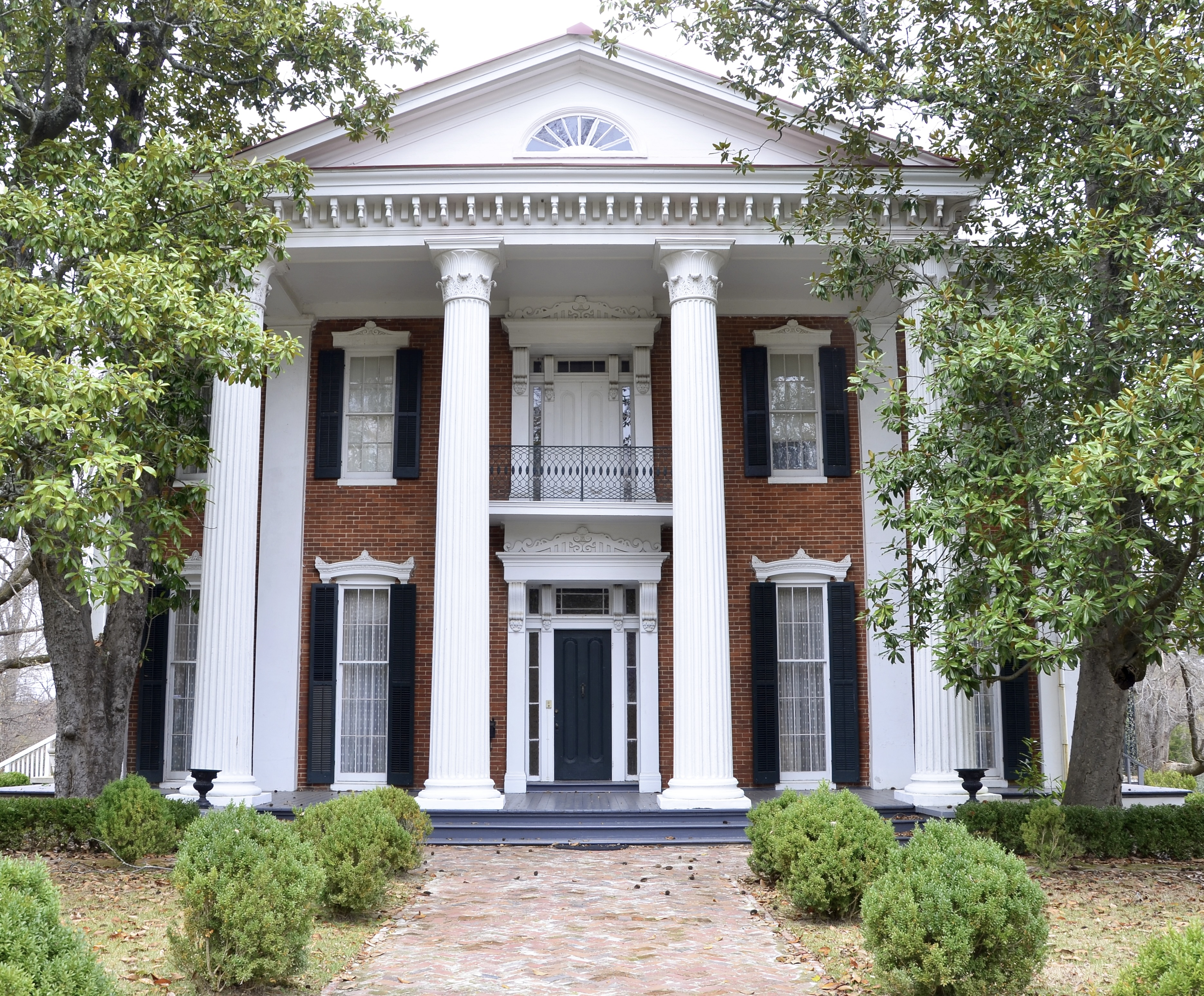
Oakleigh in Holly Springs, Mississippi.

Clapp married Evelina D. Lucas, the daughter of Colonel P. W. Lucas, in May 1843. They resided at Oakleigh, a mansion built for them in Holly Springs, Mississippi in 1858, and later in Memphis. They had eight children, including W. L. Clapp, who served as the Speaker of the Tennessee House of Representatives from 1887 to 1891, and as the Mayor of Memphis, Tennessee from 1895 to 1898.

Clapp became a Master Mason in Abingdon, Virginia in 1836. He attended the Presbyterian church in Holly Springs, and the Second Presbyterian Church in Memphis.

== Death ==
Clapp died on September 5, 1898, in Memphis, Tennessee. He was buried at the Elmwood Cemetery.
