= Robert Porterfield =

American actor and director (1905–1971)

Robert Huffard Porterfield (December 21, 1905 – October 28, 1971) was an American actor and theatre director who was known for founding the Barter Theatre in Abingdon, Virginia.

The theatre was founded in 1933 during the Great Depression. In 1941, it was designated as the State Theatre of Virginia, but with the bombing of Pearl Harbor and America entering World War II, the grant promised by the Commonwealth of Virginia's legislature was put off. Young men either enlisted or were drafted into the U.S. military, and the theatre went dark from 1942 to 1945. Porterfield, too, was drafted. He returned to Abingdon in 1946 to reopen the theatre. As promised in 1941, the legislature came through with a $10,000 grant.

Porterfield served as artistic director of the year-round repertory theatre until his death in 1971. His most prominent, credited film role was in the 1941 film Sergeant York in which he portrayed Zeb Andrews, a local rival of the title character played by Gary Cooper.

== Family history ==
Robert Porterfield was born in Austinville, in Wythe County, Virginia, the fifth generation of Porterfields born in the United States. His great-great-great-grandfather arrived in the American colonies from Scotland in about 1760, probably through the port of Philadelphia. Like many immigrants of Scots, Irish, Scots-Irish, or German descent, he traveled from Pennsylvania down the Wilderness Road into the lush and fertile Shenandoah Valley. Finding that most of the best land was already staked out and occupied, he pushed on until finding some "unclaimed" real estate in Southwest Virginia, what is now called Glade Spring.

== Early life and education ==
Born December 21, 1905, near Austinville, Virginia, Robert was the third of six sons of Daisy (Huffard) and William Breckenridge Porterfield.

In 1909, Robert's father accepted a position as overseer of some 20,000 acres (81 km^{2}) of land and moved the family to Saltville, Virginia. The family's new home was a large farmhouse about a mile south of the town. Robert and his brothers shared in all the work of the farm. At the age of seven, Robert staged his first play for cousins, with extended family as players and audience, in the family's two-story barn.

The Porterfields were quite prosperous by the standards of the day. They were the first family to have a dial telephone, thanks to his father's being elected as Mayor of Saltville, 1920–24 and 1926–29. They also installed central heating in their house.

His mother taught Robert to read before he started school, but his formal education began in a one-room schoolhouse with a pot-bellied wood stove; about four grades were gathered together. He learned much of Shakespeare by his teacher's practice of having "Shakespeare quotation" bees. He would go home afterward and pore over his family's volumes of Shakespeare, culling new lines for the next bee. At the age of ten, Robert announced to his father his intention of becoming an actor. His father was very much against the idea.

As a youngster Robert learned to fish for trout, rock bass and gig giant bullfrogs from the North Fork of the Holston River. He also learned how to shoot guns, along with hunting and trapping. His favorite was raccoon hunting.

The first great sorrow of his life happened when he was twelve years old. He had fallen in love with a girl named Mary. One spring Sunday morning, he was supposed to meet her for Sunday school but she never came. He learned later that day that she had died in her sleep the night before. The brokenhearted Porterfield ran away for a while; when he returned home, he found his mother waiting up for him with hot milk toast. Mary's family gave the boy a gold heart locket which she had worn. Robert kept that locket close to him for the remainder of his life.

He joined the school debating society for the chance to perform in front of audiences. He became the spark plug that instigated class plays at Saltville High School.

He almost married a girl named Helen, who was a few years older than Robert and lived in nearby Marion. At the last minute, he turned the car around and drove her back home.

After graduating from Saltville High School, Robert enrolled at Hampden-Sydney College in Virginia. He stayed for two years, performed with the college acting company, the Jongleurs, and became a member of the Kappa Alpha Order. Every year, the Hampden-Sydney College theater department awards one senior The Robert Porterfield Prize in Theatre who was "recognizing the great contribution to the community through the medium of theatre at Hampden-Sydney College" in his honor. While waiting for a reply to his application to the American Academy of Dramatic Arts, he took a train to Petersburg. While there, he worked as a soda jerk at the Lum's Drugstore.

Not hearing from the academy, he decided to give up on schooling and go on to New York City, the center of national theatre culture. He wrote his father to tell him he was dropping out of college and heading to New York. He spent the next few months working six days a week, saving as much money he could for his move. Although he was finally accepted to the academy, his father wrote telling him he had to return to college or come home.

Porterfield continued to work as a soda jerk until he became ill and was advised by a Petersburg doctor to return home to convalesce. He rejoined his family at their new farm of Twin Oaks, located on the outskirts of Glade Spring. His father's doctor examined him, saying he was strong as an ox. With his father's reluctant consent, Porterfield boarded a train to New York City.

== At the academy ==
In the fall of 1926, Porterfield arrived at New York's Pennsylvania Station and went to the American Academy of Dramatic Arts. Upon arrival, he was taken to the president's office, where he was asked to give a two-minute audition in front of a committee of faculty members. When he finished, the faculty members told him that "not one of us were able to understand a word you said. If you want to become an actor, you have to lose that southern accent and quickly."

Living in a small apartment above a speakeasy on 85th Street and Riverside Drive, Porterfield studied for two years at the academy, immersing himself in what he described as "a necessary stage in my development as an actor."

== Barter Theatre ==
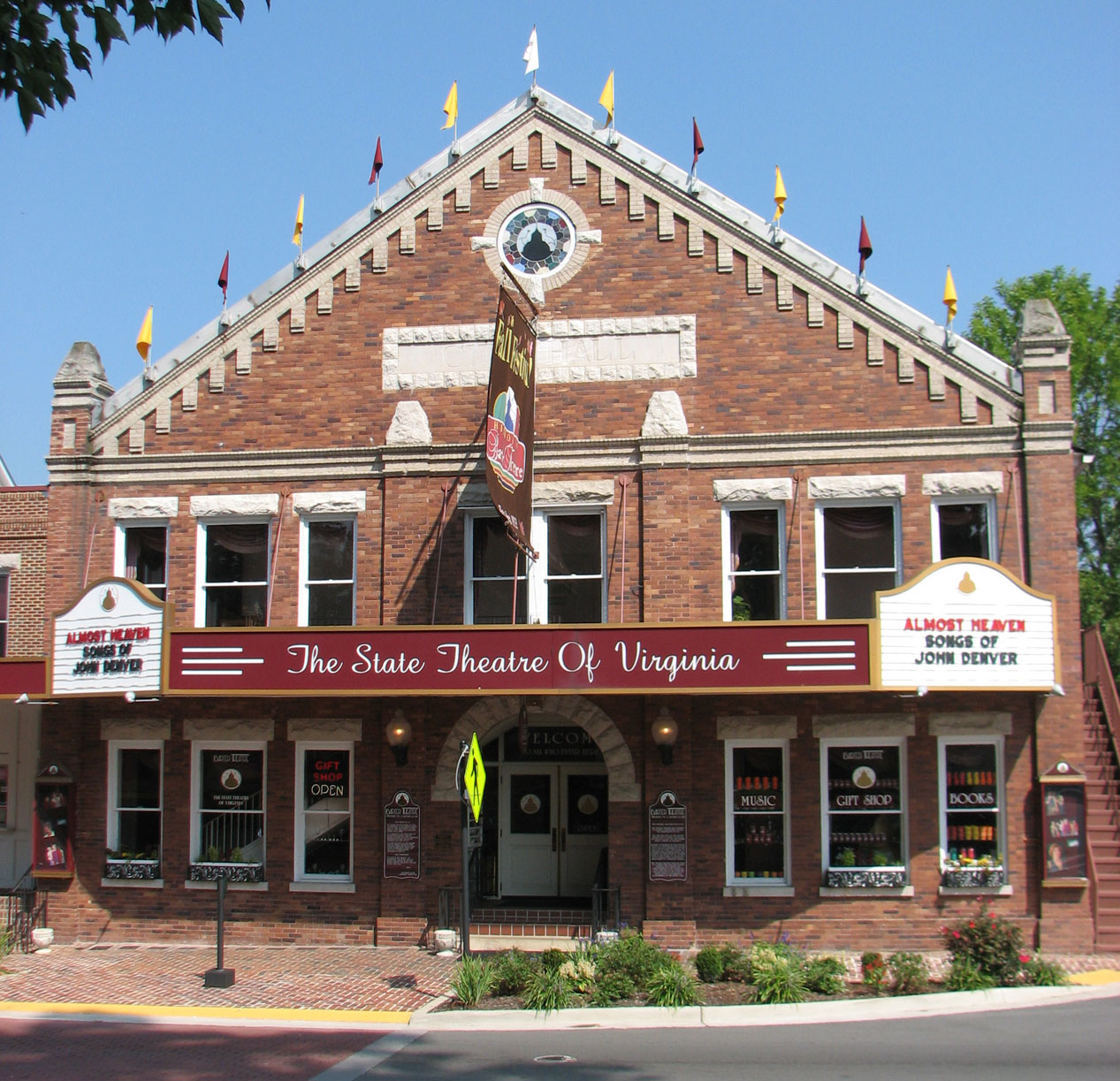
Barter Theatre

After his father's death, Porterfield inherited Twin Oaks, and he returned to Glade Spring in western Virginia. But his interest in theatre continued. During the Great Depression, in 1933 he created the Barter Theatre as a repertory company in nearby Abingdon, Virginia. He allowed residents to barter food for theatre admission during the lean years, which gave rise to what became the formal name.

In establishing and running the repertory company, Porterfield gave opportunities to many young actors early in their careers, including Gregory Peck, Ernest Borgnine, Patricia Neal, Ned Beatty, Hume Cronyn, Gary Collins, and Larry Linville. His theatre participated in the Equity Membership Candidate Program (EMC) for the Actors' Equity Association. Actors and stage managers-in-training could get credit for their work in such theatres toward eventual membership in Equity.

While most of his work was in theatre, Porterfield also had occasional minor roles in films, from 1937 to 1958. (See "Filmography" section below.)

== Marriage and family ==
Porterfield married Helen Fritz on May 12, 1934. She died on New Year's Day 1949, having struggled most of her life with alcoholism, from which her father also suffered. It was considered the cause of her death. She did not learn until 1941 that her father had died of alcoholism. Robert and Helen did not have children.

Porterfield married again on October 6, 1964, to Mary Dudley. In 1968, the two adopted a five-year-old boy, whom they named Jay Payne Porterfield. Robert nicknamed him "Jay Bird". They were married until Robert's death on October 28, 1971, in Abingdon. She continued to live as a widow at the Porterfield home, Twin Oaks.

== Quotes ==
"If you like us, talk about us. And if you don't, just keep your mouth shut."- Porterfield said this at the end of his introductory speech before each performance."

"He gave me my start in the business, and every time I see my Oscar, I remember him fondly". – Ernest Borgnine on Robert Porterfield.

== Filmography ==
Year	Title	Role	Notes
1937	They Won't Forget	Jimmy Harrison (Dissenting Juror)	Uncredited
1941	Sergeant York	Zeb Andrews	
1946	The Yearling	Mate	Uncredited
1958	Thunder Road	Preacher	Uncredited, (final film role)

== Awards ==
- In 1948, he won the Regional Theatre Tony Award for his "Contribution to Development of Regional Theatre".
- That year, he was awarded an honorary degree of Doctor of Letters by his alma mater Hampden-Sydney College for his contributions to theatre.
- In 1957, he was named "First Citizen of Abingdon" and also presented with the "Actors' Fund Award of Merit".
- In 1963, he was given the "Thomas Jefferson Award" for public relations on behalf of Virginia.
- In 1967, the "Suzanne Davis Memorial Award" for contributions to theatre in the South was awarded to him, as was the "Special Service Award" from the Virginia State Chamber of Commerce.
- Porterfield Hall at Radford University is named after him.
