= Barter Theatre =

Theater in Abingdon, Virginia, United States

Coordinates: 36.71226°N 81.97131°W

- Barter Theare
- Formation: 1933
- Type: Theatre group
- Location: 127 West Main Street, Abingdon, Virginia
- Artistic director: Katy Brown
- Website: www.bartertheatre.com

Barter Theatre, in Abingdon, Virginia, opened on June 10, 1933. It is the longest-running professional Equity theatre in the United States.

== History ==
=== Concept ===
In 1933, when the United States was in the middle of the Great Depression, many people could not afford to pay for theater tickets, and many actors had trouble finding employment. A review by Paul Dellinger in the December 17, 2006 issue of The Roanoke Times summarized the situation as follows:

But Broadway was not doing so much swinging during the Depression, when theaters went dark and actors found themselves out of work. Back in Porterfield's part of Virginia, farmers were stuck with crops they couldn't sell. That was when Porterfield came up with his genius of an idea, bringing actors to Abingdon to barter their performances for farm goods.

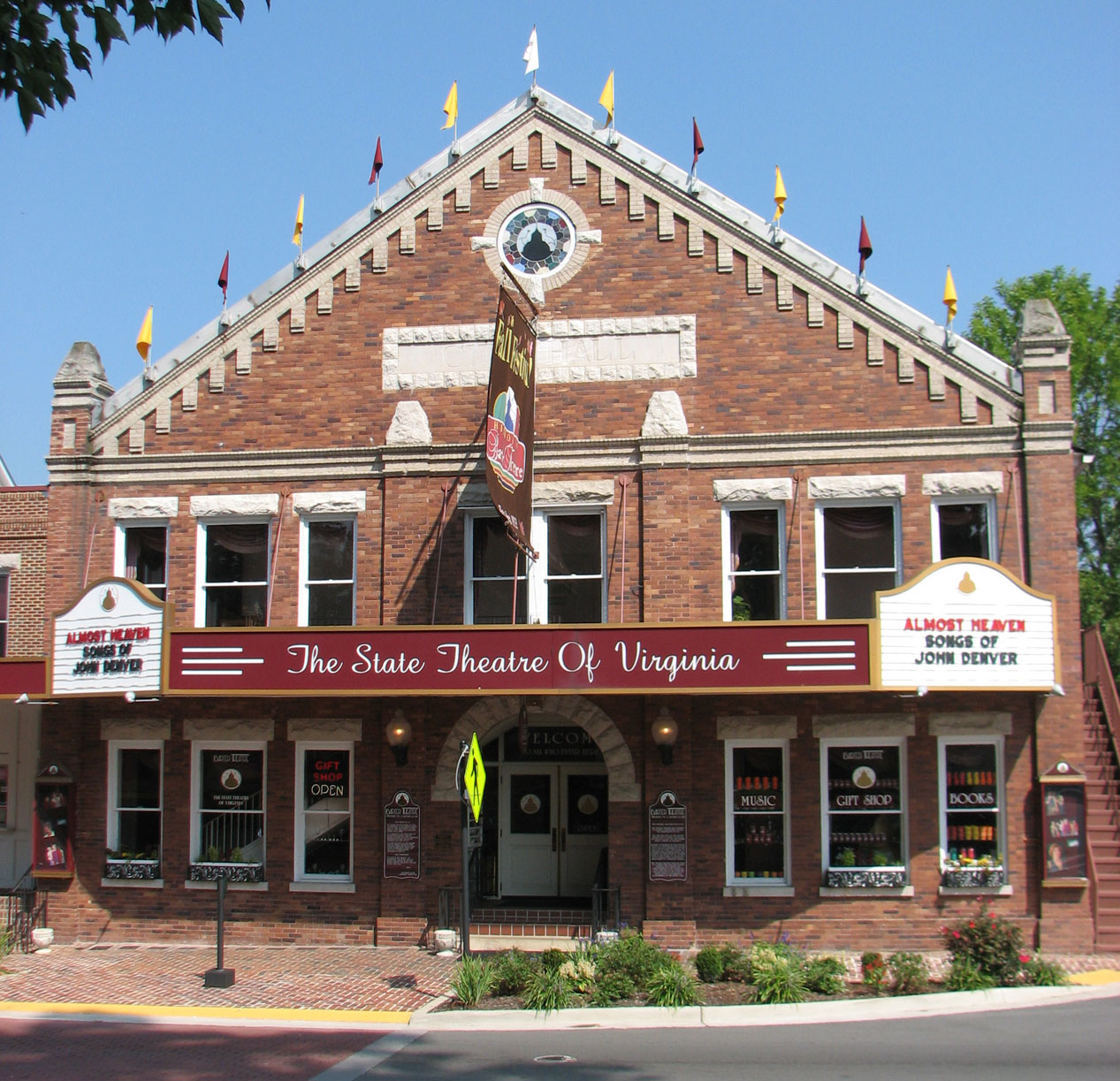
Barter Theatre

Beginning with "some twenty of his fellow actors", Robert Porterfield, founder of the theatre, offered admission by letting the local people pay with food goods, hence the name "Barter". He said, "With vegetables that you cannot sell you can buy a good laugh."

The original ticket price for a play was 30 cents, or the equivalent in goods. Referring to the barter concept, an article in Life magazine's July 31, 1939, issue reported, "What sounded like the craziest idea in the history of the U.S. theater is now a booming success."

Actors were kept very busy, even when they did not have parts in current plays. They contributed to the theatre's overall success by working on scenery, collecting props, directing and working in the cafeteria at the Barter Inn, where members of the troupe boarded.

=== First production ===
Barter Theatre's first production was After Tomorrow by John Golden. An Associated Press news story reported that the production "was played to a capacity audience that came laden with cakes, fruit, vegetables, poultry" and a live pig.

=== Outreach ===
While remaining based in Abingdon, Barter Theatre has presented plays over a broad geographical area. A September 1939 trip took the group to New York City, performing at the Heckscher Theater. On three nights the troupe presented Lady Baltimore, Everywhere I Roam, and "a mountain version of Romeo and Juliet". In 1949, one of its companies produced Hamlet in Elsinore, Denmark. That same year it had a touring company that did one-night stands in localities in Virginia, Kentucky, Tennessee and North Carolina.

In 1993, the First Light Players were founded, a troupe within the Barter dedicated to theatre for young audiences. Today, they live on as the Barter Players, bringing live theatre to young audiences across under-served regions in the South and East coast.

In 2014 the Barter Theatre and the William King Art Center collaborated to produce an art exhibition by Abingdon artists affiliated with the two institutions.

=== Facilities ===
Initially, the theatre's plays were performed in the Abingdon Opera House, and actors stayed at the Martha Washington Inn. In 1935, it moved to the campus of the defunct Stonewall Jackson College for Women. The 1939 article in Life reported that the actors received no pay but were fed well and were housed in the former college's dormitories. The troupe produced plays in the auditorium on the campus. Productions branched out into the surrounding area after three nights on campus, going "on a ten-day tour of mountain towns and resorts in an ancient bus widely known as 'Bessie.'"

The facility in which actors stayed became known as the Barter Inn. Besides housing members of the theatre, the inn offered a limited number of reservations for the public, which provided an opportunity for people to eat with the actors in the inn's cafeteria. In 1950, novelist James Hilton purchased "several acres of land adjoining the Barter Theater [sic] ... to protect the view from the Barter Inn" after the property had been advertised as being available for building sites.

In 1996, a $1.7 million renovation of the building was completed. The depth of the stage was increased from 28 feet to 60 feet. New lighting and sound systems were installed, and the heating and air-conditioning systems were upgraded. The balcony was extended to provide more seats and a better view from that level.

== Current status ==
Today, Barter is one of the last year-round professional resident repertory theaters remaining in the United States.

The current building, originally Sinking Springs Presbyterian Church built in 1833, is the second-oldest theatrical building in the United States. In 1953, its interior was renovated with fittings from the Empire Theatre in New York. The seats from that renovation were later replaced with seats from the Jefferson Theatre in Falls Church, Virginia, after it closed.

Each year, Barter Theatre celebrates its heritage with Barter Days. For these performances, patrons are invited to barter for admission by bringing the equivalent amount of canned food. All food is donated to a local charity.

== Directors ==
Porterfield served as director until his death in 1971. Rex Partington was selected as the next artistic director, serving from 1972 to 1992. From 1992–2019, Richard Rose served as the Barter Theatre's third artistic director. In 2019, Katy Brown, the longtime director of the Barter Players, took over as the fourth and first female artistic director. The Barter's continued success under their leadership made it the first regional theater "to survive the passing of its founder."

== Actors ==
Many well-known stars of stage, screen and television have performed early in their careers at Barter, including Gregory Peck, Ernest Borgnine, Patricia Neal, Ned Beatty, Hume Cronyn, Gary Collins, Frances Fisher, Kevin Spacey, Larry Linville, John Glover, Jim Varney, and Wayne Knight. Will Bigham, the 2007 winner of On The Lot, acted at Barter Theatre for several years.

== Facilities ==
The theatre is located within the Abingdon Historic District. The main theatre (named Gilliam Stage) has 505 seats with 216 of those in the balcony, and Barter Stage II (Named Smith Theatre) has 167.

Starting in 2020, the theatre has been producing plays and staging them at the Moonlite Theatre. Plays are performed on a stage while being simultaneously projected on the big screen. Seating in cars allows for social distancing and audio is provided through car radios. This was begun to allow staging of plays with coronavirus precautions in place and plays were produced there from July 2020 through December 2021. Indoor performances resumed at Gilliam Stage in September 2021, with protocols in place to keep actors, staff, crew, and audience as safe as possible during the ongoing pandemic.

== Honors ==
- 1946: Designated as the State Theatre of Virginia
- 1948: Tony Regional Theatre Award
- 2006: Business of the Year Award for the Tri-Cities, Virginia/Tennessee region
- 2008: Overall State Winner for Small Companies for The Torchbearer Award by the Virginia Chamber of Commerce

== Barter Theatre Award ==
In 1939, the theatre first presented the Barter Theatre Award "for the outstanding performance by an American player." The initial recipient was Laurette Taylor, and the 1940 award went to Dorothy Stickney. Each winner received an acre of mountain land near Abingdon and a Virginia ham and selected two actors to perform with the theatre. The deed to the land was transferred from Taylor to Stickney at the award ceremony for the latter.
