= Abingdon Historic District =

Historic district in Virginia, United States

- U.S. National Register of Historic Places
- U.S. Historic district
- Virginia Landmarks Register
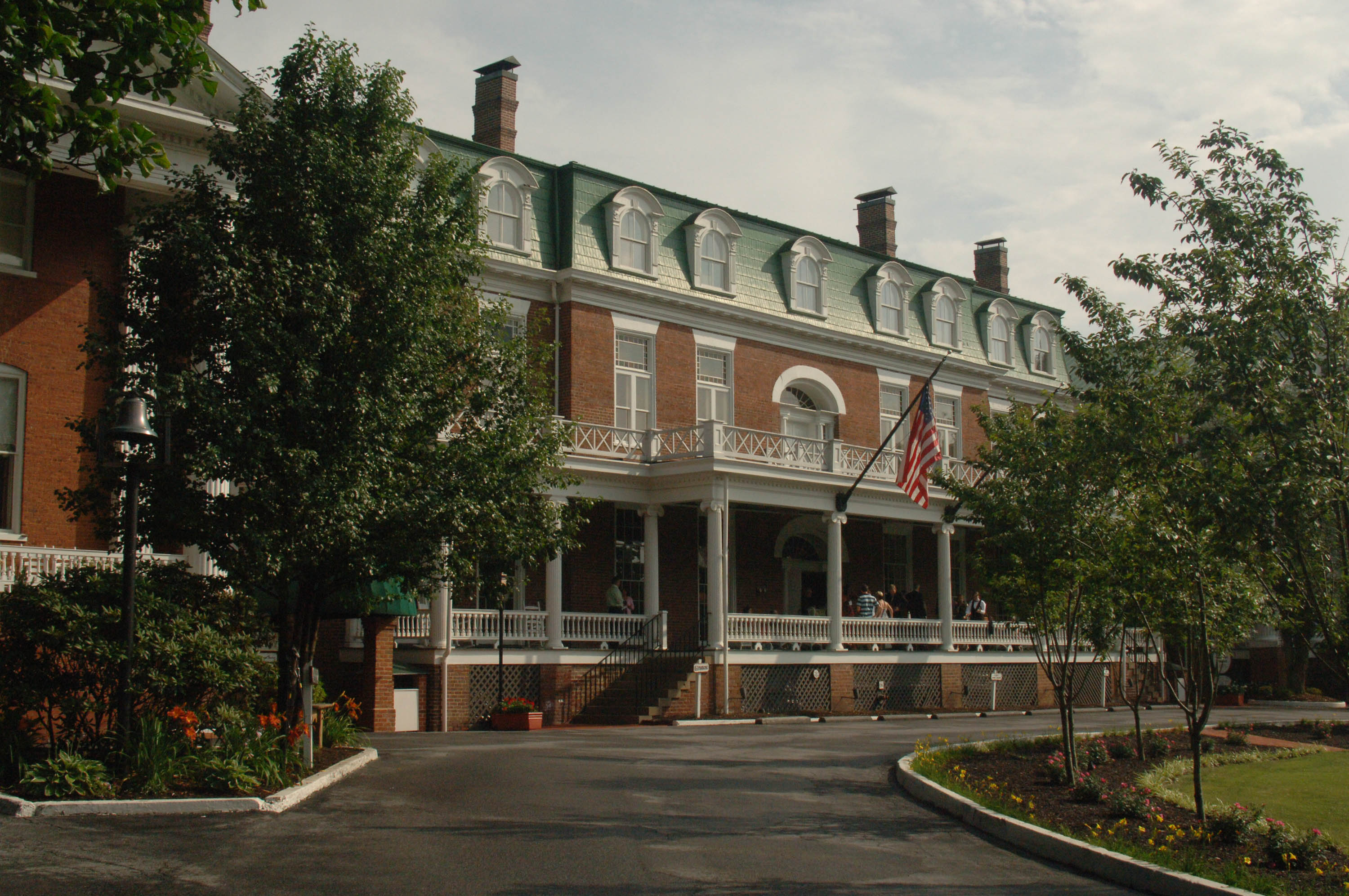
- Martha Washington Inn, June 2007

- Location within Virginia Location within the United States
- Location: Both sides of Main St. between Cummings and Deadmore Sts.; Roughly bounded by Russell Rd. and Jackson St., Whites Mill Rd., E. Main and E. Park and W. Main Sts., and Academy Dr., Abingdon, Virginia
- Coordinates: 36°42′33″N 81°58′18″W
- Area: 159.5 acres (64.5 ha)
- Built: 1778
- Architectural style: Colonial Revival, Bungalow/craftsman, Queen Anne
- NRHP reference No.: 70000831, 86002193 (Boundary Increase)
- VLR No.: 140-0037, 140–0039

Significant dates
- Added to NRHP: February 26, 1970, September 17, 1986 (Boundary Increase)
- Designated VLR: December 2, 1969, April 15, 1986

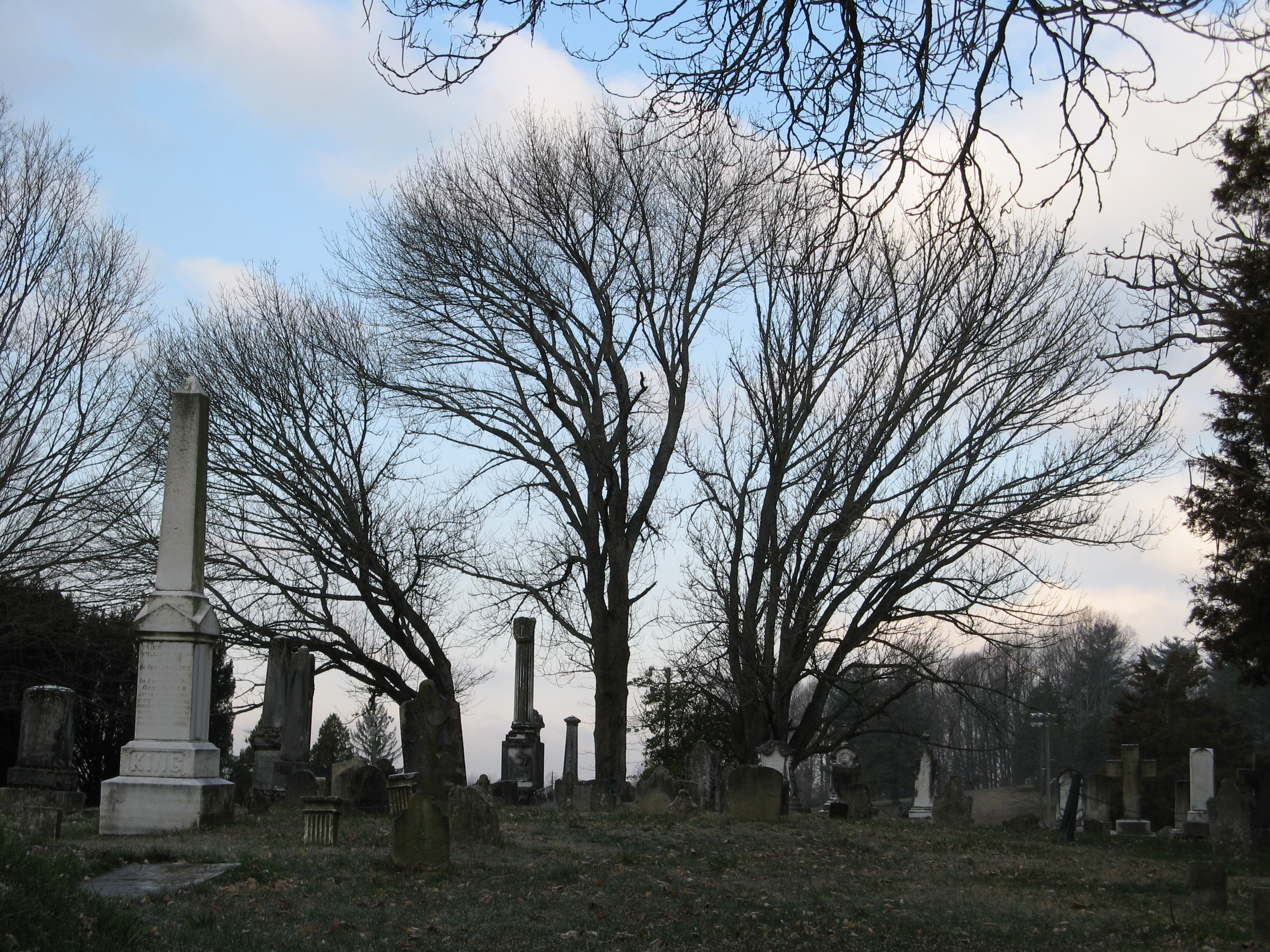
Sinking Spring Cemetery, a contributing property to the district

Abingdon Historic District is a national historic district located at Abingdon, Washington County, Virginia. The district encompasses 145 contributing buildings, 2 contributing site, and 13 contributing structures in the town of Abingdon. It includes a variety of residential, commercial, and institutional buildings dating from the late-18th century to the mid-20th century. Notable contributing resources include Sinking Spring Cemetery, William King High School (1913), General Francis Preston House (1832), Martha Washington Inn, Barter Theatre, the Virginia House, Alexander Findlay House (1827), Gabriel Stickley House (c. 1830), Ann Berry House (c. 1830), Washington County Courthouse (1868), Rev. Charles Cummings House (c. 1773), and James Fields House (1857). Located in the district and separately listed are the Abingdon Bank and Dr. William H. Pitts House.

It was listed on the National Register of Historic Places in 1970, with a boundary increase in 1986.

Representative buildings
Name	Address	Year Built	Architectural Style	Comments
Alexander Findlay House	101 Valley St., N.E.	1827	Federal	This is the oldest surviving building on Valley Street
Gabriel Stickley House	239 Valley St., N.E.	c. 1830	Federal	Amongst the oldest surviving buildings on Valley Street
Daniel Trigg House	210 Valley St., N.E.	Early to mid 19th Century	Vernacular	Representative of mid 1800s middle class architecture
Daniel Musser House	247 Valley St., N.E.	1869	Italianate	This house is one of several on Valley Street that was considered "fashionable", representing prosperity after the Civil War
David G. Thomas House	153 Valley St., N.E.	1870s	Italianate	This house is one of several on Valley Street that was considered "fashionable", representing prosperity after the Civil War
	185 Valley St., N.E.	1900	Vernacular	Representative of mid to late 1800s middle class architecture
152 Valley St., Abingdon, VA	152 Valley St., N.E.	1890s	Vernacular	Representative of late to mid 1800s middle class architecture
315 Valley St., Abingdon, VA	315 Valley St., N.E.	1890s	Vernacular	Representative of late to mid 1800s middle class architecture
337 Valley St., N.E., Abingdon, VA	337 Valley St., N.E.	1890s	Modified Queen Anne	
164 Valley St., N.W., Abingdon, VA	164 Valley St., N.W.	1890s	Modified Queen Anne	
125 Valley St., N.W., Abingdon, VA	125 Valley St., N.W.	1920s	Colonial Revival	
274 Valley St., N.W., Abingdon, VA	274 Valley St., N.W.	c. 1900	Modified Queen Anne	
Dr. William H. Pitts House	247 E. Main St.	1854	Greek Revival. Its exterior stucco walls are unique to the Abingdon Historic District	Listed on the National Register of Historic Places in 2002
Washington County Courthouse	N.W. corner of N. Court and E. Main St.	1868	Building has four Greek Doric Columns, and an Italianate cornice and tower.	Three earlier courthouses stood on this site, the first constructed in 1800. Present building replaced previous that was burned during the Civil War.
Abingdon Bank	225 E. Main St., Abingdon, VA	c. 1845	Greek Revival/Late Victorian architecture	Originally housed a resident cashier and his family in one section, and bank, counting room, and vault in the other.
Fields-Penn House	208 W. Main St.	1860	Georgian proportions and Greek Revival elements	In 1971, the Penn family sold the home to the Penn House Preservation Foundation, which later conveyed it to the Town of Abingdon. The William King Regional Arts Center managed the home beginning in 1995. Today, the Fields-Penn 1860 House museum is operated by the Town of Abingdon
The Tavern	222 E. Main St.	1779		This is the oldest building in Abingdon. During the past two centuries, The Tavern has served as a tavern, bank, bakery, general store, cabinet shop, barber shop, private residence, post office, antique shop and restaurant. It also served as a hospital for wounded Confederate and Union soldiers during the Civil War.
Sinking Spring Presbyterian Church	136 E. Main St.	1851	Greek Revival	First located at the Sinking Spring Cemetery in the early 1700s, the first Presbyterian Church was a log structure. The congregation was moved to what is now known as the Barter Theater in 1833. In 1837 the church divided, and one group moved to the present location
Barter Theater	127 W. Main St.	Early-mid 1800s	Unclassified	The earliest theatrical event known to occur here was a production of the Virginian on January 14, 1876. In 1890, the Sons of Temperance transferred the building's title to the Town of Abingdon, to be used as a town hall for the benefit of the citizenry. It opened as a theater on June 10, 1933. It is one of the longest-running professional theaters in the nation.In 1933, when the country was in the middle of the Great Depression, most patrons were not able to pay the full ticket price. Robert Porterfield, founder of the theatre, offered admission by letting the local people pay with food goods, hence the name "Barter".
Martha Washington Inn	150 W. Main St.	1832	Unclassified	It was built as a private residence for General Francis Preston and Sarah Buchanan Preston and their nine children. The original brick residence still comprises the central structure of The Martha Washington Hotel and the original living room of the Preston family is now the main lobby of the hotel. In 1858 the Preston family home was purchased for the mansion to become an upscale college for young women. The school was named Martha Washington College. The college operated for over 70 years through the years of the Civil War and the Great Depression. During the Civil War the grounds became training barracks for the Washington Mounted Rifles. Union and Confederate troops were involved in frequent skirmishes in and around Abingdon with the College serving as a makeshift hospital for the wounded, both Confederate and Union. The Martha was closed in 1932. In 1935, The Martha Washington opened as a hotel
