= Gillian Oyos =

American footballer (born 2000)

Personal information
- Full name: Gillian Oyos
- Date of birth: June 14, 2000 (age 26)
- Place of birth: Abingdon, Virginia, US
- Height: 5 ft 4 in (1.63 m)
- Position: Midfielder

Team information
- Current team: Asheville City
- Number: 3

Youth career
- FC Alliance

College career
Years	Team	Apps	(Gls)
2018–2021	UNC Asheville Bulldogs	61	(7)

Senior career*
Years	Team	Apps	(Gls)
2019–2022	Asheville City	27	(2)
2022–2023	Newcastle United	8	(0)
2022	→ Newcastle United Development	2	(0)
2023	Northumbria University		
2023–	Asheville City	15	(1)
- * Club domestic league appearances and goals

Gillian Oyos (born June 14, 2000) is an American soccer player, playing as a midfielder for Asheville City SC in the USL W League.

== Youth and college ==
=== FC Alliance ===
Oyos played for FC Alliance in the ECNL before moving to Asheville City SC.

=== Asheville City SC ===
Oyos wore the number 19 shirt while playing at Asheville City SC. She made her debut for Asheville City SC in the 2018 season in a 1–1 draw against Wofford, where she assisted Justine James. She appeared in all 16 matches and scored two goals in games against The Citadel and Longwood in September. She played a total of 1,415 minutes as a freshman.

In the 2019 season Oyos competed in all 18 matches and scored three goals for the club in matches against USC Upstate, Hampton and Presbyterian. She played a total of 1,447 minutes as a sophomore.

== Club career ==
=== Asheville City SC ===
Oyos appeared in all 9 matches for the club in the 2020 season and scored 1 goal. Her goal came in a 2–1 win over USC Upstate in March. She played a total of 739 minutes.

In the 2021 season Oyos competed in all 18 matches and scored 1 goal, playing a total of 1,443 minutes for the club.

On October 28, 2021, Asheville City announced Oyos won the All-Big South Women's Soccer recognition for the second-team all-conference.

In the 2022 season Oyos played in 10 matches and scored no goals, playing a total of 662 minutes.

=== Newcastle United ===
Oyos moved to Newcastle United in August 2022. While playing for Newcastle United Oyos also played for Northumbria University. She made her debut for Newcastle on September 24 in a 9–1 win over Lincoln City. In November she played in Newcastle United Women's first game at St. James' Park in a 2–1 win against Barnsley Women, coming on as a late substitute for Georgia Gibson. Oyos finished the 2022–23 season with 8 appearances for Newcastle United.

Along with appearing for the Newcastle United first team, Oyos also made two appearances for the newly launched development team in matches against Stockport County Ladies Reserves and Leeds United Women Reserves.

In March 2023 Newcastle announced that Oyos would return to Asheville City SC for their summer season but would return to Newcastle.

=== Return to Asheville City SC ===
In the summer of 2023, Oyos returned to Asheville City SC, wearing the number 19 shirt. She played her first game in a 3–0 loss against Wake FC. Oyos scored for Asheville on July 2, 2023, as they defeated Wake FC 4-1.

== Honors ==
=== Newcastle United ===
- FA Women's National League Division One North 2022–23

=== Newcastle United Women Development ===
- FA Women's National League Reserve Plate 2022–23
- Bluefin Sports Insurance Women's Cup 2022–23
