= Abingdon Bank =

United States historic place

- U.S. National Register of Historic Places
- U.S. Historic district – Contributing property
- Virginia Landmarks Register
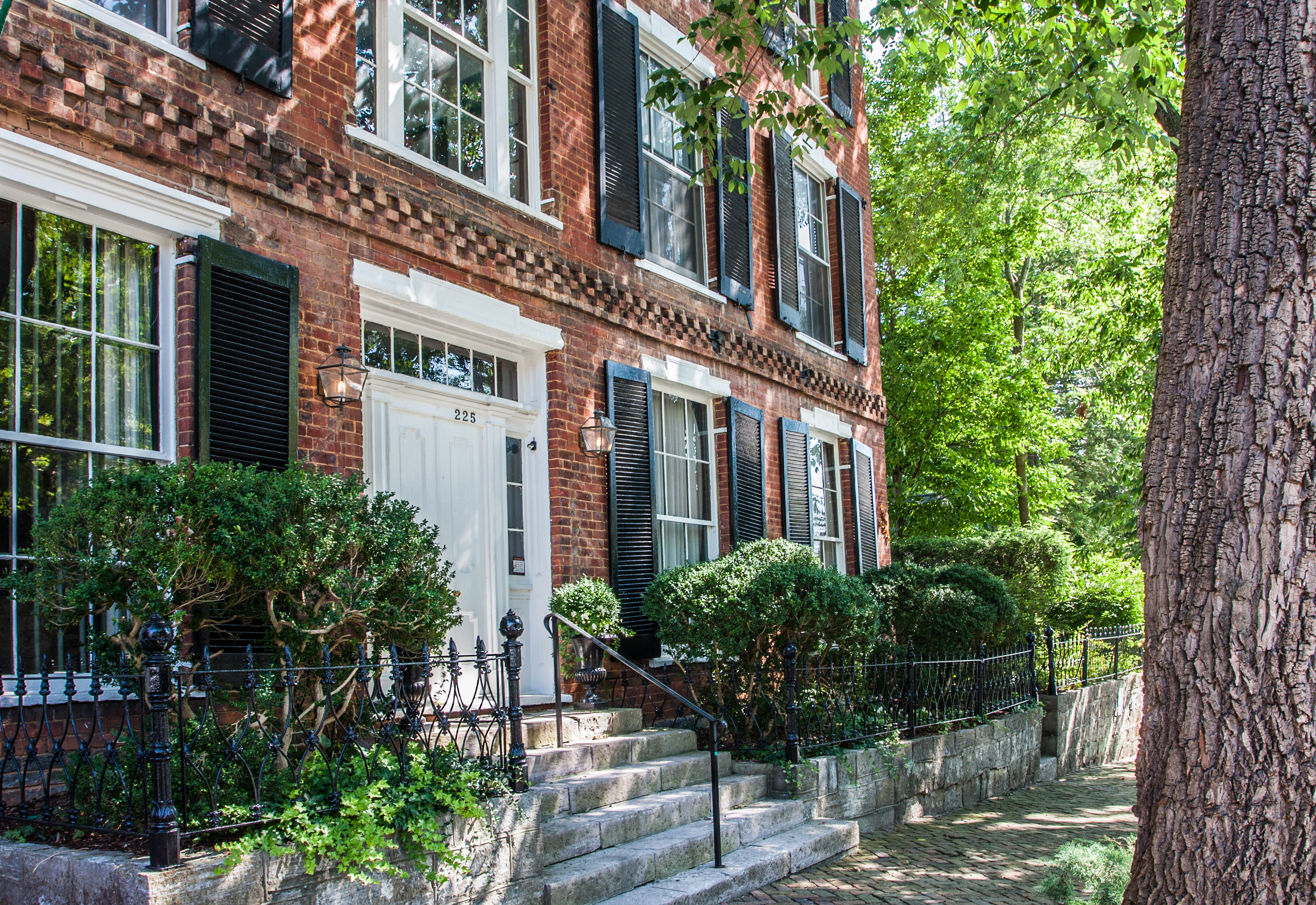
- Abingdon Bank, July 2013

- Location within Virginia Location within the United States
- Location: 225 E. Main St., Abingdon, Virginia
- Coordinates: 36°42′46″N 81°58′11″W
- Area: 0 acres (0 ha)
- Built: c. 1845
- Architectural style: Late Victorian, Greek Revival
- NRHP reference No.: 69000285
- VLR No.: 140-0001

Significant dates
- Added to NRHP: November 12, 1969
- Designated VLR: May 13, 1969

Abingdon Bank is a historic bank building with a residence located at Abingdon, Washington County, Virginia. It was built about 1845, and is a two-story Greek Revival / Late Victorian style brick building. It originally housed the residence of the cashier and his family in one part, and the bank, counting room, and vault were in the other.

It was listed on the National Register of Historic Places in 1969 and is located within the Abingdon Historic District.
