= Baker–St. John House =

Historic house in Virginia, United States

- U.S. National Register of Historic Places
- Virginia Landmarks Register
- Location within Virginia Location within the United States
- Location: 18254 Providence Rd. (Route 611), near Abingdon, Virginia
- Coordinates: 36°41′08″N 82°02′28″W
- Area: 2.5 acres (1.0 ha)
- Built: c. 1866
- Architectural style: Greek Revival, Italianate
- NRHP reference No.: 11000033
- VLR No.: 095-5264

Significant dates
- Added to NRHP: February 22, 2011
- Designated VLR: December 16, 2010

Baker–St. John House is a historic home located near Abingdon, Washington County, Virginia. It was built about 1866, and is a 2 1/2-story, frame dwelling with Italianate and Greek Revival stylistic elements. It sits on a limestone foundation and has a cross-gable roof. It features paired brackets along the cornice line of the house, decorative sawn brackets on the porch supports, and an extended bay window.

It was listed on the National Register of Historic Places in 2011.
