= Dr. William H. Pitts House =

Historic house in Virginia, United States

- U.S. National Register of Historic Places
- U.S. Historic district – Contributing property
- Virginia Landmarks Register
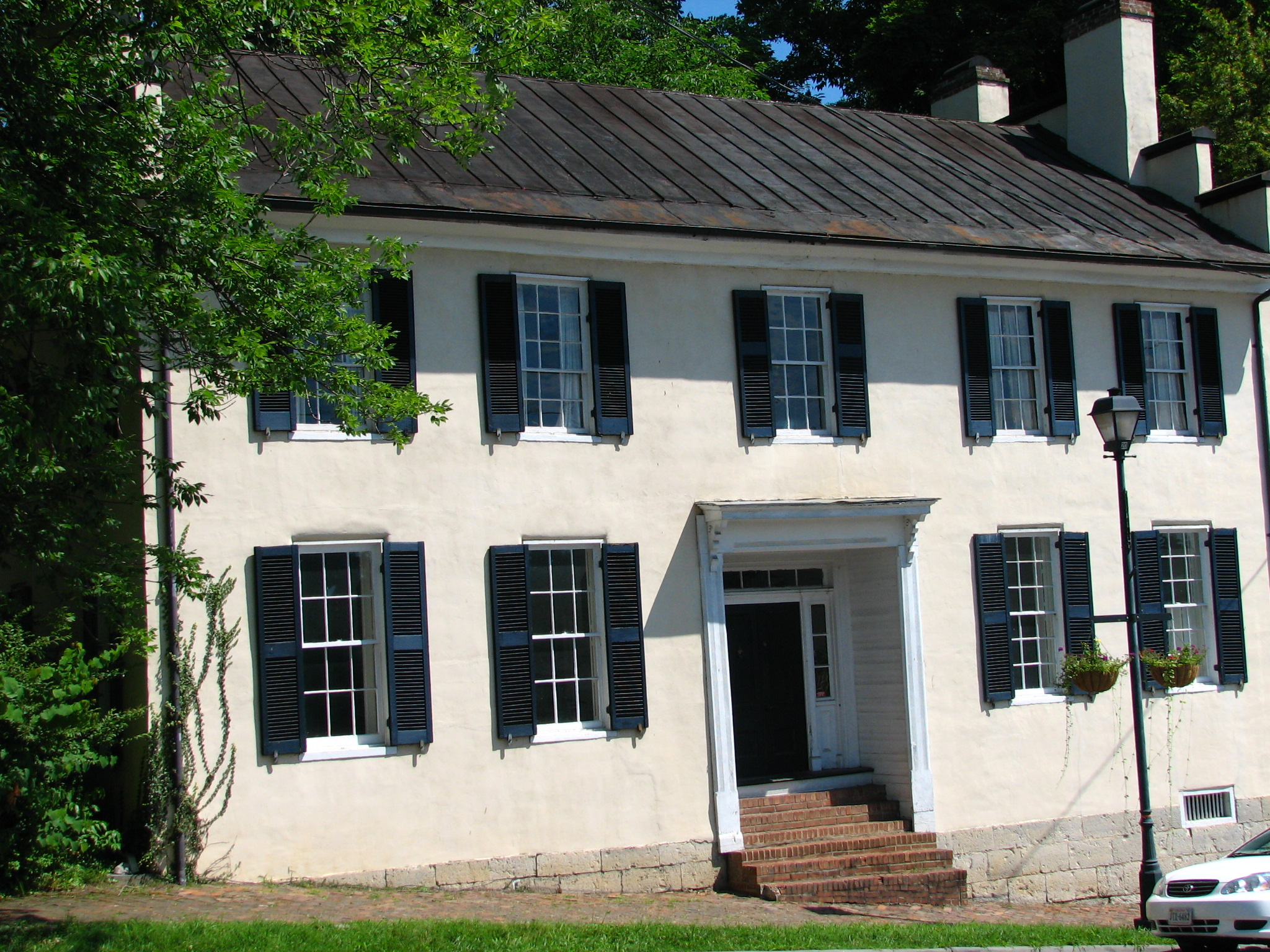

- Location within Virginia Location within the United States
- Location: 247 E. Main St., Abingdon, Virginia
- Coordinates: 36°42′45″N 81°58′5″W
- Area: less than one acre
- Built: 1854
- Built by: Hickman, Adam
- Architectural style: Greek Revival
- NRHP reference No.: 02000322
- VLR No.: 140-0022

Significant dates
- Added to NRHP: April 1, 2002
- Designated VLR: April 1, 2002

Dr. William H. Pitts House is a historic home located at Abingdon, Washington County, Virginia. It was built in 1854, and is a two-story, five-bay, stuccoed masonry, Greek Revival style dwelling. The house sits on a limestone foundation and has a gable roof with stepped-gable parapet walls flanking paired chimneys on each end. It has a recessed entrance which features a double-leaf wood entrance door surrounded by a transom and sidelights.

It was listed on the National Register of Historic Places in 2002 and is located within the Abingdon Historic District.
