= Abingdon Male Academy =

Former military academy in Virginia, US

Abingdon Male Academy was an American military academy in Abingdon, Virginia. It is established in 1803, and is now defunct. Its property is now the site of the William King Regional Arts Center.

== History ==
The Abingdon Male Academy was originally located at Court at Water Streets (now Park Street). William King, who served as a school trustee, died in 1808 and left more than 500 acres (200 ha) of land to the school, and they moved to this land in 1824.

By 1912, the town leased the land to use as the William King High School, until it closed in 1959.

One notable alumnus was Judge Jeremiah Watkins Clapp, who served in the 2nd Confederate States Congress from 1862 to 1864.
