= White's Mill (Abingdon, Virginia) =

- U.S. National Register of Historic Places
- Virginia Landmarks Register
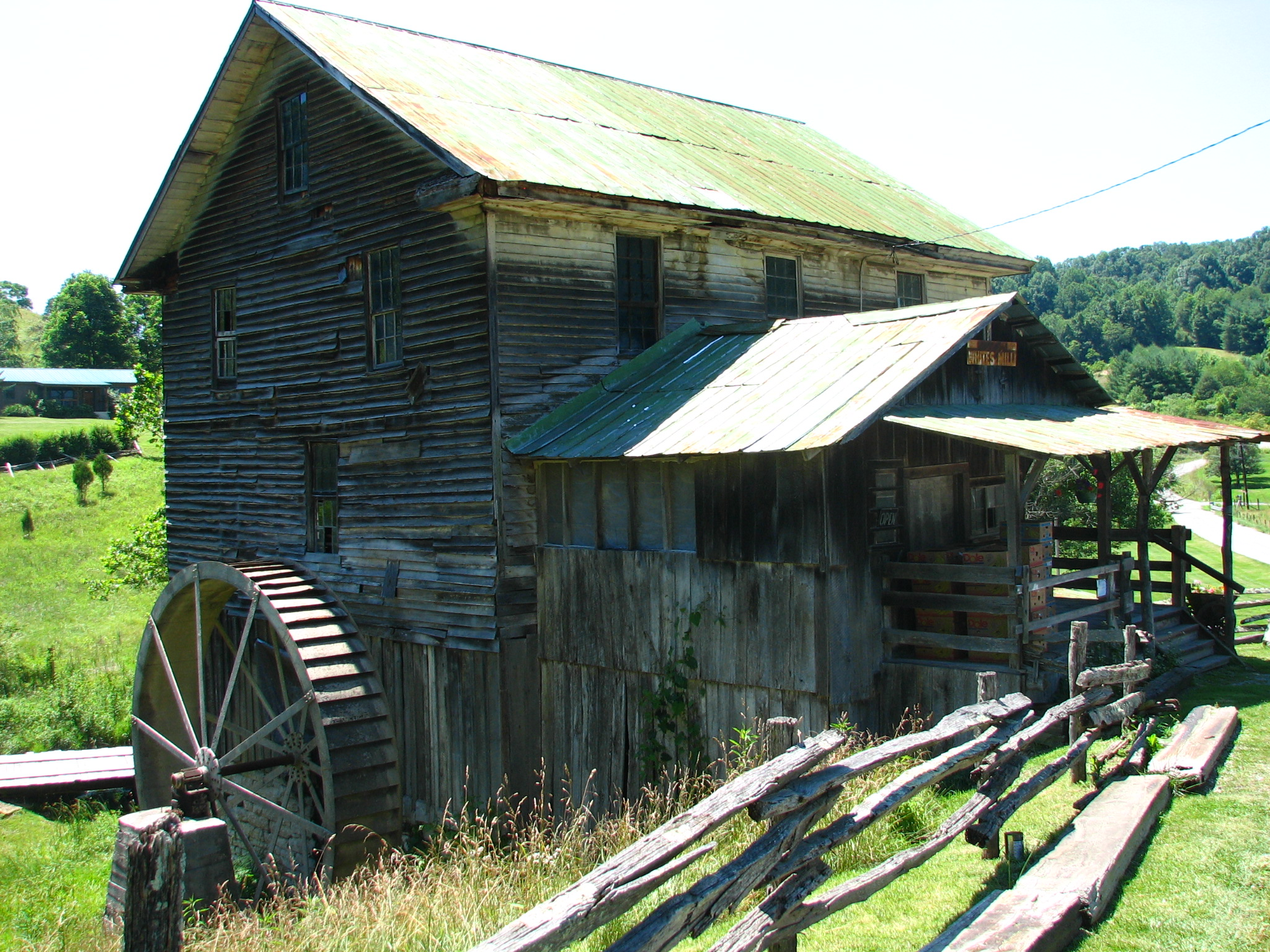
- White's Mill, April 2011

- Location within Virginia Location within the United States
- Location: NW of Abingdon on White Mill Rd., near Abingdon, Virginia
- Coordinates: 36°46′4″N 81°59′18″W
- Area: 7 acres (2.8 ha)
- NRHP reference No.: 74002149
- VLR No.: 095-0027

Significant dates
- Added to NRHP: September 10, 1974
- Designated VLR: April 16, 1974

White's Mill is a historic grist mill located near Abingdon, Washington County, Virginia. It dates to the mid-19th century, and is a frame two-story structure resting on a down slope basement with a full attic sheltered by a gable roof. It has a Fitz waterwheel and great gear wheel, buhr runs, roller mills, elevators and bolting machinery. Associated with the mill are the contributing earthen race which feeds directly into the wooden race and onto the wheel and an early coursed rubble limestone dam. The mill remains in working condition.

It was listed on the National Register of Historic Places in 1974.
