= Oakleigh (Holly Springs, Mississippi) =

Historic house in Mississippi, United States

- U.S. Historic district – Contributing property
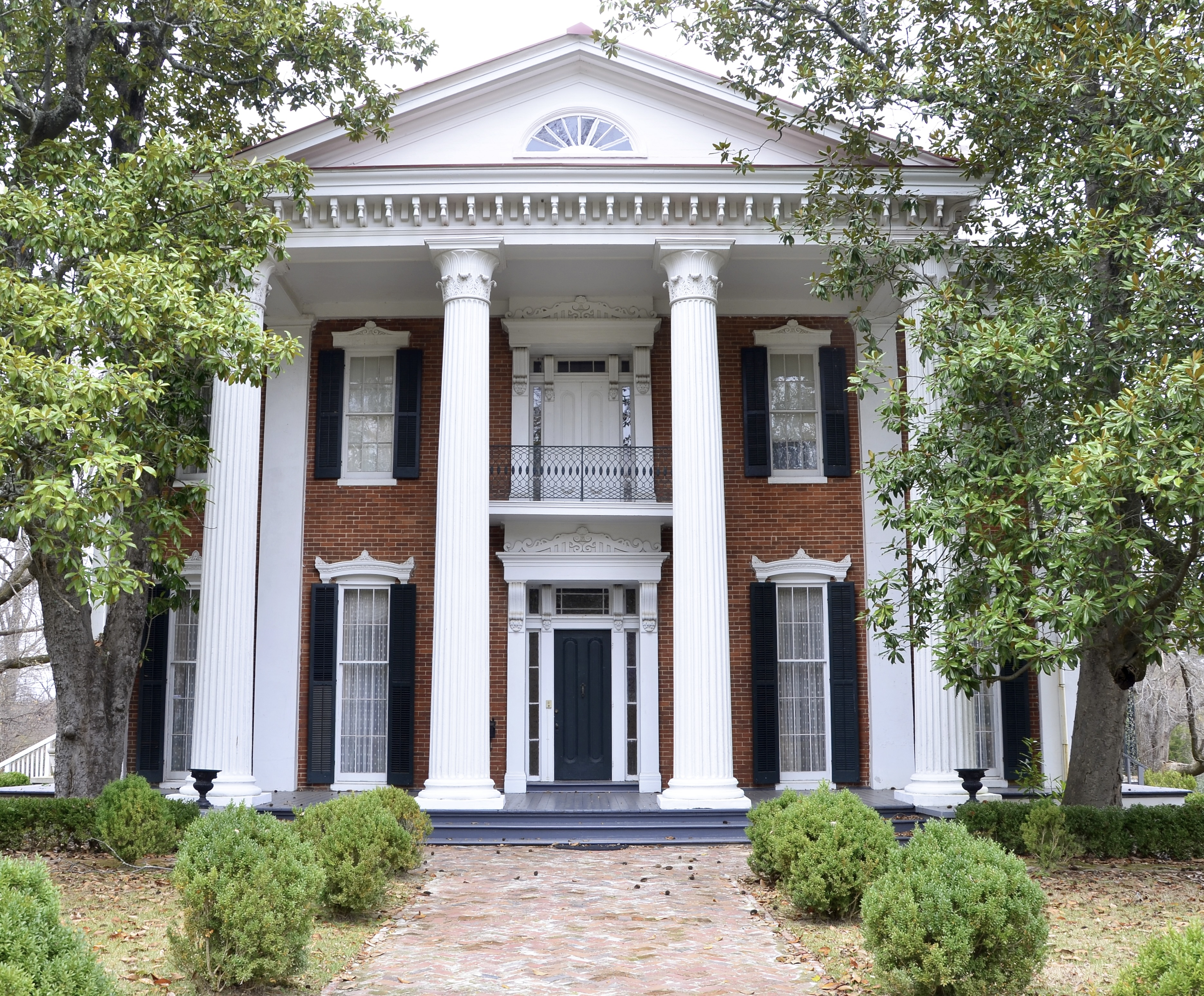
- The home in 2014

- Location within Mississippi Location within the United States
- Location: 330 Salem Avenue, Holly Springs, Mississippi, U.S.
- Coordinates: 34°46′20.02″N 89°26′27.8″W
- Built: 1858
- Architectural style: Greek Revival
- Part of: East Holly Springs Historic District (ID83000960)
- Added to NRHP: April 20, 1983

Oakleigh (a.k.a. Fant-Clapp House, Athenia, or West Home) is a historic mansion in Holly Springs, Mississippi, USA.

== Location ==
The house is located at 506 Salem Avenue in Holly Springs, a small town in Marshall County, Northern Mississippi.

== History ==
The two-storey mansion was built in 1858 for Judge Jeremiah W. Clapp. It was designed in the Greek Revival architectural style, with four Corinthian columns. The wrought-iron railings on the balconies were designed by the Jones, McElwain and Company Iron Foundry. Inside, the main hall is includes a large spiraling staircase. The dining-room, located behind the stairwell, is oval-shaped.

At the outset of the American Civil War of 1861–1865, the owner, Judge Clapp, was elected to the Congress of the Confederate States. As a result, he was in the crosshairs of the Union Army. When they ransacked the house, Clapp hid in the capital of one of the Corinthian columns. The house was then occupied by Union General Andrew Jackson Smith. It was later recaptured by Confederate General Earl Van Dorn in 1862.

In 1870, the mansion was acquired by former Confederate General Absolom M. West, who served in the Mississippi State Senate.

== Architectural significance ==
As a contributing property to the East Holly Springs Historic District, it has been listed on the National Register of Historic Places since April 20, 1983.
