= William King Museum of Art =

Museum in Abingdon, Virginia, United States

Coordinates: 36°42′34.5″N 81°59′13.2″W

The William King Museum of Art (WKMA) is a visual arts and cultural heritage museum located in Abingdon, Virginia. It is housed in a historic 1913 former school building. The William King Museum of Art features galleries showcasing art of the region and of the world, both contemporary and historic. The museum also features resident artist studios, an outdoor sculpture garden, and the VanGogh Educational Outreach Program. The William King Museum of Art is a partner of the Virginia Museum of Fine Arts and a member of the American Alliance of Museums, the Virginia Association of Museums, and the Southeastern Museums Conference.

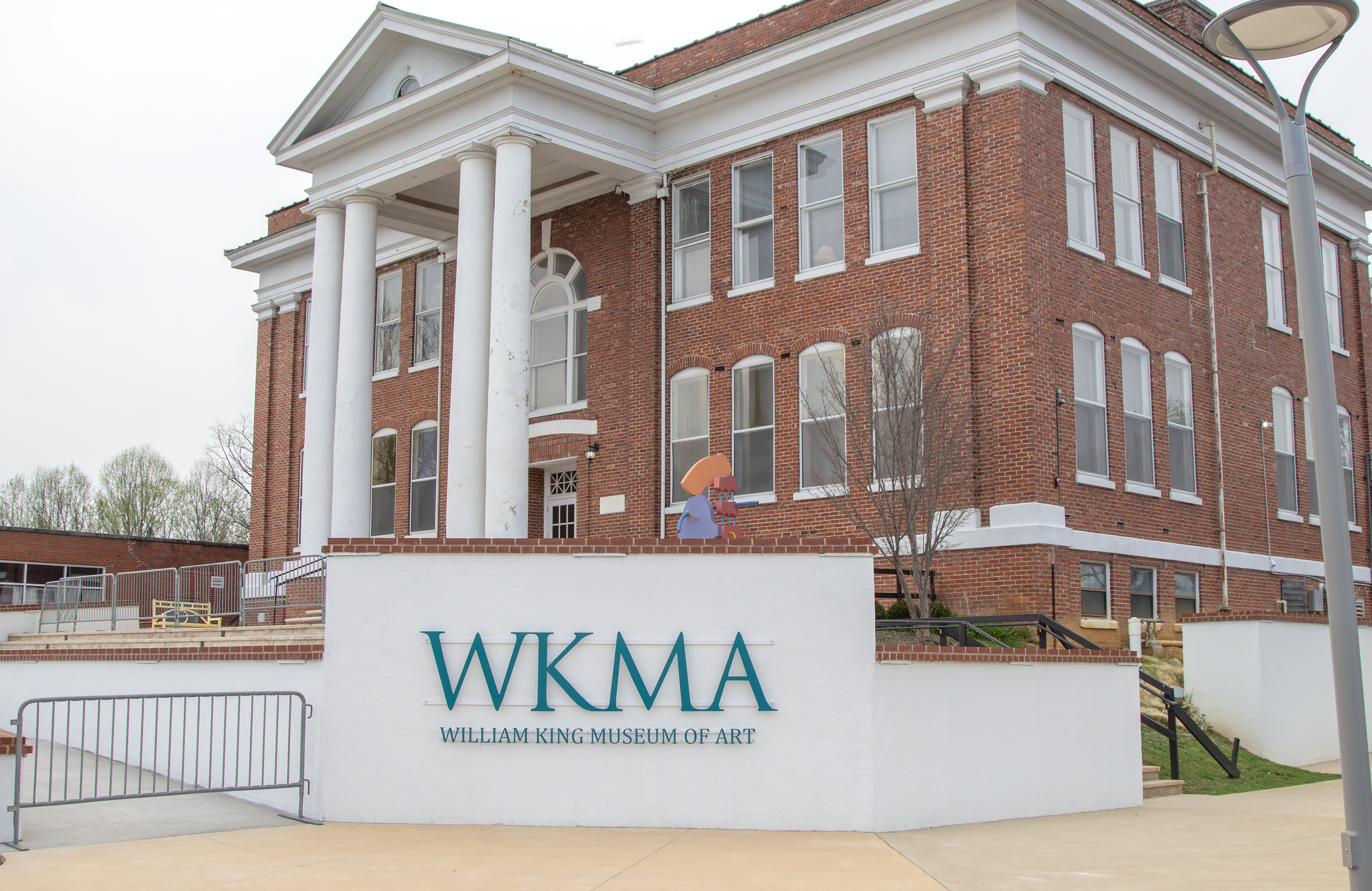

It was the site of the Abingdon Male Academy (1803–c. 1912).

== Overview ==
=== Research archives ===
WKMA is home to the Betsy K. White Cultural Heritage Research Archive, one of the most thorough documentations of the decorative arts legacy of Southwest Virginia and Northeast Tennessee in existence. The Cultural Heritage Archive is the research and data center for the Betsy K. White Cultural Heritage Project, a program of William King Museum. Since 1994, the project has documented and photographed over 200 objects made by hand in southwest Virginia and northeast Tennessee prior to 1940. The goal of the archive is to provide a lasting record of the region's contribution to American decorative arts, including furniture, textiles, pottery, metalwork, musical instruments, art and other forms of material culture.

=== Sculpture garden ===
The permanent collection of outdoor sculpture can be viewed on the museum's grounds. Several pieces are on view from the museum's outdoor sculpture competition, held biennially. In August 2016, the Museum unveiled 3 new sculptures as part of the Out in the Open: Outdoor Sculpture Competition and Exhibition.

=== Educational programs ===
The museum offers several educational programs, including:

- VanGogh Outreach, an outreach program for second grade public school classes that teaches about the visual arts using the study of China, Egypt and Native American Indians
- Heritage Express, an SOL-based program for fourth grade Virginia history students which focuses on the region's rich cultural heritage
- Tour Plus, hands-on art activities and a museum tour tailored to students in grades preK-12 focusing on a selected topic
- Art Lab & Digital Lab, equipped with painting, drawing, printmaking, and clay studios; a darkroom; and digital and 3D labs
