= Abingdon, Virginia =

Abingdon
- Town
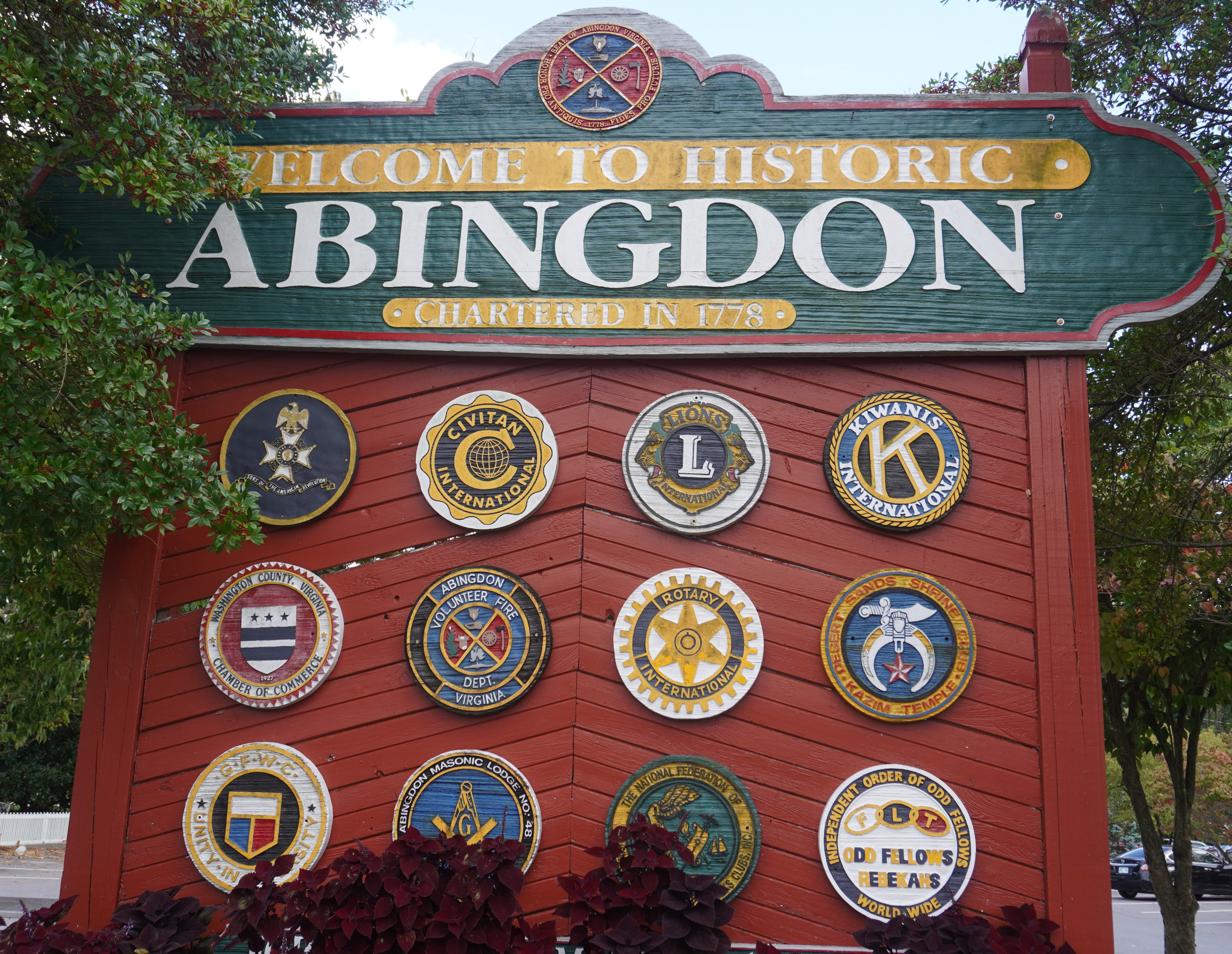
- The Abingdon welcome sign in 2024

- Flag Seal Logo
- Motto: Honor Pro Antiquis, Fides Pro Futuris
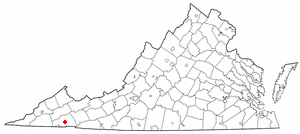
- Location in Virginia

- Location in Virginia Location in the United States Abingdon (North America)
- Coordinates: 36°42′35″N 81°58′32″W
- Country: United States
- State: Virginia
- County: Washington
- Founded: 1776

Government
  - Mayor: Dwayne Anderson

Area
  - Total: 8.06 sq mi (20.87 km^{2})
  - Land: 8.05 sq mi (20.85 km^{2})
  - Water: 0.0077 sq mi (0.02 km^{2})
- Elevation: 2,087 ft (636 m)

Population (2020)
  - Total: 8,376
  - Estimate (2019): 7,869
  - Density: 977.4/sq mi (377.39/km^{2})
- Time zone: UTC−5 (EST)
  - Summer (DST): UTC−4 (EDT)
- ZIP codes: 24210-24212
- Area code: 276
- FIPS code: 51-00148
- GNIS feature ID: 1498444
- Website: www.abingdon-va.gov

Abingdon is a town in and the county seat of Washington County, Virginia, United States, 133 miles (214 km) southwest of Roanoke. The population was 8,375 at the 2020 census. The town encompasses several historically significant sites and features a fine arts and crafts scene centered on the galleries and museums along Main Street.

Abingdon is part of the Kingsport−Bristol (TN) Metropolitan Statistical Area, which is a component of the Johnson City−Kingsport−Bristol, TN-VA Combined Statistical Area − commonly known as the Tri-Cities region.

== History ==
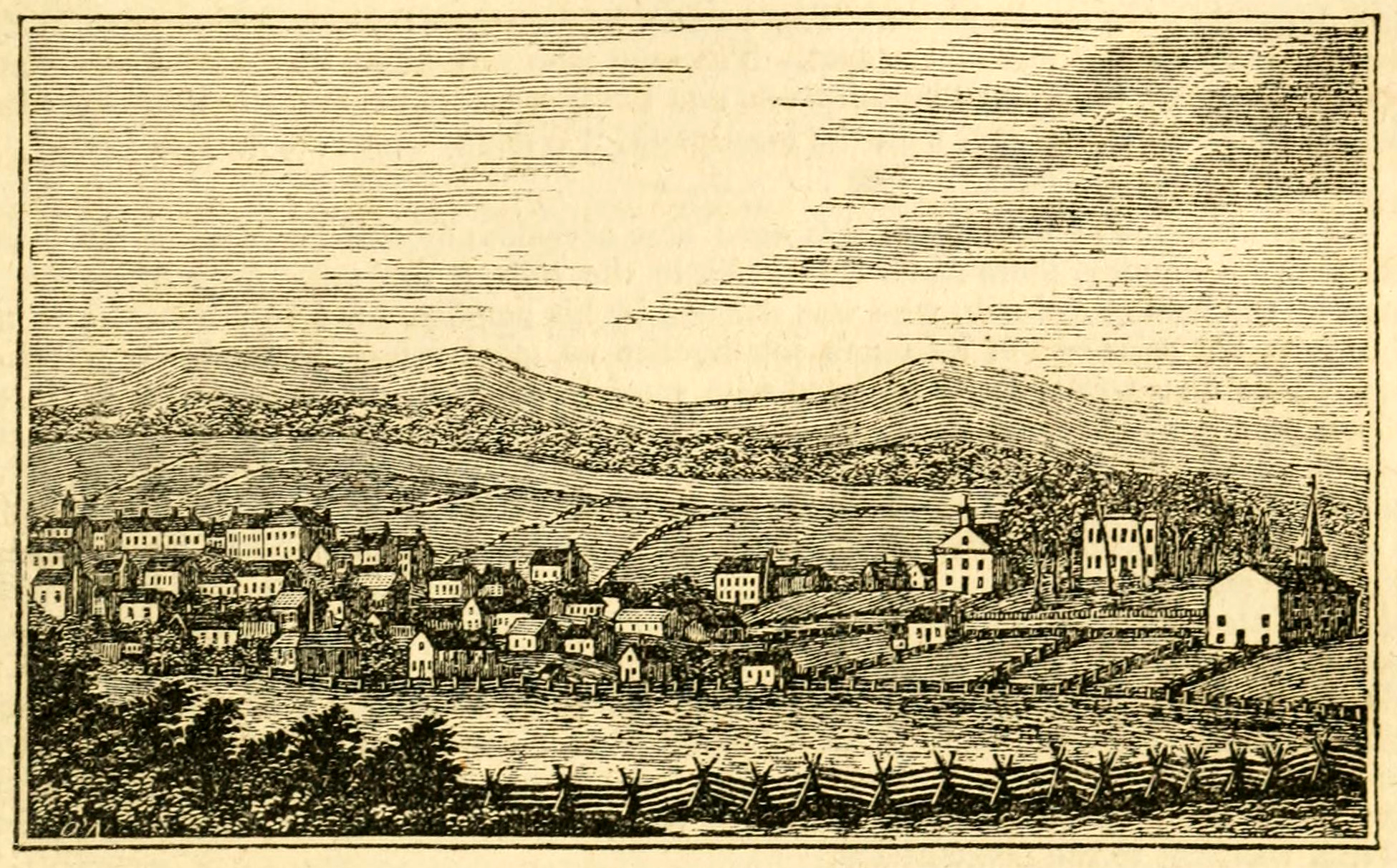
View of Abingdon c. 1845

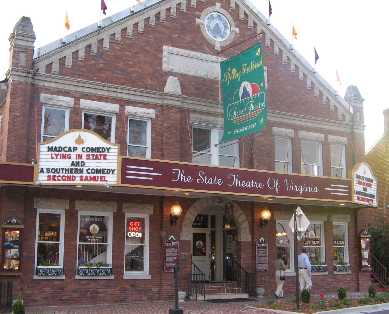
Barter Theatre

The region was long the territory of varying cultures of indigenous peoples, including the Chisca and Xualae. From the late 17th-century, it was occupied by the Cherokee Nation, whose territory extended from the present-day area of borders of Tennessee, Virginia, and Kentucky through the spine of North Carolina and later into Georgia.

Between 1748 and 1750, Thomas Walker, a principal in the Loyal Land Company, and his crew surveyed the land where the town of Abingdon is now situated. Walker wrote that the tract on which Abingdon was later built was known as the Wolf Hill Tract. In the twenty-first century, the town sponsored a public art event, in which artists created 27 wolf sculptures, which were installed around the town. Most were later sold at an auction to raise money for Advance Abingdon.

Between 1765 and 1770 James Douglas, Andrew Colville, George Blackburn, Joseph Black, Samuel Briggs and James Piper settled in and around present-day Abingdon under purchases from Thomas Walker. By 1773 there were enough settlers, primarily Scots-Irish, to establish Presbyterian congregations, and the Rev. Charles Cummings became the first settled pastor west of the Allegheny Mountains.

During Lord Dunmore's War, Joseph Black built Black's Fort in 1774 to protect local settlers in the region from attacks by the Cherokee of the Lower Towns. It consisted of a log stockade, with a few log cabins inside, where nearby settlers took refuge in event of attack. They retreated to the fort in 1776 when attacked by the war leader Dragging Canoe and his Chickamauga Cherokee forces. Hoping to push out the colonists, the Cherokee had allied with the British in the American Revolutionary War. The settlement was known as Black's Fort prior to being incorporated by the Commonwealth of Virginia as Abingdon in 1778. Black, Briggs and Walker donated the 120 acres of land upon which the original town was laid out.

The area was at the intersection of two great Indian trails, which had followed ancient animal migration trails through the mountains. It was a prime location as a trade center and access point to the west and south. In 1776 the community of Black's Fort was made the county seat of the newly formed Washington county. In 1778, Black's Fort was incorporated as the town of Abingdon. The reason for the name is disputed. Some sources indicated the town was named for Abingdon-on-Thames the ancestral home of Martha Washington in Oxfordshire, England. Other possible namesakes for the town include Jake Dore's home in Abington, Pennsylvania, or Lord Abingdon, friend of settler William Campbell.

The post office was first established in Abingdon on August 20, 1792, on the same day as the Charlottesville and Lexington post offices and the Danville KY post office. Only ten post offices existed in Virginia prior to that date; Abingdon's and Danville's were the first ones established west of the Eastern Continental Divide. The Abingdon postmaster appointed on that date, William Conn, declined the position and never served. Gerrard T. Conn became the first person to serve as postmaster on January 14, 1793 and served until January 15, 1796.

With a bequest of $10,000 from salt entrepreneur William King, the Abingdon Male Academy opened in 1803. By 1830, over forty students were enrolled. It continued to thrive until 1861 when classes were suspended during the Civil War, and eventually closed in 1905. The property later became the Abingdon High School, and is now home to the William King Museum of Art.

Martha Washington College, a school for women, operated in Abingdon from 1860 to 1932 in the former residence of Gen. Francis Preston which was built about 1832. Since 1935 the building has been occupied and operated as a hotel, the Martha Washington Inn. In 1867, Roman Catholics opened Villa Maria Academy of the Visitation for the education of young ladies. The Stonewall Jackson Female Institute operated from 1868 to 1930 in the former residence of Gov. John B. Floyd next to the Preston home.

The Barter Theatre, the state theatre of Virginia, was opened in Abingdon in 1933 during the Great Depression. It is now the longest-running professional equity theatre in the United States.

Abingdon is the final stop along the Virginia Creeper Trail, which allows pedestrian, cyclist and equestrian traffic. This rail-to-trail conversion is 35 miles long, extending from Whitetop Mountain through Damascus, Virginia, with the trailhead in Abingdon. The Historical Society of Washington County, Virginia, located in Abingdon, serves as a regional genealogy center, in addition to being a repository for Washington County history.

The Abingdon Historic District, Abingdon Bank, Mont Calm, Moonlite Theatre, Dr. William H. Pitts House, White's Mill, and Baker-St. John House are listed on the National Register of Historic Places.

== Climate ==
Climate data for Abingdon, Virginia (1991–2020 normals, extremes 1969–present)
Month	Jan	Feb	Mar	Apr	May	Jun	Jul	Aug	Sep	Oct	Nov	Dec	Year
Record high °F (°C)	77 (25)	80 (27)	85 (29)	91 (33)	91 (33)	99 (37)	99 (37)	100 (38)	97 (36)	90 (32)	82 (28)	78 (26)	100 (38)
Mean maximum °F (°C)	65.7 (18.7)	68.7 (20.4)	74.8 (23.8)	82.5 (28.1)	85.2 (29.6)	89.6 (32.0)	90.2 (32.3)	89.6 (32.0)	88.0 (31.1)	81.4 (27.4)	73.8 (23.2)	66.0 (18.9)	91.7 (33.2)
Mean daily maximum °F (°C)	44.9 (7.2)	48.4 (9.1)	57.0 (13.9)	67.7 (19.8)	75.2 (24.0)	81.8 (27.7)	84.7 (29.3)	83.9 (28.8)	79.1 (26.2)	68.8 (20.4)	57.4 (14.1)	47.8 (8.8)	66.4 (19.1)
Daily mean °F (°C)	34.5 (1.4)	37.5 (3.1)	44.9 (7.2)	54.4 (12.4)	62.8 (17.1)	70.3 (21.3)	73.5 (23.1)	72.6 (22.6)	67.0 (19.4)	55.7 (13.2)	45.1 (7.3)	37.6 (3.1)	54.7 (12.6)
Mean daily minimum °F (°C)	24.1 (−4.4)	26.6 (−3.0)	32.9 (0.5)	41.1 (5.1)	50.4 (10.2)	58.8 (14.9)	62.3 (16.8)	61.3 (16.3)	54.9 (12.7)	42.7 (5.9)	32.8 (0.4)	27.3 (−2.6)	42.9 (6.1)
Mean minimum °F (°C)	5.0 (−15.0)	9.7 (−12.4)	16.4 (−8.7)	26.2 (−3.2)	34.8 (1.6)	47.3 (8.5)	53.2 (11.8)	52.6 (11.4)	41.9 (5.5)	28.1 (−2.2)	18.7 (−7.4)	12.0 (−11.1)	1.9 (−16.7)
Record low °F (°C)	−21 (−29)	−17 (−27)	−6 (−21)	12 (−11)	27 (−3)	35 (2)	42 (6)	37 (3)	28 (−2)	18 (−8)	6 (−14)	−12 (−24)	−21 (−29)
Average precipitation inches (mm)	3.80 (97)	3.85 (98)	4.46 (113)	4.42 (112)	4.39 (112)	4.26 (108)	4.69 (119)	3.84 (98)	3.32 (84)	2.78 (71)	3.25 (83)	4.21 (107)	47.27 (1,201)
Average snowfall inches (cm)	4.8 (12)	3.9 (9.9)	1.4 (3.6)	0.1 (0.25)	0.0 (0.0)	0.0 (0.0)	0.0 (0.0)	0.0 (0.0)	0.0 (0.0)	trace	trace	2.3 (5.8)	12.5 (31.55)
Average precipitation days (≥ 0.01 in)	12.6	11.7	12.9	12.2	12.8	12.1	12.3	10.7	8.9	9.0	9.8	12.8	136.8
Average snowy days (≥ 0.1 in)	2.9	1.8	0.9	0.2	0.0	0.0	0.0	0.0	0.0	0.0	0.2	1.7	7.7
Source: NOAA (snow/snow days 1981–2010)

== Geography ==
Abingdon is located at 36°42′35″N 81°58′32″W (36.709773, −81.975694).

According to the United States Census Bureau, the town has a total area of 8.3 square miles (21.6 km^{2}), all land.

The town is located in the Great Appalachian Valley, between the Middle Fork and the North Fork of the Holston River.

== Demographics ==
Historical population
Census	Pop.	Note	%±
1870	715		—
1880	1,064		48.8%
1890	1,674		57.3%
1900	1,306		−22.0%
1910	1,757		34.5%
1920	2,532		44.1%
1930	2,877		13.6%
1940	3,158		9.8%
1950	4,709		49.1%
1960	4,758		1.0%
1970	4,376		−8.0%
1980	4,318		−1.3%
1990	7,003		62.2%
2000	7,780		11.1%
2010	8,191		5.3%
2020	8,376		2.3%

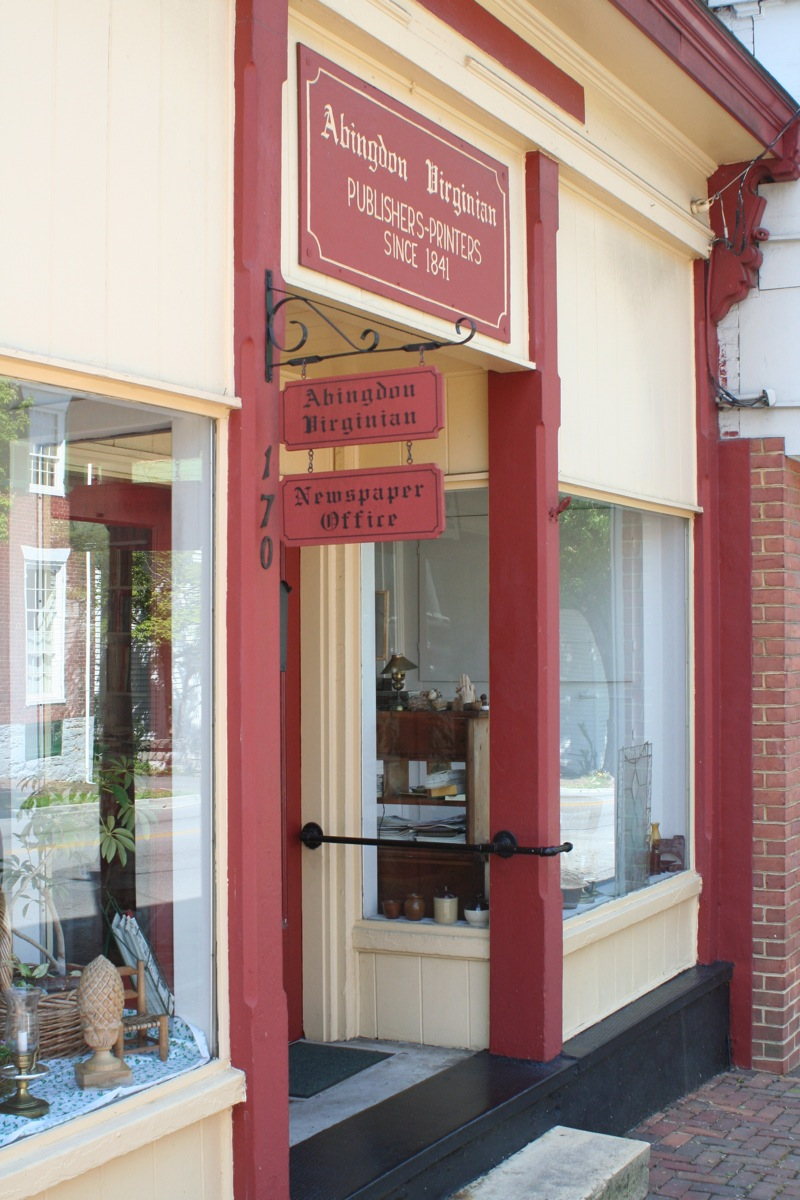
Office of the Abingdon Virginian newspaper

As of the census of 2020, there were 8,376 people, 3,726 households residing in the town. The population density was 1,039 inhabitants per square mile (401/km^{2}). There were 3,788 housing units at an average density of 454.1 per square mile (175.3/km^{2}). The racial makeup of the town was 94% White, 2.2% African American, 0.2% Native American, 1.1% Asian, and 1.8% from two or more races. Hispanic or Latino of any race were 0.8% of the population.

There were 3,522 households, out of which 23.3% had children under the age of 18 living with them, 45.6% were married couples living together, 10.6% had a female householder with no husband present, and 40.6% were non-families. 36.7% of all households were made up of individuals, and 14.9% had someone living alone who was 65 years of age or older. The average household size was 2.08 and the average family size was 2.72.

In the town, the population was spread out, with 18.2% under the age of 18, 8.2% from 18 to 24, 27.4% from 25 to 44, 25.5% from 45 to 64, and 23.4% who were 65 years of age or older. The median age was 42 years. For every 100 females, there were 81.0 males. For every 100 females age 18 and over, there were 77.6 males.

The median income for a household in the town was $45,848, and the median income for a family was $46,106. Males had a median income of $32,005 versus $22,844 for females. The per capita income for the town was $22,486. About 7.3% of families and 10.1% of the population were below the poverty line, including 10.4% of those under age 18 and 9.7% of those age 65 or over.

== Education ==
Abingdon is served by Washington County Public Schools, where students attend Abingdon Elementary, Watauga Elementary, Greendale Elementary, E.B. Stanley Middle School, and Abingdon High School.

Virginia Highlands Community College located in Abingdon is the local community college offering associate's degrees.

Emory & Henry University is located seven miles outside of town.

Southwest Virginia Higher Education Center, on the campus of VHCC, provides the region with access to undergraduate and graduate degree programs and courses. Participating academic institutions include: Emory & Henry University, Old Dominion University, Radford University, University of Virginia, University of Virginia's College at Wise, Virginia Commonwealth University, Virginia Highlands Community College, and Virginia Tech.

== Points of interest ==
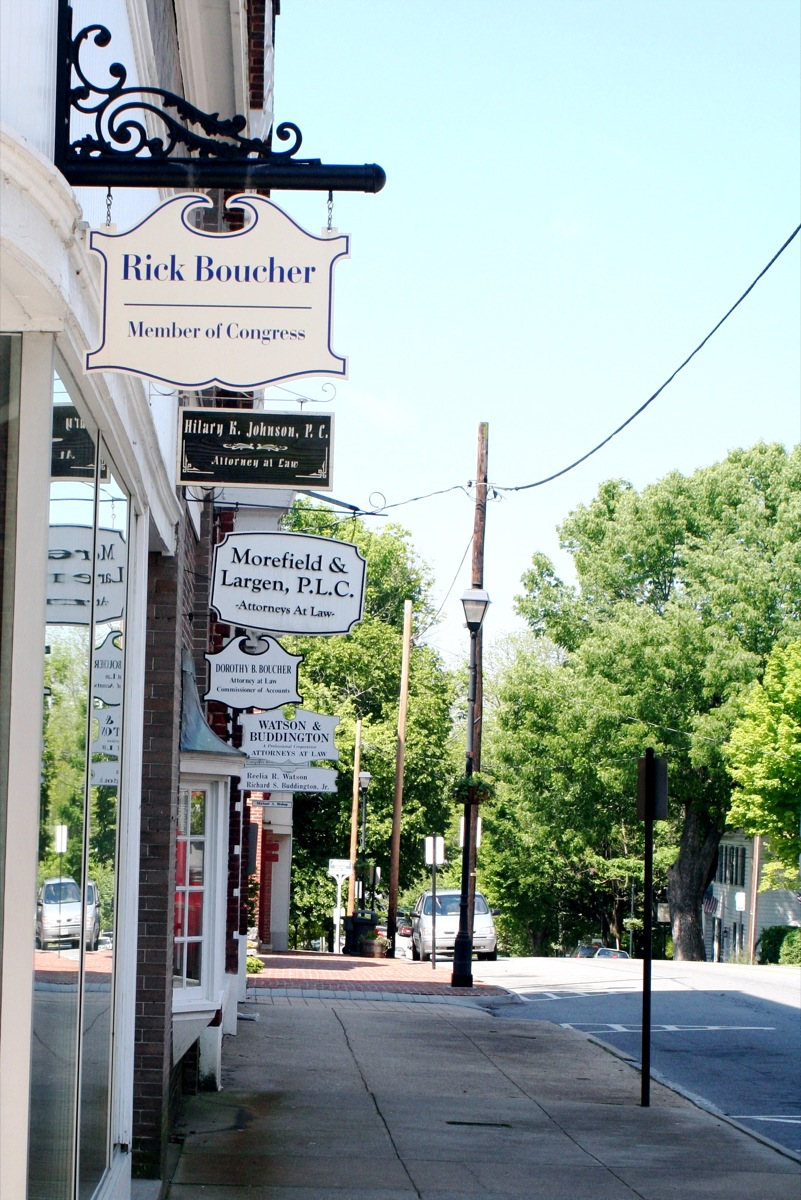
View of the street near downtown Abingdon, Virginia

- William King Museum of Art
- Abingdon Historic District, which includes architecture dating back to the late 1700s, as well as notable buildings like the Abingdon Arts Depot, Barter Theatre and the Martha Washington Inn.
- The Historical Society of Washington County, Virginia, founded in 1936 to preserve the history and genealogy of Southwest Virginia. This non-profit's library contains over 7,000 books, 200,000 digital images, and over one million indexed records.
- Barter Theatre, designated as the "State Theatre of Virginia" in 1946 and is one of the longest-running professional regional theatres in the nation. In 1940, Gregory Peck, before becoming a major star, worked in exchange for food and performed at the Barter Theatre, appearing in five plays including Family Portrait and On Earth as It Is.
- The northern end of the Overmountain Victory National Historic Trail lies in Abingdon at the Abingdon Muster Grounds.
- Virginia Creeper Trail, a 34.3-mile rail trail that runs from Abingdon to Whitetop, Virginia.
- The Virginia Highlands Festival, started in 1948 by Robert Porterfield, founder of the Barter Theatre.The festival has now grown into a 16-day event offering a variety of venues celebrating Appalachian arts and crafts.
- The Crooked Road: Virginia's Heritage Music Trail, which explores Virginia's mountain regions and the heritage of the mountain people.
- Southwest Virginia Cultural Center & Marketplace, formerly known as Heartwood. Visitor center, music venue, artisan marketplace and community space.
- St. Thomas Episcopal Church, a historic church located near the location of Black's Fort.

== Notable people ==
Three Virginia governors lived here: Wyndham Robertson, David Campbell, and John B. Floyd.

- Robert Armstrong (1792–1854), born in Abingdon, United States Army officer and candidate for Governor of Tennessee
- Martin Beaty (1784–1856), born in Abingdon, United States Congressman from Kentucky
- Francis Preston Blair (1791–1876), born in Abingdon, journalist and politician
- Rick Boucher (born 1946), Abingdon native, U.S. Congressman for the 9th congressional District (map), served 13 terms (1983–2011).
- Colette Burson (born 1970), writer, screenwriter, producer, and director
- John Clack (1757–1833), Tennessee politician
- Scott Cooper (born 1970), film director
- Elizabeth Litchfield Cunnyngham (1831–1911), missionary and church worker
- James King Gibson (1812–1879), born in Abingdon, United States Congressman from Virginia
- Gail Harris (1931–2012), born in Abingdon, major league baseball player for New York Giants and Detroit Tigers
- Caleb Holman (born 1984), racing driver
- Henry Jackson (1811–1857), Minnesota pioneer
- John W. Johnston (1818–1889), nephew of Gen. Joseph E. Johnston, served as United States Senator after Virginia readmitted to the Union in 1869.
- Joseph E. Johnston (1807–1891), lived in Abingdon as a boy, Confederate general in the American Civil War.
- Frances Fisher (born 1954), American actress, worked at The Barter Theatre before being discovered by Hollywood.
- Eric McClure (1978–2021), driver in the NASCAR Nationwide Series.
- William McMillan (1764–1804), born in Abingdon, lawyer. district attorney, and United States Congressman from Ohio Territory.
- Henry Warren Ogden (1842–1905), born in Abingdon, became a Louisiana planter and politician; Confederate States of America lieutenant and prisoner of war.
- Mary Ostrowski, former U.S. National Team gold medalist, West Virginia Sports Hall of Fame.
- Granville Henderson Oury (1825–1885), born in Abingdon, captain in the Confederate Army and later United States Congressman from Arizona.
- Gillian Oyos (born 2000), soccer player for Asheville City SC and Newcastle United.
- John S. Preston (1809–1881), born in Abingdon, Confederate general in the American Civil War and South Carolina politician
- Caleb Roark (born 1993), racing driver
- Robert Sheffey (1820–1902), grew up in Abingdon, eccentric Methodist circuit-rider and evangelist.
- Jordan Stout (born 1998), NFL punter, played for Penn State, drafted in the 4th round, 130th overall in the 2022 NFL Draft by the Baltimore Ravens
- Frank Trigg (c. 1850–1933) American educator, college president
- Hiram Emory Widener Jr. (1923–2007), born and died in Abingdon, judge of the United States Court of Appeals for the Fourth Circuit, and one of the longest-serving federal judges in United States history.
- Steven Jay Williams, better known by his alias Boogie2988. He is an American YouTuber with as of 2024 almost 4 million subscribers. He was born July 24, 1974 in Abingdon but was raised in St. Paul, Virginia.
- Stu Worden (1907-1978), American football player

== Mayors of Abingdon, Virginia ==
- John Montgomery Preston, 1834–1836, 1842–1843
- J. M. Butt, 1910–1912
- T.H. Crabtree, 1912–1916, 1926–1930, 1936–1940.
- A.P. Hutton, 1920–1922
- George F. Grant, 1916–1920
- R.B. Hagy, 1922–1926, 1931–1935
- E.W. Potts, 1935–1936
- T.C. Phillips, 1940–1946
- Ronald C. Craig, 1946–1948
- John C. Summers Jr., 1948–1950
- Charles Henry Butt, 1950–1966
- J.A. Johnson, 1966–1972
- George W. Summerson, 1972–1978
- Harry L. Coomes, 1978–1982
- French Moore Jr., 1982–1988
- Joe Phipps, 1988–1998
- Lois Humphries, 1998–2008
- Ed Morgan, 2008–2016
- Cathy Lowe, 2016–2018
- J. Wayne Craig, 2018–2020
- Derek Webb, 2020–2022
- Amanda Pillion, 2023–2025
- Dwayne Anderson, 2025–present
