= Southwest District (VHSL) =

High School Athletic District

- Location: Virginia
- Country: USA
- Website: Official website

The Southwest District is a high school athletic conference of the Virginia High School League that includes schools from southwestern Virginia, United States. The Southwest District was established in the former AA Region IV.

== History ==
The AA Highlands District dissolved in 2007, with Abingdon and Marion joining the Southwest District. VHSL schools are placed into groups depending on size (formerly A, AA, and AAA), then each group was divided into its own regions, then districts. The system changed in 2013 to prevent the formation of very large regions for smaller schools, which are often rural. The AA Southwest District had several changes for the 2013–2014 school year during the overall VHSL realignment. Carroll County, a member of the new Group 4A, moved to the AA River Ridge District. Virginia High School and Lebanon High School joined from the dissolved A Clinch Mountain District. Graham High School recently joined the district after 6 years with the A Mountain Empire District due to the new alignment plan mapped out by the VHSL.

Abingdon is a member of the new Group 3A while the other schools are members of the new Group 2A. Abingdon left the Southwest District in the 2017 - 2018 School Year for the new Mountain 7 District. These schools are part of the new region system after conferences fell by the wayside. Region 2D is the new classification.

In the 2021-2022 school year, Lebanon briefly moved down to Region 1D and into the Hogoheegee district before rejoining the Southwest District and Region 2D in the 2023-2024 school year.

== Member schools ==
Six schools are members of the conference as of 2024:

School	Location	Mascot	Colors	2022-23 9–12 enrollment
Graham High School	Bluefield	G-Men		520
Lebanon High School	Lebanon	Pioneers		606
Marion Senior High School	Marion	Scarlet Hurricanes		635
Richlands High School	Cedar Bluff	Blue Tornado		721
Tazewell High School	Tazewell	Bulldogs		530
Virginia High School	Bristol	Bearcats		670
