= Mike Compton (American football) =

American football player and coach (born 1970)

No. 74, 77
- Position: Guard

Personal information
- Born: September 18, 1970 (age 56); Richlands, Virginia, U.S.
- Listed height: 6 ft 7 in (2.01 m)
- Listed weight: 307 lb (139 kg)

Career information
- High school: Richlands
- College: West Virginia
- NFL draft: 1993: 3rd round, 68th overall pick

Career history

Playing
- Detroit Lions (1993–2000); New England Patriots (2001–2003); Jacksonville Jaguars (2004)

Coaching
- Tazewell HS (VA) (2006–2007) Assistant coach; Patrick Henry HS (VA) (2008–2011) Head coach; Fairmont State (2011–2012) Offensive line coach; Bluefield (2013–2014) Offensive line coach; Concord (2015) Offensive line coach; Virginia–Wise (2016–2023) Offensive line coach; Emory & Henry (2024-) Offensive line coach

Awards and highlights
- 2× Super Bowl champion (XXXVI, XXXVIII); Consensus All-American (1992); First-team All-Big East (1991, 1992); West Virginia University Sports Hall of Fame

Career NFL statistics
- Games played: 151
- Games started: 119
- Fumble recoveries: 2
- Stats at Pro Football Reference

Michael Eugene Compton (born September 18, 1970) is an American former professional football player who was a guard for 12 seasons in the National Football League (NFL). Compton played college football for the West Virginia Mountaineers, earning consensus All-American honors as a center in 1992. He played professionally for the Detroit Lions, New England Patriots and Jacksonville Jaguars of the NFL, and started in Super Bowl XXXVI for the Patriots.

== Early life ==
Compton was born in Richlands, Virginia. He graduated from Richlands High School, where he played high school football, baseball and wrestled for the Richlands Blue Tornado.

== College career ==
Compton attended West Virginia University, and he played for the West Virginia Mountaineers football team from 1989 to 1992. He began his college career at West Virginia in 1989 as a redshirt freshman. Compton was backup to senior center Jeff Price that season. In 1990, Compton's sophomore season, he became the starter at the center position. His game experience from his redshirt freshman year was key in his starting success. In 1991, as a junior, Compton was an all-Big East selection.

In 1992, his senior season, Compton earned consensus All-American honors. He was a finalist for the Lombardi Award, a first-team all-Big East selection, a selection to the CFA Scholar-Athlete Team, and a first-team Academic All-American.

In 2005, Compton was inducted into West Virginia University's Sports Hall of Fame.

== Professional career ==
Pre-draft measurables
Height	Weight	Arm length	Hand span	40-yard dash	10-yard split	20-yard split	20-yard shuttle	Vertical jump	Broad jump	Bench press
6 ft 6 1/2 in (1.99 m)	297 lb (135 kg)	34 in (0.86 m)	10 1/8 in (0.26 m)	5.35 s	1.85 s	3.06 s	4.77 s	21.5 in (0.55 m)	8 ft 4 in (2.54 m)	16 reps
All values from NFL Combine

Compton was selected in the third round (68th pick overall) of the 1993 NFL draft by the Detroit Lions. He played for the Lions from 1993 to 2000. He was the starter on the offensive line, blocking for Barry Sanders during his record-setting rushing seasons. During his time with the Lions, Compton also served as the team's long snapper for field goal and point after attempts. Linebacker Allen Aldridge served as the long snapper for punt coverage.

During his NFL career, Compton displayed versatility along the offensive line, often playing multiple positions in any given season, including center, left tackle, and left guard.

In 2001, Compton joined the New England Patriots squad. In his three seasons with the Patriots, Compton earned two Super Bowl rings. In 2004, Compton ended his career with the Jacksonville Jaguars.

== Coaching career ==
Compton was an assistant coach at Tazewell High School in Tazewell, Virginia during the 2006 and 2007 seasons. In 2008, he was named head football coach at Patrick Henry High School in Glade Spring, Virginia.

In 2011, Compton began his college football coaching career as offensive line coach for Bluefield College. In 2013, he was the offensive line coach at Fairmont State University. In 2015, Compton was the offensive line coach at Concord University.

In 2016, Compton was hire as the offensive line coach at University of Virginia's College at Wise.

== Personal life ==
Compton and his family reside in Richlands, Virginia. He is married to LeTonya. Compton has three children, Jessica, Josh, and Sarah. He became a grandfather for the first time in November 2019.
