= Ryan Cowden =

American football player (born 1979)

New England Patriots
- Title: Vice president of player personnel

Personal information
- Born: 1979 (age 46–47)

Career information
- Position: Safety
- High school: Lebanon (VA)
- College: Wofford

Career history
- Carolina Panthers (2000-2015); Scouting assistant (2000); Area scout (2001-2007); National scout (2008-2012); National scout/senior college scout (2012-2013); Assistant director of college scouting (2014-2015); Tennessee Titans (2016–2022); Director of player personnel (2016-2017); Vice president of player personnel (2018-2022); Interim general manager (2022); New York Giants (2023–2024) Executive advisor to the general manager; New England Patriots (2025–present) Vice president of player personnel
- Executive profile at Pro Football Reference

Ryan Cowden (born 1979) is an American football executive and former player who is currently the vice president of player personnel for the New England Patriots of the National Football League (NFL). He played college football at Wofford and has previously served with the Carolina Panthers and Tennessee Titans, including as the Titans' interim general manager in 2022.

== Early life and education ==
Cowden attended Lebanon High School in Virginia where he was one of the state's top multi-sport athletes, playing football as a quarterback, baseball as an outfielder, basketball as a point guard and track and field. He was a three-year starter in football and compiled an overall record of 30–6, leading them to the Region C, Division 2 championship in 1994 where they lost 34–33, in what was considered one of the greatest games in Southwest Virginia history.

Cowden later attended Wofford College and played strong safety on their football team. As a senior in 1999, he recorded a total of 59 tackles, placing third on the team, and was the holder for kicks, throwing in that position a 29-yard touchdown on a fake field goal. He received a degree in finance when he graduated.

== Executive career ==
In 2000, after graduating from Wofford, Cowden was hired by the Carolina Panthers as a scouting assistant. He had worked at a fireworks store on Asheville Highway before receiving the job with Carolina. He became a scout for the southeast area in 2001, and served in the position through 2007. Cowden served as a national scout from 2008 to 2012 and also added the position of senior college scout in 2012, which he served as until being promoted to assistant director of college scouting in 2014.

Cowden was hired by the Tennessee Titans as director of player personnel in 2016. He received a promotion in 2018 to vice president of player personnel. In that position, he oversees the entire scouting department and assists with collegiate scouting, as well as helping prepare the team for the NFL draft. After Jon Robinson was fired as general manager of the Titans in December 2022, Cowden was named interim replacement.

On May 22, 2023, Cowden was hired by the New York Giants as executive advisor to the general manager. On January 13, 2025, the Giants let Cowden out of his contract to join the New England Patriots as a front office advisor.

Cowden has been previously interviewed for the general manager position by the Kansas City Chiefs (in 2017), the Carolina Panthers (in 2018), the Washington Commanders (then known as the Washington Football Team, in 2021), the New York Giants (in 2022), and the Pittsburgh Steelers (in 2022).
