= Tazewell County Public Schools =

School district in Virginia, United States

Tazewell County Public Schools is the school district that administers all public schools in Tazewell County, Virginia, United States. The school system is managed by the School Board, based in Tazewell, Virginia, and the Division Superintendent is Dr. Christopher Stacy. The system comprises fourteen schools, thirteen of which are fully accredited by the Southern Association of Colleges and Schools. As of the 2007–2008 school year, there were 6,911 students enrolled in the school system.

== Schools ==
=== Elementary schools ===
- Abbs Valley- Boissevain Elementary School, Boissevain
- Cedar Bluff Elementary School, Cedar Bluff
- Dudley Primary School, Bluefield
- Graham Intermediate School, Bluefield
- Tazewell Intermediate School, North Tazewell
- Richlands Elementary School, Richlands
- Tazewell Primary School, Tazewell

=== Middle schools ===
- Graham Middle School, Bluefield
- Richlands Middle School, Richlands
- Tazewell Middle School, Tazewell

=== High schools ===
- Graham High School, Bluefield
- Richlands High School, Richlands
- Tazewell High School, Tazewell

=== Specialty schools ===
- Tazewell County Career and Technical Center
