= Tazewell High School =

Public high school in Virginia, US

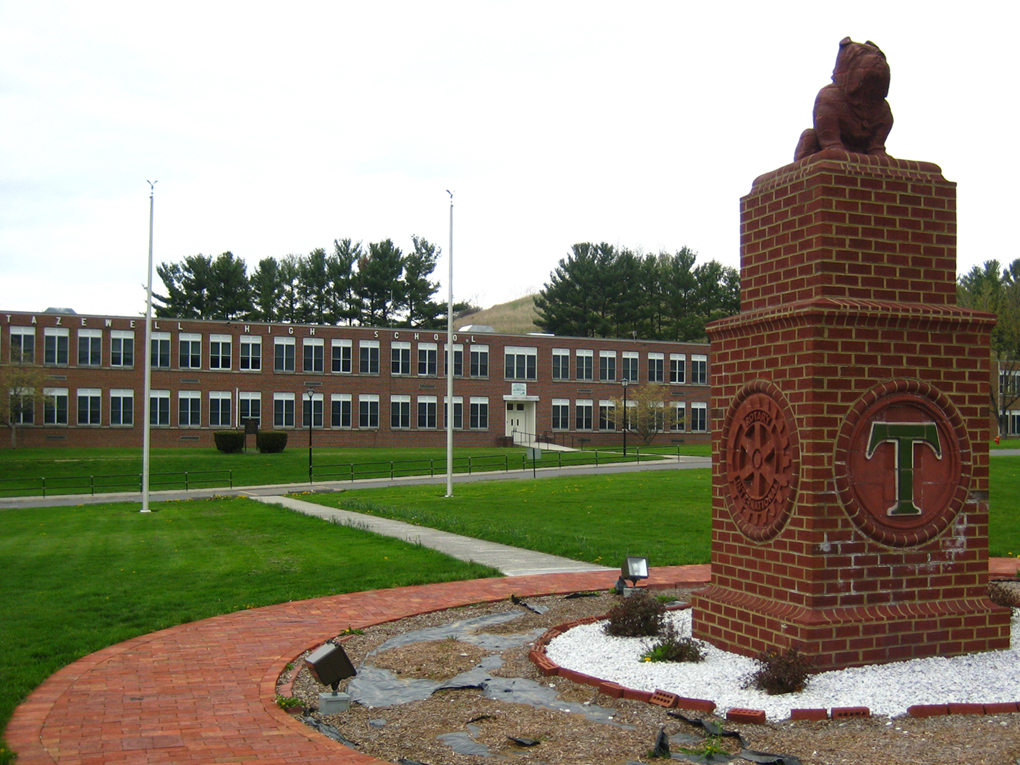

Location
- 627 Fincastle Road; Tazewell, Virginia 24651; United States; 37°7′29.8″N 81°30′18.4″W

Information
- School type: Public high school
- Locale: Town, Distant
- School district: Tazewell County Public Schools
- NCES District ID: 5103810
- Superintendent: Christopher Stacy
- NCES School ID: 510381001668
- Principal: Nathan Cline
- Teaching staff: 44.25 (on an FTE basis)
- Grades: 9–12
- Enrollment: 509 (2024–25)
- Student to teacher ratio: 11.50
- Language: English
- Colors: Kelly Green and White
- Mascot: Bulldog
- Rival Schools: Graham High School, Richlands High School (Virginia)
- Athletic Conference: Southwest District; Region IV
- Website: Official Site

Tazewell High School (THS) is a public secondary school in Tazewell, Virginia, United States. It is part of Tazewell County Public Schools and is located on Fincastle Road. As of the 2024–2025 school year, enrollment was about 509 students.

== History ==
Prior to the current location, Tazewell High School was located in three other areas: the current locations of the Tazewell County Courthouse, the Tazewell branch of the Tazewell County Library, and the Tazewell County Administration Building.

The current location was built in 1954.

The Virginia Constitution of 1870, also known as the Underwood Constitution, establishes universal, free public education in the Commonwealth. Tazewell High School was established in October 1872.

In 1909 the old bank building which housed Tazewell High School was torn down to make way for a new school structure. This new building was first occupied on August 19, 1909, and included both elementary and high school students.

== Notable alumni ==
- Kathryn Harrold, actress
- Francis A. Hopkins, US representative from Kentucky
- Emilee Hackney, author
- Billy Wagner, 1990 MLB baseball player and member of the National Baseball Hall of Fame
- George Grimes, NFL Football player, 1948 Detroit Lions
