= Emilee Hackney =

American writer

- Born: 1996 or 1997 (age 29–30); Tazewell County, Virginia
- Education: Harvard University (AB)
- Spouse: Charles Lacy
- Children: 1
- Writing career
- Notable work: All That's Unseen

Emilee Hackney is an American writer. Her 2026 debut memoir is All That's Unseen: An Appalachian Memoir.

== Early life and education ==
Hackney was raised in Tazewell, Virginia. Her mother was a kindergarten teacher and her father worked for the West Virginia State Police and as an administrator for a coal mine.

After graduating from Tazewell High School as valedictorian, Hackney attended Southwest Virginia Community College before transferring to Harvard University, where she obtained a bachelor's degree in English in 2020. Her senior thesis later became the basis for her debut book All That's Unseen. After graduating from Harvard, Hackney briefly studied for a Master of Fine Arts degree at Vanderbilt University before leaving the program after the death of her father.

== All That's Unseen ==
=== Summary ===
All That's Unseen: An Appalachian Memoir details Hackney's life growing up in Tazewell, Virginia in the Appalachia region of the United States as an 8th generation Appalachian, including the socially conservative customs and traditions of the Pentecostal Church. She then experienced culture shock and social isolation after moving to Cambridge, Massachusetts to study at Harvard.

=== Development ===
While at Harvard, Michael Pollan advised Hackney's senior thesis and referred her to a literary agent. The thesis was later expanded into the memoir and released in 2026. In an interview about her own memoir, Hackney said that “I was disappointed that Hillbilly Elegy, which is perhaps the most well-known Appalachian memoir, was written by someone who is arguably not even Appalachian, seems to actively disdain Appalachia and asserts that his own negative experiences indicate the entire Appalachian culture is ‘in crisis.’”

=== Critical reception ===
Some commentators have compared the memoir to American Vice President JD Vance's memoir (Hillbilly Elegy) about his own childhood in the Appalachian region of Ohio. Reviewing the memoir in The New York Times, Jamie Quatro stated that Hackney's memoir was a much more nuanced and sophisticated account of life in Appalachia than Vance's book. Quatro commended Hackney's memoir for portraying complex characters, rather than the one-dimensional valiant hard workers and lazy welfare-state recipients in Vance's book. Quatro concluded: "When it comes to writing about rural Appalachia, Hackney’s memoir proves that an elegy is the last thing we need."

== Personal life ==
Hackney met her husband, Charles Lacy, while hiking the Appalachian Trail. The couple have a daughter. They live in Charlottesville, Virginia, where Hackney works for the University of Virginia.
