= Marion Senior High School (Virginia) =

Location
- 848 Stage Street; Marion, Virginia 24354; United States
- Coordinates: 36°50′20.3″N 81°30′18.3″W

Information
- School type: Public, High school
- School district: Smyth County School Division
- Superintendent: Dennis G. Carter
- Principal: Dr. Kelli Hughes
- Teaching staff: 49.78 (FTE) (2018–19)
- Grades: 9–12
- Enrollment: 635 (2018–19)
- Student to teacher ratio: 12.76:1 (2018–19)
- Colors: Scarlet & White
- Athletics conference: Southwest District; Region IV
- Mascot: MSHS Goat
- Website: mshs.scsb.org

Marion Senior High School is a public high school located in Marion, Virginia. It is part of the Smyth County Public Schools and its athletics compete in the AA Southwest District in Region IV.

== Notable alumni ==
- Larry Bales, former football and baseball college coach
- Edd Houck, former Virginia State Senator
