= Emory & Henry University =

Liberal arts college in Emory, Virginia, US

- Seal of Emory and Henry College
- Former names: Emory & Henry College (1836–2024)
- Motto: Macte Virtute (Latin)
- Motto in English: Increase in Excellence
- Type: Private university
- Established: 1836; 190 years ago
- Accreditation: SACSCOC
- Religious affiliation: United Methodist Church
- Endowment: $105 million (mid-2025)
- President: Louise Fincher
- Provost: Michael Puglisi
- Faculty: 98 full-time and 88 part-time (fall 2023)
- Students: 1,364 (fall 2023)
- Undergraduates: 1,107 (fall 2023)
- Postgraduates: 257 (fall 2023)
- Location: Emory, Virginia, U.S. 36°46′23″N 81°49′55″W
- Campus: Rural
- Colors: Blue & gold
- Nickname: Wasps
- Sporting affiliations: NCAA Division II; South Atlantic Conference
- Mascot: Wasp
- Website: emoryhenry.edu
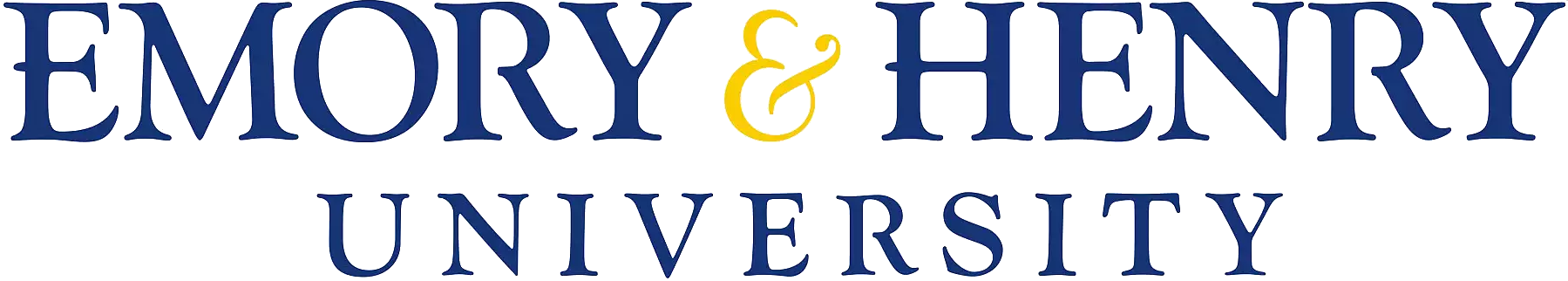
- Emory & Henry University
- U.S. National Register of Historic Places
- U.S. Historic district
- Virginia Landmarks Register
- Location within Virginia Location within the United States
- Nearest city: Emory, Virginia
- Built: 1845
- Architectural style: Colonial Revival, other, Georgian Revival
- NRHP reference No.: 85003695
- VLR No.: 095-0098

Significant dates
- Added to NRHP: January 30, 1989
- Designated VLR: January 18, 1983

Emory & Henry University (E&H or EHU) is a private university in Emory, Virginia, United States. The campus lies on 335 acres (1.36 km^{2}) of Washington County, which is part of the Appalachian highlands of Southwest Virginia. Founded in 1836, EHU is the oldest institution of higher learning in Southwest Virginia. The university is accredited by the Southern Association of Colleges and Schools Commission on Colleges.

== History ==
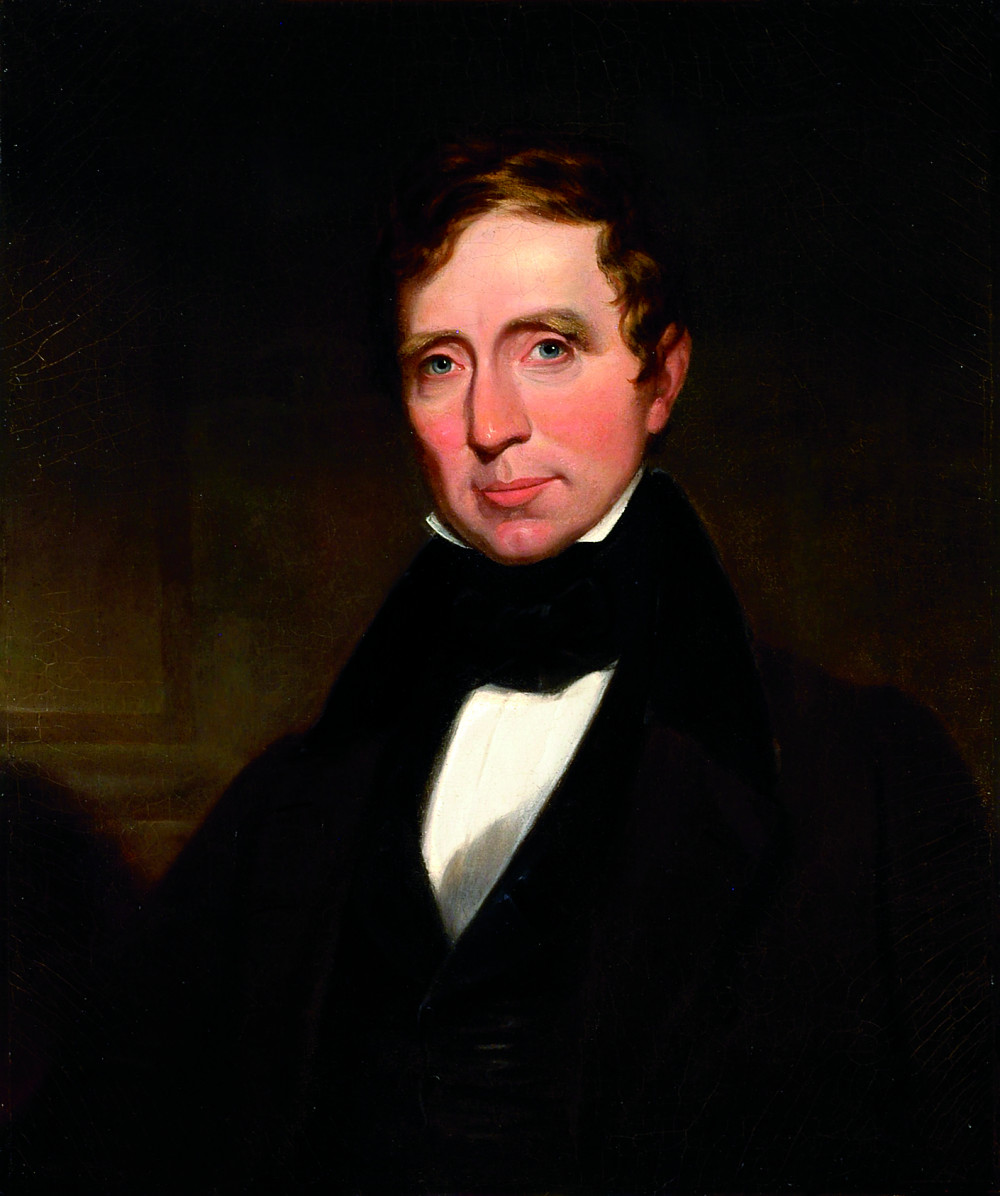
Methodist bishop John Emory by American painter George Esten Cooke. The painting is dated 1838 and is housed at Emory & Henry College.

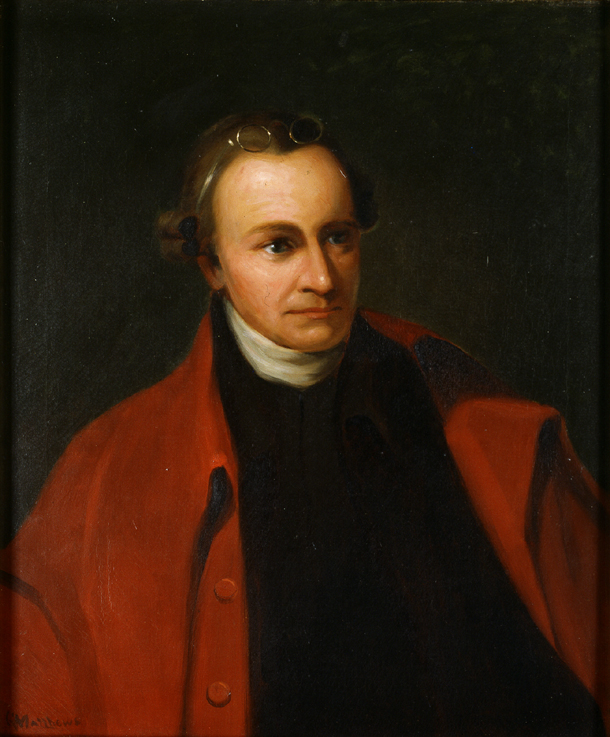
American patriot and Virginia Governor Patrick Henry, painted by George B. Matthews, c.1891

Emory & Henry University is named after John Emory, a renowned Methodist bishop, and Patrick Henry, an American patriot and Virginia's first governor, though some research suggests the name honors Henry's sister Elizabeth Henry Campbell Russell, who lived in nearby Saltville and Chilhowie. The college was founded upon the principles of vital faith and civic engagement by Creed Fulton, a Methodist minister; Colonel William Byars; Tobias Smyth, a Methodist farmer; and Alexander Findlay, a Methodist businessman.

The foundation for Wiley Hall was laid on September 30, 1836. The board of trustees hired Charles Collins as the institution's first president (1838–1852), with classes beginning in the spring of 1838 with 60 students enrolled.

The college closed in April 1861 during the Civil War and was commandeered by the Confederate States of America in 1862, operating as a hospital until 1865. During this time, the campus saw battle during the Battle of Saltville. Shortly after the battle, the hospital was the setting of Lieutenant Smith's murder on October 7, 1864, by Champ Ferguson, who had killed two black Union prisoners at the same hospital the day before. Lieutenant Smith and two other prisoners were recovering from battlefield injuries when Ferguson and some Confederate associates approached the hospital. An Irish-born guard turned them away, even going so far as to point his rifle at them. Ferguson and his men found an alternative means of entry and came across Lt. Smith and others. Smith evidently recognized Ferguson, and despite his pleas for mercy, was shot in his bed by Ferguson. After the war ended, the college reopened.

=== Martha Washington College ===
The administrative operation of Martha Washington College, a Methodist-affiliated school for women located in Abingdon, Virginia, was merged with that of Emory & Henry College in 1918. At its November 1918 session held in Johnson City, Tennessee, the Holston Conference of the Methodist Episcopal Church, South, decided to merge Martha Washington College with Emory & Henry College; all of the property of Martha Washington, including its 8-acre Abingdon campus, would be transferred to Emory & Henry in exchange for Emory & Henry assuming the debts of Martha Washington and operating Martha Washington College as a "co-ordinate woman's college". This arrangement lasted for about a decade, until Martha Washington College completely closed in 1931.

=== World War II and beyond ===
During World War II, Emory & Henry was one of 131 US colleges and universities that took part in the V-12 Navy College Training Program which offered students a path to a Navy commission.

Emory & Henry College's name officially changed on August 1, 2024, to Emory & Henry University.

In June 2025, the university was placed on "Probation for Good Cause" status by its accreditor, the Southern Association of Colleges and Schools, after the accreditor's board found non-compliance with its standards for financial responsibility. The probation was lifted one year later.

== Campus ==
Located in the Virginia Highlands, the Emory & Henry central campus encompasses 168 acres (0.68 km^{2}) and is surrounded by an additional 167 undeveloped acres in the village of Emory. The entire central campus is listed on the National Register of Historic Places and the Virginia Landmarks Register.

=== Buildings ===
With many campus buildings dating from the mid-19th century, several major academic buildings are part of a historic district that is listed on the National Register of Historic Places, including Wiley Hall, which was built 1838 and was used as a Confederate hospital during the Civil War. In recent years, Emory & Henry has experienced a building boom, most notably with the construction of the James H. Brooks Field House, a major expansion of Byars Hall, and the construction of the Woodrow W. McGlothlin Center for the Arts.

Residence halls

Emory & Henry boasts modern and newly renovated campus housing. Among the residence halls are the newly built Elm and Hickory halls, which feature double occupancy rooms, each with its own bathroom. In the Emory "village" students enjoy Prillaman and Linden houses, modern residences that feature single and double occupancy rooms in a home-like setting. Other residence halls include Stuart Hall, Martha Washington Hall and Hillman Hall.

Academics

Academic buildings include McGlothlin-Street Hall which includes Emory & Henry's science programs as well as programs in education, political science, business and history. Historic Byars Hall was recently expanded to include classrooms, rehearsal spaces and office space for the Division of Visual and Performing Arts. The Hermesian and Calliopean rooms, which are home to the college's historic debate societies, have been restored to their early elegance. Students also attend classes on the main E&H campus in the Creed Fulton Observatory, Miller Hall and Wiley Hall.

Other buildings

Other campus buildings include Memorial Chapel, Kelly Library, the King Athletic Center, Brook Field House, Martin-Brock Student Center, Van Dyke, Emily Williams House, and Tobias-Smyth Cabin (a reconstructed log house which was home to one of the college's founders; now a museum and meeting place).

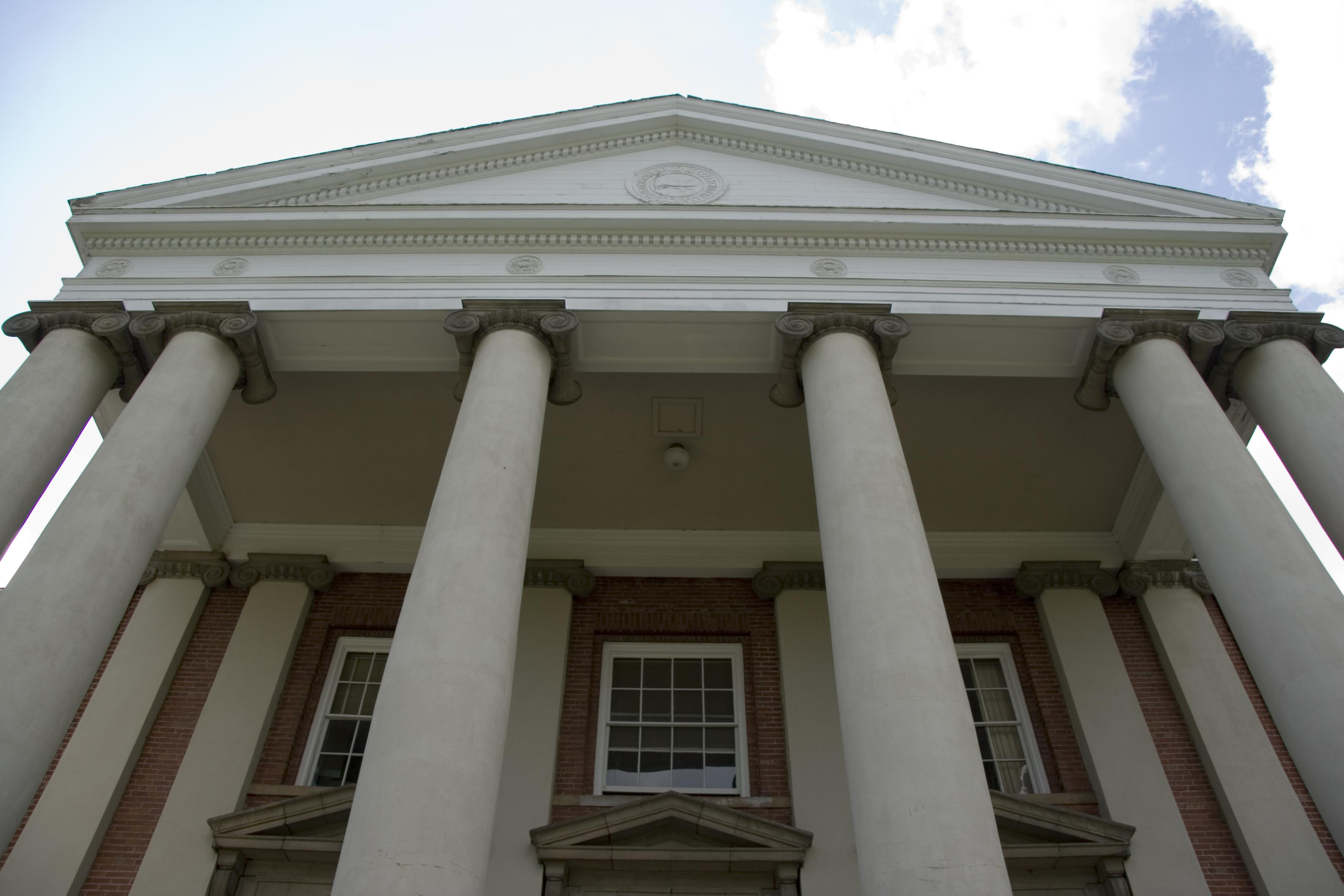
Wiley Hall

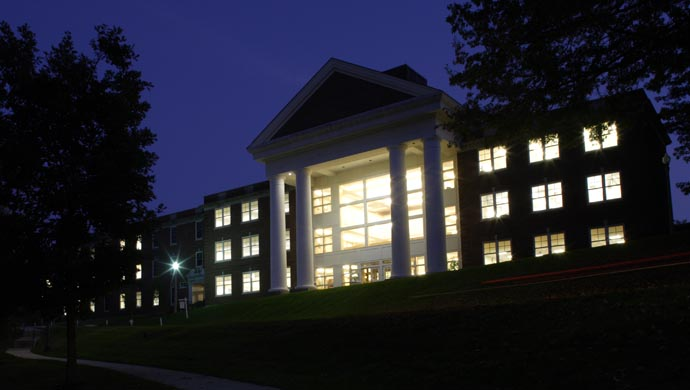
McGlothlin-Street Hall

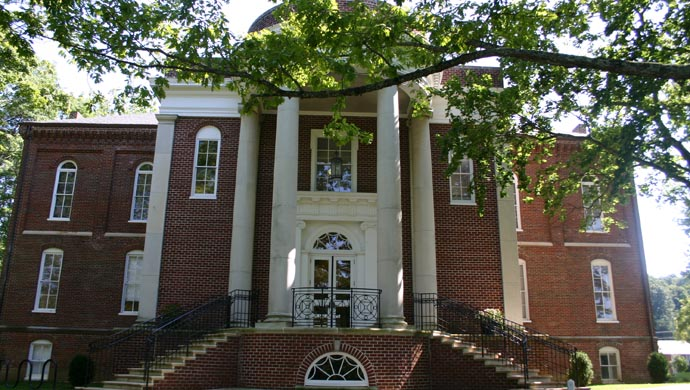
Byars Hall

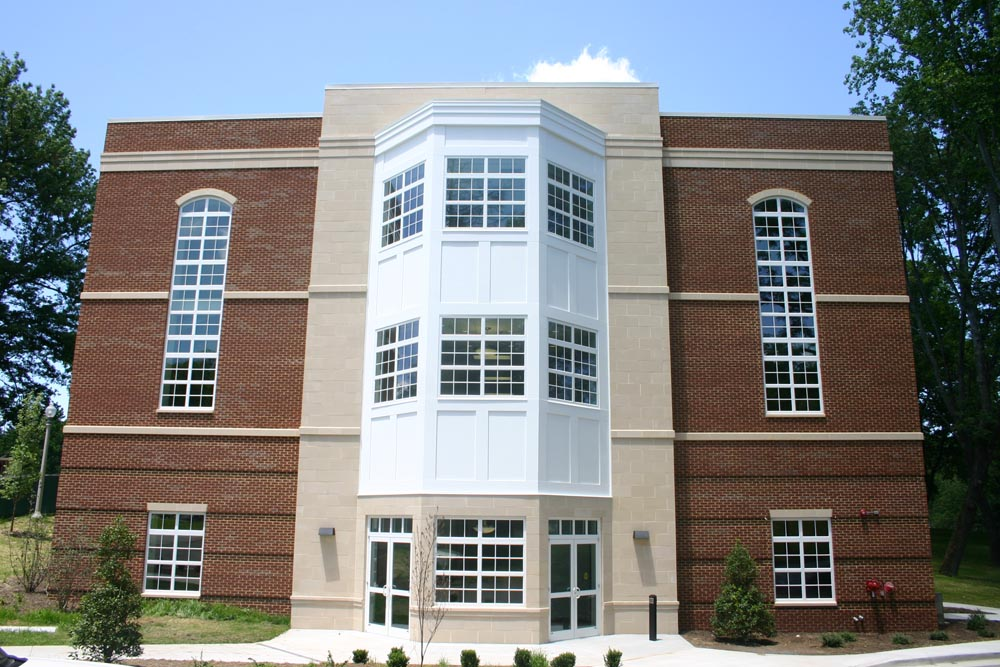
Byars Hall (2009 addition)

== Academics ==
Emory & Henry University's liberal arts academic program is based upon a required four-year core curriculum of history, literature, and culture. The college has more than 25 academic programs of study, offers more than 50 bachelor degrees, and offers master's degrees in education and community and organizational leadership. The college's programs in public policy and community service and international studies have been nationally recognized.

== Athletics ==
Emory & Henry University's sports teams, nicknamed the "Wasps," participate in NCAA Division II in the South Atlantic Conference (SAC). The college sponsors a wide range of athletic teams, including men's teams in football, soccer, basketball, baseball, cheer and dance, golf, equestrian, lacrosse, track and field, cross country, and tennis, as well as women's teams in cross country, volleyball, basketball, softball, soccer, cheer and dance, golf, rugby, equestrian, lacrosse, track and field, tennis, and swimming.

=== Mascot ===
The official Emory & Henry mascot is the Wasp. While there are many rumored origins of the nickname, the most commonly accepted story is that Emory & Henry was first called the Wasps after the football team played its first game in Neyland Stadium at the University of Tennessee. Despite the Volunteers from Tennessee being heavily favored, they only held a 6-0 lead at halftime, this is due to the defensive efforts of Emory & Henry. The local Knoxville newspapers described the college team as the "Wasps" because of the tenacious and swarming defense they displayed, akin to the persistence of wasps in protecting their nest. This description was inspired by the distinctive uniforms worn by the Emory & Henry players, which included blue-gold striped socks and jerseys adorned with blue-gold stripes on the chest and sleeves.

== Traditions ==
Traditions at Emory & Henry University include:

Service Plunge – the college's annual "Service Plunge" is a tradition and a requirement of all incoming freshmen in which they perform community service for a day during the first month of school (usually a Saturday).

Running of the Bulls – The Running of the Bulls is a bi-annual event in which girls who are pledging a sorority are sent running out of the front door of Wiley-Jackson (MaWa) and are told to run towards the sorority which they intend to pledge. The event, although short, is often attended by much of the student population due to its humorous nature.

The Rock – Every athletic team that plays their games at Fred Selfe Stadium touches a giant rock taken from the late Fred Selfe's hometown. Coach Selfe was a long-time assistant coach for the Emory and Henry football team who died of cancer and whose saying "Trust in your teammates, trust in yourself" is painted in the football locker room. Touching the Rock is seen as not only a unifying gesture, but it is supposed to also be a "recognition of all those who wore the blue and gold before you."

The Duck Pond – Emory and Henry is known for having ducks year-round at its duck pond. This is because the pond is naturally heated due to a spring (which can be seen in the corner closest to Wiley Hall in the foundations of the old well house).

== Rankings and recognition ==
In the 2024 edition of U.S. News & World Report's Best Colleges, Emory & Henry University was ranked #21 among Regional Universities in the South.

Emory & Henry University received the Corporation for National and Community Service Presidential Award from President Obama in March 2010. This distinction marked a historic milestone, as Emory & Henry became the first higher education institution in Virginia to receive this award for their contributions to national and community service.

== Notable alumni ==
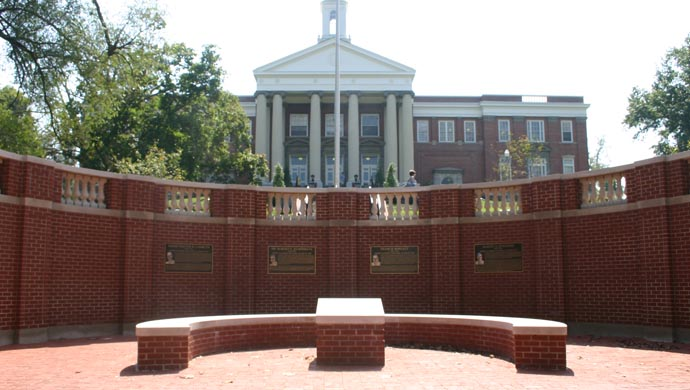
The E&H Alumni Plaza sits midway between Wiley Hall and Memorial Chapel.

=== Literature, television and arts ===
- J. Fred Essary (1903) – journalist
- Kermit Hunter (Re-1931) – playwright and English professor
- Samuel W. Small (1871) – journalist, evangelist, prohibitionist

=== Education ===
- Henry DeLamar Clayton – president of the University of Alabama from 1886 to 1889; Confederate general during Civil War
- Joe L. Kincheloe (1972) – author on education, culture, and politics

=== Military ===
- James Patton Brownlow – brevet brigadier general of the 1st Tennessee Volunteer Cavalry Regiment (Union) during the Civil War
- Thomas T. Handy (enrolled 1908–1911) – deputy chief of staff of the US Army in World War II; signed the orders to drop the atomic bomb on Hiroshima
- William E. "Grumble" Jones (enrolled 1844) – Civil War Brigadier General of the Confederate Cavalry
- Frank Rowlett (1929) – cryptologist who cracked the Japanese code during World War II
- Robert G. Shaver – lawyer, Confederate States Army colonel, and Ku Klux Klan leader.
- J. E. B. Stuart (enrolled 1848–1850) – US Army officer and later a Confederate general during the Civil War

=== Science, research, and medicine ===
- J.B. Wolfe – academic psychologist and behavioral scientist PhD; chair of the Department Of Psychology at the University of Mississippi for 30 years

=== Politics and government ===
- Toni Atkins (1984) – first openly gay speaker of the California State Assembly and President pro tempore of the California State Senate; former acting mayor of San Diego
- Henry Bowen – elected to the Virginia House of Delegates from 1869 to 1873; served two terms in the US House of Representatives
- B. B. Comer (1869) – governor of Alabama from 1907 to 1911
- John M. Fleming (1851) – Tennessee state legislator and newspaper editor
- John Goode (1848) – Virginia congressman, solicitor general of the U.S.
- Morgan Griffith (1980) – elected to the US House of Representatives in 2011 representing Virginia's 9th Congressional District; served in the Virginia House of Delegates from 1994 to 2011; elected House Majority Leader in the House of Delegates in 2000, becoming the first Republican in Virginia to hold that position.
- Joseph P. Johnson (1952) – served in the Virginia House of Delegates from 1966 to 1970; and again from 1990 to 2014
- George C. Peery (1894) – governor of Virginia from 1934 to 1938
- James Buchanan Richmond – nineteenth-century politician and judge; member of the Virginia House of Delegates in 1874 and 1875; elected to the 46th Congress (March 4, 1879-March 3, 1881) representing Virginia's 9th Congressional District; appointed county judge of Scott County 1886-1892; was delegate to the Virginia constitutional convention at Richmond in 1901 and 1902
- Robert P. Shuler (1903) – evangelist and political figure whose attracted a large audience and drew controversy with his attacks on politicians and police officials
- Thomas Slater Smith – former Texas attorney general and speaker of the Texas House of Representatives
- Harley Orrin Staggers (1931) – US congressman from 1949 to 1981; represented West Virginia's 2nd Congressional District for 32 years
- Henry Carter Stuart (1874) – governor of Virginia from 1914 to 1918
- Ariosto A. Wiley, former U.S. Congressman for the 2nd District of Alabama

=== Business ===
- Harold Arthur Poling (1940s) – CEO and chairman of the Ford Motor Company from 1990 to 1993
- Richard Joshua Reynolds (enrolled 1868–1870) – founder of R.J. Reynolds Tobacco Company

=== Sports and athletics ===
- Larry Bales (1968) – former football and baseball college coach
- Glenn Roberts (1930s) – credited as the originator of the modern-day jumpshot in basketball; All-American; scored over 2,000 career points
- Sonny Wade (1969) – 1968 All-American quarterback; drafted by the Philadelphia Eagles in 1969; later played for the Alouettes in the CFL; Grey Cup champion
- Montie Weaver (1927) – pitched for the Washington Senators and the Boston Red Sox from 1931 to 1939
- Mike Young (1986) – Division I college basketball head coach at Virginia Tech
