= Cam Allen =

American football player (born 1999)

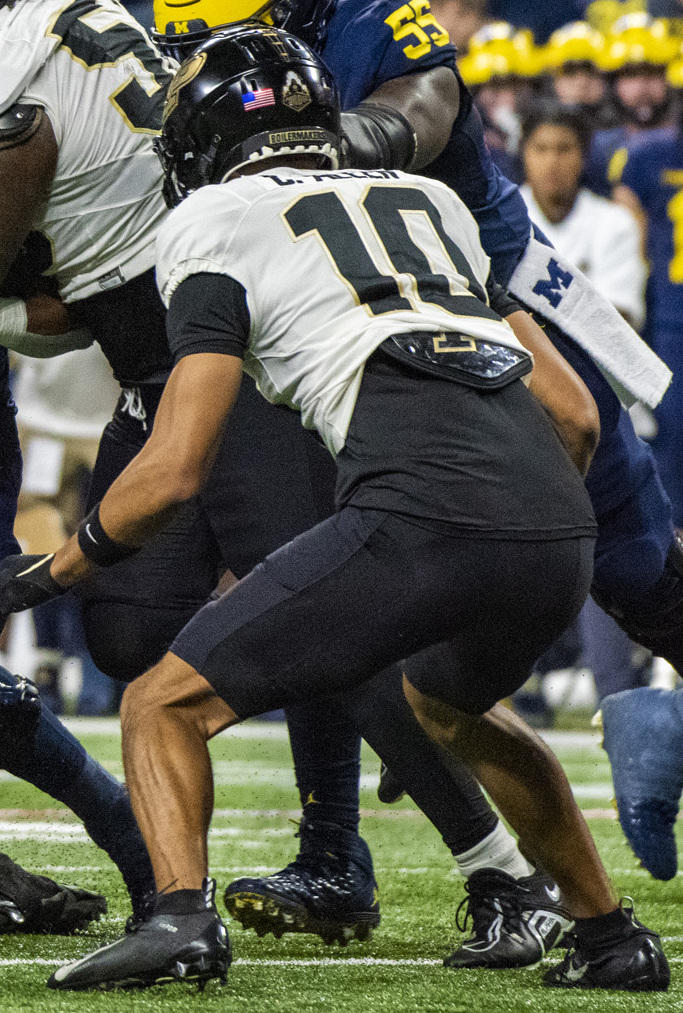
- Allen with the Purdue Boilermakers in 2022

No. 0 – Winnipeg Blue Bombers
- Position: Safety
- Roster status: Active
- CFL status: American

Personal information
- Born: November 22, 1999 (age 26)
- Listed height: 6 ft 1 in (1.85 m)
- Listed weight: 193 lb (88 kg)

Career information
- High school: Graham (Bluefield, Virginia)
- College: Purdue (2019–2023)
- NFL draft: 2024: undrafted

Career history
- Denver Broncos (2024)*; Winnipeg Blue Bombers (2025–present)
- * Offseason or practice squad member only
- Stats at CFL.ca

Cameron Allen (born November 22, 1999) is an American professional football safety for the Winnipeg Blue Bombers of the Canadian Football League (CFL). He played college football at Purdue.

== Early life ==
Allen grew up in Bluefield, Virginia and attended Graham High School. During his senior season, Allen totaled 61 total touchdowns. In Allen's senior season, he was named the Virginia Class Two Offensive and Defensive Player of the Year. Coming out of high school, Allen decided to commit to play college football for the Purdue Boilermakers.

== College career ==
In week seven of the 2021 season, Allen would earn the Big Ten defensive player of the week after notching four tackles and two interceptions, as he helped Purdue upset #2 Iowa. During the 2021 season, Allen tallied 65 tackles, three pass deflections, four interceptions, and a fumble recovery. In week two of the 2022 season, Allen recorded his first career pick-six against Indiana State. In week five, Allen was named the Big Ten defensive player of the week after recording two interceptions in a win over Minnesota. After the conclusion of the 2023 season, Allen decided to declare for the 2024 NFL draft.

Allen finished his career at Purdue with 203 tackles, 31 pass deflections, 13 interceptions, four fumble recoveries, a touchdown, and a blocked field goal.

== Professional career ==
Pre-draft measurables
Height	Weight	Arm length	Hand span	Wingspan	40-yard dash	10-yard split	20-yard split	20-yard shuttle	Three-cone drill	Vertical jump	Broad jump	Bench press
6 ft 1 1/8 in (1.86 m)	200 lb (91 kg)	31 3/4 in (0.81 m)	9 3/4 in (0.25 m)	6 ft 5 in (1.96 m)	4.55 s	1.52 s	2.65 s	4.09 s	6.78 s	34.5 in (0.88 m)	10 ft 3 in (3.12 m)	15 reps
All values from Pro Day

=== Denver Broncos ===
Allen signed with the Denver Broncos as an undrafted free agent on May 10, 2024, but was waived five days later.

=== Winnipeg Blue Bombers ===
On February 4, 2025, Allen signed with the Winnipeg Blue Bombers of the Canadian Football League (CFL).
