= Larry Bales =

American football and baseball coach (born 1947)

Profile
- Position: Wide receiver

Personal information
- Born: August 29, 1947 (age 79); Marion, Virginia, U.S.
- Listed height: 6 ft 0 in (1.83 m)
- Listed weight: 190 lb (86 kg)

Career information
- High school: Marion Senior (VA)
- College: Emory and Henry
- NFL draft: 1969: 7th round, 180th overall pick

Career history

Playing
- Dallas Cowboys (1969)*
- * Offseason or practice squad member only

Coaching
- Emory and Henry College (1979–1981) Football head coach; Emory and Henry College (1978–1980) Baseball head coach

Head coaching record
- Career: 7–22–1 (college football)

Larry Bales (born August 29, 1947) is an American former football and baseball college coach. He played college football at Emory and Henry College.

== Early life ==
Bales attended Marion Senior High School. As a senior in 1964, he was the starter at quarterback, leading the state of Virginia high school quarterbacks in touchdown passes and receiving All-state honors.

He accepted a football scholarship from Emory and Henry College. As a freshman, he was named the starter at quarterback in the fourth game of the season. As a sophomore, he was converted into a halfback and played in 6 games until suffering a season-ending injury.

As a junior, he was moved to flanker, making 48 receptions, while averaging 70.7 receiving yards per game.

As a senior, he registered 96 carries for 684 yards (7.13-yard avg.) and 61 receptions for 1,202 yards (school record). He scored 12 receiving touchdowns, 4 rushing touchdowns and one two-point conversion, totalling 98 points.

He finished his college career with school records in: career receiving yards (2,037), single-season receiving yards (1,202), single-season touchdowns (16) and single-game receiving yards (195). He also practiced baseball.

In 1974, he was inducted into the Emory and Henry Athletics Hall of Fame.

== Professional career ==
Bales was selected by the Dallas Cowboys in the seventh round (180th overall) of the 1969 NFL/AFL draft. He also was tried at cornerback during training camp. He was waived on August 15.

== Coaching career ==
In 1970, Bales began his career as the offensive backs and receivers assistant football coach at Patrick Henry High School. In 1972, he was named the football head coach at Abingdon High School. He served as the football head football coach at Emory and Henry College from 1979 to 1981, compiling a record of 7–22–1. After coaching he worked as an insurance agent for State Farm Insurance.

== Head coaching record ==
=== College football ===
Year	Team	Overall	Conference	Standing	Bowl/playoffs
Emory and Henry Wasps (Old Dominion Athletic Conference) (1979–1981)
1979	Emory and Henry	4–6	2–2	T–2nd	
1980	Emory and Henry	2–8	1–4	6th	
1981	Emory and Henry	1–8–1	0–4–1	T–5th	
Emory and Henry:		7–22–1	3–10–1		
Total:		7–22–1			
