= Richlands High School (Richlands, Virginia) =

Public high school in Virginia, US

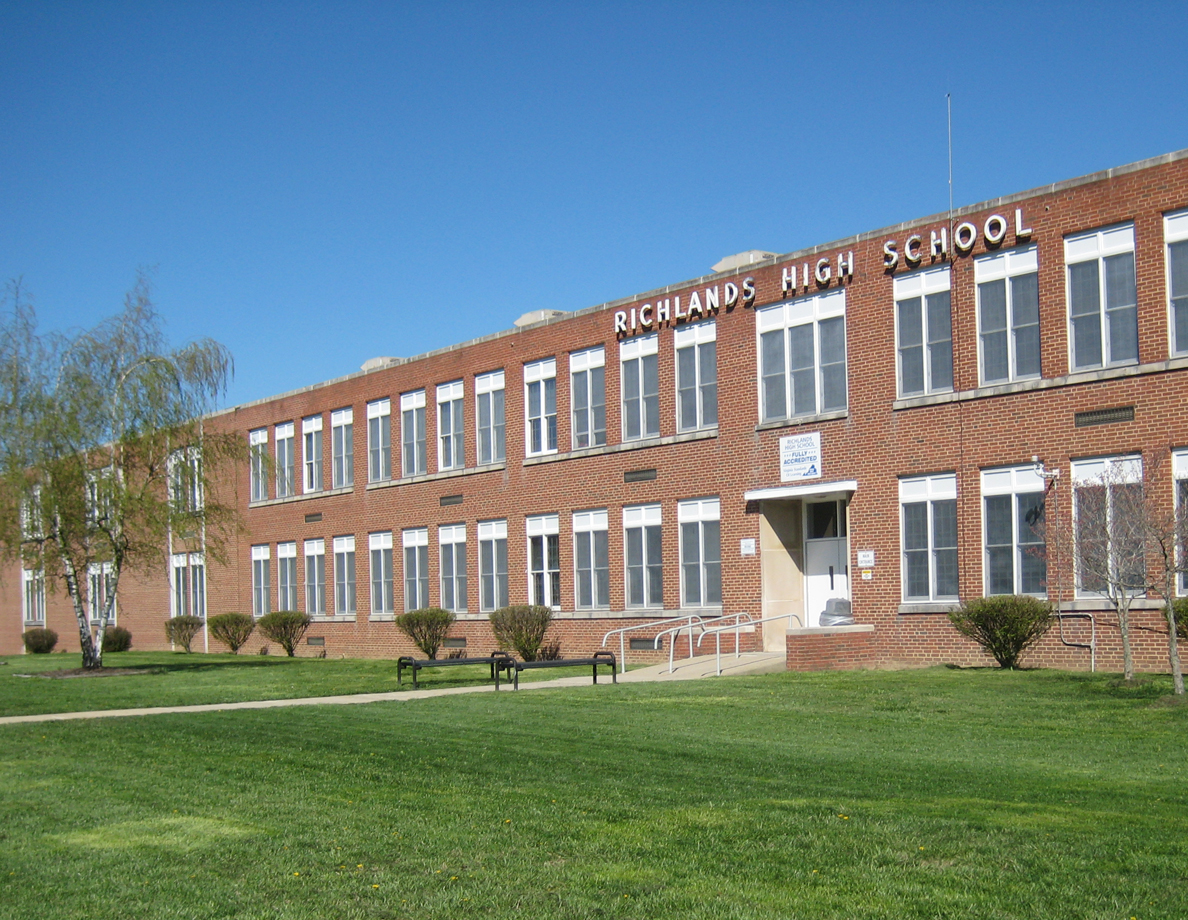

Location
- 138 Tornado Alley; Cedar Bluff, Virginia 24609; United States
- 37°5′33.7″N 81°46′36.8″W

Information
- School type: Public, high school
- Locale: Town, distant
- School district: Tazewell County Public Schools
- NCES District ID: 5103810
- NCES School ID: 510381001661
- Principal: Rickie Vencill
- Teaching staff: 59.50 (on an FTE basis)
- Grades: 9–12
- Enrollment: 557 (2024–25)
- Student to teacher ratio: 9.36
- Colors: Navy & white
- Athletics conference: Southwest District; Region IV
- Mascot: Blue Tornado
- Rivals: Tazewell Bulldogs; Graham G-MEN
- Website: rhs.tcpsva.org

Richlands High School is located in Richlands, Virginia, United States, in Tazewell County. Athletic teams compete in the Virginia High School League's AA Southwest District in Region IV.

== Academics ==
- The 2006 History TCAC (Tazewell County Academic Competition) team won their competition.
- The 2007 Science TCAC team tied with the Tazewell Team (4–2), but in the end Tazewell had more points, giving them the trophy.

== Athletic championships ==
The Richlands Blue Tornados have won two VHSL AA state championships and numerous regional and district championships in a variety of sports.

The Richlands Football team had posted an outstanding 33 game regular season win streak lasting from the 2004 season to the '07 season and three state championship game appearances. They had two undefeated regular seasons in that period, along with the "Perfect Storm" of 14–0 in the 2006 campaign, culminating in a state championship.

Their major rivals are Tazewell High School and Graham High School.

Richlands and Tazewell play for the James C. Ramey Cup. Richlands leads the all-time series against their county rivals, 53-42-2, including 17 straight wins from 2004 to 2019.

The Blues shut out the Bulldogs for four straight seasons from 1994 to 1997 (116-0) and 2016 to 2019 (144-0), the Richlands High School Classes of 1998 and 2020, played their varsity careers without conceding a single point to Tazewell.

Richlands also maintains long-standing active rivalries against their other county rival, the Graham G-Men. The two teams met for the 100th time in 2021, a 35-0 victory at Ernie Hicks Stadium for the G-Men. Graham leads the all-time series 56-39-5, including six straight victories dating to 2017.

Richlands also had a long-standing rivalry against the Grundy Golden Wave, having played every year from 1944 to 2010, and again from 2013 to 2016. Richlands leads that all-time series 58-23-3, winning every matchup between the two since 1998 (17 straight victories). The two teams have not met in regular season play since 2016, the result of Grundy’s reclassification to 1A play.

Richlands has also played Virginia High, Marion, Gate City, and Abingdon over 50 times each.

Richlands leads the RL-VA series, 40-28-2.

Richlands leads the RL-MAR series, 45-17-1.

Richlands leads the RL-GC series, 27-24-1.

Richlands leads the RL-AB series, 29-16-6.

The school has been state football champions in 1992 and 2006.

The Blue Tornado Football Team has a 550-385-34 record all-time. The Blues were to play their 1,000th game in the 2024 or 2025 season.

The school has been state football runner-ups in 2004, 2005, 2007, 2010, and 2016.

The school has been state softball champions in 1995, 1996, and 2019.

== Traditions ==
The school has a longstanding tradition of "Blue News", wherein the school's seniors write a news report each week. This is now delivered through a YouTube channel.

== Marching band ==
The Richlands High School Blue Tornado Band won overall best band at the AT&T Cotton Bowl and 14 time Virginia Honor Band titles. The Band has also participated in the Macy's Thanksgiving Day Parade in New York City twice, and the Inaugural Parades of multiple Virginia Governors.

== Yearbook ==
The Tornado yearbook has won several honors. The 2009 "Taking the World by Storm" book won a first place VHSL Award and Taylor Publishing National Yearbook Honorable Mention. The 2010 "Notorious" book also won a first place VHSL Award.

== Scholastic Bowl ==
The 2021-22 Richlands High School Scholastic Bowl team, coached by Christopher Hale, finished third in the state competition, their second best performance to date.

The 2022-23 Richlands High School Scholastic Bowl team, coached by Hale, finished second in the state competition, their best performance to date.

== Other school groups ==
- E-Sports team
- DECA
- Gifted Program

== Notable alumni ==
- Mike Compton – American football center for the Detroit Lions and New England Patriots
- Richard Cranwell – former chairman of the Democratic Party of Virginia
- Devon Johnson – Marshall Thundering Herd football, Carolina Panthers
