= Ahmad Bradshaw =

American football player (born 1986)

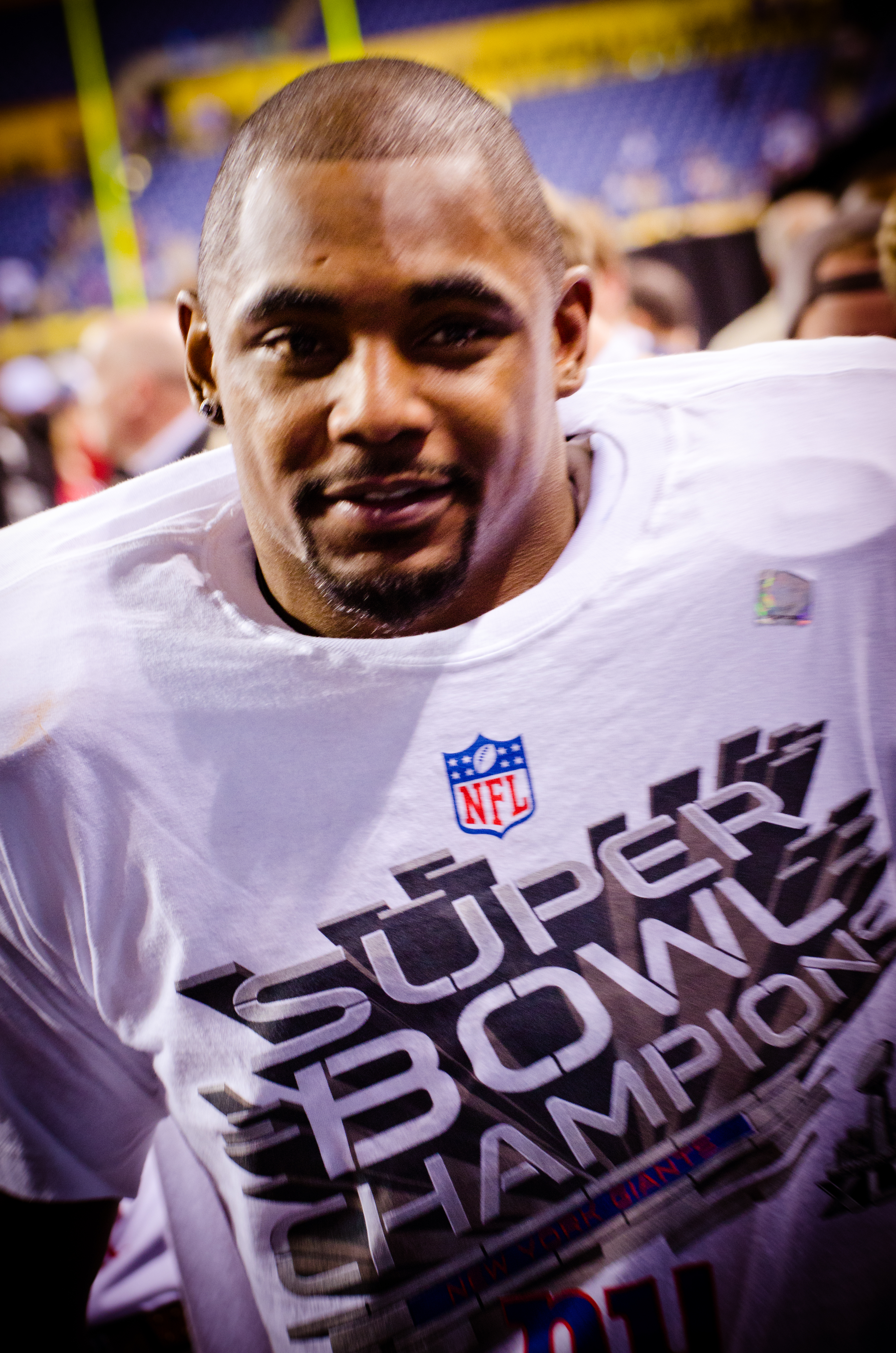
- Bradshaw with the New York Giants after winning Super Bowl XLVI in 2012

No. 44
- Position: Running back

Personal information
- Born: March 19, 1986 (age 40); Bluefield, Virginia, U.S.
- Listed height: 5 ft 10 in (1.78 m)
- Listed weight: 217 lb (98 kg)

Career information
- High school: Graham (Bluefield)
- College: Marshall (2004–2006)
- NFL draft: 2007: 7th round, 250th overall pick

Career history
- New York Giants (2007–2012); Indianapolis Colts (2013–2015)

Awards and highlights
- 2× Super Bowl champion (XLII, XLVI); 84th greatest New York Giant of all-time; 2× All-Conference USA (2005, 2006)

Career NFL statistics
- Rushing attempts: 1,083
- Rushing yards: 4,928
- Rushing touchdowns: 36
- Receptions: 187
- Receiving yards: 1,493
- Receiving touchdowns: 12
- Stats at Pro Football Reference

Ahmad Bradshaw (born March 19, 1986) is an American former professional football player who was a running back in the National Football League (NFL). He played college football for the Marshall Thundering Herd. Bradshaw was selected in the seventh round of the 2007 NFL draft by the New York Giants. He is a two-time Super Bowl champion, winning Super Bowls XLII and XLVI as a member of the Giants, defeating the New England Patriots each time. He was the leading rusher in each game, becoming one of eight running backs in NFL history to be the leading rusher in two Super Bowls.

== Early life ==
Ahmad Bradshaw was born in Bluefield, Virginia to Diana Davis and James Bradshaw, and played high school football, basketball and ran track at Graham High School. He was ranked as the #7 player in Virginia and the #28 cornerback prospect in the country by Rivals.com. He rushed for 2,282 yards and 27 touchdowns as a junior and 2,557 rushing yards and 31 touchdowns as a senior, totaling 5,265 yards and 92 touchdowns while averaging nearly ten yards a carry for his high school career. He earned All-Virginia honors and was named VHSL AA Player of the Year.

Bradshaw was also on the Graham High track & field team, where he competed as a sprinter and jumper. In sprints, he recorded times of 6.75 seconds in the 55 metres and 11.34 seconds in the 100 meters. In jumping events, he got a personal-best leap of 1.80 meters in the high jump.

Bradshaw originally signed a letter of intent to Virginia and arrived in Charlottesville for football practice, but was kicked off the team by Al Groh before his first season started, after being arrested for underage drinking and running from police. He then enrolled at Marshall University, where his college career would result in his induction into the Marshall Athletic Hall of Fame.

== College career ==
=== Freshman season (2004) ===
With the Thundering Herd, Bradshaw only had 462 yards and three touchdowns in his freshman season in 2004, but also totaled 187 yards receiving on 14 receptions for two touchdowns. He missed two games that season, the Georgia and Miami games, due to an ankle sprain sustained during a stellar fourth quarter performance at Ohio State. He also recorded nine punt returns for 108 yards and 15 kick returns for 322 yards as a freshman. Bradshaw rushed for a then career-high 145 yards, including a 77-yard touchdown run, in just eight first half carries against Western Michigan. His other signature performance of the season came against Kansas State University, when he took a screen pass 75-yards for a score.

=== Sophomore season (2005) ===
Bradshaw rushed for 997 yards and totaled 1,382 all-purpose yards en route to becoming a second-team All-Conference USA selection as a sophomore in 2005. He was the team's leading rusher and receiver as well. In the season-opener against William & Mary, Bradshaw rushed for 72 yards and a touchdown with 73 yards and a score receiving. He rushed for 99 yards and a touchdown in the loss to #3 Virginia Tech. He followed it up with a then career-high 133 yards against the University of Texas at El Paso and eclipsed the mark the following week in the Herd's overtime loss to Southern Miss with 150 yards and a score. Bradshaw's best performance came against East Carolina, when he rushed for a season and career-high 187 yards with two touchdowns along with 51 yards on eight receptions. He added a season-long 56-yard run against ECU as well.

=== Junior season (2006) ===
Bradshaw's best season of his college career came as a junior in 2006, when he totaled 1,523 yards rushing, for 19 touchdowns, and 129 receiving yards for two scores. He was eighth in the nation in rushing yardage and tied for third in rushing touchdowns. In the Herd's second game of the season against Hofstra, Bradshaw ran for 152 yards and four touchdowns. Against the University of Central Florida, he ran for 181 yards and a score. Bradshaw's first out of two 200-yard games of the season came two weeks later against the University of Alabama-Birmingham, when he rushed for 242 yards and two touchdowns. Against UTEP, he rushed for career-highs of 261 yards and five touchdowns.

== Professional career ==
Pre-draft measurables
Height	Weight	Arm length	Hand span	40-yard dash	10-yard split	20-yard split	20-yard shuttle	Three-cone drill	Vertical jump	Broad jump
5 ft 9 1/2 in (1.77 m)	198 lb (90 kg)	31 1/2 in (0.80 m)	8 1/2 in (0.22 m)	4.66 s	1.66 s	2.75 s	4.09 s	6.70 s	34 in (0.86 m)	9 ft 4 in (2.84 m)
All values from NFL Combine

=== New York Giants ===
==== 2007 ====
Bradshaw was selected by the New York Giants in the seventh round with the 250th overall pick of the 2007 NFL draft. In his first two games, Bradshaw fumbled twice on kickoff returns. He was fourth in the National Football Conference with a 26.0-yard kickoff return average when the Giants replaced him with veteran Reuben Droughns. Bradshaw returned to returning kickoffs for the November 18 game against the Detroit Lions.

Injuries to teammates Brandon Jacobs and Derrick Ward, and the disappointing play of Droughns, gave Bradshaw his first regular season carries against the Minnesota Vikings. He gained 29 yards on four carries in the game. On December 23, 2007, he scored his first NFL touchdown on an 88-yard run in the fourth quarter against the Buffalo Bills. It was the third longest run in Giants history and the longest run of the 2007 season. He finished the game with a 151 yards on 17 carries.

Bradshaw was used more frequently as a change of pace back to Jacobs during the Giants 2007 playoff run. He had a great performance in the NFC Championship Game in Green Bay, including a 52-yard would-be touchdown run in the fourth quarter that was negated by a holding penalty. He contributed greatly to his team's success in Super Bowl XLII against the New England Patriots, gaining 45 yards (the most of all running backs) and even recovering a fumble by quarterback Eli Manning. The Giants went on to win the Super Bowl, defeating the previously undefeated New England Patriots 17−14, and ending their opponent's bid for a perfect 19–0 season.

==== 2008 ====
Bradshaw averaged 6.7 yards per carry as the third running back for the Giants in 2008. He had 67 carries for 355 rushing yards and one rushing touchdown and added a receiving touchdown. He was reduced to third string running back due to a strong performance by Derrick Ward, who finished the season with more than 1,000 rushing yards.

==== 2009 ====
In 2009, Bradshaw was second string running back behind Brandon Jacobs with Derrick Ward's departure to the Tampa Bay Buccaneers. In Week 5, against the Oakland Raiders, he had 165 scrimmage yards and two rushing touchdowns in the 44–7 win. He rushed for a then career-high 778 yards and seven touchdowns on the season. Bradshaw also had a career receiving long play of 55 yards.

==== 2010 ====
Bradshaw was promoted to first-string running back ahead of Brandon Jacobs in 2010, due to Jacobs's disappointing 2009 season. In Week 4, he had 23 carries for 129 yards and one touchdown in a 17–3 win over the Bears. In Week 6, he had 19 carries for 133 yards in a 28–20 win over the Detroit Lions. In Week 7, he had 24 carries for 126 yards in a 41–35 win over the Cowboys. After a two turnover game against the Eagles in Week 9, Bradshaw was demoted to make room for Brandon Jacobs's return.

Despite these obstacles, Bradshaw finished the season with career highs in rushing yards (1,235) and rushing touchdowns (8).

==== 2011 ====
In 2011, Bradshaw signed a four-year deal worth $18 million and $9 million guaranteed with a $5 million bonus. In Week 3, against the Eagles, he had 139 scrimmage yards and a receiving touchdown in the 29–16 win. In Week 6 against the Buffalo Bills, Bradshaw recorded three touchdowns with 104 rushing yards in a 27−24 Giants win. He was benched for the first half of a game against the Dallas Cowboys in Week 14 due to an alleged curfew violation. Bradshaw rushed for nine touchdowns during the season, a career-high mark.

Bradshaw scored the go-ahead and eventual game-winning touchdown with a 6-yard run with 57 seconds remaining in Super Bowl XLVI against the New England Patriots. The touchdown was unusual in that the Patriots permitted Bradshaw to score unopposed, to prevent the Giants from running out most of the remaining time before winning the game with a field goal. Bradshaw, aware of the Patriots' strategy, attempted to stop himself from crossing the goal line but fell backward into the end zone. The Patriots failed to score, however, and the Giants thus won 21−17.

==== 2012 ====
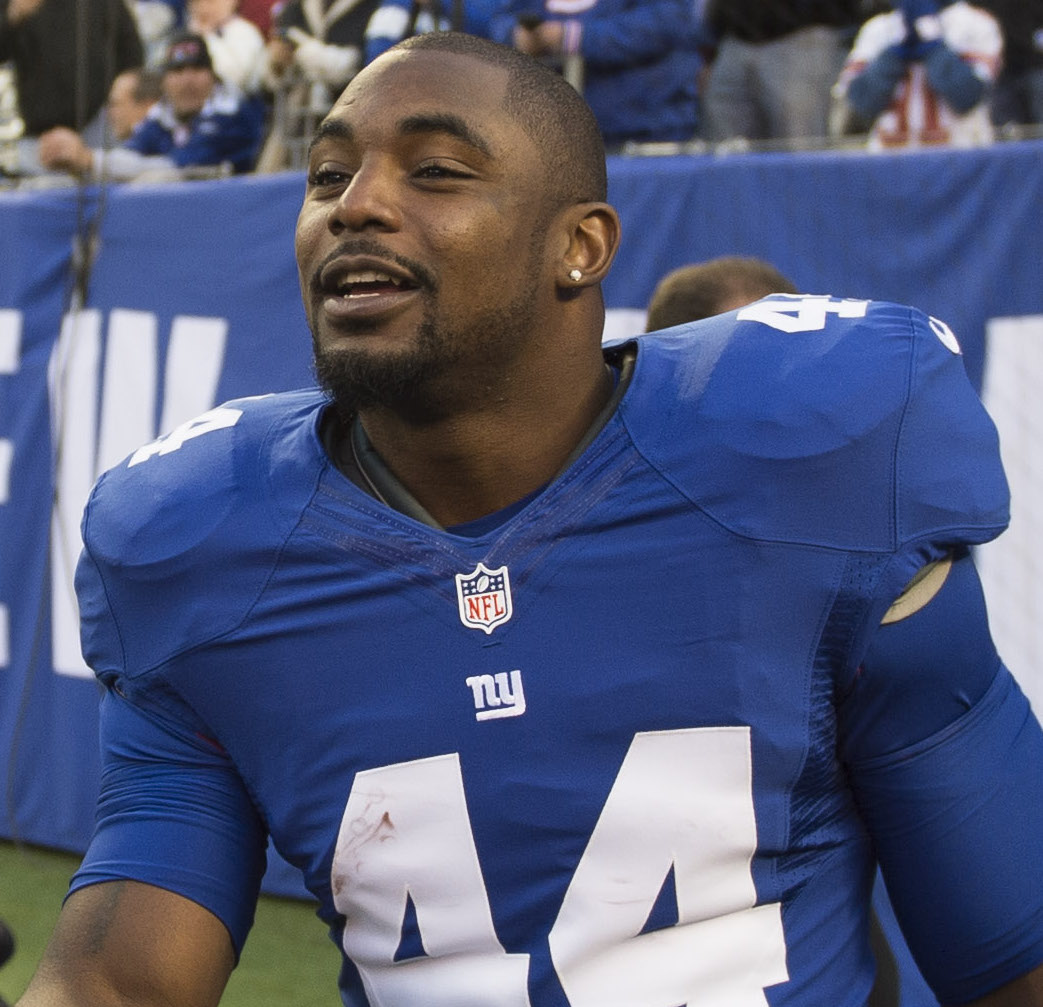
Bradshaw with the Giants in 2012

Although Bradshaw mostly played along rookie David Wilson for the starting role, he had a fairly decent season. Bradshaw missed only two games due to injuries to his knee and foot. Despite having his minutes declining because of Wilson, He played in 14 games, had 221 rushing attempts, 1,015 rushing yards, and six touchdowns. It was the second time in his career that Bradshaw had 1,000+ rushing yards (the first being in 2010). On October 7, during a Week 5 game against the Cleveland Browns, Bradshaw carried the ball 30 times for 200 yards, with 1 touchdown, a 4-yard run; he also had 4 receptions for 29 yards, giving him 229 yards of total offense. The Giants would win against the Browns 41−27. In Week 17, he had 148 scrimmage yards and one rushing touchdown in a 42–7 win over the Eagles.

Bradshaw was released by the Giants on February 6, 2013, to clear cap space and after the emergence of the rookie David Wilson.

=== Indianapolis Colts ===
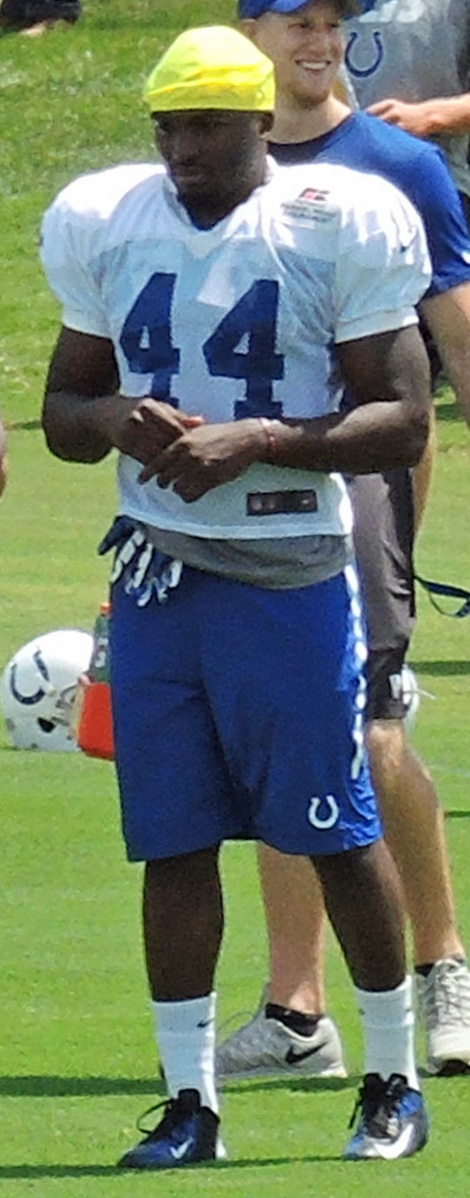
Bradshaw in 2015 at training camp

On June 11, 2013, Bradshaw signed with the Indianapolis Colts. After an injury sustained in Week 3, Bradshaw was put on injured reserve due to needing neck surgery. He had two rushing touchdowns on the 2013 season in three games.

On March 11, 2014, Bradshaw reached a one-year agreement to re-sign with the Colts. Prior to his injury in Week 6, Bradshaw had a career-high six touchdown receptions, leading all NFL running backs, and was on pace to break Marshall Faulk's record of 9. In the 2014 season, he finished with 90 carries for 425 rushing yards and two rushing touchdowns to go with 38 receptions for 300 receiving yards and six receiving touchdowns.

On October 14, 2015, Bradshaw agreed to terms on a one-year deal with the Colts. On November 30, he was placed on season-ending injured reserve with a wrist injury. He had two receiving touchdowns in Week 11 against the Atlanta Falcons in a 24–21 victory. He finished the 2015 season with 31 carries for 85 rushing yards and ten receptions for 64 receiving yards and three receiving touchdowns.

Bradshaw participated in The Spring League in April 2017.

== Career statistics ==
=== NFL ===
Legend
	Won the Super Bowl
	Led the league
**Bold**	Career high

==== Regular season ====
General			Rushing						Receiving				Fumbles	
Year	Team	GP	Att	Yds	Avg	Y/G	Lng	TD	Rec	Yds	Lng	TD	Fum	Lost
2007	NYG	12	23	190	**8.3**	15.8	**88T**	1	2	12	11	0	2	1
2008	NYG	15	67	355	5.3	23.7	77	1	5	42	18T	1	3	0
2009	NYG	15	163	778	4.8	51.9	38	7	21	207	55	0	3	2
2010	NYG	**16**	**276**	**1,235**	4.5	**77.2**	48T	8	**47**	**314**	18	0	**7**	**6**
2011	NYG	12	171	659	3.9	54.9	37	**9**	34	267	26	2	1	1
2012	NYG	14	221	1,015	4.6	72.5	37	6	23	245	**59**	0	3	3
2013	IND	3	41	186	4.5	62.0	27	2	7	42	14	0	0	0
2014	IND	10	90	425	4.7	42.5	29	2	38	300	22	**6**	3	2
2015	IND	4	18	47	2.6	11.8	23	0	3	24	8T	1	0	0
Career		101	1,070	4,890	4.6	48.4	88	36	180	1,453	59	10	22	15

==== Playoffs ====
General			Rushing					Receiving			
Year	Team	GP	Att	Yds	Avg	Lng	TD	Rec	Yds	Lng	TD
2007	NYG	**4**	48	208	**4.3**	13	**1**	4	27	9	0
2011	NYG	**4**	**63**	**272**	**4.3**	**30**	**1**	**16**	**114**	**30**	0
Total		8	111	480	4.3	30	2	20	141	30	0

=== College ===
			Rushing					Fumbles		Receiving				
**Year**	**Team**	**G**	**Att**	**Yards**	**AVG**	**LNG**	**TD**	**FUM**	**LOST**	**Rec**	**Yards**	**Y/R**	**TD**	**LNG**
2004	Marshall	8	95	462	4.9	77	3	0		14	187	13.4	2	75
2005	Marshall	11	214	997	4.7	56	9	0		56	381	6.8	1	52
2006	Marshall	12	249	1,523	6.1	67	19	0	0	17	129	7.6	2	26
Total		31	558	2,982	5.3	77	31			87	697	8.0	5	75

== Legal troubles ==
In 2004, Bradshaw was dismissed from the football team at the University of Virginia after pleading guilty to underage drinking and resisting arrest. After police attempted to break up a party, he fled the scene in an effort to avoid them. The results were two misdemeanor convictions and a probationary sentence. Bradshaw never played a down for the Virginia Cavaliers.

During his junior year at Marshall University, Bradshaw was sentenced to two years probation for petty larceny. He stole a PlayStation from another student's dormitory room. Two years later in June 2008, he was sentenced to 60 days in Abingdon Regional Jail for violating probation for a sealed juvenile charge. Bradshaw cut a deal in which he was able to serve his time in the off-season. In 2008, he served 29 days and reported to training camp on time. On February 15, 2009, he surrendered himself to Virginia authorities in order to finish the final 31 days of his sentence.

Bradshaw also attended the party where wide receiver Plaxico Burress accidentally shot himself in the thigh. Bradshaw was not aware Burress had a gun.

On June 22, 2015, Bradshaw was suspended for one game by the NFL for violating the league's policy and program of substance abuse. Bradshaw was charged with possession of marijuana.

== Other appearances ==
Bradshaw appeared on Onion SportsDome in 2011.
