= Lebanon High School (Virginia) =

Location
- 105 Charles C Long Drive; Lebanon, Virginia; Southwest Virginia; Lebanon, Russell County, Virginia 24266; United States; 36°53′18.6″N 82°6′35.9″W

Information
- School type: Public, high school
- Motto: "Forward Always Forward"
- Opened: September 3, 1985
- Status: Open
- School board: Russell County Public Schools
- NCES District ID: 510342002042
- Superintendent: Kim Hooker
- NCES School ID: 510342002042
- Principal: Ryan Potts
- Grades: 8-12
- Enrollment: 606 (2022–2023)
  - Grade 8: 115
  - Grade 9: 135
  - Grade 10: 119
  - Grade 11: 117
  - Grade 12: 120
- Language: English
- Schedule type: Block Scheduling
- Hours in school day: 8:30 AM - 3:16 PM
- Color: Red White Black
- Athletics: Baseball, Basketball, Cross-Country, Football, Forensics, Golf, Indoor Track, Marching Band, Outdoor Track & Field, Scholastic Bowl, Sideline Cheer, Soccer, Softball, Tennis, Theatre, Volleyball, Wrestling
- Athletics conference: VHSL Class 2 VHSL Region D VHSL Southwest District
- Mascot: Pioneer
- Nickname: The Pioneers
- Rival: Castlewood High School Honaker High School
- Yearbook: "The Pioneer"
- Communities served: Barnett, Cleveland, Elk Garden, Hansonville, Lebanon, Rosedale, Willis
- Feeder schools: Lebanon Middle School
- Graduates (2023): 110
- Website: www.russell.k12.va.us/o/lhs
- Last updated: March 10th, 2024

Lebanon High School is a public high school located in the town of Lebanon, Virginia which is also the county seat of Russell County, Virginia. They are a part of the Russell County Public Schools system and have been accredited by the Virginia Department of Education for the 2023–24 school year.

== History ==
Before the opening of present-day Lebanon High School on September 3, 1985, the school was located at what is now Lebanon Middle School. The newly built school provided modern facilities and enhanced resources and capacity for students and faculty.

=== Barack Obama visit ===
On September 9, 2008, then presidential candidate Barack Obama gave a speech from the Lebanon High School gymnasium in an attempt to connect with voters of rural Southwest Virginia. He elaborated and explained his plan to address economic issues, energy solutions, job losses, as well as universal healthcare if he was to become president. During his speech, he made it clear that he was not against gun rights and believed in the Second Amendment. In addition, he reiterated that he was "a friend of coal," a stable of Southwest Virginia's economy. During his event, he took several questions from both the youth and adults of the crowd. Before he took the stage, he was introduced by Virginia's former 9th district congressman, Rick Boucher (D-VA).

== School structure ==
Ryan Potts is the current principal.

== Curriculum ==
Lebanon High offers students the opportunity to enroll in dual enrollment courses from Southwest Virginia Community College. These courses are not online and are taught by the teacher in the student's classroom. If students prefer online learning, they have the ability to enroll in online courses through Virtual Virginia and A. Linwood Holton Governor's School. In addition to those options, honors and career/technical courses are also available to students wanting to learn in person.

During the 2022-2023 school year, 23.1% of students were classified as having chronic absenteeism, meaning they had missed 10% or more of the school year. In the same school year, 74.8% of students met one criterion of being College, Career, and Civically Ready (CCRI). Additionally, the Virginia Department of Education awarded the school Level One, the highest level, of academic achievement for all three measurable subjects: English, Math, and Science. Over the course of their education, 7.87% of the students in the Class of 2023 dropped out of school before graduating.

=== Classes offered ===
Subject	Class	Dual Enrollment	Honors
Agriculture	Applied Agriculture Concepts	---	---
	Equine Science	---	---
	Introduction to Animal Systems	---	---
	Introduction to Power, Structural, and Technical Systems	---	---
	Livestock Production Management	---	---
Art	Art I-IV	---	---
CTE	Advanced Computer Information Systems (ACIS)	Yes	---
	Computer Applications	---	---
	Computer Information Systems (CIS)	---	---
	Cybersecurity I-III	---	---
	Digital Applications	---	---
	Economics and Personal Finance	---	---
Engineering	Digital Electronics (DE)	---	---
	Engineering Design and Development (EDD)	---	---
	Introduction to Engineering Design (IED)	---	---
	Principles of Engineering (POE)	---	---
English	English 8	---	---
	English 9-11	---	Yes
	English 12	Yes	---
	Photojournalism	---	---
Foreign Language	Spanish I-IV	---	---
Mathematics	Algebra I-II	---	---
	Algebra Functions & Data Analysis (AFDA)	---	---
	Computer Math	---	---
	Calculus	Yes	---
	Geometry	---	Yes
	Trigonometry	Yes	---
Physical Education	Regular & Advanced Physical Education	---	---
	Driver and Traffic Safety Education	---	---
	Health	---	---
Science	Biology I	---	---
	Biology II	Yes	---
	Anatomy	Yes	---
	Chemistry I	---	---
	Earth Science I-II	---	---
	Science 8	---	---
Social Studies	U.S. History	Yes	---
	U.S. Government	---	Yes
	World Geography	---	---
	World History II	---	---
Vocational	Automotive Technology 1 & 2	---	---
	Automotive Body Repair 1 & 2	---	---
	Building Trades 1 & 2	---	---
	Cosmetology 1 & 2	---	---
	Criminal Justice 1 & 2	---	---
	Culinary Arts 1 & 2	---	---
	Masonry 1 & 2,	---	---
	Welding 1 & 2	---	---
	Introduction to Health and Medical Sciences	---	---
	Certified Nurse Aide (CNA)	---	---
	Veterinary Assistant 1 & 2	---	---
	Horticultural Sciences	---	---
Other	Chorus (Choir)	---	---
	Band	---	---
	Speech and Drama	---	---

== Extracurricular activities ==
=== Athletics ===
Lebanon High School is currently a member of the Virginia High School League and participates in the Southwest District as well as the Region 2D conference. They offer students the opportunity to participate in 17 different VHSL sports in the fall, winter, and spring. The school mascot is the Pioneer with red, white, and black being the school's team colors. The "Pioneers" have won several team and individual state championships.

LHS Team State Champions
Athletic/Academic Activity	School Year	Team	VHSL Class	Ref.
Basketball	1963-1964	Boys Varsity	Group II	
Basketball	1990-1991	Boys Varsity	Group A	
Outdoor Track	2007-2008	Boys Varsity	Group A	
Softball	2015-2016	Girls Varsity	Group 2A	
Baseball	2020-2021	Boys Varsity	Class 2	
Cross Country	2022-2023	Boys Varsity	Class 1	
Baseball	2022-2023	Boys Varsity	Class 1	
Cross Country	2023-2024	Boys Varsity	Class 2	

Sport	Season	Home Location
Baseball*	Spring	"Doc Adams Baseball Field"
Basketball*	Winter	"Charles C. Long Gymnasium"
Cross-Country*	Fall	"Through the Pines" Cross Country Course
Football*	Fall	"Tommy Bryant Stadium"
Forensics	Winter	"Little Theatre"
Golf	Fall	N/A
Indoor Track	Winter	N/A
Marching Band	Fall	"Tommy Bryant Stadium"
Outdoor Track and Field*	Spring	Lebanon High School (Not in use)
Scholastic Bowl	Winter	Lebanon High School
Sideline Cheer*	Fall	"Tommy Bryant Stadium"
Soccer**	Spring	"Tommy Bryant Stadium"
Softball*	Spring	"Shelia Adams Softball Field"
Tennis	Spring	J.S. Easterly Park
Theatre	Fall	"Little Theatre"
Volleyball*	Fall	"Charles C. Long Gymnasium"
Wrestling	Winter	"Charles C. Long Gymnasium"

*Separate 8th Grade, Junior Varsity, and Varsity Team, **Separate Junior Varsity and Varsity Team
