= Graham High School (Bluefield, Virginia) =

Public high school in Virginia, US

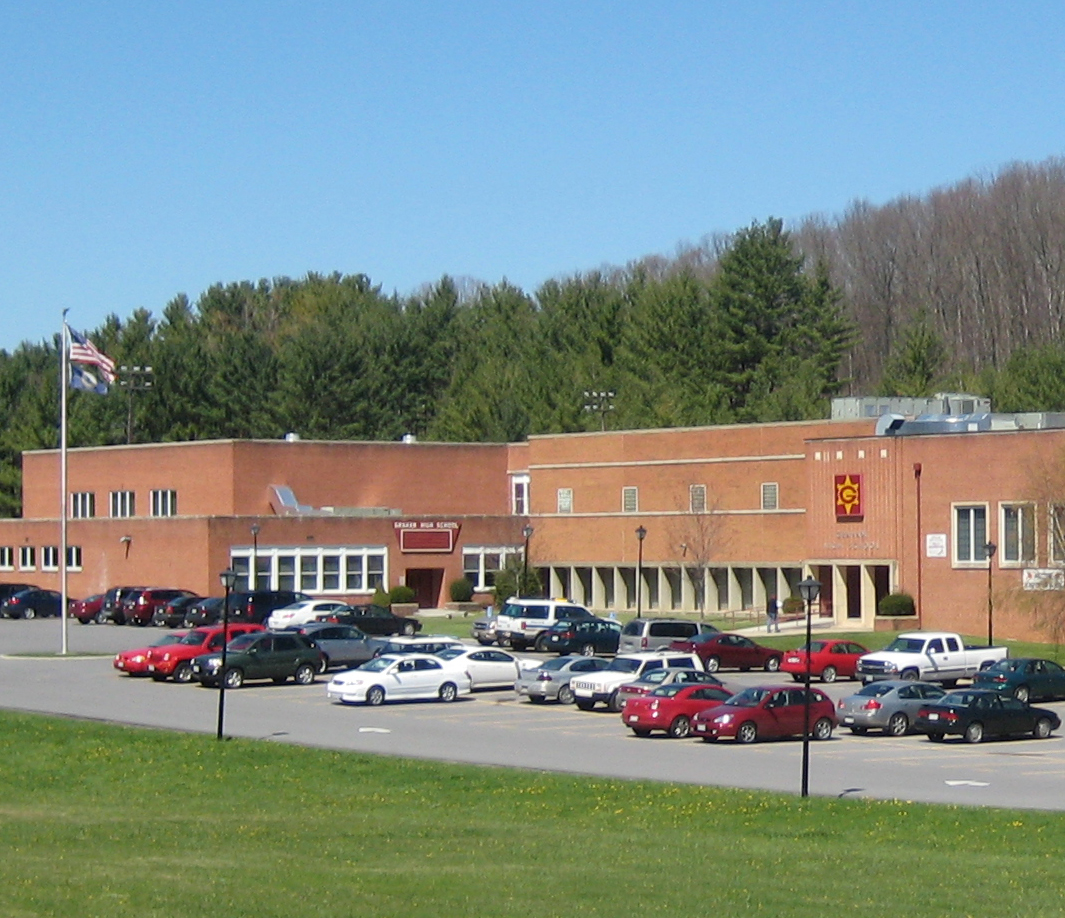

Location
- 210 Valleydale Street; Bluefield, Virginia 24605; United States; 37°14′12.11″N 81°16′11.98″W

Information
- School type: Public, high school
- Founded: 1914
- School district: Tazewell County Public Schools
- NCES District ID: 5103810
- Superintendent: Christopher Stacy
- NCES School ID: 510381001653
- Principal: Joanne Young
- Teaching staff: 41.25 (on an FTE basis)
- Grades: 9–12
- Enrollment: 489 (2024–25)
- Student to teacher ratio: 11.85
- Language: English
- Colors: Cardinal and Gold for Athletics; Maroon and Grey for Academics
- Athletics conference: VHSL 2A Southwest District; VHSL 2A Region D
- Nickname: G-Men And G-Girls
- Rival: Richlands High School; Bluefield High School
- Feeder schools: Graham Middle School
- Website: Official Site

Graham High School is a public high school located in Bluefield, Virginia across the state line from Bluefield, West Virginia in Tazewell County, Virginia, as a part of Tazewell County Public Schools.

== History ==
Graham High School was first established as a secondary school in 1914, serving grades 9–12 in what was then known as the town of Graham, Virginia (now Bluefield). The cornerstone for building located on Greever Avenue, also known as, "The Hill", was laid on May 26, 1914. J.O. Faulkner was the first principal, and there were 107 students enrolled in the high school. (A total of 611 students, in primary, grammar, and high school grades, attended school in the building which could accommodate 750).

Graham High School grew its facilities at the end of 2010 when they opened up a new weight lifting facility and football locker room. They also unveiled a new gymnasium that serves as a practice gym for the men's and women's basketball teams and is the location where the Bluefield, VA recreational basketball league hosts many of its games. The gym has 2 full size courts along with men's and women's locker rooms.

In 2016, the Tazewell County School Board promoted Cynthia Beavers, former assistant principal, to be the first female principal ever to have a tenure at Graham High School.

The classic Graham/Beaver football game is the biggest event each year for the two Bluefields. This game between cross-city rivals Graham High School and Bluefield High School is the area's largest sporting event. It is held at Mitchell Stadium, which is within West Virginia by a mere 500 feet, and is shared by both schools. In 1991, the two schools were featured on the ESPN show Scholastic Sports America for having one of the largest high school football rivalries on the East Coast. With average crowds of at least ten thousand, the game is the talk of the town year after year. The Beavers hold a winning record over Graham in the series, 62-25-2. Graham High School's football team won the Virginia High School League's Class 2 State Football Championship in 2024. The G-Men defeated Strasburg High School 31-8 on December 14 at Salem City Stadium for the state crown. Previous state football titles were won in 1962, 1989, 1995, 2018 and 2022.

== Alma mater ==
The Graham High School alma mater is the tune to "Far Above Cayuga's Waters."

Nestled near East River's ridges, with its lines of blue
Stands our noble alma mater, glorious to view.
G-Men faithful, G-Girls grateful,
Conquer and prevail.
Hail to thee our Alma Mater.
Graham High, all hail!

== Fight song ==
Illinois Loyalty

== Extracurricular activities ==
Graham High School offers a variety of clubs and activities. Among these clubs are: Student Council Association, Interact Club, Pep Club, Future Business Leaders of America, Students Against Destructive Decisions, Beta, Cadre, Book Club, DECA, Values Club, and Forever Golden.

== Marching band ==
The Graham High School Big G Marching Band has won many awards including overall best band at the AT&T Cotton Bowl Classic and 15 time Virginia Honor Band titles. The Band has also participated in 3 of Macy's Thanksgiving Day Parade in New York City and the Inaugural Parades of multiple Virginia Governors. The current director of the band is Dr. Carl Hess, a James Madison University and Graham High School alumni.

== Athletic Team State Championships ==
- Football: 1962, 1989, 1995, 2018, 2022, 2024
- Boys Basketball: 1956, 2026
- Girls Basketball: 1922
- Competition Cheer: 2016, 2023, 2024
- Girls Tennis: 1999
- Golf: 2013, 2025, 2026

== Notable alumni ==
- Cam Allen: 2016-2019, attended Purdue University and declared for the 2024 NFL draft.
- Ahmad Bradshaw: 2000–2004, attended Marshall University and was drafted with the 250th pick in the 7th round of the 2007 NFL draft by the New York Giants. Two time Super Bowl Champion.
- Bill Dudley: 1935–1939, attended the University of Virginia, awarded the Maxwell Award, and was drafted with the 1st pick of the 1942 NFL Draft by the Pittsburgh Steelers. Member of the Pro Football Hall of Fame.
